= 2026 Kursk Oblast legislative election =

Regional legislative election in Russia

- 18–20 September 2026

All 45 seats in the Oblast Duma 23 seats needed for a majority
- Turnout: 54.41% ▲7.95 pp
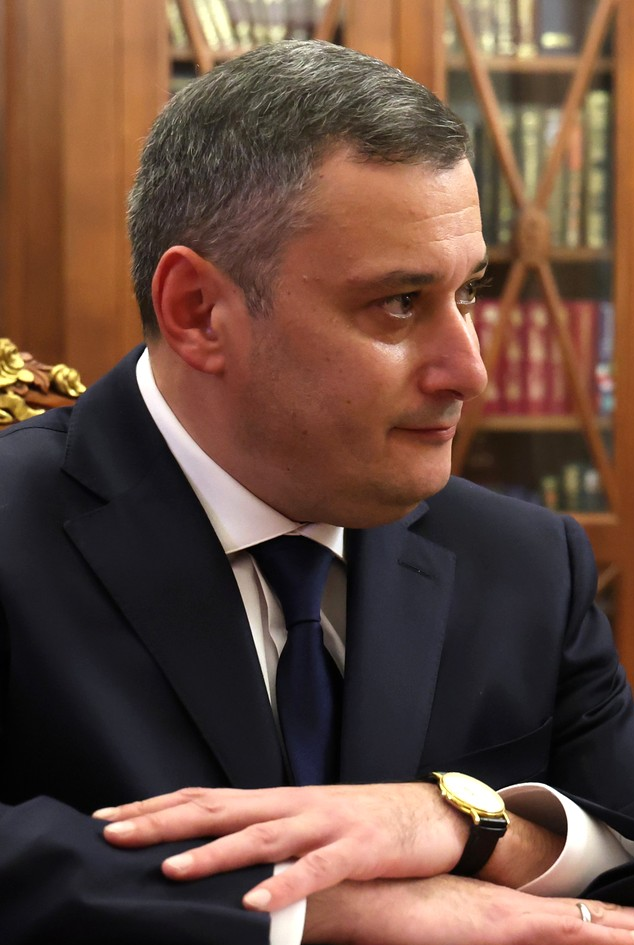

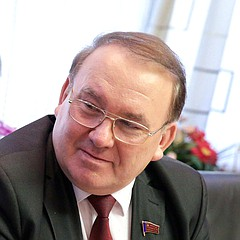

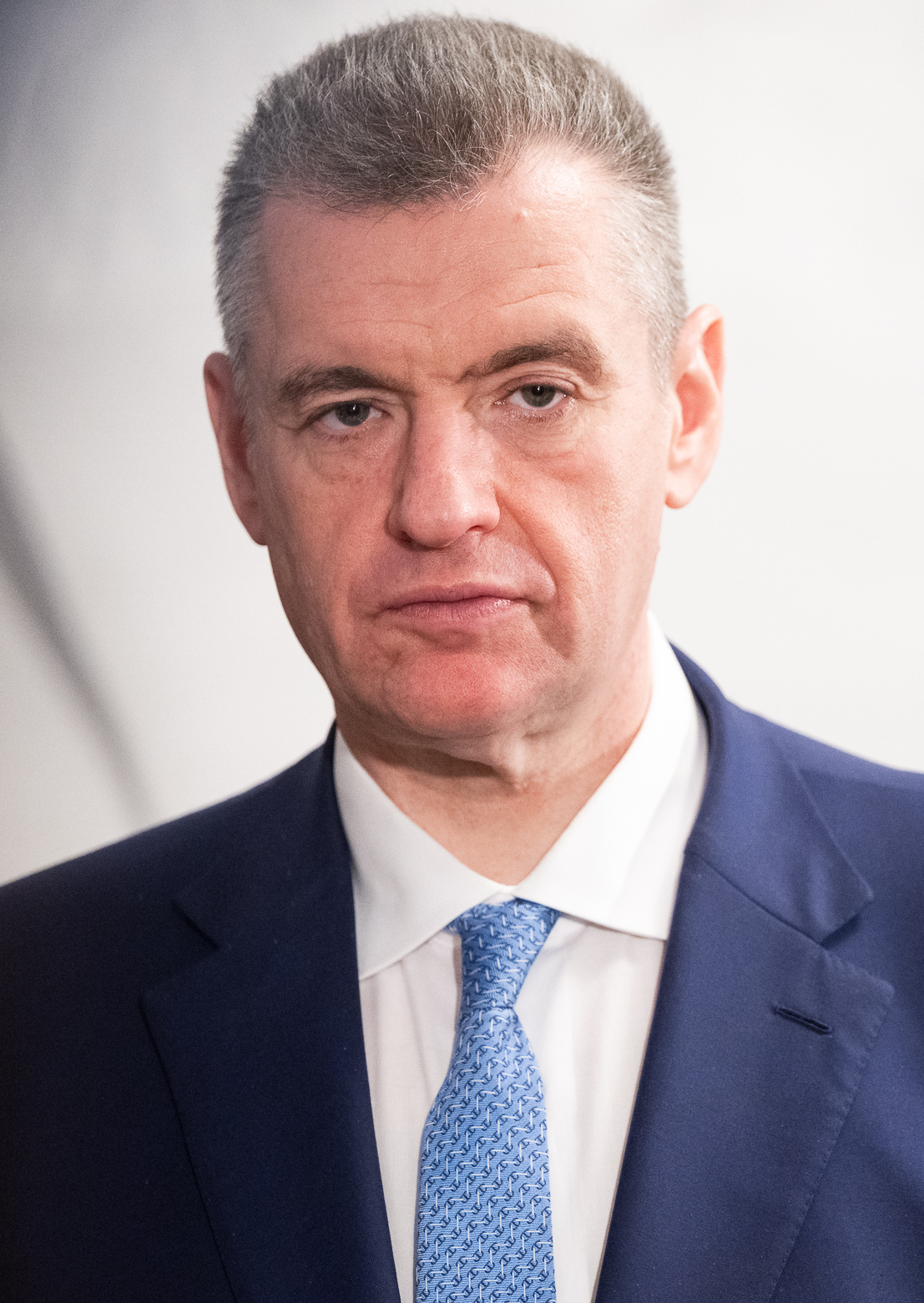

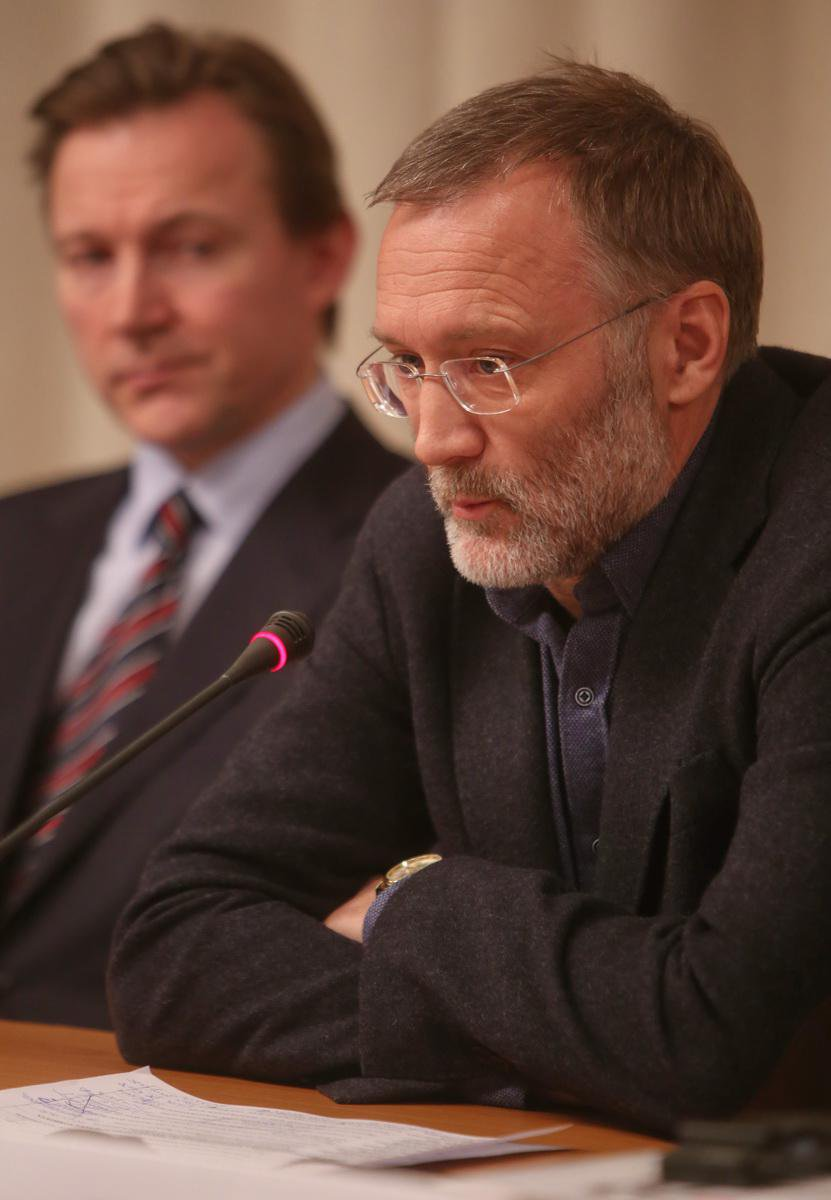
	Majority party	Minority party	Third party
Candidate	Alexander Khinshtein	Nikolay Ivanov	Leonid Slutsky
Party	United Russia	CPRF	LDPR
Last election	42.97%, 31 seats	20.71%, 7 seats	11.71%, 2 seats
Seats won	37	3	2
Seat change	▲6	▼4	Steady
Popular vote	258,615	64,310	47,678
Percentage	55.83%	13.88%	10.29%
Swing	▲12.86 pp	▼6.83 pp	▼1.42 pp
	Fourth party	Fifth party	Sixth party
	NL		RPPSS
Candidate	Maksim Sysoyev	Sergey Mikheyev	Irina Antsiferova
Party	New People	A Just Russia	Party of Pensioners
Last election	7.18%, 1 seat	9.24%, 2 seats	5.49%, 1 seat
Seats won	2	1	0
Seat change	▲1	▼1	▼1
Popular vote	39,438	24,117	17,080
Percentage	8.51%	5.21%	3.69%
Swing	▲1.33 pp	▼4.03 pp	▼1.80 pp
Chairman before election
Nikolay Zherebilov
United Russia
Elected Chairman
Nikolay Zherebilov
United Russia
Senator before election
Alexander Bryksin
Independent (Note: elected on the United Russia party list)
Senator after election
Alexander Bryksin
Independent

The 2026 Kursk Oblast Duma election took place on 18–20 September 2026, on common election day, coinciding with the 2026 Russian legislative election. All 45 seats in the Oblast Duma were up for re-election.

United Russia increased its overwhelming majority in the Oblast Duma, winning 55.8% of the vote and all 24 single-mandate constituencies. Communist Party of the Russian Federation finished second but lost more than half of its faction retaining three deputies. New People increased its vote share, gaining a second seat. A Just Russia barely crossed a 5% threshold, holding a single seat, while Russian Party of Pensioners for Social Justice lost its faction in the Oblast Duma.

== Electoral system ==
Under current election laws, the Oblast Duma is elected for a term of five years, with parallel voting. 21 seats are elected by party-list proportional representation with a 5% electoral threshold (down from 22 seats in 2021), with the other part elected in 24 single-member constituencies by first-past-the-post voting (up from 23 seats in 2021). Seats in the proportional part are allocated using the Imperiali quota, modified to ensure that every party list, which passes the threshold, receives at least one mandate.

== Candidates ==
=== Party lists ===
To register regional lists of candidates, parties need to collect 0.5% of signatures of all registered voters in Kursk Oblast.

The following parties were relieved from the necessity to collect signatures:

- United Russia
- Communist Party of the Russian Federation
- Liberal Democratic Party of Russia
- A Just Russia
- New People
- Russian Party of Pensioners for Social Justice

№	Party	Oblast-wide list	Candidates	Territorial groups	Status
1	United Russia	Alexander Khinshtein • Nikolay Volobuyev • Alexander Bryksin	74	24	Registered
2	Liberal Democratic Party	Leonid Slutsky • Aleksey Tomanov	73	24	Registered
3	A Just Russia	Sergey Mikheyev • Gennady Bayev • Vladimir Sinelnikov	54	23	Registered
4	New People	Maksim Sysoyev • Dmitry Ryzhkov • Roman Novikov	75	24	Registered
5	Communist Party	Nikolay Ivanov • Aleksandr Anpilov • Yury Roshchin	69	24	Registered
6	Party of Pensioners	Irina Antsiferova • Sergey Gridin • Irina Aleksapolskaya	31	14	Registered

=== Single-mandate constituencies ===
24 single-mandate constituencies were formed in Kursk Oblast, one additional constituency was created in Kursk in 2025. To register candidates in single-mandate constituencies need to collect 3% of signatures of registered voters in the constituency.

Number of candidates in single-mandate constituencies
Party	Candidates	
Party	Nominated	Registered
United Russia	24	24
Communist Party	24	23
Liberal Democratic Party	24	21
A Just Russia	23	23
New People	22	22
Party of Pensioners	1	1
Independent	2	0
Total	120	114

== Results ==
=== Results by party lists ===
Summary of the 18–20 September 2026 Kursk Oblast Duma election results
Party	Party list					Constituency		Total	
Party	Votes	%	±pp	Seats	+/–	Seats	+/–	Seats	+/–
United Russia	258,615	55.83	▲12.86	13	▲2	24	▲4	37	▲6
Communist Party	64,310	13.88	▼6.83	3	▼2	0	▼2	3	▼4
Liberal Democratic Party	47,678	10.29	▼1.42	2	Steady	0	Steady	2	Steady
New People	39,438	8.51	▲1.33	2	▲1	0	Steady	2	▲1
A Just Russia	24,117	5.21	▼4.03	1	▼1	0	Steady	1	▼1
Party of Pensioners	17,080	3.69	▼1.80	0	▼1	0	New	0	▼1
Invalid ballots	11,971	2.58	▼0.12	—	—	—	—	—	—
Total	463,209	100.00	—	21	▼1	24	▲1	45	Steady
Turnout	463,209	54.41	▲7.95	—	—	—	—	—	—
Registered voters	851,291	100.00	—	—	—	—	—	—	—

Nikolay Zherebilov (United Russia) was re-elected Chairman of the Oblast Duma, while incumbent Senator Alexander Bryksin (Independent) was re-appointed to the Federation Council.

=== Results in single-member constituencies ===
==== District 1 ====
Summary of the 18–20 September 2026 Kursk Oblast Duma election in District 1
Candidate	Party	Votes	%
Irina Malakhova	United Russia	13,655	58.56%
Aleksey Bobovnikov	Communist Party	3,970	17.03%
Yury Selikhov	A Just Russia	1,818	7.80%
Yekaterina Tomanova	Liberal Democratic Party	1,763	7.56%
Pavel Rozberg	New People	1,539	6.60%
Total		23,316	100%

==== District 2 ====
Summary of the 18–20 September 2026 Kursk Oblast Duma election in District 2
Candidate	Party	Votes	%
Aleksey Kolesnikov	United Russia	12,099	52.90%
Natalya Koltunova	New People	3,532	15.44%
Vladimir Kochnev	Communist Party	2,563	11.21%
Ivan Dobrovolsky	Liberal Democratic Party	2,458	10.75%
Nikolay Ishkov	A Just Russia	1,529	6.68%
Total		22,873	100%

==== District 3 ====
Summary of the 18–20 September 2026 Kursk Oblast Duma election in District 3
Candidate	Party	Votes	%
Vyacheslav Khloponin (incumbent)	United Russia	7,247	41.27%
Aleksandr Yegupov	Communist Party	3,068	17.47%
Aleksandr Yevdokimov	A Just Russia	2,463	14.03%
Natalya Tsiryulnikova	Liberal Democratic Party	2,089	11.90%
Leon Zambakhidze	New People	1,849	10.53%
Total		17,558	100%

==== District 4 ====
Summary of the 18–20 September 2026 Kursk Oblast Duma election in District 4
Candidate	Party	Votes	%
Aleksandr Panyukov	United Russia	8,596	47.92%
Roman Deriglazov	Communist Party	3,212	17.91%
Vladimir Besedin	Liberal Democratic Party	2,706	15.08%
Anton Khodyrevsky	A Just Russia	2,528	14.09%
Total		17,939	100%

==== District 5 ====
Summary of the 18–20 September 2026 Kursk Oblast Duma election in District 5
Candidate	Party	Votes	%
Dmitry Yevdokimov	United Russia	9,097	46.57%
Aleksey Klyuyev (incumbent)	Communist Party	3,377	17.29%
Vladimir Sechin	New People	2,723	13.94%
Gennady Gorbulin	Liberal Democratic Party	2,213	11.33%
Kapitolina Davidova	A Just Russia	1,475	7.55%
Total		19,535	100%

==== District 6 ====
Summary of the 18–20 September 2026 Kursk Oblast Duma election in District 6
Candidate	Party	Votes	%
Andrey Yelnikov	United Russia	9,246	46.87%
Diana Popova	New People	2,908	14.74%
Pave Torgonin	Communist Party	2,754	13.96%
Anna Lvova	A Just Russia	2,060	10.44%
Yaroslav Shumakov	Liberal Democratic Party	1,922	9.74%
Total		19,727	100%

==== District 7 ====
Summary of the 18–20 September 2026 Kursk Oblast Duma election in District 7
Candidate	Party	Votes	%
Dmitry Guliyev (incumbent)	United Russia	13,523	62.79%
Sergey Suvorov	Communist Party	2,413	11.20%
Daniil Chekulayev	Liberal Democratic Party	1,964	9.12%
Yegor Obozny	New People	1,807	8.39%
Sofya Molokoyedova	A Just Russia	1,219	5.66%
Total		21,538	100%

==== District 8 ====
Summary of the 18–20 September 2026 Kursk Oblast Duma election in District 8
Candidate	Party	Votes	%
Andrey Dyudin (incumbent)	United Russia	9,170	48.19%
Maksim Nemirovsky	Communist Party	2,957	15.54%
Vladislav Tsukanov	New People	2,321	12.20%
Mikhail Drozdov	Liberal Democratic Party	2,040	10.72%
Vasily Verevkin	A Just Russia	1,807	9.50%
Total		19,028	100%

==== District 9 ====
Summary of the 18–20 September 2026 Kursk Oblast Duma election in District 9
Candidate	Party	Votes	%
Igor Deriglazov (incumbent)	United Russia	8,775	47.94%
Pavel Dubonos	Communist Party	2,782	15.20%
Ilya Alpatov	New People	2,213	12.09%
Pavel Bugorsky	A Just Russia	2,204	12.04%
Maria Kazakova	Liberal Democratic Party	1,714	9.36%
Total		18,305	100%

==== District 10 ====
Summary of the 18–20 September 2026 Kursk Oblast Duma election in District 10
Candidate	Party	Votes	%
Aleksey Zemtsov (incumbent)	United Russia	11,191	48.54%
Maksim Volobuyev	Communist Party	3,945	17.11%
Viktor Zakharov	Liberal Democratic Party	2,616	11.35%
Alina Khudobina	New People	2,445	10.60%
Dmitry Petrushin	A Just Russia	2,189	9.49%
Total		23,057	100%

==== District 11 ====
Summary of the 18–20 September 2026 Kursk Oblast Duma election in District 11
Candidate	Party	Votes	%
Aleksandr Trubnikov (incumbent)	United Russia	8,485	45.21%
Igor Bredikhin	Communist Party	4,460	23.76%
Dmitry Kushkhov	New People	2,342	12.48%
Vadim Pinchuk	Liberal Democratic Party	1,655	8.82%
Vladimir Sevulyak	A Just Russia	914	4.87%
Total		18,769	100%

==== District 12 ====
Summary of the 18–20 September 2026 Kursk Oblast Duma election in District 12
Candidate	Party	Votes	%
Aleksandr Musyal	United Russia	9,351	42.14%
Oksana Boyko	Communist Party	4,509	20.32%
Maksim Sysoyev	New People	3,996	18.01%
Oleg Breyev	Liberal Democratic Party	3,563	16.06%
Total		22,189	100%

==== District 13 ====
Summary of the 18–20 September 2026 Kursk Oblast Duma election in District 13
Candidate	Party	Votes	%
Sergey Bocharov	United Russia	13,460	66.80%
Sergey Pyanykh	Communist Party	2,783	13.81%
Irina Anisimova	New People	1,759	8.73%
Denis Livandovsky	Liberal Democratic Party	949	4.71%
Nikolay Parkhomenko	A Just Russia	643	3.19%
Total		20,149	100%

==== District 14 ====
Summary of the 18–20 September 2026 Kursk Oblast Duma election in District 14
Candidate	Party	Votes	%
Aleksey Kapustin	United Russia	15,775	69.27%
Sergey Ukolov	Communist Party	3,146	13.82%
Ruslan Klevtsov	New People	1,888	8.29%
Galina Karaulova	A Just Russia	1,412	6.20%
Total		22,772	100%

==== District 15 ====
Summary of the 18–20 September 2026 Kursk Oblast Duma election in District 15
Candidate	Party	Votes	%
Nikolay Zherebilov (incumbent)	United Russia	12,960	53.92%
Aleksandr Nikiforov	Communist Party	3,316	13.80%
Vasily Yesenkov	New People	2,943	12.24%
Aleksandr Bobyrev	Liberal Democratic Party	2,508	10.43%
Olga Shchukina	A Just Russia	1,652	6.87%
Total		24,035	100%

==== District 16 ====
Summary of the 18–20 September 2026 Kursk Oblast Duma election in District 16
Candidate	Party	Votes	%
Andrey Osharin	United Russia	6,804	44.71%
Sofia Galimova	Communist Party	3,958	26.01%
Ilya Azarov	New People	2,064	13.56%
Igor Nikolayenko	Party of Pensioners	1,060	6.97%
Artyom Vyskrebentsev	A Just Russia	625	4.11%
Total		15,217	100%

==== District 17 ====
Summary of the 18–20 September 2026 Kursk Oblast Duma election in District 17
Candidate	Party	Votes	%
Vladimir Agafonov (incumbent)	United Russia	12,040	57.95%
Sergey Samarin	Communist Party	2,673	12.87%
Dmitry Ryzhkov	New People	2,262	10.89%
Aleksandr Freydin	Liberal Democratic Party	1,922	9.25%
Anton Samofalov	A Just Russia	1,146	5.52%
Total		20,777	100%

==== District 18 ====
Summary of the 18–20 September 2026 Kursk Oblast Duma election in District 18
Candidate	Party	Votes	%
Nikolay Volobuyev	United Russia	4,705	60.74%
Irina Sedykh	New People	1,041	13.44%
Aleksey Kurlenko	A Just Russia	995	12.85%
Parviz Suleimanov	Communist Party	778	10.04%
Total		7,746	100%

==== District 19 ====
Summary of the 18–20 September 2026 Kursk Oblast Duma election in District 19
Candidate	Party	Votes	%
Ivan Dolgopolov	United Russia	2,885	44.45%
Anastasia Mitrofanova-Blinkina	A Just Russia	1,089	16.78%
Konstantin Timofeyev	Liberal Democratic Party	940	14.48%
Sergey Bogdanov	Communist Party	827	12.74%
Roman Novikov	New People	571	8.80%
Total		6,490	100%

==== District 20 ====
Summary of the 18–20 September 2026 Kursk Oblast Duma election in District 20
Candidate	Party	Votes	%
Sergey Nosov	United Russia	6,271	59.19%
Sergey Dedkov	Liberal Democratic Party	1,786	16.86%
Aleksandr Kravtsov	New People	1,251	11.81%
Vladimir Babkin	A Just Russia	922	8.70%
Total		10,595	100%

==== District 21 ====
Summary of the 18–20 September 2026 Kursk Oblast Duma election in District 21
Candidate	Party	Votes	%
Yekaterina Kharchenko	United Russia	9,645	54.71%
Anton Timofeyev	Communist Party	2,300	13.05%
Dmitry Gorodensky	New People	1,907	10.82%
Andrey Korovin	Liberal Democratic Party	1,821	10.33%
Aleksandr Zhudinov	A Just Russia	1,311	7.44%
Total		17,630	100%

==== District 22 ====
Summary of the 18–20 September 2026 Kursk Oblast Duma election in District 22
Candidate	Party	Votes	%
Boris Sorokin (incumbent)	United Russia	7,771	39.58%
Polina Solodukhina	Communist Party	3,640	18.54%
Yelena Bogovkova	Liberal Democratic Party	2,623	13.36%
Andrey Polyakov	New People	2,621	13.35%
Mikhail Smolin	A Just Russia	2,019	10.28%
Total		19,633	100%

==== District 23 ====
Summary of the 18–20 September 2026 Kursk Oblast Duma election in District 23
Candidate	Party	Votes	%
Vladimir Stefanovich	United Russia	7,222	38.58%
Aleksandr Ponarin	Communist Party	4,055	21.66%
Nikita Lukyanchikov	Liberal Democratic Party	3,257	17.40%
Dmitry Tolmachev	A Just Russia	3,118	16.66%
Total		18,720	100%

==== District 24 ====
Summary of the 18–20 September 2026 Kursk Oblast Duma election in District 24
Candidate	Party	Votes	%
Eduard Dyumin (incumbent)	United Russia	16,806	61.04%
Yevgeny Dyumin	Liberal Democratic Party	3,625	13.17%
Mikhail Achkasov	Communist Party	3,036	11.03%
Sergey Kapustin	New People	1,687	6.13%
Galina Khasanova	A Just Russia	1,407	5.11%
Total		27,535	100%

=== Members ===
Incumbent deputies are highlighted with bold, elected members who declined to take a seat are marked with ~~strikethrough~~.

Constituency
No.	Member	Party
1	Irina Malakhova	United Russia
2	Aleksey Kolesnikov	United Russia
3	Vyacheslav Khloponin	United Russia
4	Aleksandr Panyukov	United Russia
5	Dmitry Yevdokimov	United Russia
6	Andrey Yelnikov	United Russia
7	Dmitry Guliyev	United Russia
8	Andrey Dyudin	United Russia
9	Igor Deriglazov	United Russia
10	Aleksey Zemtsov	United Russia
11	Aleksandr Trubnikov	United Russia
12	Aleksandr Musyal	United Russia
13	Sergey Bocharov	United Russia
14	Aleksey Kapustin	United Russia
15	Nikolay Zherebilov	United Russia
16	Andrey Osharin	United Russia
17	Vladimir Agafonov	United Russia
18	Nikolay Volobuyev	United Russia
19	Ivan Dolgopolov	United Russia
20	Sergey Nosov	United Russia
21	Yekaterina Kharchenko	United Russia
22	Boris Sorokin	United Russia
23	Vladimir Stefanovich	United Russia
24	Eduard Dyumin	United Russia

Party lists
Member	Party
~~Alexander Khinshtein~~	United Russia
Alexander Bryksin	United Russia
Anatoly Zuy	United Russia
Konstantin Komkov	United Russia
~~Yevgeny Lobov~~	United Russia
Pyotr Chepurin	United Russia
Aleksandr Lobzov	United Russia
Andrey Milyutin	United Russia
Aleksandr Kichigin	United Russia
~~Yelena Besedina~~	United Russia
Anton Boldin	United Russia
Aleksandr Khudin	United Russia
Oleg Khilko	United Russia
Yelena Tsukanova	United Russia
~~Maksim Tyurikov~~	United Russia
Grigol Rukhadze	United Russia
~~Anna Yelagina~~	United Russia
Igor Zorya	United Russia
~~Nikolay Ivanov~~	Communist Party
Aleksandr Anpilov	Communist Party
Yury Roshchin	Communist Party
Vasily Yakunin	Communist Party
~~Leonid Slutsky~~	Liberal Democratic Party
Aleksey Tomanov	Liberal Democratic Party
Oleg Breyev	Liberal Democratic Party
Maksim Sysoyev	New People
Dmitry Ryzhkov	New People
~~Sergey Mikheyev~~	A Just Russia
Gennady Bayev	A Just Russia

== See also ==
- 2026 Russian regional elections
