= Kursk constituency =

Constituency of the State Duma of the Russian Federation

Kursk single-member constituency
- Constituency of the Russian State Duma
- Deputy: Vasily Piskaryov; United Russia
- Federal subject: Kursk Oblast
- Districts: Dmitriyevsky, Fatezhsky, Khomutovsky, Konyshyovsky, Kurchatov, Kurchatovsky, Kursk (Tsentralny), Kursky (Besedinsky, Brezhnevsky, Kamyshinsky, Mokovsky, Nizhnemedveditsky, Nozdrachevsky, Pashkovsky, Polyansky, Shchetinsky, Vinnikovsky), Lgov, Lgovsky, Ponyrovsky, Zheleznogorsk, Zheleznogorsky, Zolotukhinsky
- Voters: 427,285 (2026)

The Kursk constituency (No.110 (Note: No.98 in 1993-1995, No.96 in 1995-2003, No.97 in 2003-2007, No.109 in 2016–2026)) is a Russian legislative constituency in Kursk Oblast. The constituency covers part of Kursk and north-western Kursk Oblast.

The constituency has been represented since 2026 by United Russia deputy Vasily Piskaryov, three-term State Duma member and justice colonel general, who won the open seat left vacant following the resignation of one-term United Russia deputy Yekaterina Kharchenko in June 2026. Piskaryov has chaired the Duma Committee on Security and Corruption since October 2016.

== Boundaries ==
1993–2007: Cheremisinovsky District, Gorshechensky District, Kastorensky District, Kursk, Kursky District, Manturovsky District, Shchigrovsky District, Shchigry, Solntsevsky District, Sovetsky District, Timsky District
The constituency covered eastern Kursk Oblast as well as oblast capital Kursk and the city of Shchigry.

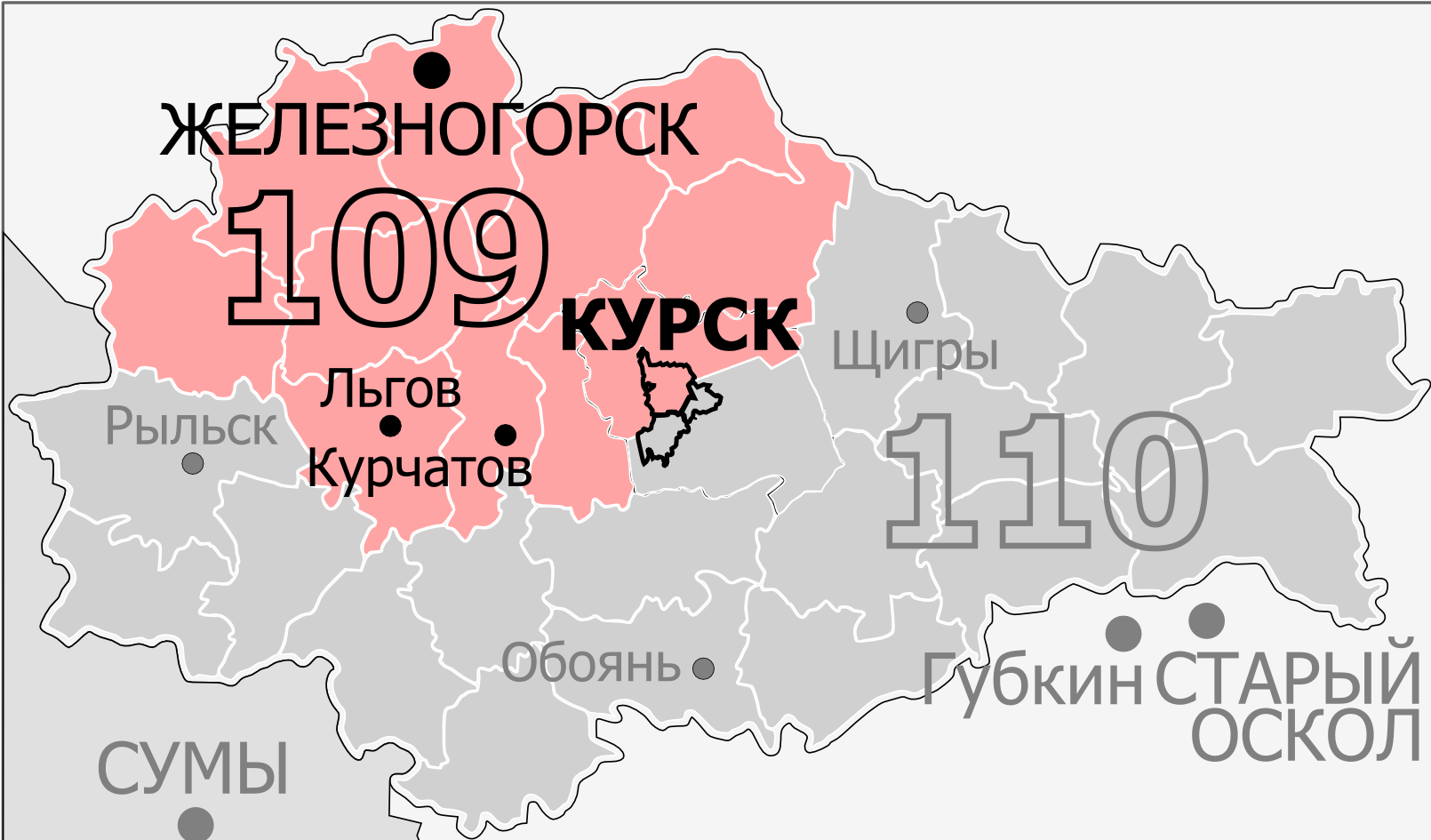
Constituency boundaries from 2016 to 2026

2016–2026: Dmitriyevsky District, Fatezhsky District, Khomutovsky District, Konyshyovsky District, Kurchatov, Kurchatovsky District, Kursk (Tsentralny), Kursky District (Brezhnevsky, Kamyshinsky, Mokovsky, Nizhnemedveditsky, Nozdrachevsky, Pashkovsky, Polyansky, Schchetinsky, Vinnikovsky), Lgov, Lgovsky District, Oktyabrsky District, Ponyrovsky District, Zheleznogorsk, Zheleznogorsky District, Zolotukhinsky District
The constituency was re-created for the 2016 election and retained only Tsentralny city district of Kursk and its north-western and northern suburbs, losing the rest of its former territory to new Seimsky constituency. This seat instead gained north-western Kursk Oblast from the former Lgov constituency.

2026–present: Dmitriyevsky District, Fatezhsky District, Khomutovsky District, Konyshyovsky District, Kurchatov, Kurchatovsky District, Kursk (Tsentralny), Kursky District (Besedinsky, Brezhnevsky, Kamyshinsky, Mokovsky, Nizhnemedveditsky, Nozdrachevsky, Pashkovsky, Polyansky, Shchetinsky, Vinnikovsky), Lgov, Lgovsky District, Ponyrovsky District, Zheleznogorsk, Zheleznogorsky District, Zolotukhinsky District
After 2025 redistricting the constituency saw minor changes, swapping Oktyabrsky District for Kursk eastern suburbs with Seimsky constituency.

== Members elected ==
Election	Member	Party
1993	Aleksandr Mikhaylov	Communist Party
1995	Aleksandr Mikhaylov	Communist Party
1999	Nikolay Ivanov	Communist Party
2003	Aleksandr Chukhrayov	United Russia
2007	Proportional representation - no election by constituency	
2011	Proportional representation - no election by constituency	
2016	Tatyana Voronina	United Russia
2021	Yekaterina Kharchenko (Note: appointed acting rector of Kursk State University in June 2026)	United Russia
2026	Vasily Piskaryov	United Russia

== Election results ==
=== 1993 ===
Summary of the 12 December 1993 Russian legislative election in the Kursk constituency
Candidate	Party	Votes	%
Aleksandr Mikhaylov	Communist Party	50,577	19.50%
Gennady Merkulov	Independent	–	11.00%
Aleksandr Anpilov	Independent	–	–
Vsevolod Astafyev	Independent	–	–
Aleksandr Grachev	Russian Democratic Reform Movement	–	–
Sergey Loktionov	Future of Russia–New Names	–	–
Nikolay Pridvorov	Independent	–	–
Anatoly Pronin	Independent	–	–
Sergey Pyanykh	Yavlinsky–Boldyrev–Lukin	–	–
Yury Razinkov	Civic Union	–	–
Yury Ruda	Liberal Democratic Party	–	–
Fyodor Ryzhkov	Independent	–	–
Total		259,403	100%

=== 1995 ===
Summary of the 17 December 1995 Russian legislative election in the Kursk constituency
Candidate	Party	Votes	%
Aleksandr Mikhaylov (incumbent)	Communist Party	121,431	34.53%
Sergey Loktionov	Derzhava	82,421	23.05%
Larisa Piyasheva	Independent	50,456	14.11%
Igor Chukhrayov	Agrarian Party	24,444	6.84%
Yury Ruda	Liberal Democratic Party	15,009	4.20%
Nikolay Kolesov	Independent	12,878	3.60%
Yulia Presnyakova	Trade Unions and Industrialists – Union of Labour	6,803	1.90%
against all		35,001	9.79%
Total		357,504	100%

=== 1999 ===
Summary of the 19 December 1999 Russian legislative election in the Kursk constituency
Candidate	Party	Votes	%
Nikolay Ivanov	Communist Party	96,600	30.56%
Aleksandr Fedulov	Unity	45,664	14.45%
Nikolay Greshilov	Independent	24,658	7.80%
Sergey Falaleyev	Independent	21,764	6.89%
Boris Surayev	Independent	21,055	6.66%
Galina Okorokova	Women of Russia	13,356	4.23%
Aleksandr Kozyavin	Independent	12,290	3.89%
Sergey Ivanov	Liberal Democratic Party	11,872	3.76%
Fyodor Ryzhkov	Our Home – Russia	10,425	3.30%
Sergey Loktionov	Independent	8,188	2.59%
Vladimir Ryzhikov	Spiritual Heritage	8,188	2.59%
Yury Donchenko	Independent	3,925	1.24%
Yury Shumilo	Independent	1,039	0.33%
Vladimir Shprygin	Independent	927	0.29%
against all		31,108	9.84%
Total		316,051	100%

=== 2003 ===
Summary of the 7 December 2003 Russian legislative election in the Kursk constituency
Candidate	Party	Votes	%
Aleksandr Chukhrayov	United Russia	66,820	26.18%
Nikolay Ivanov (incumbent)	Communist Party	52,703	20.65%
Aleksandr Fedulov	Great Russia–Eurasian Union	46,740	18.31%
Sergey Ivanov	Liberal Democratic Party	16,565	6.49%
Sergey Falaleyev	People's Party	7,703	3.02%
Anatoly Kryukov	Russian Pensioners' Party-Party of Social Justice	6,481	2.54%
Aleksandr Kapelyush	Yabloko	3,579	1.40%
Yelizaveta Dolgopolova	Independent	3,561	1.40%
Yury Safonov	Union of Right Forces	3,368	1.32%
Denis Yeshchenko	United Russian Party Rus'	1,842	0.72%
against all		37,123	14.54%
Total		255,390	100%

=== 2016 ===
Summary of the 18 September 2016 Russian legislative election in the Kursk constituency
Candidate	Party	Votes	%
Tatyana Voronina	United Russia	91,515	42.02%
Nikolay Ivanov	Communist Party	25,301	11.62%
Vladimir Fedorov	Liberal Democratic Party	24,836	11.40%
Olga Li	Yabloko	22,099	10.15%
Aleksandr Chetverikov	A Just Russia	17,347	7.96%
Artyom Vakarev	Communists of Russia	8,898	4.09%
Aleksey Volkov	Rodina	8,796	4.04%
Svetlana Sidorova	Patriots of Russia	6,561	3.01%
Denis Khmelevskoy	Party of Growth	2,194	1.01%
Alyona Kharlamova	Civilian Power	1,459	0.67%
Total		217,797	100%

=== 2021 ===
Summary of the 17-19 September 2021 Russian legislative election in the Kursk constituency
Candidate	Party	Votes	%
Yekaterina Kharchenko	United Russia	68,145	33.03%
Svetlana Kanunnikova	Communist Party	39,017	18.91%
Tatyana Bondarenko	New People	24,228	11.74%
Vladimir Fedorov	Liberal Democratic Party	21,439	10.39%
Irina Antsiferova	Party of Pensioners	19,462	9.43%
Pavel Lyulin	A Just Russia — For Truth	14,203	6.88%
Dmitry Tolmachev	Civic Platform	11,306	5.48%
Total		206,324	100%

=== 2026 ===
Summary of the 18-20 September 2026 Russian legislative election in the Kursk constituency
Candidate	Party	Votes	%
Vasily Piskaryov	United Russia	97,428	42.11%
Svetlana Kanunnikova	Communist Party	35,465	15.33%
Gennady Bayev	A Just Russia	24,458	10.57%
Dmitry Ryzhkov	New People	21,288	9.20%
Konstantin Timofeyev	Liberal Democratic Party	18,928	8.18%
Sergey Gridin	Party of Pensioners	14,715	6.36%
Aleksandr Gorbatenkov	The Greens	9,203	3.98%
Total		231,369	100%
