= Alexander Mikhailov (politician) =

Russian politician (1951–2020)

- Александр Михайлов
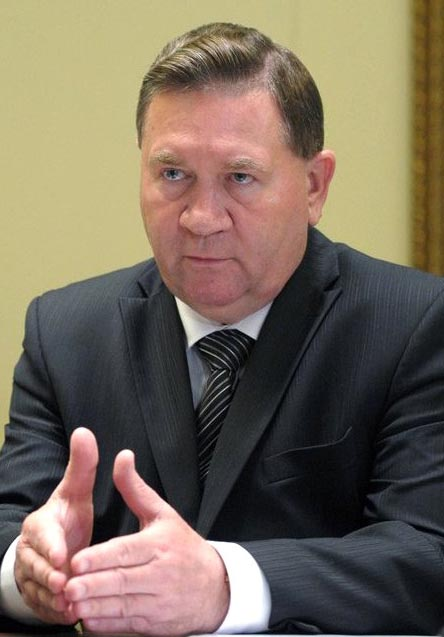
- Mikhailov in 2014

Russian Federation Senator from Kursk Oblast
- Representing the Executive
- In office 27 November 2018 – 4 December 2020
- Appointed by: Roman Starovoyt
- Preceded by: Vitaly Bogdanov
- Succeeded by: Grigory Rapota

3rd Governor of Kursk Oblast
- In office 18 November 2000 – 11 October 2018
- Preceded by: Alexander Rutskoy
- Succeeded by: Roman Starovoyt

Member of the State Duma (Party List Seat)
- In office 18 January 2000 – 15 November 2000
- Succeeded by: Vasily Altukhov

Member of the State Duma for Kursk Oblast
- In office 11 January 1994 – 18 January 2000
- Preceded by: constituency established
- Succeeded by: Nikolay Ivanov
- Constituency: Kursk (No. 98) (Note: renumbered to 96 in 1995.)

Personal details
- Born: 15 September 1951 Kosorzha, Shchigrovsky District, Kursk Oblast, Russian SFSR, Soviet Union
- Died: 4 December 2020 (aged 69) Kursk Oblast, Russia
- Party: United Russia (from 2004)
- Other political affiliations: CPSU (until 1991); SPT (1991–1993); CPRF (1993–2004)
- Children: 2
- Education: Sergei Kirov Kharkov Institute of Railway Transport Engineers; Rostov Higher Party School
- Occupation: Engineer; Politician

Aleksandr Nikolayevich Mikhailov (Russian: Александр Николаевич Михайлов; 15 September 1951 – 4 December 2020) was a Russian politician, who served as governor of Kursk Oblast, a member of the State Duma, and a senator on the Federation Council.

== Biography ==
Mikhailov was born in the village of Kosorzha in the Kursk Oblast on 15 September 1951. He studied mechanical engineering, graduating from Kharkov Institute of Railway Transport Engineers (now the Ukrainian State University of Railway Transport) in the year 1974. As a student, he was a member of the Komsomol. In 1985, he received a Candidate of Science— equivalent to a DPhil or PhD in the Anglosphere, in history from the Rostov Higher Party School.

From the late 1970s until the dissolution of the USSR, Mikhailov held various local offices in the Communist Party. After the ban on the Communist Party in 1991, he joined the Socialist Workers' Party, switching to newly reformed Communist Party of the Russian Federation at its inception in 1993. In 1993 he was elected to the 1st Convocation of the State Duma from the Kursk constituency of Kursk Oblast. He was re-elected from his constituency to the 2nd State Duma in 1995, and in 1999 he was elected as part of the CPRF party list.

Mikhailov resigned from the State Duma in November 2000 to become the Governor of his native Kursk Oblast, an office he held until resigning in 2018. In 2004, he switched to the ruling United Russia political party. A few months after resigning from his position as governor, Mikhailov was appointed a to represent Kursk Oblast in the Federation Council.

Mikhailov died on the way to the hospital after suffering a cardiac arrest at a political event in Kursk on 4 December 2020.

In 2010, Mikhailov became involved in a controversy over antisemitic remarks.
