= 8th State Duma =

Convocation of the lower house of Russian parliament

State Duma of the Federal Assembly of the Russian Federation of the 8th convocation
←	7th State Duma	9th State Duma	→
- Seat composition of the 8th State Duma

Overview
- Meeting place: State Duma building 1 Okhotny Ryad Street, Moscow
- Term: 12 October 2021 – 30 September 2026
- Election: 17–19 September 2021
- Website: State Duma
- Members: 436 / 450
- Chairman: Vyacheslav Volodin
- First Deputy Chairmen: Alexander Zhukov; Ivan Melnikov
- Deputy Chairmen: List: Anna Kuznetsova Irina Yarovaya Pyotr Tolstoy Alexey Gordeyev Sholban Kara-ool Viktoria Abramchenko Alexander Babakov Boris Chernyshov Vladislav Davankov
- Party control: Supermajority of United Russia (312)

The State Duma of the Federal Assembly of the Russian Federation of the 8th convocation (Russian: Государственная Дума Федерального Собрания Российской Федерации восьмого созыва) was the convocation of the lower house of Russian parliament that operated from 2021 to 2026.

The composition of the 8th State Duma was determined based on the results of the 2021 legislative election. Elections were held using a mixed system: 225 deputies were elected on party lists and 225 — in single-member constituencies. Of the 14 parties that participated in the elections, only 5 were able to overcome the 5% barrier. And for the first time since 1999, more than four parties were able to form their own factions. Three more parties and five independent candidates were able to win one seat each through single-mandate constituencies.

In accordance with the presidential decree, the first meeting of the 8th State Duma was held on 12 October 2021.

== Leadership ==
Chairman of the State Duma

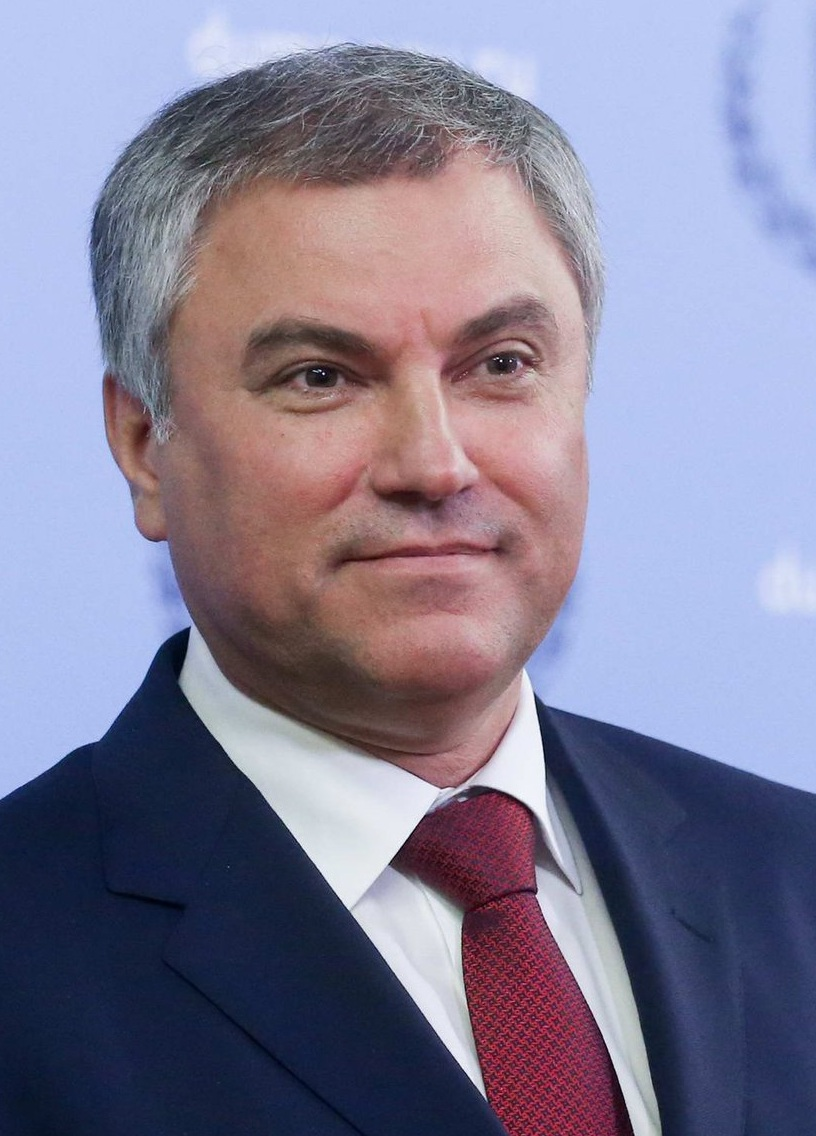
Vyacheslav Volodin (UR)

Faction leaders

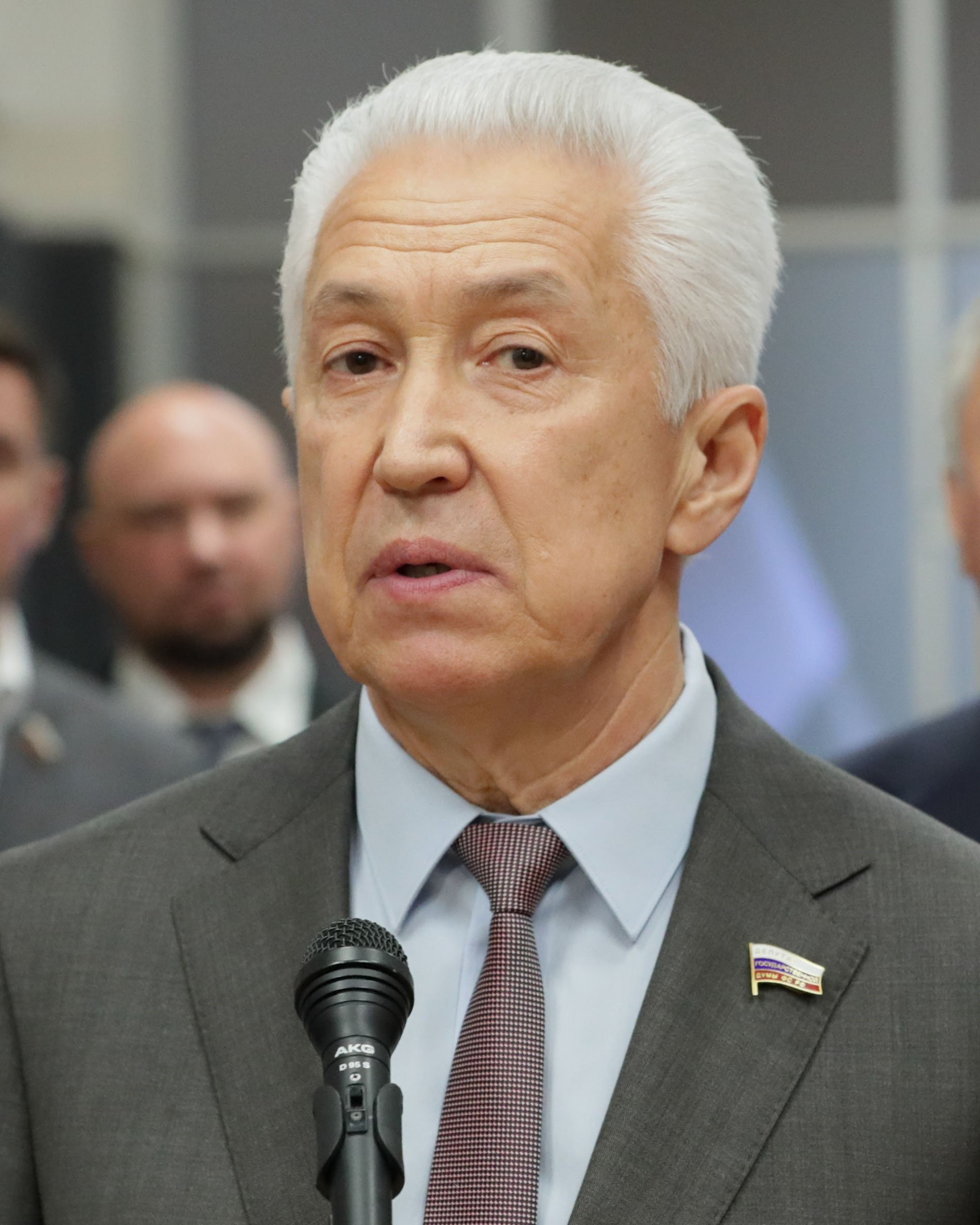
Vladimir Vasilyev
United Russia

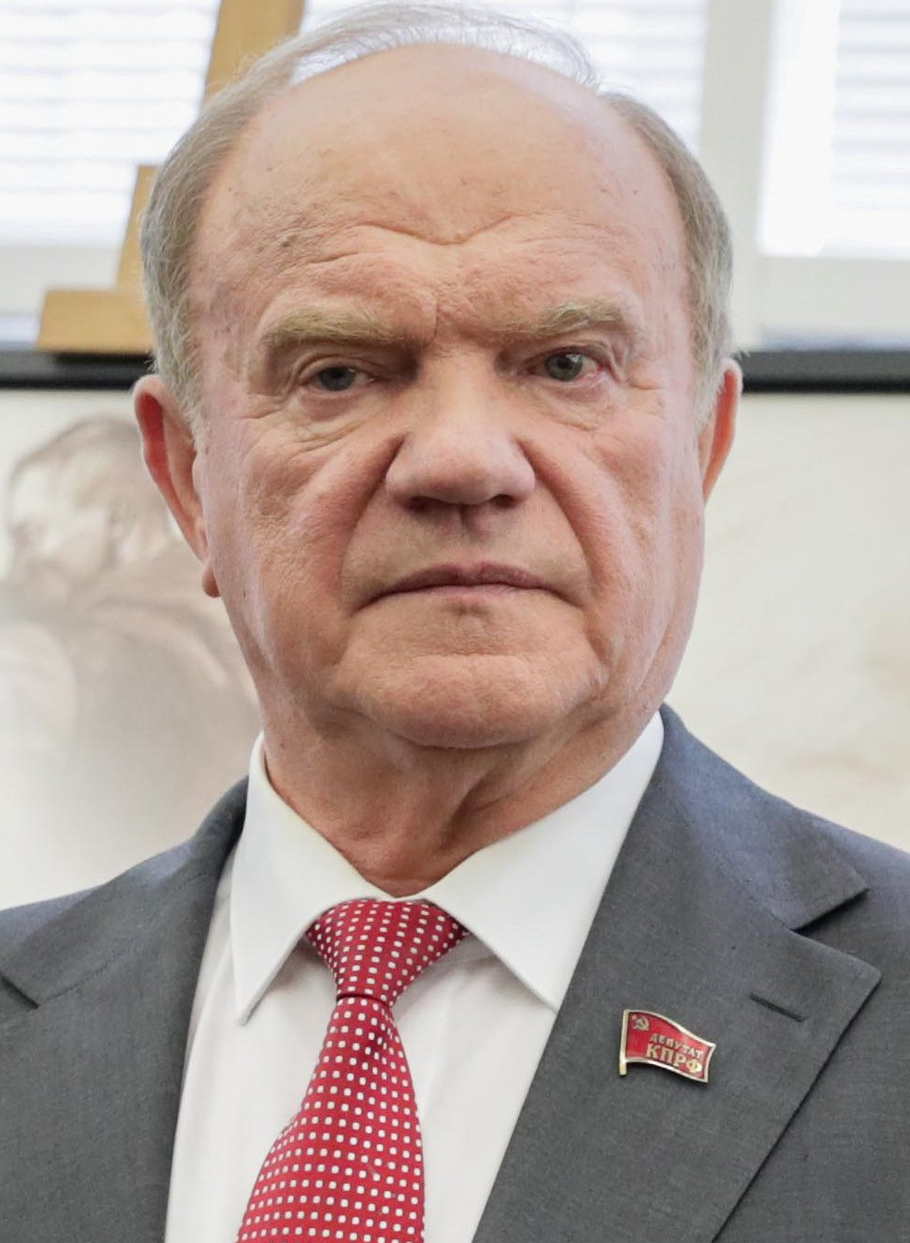
Gennady Zyuganov
Communist Party

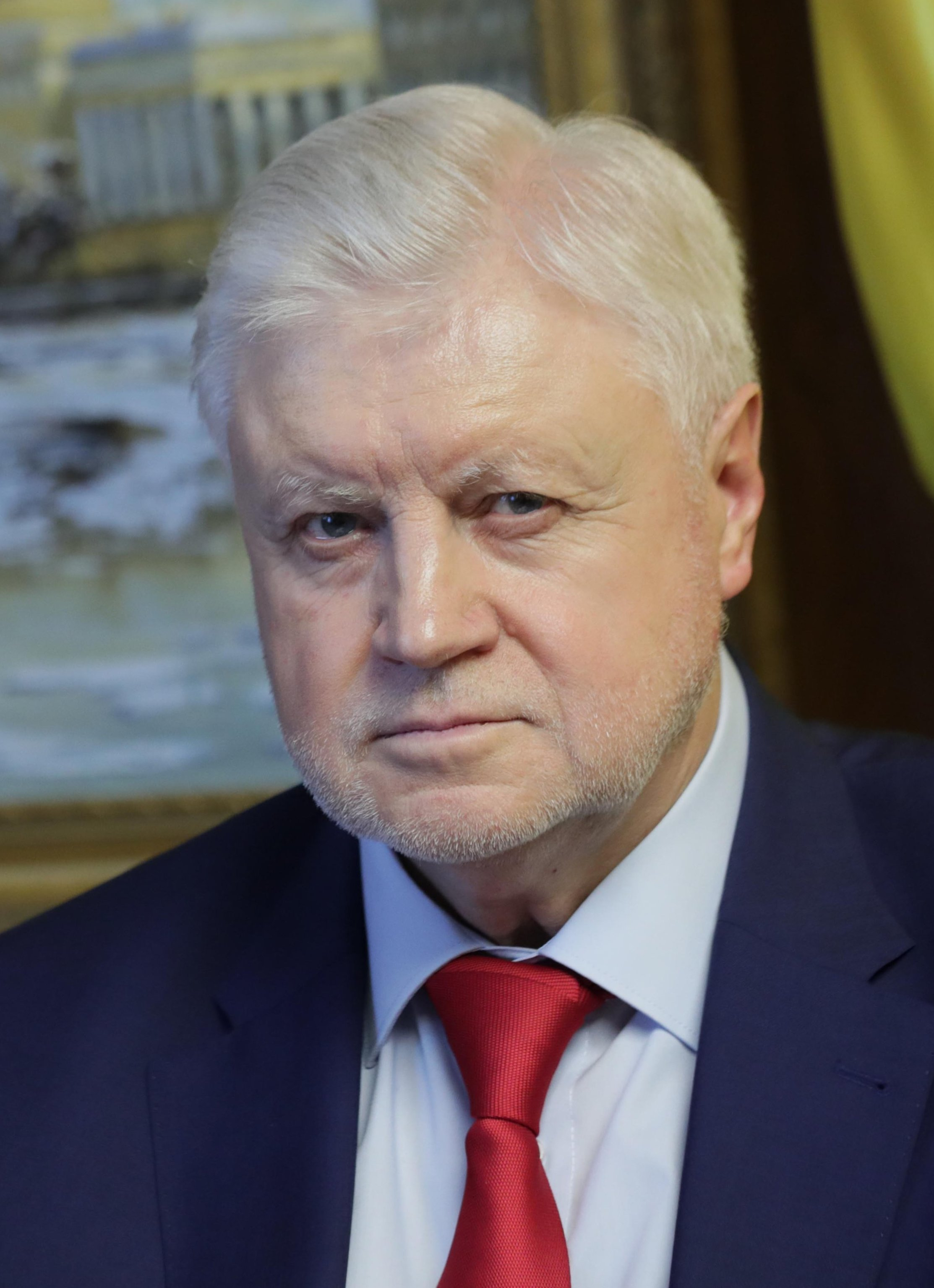
Sergey Mironov
A Just Russia

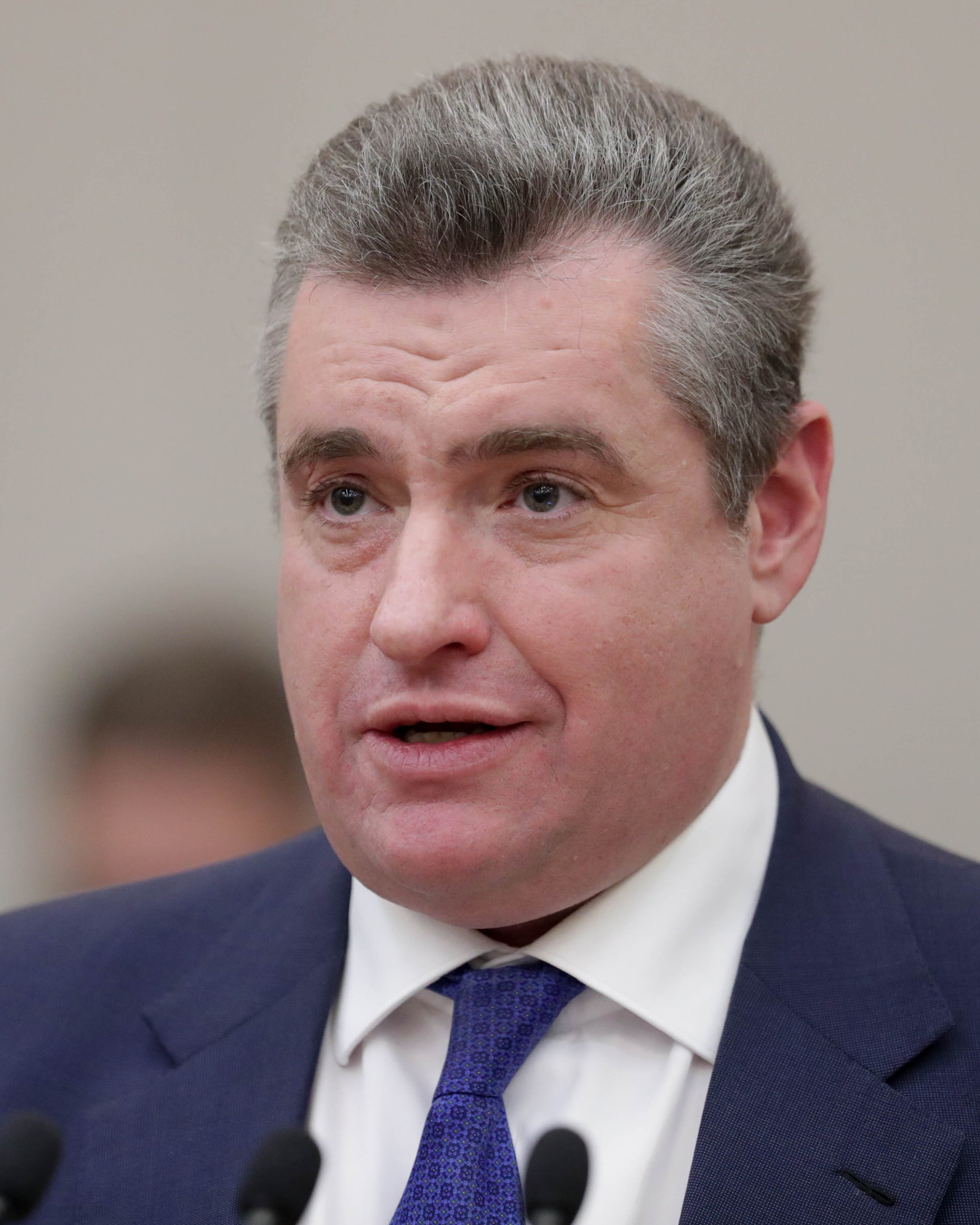
Leonid Slutsky
Liberal Democratic Party

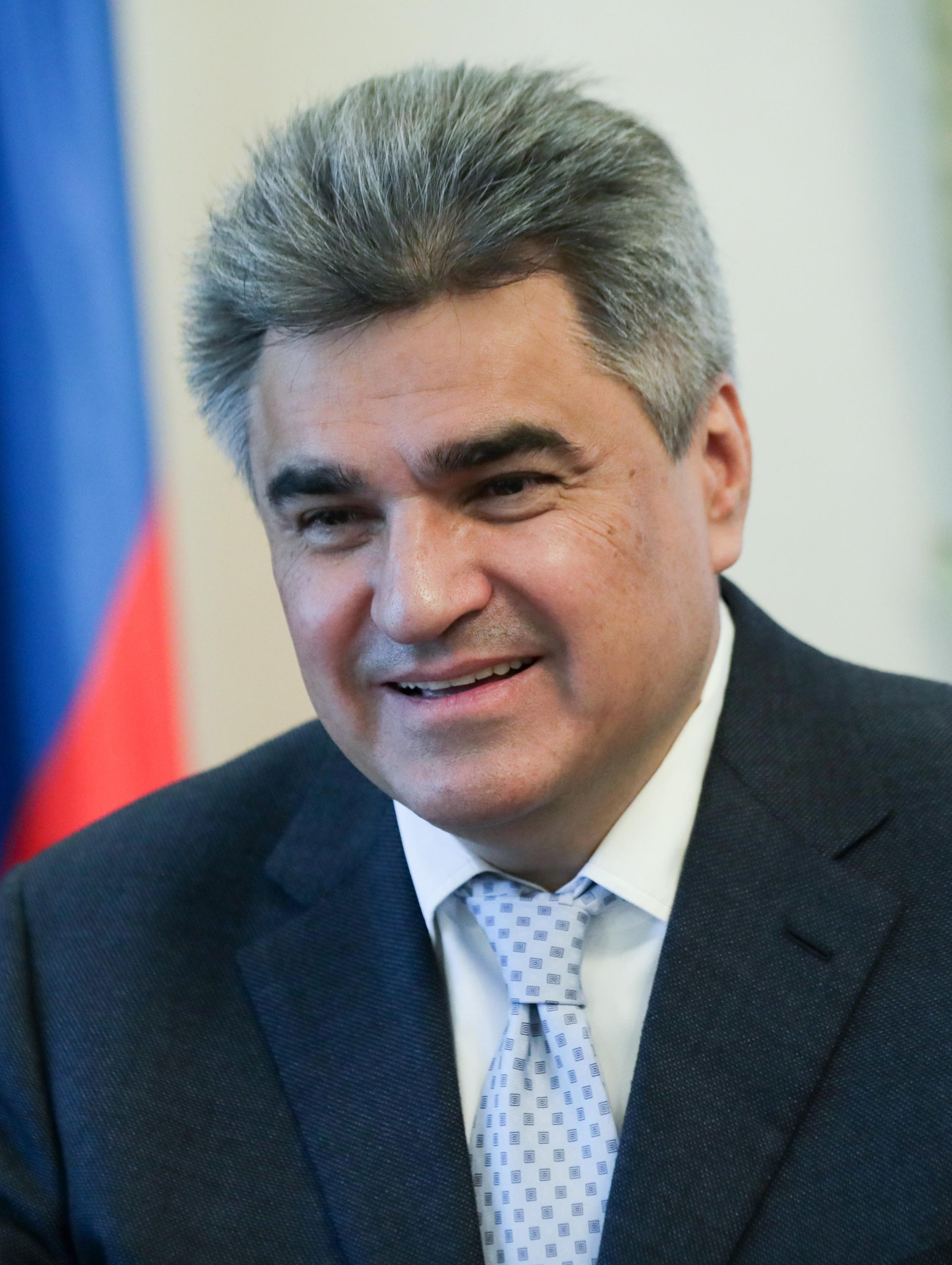
Alexey Nechayev
New People

The leadership of the State Duma where elected at the first meeting.

In accordance with the Constitution, the oldest deputy opens the first session. However, for the first time ever, the second oldest deputy opened the first meeting. This was because the oldest deputy, 85-year-old Vladimir Resin, refused to open the meeting and therefore this duty was passed to 84-year-old Valentina Tereshkova. In addition to Tereshkova, as per tradition, the presidium was also attended by the oldest deputies from each faction.

Office	MP	Period	Parliamentary affiliation
Chairman	Vyacheslav Volodin	12 October 2021 – 30 September 2026	United Russia
First Deputy Chairmen	Alexander Zhukov	12 October 2021 – 30 September 2026	United Russia
First Deputy Chairmen	Ivan Melnikov	12 October 2021 – 30 September 2026	Communist Party
Deputy Chairmen	Anna Kuznetsova	12 October 2021 – 30 September 2026	United Russia
Deputy Chairmen	Irina Yarovaya	12 October 2021 – 30 September 2026	United Russia
Deputy Chairmen	Pyotr Tolstoy	12 October 2021 – 30 September 2026	United Russia
Deputy Chairmen	Alexey Gordeyev	12 October 2021 – 30 September 2026	United Russia
Deputy Chairmen	Sholban Kara-ool	12 October 2021 – 30 September 2026	United Russia
Deputy Chairmen	Sergey Neverov	12 October 2021 – 23 July 2024	United Russia
Deputy Chairmen	Viktoria Abramchenko	17 September 2024 – 30 September 2026	United Russia
Deputy Chairmen	Alexander Babakov	12 October 2021 – 30 September 2026	A Just Russia
Deputy Chairmen	Boris Chernyshov	12 October 2021 – 30 September 2026	Liberal Democratic Party
Deputy Chairmen	Vladislav Davankov	12 October 2021 – 30 September 2026	New People
Faction leaders	Vladimir Vasilyev	12 October 2021 – 30 September 2026	United Russia
Faction leaders	Gennady Zyuganov	12 October 2021 – 30 September 2026	Communist Party
Faction leaders	Sergey Mironov	12 October 2021 – 30 September 2026	A Just Russia
Faction leaders	Vladimir Zhirinovsky	12 October 2021 – 6 April 2022	Liberal Democratic Party
Faction leaders	Leonid Slutsky	18 May 2022 – 30 September 2026 (acting 6 April – 18 May 2022)	Liberal Democratic Party
Faction leaders	Alexey Nechayev	12 October 2021 – 30 September 2026	New People

=== Chairman election ===
On 25 September 2021, during a meeting with the leaders of the parties elected to the State Duma, President Vladimir Putin expressed his support for the Chairman of the State Duma of the previous convocation Vyacheslav Volodin. Putin said that Volodin was worthy of becoming chairman again, but would leave the final decision to the deputies of the State Duma. After that, United Russia nominated Volodin for the position. Since United Russia has a majority in the State Duma, this means that Volodin will be elected speaker without the support of other parties. Nevertheless, the Liberal Democratic Party and A Just Russia — For Truth also endorsed Volodin.

The Communist Party refused to support Volodin and announced its intention to nominate its own candidate for the chairman. The Communists named Dmitry Novikov, Leonid Kalashnikov and Yury Afonin as possible candidates. On 7 October it was officially announced that the Communist Party would nominate Dmitry Novikov for Chairman of the State Duma.

The New People party did not nominate a candidate, but also did not publicly endorse any candidate.

Candidate	Votes	%
✓ Vyacheslav Volodin (UR)	360	80.0%
Dmitry Novikov (CPRF)	61	13.6%
Not voting	29	6.4%

== Factions ==
Five parties were able to overcome the 5% barrier in the elections and form their own factions. Candidates from three more parties were able to win in their constituencies, but they will not be able to form factions, since their parties did not pass the electoral barrier. They may to join the factions of other parties, or became unaffiliated deputies. Two of them joined the Liberal Democratic Party. Also, independent deputies were elected in five constituencies, who could also become unaffiliated, but joined the factions of political parties. Two deputies joined United Russia, two more joined New People and one joined A Just Russia — For Truth.

	(Shading indicates majority caucus)						Total	Vacant
	United Russia	Communist Party	A Just Russia (Note: A Just Russia – For Truth in October 2021 – October 2025)	Liberal Democratic Party	New People	Unaffiliated	Total	Vacant
End of the previous convocation	336	43	23	40	DNP	2	444	6
Seats won in election	324	57	27	21	13	8	450	0
October 12, 2021 (first session)	326	57	28	23	15	1	450	0
November 10, 2021 (Note: Yevgeny Marchenko was expelled from the United Russia faction and became an unaffiliated MP)	325	57	28	23	15	2	450	0
September 3, 2022 (Note: Alexey Chernyak resigned)	324	57	28	23	15	2	449	1
April 23, 2023 (Note: Nikolay Bortsov and Dzhasharbek Uzdenov died)	322	57	28	23	15	2	447	3
May 31, 2023 (Note: Viktor Zubarev died)	321	57	28	23	15	2	446	4
September 10, 2023 (Note: Dmitry Averov, Yury Nesterenko, Soltan Uzdenov and Sergey Yeryomin were elected)	325	57	28	23	15	2	450	0
September 19, 2023 (Note: Sergey Sokol resigned)	324	57	28	23	15	2	449	1
May 27, 2024 (Note: Vitaly Kushnarev resigned)	323	57	28	23	15	2	448	2
May 28, 2024 (Note: Nikolay Alekseyenko resigned)	322	57	28	23	15	2	447	3
June 25, 2024 (Note: Alexander Prokopyev resigned)	321	57	28	23	15	2	446	4
September 8, 2024 (Note: Viktoria Abramchenko, Oleg Matytsin and Nikolay Shulginov were elected)	323	57	28	23	15	3	449	1
September 16, 2024 (Note: Nikolay Shulginov (elected as Independent) joined United Russia faction)	324	57	28	23	15	2	449	1
October 8, 2024 (Note: Dmitry Khubezov resigned)	323	57	28	23	15	2	448	2
November 4, 2024 (Note: Yevgeny Pervyshov resigned)	322	57	28	23	15	2	447	3
December 5, 2024 (Note: Alexander Khinshtein resigned)	321	57	28	23	15	2	446	4
March 4, 2025 (Note: Anton Basansky resigned)	320	57	28	23	15	2	445	5
March 10, 2025 (Note: Dmitry Islamov resigned)	319	57	28	23	15	2	444	6
May 5, 2025 (Note: Pavel Kachkayev died)	318	57	28	23	15	2	443	7
May 19, 2025 (Note: Alexander Strelyukhin resigned)	317	57	28	23	15	2	442	8
May 20, 2025 (Note: Oleg Savchenko resigned)	316	57	28	23	15	2	441	9
June 25, 2025 (Note: Yaroslav Nilov was expelled from the LDPR faction and became an unaffiliated MP)	316	57	28	22	15	3	441	9
July 22, 2025 (Note: Mikhail Tarasenko died)	315	57	28	22	15	3	440	10
September 23, 2025 (Note: Mikhail Shchapov resigned)	315	56	28	22	15	3	439	11
December 30, 2025 (Note: Aidyn Saryglar resigned)	314	56	28	22	15	3	438	12
February 16, 2026 (Note: Viktor Dzyuba resigned)	313	56	28	22	15	3	437	13
March 23, 2026 (Note: Yury Shvytkin died)	312	56	28	22	15	3	436	14
April 8, 2026 (Note: Anatoly Lisitsyn was expelled from the A Just Russia faction and became an unaffiliated MP)	312	56	27	22	15	4	436	14
June 16, 2026 (Note: Yekaterina Kharchenko resigned)	311	56	27	22	15	4	435	15
June 17, 2026 (Note: Aleksandr Samokutyaev died)	310	56	27	22	15	4	434	16
September 17, 2026 (Note: Sergey Chepikov died)	309	56	27	22	15	4	433	17
Latest voting share	68.7%	12.4%	6.0%	4.9%	3.3%	0.9%	96.2%	3.8%

=== Vacant seats ===
Constituency		Region	Former Deputy	Former Party	Note
3	Ufa	Bashkortostan	Pavel Kachkayev	United Russia	
32	Tuva	Tuva	Aidyn Saryglar	United Russia	
41	Biysk	Altai Krai	Alexander Prokopyev	United Russia	
46	Krasnodar	Krasnodar Krai	Yevgeny Pervyshov	United Russia	
54	Krasnoyarsk	Krasnoyarsk Krai	Yury Shvytkin	United Russia	
84	Volzhsky	Volgograd Oblast	Oleg Savchenko	United Russia	
93	Irkutsk	Irkutsk Oblast	Mikhail Shchapov	Communist Party	
102	Prokopyevsk	Kemerovo Oblast	Dmitry Islamov	United Russia	
109	Kursk	Kursk Oblast	Yekaterina Kharchenko	United Russia	
115	Levoberezhny	Lipetsk Oblast	Mikhail Tarasenko	United Russia	
116	Magadan	Magadan Oblast	Anton Basansky	United Russia	
147	Lermontovsky	Penza Oblast	Aleksandr Samokutyaev	United Russia	
157	Skopin	Ryazan Oblast	Dmitry Khubezov	United Russia	
158	Samara	Samara Oblast	Alexander Khinshtein	United Russia	
166	Engels	Saratov Oblast	Alexander Strelyukhin	United Russia	
170	Beryozovsky	Sverdlovsk Oblast	Sergey Chepikov	United Russia	
183	Tula	Tula Oblast	Viktor Dzyuba	United Russia	

== Committees and commissions ==
=== Committees ===
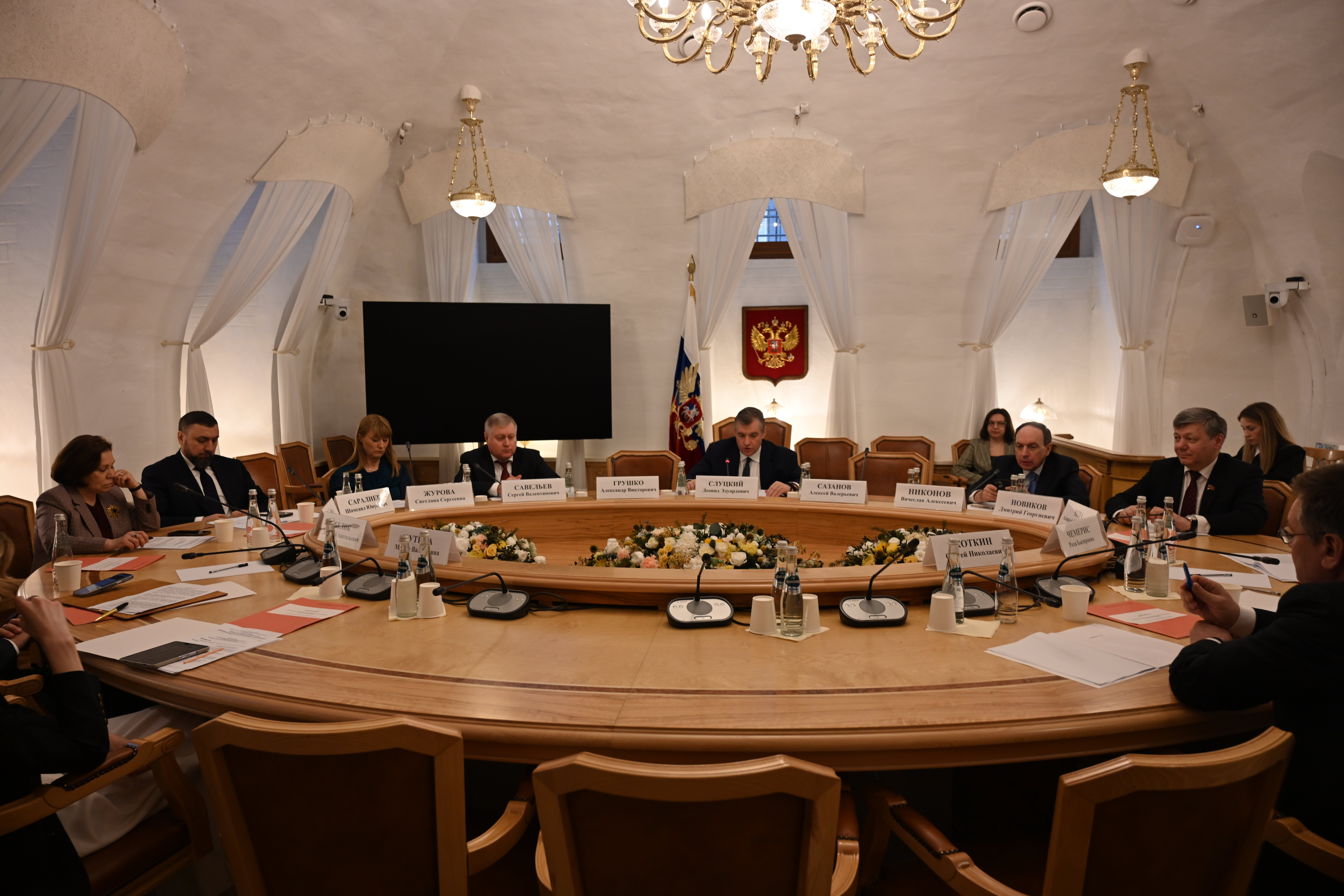
Session of the State Duma Committee on International Affairs on April 10, 2024

In the 8th convocation, the number of committees was increased from 26 to 32. According to Vyacheslav Volodin, the increase in committees is due to the expanded powers of the parliament during the constitutional reform. Since the State Duma approves the members of the government, it was decided to create committees based on the profile of line federal ministries, agencies and services.

On 8 October 2021, during the meeting of the provisional working group on the preparation of the first plenary session, the composition of the committees and their leadership were approved.

Committee issues	Chair	Parties
Agrarian Issues	Vladimir Kashin	United Russia (15)
Agrarian Issues	Vladimir Kashin	Communist Party (4)
Agrarian Issues	Vladimir Kashin	A Just Russia (1)
Budget and Taxes	Andrey Makarov	United Russia (22)
Budget and Taxes	Andrey Makarov	Communist Party (4)
Budget and Taxes	Andrey Makarov	A Just Russia (1)
Budget and Taxes	Andrey Makarov	Liberal Democratic Party (1)
Budget and Taxes	Andrey Makarov	Party of Growth (1)
Commonwealth of Independent States Affairs, Eurasian Integration and Relations with Compatriots	Leonid Kalashnikov	United Russia (5)
Commonwealth of Independent States Affairs, Eurasian Integration and Relations with Compatriots	Leonid Kalashnikov	Communist Party (3)
Construction and Housing and Communal Services	Sergey Pakhomov	United Russia (16)
Construction and Housing and Communal Services	Sergey Pakhomov	Communist Party (2)
Construction and Housing and Communal Services	Sergey Pakhomov	A Just Russia (1)
Construction and Housing and Communal Services	Sergey Pakhomov	Liberal Democratic Party (1)
Control	Oleg Morozov	United Russia (9)
Control	Oleg Morozov	Communist Party (1)
Control	Oleg Morozov	A Just Russia (1)
Culture	Yelena Yampolskaya (until May 14, 2024)	United Russia (5)
Culture	Yelena Yampolskaya (until May 14, 2024)	A Just Russia (2)
Culture	Olga Kazakova (since September 17, 2024)	Communist Party (1)
Culture	Olga Kazakova (since September 17, 2024)	Liberal Democratic Party (1)
Culture	Olga Kazakova (since September 17, 2024)	New People (1)
Defence	Andrey Kartapolov	United Russia (10)
Defence	Andrey Kartapolov	Communist Party (2)
Defence	Andrey Kartapolov	Liberal Democratic Party (1)
Development of Civil Society, Issues of Public and Religious Associations	Olga Timofeeva (until February 26, 2025)	United Russia (5)
Development of Civil Society, Issues of Public and Religious Associations	Olga Timofeeva (until February 26, 2025)	Communist Party (1)
Development of Civil Society, Issues of Public and Religious Associations	Yana Lantratova (February 26, 2025 – May 14, 2026)	A Just Russia (1)
Development of Civil Society, Issues of Public and Religious Associations	Nikolay Novichkov (acting, since June 9, 2026)	New People (1)
Development of the Far East and Arctic	Nikolai Kharitonov	United Russia (8)
Development of the Far East and Arctic	Nikolai Kharitonov	Communist Party (2)
Development of the Far East and Arctic	Nikolai Kharitonov	A Just Russia (1)
Development of the Far East and Arctic	Nikolai Kharitonov	Liberal Democratic Party (1)
Ecology, Natural Resources and Environmental Protection	Dmitry Kobylkin	United Russia (18)
Ecology, Natural Resources and Environmental Protection	Dmitry Kobylkin	Communist Party (2)
Ecology, Natural Resources and Environmental Protection	Dmitry Kobylkin	A Just Russia (2)
Ecology, Natural Resources and Environmental Protection	Dmitry Kobylkin	Liberal Democratic Party (1)
Ecology, Natural Resources and Environmental Protection	Dmitry Kobylkin	New People (1)
Economic Policy	Maxim Topilin	United Russia (8)
Economic Policy	Maxim Topilin	Communist Party (1)
Economic Policy	Maxim Topilin	Liberal Democratic Party (1)
Economic Policy	Maxim Topilin	A Just Russia (1)
Education	Olga Kazakova (until September 17, 2024)	United Russia (7)
Education	Olga Kazakova (until September 17, 2024)	A Just Russia (2)
Education	Irina Belykh (since September 17, 2024)	Communist Party (1)
Education	Irina Belykh (since September 17, 2024)	New People (1)
Energy	Pavel Zavalny (until July 23, 2024)	United Russia (9)
Energy	Pavel Zavalny (until July 23, 2024)	Communist Party (1)
Energy	Pavel Zavalny (until July 23, 2024)	A Just Russia (1)
Energy	Nikolay Shulginov (since September 17, 2024)	Liberal Democratic Party (1)
Energy	Nikolay Shulginov (since September 17, 2024)	New People (1)
Family, Women and Children	Nina Ostanina	United Russia (5)
Family, Women and Children	Nina Ostanina	Communist Party (2)
Financial Market	Anatoly Aksakov	United Russia (6)
Financial Market	Anatoly Aksakov	Communist Party (2)
Financial Market	Anatoly Aksakov	A Just Russia (1)
Financial Market	Anatoly Aksakov	Liberal Democratic Party (1)
Health	Dmitry Khubezov (until June 13, 2023)	United Russia (14)
Health	Badma Bashankayev (June 13, 2023 – November 26, 2024)	Communist Party (2)
Health	Badma Bashankayev (June 13, 2023 – November 26, 2024)	A Just Russia (1)
Health	Sergey Leonov (since November 26, 2024)	Liberal Democratic Party (1)
Industry and Trade	Vladimir Gutenev	United Russia (16)
Industry and Trade	Vladimir Gutenev	Communist Party (1)
Industry and Trade	Vladimir Gutenev	A Just Russia (1)
Industry and Trade	Vladimir Gutenev	New People (1)
Information Policy, Information Technologies and Communications	Alexander Hinstein (until December 5, 2024)	United Russia (6)
Information Policy, Information Technologies and Communications	Alexander Hinstein (until December 5, 2024)	Communist Party (1)
Information Policy, Information Technologies and Communications	Sergey Boyarsky (since December 17, 2024)	New People (1)
Information Policy, Information Technologies and Communications	Sergey Boyarsky (since December 17, 2024)	Liberal Democratic Party (1)
Information Policy, Information Technologies and Communications	Sergey Boyarsky (since December 17, 2024)	A Just Russia (1)
International Affairs	Leonid Slutsky	United Russia (11)
International Affairs	Leonid Slutsky	Communist Party (1)
International Affairs	Leonid Slutsky	A Just Russia (1)
International Affairs	Leonid Slutsky	Liberal Democratic Party (1)
International Affairs	Leonid Slutsky	New People (1)
Labour, Social Policy and Veterans' Affairs	Yaroslav Nilov (Note: initially elected as LDPR member, expelled from the faction in June 2025)	United Russia (8)
Labour, Social Policy and Veterans' Affairs	Yaroslav Nilov	Communist Party (2)
Labour, Social Policy and Veterans' Affairs	Yaroslav Nilov	Independent (1)
Nationalities Affairs	Gennady Semigin (until June 11, 2024)	United Russia (5)
Nationalities Affairs	Vladimir Ivanov (since February 26, 2025)	Communist Party (1)
Nationalities Affairs	Vladimir Ivanov (since February 26, 2025)	A Just Russia (1)
Physical Culture and Sport	Dmitry Svishchev (until July 23, 2024)	United Russia (8)
Physical Culture and Sport	Dmitry Svishchev (until July 23, 2024)	Liberal Democratic Party (2)
Physical Culture and Sport	Oleg Matytsin (since September 17, 2024)	Communist Party (1)
Physical Culture and Sport	Oleg Matytsin (since September 17, 2024)	New People (1)
Property, Land and Property Relations	Sergey Gavrilov	United Russia (9)
Property, Land and Property Relations	Sergey Gavrilov	Communist Party (4)
Property, Land and Property Relations	Sergey Gavrilov	Liberal Democratic Party (1)
Protection of Competition	Valery Gartung	United Russia (5)
Protection of Competition	Valery Gartung	A Just Russia (2)
Protection of Competition	Valery Gartung	Communist Party (1)
Regional Policy and Local Government	Alexei Didenko	United Russia (7)
Regional Policy and Local Government	Alexei Didenko	Communist Party (1)
Regional Policy and Local Government	Alexei Didenko	A Just Russia (1)
Regional Policy and Local Government	Alexei Didenko	Liberal Democratic Party (1)
Regional Policy and Local Government	Alexei Didenko	New People (1)
Safety and Anti-Corruption	Vasily Piskarev	United Russia (19)
Safety and Anti-Corruption	Vasily Piskarev	Communist Party (3)
Safety and Anti-Corruption	Vasily Piskarev	Liberal Democratic Party (1)
Safety and Anti-Corruption	Vasily Piskarev	Independent (1)
Science and Higher Education	Sergey Kabyshev	United Russia (6)
Science and Higher Education	Sergey Kabyshev	Communist Party (1)
Science and Higher Education	Sergey Kabyshev	A Just Russia (1)
Science and Higher Education	Sergey Kabyshev	Liberal Democratic Party (1)
Science and Higher Education	Sergey Kabyshev	New People (1)
Small and Medium-sized Entrepreneurship	Alexander Demin	United Russia (5)
Small and Medium-sized Entrepreneurship	Alexander Demin	Communist Party (1)
Small and Medium-sized Entrepreneurship	Alexander Demin	A Just Russia (1)
Small and Medium-sized Entrepreneurship	Alexander Demin	New People (1)
State Construction and Legislation	Pavel Krasheninnikov	United Russia (10)
State Construction and Legislation	Pavel Krasheninnikov	Communist Party (3)
State Construction and Legislation	Pavel Krasheninnikov	A Just Russia (1)
State Construction and Legislation	Pavel Krasheninnikov	Liberal Democratic Party (1)
Tourism and Tourism Infrastructure Development	Sangadji Tarbaev	United Russia (11)
Tourism and Tourism Infrastructure Development	Sangadji Tarbaev	Communist Party (1)
Tourism and Tourism Infrastructure Development	Sangadji Tarbaev	New People (1)
Transport and Transport Infrastructure Development	Yevgeny Moskvichev	United Russia (18)
Transport and Transport Infrastructure Development	Yevgeny Moskvichev	Communist Party (1)
Transport and Transport Infrastructure Development	Yevgeny Moskvichev	Liberal Democratic Party (1)
Youth Policy	Artem Metelev	United Russia (6)
Youth Policy	Artem Metelev	Communist Party (1)

=== Commissions ===
Commission issues	Chair (co–chairs)	Parties
Control Over the Reliability of Information on Income, Property and Property Obligations; Submitted by Members of the State Duma and Mandate Issues	Otari Arshba	United Russia (11)
Control Over the Reliability of Information on Income, Property and Property Obligations; Submitted by Members of the State Duma and Mandate Issues	Otari Arshba	Communist Party (4)
Control Over the Reliability of Information on Income, Property and Property Obligations; Submitted by Members of the State Duma and Mandate Issues	Otari Arshba	A Just Russia (2)
Control Over the Reliability of Information on Income, Property and Property Obligations; Submitted by Members of the State Duma and Mandate Issues	Otari Arshba	Liberal Democratic Party (2)
Control Over the Reliability of Information on Income, Property and Property Obligations; Submitted by Members of the State Duma and Mandate Issues	Otari Arshba	New People (1)
Counting Commission	Raisa Karmazina	United Russia (8)
Counting Commission	Raisa Karmazina	Communist Party (2)
Counting Commission	Raisa Karmazina	A Just Russia (1)
Counting Commission	Raisa Karmazina	Liberal Democratic Party (1)
Counting Commission	Raisa Karmazina	New People (1)
Ensuring the Housing Rights of Citizens (since February 22, 2022)	Galina Khovanskaya	United Russia (13)
Ensuring the Housing Rights of Citizens (since February 22, 2022)	Galina Khovanskaya	A Just Russia (4)
Ensuring the Housing Rights of Citizens (since February 22, 2022)	Galina Khovanskaya	Communist Party (2)
Ensuring the Housing Rights of Citizens (since February 22, 2022)	Galina Khovanskaya	New People (2)
Ensuring the Housing Rights of Citizens (since February 22, 2022)	Galina Khovanskaya	Liberal Democratic Party (1)
Ensuring the Housing Rights of Citizens (since February 22, 2022)	Galina Khovanskaya	Party of Growth (1)
Investigation of Foreign Interference in Domestic Affairs of Russia (since March 23, 2022)	Vasily Piskaryov	United Russia (7)
Investigation of Foreign Interference in Domestic Affairs of Russia (since March 23, 2022)	Vasily Piskaryov	Communist Party (2)
Investigation of Foreign Interference in Domestic Affairs of Russia (since March 23, 2022)	Vasily Piskaryov	A Just Russia (2)
Investigation of Foreign Interference in Domestic Affairs of Russia (since March 23, 2022)	Vasily Piskaryov	Liberal Democratic Party (2)
Investigation of Foreign Interference in Domestic Affairs of Russia (since March 23, 2022)	Vasily Piskaryov	New People (2)
Migration Policy Issues (since July 26, 2024)	Irina Yarovaya	United Russia (8)
Migration Policy Issues (since July 26, 2024)	Irina Yarovaya	Liberal Democratic Party (2)
Migration Policy Issues (since July 26, 2024)	Irina Yarovaya	Communist Party (1)
Migration Policy Issues (since July 26, 2024)	Irina Yarovaya	A Just Russia (1)
Migration Policy Issues (since July 26, 2024)	Irina Yarovaya	New People (1)
Parliamentary Ethics	Valentina Tereshkova	United Russia (11)
Parliamentary Ethics	Valentina Tereshkova	Communist Party (4)
Parliamentary Ethics	Valentina Tereshkova	A Just Russia (2)
Parliamentary Ethics	Valentina Tereshkova	Liberal Democratic Party (1)
Parliamentary Ethics	Valentina Tereshkova	New People (1)
Parliamentary Ethics	Valentina Tereshkova	Independent (1)
Regulations and Ensuring the Activities of the State Duma	Viktor Pinsky	United Russia (6)
Regulations and Ensuring the Activities of the State Duma	Viktor Pinsky	Communist Party (1)
Regulations and Ensuring the Activities of the State Duma	Viktor Pinsky	A Just Russia (1)
Regulations and Ensuring the Activities of the State Duma	Viktor Pinsky	Liberal Democratic Party (1)
Regulations and Ensuring the Activities of the State Duma	Viktor Pinsky	New People (1)
Review of Federal Budget Expenditures Aimed at Ensuring National Defense, National Security and Law Enforcement	Andrey Kartapolov; Andrey Makarov; Vasily Piskaryov	United Russia (14)
Review of Federal Budget Expenditures Aimed at Ensuring National Defense, National Security and Law Enforcement	Andrey Kartapolov; Andrey Makarov; Vasily Piskaryov	Communist Party (4)
Review of Federal Budget Expenditures Aimed at Ensuring National Defense, National Security and Law Enforcement	Andrey Kartapolov; Andrey Makarov; Vasily Piskaryov	A Just Russia (3)
Review of Federal Budget Expenditures Aimed at Ensuring National Defense, National Security and Law Enforcement	Andrey Kartapolov; Andrey Makarov; Vasily Piskaryov	Liberal Democratic Party (1)

== Major legislation ==
=== First session ===
- November 24, 2021: Federal Budget for 2022 passed with 337 votes in favor.
- December 14, 2021: Federal Law "On the General Principles of the Organization of Public Authority in the Subjects of the Russian Federation" (Law on Regional Authorities) passed with 330 votes in favor.

=== Second session ===
- February 22, 2022: Treaty of Friendship, Cooperation and Mutual Assistance between Russia and the Donetsk People's Republic ratified with 400 votes in favor.
- February 22, 2022: Treaty of Friendship, Cooperation and Mutual Assistance between Russia and the Luhansk People's Republic ratified with 399 votes in favor.

=== Third session ===
- October 3, 2022: Treaty between the Russian Federation and the Donetsk People's Republic on the admission of the Donetsk People's Republic to the Russian Federation and the formation of a new federal subject of the Russian Federation ratified with 413 votes in favor.
- October 3, 2022: Federal Constitutional Law "On the admission of the Donetsk People's Republic to the Russian Federation and the formation of a new federal subject of the Russian Federation – the Donetsk People's Republic" passed with 413 votes in favor.
- October 3, 2022: Treaty between the Russian Federation and the Luhansk People's Republic on the admission of the Luhansk People's Republic to the Russian Federation and the formation of a new federal subject of the Russian Federation ratified with 412 votes in favor.
- October 3, 2022: Federal Constitutional Law "On the admission of the Luhansk People's Republic to the Russian Federation and the formation of a new federal subject of the Russian Federation – the Luhansk People's Republic" passed with 413 votes in favor.
- October 3, 2022: Treaty between the Russian Federation and Zaporozhye Oblast on the admission of Zaporozhye Oblast to the Russian Federation and the formation of a new federal subject of the Russian Federation ratified with 409 votes in favor.
- October 3, 2022: Federal Constitutional Law "On the admission of Zaporozhye Oblast to the Russian Federation and the formation of a new federal subject of the Russian Federation – the Zaporozhye Oblast" passed with 410 votes in favor.
- October 3, 2022: Treaty between the Russian Federation and Kherson Oblast on the admission of Kherson Oblast to the Russian Federation and the formation of a new federal subject of the Russian Federation ratified with 411 votes in favor.
- October 3, 2022: Federal Constitutional Law "On the admission of Kherson to the Russian Federation and the formation of a new federal subject of the Russian Federation – the Kherson" passed with 411 votes in favor.
- November 24, 2022: Federal Budget for 2023 passed with 320 votes in favor.
- November 14, 2021: Federal Law on Amendments to the Federal Law "On Information, Information Technologies and Information Protection" and Certain Legislative Acts of the Russian Federation" (regarding the prohibition of propaganda of non-traditional sexual relations and (or) preferences) passed with 397 votes in favor.

=== Fifth session ===
- November 17, 2023: Federal Budget for 2024 passed with 325 votes in favor.

=== Sixth session ===
- July 10, 2024: Federal Law on Amendments to the Tax Code of the Russian Federation regarding the introduction of a progressive scale of taxation passed with 409 votes in favor.

=== Seventh session ===
- October 24, 2024: Treaty between Russia and North Korea on comprehensive strategic partnership ratified with 397 votes in favor.
- November 21, 2024: Federal Law on childfree propaganda prohibition passed with 403 votes in favor.
- November 21, 2024: Federal Budget for 2025 passed with 335 votes in favor.

=== Ninth session ===
- November 20, 2025: Federal Budget for 2026 passed with 348 votes in favor.

== Major appointments ==
=== Cabinet ===
==== First Mishustin Cabinet ====
- July 15, 2022: Denis Manturov approved as Deputy Prime Minister of Russia with 394 votes in favor.

==== Second Mishustin Cabinet ====
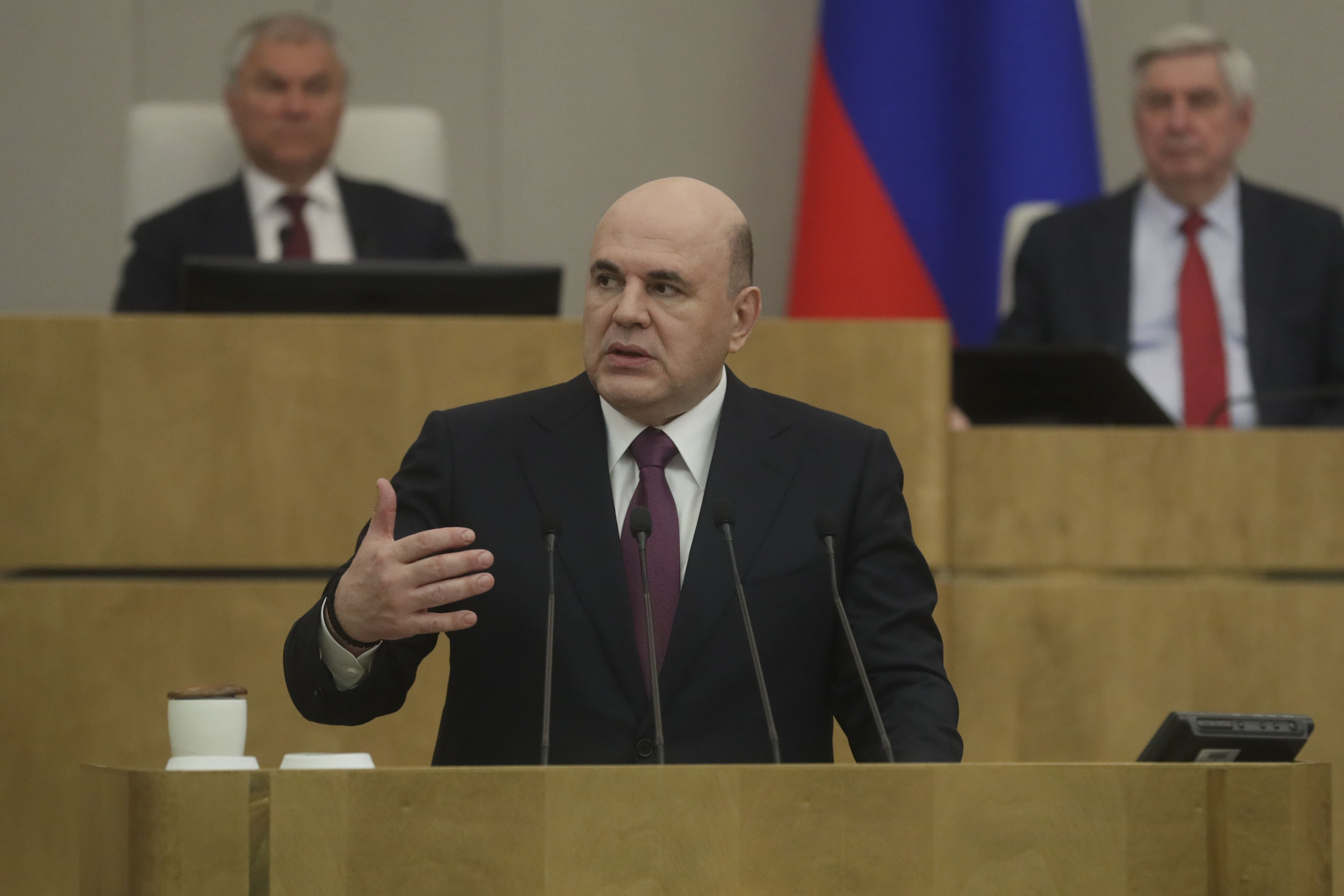
Mishustin at his confirmation hearing on May 10, 2024

- May 10, 2024: Mikhail Mishustin re-approved as Prime Minister of Russia with 375 votes in favor.
- May 13, 2024: Denis Manturov approved as First Deputy Prime Minister of Russia with 431 votes in favor.
- May 13, 2024: Dmitry Grigorenko re-approved as Deputy Prime Minister of Russia — Chief of Staff of the Government with 378 votes in favor.
- May 13, 2024: Yury Trutnev re-approved as Deputy Prime Minister of Russia — Presidential Envoy to the Far Eastern Federal District with 376 votes in favor.
- May 13, 2024: Dmitry Patrushev approved as Deputy Prime Minister of Russia with 433 votes in favor.
- May 13, 2024: Marat Khusnullin re-approved as Deputy Prime Minister of Russia with 347 votes in favor.
- May 13, 2024: Alexey Overchuk re-approved as Deputy Prime Minister of Russia with 378 votes in favor.
- May 13, 2024: Alexander Novak re-approved as Deputy Prime Minister of Russia with 378 votes in favor.
- May 13, 2024: Tatyana Golikova re-approved as Deputy Prime Minister of Russia with 362 votes in favor.
- May 13, 2024: Dmitry Chernyshenko re-approved as Deputy Prime Minister of Russia with 432 votes in favor.
- May 13, 2024: Vitaly Savelyev approved as Deputy Prime Minister of Russia with 378 votes in favor.
- May 14, 2024: Oksana Lut approved as Minister of Agriculture of Russia with 429 votes in favor.
- May 14, 2024: Irek Faizullin re-approved as Minister for Construction and Housing of Russia with 350 votes in favor.
- May 14, 2024: Olga Lyubimova re-approved as Minister of Culture of Russia with 357 votes in favor.
- May 14, 2024: Aleksey Chekunkov re-approved as Minister for Development of the Russian Far East and Arctic with 428 votes in favor.
- May 14, 2024: Maxut Shadayev re-approved as Minister of Digital Development, Communications and Mass Media of Russia with 373 votes in favor.
- May 14, 2024: Maxim Reshetnikov re-approved as Minister of Economic Development of Russia with 348 votes in favor.
- May 14, 2024: Sergey Kravtsov re-approved as Minister of Education of Russia with 345 votes in favor.
- May 14, 2024: Sergey Tsivilyov approved as Minister of Energy of Russia with 375 votes in favor.
- May 14, 2024: Anton Siluanov re-approved as Minister of Finance of Russia with 348 votes in favor.
- May 14, 2024: Mikhail Murashko re-approved as Minister of Health of Russia with 374 votes in favor.
- May 14, 2024: Anton Alikhanov approved as Minister of Industry and Trade of Russia with 430 votes in favor.
- May 14, 2024: Anton Kotyakov re-approved as Minister of Labour and Social Protection of Russia with 348 votes in favor.
- May 14, 2024: Alexander Kozlov re-approved as Minister of Natural Resources and Ecology of Russia with 349 votes in favor.
- May 14, 2024: Valery Falkov re-approved as Minister of Science and Higher Education of Russia with 373 votes in favor.
- May 14, 2024: Mikhail Degtyarev approved as Minister of Sport of Russia with 350 votes in favor.
- May 14, 2024: Roman Starovoyt approved as Minister of Transport of Russia with 429 votes in favor.
  - July 8, 2025: Andrey Nikitin approved as Minister of Transport of Russia with 408 votes in favor.

=== Non-cabinet ===
- April 21, 2022: Elvira Nabiullina re-approved as Governor of the Central Bank of Russia with 338 votes in favor.
- September 23, 2025: Igor Kagramanyan (United Russia) approved as Auditor of the Accounts Chamber of Russia with 407 votes in favor.
- September 23, 2025: Oleg Nilov (A Just Russia) approved as Auditor of the Accounts Chamber of Russia with 405 votes in favor.
- September 23, 2025: Mikhail Shchapov (CPRF) approved as Auditor of the Accounts Chamber of Russia with 409 votes in favor.
- September 23, 2025: Maksim Zaytsev (LDPR) approved as Auditor of the Accounts Chamber of Russia with 409 votes in favor.
- September 23, 2025: Daniel Shilkov (New People) re-approved as Auditor of the Accounts Chamber of Russia with 407 votes in favor.
- September 25, 2025: Galina Izotova re-approved as Deputy Chairwoman of the Accounts Chamber of Russia with 386 votes in favor.
- March 11, 2026: Alyona Bulgakova (New People) approved as Member of the Central Election Commission with 402 votes in favor.
- March 11, 2026: Yevgeny Kolyushin (CPRF) re-approved as Member of the Central Election Commission with 403 votes in favor.
- March 11, 2026: Vasilina Kuliyeva (LDPR) approved as Member of the Central Election Commission with 401 votes in favor.
- March 11, 2026: Nikolai Levichev (A Just Russia) re-approved as Member of the Central Election Commission with 402 votes in favor.
- March 11, 2026: Konstantin Mazurevsky (United Russia) re-approved as Member of the Central Election Commission with 402 votes in favor.
- May 14, 2026: Yana Lantratova (A Just Russia) approved as Commissioner for Human Rights in Russia with 301 votes in favour. Ivan Sukharev (LDPR) received 75 votes, Artem Prokofiev (CPRF) – 62 votes.

== Major events ==
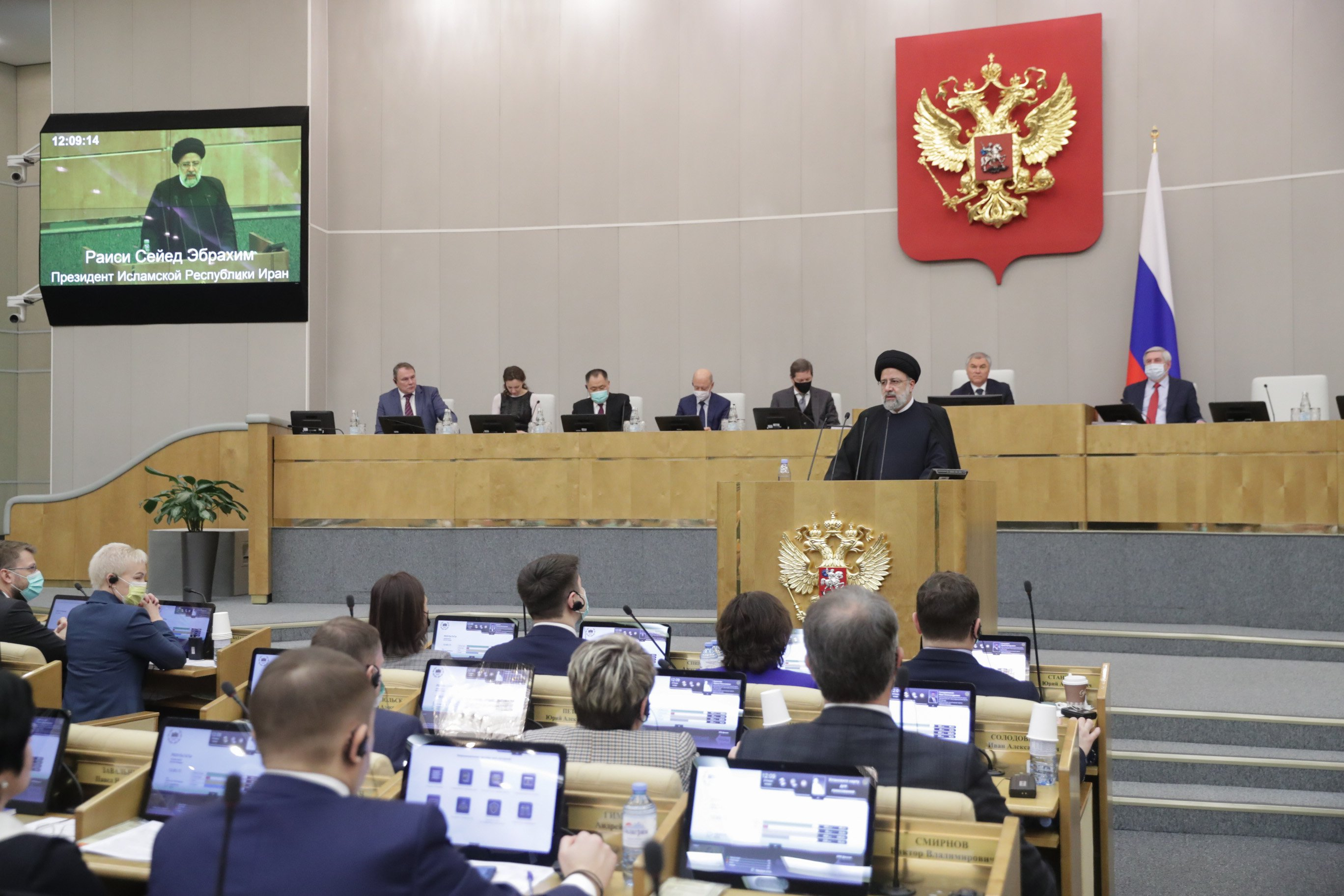
Iranian President Ebrahim Raisi addressed the State Duma on January 20, 2022.

- October 12, 2021: Opening of the 8th State Duma.
- January 20, 2022: Iranian President Ebrahim Raisi addressed a session of the State Duma.
- April 7, 2022: Annual report of Prime Minister Mikhail Mishustin on the work of the Government of Russia in 2021.
- April 21, 2022: Annual report of the Central Bank Governor Elvira Nabiullina on the work of the Central Bank of Russia in 2021.
- November 22, 2022: Cuban President Miguel Díaz-Canel addressed a session of the State Duma.
- February 21, 2023: President Vladimir Putin addresses a joint session of the Federal Assembly.
- March 23, 2023: Annual report of Prime Minister Mikhail Mishustin on the work of the Government of Russia in 2022.
- March 29, 2023: Annual report of the Central Bank Governor Elvira Nabiullina on the work of the Central Bank of Russia in 2022.
- February 29, 2024: President Vladimir Putin addresses a joint session of the Federal Assembly.
- March 29, 2024: Annual report of the Central Bank Governor Elvira Nabiullina on the work of the Central Bank of Russia in 2023.
- April 3, 2024: Annual report of Prime Minister Mikhail Mishustin on the work of the Government of Russia in 2023.
- May 7, 2024: The fifth inauguration of Vladimir Putin takes place.
- March 26, 2025: Annual report of Prime Minister Mikhail Mishustin on the work of the Government of Russia in 2024.
- April 9, 2025: Annual report of the Central Bank Governor Elvira Nabiullina on the work of the Central Bank of Russia in 2024.
- February 25, 2026: Annual report of Prime Minister Mikhail Mishustin on the work of the Government of Russia in 2025.

== See also ==
- List of members of the 8th Russian State Duma
