= Nikolay Novichkov =

Russian politician

Nikolay Novichkov MP
- Николай Новичков
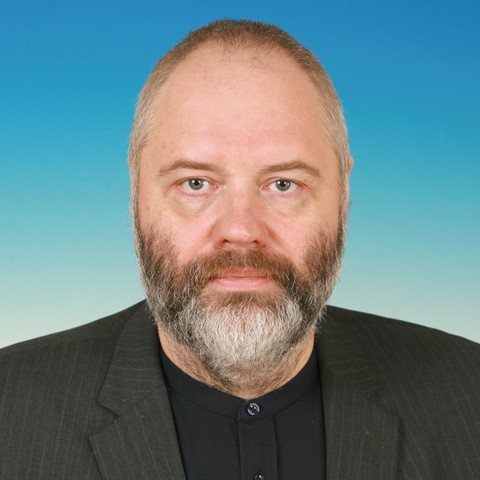
- official portrait, circa 2021

Member of the State Duma (Party List Seat)
- Incumbent
- Assumed office 12 October 2021

Personal details
- Born: 24 December 1974 (age 51) Velikovo, Gorokhovetsky District, Vladimir Oblast, RSFSR, USSR
- Party: A Just Russia — For Truth
- Education: Volga-Vyatka Academy of Public Administration

Nikolay Vladimirovich Novichkov (Russian: Николай Владимирович Новичков, born 24 December 1974 in Vladimir Oblast) is a Russian political figure and a deputy of the 8th State Dumas.

In 1995, Novichkov became one of the winners of the All-Russian student competition "The Future Prime Minister of Russia", organized by the International Fund "Reform". In the second half of the 1990s, he was a Member of the Congress of Russian Communities. In 1996, he joined the Socialist People's Party of Russia of Martin Shakkum. In 1998, he was appointed Deputy Chairman of the movement "Native Fatherland" but was expelled from the party in 2006. From 1998 to 2009, he taught foundations of management at the State University of Management. At the end of the 2000s, Novichkov worked as an advisor to the politician and one of the leaders of the Rodina party Alexander Babakov. From 2009 to 2012, Novichkov headed the National Association of Volunteer Organizations (NADO). In 2010-2012, he was a professor at the Perm branch of the Higher School of Economics. In 2017, he worked as an advisor to the governor of the Novgorod Oblast Andrey Nikitin. Since September 2021, he has served as deputy of the 8th State Duma.

== Sanctions ==
He was sanctioned by the UK government in 2022 in relation to the Russo-Ukrainian War.
