= Let History Judge =

Book by Roy Medvedev

- 1989 edition
- Author: Roy Medvedev
- Original title: К суду истории
- Language: Russian
- Genre: History
- Publication date: 1969

Let History Judge (Russian: К суду истории, Before the Court of History) is a Soviet history book by Roy Medvedev that critiques Stalinism from a Marxist perspective. Its publication in 1969 resulted in Medvedev's expulsion from the Communist Party and in subsequent harassment.

Medvedev said of his methodology that "I did not make use of or have access to any closed archives, “special collections,” or any other limited-access depositories and I am not familiar with any" and "there could not be a published source for much of the information in this book; it was passed on by the victims of repression or their friends or relatives".

The book was republished in expanded form in 1989.
