= Nikolay Ivanov (politician, born 1957) =

Russian politician (born 1957)

Nikolay Ivanov MP
- Николай Иванов
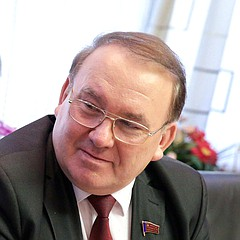

Member of the State Duma (Party List Seat)
- Incumbent
- Assumed office 21 December 2016

Member of the State Duma for Kursk Oblast
- In office 18 January 2000 – 29 December 2003
- Preceded by: Alexander Mikhailov
- Succeeded by: Alexander Chukhrayov
- Constituency: Kursk (No. 96)

Personal details
- Born: 17 January 1957 (age 69) Kursk, RSFSR, USSR
- Party: CPRF
- Education: Kursk State University; North Caucasus Socio-Political Institute; Youth Institute; Oryol Regional Academy of Public Administration

Nikolay Nikolaevich Ivanov (Russian: Николай Николаевич Иванов; born January 17, 1957, Kursk) is a Russian political figure and a deputy of the 3rd, 6th, 7th, and 8th State Dumas.

From 1979 to 1981, Ivanov served at the Soviet Army. From 1981 to 1987, he served as an instructor and then as head of the department of the Kursk Regional Committee of the Komsomol. From 1997 to 1998, he was the Deputy Chairman of the Governor of Kursk Oblast Alexander Rutskoy. In December 1996, he was elected to the Kursk Oblast Duma. From 1999 to 2003, he was the deputy of the 3rd State Duma. In 2006 and 2011, he was elected to the Kursk Oblast Duma of the 4th and 5th convocations. He left the post to become deputy of the 6th State Duma. In 2016 and 2021, he was re-elected for the 7th, and 8th State Dumas.

== Sanctions ==
He was sanctioned by the UK government in 2022 in relation to the Russo-Ukrainian War.
