= Dmitry Islamov =

Russian politician (born 1977)

- Дмитрий Исламов
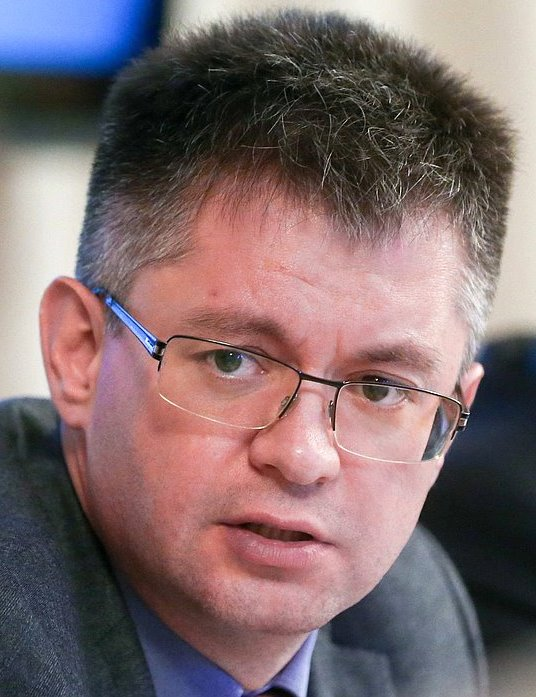
- Islamov in 2018

Member of the State Duma for Kemerovo Oblast
- Incumbent
- Assumed office 5 October 2016
- Preceded by: constituency re-established
- Constituency: Prokopyevsk (No. 102)

Deputy minister of energy
- Incumbent
- Assumed office 11 March 2025
- Preceded by: Anastasia Bondarenko

Personal details
- Born: 5 December 1977 (age 48) Kemerovo, RSFSR, USSR
- Party: United Russia
- Education: Kuzbass State Technical University

Dmitry Victorovich Islamov (Russian: Дмитрий Викторович Исламов; born December 5, 1977) is a Russian political figure and a deputy of the 7th and 8th State Dumas.

After graduating from the Kuzbass State Technical University in 2000, Islamov went to the US and Great Britain for an internship. In 2003, he was awarded a Doctor of Sciences in Technical Sciences degree. In 1998–2003, he was also engaged in business. From 2003 to 2006, Islamov worked as a docent at the Kuzbass State Technical University. In 2006–2007, he headed the board of programs and investment policy of the administration of the Kemerovo region. In 2007, he was appointed deputy head of the Department of Economic Development of the Kemerovo Oblast. In September 2016, he was elected deputy of the 7th State Duma from the Kemerovo Oblast constituency. In 2021, he was re-elected for the 8th State Duma.

== Legislative activity ==
According to IStories, even though on average, the deputies of the 7th State Duma introduced around 55 bills during their term of office, Dmitry Islamov sent only three bills to the floor, two of them were adopted.

== Sanctions ==
He was sanctioned by the UK government in 2022 in relation to the Russo-Ukrainian War.
