= Roy Medvedev =

Russian political writer (1925–2026)

- Рой Медведев
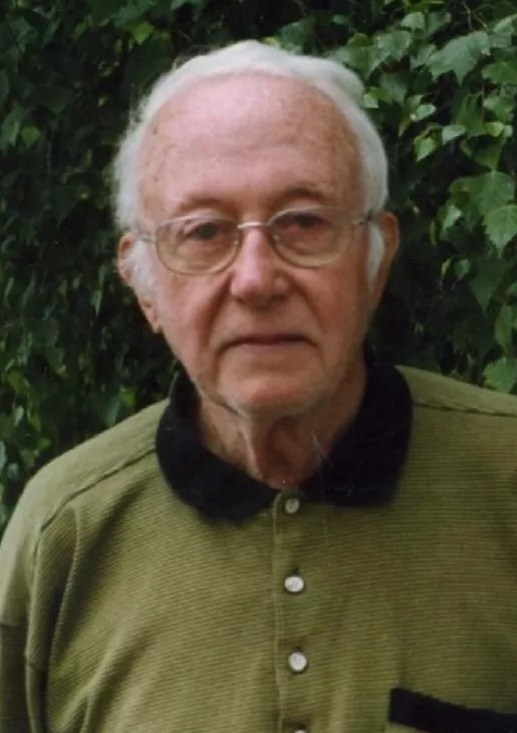
- Medvedev in 2005
- Born: Roy Aleksandrovich Medvedev; 14 November 1925; Tbilisi, Georgian SSR, Transcaucasian SFSR, Soviet Union
- Died: 13 February 2026 (aged 100); Moscow, Russia
- Citizenship: Soviet Union (1925–1991); Russia (1991–2026)
- Education: Saint Petersburg State University
- Known for: Human rights activism with participation in dissident movement in the Soviet Union
- Scientific career
- Fields: Russian studies, investigative journalism

Roy Aleksandrovich Medvedev (Russian: Рой Алекса́ндрович Медве́дев; 14 November 1925 – 13 February 2026) was a Russian politician and writer. He was the author of the dissident history of Stalinism, Let History Judge (К суду истории), first published in English in 1972.

== Life and career ==
Medvedev was born in Tbilisi, Georgian SSR, Transcaucasian SFSR, Soviet Union on 14 November 1925, into a Jewish family. He received his name in honour of the Indian communist of the 1920s, Manabendra Nath Roy (M. N. Roy), a member of the Executive Committee of the Comintern and one of the founders of the Communist Party of India. He had an identical twin brother, the biologist Zhores Medvedev, who died in 2018. Roy and Zhores Medvedev's father was Alexander Romanovich Medvedev (1899–1941), a Soviet military officer with the rank of commissar of a regiment; his mother was the cellist Yulia Isaakovna Reiman (1901–1961). Medvedev's father, Alexander Medvedev, served as a senior lecturer in the philosophy department of the Military-Political Academy in the 1930s. On 23 August 1938, he was arrested and accused of belonging to a Trotskyist organization and "smuggling Trotskyism" into textbooks he had compiled and edited. On 5 June 1939, he was sentenced to 8 years in a labor camp. He served his sentence in Kolyma, where he died on 8 February 1941.

From a Marxist viewpoint, Roy criticized former Soviet General Secretary Joseph Stalin and Stalinism in general during the Soviet era. In the early 1960s, Medvedev was engaged in samizdat publications. He was critical of the unscientific nature of Lysenkoism.

Medvedev was expelled from the Communist Party in 1969 after his book Let History Judge was published abroad. The book criticized Stalin and Stalinism at a time when official Soviet propagandists were trying to rehabilitate the former General Secretary. Let History Judge reflected the dissident thinking that emerged in the 1960s among Soviet intellectuals who sought a reformist version of socialism like Medvedev. Along with Andrei Sakharov and others, he announced his position in an open letter to the Soviet leadership in 1970. In a book co-authored with his twin brother, Zhores, A Question of Madness, Medvedev describes Zhores' involuntary commitment in the Kaluga Psychiatric Hospital (see Political abuse of psychiatry in the Soviet Union). Zhores, a dissident biologist, was questioned in the hospital about his involvement with samizdat, and his book The Rise and Fall of T.D. Lysenko. Zhores was exiled to Britain in the 1970s.

Medvedev rejoined the Communist Party in 1989, after Mikhail Gorbachev launched his perestroika and glasnost program of gradual political and economic reforms. He was elected to the Soviet Union's Congress of People's Deputies and was named as member of the Supreme Soviet, the permanent working body of the Congress. Following the collapse of the Soviet Union in 1991, Medvedev and dozens of other former communist deputies of the Soviet and Russian parliaments founded the Socialist Party of Working People, and became a co-chair of the party. In 2008, Medvedev wrote a biography of Vladimir Putin where he gave his activities as president a positive evaluation.

In May 2025, at the age of 99, he gave an interview to Moskovsky Komsomolets, in which he supported the policies of President Putin and declared:

"Personally, a leader like Putin suits me fine. I don’t know who will come after him. I like Mishustin too, but for all his merits, he lacks the charisma Putin has. People like Putin are rare; they are very hard to find."

Medvedev died on 13 February 2026, at the age of 100.

== Publications in English ==
Books

- Let History Judge: The Origin and Consequences of Stalinism, Alfred A. Knopf, New York, 1972 ISBN 0-394-44645-3
- On Socialist Democracy, Alfred A. Knopf, New York, 1975, ISBN 0-394-48960-8
- Problems in the Literary Biography of Mikhail Sholokhov, Cambridge University Press, 1977
- Khrushchev, Blackwell, Oxford, Doubleday, New York, 1983, ISBN 0-385-18387-9
- The October Revolution, Columbia University Press, New York, 1979, ISBN 0094629005
- All Stalin's Men, Blackwell, Oxford, 1984, ISBN 0-385-18388-7
- A Question Of Madness (with Zhores Medvedev). Alfred A. Knopf, New York. 1971 ISBN 0-394-47900-9 ISBN 0-14-003783-7
- Khrushchev: The Years in Power (with Zhores Medvedev). 198 pages. Columbia University Press, 1976, ISBN 0-231-03939-5
- On Soviet Dissent Columbia University Press, 1979, ISBN 0-231-04812-2
- Philip Mironov and the Russian Civil War (with Sergei Starikov), Alfred A. Knopf, 1978, ISBN 0-394-40681-8
- Leninism and Western Socialism Verso, 1981, ISBN 0-86091-739-8
- Nikolai Bukharin: The Last Years. 176 pages. W. W. Norton & Company, 1983, ISBN 0-393-30110-9
- China and the Superpowers. Basil Blackwell. Oxford, 1987, ISBN 0-631-13843-9
- Let History Judge: The Origins and Consequences of Stalinism (Revised and expanded edition), Columbia University Press, 1989, ISBN 0-231-06350-4
- Post-Soviet Russia: A Journey Through the Yeltsin Era (with George Shriver), 394 pages, Columbia University Press, 2002, ISBN 0-231-10607-6
- The Unknown Stalin (with Zhores Medvedev), The Overlook Press, 336 pages, 2004, ISBN 1-58567-502-4
- Stalin and the Short Course. [2004], 1000 Flowers Publishing, 53 pages, 2026. (Digital only)

Articles

- Sakharov, Andrei; Turchin, Valentin; Medvedev, Roy (6 June 1970). "The need for democratization". The Saturday Review: 26–27.
- Sakharov, Andrei; Turchin, Valentin; Medvedev, Roy (Summer 1970). "An open letter". Survey: 160–170.
- Medvedev, Roy (1974). "The Gulag Archipelago". Australian Left Review. 1 (45): 25–33.
- Medvedev, Roy (July 1974). "On Solzhenitsyn's book The Gulag Archipelago". Soviet Studies in Literature. 10 (3): 44–62. doi:10.2753/RSL1061-1975100344.
- Medvedev, Roy (January–February 1974). "Problems of democratization and détente". New Left Review. 1 (83): 25–33.
- Medvedev, Roy (1 September 1974). "What lies ahead for us?". New Left Review (87): 61.
- Medvedev, Roy (March 1979). "The future of Soviet dissent". Index on Censorship. 8 (2): 25–31. doi:10.1080/03064227908532898. S2CID 144007468.
- Medvedev, Roy (1 January 1984). "Andropov and the dissidents: the internal atmosphere under the new Soviet leadership". Dissent. 31 (1): 97–102.
- Medvedev, Roy; Vladimov, Georgi (May 1979). "Controversy: dissent among dissidents". Index on Censorship. 8 (3): 33–37. doi:10.1080/03064227908532924. S2CID 147185209.
- Medvedev, Roy (1 May 1980). "The Afghan crisis". New Left Review. 1 (121): 91.
- Medvedev, Roy; Medvedev, Zhores (1976). "Krushchev's secret speech". Australian Left Review. 1 (52): 34–37.
- Medvedev, Roy; Medvedev, Zhores (November–December 1981). "The USSR and the arms race". New Left Review. 1 (130).
- Medvedev, Roy; Medvedev, Zhores (1982). "A nuclear samizdat on Americas arms-race". The Nation. 234 (2): 38.
- Medvedev, Roy (1 September 1991). "Politics after the coup". New Left Review. 1 (189): 91.
- Medvedev, Roy (Fall 1992). "After the communist collapse: new political tendencies in Russia". Dissent. 39: 489–497.
- Medvedev, Roy (March 1995). "Russia today". Russian Politics and Law. 33 (2): 40–46. doi:10.2753/RUP1061-1940330240.
- Medvedev, Roy (March 1996). "Russians and Germans fifty years after World War II". Russian Politics and Law. 33 (2): 82–96. doi:10.2753/RUP1061-1940340282.
- Medvedev, Roy (May 1998). "Russia again at the crossroads". Sociological Research. 37 (3): 22–42. doi:10.2753/SOR1061-0154370322.
- Medvedev, Roy (May 1998). "A new class in Russian society". Russian Politics and Law. 36 (3): 45–66. doi:10.2753/RUP1061-1940360345.
- Medvedev, Roy (July 1999). "A long-term construction project for Russia". Russian Politics and Law. 37 (4): 5–48. doi:10.2753/RUP1061-194037045.
- Medvedev, Roy (July 2000). "Boris Yeltsin resigns". Russian Politics and Law. 38 (4): 82–88. doi:10.2753/RUP1061-1940380482. S2CID 144439858.
- Medvedev, Roy (12 July 2006). "History and myths". Russia in Global Affairs. Archived from the original on 7 February 2016.
- Medvedev, Roy (June 2007). "The Russian language throughout the Commonwealth of Independent States: toward a statement of the problem". Russian Politics and Law. 45 (3): 5–30. doi:10.2753/RUP1061-1940450301. S2CID 143887460.
- Medvedev, Roy (July–September 2007). "A splinted Ukraine" (PDF). Russia in Global Affairs. 5 (3): 194–213. Archived from the original (PDF) on 19 January 2016.

== Sources ==
- Inside Russia Today. David K. Shipler.
