= Olga Li =

Russian politician (born 1986)

Personal details
- Born: 22 July 1986 Abay, Kazakhstan

Olga Sergeyevna Li (Russian: Ольга Сергеевна Ли; born 22 July 1986) is a Russian politician and journalist. Since 2011, she has been a representative in the Kursk regional legislative.

She prepares to run for parliament as a member of the opposition. However, Russian authorities try to charge her with "degrading the dignity" of state officials and endangering Russia's statehood, after she has criticized the Russian president Vladimir Putin in her video named "An Appeal to Putin". Among others, Li accuses him of allowing "criminal conspiracy" at the top of Russian government or the "destruction of the rule of law". If she is convicted, she could face up to two years in prison.

Li has also criticized some of the local authorities, including the deputy chairman of the regional assembly, Viktor Karamyshev, from Putin's United Russia party.

She is a single mother of two daughters.
