= Socialist Workers' Party (Russia) =

Russian leftist party (1991–2001)

Socialist Workers' Party Социалистическая партия трудящихся
- Abbreviation: SPT (English); СПТ (Russian)
- Leader: Alexander Maltsev; Lyudmila Vartazarova
- Founders: Roy Medvedev; Anatoly Denisov; Ivan Rybkin; Evgeny Krasnitsky; Vitaly Sevastyanov
- Founded: 1 October 1991
- Registered: 21 November 1991
- Dissolved: 2001
- Split from: CPSU
- Headquarters: 8/7th building, Zlatoustinsky Lane, Moscow, Russia. 101000
- Newspaper: Left newspaper
- Membership (1992): 70,000
- Ideology: Democratic socialism Social democracy Neocommunism
- Political position: Centre-left to left-wing
- Colours: Red
- Slogan: «Socialism, Democracy, Progress» (Russian: "Социализм, демократия, прогресс»)

The Socialist Workers' Party (SPT; Russian: Социалистическая партия трудящихся; СПТ; Sotsialisticheskaya partiya trudyashchikhsya, SPT), active from 1991 through 2001), was an all-Russian public organization; party of the left social democratic orientation. The SPT Program adopted at the 1st Congress states that the party "defends the interests of employees of mental and physical labor, collective and individual producers, whose source of income is personal labor and property."

== Statutes and program ==
The statutory and program documents, adopted at the founding conference and the 1st congress of the party, defined the goal of the party's statutory activities as “promoting a peaceful, constitutional withdrawal of Russian society from a deep economic, political and spiritual crisis, the formation, on the basis of radical reforms, of a legal democratic state, a diversified economy, civil society capable of providing real guarantees of rights and freedoms, a high level of well-being of citizens, social protection of the poor. " At the same time, among the most important political tasks, the SPT has put "the restoration at all levels and the strengthening of a strong Soviet power."

In the economic sphere, the party advocated "equality of all forms of ownership while maintaining the priority of its collective forms", for "maintaining a strong state sector of the economy" and "state regulation of general conditions of production and consumption."

The resolution of these tasks was supposed, according to the Charter, through "participation in the organization and activities of state authorities and local self-government, including by providing assistance to the deputies elected with the support of the SPT in the implementation of the will and orders of voters, the political goals of the party."

== History ==
On October 1, 1991, People's Deputies of the USSR Roy Medvedev and Anatoly Denisov, People's Deputies of the RSFSR Ivan Rybkin and Vitaly Sevastyanov, Deputy of the Leningrad Council Evgeny Krasnitsky (later a deputy of the State Duma of the Russian Federation of the first convocation) and others called for the creation of a “new Russian party of leftist forces of socialist orientation” on the platform of the latest draft of the CPSU Program “Socialism, Democracy, Progress”.

The founding conference of the Socialist Workers' Party (SPT) was held on October 26, 1991 in the club of the Moscow plant "Compressor". The conference was opened by Roy Medvedev, Anatoly Denisov made a political report.

Representatives of the organizing committees of the Russian Party of Communists and the Union of Communists, as well as a delegation of the Communist Initiative Movement (DKI), who proposed to call the party the "Communist Party of Workers" were invited to the congress, but this proposal was not accepted. After that, the representatives of the DKI left their delegate mandates and left the congress, the representatives of the Union of Communists also left the congress, only the representatives of the organizing committee of the Russian Party of Communists at first stated that they were dissatisfied with the name of the party and the program documents, but still remained in the SPT and formed in it "platform of communist workers", but in the end they stopped any cooperation with the SPT and held their own constituent congress.

The Constituent Conference elected the organizing committee of the Constituent Congress of 63 people, chaired by Ivan Rybkin. At a meeting of the organizing committee, it was announced that the spiritual leader of the party is Roy Medvedev, and the official leaders of the SPT will be elected at the congress.

On November 21, 1991, the Socialist Party of Workers was registered by the Ministry of Justice of the RSFSR (reg. No. 418).

== Party position through the eyes of its leaders ==
=== Anatoly Alekseevich Denisov ===
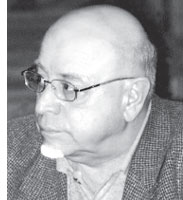
Анатолий Алексеевич Денисов (1934—2010)

“Between Communists and Social Democrats” was the title of an interview given in 1995 to the newspaper “Sankt-Peterburgskie Vedomosti” by one of the co-founders of the SPT, People's Deputy of the USSR, Anatoly Alekseevich Denisov. In particular, this prominent scientist from the Leningrad Polytechn, known throughout the country for broadcasting the sessions of the Congress of People's Deputies, said:

«…It is not without reason that we consider ourselves a party for the social protection of workers. That is, on the one hand, we oppose ourselves to orthodox communists, who are not alien to dictatorial habits. On the other hand, to radical liberals, for whom absolute freedom is above all at the expense of social justice».

The journalist Aleksandr Rabkovsky, who interviewed, noted that "according to the leaders of the Union of Telecommunications, the desire to cooperate with their party, to speak with it at the upcoming parliamentary elections, was expressed by many politicians - from the chairman of the Social Democracy Party A. Yakovlev to the head of the Russian National Cathedral A. Sterligov" ... However, the journalist summed up, "SPT, striving to preserve the purity and refinement of its own program, is distinguished by enviable discrimination in the formation of various blocs and alliances."

== Books ==
- A. A. Denisov. Through the eyes of a People's Deputy of the USSR. — SPb.: Publishing house of Polytechnic university, 2006. — 660 pages
