= Alexander Bryksin =

Russian politician

- Александр Брыксин
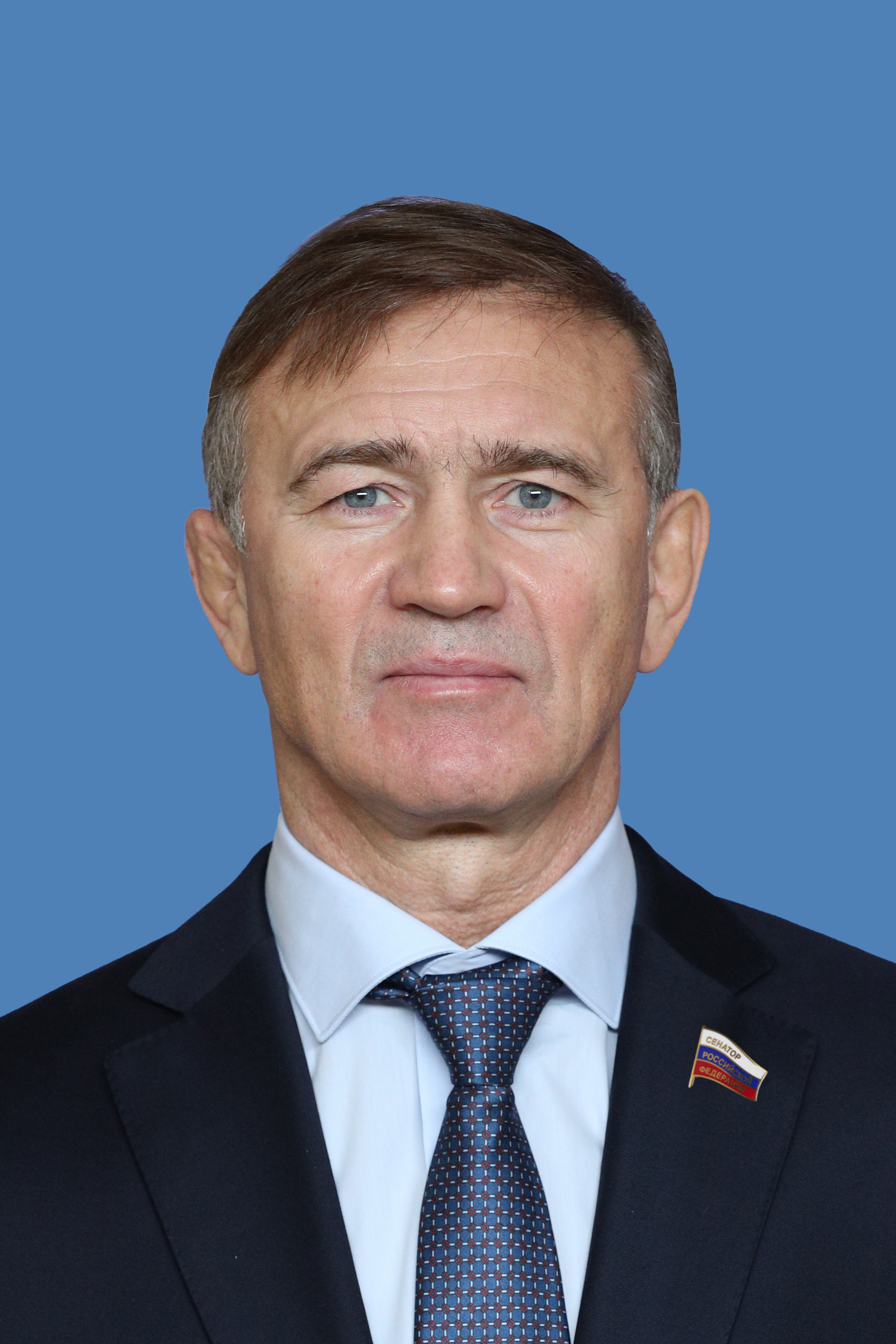

Senator from Kursk Oblast
- Incumbent
- Assumed office 7 October 2021
- Preceded by: Valery Ryazansky

Personal details
- Born: Alexander Bryksin; 20 January 1967 (age 59) Kemerovo, Russian Soviet Federative Socialist Republic, Soviet Union
- Party: United Russia
- Education: Kemerovo Technological Institute of Food Industry, KemSU

Alexander Yuryevich Bryksin (Russian: Александр Юрьевич Брыксин; born 20 January 1967) is a Russian politician serving as a senator from Kursk Oblast since 7 October 2021.

== Career ==
Alexander Bryksin was born on 20 January 1967 in Kemerovo. In 1996, he graduated from the Kemerovo Technological Institute of Food Industry. From 2007 to 2010, he was the Vice President of the Russian International Bank (Moscow). From 2011 to 2016, he served as deputy of the State Duma of the 5th and 6th convocations. On 7 October 2021, he was appointed the senator from Kursk Oblast.

== Sanctions ==
Alexander Bryksin is under personal sanctions introduced by the European Union, the United Kingdom, the USA, Canada, Switzerland, Australia, Ukraine, New Zealand, for ratifying the decisions of the "Treaty of Friendship, Cooperation and Mutual Assistance between the Russian Federation and the Donetsk People's Republic and between the Russian Federation and the Luhansk People's Republic" and providing political and economic support for Russia's annexation of Ukrainian territories.
