= Yekaterina Kharchenko =

Russian politician

- Екатерина Харченко
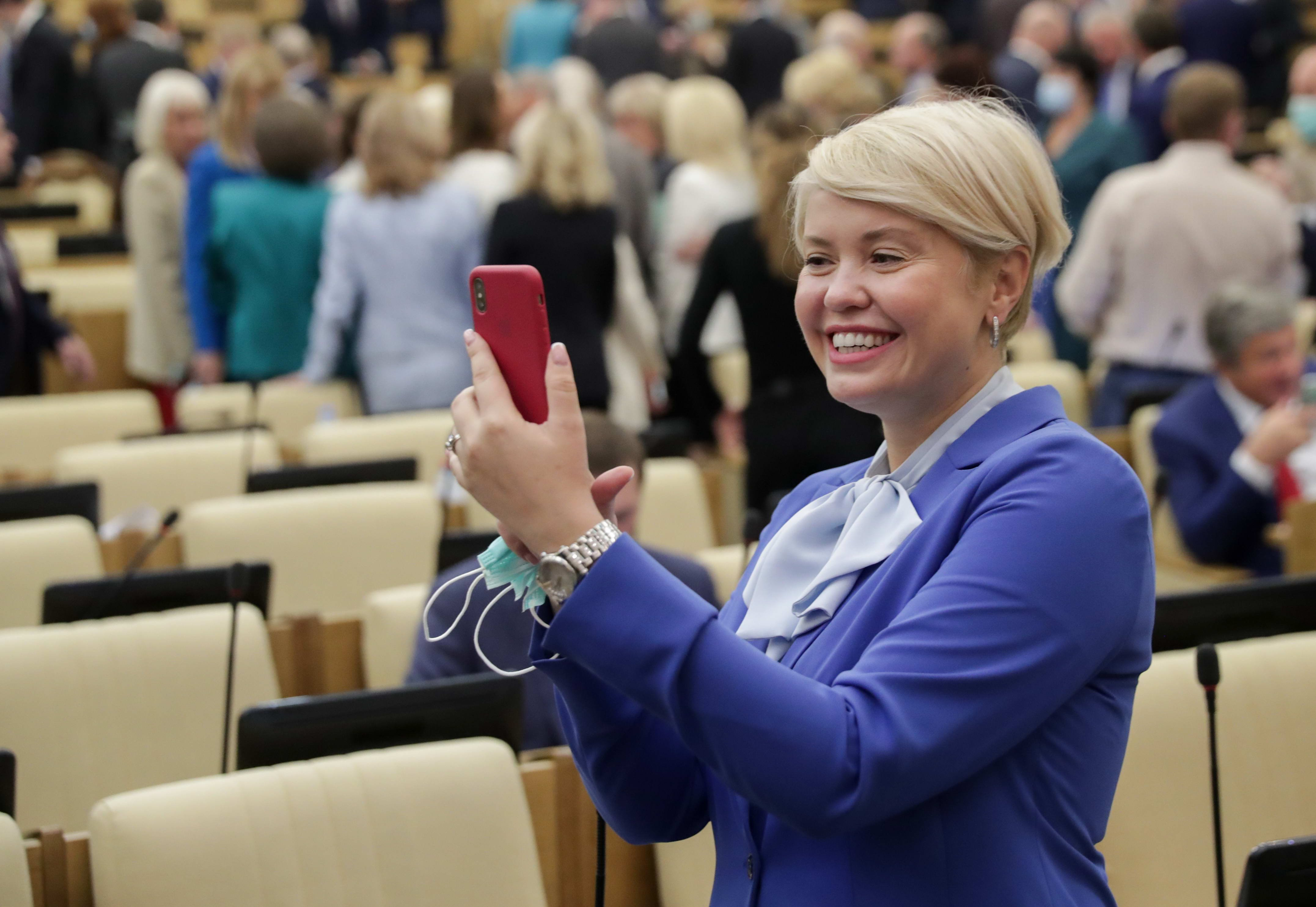
- official portrait, circa 2021

Member of the State Duma for Kursk Oblast
- Incumbent
- Assumed office 12 October 2021
- Preceded by: Tatyana Voronina
- Constituency: Kursk (No. 109)

Personal details
- Born: 11 August 1977 (age 49) Kursk, RSFSR, USSR
- Party: United Russia
- Education: Kursk Politechnical Institute

Yekaterina Vladimirovna Kharchenko (Russian: Екатерина Владимировна Харченко; born August 11, 1977, Kursk) is a Russian political figure and deputy of the 8th State Duma. In 2021, she was granted a Doctor of Sciences in Economics degree

She started her career at the Kursk Politechnical Institute as a graduate student, docent, and, later, a senior lecturer. She was also a dean of the Faculty of Economics and Management. From 2016 to 2019, she headed the Committee on Education and Science of the Kursk region. In 2019, she was appointed Deputy Governor of the Kursk region on internal affairs. In 2020–2021, she headed the Kursk State Agricultural Academy. She left the post in September 2021 to become a deputy of the 8th State Duma.

== Sanctions ==
She was sanctioned by the UK government in 2022 in relation to the Russo-Ukrainian War.
