= Vasily Piskaryov =

Russian politician

- Василий Пискарёв
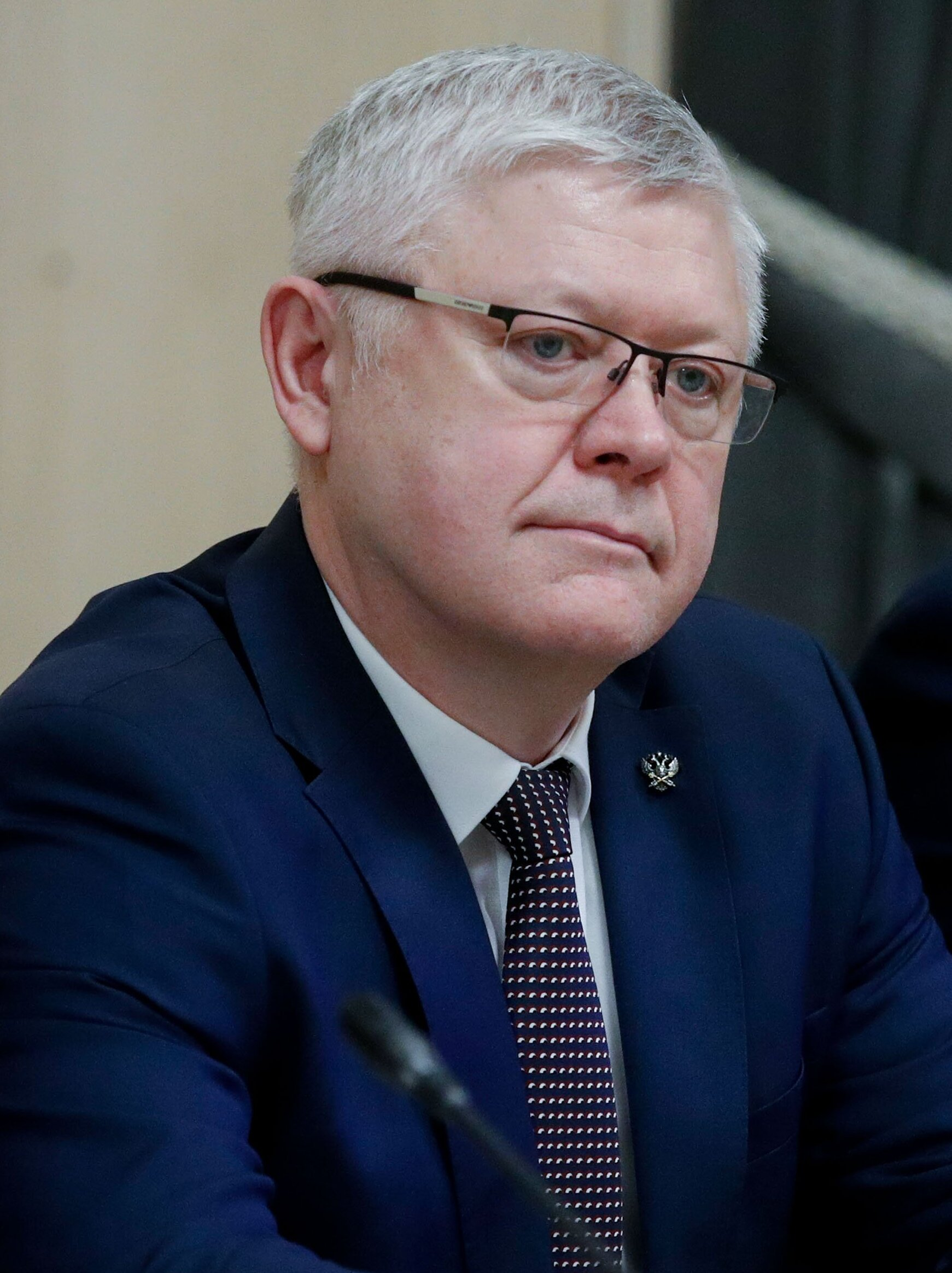

Chairman of the State Duma committee on Security and Anti-Corruption
- Incumbent
- Assumed office 5 October 2016
- Preceded by: Irina Yarovaya

Deputy of the State Duma Russia
- Incumbent
- Assumed office 18 September 2016
- Constituency: Mordovia

Deputy head of the Investigative Committee Russia
- In office 13 March 2012 – 5 October 2016
- Head: Alexander Bastrykin

Personal details
- Born: November 8, 1963 (age 62) Shilovka, Kastorensky District, Kursk Oblast, RSFSR, Soviet Union
- Party: United Russia
- Education: Sverdlovsk Law Institute

Military service
- Rank: State Councillor of Justice, 1st class

Vasily Ivanovich Piskaryov (Russian: Василий Иванович Пискарёв) is a Russian politician who currently serves as the chairman of the State Duma committee on Security and Anti-Corruption since 5 October 2016.

Piskaryov is a deputy for the United Russia party in the State Duma of the Russian Federation. He is the head of the committee on Safety and Anti-Corruption.

Following the Russian invasion of Ukraine, Piskaryov was sanctioned by the European Union on 25 February 2022 after Russia annexed the Ukrainian oblasts of Donetsk and Luhansk. He was subsequently additionally sanctioned by the governments of the United Kingdom on 11 March, the United States on 30 September, and Canada on 23 February 2023.
