= Central Black Earth Oblast =

1928–1934 unit of Russia

Coordinates: 51°40′N 39°13′E

Central-Chernozem Oblast Центрально-Чернозёмная область
- Oblast of the Russian SFSR
- 1928–1934
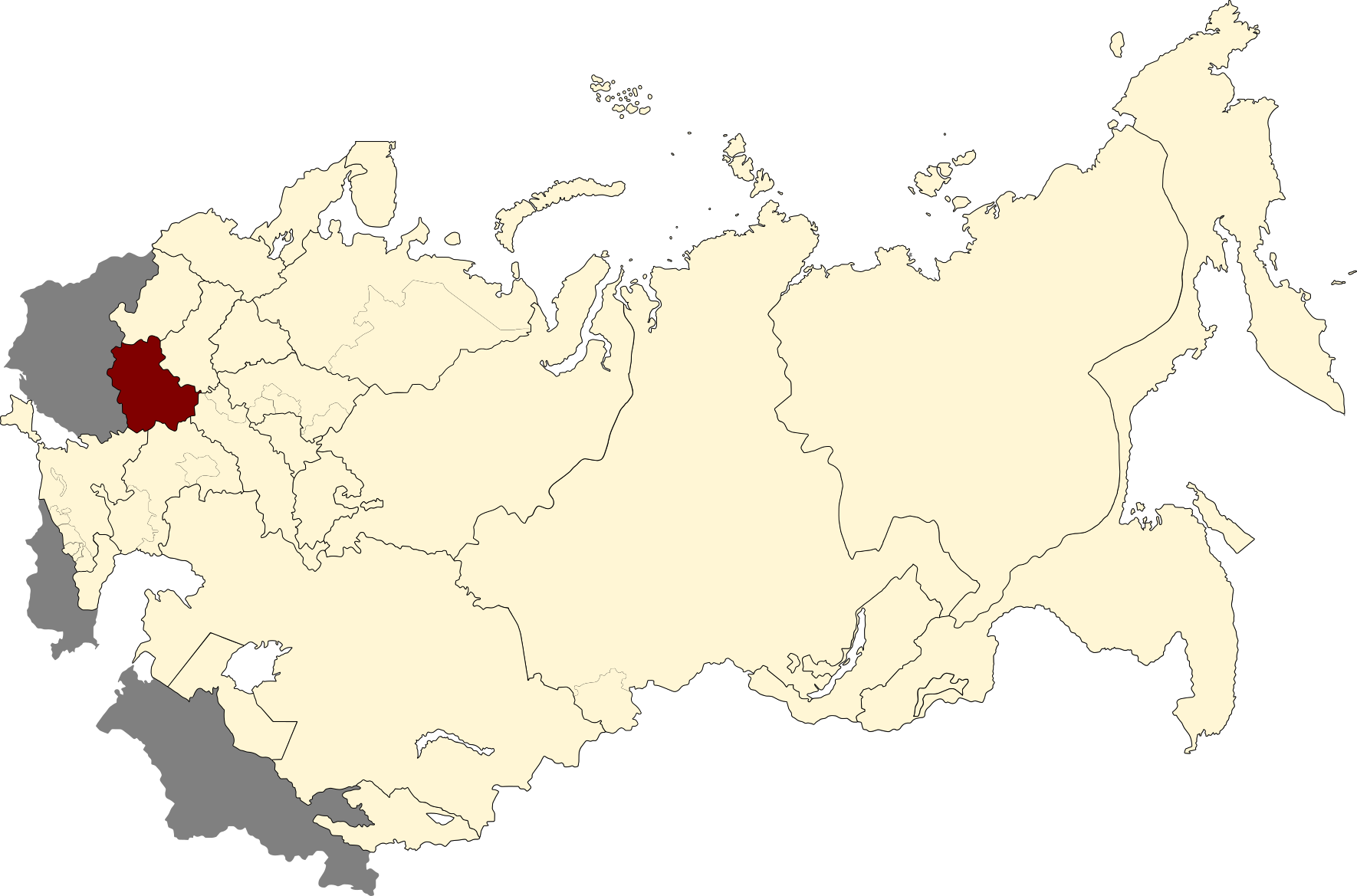
- Location in the Russian SFSR
- Capital: Voronezh
- History
  - Established: May 14 1928
  - Disestablished: June 13 1934
- Political subdivisions: 11 okrugs
Preceded by
Voronezh Governorate
Succeeded by
Voronezh Oblast
Oryol Oblast
Kursk Oblast
Belgorod Oblast
Lipetsk Oblast
Tambov Oblast

Central-Chernozem Oblast (Russian: Центрально-Чернозёмная область, romanized: Tsentral'no-Chernozyomnaya oblast', lit. 'Central-Black soil Oblast') was an administrative-territorial unit (oblast) of the Russian SFSR from 1928 to 1934. Its seat was in the city of Voronezh. The oblast was located in the center of European Russia, and its territory is currently divided between Voronezh, Oryol, Kursk, Belgorod, Lipetsk, and Tambov Oblasts, as well as a minor part of Penza Oblast. The geographical territory of the former oblast does not currently have any administrative significance, but is often referred to as the Central Black Earth Region.

The most important authority in the oblast was the first secretary of the CPSU Oblast Committee. For the whole existence of the oblast, the first secretary was Iosif Vareikis.

== History ==
The oblast was established on May 14, 1928 by the All-Russian Central Executive Committee. The territory of the krai was formed from four governorates, Voronezh, Kursk, Oryol, and Tambov Governorates.

On July 16, 1928, the All-Russian Central Executive Committee issued a decree splitting Central Black Earth Oblast into eleven administrative districts (okrugs)

- Belgorod Okrug (with the seat located in Belgorod);
- Borisoglebsk Okrug (Borisoglebsk);
- Kozlov Okrug (Kozlov);
- Kursk Okrug (Kursk);
- Lgov Okrug (Lgov);
- Oryol Okrug (Oryol);
- Ostrogozhsk Okrug (Ostrogozhsk);
- Rossosh Okrug (Rossosh);
- Tambov Okrug (Tambov);
- Voronezh Okrug (Voronezh);
- Yelets Okrug (Yelets).

Before the oblast was established, the constituent governorates used the old division inherited from the Russian Empire (uyezds). On July 30, 1928 the division of the oblast into districts was established.

The following districts have been established,

- In Belgorod Okrug: Belgorodsky, Belovsky, Bolshetroitsky, Borisovsky, Grayvoronsky, Ivnyansky, Korochansky, Krasnoyaruzhsky, Prokhorovsky, Rakityansky, Skorodnyansky, Shebekinsky, Tomarovsky, and Veselo-Lopansky.
- In Borisoglebsk Okrug: Aleshkovsky, Arkhangelsky, Borisoglebsko-Prigorodny, Dobrinsky, Mordovsky, Novokhopyorsky, Peskovsky, Rusanovsky, Shchuchensky, Talovsky, Tokaryovsky, Verkhne-Karachansky, Yelan-Kolenovsky, and Zherdevsky.
- In Kozlov Okrug: Astapovsky, Beryozovsky, Dankovsky, Dobrovsky, Dryazginsky, Glazkovsky, Gryazinsky, Izberdeevsky, Khvorostyansky, Kozlovsky, Lamsky, Nikiforovsky, Ranenburgsky, Seslavinsky, Shekhmansky, Sosnovsky, Staroyuryevsky, Surensky, and Troyekurovsky.
- In Kursk Okrug: Besedinsky, Cheremisinovsky, Fatezhsky, Kolpnyansky, Kshensky, Kursky, Leninsky, Medvensky, Oboyansky, Ponyrovsky, Shchigrovsky, Solntsevsky, Svobodinsky, and Timskoy.
- In Lgov Okrug: Bolshesoldatsky, Dmitriyevsky, Glushkovsky, Ivaninsky, Khomutovsky, Konyshyovsky, Korenevsky, Lgovsky, Mikhaylovsky, Rylsky, and Sudzhansky.
- In Oryol Okrug: Bolkhovsky, Dmitrovsky, Donskoy, Glodnevsky, Korsakovsky, Kromskoy, Maloarkhangelsky, Mokhovskoy, Mtsensky, Novosilsky, Orlovsky, Sverdlovsky, Soskovsky, Trosnyansky, Uzkinsky, Uritsky, and Verkhovskoy.
- In Ostrogozhsk Okrug: Alexeyevsky, Budyonnovsky, Chernyansky, Davydovsky, Kamensky, Korotoyaksky, Liskinsky, Nikitovsky, Novooskolsky, Ostrogozhsky, Repyovsky, Urazovsky, Valuysky, Veliko-Mikhaylovsky, Veydelevsky, and Volokonovsky.
- In Rossosh Okrug: Bogucharsky, Buturlinovsky, Kalacheyevsky, Kantemirovsky, Losevsky, Mikhaylovsky, Novokalitvyansky, Olkhovatsky, Pavlovsky, Petropavlovsky, Podgorensky, Rovensky, Rossoshansky, Verkhnemamonsky, Vorobyovsky, and Vorontsovsky.
- In Tambov Okrug: Algasovsky, Bondarsky, Gromovsky, Inzhavinsky, Kirsanovsky, Morshansky, Muchkapsky, Peresypkinsky, Pichayevsky, Pokrovo-Marfinsky, Rakshinsky, Rasskazovsky, Rzhaksinsky, Sampursky, Uvarovsky, and Zemetchinsky.
- In Voronezh Okrug: Anninsky, Berezovsky, Bobrovo-Dvorsky, Bobrovsky, Gorshechensky, Gremyachensky, Kastorensky, Khlevensky, Levorossoshansky, Nizhnedevitsky, Paninsky, Rozhdestvenskokhavsky, Starooskolsky, Shatalovsky, Usmansky, Verkhnekhavsky, Yastrebovsky, Yendovishchensky, and Zemlyansky.
- In Yelets Okrug: Bolshe-Polyansky, Borinsko-Zavodskoy, Dolgorukovsky, Dolzhansky, Izmalkovsky, Krasninsky, Lebedyansky, Lipetsky, Livensky, Russko-Brodsky, Shilovsky, Stanovlyansky, Studenetsky, Terbunsky, Trubetchinsky, Volnovsky, Volovsky, Volynsky, Yeletsky, and Zadonsky.

In 1929, the city of Voronezh was made a special administrative unit subordinate to the oblast, and Voronezh Okrug was abolished and split into Stary Oskol Okrug and Usman Okrug. On July 23, 1930 the okrugs were abolished, and the districts were made directly subordinate to the oblast authorities. In particular, the oblast had two Beryozovsky Districts. The number of districts was considerably reduced on several occasions. On April 7, 1932 the city of Lipetsk was made a separate administrative unit.

On June 13, 1934, by the Decree of All-Russian Central Executive Committee the oblast was abolished. Its territory was divided between newly established Voronezh Oblast and Kursk Oblast.
