= Seimsky constituency =

Constituency of the State Duma of the Russian Federation

Seimsky single-member constituency
- Constituency of the Russian State Duma
- Deputy: Aleksey Zolotaryov; United Russia
- Federal subject: Kursk Oblast
- Districts: Belovsky, Bolshesoldatsky, Cheremisinovsky, Glushkovsky, Gorshechensky, Kastorensky, Korenevsky, Kursk (Zheleznodorozhny, Seimsky), Kursky (Klyukvinsky, Lebyazhensky, Novoposelenovsky, Poleskoy, Ryshkovsky, Shumakovsky, Voroshnevsky), Manturovsky, Medvensky, Oboyansky, Oktyabrsky, Pristensky, Rylsky, Shchigrovsky, Shchigry, Solntsevsky, Sovetsky, Sudzhansky, Timsky
- Voters: 416,071 (2026)

The Seimsky constituency (No.111 (Note: No.110 in 2016–2026)) is a Russian legislative constituency in Kursk Oblast. The constituency covers part of Kursk, southern and eastern Kursk Oblast.

The constituency has been represented since 2026 by United Russia deputy Aleksey Zolotaryov, former Member of Kursk Oblast Duma, agricultural executive and nephew of former State Duma member Aleksey Zolotaryov, who won the open seat, succeeding two-term United Russia incumbent Olga Germanova.

== Boundaries ==
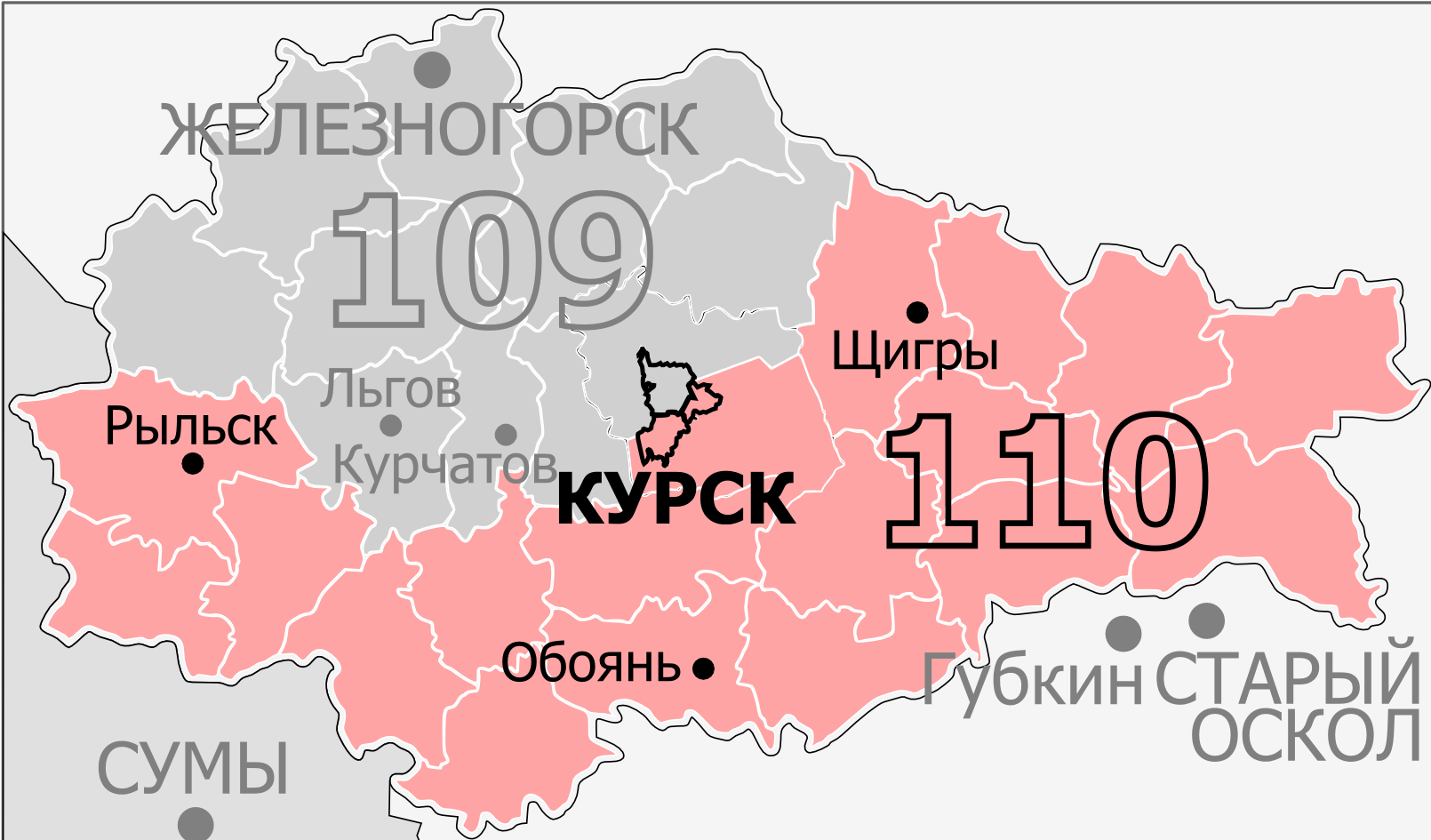
Constituency boundaries from 2016 to 2026

2016–2026: Belovsky District, Bolshesoldatsky District, Cheremisinovsky District, Glushkovsky District, Gorshechensky District, Kastorensky District, Korenevsky District, Kursk (Zheleznodorozhny, Seimsky), Kursky District (Besedinsky, Klyukvinsky, Lebyazhensky, Novoposelenovsky, Poleskoy, Ryshkovsky, Shumakovsky, Voroshnevsky), Manturovsky District, Medvensky District, Oboyansky District, Pristensky District, Rylsky District, Shchigrovsky District, Shchigry, Solntsevsky District, Sovetsky District, Sudzhansky District, Timsky District
The constituency was created for the 2016 election, taking most of former Kursk constituency, including part of Kursk, as well as southern part of Lgov constituency.

2026–present: Belovsky District, Bolshesoldatsky District, Cheremisinovsky District, Glushkovsky District, Gorshechensky District, Kastorensky District, Korenevsky District, Kursk (Zheleznodorozhny, Seimsky), Kursky District (Klyukvinsky, Lebyazhensky, Novoposelenovsky, Poleskoy, Ryshkovsky, Shumakovsky, Voroshnevsky), Manturovsky District, Medvensky District, Oboyansky District, Oktyabrsky District, Pristensky District, Rylsky District, Shchigrovsky District, Shchigry, Solntsevsky District, Sovetsky District, Sudzhansky District, Timsky District
After 2025 redistricting the constituency saw minor changes, swapping Kursk eastern suburbs for Oktyabrsky District with Kursk constituency.

== Members elected ==
Election	Member	Party
2016	Viktor Karamyshev (Note: elected Mayor of Kursk in June 2019)	United Russia
2020	Aleksey Zolotaryov	United Russia
2021	Olga Germanova	United Russia
2026	Aleksey Zolotaryov	United Russia

== Election results ==
=== 2016 ===
Summary of the 18 September 2016 Russian legislative election in the Seimsky constituency
Candidate	Party	Votes	%
Viktor Karamyshev	United Russia	114,855	52.03%
Aleksandr Rutskoy	Patriots of Russia	38,698	17.03%
Maksim Budanov	Communist Party	16,198	7.34%
Anna Raspolova	Liberal Democratic Party	14,516	6.58%
Anatoly Kurakin	A Just Russia	7,986	3.62%
Anton Udovenko	Communists of Russia	4,487	2.03%
Yury Budkov	Independent	4,458	2.02%
Valery Akinshin	Rodina	2,924	1.32%
Tatyana Chernikova	The Greens	2,907	1.32%
Yekaterina Vdovina	Civic Platform	2,502	1.13%
Aleksandr Fedulov	Party of Growth	1,933	0.88%
Aleksey Shestavin	Yabloko	1,559	0.71%
Total		220,738	100%

=== 2020 ===
Summary of the 13 September 2020 by-election in the Seimsky constituency
Candidate	Party	Votes	%
Aleksey Zolotaryov	United Russia	108,523	60.08%
Aleksey Bobovnikov	Communist Party	25,650	14.20%
Anatoly Kurakin	A Just Russia	15,727	8.71%
Aleksey Tomanov	Liberal Democratic Party	14,508	8.03%
Artyom Vakarev	Communists of Russia	11,388	6.30%
Total		180,626	100%

=== 2021 ===
Summary of the 17-19 September 2021 Russian legislative election in the Seimsky constituency
Candidate	Party	Votes	%
Olga Germanova	United Russia	91,945	42.83%
Aleksey Bobovnikov	Communist Party	42,616	19.85%
Anastasia Artemova	New People	20,086	9.36%
Igor Filippovsky	A Just Russia — For Truth	16,419	7.65%
Aleksey Tomanov	Liberal Democratic Party	15,252	7.10%
Yelena Timofeyeva	Party of Pensioners	14,345	6.68%
Vladimir Bizyayev	Yabloko	3,476	1.62%
Vladimir Shalaginov	Party of Growth	2,017	0.94%
Total		214,671	100%

=== 2026 ===
Summary of the 18-20 September 2026 Russian legislative election in the Seimsky constituency
Candidate	Party	Votes	%
Aleksey Zolotaryov	United Russia	118,406	51.84%
Aleksey Bobovnikov	Communist Party	28,129	12.31%
Aleksey Tomanov	Liberal Democratic Party	18,721	8.20%
Irina Antsiferova	Party of Pensioners	18,457	8.08%
Maksim Sysoyev	New People	13,730	6.01%
Aleksandr Novikov	Yabloko	11,702	5.12%
Anastasia Mitrofanova-Blinkina	A Just Russia	11,240	4.92%
Total		228,420	100%
