= Administrative divisions of Kursk Oblast =

Kursk Oblast Russia
- Administrative center: Kursk

Administrative structure (as of 2011)
- Districts: 28
- Cities/towns: 10
- Urban-type settlements: 22
- Selsovets: 478

Municipal structure (as of 2002)
- Rural settlements: 2,771 (inhabited); 49 (uninhabited)

Kurst Oblast is a federal subject of Russia.

== Administrative and municipal divisions ==
- Cities and towns under the oblast's jurisdiction:
  - Kursk (Курск) (administrative center)
    - city okrugs:
      - Seymsky (Сеймский)
      - Tsentralny (Центральный)
      - Zheleznodorozhny (Железнодорожный)
  - Kurchatov (Курчатов)
  - Lgov (Льгов)
  - Shchigry (Щигры)
  - Zheleznogorsk (Железногорск)
- Districts:
  - Belovsky (Беловский)
    - with 18 selsovets under the district's jurisdiction.
  - Bolshesoldatsky (Большесолдатский)
    - with 12 selsovets under the district's jurisdiction.
  - Cheremisinovsky (Черемисиновский)
    - Urban-type settlements under the district's jurisdiction:
      - Cheremisinovo (Черемисиново)
    - with 12 selsovets under the district's jurisdiction.
  - Dmitriyevsky (Дмитриевский)
    - Towns under the district's jurisdiction:
      - Dmitriyev (Дмитриев)
    - with 19 selsovets under the district's jurisdiction.
  - Fatezhsky (Фатежский)
    - Towns under the district's jurisdiction:
      - Fatezh (Фатеж)
    - with 21 selsovets under the district's jurisdiction.
  - Glushkovsky (Глушковский)
    - Urban-type settlements under the district's jurisdiction:
      - Glushkovo (Глушково)
      - Tyotkino (Тёткино)
    - with 14 selsovets under the district's jurisdiction.
  - Gorshechensky (Горшеченский)
    - Urban-type settlements under the district's jurisdiction:
      - Gorshechnoye (Горшечное)
    - with 15 selsovets under the district's jurisdiction.
  - Kastorensky (Касторенский)
    - Urban-type settlements under the district's jurisdiction:
      - Kastornoye (Касторное)
      - Novokastornoye (Новокасторное)
      - Olymsky (Олымский)
    - with 21 selsovets under the district's jurisdiction.
  - Khomutovsky (Хомутовский)
    - Urban-type settlements under the district's jurisdiction:
      - Khomutovka (Хомутовка)
    - with 20 selsovets under the district's jurisdiction.
  - Konyshyovsky (Конышёвский)
    - Urban-type settlements under the district's jurisdiction:
      - Konyshyovka (Конышёвка)
    - with 18 selsovets under the district's jurisdiction.
  - Korenevsky (Кореневский)
    - Urban-type settlements under the district's jurisdiction:
      - Korenevo (Коренево)
    - with 16 selsovets under the district's jurisdiction.
  - Kurchatovsky (Курчатовский)
    - Urban-type settlements under the district's jurisdiction:
      - Imeni Karla Libknekhta (Имени Карла Либкнехта)
      - Ivanino (Иванино)
    - with 10 selsovets under the district's jurisdiction.
  - Kursky (Курский)
    - with 21 selsovets under the district's jurisdiction.
  - Lgovsky (Льговский)
    - with 17 selsovets under the district's jurisdiction.
  - Manturovsky (Мантуровский)
    - with 19 selsovets under the district's jurisdiction.
  - Medvensky (Медвенский)
    - Urban-type settlements under the district's jurisdiction:
      - Medvenka (Медвенка)
    - with 15 selsovets under the district's jurisdiction.
  - Oboyansky (Обоянский)
    - Towns under the district's jurisdiction:
      - Oboyan (Обоянь)
    - with 19 selsovets under the district's jurisdiction.
  - Oktyabrsky (Октябрьский)
    - Urban-type settlements under the district's jurisdiction:
      - Pryamitsyno (Прямицыно)
    - with 10 selsovets under the district's jurisdiction.
  - Ponyrovsky (Поныровский)
    - Urban-type settlements under the district's jurisdiction:
      - Ponyri (Поныри)
    - with 13 selsovets under the district's jurisdiction.
  - Pristensky (Пристенский)
    - Urban-type settlements under the district's jurisdiction:
      - Kirovsky (Кировский)
      - Pristen (Пристень)
    - with 18 selsovets under the district's jurisdiction.
  - Rylsky (Рыльский)
    - Towns under the district's jurisdiction:
      - Rylsk (Рыльск)
    - with 27 selsovets under the district's jurisdiction.
  - Shchigrovsky (Щигровский)
    - with 18 selsovets under the district's jurisdiction.
  - Solntsevsky (Солнцевский)
    - Urban-type settlements under the district's jurisdiction:
      - Solntsevo (Солнцево)
    - with 16 selsovets under the district's jurisdiction.
  - Sovetsky (Советский)
    - Urban-type settlements under the district's jurisdiction:
      - Kshensky (Кшенский)
    - with 18 selsovets under the district's jurisdiction.
  - Sudzhansky (Суджанский)
    - Towns under the district's jurisdiction:
      - Sudzha (Суджа)
    - with 21 selsovets under the district's jurisdiction.
  - Timsky (Тимский)
    - Urban-type settlements under the district's jurisdiction:
      - Tim (Тим)
    - with 13 selsovets under the district's jurisdiction.
  - Zheleznogorsky (Железногорский)
    - Urban-type settlements under the district's jurisdiction:
      - Magnitny (Магнитный)
    - with 18 selsovets under the district's jurisdiction.
  - Zolotukhinsky (Золотухинский)
    - Urban-type settlements under the district's jurisdiction:
      - Zolotukhino (Золотухино)
    - with 19 selsovets under the district's jurisdiction.
