= Lgov constituency =

Former Russian legislative constituency

Lgov single-member constituency
- Constituency of the Russian State Duma

- Constituency boundaries from 1993 to 2007
- Deputy: None
- Federal subject: Kursk Oblast
- Districts: Belovsky, Bolshesoldatsky, Dmitriyevsky, Fatezhsky, Glushkovsky, Khomutovsky, Konyshyovsky, Korenevsky, Kurchatov, Kurchatovsky, Lgovsky, Medvensky, Oboyansky, Oktyabrsky, Ponyrovsky, Pristensky, Rylsky, Sudzhansky, Zheleznogorsk, Zheleznogorsky, Zolotukhinsky
- Voters: 517,696 (2003)

The Lgov constituency (No.98 (Note: No.99 in 1993-1995, No.97 in 1995-2003)) was a Russian legislative constituency in Kursk Oblast in 1993–2007. It covered western and central Kursk Oblast. The seat was last occupied by United Russia deputy Aleksey Volkov, militsiya major general and former Kursk Oblast MVD Division chief, who defeated one-term incumbent State Duma member Aleksandr Chetverikov in the 2003 election.

The constituency was dissolved in 2007 when State Duma adopted full proportional representation for the next two electoral cycles. Lgov constituency was not re-established for the 2016 election, currently most of former Lgov constituency is part of Kursk constituency.

== Boundaries ==
1993–2007: Belovsky District, Bolshesoldatsky District, Dmitriyevsky District, Fatezhsky District, Glushkovsky District, Konyshyovsky District, Korenevsky District, Khomutovsky District, Kurchatov, Kurchatovsky District, Lgov, Lgovsky District, Medvensky District, Oboyansky District, Oktyabrsky District, Ponyrovsky District, Pristensky District, Rylsky District, Sudzhansky District, Zheleznogorsk, Zheleznogorsky District, Zolotukhinsky District
The constituency covered western and central Kursk Oblast, including the towns of Kurchatov, Lgov and Zheleznogorsk.

== Members elected ==
| Election | Member | Party |
|---|---|---|
| 1993 | Aleksandr Potapenko | Independent |
| 1995 | Aleksandr Potapenko | Communist Party |
| 1999 | Aleksandr Chetverikov | Independent |
| 2003 | Aleksey Volkov | United Russia |

== Election results ==
=== 1993 ===
==== Declared candidates ====
- Anatoly Baskakov (Independent), chief of investigations at the MVD Kursk Oblast Division
- Artur Chubur (LDPR), local history methodologist
- Aleksey Lunev (Civic Union), former People's Deputy of Russia (1990–1993)
- Valentina Luneva (APR), union leader
- Pyotr Nadein (Independent), Chairman of the Kursk Oblast Committee on Culture (1993–present)
- Aleksandr Potapenko (Independent), head of Lgov wagon depot
- Anatoly Rukavitsyn (Independent), utilities executive
- Larisa Samotes (RDDR), union leader

==== Results ====
Summary of the 12 December 1993 Russian legislative election in the Lgov constituency
| Candidate | Party | Votes | % |
|---|---|---|---|
| Aleksandr Potapenko | Independent | 64,447 | 19.10% |
| Valentina Luneva | Agrarian Party | – | 15.50% |
| Anatoly Baskakov | Independent | – | – |
| Artur Chubur | Liberal Democratic Party | – | – |
| Aleksey Lunev | Civic Union | – | – |
| Pyotr Nadein | Independent | – | – |
| Anatoly Rukavitsyn | Independent | – | – |
| Larisa Samotes | Russian Democratic Reform Movement | – | – |
| Total | | 337,343 | 100% |

=== 1995 ===
==== Declared candidates ====
- Sergey Alferov (Independent), businessman
- Viktor Androsov (My Fatherland), vocational college director
- Anatoly Bozhko (Independent), military commissioner of Oboyansky District
- Vasily Domnikov (Independent), former Deputy Chairman of the Kursk Oblast Executive Committee – Chairman of the Agro-Industrial Complex
- Vitaly Gukov (APR), Member of State Duma (1994–present)
- Aleksandr Klesov (Independent), middle school teacher
- Vladimir Mikhalchev (Derzhava), military pensioner
- Aleksandr Potapenko (CPRF), incumbent Member of State Duma (1994–present)

==== Withdrawn candidates ====
- Yuri Antonov (LDPR), composer, estrada singer

==== Results ====
Summary of the 17 December 1995 Russian legislative election in the Lgov constituency
| Candidate | Party | Votes | % |
|---|---|---|---|
| Aleksandr Potapenko (incumbent) | Communist Party | 140,716 | 38.92% |
| Vladimir Mikhalchev | Derzhava | 56,106 | 15.52% |
| Sergey Alferov | Independent | 42,591 | 11.78% |
| Vitaly Gukov | Agrarian Party | 41,730 | 11.54% |
| Anatoly Bozhko | Independent | 13,995 | 3.87% |
| Aleksandr Klesov | Independent | 13,849 | 3.83% |
| Vasily Domnikov | Independent | 9,622 | 2.66% |
| Viktor Androsov | My Fatherland | 6,058 | 1.68% |
| against all | | 28,790 | 7.96% |
| Total | | 361,537 | 100% |

=== 1999 ===
==== Declared candidates ====
- Vladimir Bushenkov (Independent), chief of the Moscow Railway Kursk division
- Aleksandr Chetverikov (Independent), agriculture businessman
- Aleksandr Chukhrayov (OVR), chief doctor of the Kursk Oblast clinical hospital (1982–present)
- Vasily Korchev (NDR), regional farmers association chairman
- Vladimir Kutsenko (Nikolayev–Fyodorov Bloc)
- Pyotr Novikov (Independent), Russian Army officer
- Aleksandr Potapenko (CPRF), incumbent Member of State Duma (1994–present)
- Sergey Vasilyev (Independent), Deputy Chairman of the Kursk Oblast Committee on Health
- Aleksey Volkov (Independent), Chief of Kursk Oblast Militsiya (1996–present)

==== Failed to qualify ====
- Vladislav Aseyev (KTR–zSS), electrician
- Tatyana Khudyakova (Independent)
- Sergey Shestakov (DN)

==== Did not file ====
- Nina Polyanskaya (Independent)
- Ivan Rusanov (RSP), safety engineer at Kursk Nuclear Power Plant
- Sergey Sukalenko (LDPR)
- Pyotr Zerin (ROS), former People's Deputy of Russia (1990–1993)

==== Results ====
Summary of the 19 December 1999 Russian legislative election in the Lgov constituency
| Candidate | Party | Votes | % |
|---|---|---|---|
| Aleksandr Chetverikov | Independent | 86,950 | 28.13% |
| Aleksandr Potapenko (incumbent) | Communist Party | 74,160 | 24.00% |
| Aleksey Volkov | Independent | 45,074 | 14.58% |
| Aleksandr Chukhrayov | Fatherland – All Russia | 32,684 | 10.58% |
| Vladimir Bushenkov | Independent | 19,057 | 6.17% |
| Pyotr Novikov | Independent | 16,612 | 5.38% |
| Sergey Vasilyev | Independent | 7,760 | 2.51% |
| Vasily Korchev | Our Home – Russia | 2,331 | 0.75% |
| Vladimir Kutsenko | Andrey Nikolayev and Svyatoslav Fyodorov Bloc | 2,090 | 0.68% |
| against all | | 31,108 | 9.84% |
| Total | | 316,051 | 100% |

=== 2003 ===
==== Declared candidates ====
- Vasily Aleynikov (Independent), metal trading executive
- Grigory Amnuel (PVR-RPZh), film director, producer
- Margarita Aseyeva (RKRP-RPK), lyceum teacher
- Vadim Chelpanov (LDPR), middle school counsellor
- Aleksandr Chetverikov (Independent), incumbent Member of State Duma (2000–present)
- Vitaly Gukov (APR), Member of State Duma (1994–1995, 2000–present), 1995 candidate for this seat
- Violetta Kuznetsova (ORP Rus'), homemaker
- Anatoly Nevezhin (VR–ES), military pensioner
- Aleksandr Potapenko (CPRF), former Member of State Duma (1994–1999)
- Valery Skripkin (SPS), chairman of the party regional office
- Mikhail Smolin (Yabloko), unemployed
- Aleksey Volkov (United Russia), Chief of Kursk Oblast Militsiya (1996–present), 1999 candidate for this seat
- Viktor Vyrozhemsky (Independent), Member of Kursk Oblast Duma (2001–present), head of the Department of Federal Postal Service regional office (1997–present)
- Pyotr Zerin (Independent), former People's Deputy of Russia (1990–1993), 1999 candidate for this seat
- Viktor Zyukin (Independent), construction businessman

==== Failed to qualify ====
- Aleksandr Antyukhov (RPP-PSS), director of the Modern University for the Humanities, Kursk branch
- Andrey Krasilnikov (RPT), writer, playwright
- Nikolay Novikov (Independent), individual entrepreneur

==== Results ====
Summary of the 7 December 2003 Russian legislative election in the Lgov constituency
| Candidate | Party | Votes | % |
|---|---|---|---|
| Aleksey Volkov | United Russia | 72,622 | 25.40% |
| Aleksandr Chetverikov (incumbent) | Independent | 50,721 | 17.74% |
| Viktor Vyrozhemsky | Independent | 36,897 | 12.90% |
| Aleksandr Potapenko | Communist Party | 31,499 | 11.02% |
| Viktor Zyukin | Independent | 22,775 | 7.96% |
| Vasily Aleynikov | Independent | 8,791 | 3.07% |
| Vitaly Gukov | Agrarian Party | 6,486 | 2.27% |
| Vadim Chelpanov | Liberal Democratic Party | 5,657 | 1.98% |
| Margarita Aseyeva | Russian Communist Workers' Party — Russian Party of Communists | 5,105 | 1.79% |
| Mikhail Smolin | Yabloko | 3,362 | 1.18% |
| Pyotr Zerin | Independent | 2,818 | 0.99% |
| Valery Skripkin | Union of Right Forces | 1,582 | 0.55% |
| Violetta Kuznetsova | United Russian Party Rus' | 1,455 | 0.51% |
| Grigory Amnuel | Party of Russia's Rebirth-Russian Party of Life | 872 | 0.30% |
| Anatoly Nevezhin | Great Russia – Eurasian Union | 769 | 0.27% |
| against all | | 25,440 | 8.90% |
| Total | | 286,127 | 100% |
