= Zheleznogorsk =

Zheleznogorsk (Russian: Железного́рск) is the name of several populated places in Russia, and may refer to:

- Zheleznogorsk, Krasnoyarsk Krai, a closed town in Siberia that was once a secret town
- Zheleznogorsk, Kursk Oblast, a town located northwest of Kursk that serves as the administrative center of Zheleznogorsky District
- Zheleznogorsk-Ilimsky, a town and administrative center of Nizhneilimsky District in Irkutsk Oblast
- Zheleznogorsky District, an administrative and municipal district in Kursk Oblast
- Zheleznogorsk Airport, located just south of Zheleznogorsk-Ilimsky

== See also ==
- Zheleznogorsk Urban Okrug
- Zheleznogorsky (disambiguation)
