= Zheleznogorsk Urban Okrug =

Location of Krasnoyarsk Krai in Russia

Location of Kursk Oblast in Russia

Zheleznogorsk Urban Okrug is the name of several municipal formations in Russia. The following administrative divisions are incorporated as such:

- Closed Administrative-Territorial Formation of Zheleznogorsk, Krasnoyarsk Krai
- Town of Oblast Significance of Zheleznogorsk, Kursk Oblast

== See also ==
- Zheleznogorsk (disambiguation)
