= Timsky =

Timsky (masculine), Timskaya (feminine), or Timskoye (neuter) may refer to:

- Timsky District, a district of Kursk Oblast, Russia
- Timsky (rural locality), a rural locality (a khutor) in Rostov Oblast, Russia
