= Zheleznogorsky =

Zheleznogorsky (masculine), Zheleznogorskaya (feminine), or Zheleznogorskoye (neuter) are Russian place names, and may refer to:

- Zheleznogorsky District, a district in Kursk Oblast
- Zheleznogorskoye Urban Settlement, a municipal incorporation of the town of Zheleznogorsk-Ilimsky in Nizhneilimsky District of Irkutsk Oblast

== See also ==
- Zheleznogorsk (disambiguation)
