= Khomutovsky =

Khomutovsky (masculine), Khomutovskaya (feminine), or Khomutovskoye (neuter) may refer to:

- Khomutovsky District, a district of Kursk Oblast, Russia
- Khomutovskaya, a rural locality (a stanitsa) in Rostov Oblast, Russia
