= Magnitny =

Magnitny Магнитный
- Urban-type settlement
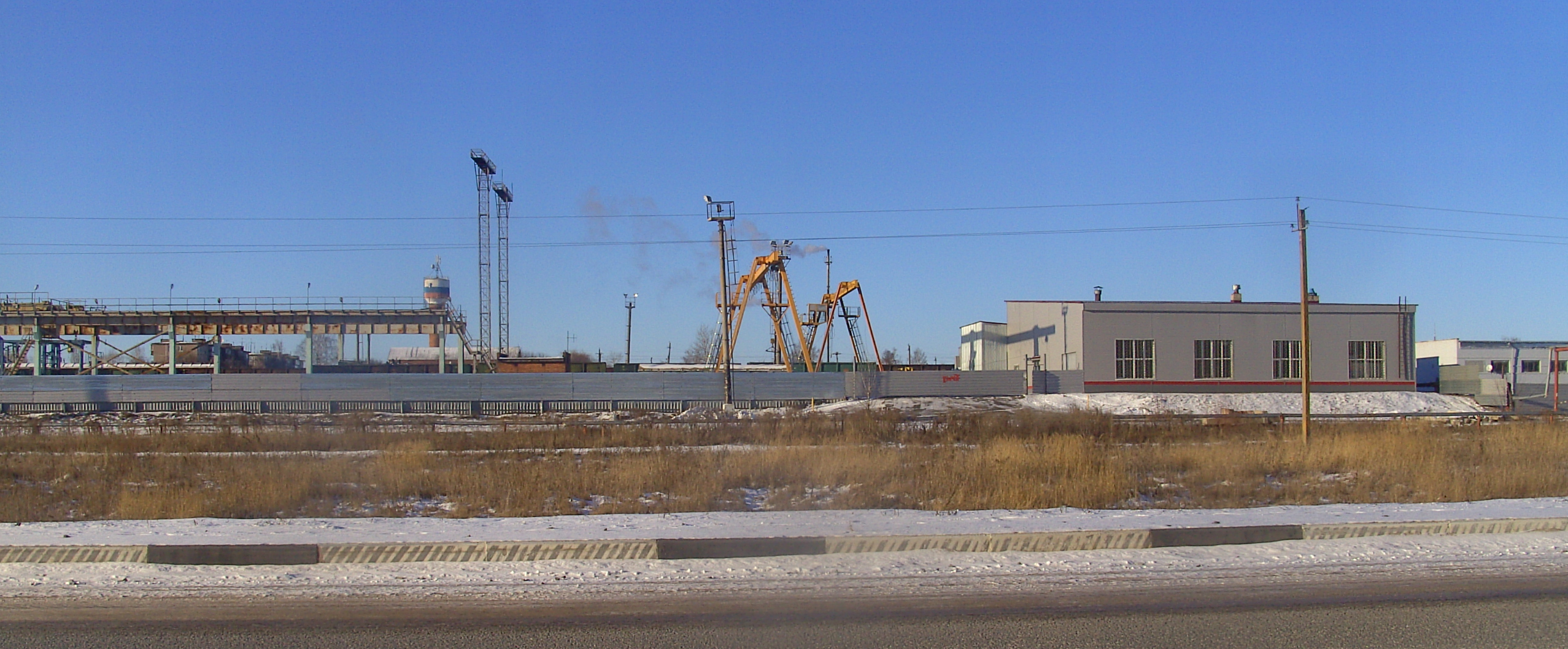
- Interactive map of Magnitny
- Location of Magnitny Magnitny (Kursk Oblast)
- Coordinates: 52.4346°N 35.5509°E
- Country: Russia
- Federal subject: Kursk Oblast
- Administrative district: Zheleznogorsky District
- Founded: 1978

Population (2010 Census)
  - Total: 1,964
  - Estimate (2025): 1,431 (−27.1%)
- Time zone: UTC+3 (MSK)
- Postal code: 307147
- OKTMO ID: 38610160051

Magnitny (Russian: Магнитный) is an urban locality (an urban-type settlement) in Zheleznogorsky District of Kursk Oblast, Russia. Population: 1,516 (2021 census); 1,964 (2010 census); 2,359 (2002 census); 2,176 (1989 Soviet census).
