= Kirovsky, Kursk Oblast =

Kirovsky Кировский
- Urban-type settlement
- Interactive map of Kirovsky
- Location of Kirovsky Kirovsky (Kursk Oblast)
- Coordinates: 51.2984°N 36.6863°E
- Country: Russia
- Federal subject: Kursk Oblast
- Administrative district: Pristensky District

Population (2010 Census)
  - Total: 2,776
  - Estimate (2025): 2,372 (−14.6%)
- Time zone: UTC+3 (MSK)
- Postal code: 306211
- OKTMO ID: 38632152051

Kirovsky (Russian: Кировский) is an urban locality (an urban-type settlement) in Pristensky District of Kursk Oblast, Russia. Population: 2,529 (2021 census); 2,776 (2010 census); 3,114 (2002 census); 3,951 (1989 Soviet census).
