= Olga Germanova =

Russian politician (born 1961)

- Ольга Германова
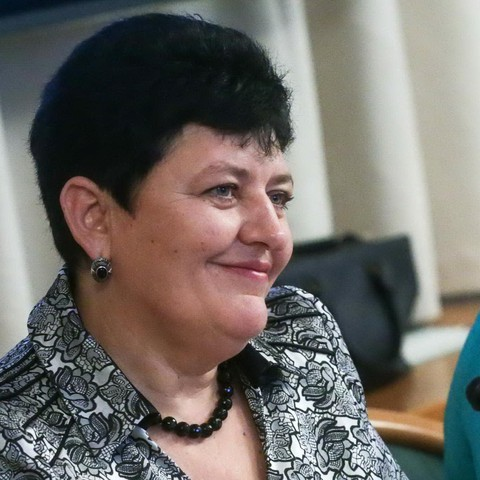

Member of the State Duma for Kursk Oblast
- Incumbent
- Assumed office 12 October 2021
- Preceded by: Aleksey Zolotarev
- Constituency: Seimsky (No. 110)

Member of the State Duma (Party List Seat)
- In office 5 October 2016 – 12 October 2021

Head of Kursk City Administration
- In office 8 November 2012 – 2016

Personal details
- Born: 26 September 1961 (age 65) Peny, Belovsky District, Kursk Oblast, RSFSR, USSR
- Party: United Russia
- Education: Kursk State University

Olga Mikhailovna Germanova (Russian: Ольга Михайловна Германова; born 26 September 1961, Peny, Belovsky District, Kursk Oblast) is a Russian political figure and a deputy of the 7th and 8th State Dumas.

From 1992 to 1999, she worked in the administration of the Kursk Oblast. In 1999-2009 she was Deputy Chairman of the Committee for Youth Affairs and Tourism of the Kursk Region. In 2009 she was appointed Deputy head of administration of Kursk. Simultaneously, she headed the youth headquarters of the Kursk regional branch of "United Russia". On 14 October 2012 she was elected deputy of the Kursk City Council of the 5th convocation. On 8 November 2012 Germanova was appointed the head of the Kursk City Administration. She left the post in 2016 as she was elected deputy of the 7th State Duma; she ran with the United Russia. In 2021, Germanova was re-elected for the 8th State Duma.

== Legislative Activity ==
From 2016 to 2019, during her tenure as a deputy of the 7th convocation of the State Duma, she co-authored 32 legislative initiatives and amendments to draft federal laws.

== Sanctions ==
She was sanctioned by the UK government in 2022 in relation to the Russo-Ukrainian War.
