= Olymsky =

Olymsky Олымский
- Urban-type settlement
- Interactive map of Olymsky
- Location of Olymsky Olymsky (Kursk Oblast)
- Coordinates: 51.7745°N 38.1616°E
- Country: Russia
- Federal subject: Kursk Oblast
- Administrative district: Kastorensky District
- Elevation: 169 m (554 ft)

Population (2010 Census)
  - Total: 2,618
  - Estimate (2025): 2,203 (−15.9%)
- Time zone: UTC+3 (MSK)
- Postal code: 306716
- OKTMO ID: 38614154051

Olymsky (Russian: Олымский) is an urban locality (an urban-type settlement) in Kastorensky District of Kursk Oblast, Russia. Population: 2,256 (2021 census); 2,618 (2010 census); 3,201 (2002 census); 6,373 (1989 Soviet census).
