= Novokastornoye =

Novokastornoye Новокасторное
- Urban-type settlement
- Interactive map of Novokastornoye
- Location of Novokastornoye Novokastornoye (Kursk Oblast)
- Coordinates: 51.7718°N 38.1183°E
- Country: Russia
- Federal subject: Kursk Oblast
- Administrative district: Kastorensky District

Population (2010 Census)
  - Total: 2,014
  - Estimate (2025): 1,487 (−26.2%)
- Time zone: UTC+3 (MSK)
- Postal code: 306707
- OKTMO ID: 38614153051

Novokastornoye (Russian: Новокасторное) is an urban locality (an urban-type settlement) in Kastorensky District of Kursk Oblast, Russia. Population: 1,594 (2021 census); 2,014 (2010 census); 2,508 (2002 census);
