= Tyotkino =

Tyotkino Тёткино
- Urban-type settlement
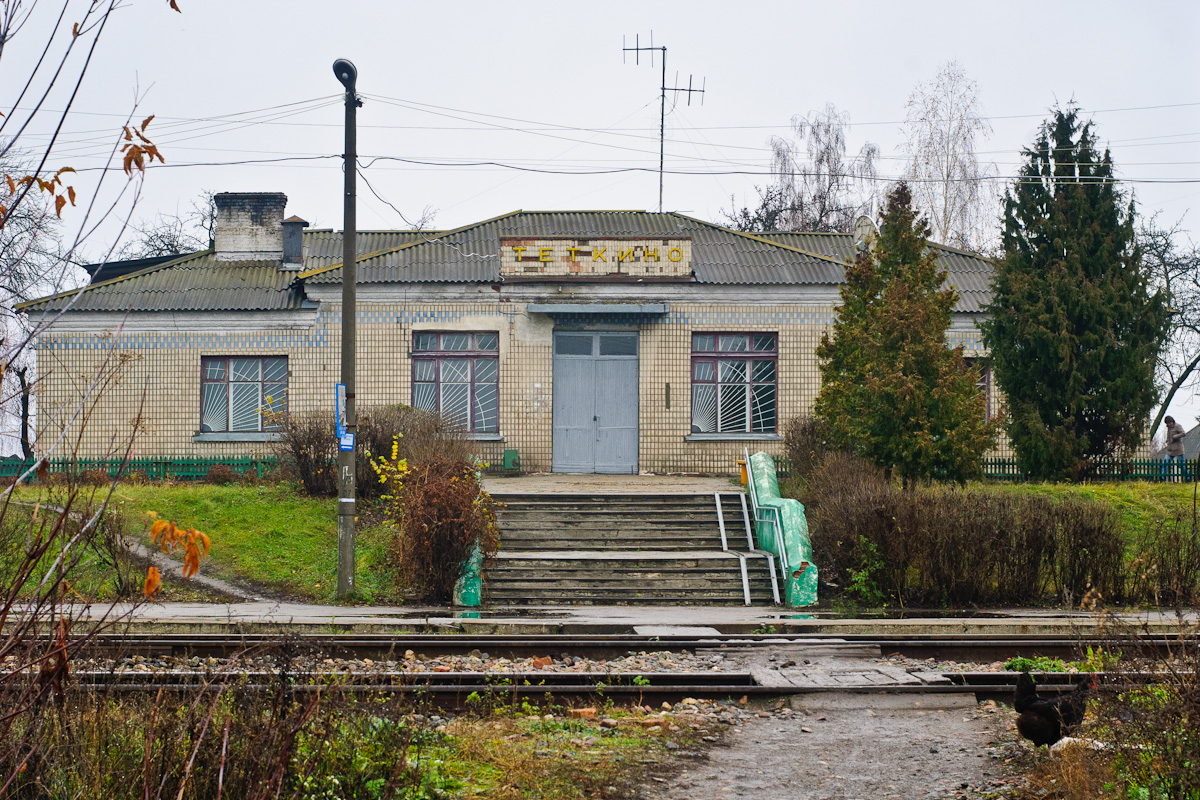
- Tyotkino railway station
- Interactive map of Tyotkino
- Location of Tyotkino Tyotkino (Russia)
- Coordinates: 51.2725°N 34.3033°E
- Country: Russia
- Federal subject: Kursk Oblast
- Administrative district: Glushkovsky District
- Elevation: 146 m (479 ft)

Population (2010 Census)
  - Total: 4,223
  - Estimate (1 January 2024): 3,624 (−14.2%)
- Time zone: UTC+3 (MSK)
- Postal code: 307490
- OKTMO ID: 38604155051

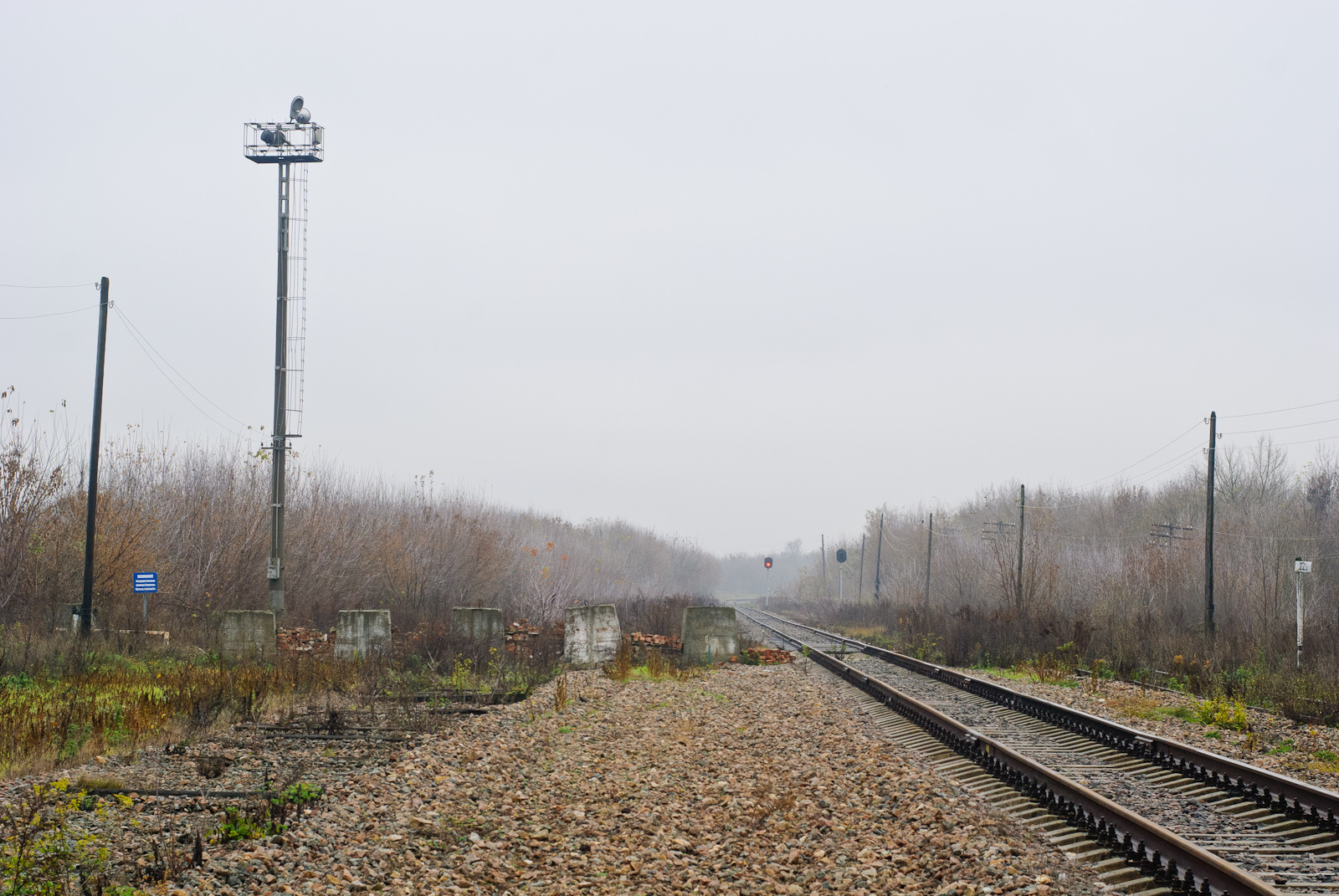
Railway line crossing the Russia–Ukraine border at Tyotkino

Tyotkino (Russian: Тёткино) is an urban locality (an urban-type settlement) on the left bank of the Seym river in Glushkovsky District of Kursk Oblast, Russia. Population: 3,852 (2021 census); 4,223 (2010 census); 5,224 (2002 census); 5,375 (1989 Soviet census).

== Geography ==
It is on a small salient of Russian territory, with the Russia–Ukraine border running on the north-west, south-west and south-east of the settlement. To the south is Sumy Raion and to the north-west is Konotop Raion, both in the Sumy Oblast of Ukraine.

== History ==
The year Tyotkino was founded is considered to be 1650. Tyotkino was founded by natives of the present Poltava region, as well as servicemen from the Moscow state, primarily those who carried out border service. According to the inventory of the stolnik F. G. Orlov (1685): "... The village of Tyotkino has 55 Cherkassy and 15 households of serfs. According to the testimony of landowners Grigory Bolshoi and Andrei Trifonov and his brothers, they built it about 40 years ago."

In 1861, a sugar factory was founded, and in 1865 a distillery (Tyotkinsky distillery) was put into operation, and then in 1886 a steam mill was put into operation. The owners of these enterprises were well known in Russia and Europe sugar manufacturers Tereshchenko (a representative of the Tereshchenko family, Mikhail Ivanovich Tereshchenko, 1886–1956, is an Honorary Citizen of Tetkino). Tyotkino acquired the features of a typical workers' settlement in post-reform Russia.

During World War II, the village was under German control from October 8, 1941, to September 2, 1943. During this time, 40 people were arrested and shot, 118 of Tyotkino's residents were transferred to Germany, and 12 supporters of the Soviet regime were publicly hanged. On September 2, 1943, the troops of the Voronezh Front crossed the Seim River and completely liberated the village.

It has been an urban-type settlement since 1957.

=== Involvement in the Russo-Ukrainian war ===
On March 12, 2024, during the ongoing Russo-Ukrainian war, the Freedom of Russia Legion announced they were in control of the village after a cross border raid, when the Russian soldiers fled leaving their positions and military equipment. Russia denied this statement, saying their forces were still in control of the village. The Legion stated that they had conducted the raid together with the Sibir and RDK battalions. During the Ukrainian incursion into Russia in August 2024, there was limited action around Tyotkino. On August 12, there were reports that Ukrainian forces launched a new incursion in the Tyotkino direction, and limited clashes were reported over the next week, although Russian forces maintained control of the settlement. By August 17, Russian milbloggers reported that Russian forces had blown up bridges over the Seim river in Tyotkino to prevent a Ukrainian advance.

In early May 2025, Ukraine again invaded Kursk Oblast, primarily near the settlement.

== Population ==
Population
1939	1959	1970	1979	1989	2002	2009
7849	↘7400	↘7058	↘6137	↘5375	↘5224	↘4550
2010	2012	2013	2014	2015	2016	2017
↘4223	↘4061	↘3956	↘3856	↘3743	↘3683	↘3610
2018	2019	2020	2021			
↘3508	↘3438	↘3337	↗3852			

== Image ==
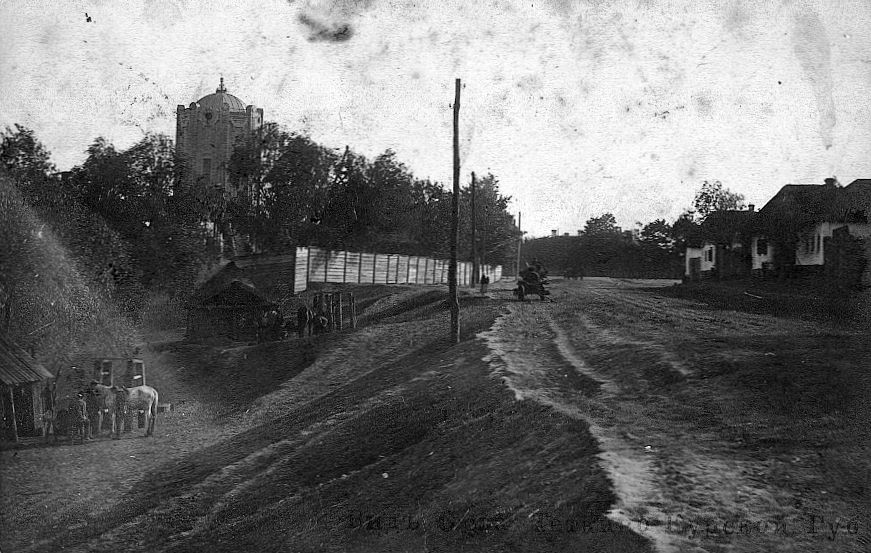
Tyotkino on a postcard, 1913

== Notable residents ==
- Ivan Anishchenko (1914–1996) was a Soviet military commander and Major General of the Engineer Corps.
- Anatoly Demyanovich (1908–1983) was Deputy Minister of Mechanical Engineering, Deputy Chairman of the State Planning Committee of the RSFSR, and twice winner of the Stalin Prize. He was born in Tyotkino on December 24, 1908. In April 2019, a book about him was published "Tanks and People: "Battles on the Way" by Chief Engineer Demyanovich".
- Serhii Peletminskyi (1931–2022) was an academician of the National Academy of Sciences of Ukraine, and a well-known specialist in the field of theoretical physics.
- Mikhail Sheynfeld (1922–2011) was a Russian historian.
