= Tim, Kursk Oblast =

Tim Тим
- Urban-type settlement
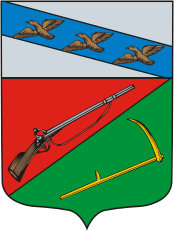
- Coat of arms
- Interactive map of Tim
- Location of Tim Tim (Kursk Oblast)
- Coordinates: 51.6218°N 37.1227°E
- Country: Russia
- Federal subject: Kursk Oblast
- Administrative district: Timsky District
- Elevation: 263 m (863 ft)

Population (2010 Census)
  - Total: 3,186
  - Estimate (2025): 2,880 (−9.6%)
- Time zone: UTC+3 (MSK)
- Postal code: 307060
- OKTMO ID: 38642151051

Tim (Russian: Тим) is an urban locality (an urban-type settlement) in Timsky District of Kursk Oblast, Russia. Population: 3,070 (2021 census); 3,186 (2010 census); 3,758 (2002 census); 4,104 (1989 Soviet census).

== History ==
Initially a village, it was granted town status and renamed Tim in 1779. In 1872, there were 73 craftsmen and two small factories in Tim. In the late 19th century, Tim hosted two weekly markets.

During World War II, the German occupiers operated a Jewish forced labour battalion in Tim.
