= Pristen, Pristensky District, Kursk Oblast =

Pristen Пристень
- Urban-type settlement
- Interactive map of Pristen
- Location of Pristen Pristen (Kursk Oblast)
- Coordinates: 51.2358°N 36.6950°E
- Country: Russia
- Federal subject: Kursk Oblast
- Administrative district: Pristensky District

Population (2010 Census)
  - Total: 5,297
  - Estimate (2025): 4,740 (−10.5%)
- Time zone: UTC+3 (MSK)
- Postal code: 306200
- OKTMO ID: 38632151051

Pristen (Russian: Пристень) is an urban locality (an urban-type settlement) in Pristensky District of Kursk Oblast, Russia. Population: 4,912 (2021 census); 5,297 (2010 census); 5,590 (2002 census); 5,696 (1989 Soviet census).
