= Oboyan =

Town in Kursk Oblast, Russia

Oboyan Обоянь
- Town
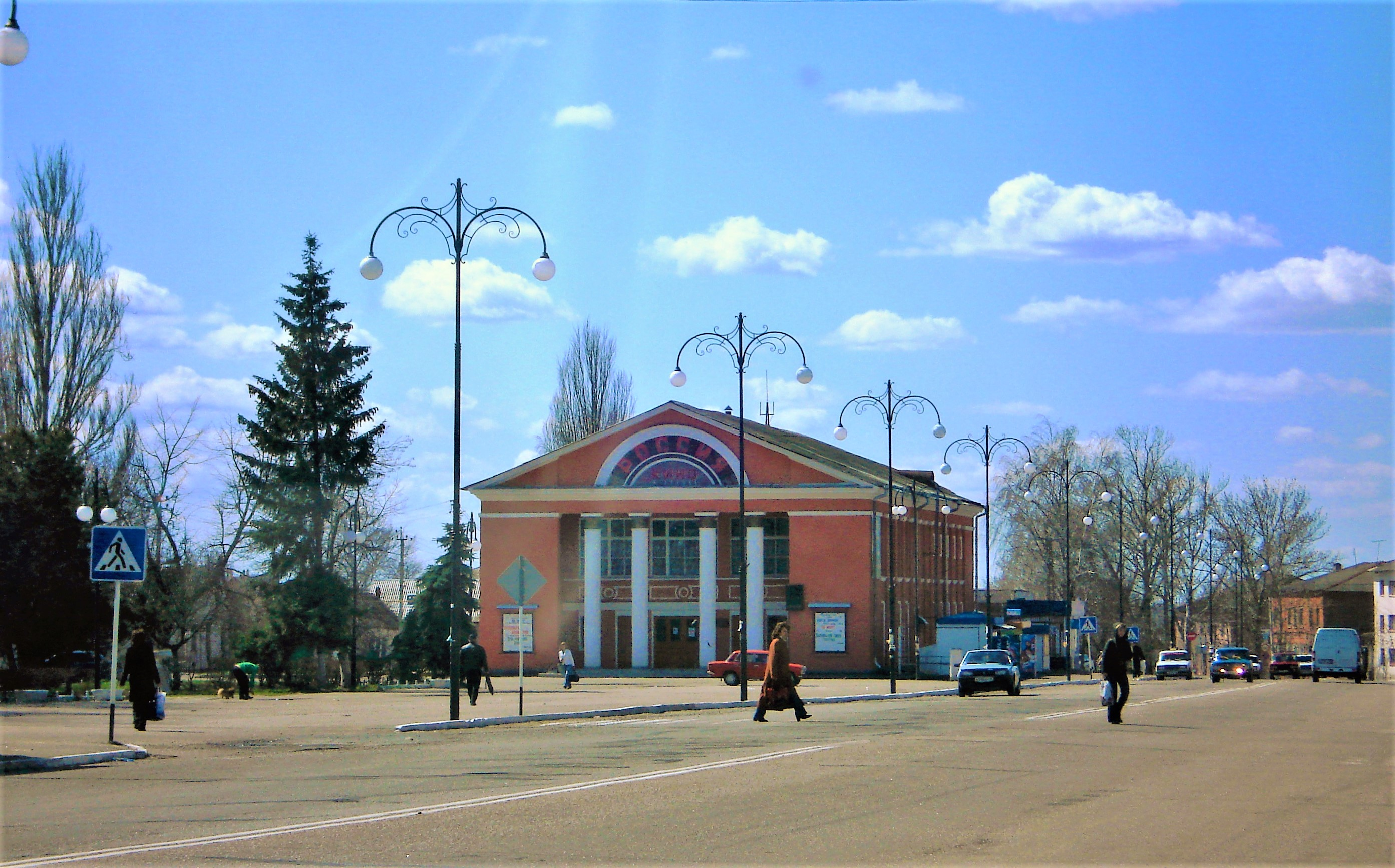
- Main square in Oboyan

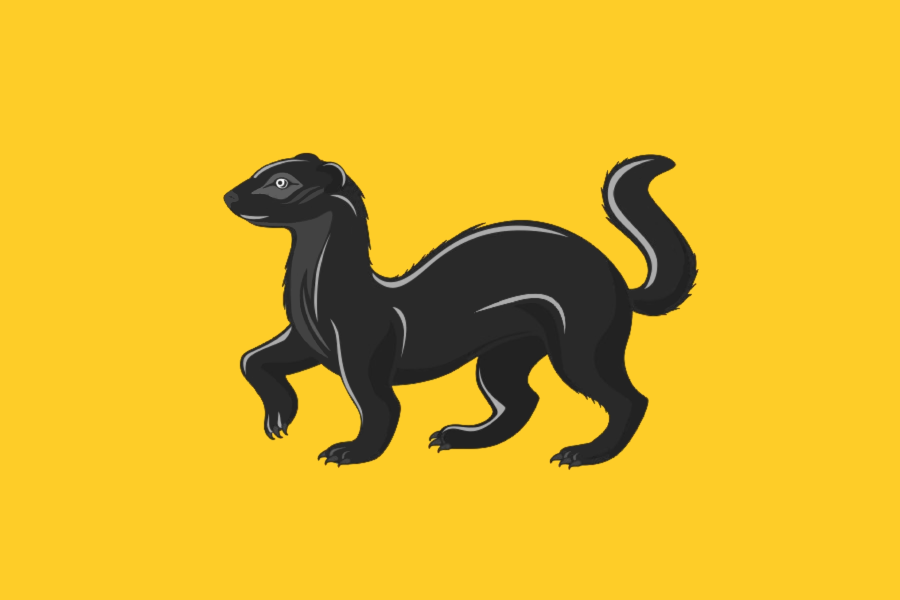
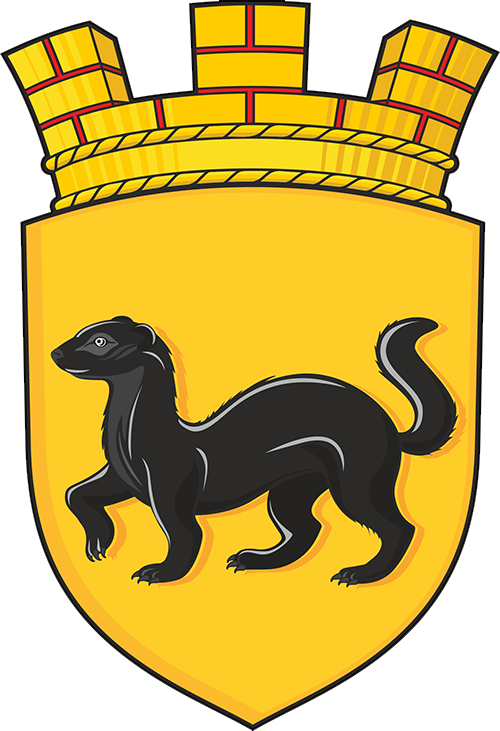
- Flag Coat of arms
- Interactive map of Oboyan
- Location of Oboyan Oboyan (Kursk Oblast)
- Coordinates: 51°12′N 36°17′E
- Country: Russia
- Federal subject: Kursk Oblast
- Administrative district: Oboyansky District
- Town of district significanceSelsoviet: Oboyan
- Founded: 1639
- Town status since: 1779
- Elevation: 180 m (590 ft)

Population (2010 Census)
  - Total: 13,565
  - Estimate (2024): 11,671 (−14%)

Administrative status
  - Capital of: Oboyansky District, town of district significance of Oboyan

Municipal status
  - Municipal district: Oboyansky Municipal District
  - Urban settlement: Oboyan Urban Settlement
  - Capital of: Oboyansky Municipal District, Oboyan Urban Settlement
- Time zone: UTC+3 (MSK)
- Postal codes: 306230, 306231, 306269
- OKTMO ID: 38626101001
- Website: www.oboyan.org

Oboyan (Russian: Обоя́нь) is a town and the administrative center of Oboyansky District in Kursk Oblast, Russia, located on the right bank of the Psyol at its confluence with the Oboyanka, 60 kilometers (37 mi) south of Kursk, the administrative center of the oblast. Population: 11,844 (2021 census); 13,565 (2010 census); 14,618 (2002 census); 15,360 (1989 Soviet census).

== History ==
It was founded in 1639 as a fortress on the southern borders of the Russian state. It was granted town status in 1779. During World War I, Oboyan was occupied by German troops on April 17–19, 1918. During the Russian Civil War, Oboyan was controlled by the troops of General Denikin on August 17–30, 1918 and from September 13, 1918 to November 26, 1919. During World War II, Oboyan was occupied by German troops from November 16, 1941 to February 18, 1943.

== Administrative and municipal status ==
Within the framework of administrative divisions, Oboyan serves as the administrative center of Oboyansky District. As an administrative division, it is incorporated within Oboyansky District as the town of district significance of Oboyan. As a municipal division, the town of district significance of Oboyan is incorporated within Oboyansky Municipal District as Oboyan Urban Settlement.
