= Kshensky =

Kshensky Кшенский
- Urban-type settlement
- Interactive map of Kshensky
- Location of Kshensky Kshensky (Kursk Oblast)
- Coordinates: 51.8443°N 37.7220°E
- Country: Russia
- Federal subject: Kursk Oblast
- Administrative district: Sovetsky District
- Elevation: 199 m (653 ft)

Population (2010 Census)
  - Total: 6,128
  - Estimate (2025): 5,282 (−13.8%)
- Time zone: UTC+3 (MSK)
- Postal code: 306600
- OKTMO ID: 38636151051

Kshensky (Russian: Кшенский) is an urban locality (an urban-type settlement) in Sovetsky District of Kursk Oblast, Russia. Population: 5,586 (2021 census); 6,128 (2010 census); 6,655 (2002 census); 7,513 (1989 Soviet census).
