= Shchigry, Kursk Oblast =

Town in Kursk Oblast, Russia

Shchigry Щигры
- Town
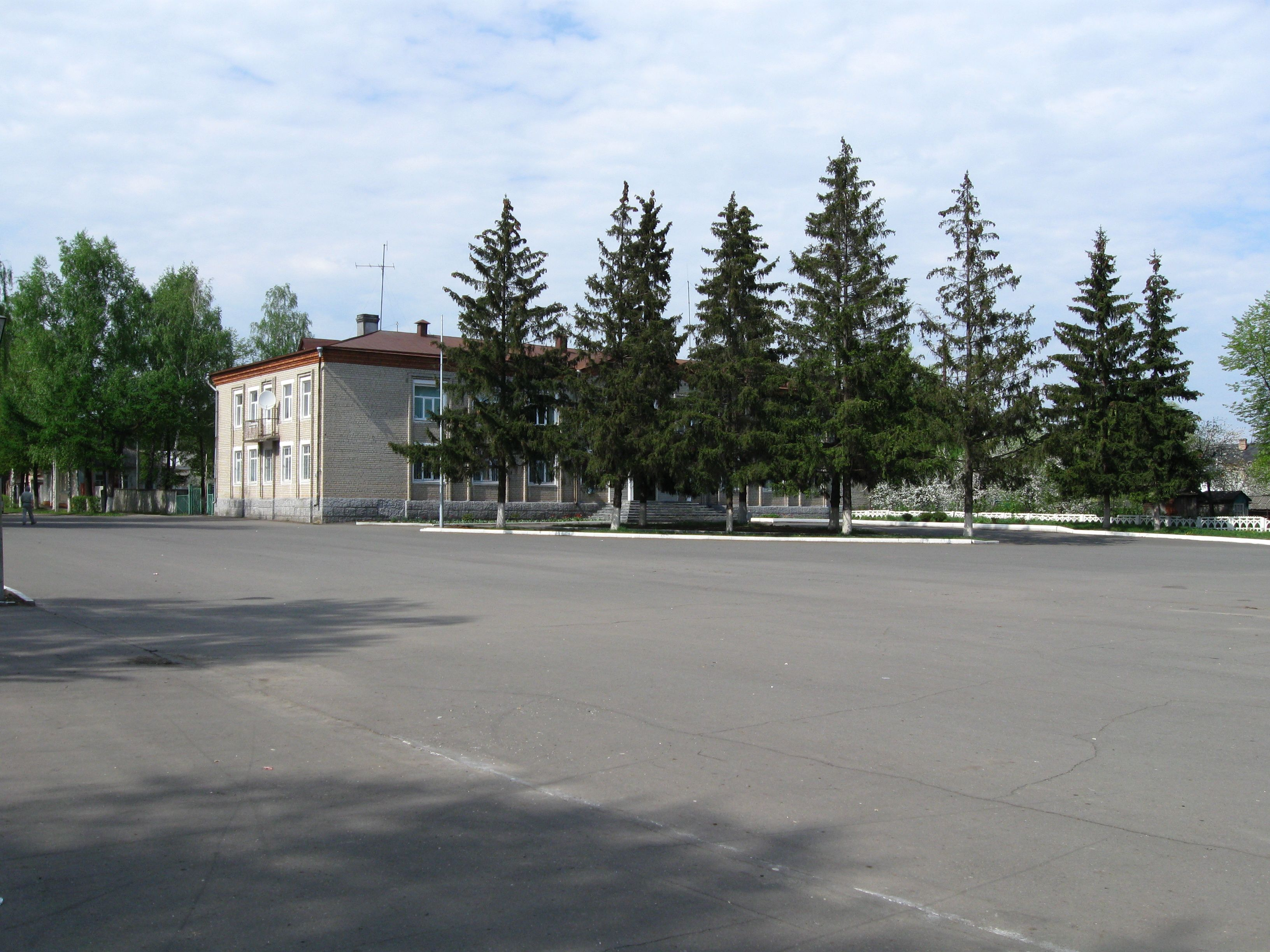
- Shchigry's central square

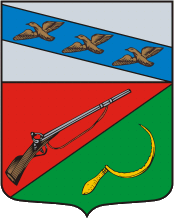
- Coat of arms
- Interactive map of Shchigry
- Location of Shchigry Shchigry (Kursk Oblast)
- Coordinates: 51°52′N 36°56′E
- Country: Russia
- Federal subject: Kursk Oblast
- Known since: 17th century
- Elevation: 204 m (669 ft)

Population (2010 Census)
  - Total: 17,040
  - Estimate (1 January 2024): 14,386 (−15.6%)

Administrative status
  - Subordinated to: town of oblast significance of Shchigry
  - Capital of: Shchigrovsky District, town of oblast significance of Shchigry

Municipal status
  - Urban okrug: Shchigry Urban Okrug
  - Capital of: Shchigry Urban Okrug, Shchigrovsky Municipal District
- Time zone: UTC+3 (MSK)
- Postal codes: 306530, 306531, 306532
- OKTMO ID: 38715000001
- Website: gshigry.rkursk.ru

Shchigry (Russian: Щигры́) is a town in Kursk Oblast, Russia, located between the Shchigra and Lesnaya Plata Rivers, 60 kilometers (37 mi) northeast of Kursk. Population: 14,927 (2021 census); 17,040 (2010 census); 19,582 (2002 census); 21,187 (1989 Soviet census); 18,000 (1974).

== History ==
It has been known to exist since the 17th century as a village called Troitskoye na Shchigrakh. In 1779, it was renamed Shchigry. During World War II, Shchigry was occupied by German troops from 21 November 1941 to 5 February 1943.

== Administrative and municipal status ==
Within the framework of administrative divisions, Shchigry serves as the administrative center of Shchigrovsky District, even though it is not a part of it. As an administrative division, it is incorporated separately as the town of oblast significance of Shchigry—an administrative unit with the status equal to that of the districts. As a municipal division, the town of oblast significance of Shchigry is incorporated as Shchigry Urban Okrug.

== Notable people ==
- Ilya Ivanovich Ivanov (1870–1932), biologist expert in artificial insemination
