= Dmitriyevsky District =

Dmitriyevsky District Дмитриевский район (Russian)
- District
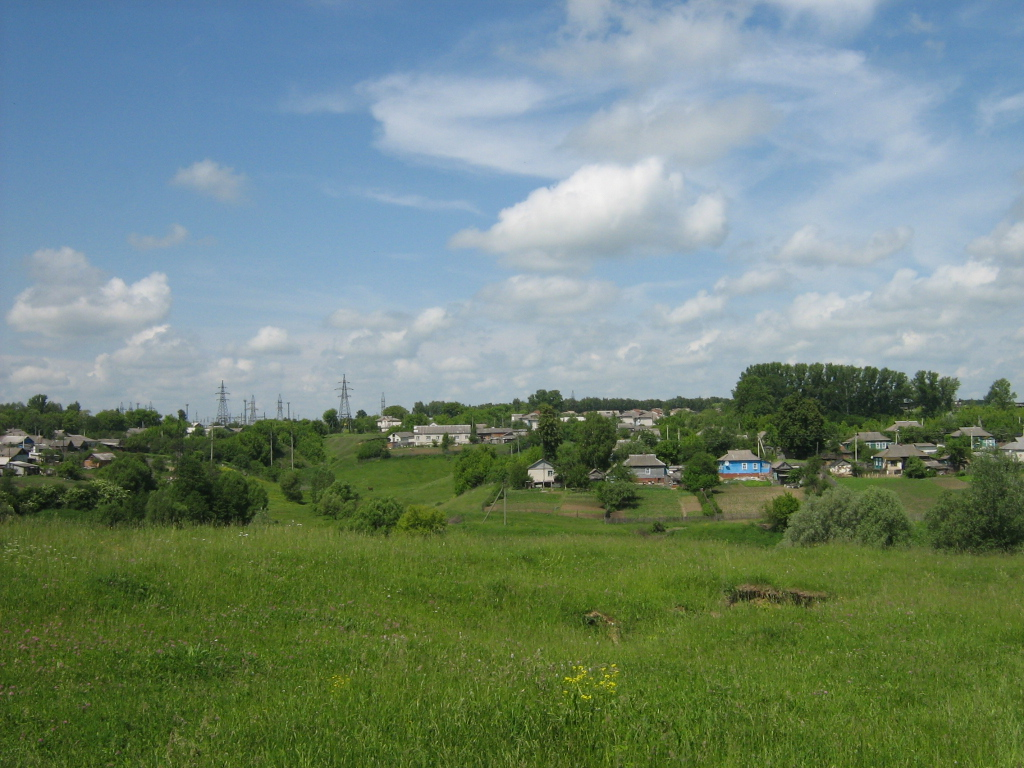
- Krupets, in Dmitriyevsky District

- Coat of arms
- Location of Dmitriyevsky District in Kursk Oblast
- Coordinates: 52°07′N 35°04′E
- Country: Russia
- Federal subject: Kursk Oblast
- Established: 1928
- Administrative center: Dmitriyev

Area
  - Total: 1,270 km^{2} (490 sq mi)

Population (2010 Census)
  - Total: 18,088
  - Density: 14.2/km^{2} (36.9/sq mi)
  - Urban: 42.7%
  - Rural: 57.3%

Administrative structure
  - Administrative divisions: 1 Towns of district significance, 19 Selsoviets
  - Inhabited localities: 1 cities/towns, 123 rural localities

Municipal structure
  - Municipally incorporated as: Dmitriyevsky Municipal District
  - Municipal divisions: 1 urban settlements, 7 rural settlements
- Time zone: UTC+3 (MSK)
- OKTMO ID: 38608000
- Website: http://dmitriev.rkursk.ru/

Dmitriyevsky District (Russian: Дми́триевский райо́н) is an administrative and municipal district (raion), one of the twenty-eight in Kursk Oblast, Russia. It is located in the northwest of the oblast. The area of the district is 1,270 square kilometers (490 sq mi). Its administrative center is the town of Dmitriyev. Population: 13,936 (2021 census); 18,088 (2010 census); 22,420 (2002 Census); 31,206 (1989 Soviet census). The population of Dmitriyev accounts for 45.3% of the district's total population.

== Geography ==
Dmitriyevsky District is located in the northwest of Kursk Oblast, on the border with Bryansk Oblast to the north. The terrain is hilly plain dissected by ravines; there are 81 rivers and streams in the district, which lies on the Central Russian Upland. The main river in the district is the Svapa River, which flows southwest into the Seym River. The district is 65 km northwest of the city of Kursk, and 420 km southwest of Moscow The area measures 51 km (north-south), and 53 km (west-east). The administrative center is the town of Dmitriev.

The district is bordered on the north by Komarichsky District and Sevsky District of Bryansk Oblast, on the east by Zheleznogorsky District, on the south by Konyshyovsky District, and on the west by Khomutovsky District.
