= Khomutovsky District =

Khomutovsky District Хомутовский район (Russian)
- District
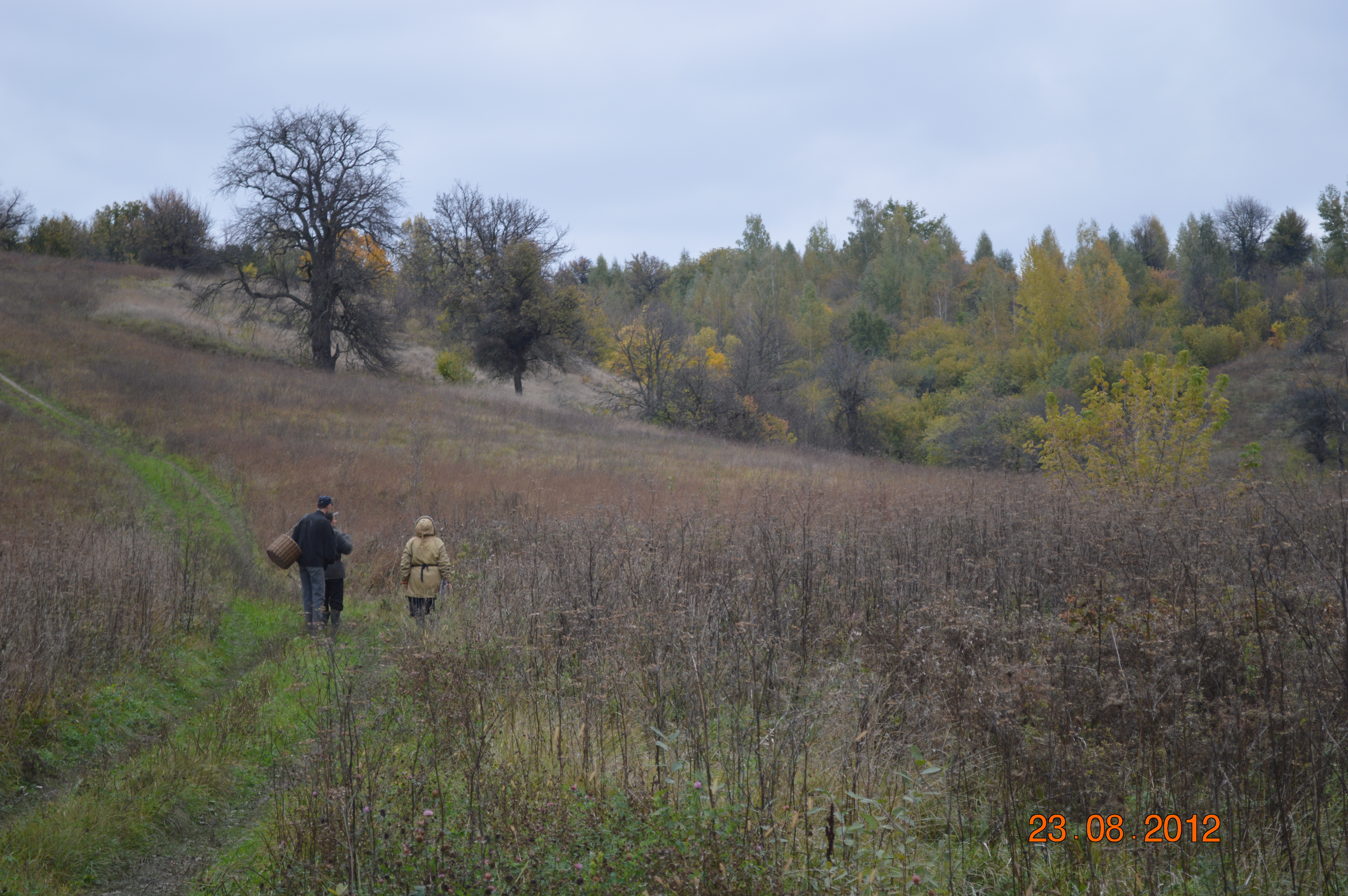
- Scene in Khomutovsky District

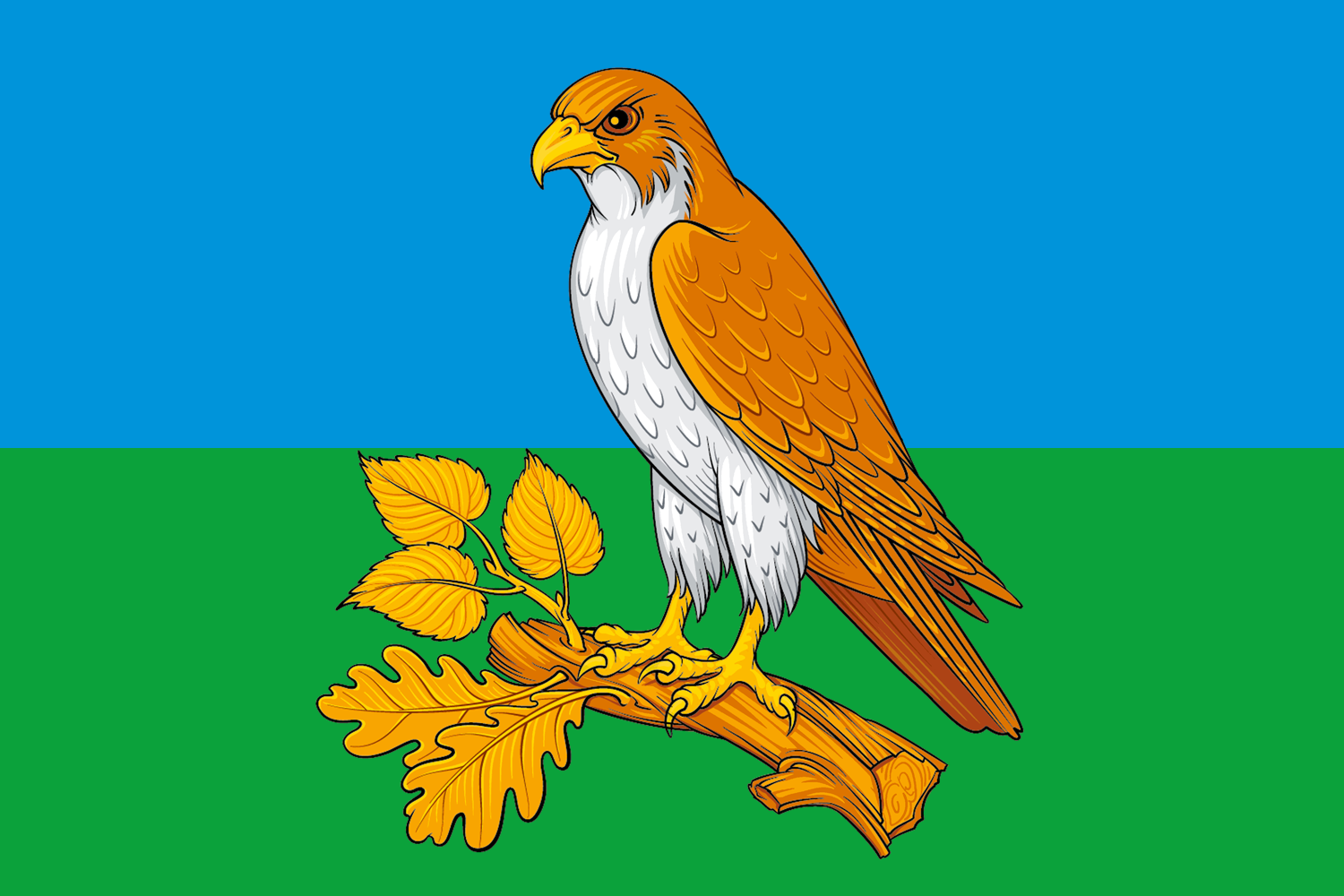
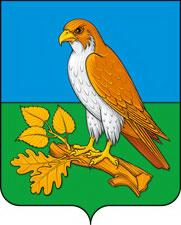
- Flag Coat of arms
- Location of Khomutovsky District in Kursk Oblast
- Coordinates: 51°55′06″N 34°33′35″E
- Country: Russia
- Federal subject: Kursk Oblast
- Administrative center: Khomutovka

Area
  - Total: 1,194 km^{2} (461 sq mi)

Population (2010 Census)
  - Total: 11,429
  - Density: 9.572/km^{2} (24.79/sq mi)
  - Urban: 37.0%
  - Rural: 63.0%

Administrative structure
  - Administrative divisions: 1 Work settlements, 20 Selsoviets
  - Inhabited localities: 1 urban-type settlements, 138 rural localities

Municipal structure
  - Municipally incorporated as: Khomutovsky Municipal District
  - Municipal divisions: 1 urban settlements, 8 rural settlements
- Time zone: UTC+3 (MSK)
- OKTMO ID: 38646000
- Website: http://homutov.rkursk.ru/

Khomutovsky District (Russian: Хомуто́вский райо́н) is an administrative and municipal district (raion), one of the twenty-eight in Kursk Oblast, Russia. It is located in the west of the oblast. The area of the district is 1,194 square kilometers (461 sq mi). Its administrative center is the urban locality (a work settlement) of Khomutovka. Population: 8,539 (2021 census); 11,429 (2010 census); 16,432 (2002 Census); 21,110 (1989 Soviet census). The population of Khomutovka accounts for 43.9% of the district's total population.

== Geography ==
Khomutovsky District is located in the west of Kursk Oblast, on the border with Ukraine. The terrain is hilly plain averaging 200 meters above sea level; the district lies on the Orel-Kursk plateau of the Central Russian Upland. The main river in the district is the Svapa River. The district is 80 km northeast of the city of Kursk, and 470 km southwest of Moscow. The area measures 35 km (north-south), and 40 km (west-east). The administrative center is the town of Khomutovka.

The district is bordered on the north by Dmitriyevsky District, on the east by Konyshyovsky District, on the south by Rylsky District, and on the west by Bryansk Oblast and a border with Ukraine.
