= Shchigrovsky District =

Shchigrovsky District Щигровский район
- District
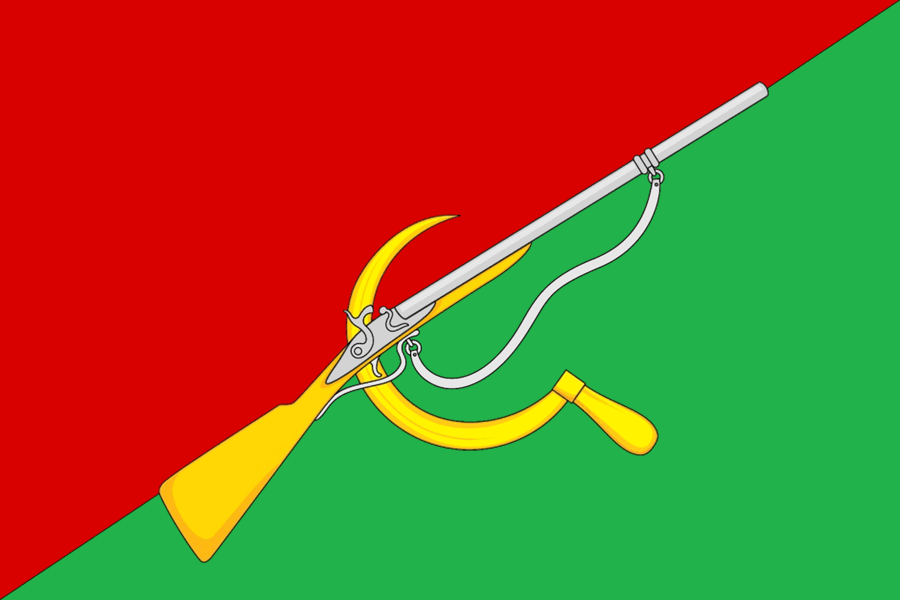
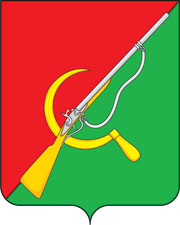
- Flag Coat of arms
- Location of Shchigrovsky District in Kursk Oblast
- Coordinates: 51°52′N 36°56′E
- Country: Russia
- Federal subject: Kursk Oblast
- Established: 16 July 1928
- Administrative center: Shchigry

Area
  - Total: 1,220 km^{2} (470 sq mi)

Population (2010 Census)
  - Total: 11,994
  - Density: 9.83/km^{2} (25.5/sq mi)
  - Urban: 0%
  - Rural: 100%

Administrative structure
  - Administrative divisions: 18 selsoviet
  - Inhabited localities: 167 rural localities

Municipal structure
  - Municipally incorporated as: Shchigrovsky Municipal District
  - Municipal divisions: 0 urban settlements, 18 rural settlements
- Time zone: UTC+3 (MSK)
- OKTMO ID: 38650000
- Website: http://shigry.rkursk.ru/

Shchigrovsky District (Russian: Щигро́вский райо́н) is an administrative and municipal district (raion), one of the twenty-eight in Kursk Oblast, Russia. It is located in the north of the oblast. The area of the district is 1,220 square kilometers (470 sq mi). Its administrative center is the town of Shchigry (which is not administratively a part of the district). Population: 9,470 (2021 Census); 11,994 (2010 Census); 15,099 (2002 Census); 18,072 (1989 Soviet census).

== Administrative and municipal status ==
Within the framework of administrative divisions, Shchigrovsky District is one of the twenty-eight in the oblast. The town of Shchigry serves as its administrative center, despite being incorporated separately as a town of oblast significance—an administrative unit with the status equal to that of the districts.

As a municipal division, the district is incorporated as Shchigrovsky Municipal District. The town of oblast significance of Shchigry is incorporated separately from the district as Shchigry Urban Okrug.
