= Oboyansky District =

Oboyansky District Обоянский район (Russian)
- District
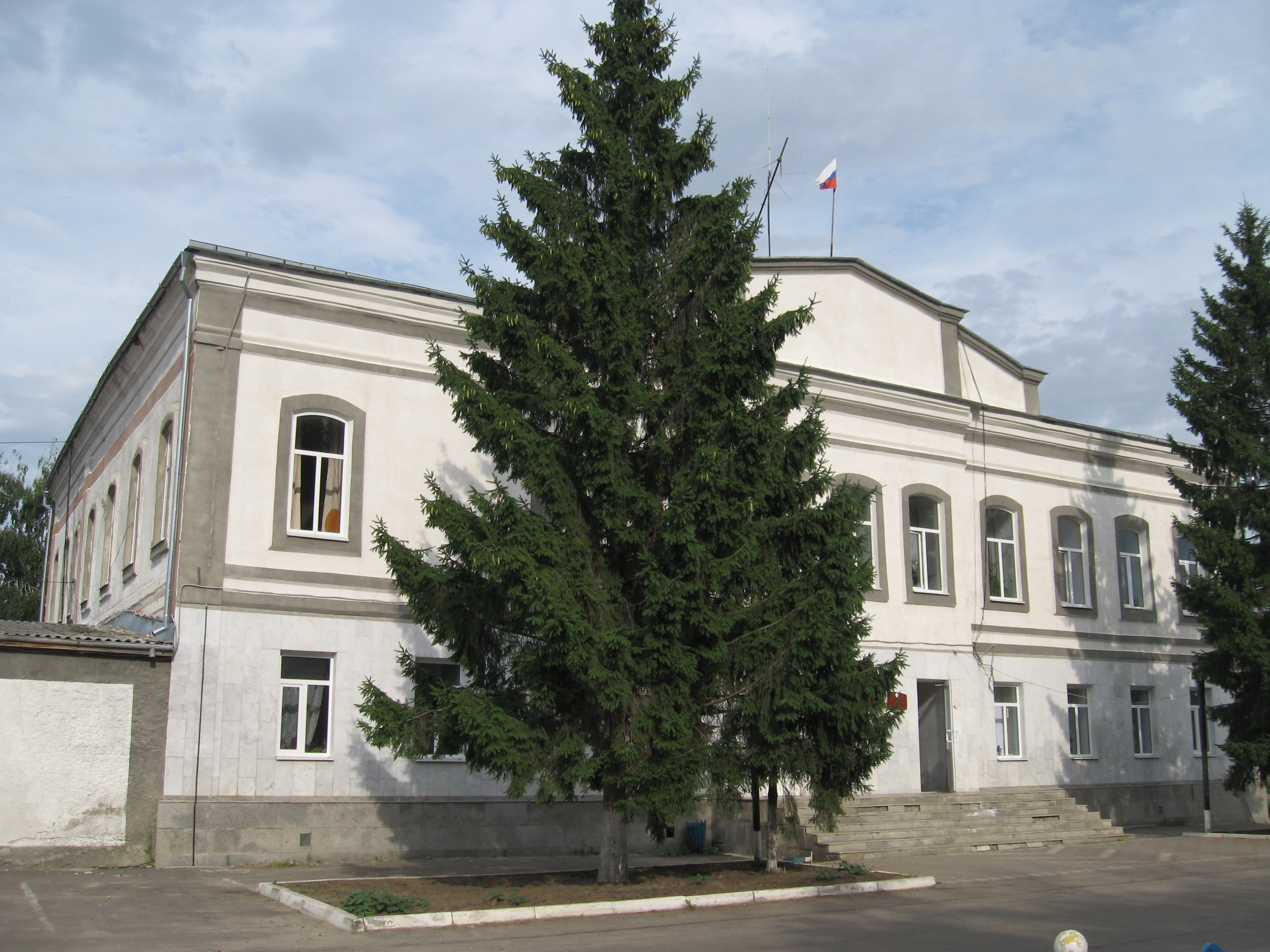
- Oboyansky District Administration building in Oboyan

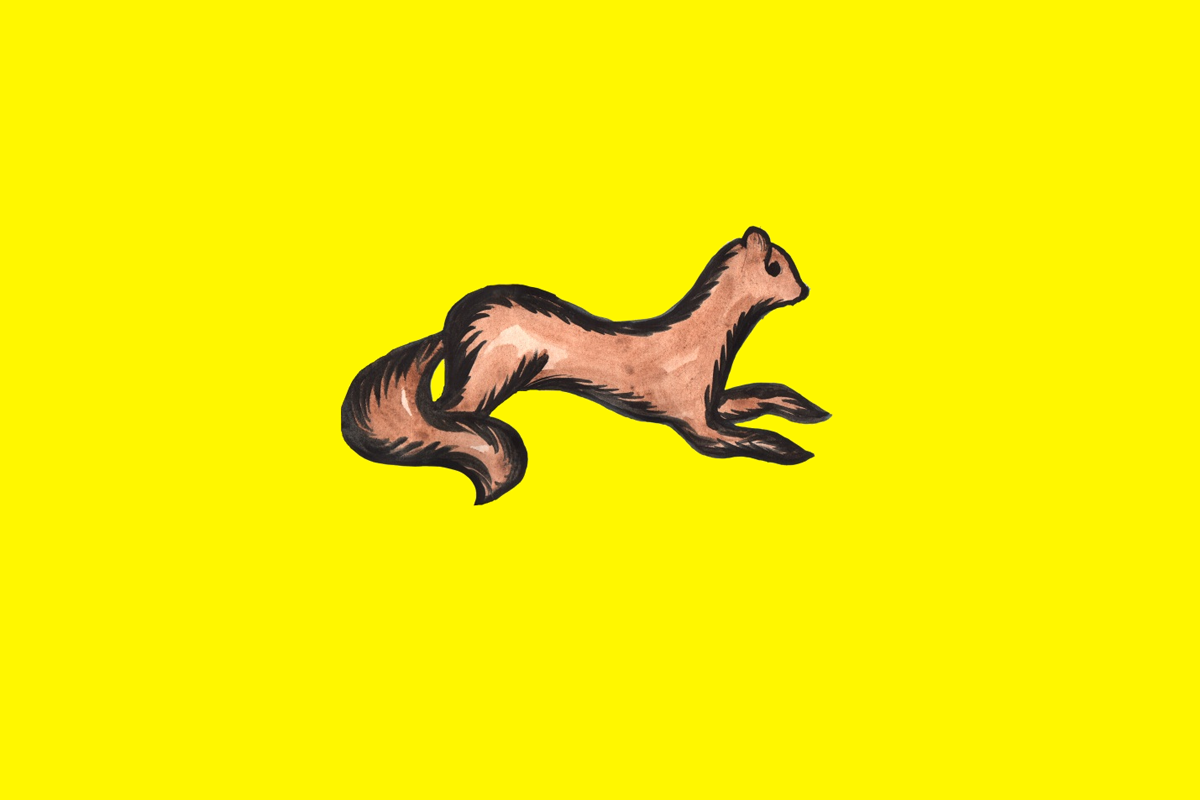
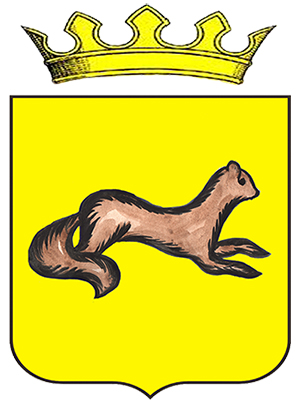
- Flag Coat of arms
- Location of Oboyansky District in Kursk Oblast
- Coordinates: 51°13′N 36°15′E
- Country: Russia
- Federal subject: Kursk Oblast
- Established: 30 July 1928
- Administrative center: Oboyan

Area
  - Total: 1,090 km^{2} (420 sq mi)

Population (2010 Census)
  - Total: 31,042
  - Density: 28.5/km^{2} (73.8/sq mi)
  - Urban: 43.7%
  - Rural: 56.3%

Administrative structure
  - Administrative divisions: 1 Towns of district significance, 19 Selsoviets
  - Inhabited localities: 1 cities/towns, 83 rural localities

Municipal structure
  - Municipally incorporated as: Oboyansky Municipal District
  - Municipal divisions: 1 urban settlements, 12 rural settlements
- Time zone: UTC+3 (MSK)
- OKTMO ID: 38626000
- Website: http://oboyan.rkursk.ru/

Oboyansky District (Russian: Обоя́нский райо́н) is an administrative and municipal district (raion), one of the twenty-eight in Kursk Oblast, Russia. It is located in the south of the oblast. The area of the district is 1,090 square kilometers (420 sq mi). Its administrative center is the town of Oboyan. Population: 27,923 (2021 census); 31,042 (2010 census); 35,815 (2002 Census); 39,663 (1989 Soviet census). The population of Oboyan accounts for 42.4% of the district's total population.

== Geography ==
Oboyansky District is located in the south central region of Kursk Oblast on the border with Belgorod Oblast. The terrain is hilly plain on the Central Russian Upland. The main river in the district is the Psel River, which flows south from the district into Ukraine, where it empties into the Dnieper River. The Psel is typically frozen from November to March. The district is 40 km (25 mi) south of the city of Kursk and 490 km (300 mi) southwest of Moscow. The area measures 25 km (16 mi) (north-south), and 40 km (25 mi) (west-east). The administrative center is the town of Oboyan.

The district is bordered on the north by Medvensky District, on the east by Pristensky District, on the south by Ivnyansky District of Belgorod Oblast, and on the west by Belovsky District.
