= Ponyrovsky District =

Ponyrovsky District Поныровский район (Russian)
- District
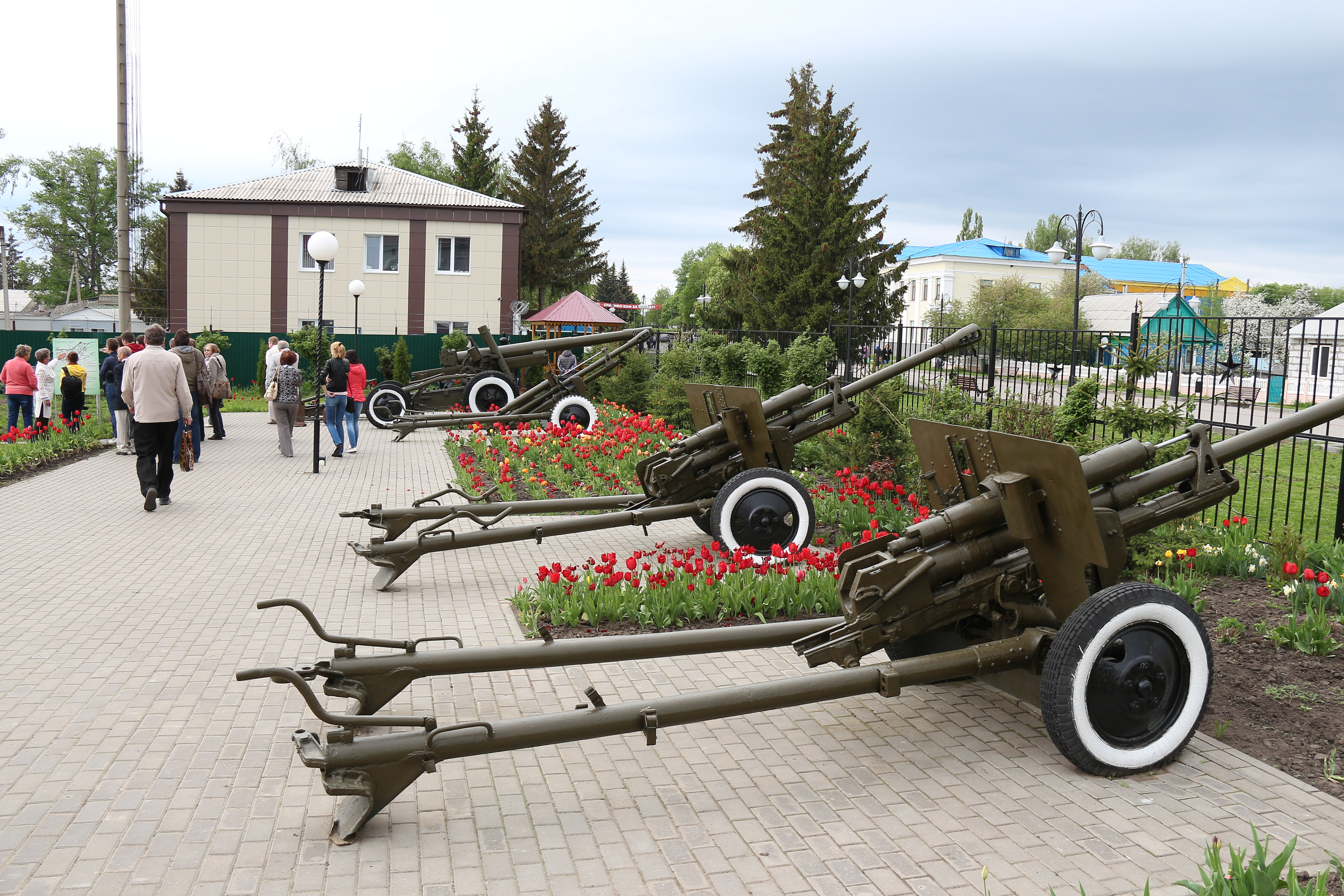
- War Museum in Ponyri, Ponyrovsky District

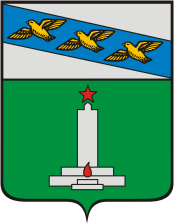
- Coat of arms
- Location of Ponyrovsky District in Kursk Oblast
- Coordinates: 52°19′N 36°18′E
- Country: Russia
- Federal subject: Kursk Oblast
- Administrative center: Ponyri

Area
  - Total: 690 km^{2} (270 sq mi)

Population (2010 Census)
  - Total: 11,778
  - Density: 17/km^{2} (44/sq mi)
  - Urban: 40.7%
  - Rural: 59.3%

Administrative structure
  - Administrative divisions: 1 Work settlements, 13 Selsoviets
  - Inhabited localities: 1 urban-type settlements, 48 rural localities

Municipal structure
  - Municipally incorporated as: Ponyrovsky Municipal District
  - Municipal divisions: 1 urban settlements, 7 rural settlements
- Time zone: UTC+3 (MSK)
- OKTMO ID: 38630000
- Website: http://ponirir.rkursk.ru/

Ponyrovsky District (Russian: Поныро́вский райо́н) is an administrative and municipal district (raion), one of the twenty-eight in Kursk Oblast, Russia. It is located in the north of the oblast. The area of the district is 690 square kilometers (270 sq mi). Its administrative center is the urban locality (a work settlement) of Ponyri. Population: 10,893 (2021 census); 11,778 (2010 census); 13,553 (2002 Census); 15,694 (1989 Soviet census). The population of Ponyri accounts for 45.1% of the district's total population.

== Geography ==
Ponyrovsky District is located in the north central region of Kursk Oblast, on the border with Oryol Oblast. The terrain is hilly plain on the Orel-Kursk plateau of the Central Russian Upland. The district is 45 km north of the city of Kursk and 400 km southwest of Moscow. The area measures 25 km (north-south), and 35 km (west-east). The administrative center is the town of Ponyri.

The district is bordered on the north by Oryol Oblast, on the southeast by Zolotukhinsky District, and on the west by Fatezhsky District.
