= Glushkovsky District =

Glushkovsky District Глушковский район (Russian)
- District
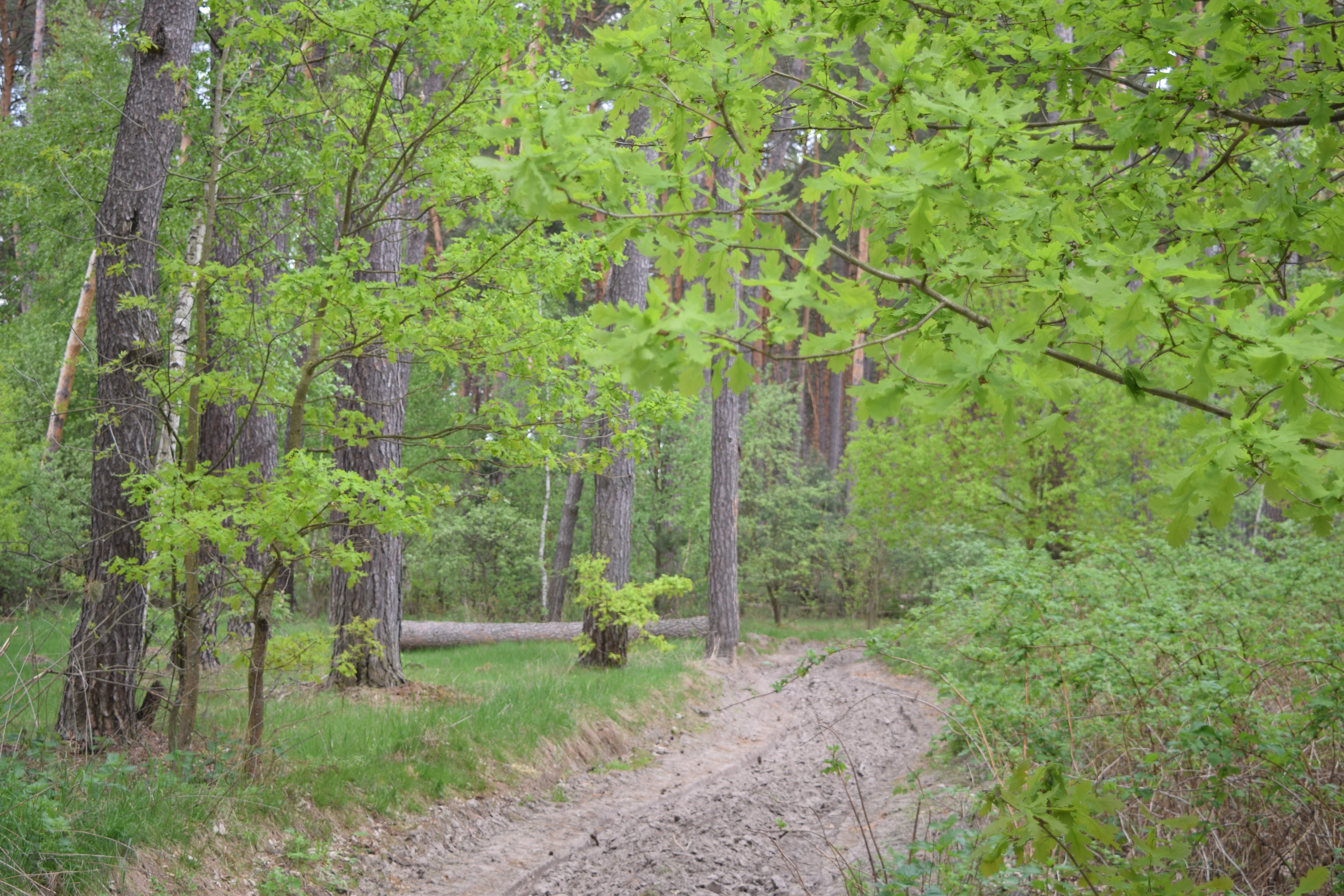
- Karizhsky reserve, Glushkovsky District

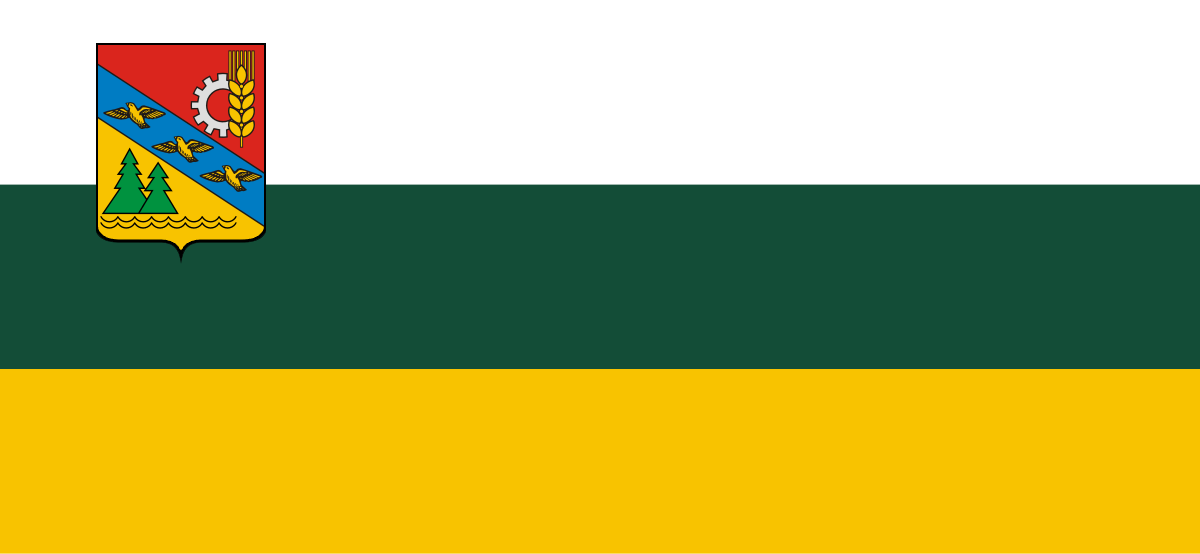
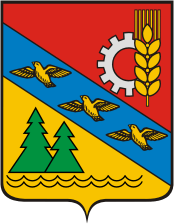
- Flag Coat of arms
- Location of Glushkovsky District in Kursk Oblast
- Coordinates: 51°20′00″N 34°38′00″E
- Country: Russia
- Federal subject: Kursk Oblast
- Administrative center: Glushkovo

Area
  - Total: 851 km^{2} (329 sq mi)

Population (2010 Census)
  - Total: 22,661
  - Density: 26.6/km^{2} (69.0/sq mi)
  - Urban: 42.2%
  - Rural: 57.8%

Administrative structure
  - Administrative divisions: 2 Work settlements, 14 Selsoviets
  - Inhabited localities: 2 urban-type settlements, 51 rural localities

Municipal structure
  - Municipally incorporated as: Glushkovsky Municipal District
  - Municipal divisions: 2 urban settlements, 11 rural settlements
- Time zone: UTC+3 (MSK)
- OKTMO ID: 38604000
- Website: http://glushkovo-kursk.narod.ru/

Glushkovsky District (Russian: Глушко́вский райо́н) is an administrative and municipal district (raion), one of the twenty-eight in Kursk Oblast, Russia. It is located in the south-west of the oblast, on the border with Ukraine. The area of the district is 851 square kilometers (329 sq mi). Its administrative center is the urban locality (a work settlement) of Glushkovo. The oblast has a population of 20,024 (2021 census); 22,661 (2010 census); 28,147 (2002 Census); 32,855 (1989 Soviet census), with 23.9% living in Glushkovo.

== Geography ==
Glushkovsky District is in southwest Kursk Oblast, on the border with Ukraine. It is 120 km (75 mi) southwest of the city of Kursk, and 530 km (330 mi) southwest of Moscow. It is bordered on the north by Rylsky District, on the east by Korenevsky District, and on the south and west by Ukraine. The district measures 22 km (14 mi; north-south), and 40 km (25 mi; west-east).

The district lies on the Central Russian Upland; the terrain is a hilly plain averaging 200 meters (660 ft) above sea level. The area is dominated by the meandering floodplain of the Seym river, which runs east to west through the middle of the district on its way to the Desna River and ultimately the Dnieper River. The Seym River floodplain is 2.5–4.0 km (1.6–2.5 mi) wide, and the river valley is 7–12 km (4.3–7.5 mi) wide; the southern side is flatter.

There are two urban-type settlements, Glushkovo and Tyotkino. Glushkovo is the administrative center.

== History ==
On 14 August 2024, during the Russo-Ukrainian War, the Russian government announced the evacuation of Glushkovsky District, due to the large Ukrainian military attack into Kursk on 6 August. On 16 August, the major road bridge over the Seym river was destroyed by the Ukrainian military. The loss of the bridge could hinder the relocation via land routes of the approximately 20,000 civilians in the district.
