= Timsky District =

Timsky District Тимский район
- District
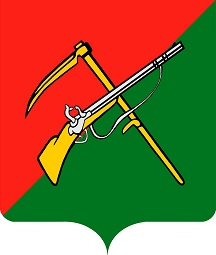
- Coat of arms
- Location of Timsky District in Kursk Oblast
- Coordinates: 51°37′17″N 37°07′24″E
- Country: Russia
- Federal subject: Kursk Oblast
- Administrative center: Tim

Area
  - Total: 882 km^{2} (341 sq mi)

Population (2010 Census)
  - Total: 11,759
  - Density: 13.3/km^{2} (34.5/sq mi)
  - Urban: 27.1%
  - Rural: 72.9%

Administrative structure
  - Administrative divisions: 1 Work settlements, 13 Selsoviets
  - Inhabited localities: 1 urban-type settlements, 66 rural localities

Municipal structure
  - Municipally incorporated as: Timsky Municipal District
  - Municipal divisions: 1 urban settlements, 8 rural settlements
- Time zone: UTC+3 (MSK)
- OKTMO ID: 38642000
- Website: http://timr.rkursk.ru/

Timsky District (Russian: Ти́мский райо́н) is an administrative and municipal district (raion), one of the twenty-eight in Kursk Oblast, Russia. It is located in the east of the oblast. The area of the district is 882 square kilometers (341 sq mi). Its administrative center is the urban locality (a work settlement) of Tim. Population: 10,208 (2021 Census); 11,759 (2010 Census); 14,628 (2002 Census); 16,278 (1989 Soviet census). The population of Tim accounts for 30.0% of the district's total population.
