= Sovetsky District, Kursk Oblast =

Sovetsky District Советский район (Russian)
- District
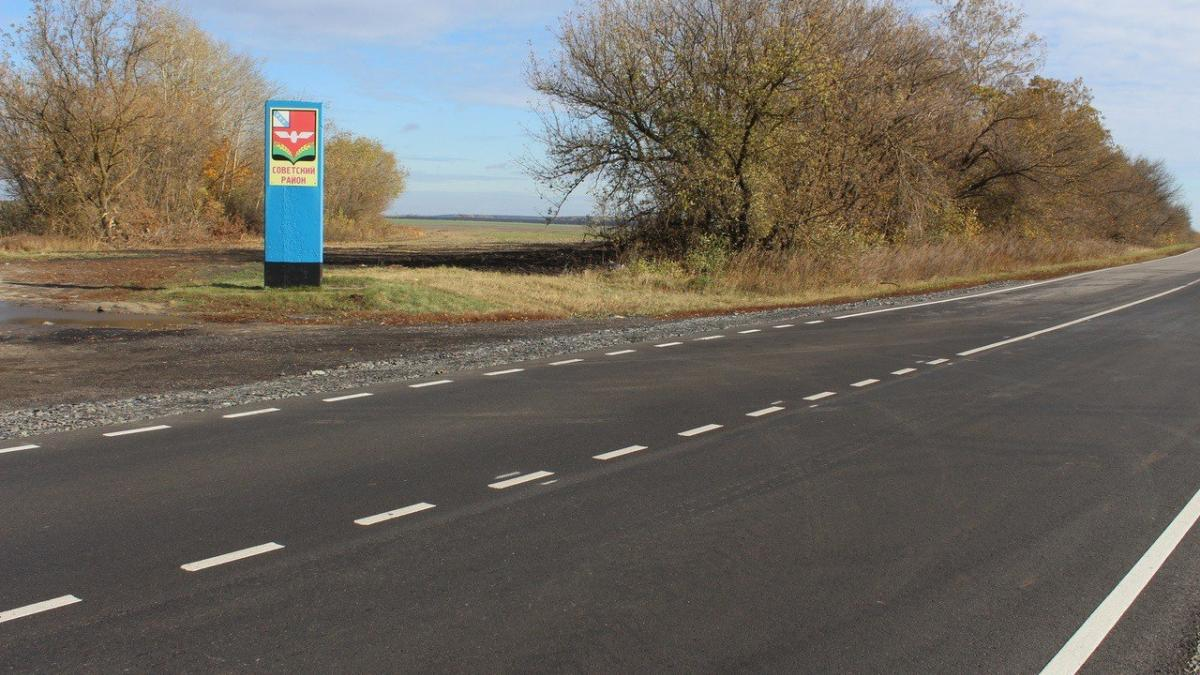

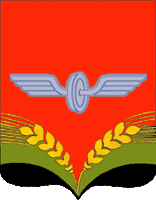
- Coat of arms
- Location of Sovetsky District in Kursk Oblast
- Coordinates: 51°50′28″N 37°43′07″E
- Country: Russia
- Federal subject: Kursk Oblast
- Established: 1928
- Administrative center: Kshensky

Area
  - Total: 1,150 km^{2} (440 sq mi)

Population (2010 Census)
  - Total: 19,080
  - Density: 16.6/km^{2} (43.0/sq mi)
  - Urban: 32.1%
  - Rural: 67.9%

Administrative structure
  - Administrative divisions: 1 Work settlements, 18 Selsoviets
  - Inhabited localities: 1 urban-type settlements, 117 rural localities

Municipal structure
  - Municipally incorporated as: Sovetsky Municipal District
  - Municipal divisions: 1 urban settlements, 10 rural settlements
- Time zone: UTC+3 (MSK)
- OKTMO ID: 38636000
- Website: http://sovetskiyr.rkursk.ru/

Sovetsky District (Russian: Сове́тский райо́н) is an administrative and municipal district (raion), one of the twenty-eight in Kursk Oblast, Russia. It is located in the west of the oblast. The area of the district is 1,150 square kilometers (440 sq mi). Its administrative center is the urban locality (a work settlement) of Kshensky. Population: 16,348 (2021 census); 19,080 (2010 census); 23,673 (2002 Census); 28,252 (1989 Soviet census). The population of Kshensky accounts for 34.2% of the district's total population.
