= Zheleznogorsk, Kursk Oblast =

Town in Kursk Oblast, Russia

Zheleznogorsk Железногорск
- Town
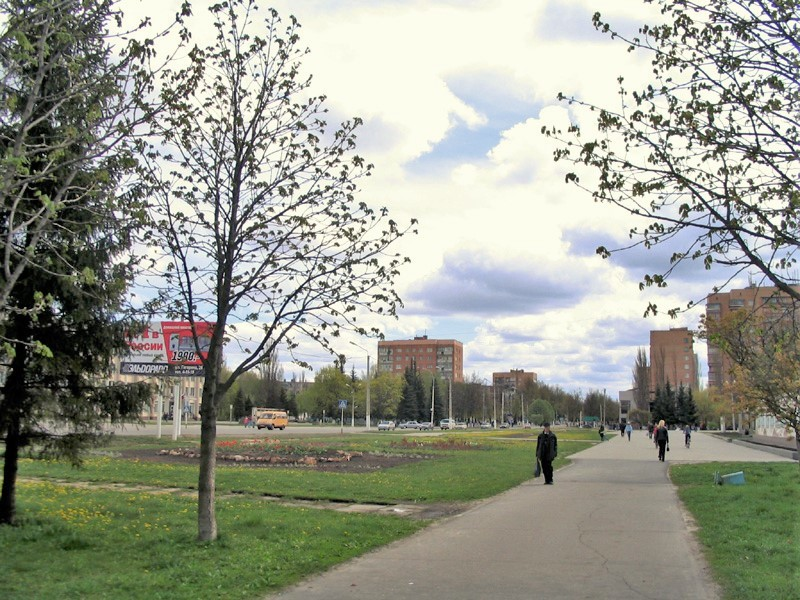
- Lenina Street in Zheleznogorsk

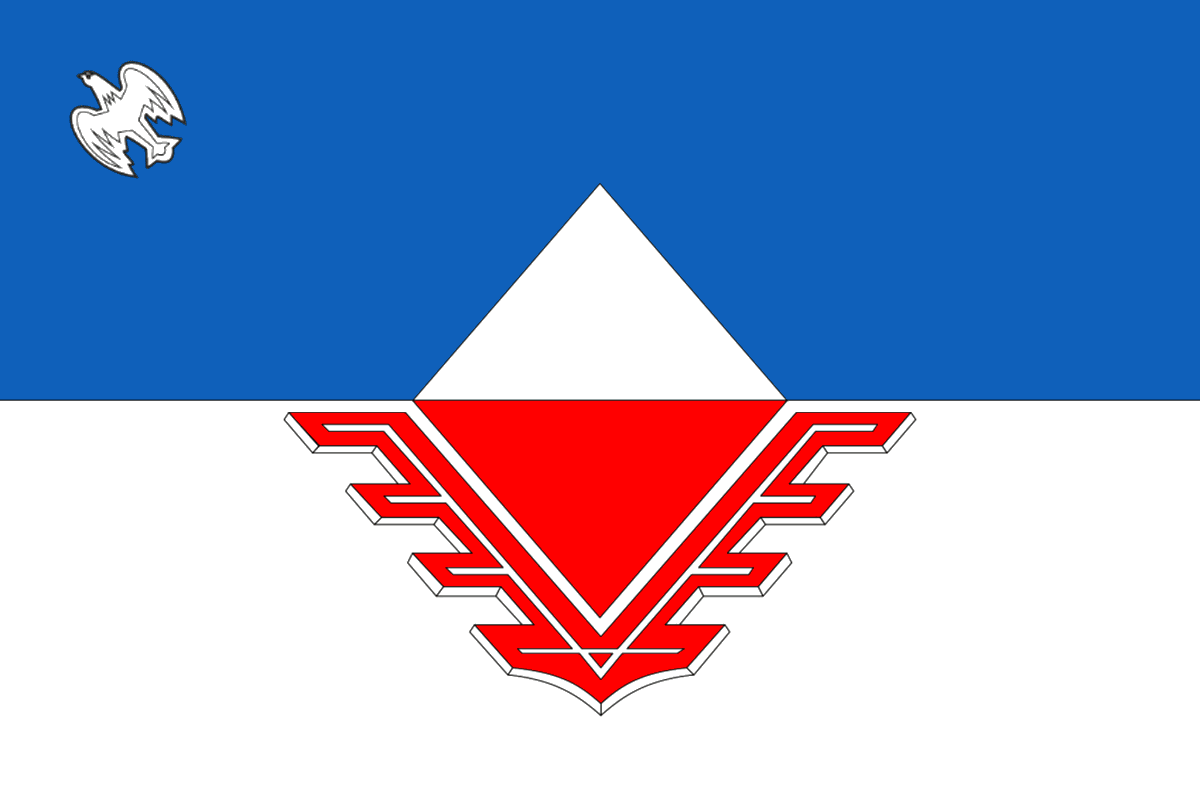
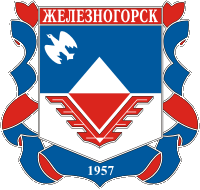
- Flag Coat of arms
- Interactive map of Zheleznogorsk
- Location of Zheleznogorsk Zheleznogorsk (Russia)
- Coordinates: 52°20′N 35°22′E
- Country: Russia
- Federal subject: Kursk Oblast
- Founded: 1957
- Town status since: 1962
- Elevation: 220 m (720 ft)

Population (2010 Census)
  - Total: 95,049
  - Estimate (2025): 94,959 (−0.1%)
  - Rank: 181st in 2010

Administrative status
  - Subordinated to: town of oblast significance of Zheleznogorsk
  - Capital of: Zheleznogorsky District, town of oblast significance of Zheleznogorsk

Municipal status
  - Urban okrug: Zheleznogorsk Urban Okrug
  - Capital of: Zheleznogorsk Urban Okrug, Zheleznogorsky Municipal District
- Time zone: UTC+3 (MSK)
- Postal code: 307170–307179
- OKTMO ID: 38705000001
- Website: feradmin.rkursk.ru

Zheleznogorsk (Russian: Железного́рск) is a town in Kursk Oblast, Russia, located 130 kilometers (81 mi) northwest of Kursk. Its population according to censuses taken in varying years is: 97,038 (2021 census); 95,049 (2010 census); 95,528 (2002 census); 85,192 (1989 Soviet census).

== History ==
Zheleznogorsk was founded in 1957 due to the development of iron ore deposits in the Kursk Magnetic Anomaly. It was granted town status in 1962.

== Administrative and municipal status ==
Within the framework of administrative divisions, Zheleznogorsk serves as the administrative center of Zheleznogorsky District, even though it is not a part of it. As an administrative division, it is incorporated separately as the town of oblast significance of Zheleznogorsk—an administrative unit with the status equal to that of the districts. As a municipal division, the town of oblast significance of Zheleznogorsk is incorporated as Zheleznogorsk Urban Okrug. Basis of Zheleznogorsk economy is manufacturing. There are located 18 big industrial factories, the biggest among them is Mikhailovsky Mining and Refining Facility. In 2015 it produced 18% of total mining production in Russia.
