= Kastorensky District =

Kastorensky District Касторенский район (Russian)
- District
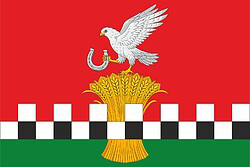
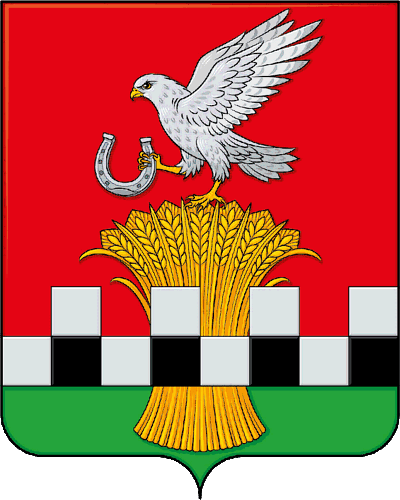
- Flag Coat of arms
- Location of Kastorensky District in Kursk Oblast
- Coordinates: 51°49′00″N 38°08′00″E
- Country: Russia
- Federal subject: Kursk Oblast
- Established: 13 June 1934
- Administrative center: Kastornoye

Area
  - Total: 1,225 km^{2} (473 sq mi)

Population (2010 Census)
  - Total: 18,195
  - Density: 14.85/km^{2} (38.47/sq mi)
  - Urban: 46.6%
  - Rural: 53.4%

Administrative structure
  - Administrative divisions: 3 Work settlements, 21 Selsoviets
  - Inhabited localities: 3 urban-type settlements, 101 rural localities

Municipal structure
  - Municipally incorporated as: Kastorensky Municipal District
  - Municipal divisions: 3 urban settlements, 13 rural settlements
- Time zone: UTC+3 (MSK)
- OKTMO ID: 38614000
- Website: http://kastor.rkursk.ru/

Kastorensky District (Russian: Касто́ренский райо́н) is an administrative and municipal district (raion), one of the twenty-eight in Kursk Oblast, Russia. It is located in the east of the oblast. The area of the district is 1,225 square kilometers (473 sq mi). Its administrative center is the urban locality (a work settlement) of Kastornoye. Population: 14,333 (2021 census); 18,195 (2010 census); 24,237 (2002 Census); 29,127 (1989 Soviet census). The population of Kastornoye accounts for 24.1% of the district's total population.

== Geography ==
Kastorensky District is located in the east of Kursk Oblast, on the border with Voronezh to the east and Lipetsk Oblast to the north. The terrain is hilly plain averaging 200 meters above sea level; the district lies on the Central Russian Upland. The main river in the district is the Veduga River, which has its source in the district, and is ultimately a feeder to the Don River (Russia) basin. The district is 110 km east of the city of Kursk, 45 km west of the city of Voronezh, and 440 km south of Moscow. The area measures 30 km (north-south), and 40 km (west-east). The administrative center is the town of Kastornoye.

The district is bordered on the north by Volovsky District, Lipetsk Oblast, on the east by Semiluksky District of Voronezh Oblast, on the south by Gorshechensky District, and on the west by Sovetsky District.
