= Pristensky District =

Pristensky District Пристенский район (Russian)
- District
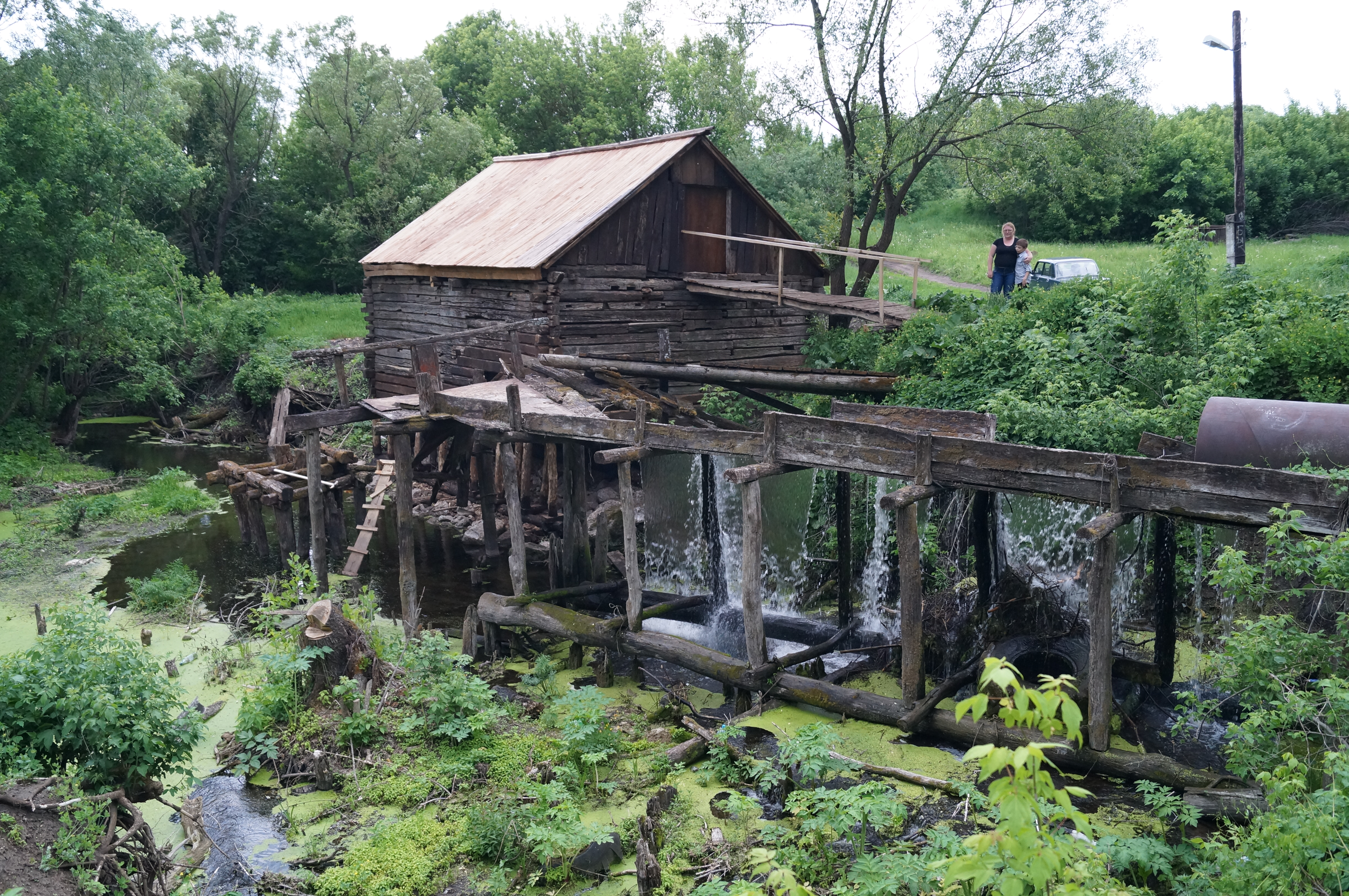
- Water mill in Krasnikovo, Pristensky District

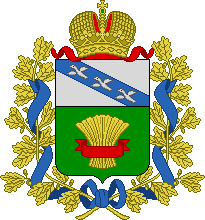
- Coat of arms
- Location of Pristensky District in Kursk Oblast
- Coordinates: 51°14′02″N 36°41′53″E
- Country: Russia
- Federal subject: Kursk Oblast
- Administrative center: Pristen

Area
  - Total: 696 km^{2} (269 sq mi)

Population (2010 Census)
  - Total: 16,893
  - Density: 24.3/km^{2} (62.9/sq mi)
  - Urban: 47.8%
  - Rural: 52.2

Administrative structure
  - Administrative divisions: 2 Work settlements, 18 Selsoviets
  - Inhabited localities: 2 urban-type settlements, 68 rural localities

Municipal structure
  - Municipally incorporated as: Pristensky Municipal District
  - Municipal divisions: 2 urban settlements, 8 rural settlements
- Time zone: UTC+3 (MSK)
- OKTMO ID: 38632000
- Website: http://pristen.rkursk.ru/

Pristensky District (Russian: Пристенский райо́н) is an administrative and municipal district (raion), one of the twenty-eight in Kursk Oblast, Russia. It is located in the south of the oblast. The area of the district is 696 square kilometers (269 sq mi). Its administrative center is the urban locality (a work settlement) of Pristen. Population: 14,326 (2021 census); 16,893 (2010 census); 21,249 (2002 Census); 4,935 (1989 Soviet census). The population of Pristen accounts for 34.3% of the district's total population.
