= Rylsky District =

Rylsky District Рыльский район (Russian)
- District
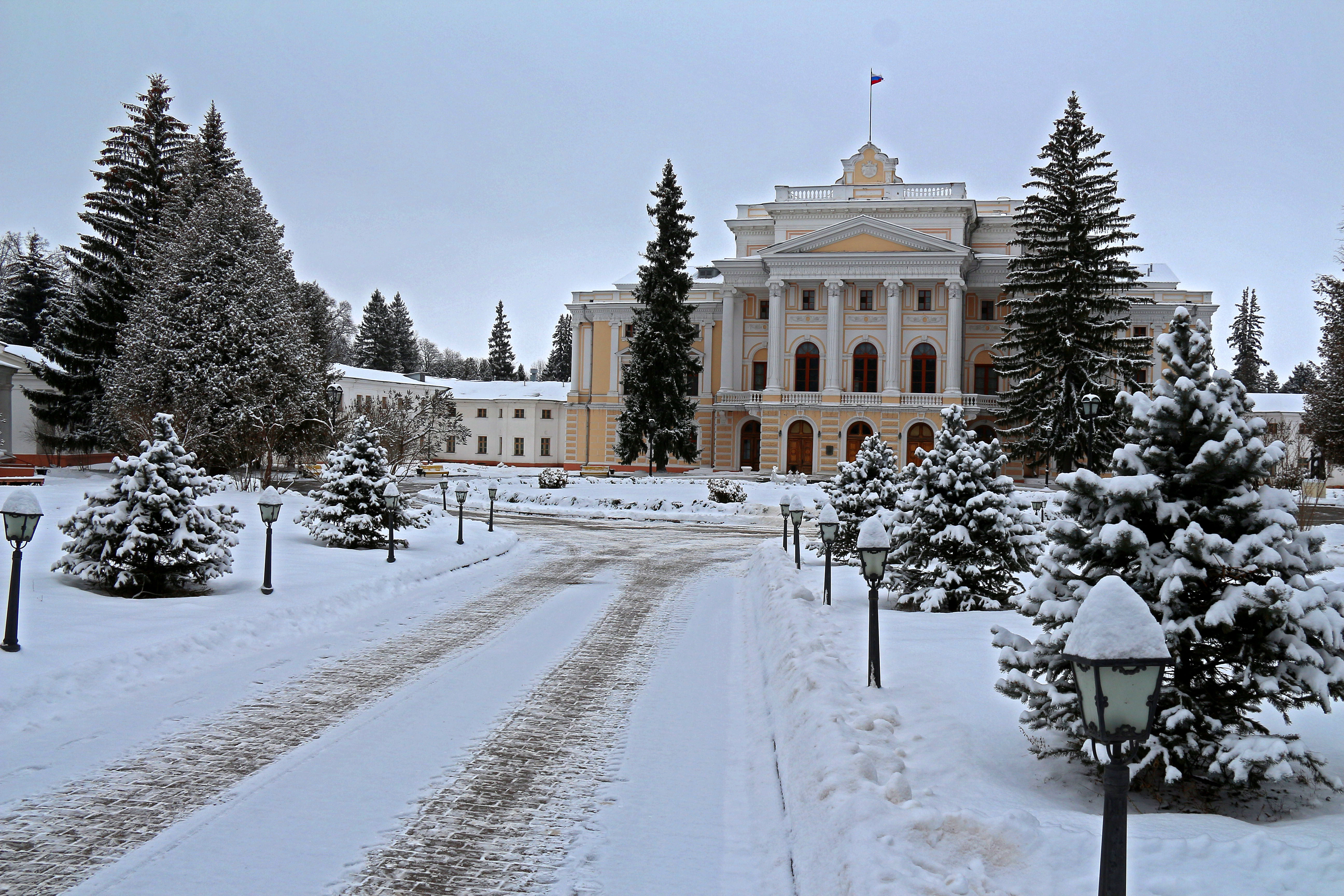
- The Maryino Estate is located in this district

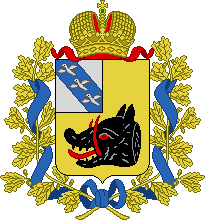
- Coat of arms
- Location of Rylsky District in Kursk Oblast
- Coordinates: 51°34′N 34°41′E
- Country: Russia
- Federal subject: Kursk Oblast
- Administrative center: Rylsk

Area
  - Total: 1,505.02 km^{2} (581.09 sq mi)

Population (2010 Census)
  - Total: 33,158
  - Density: 22.032/km^{2} (57.062/sq mi)
  - Urban: 47.3%
  - Rural: 52.7%

Administrative structure
  - Administrative divisions: 1 Towns of district significance, 27 Selsoviets
  - Inhabited localities: 1 cities/towns, 131 rural localities

Municipal structure
  - Municipally incorporated as: Rylsky Municipal District
  - Municipal divisions: 1 urban settlements, 16 rural settlements
- Time zone: UTC+3 (MSK)
- OKTMO ID: 38634000
- Website: http://www.rylskraion.ru/

Rylsky District (Russian: Ры́льский райо́н) is an administrative and municipal district (raion), one of the twenty-eight in Kursk Oblast, Russia. It is located in the west of the oblast. The area of the district is 1,505.02 square kilometers (581.09 sq mi). Its administrative center is the town of Rylsk. Population: 29,859 (2021 census); 33,158 (2010 census); 40,714 (2002 Census); 47,012 (1989 Soviet census). The population of Rylsk accounts for 50.5% of the district's total population.
