= Zheleznogorsky District =

Zheleznogorsky District Железногорский район (Russian)
- District
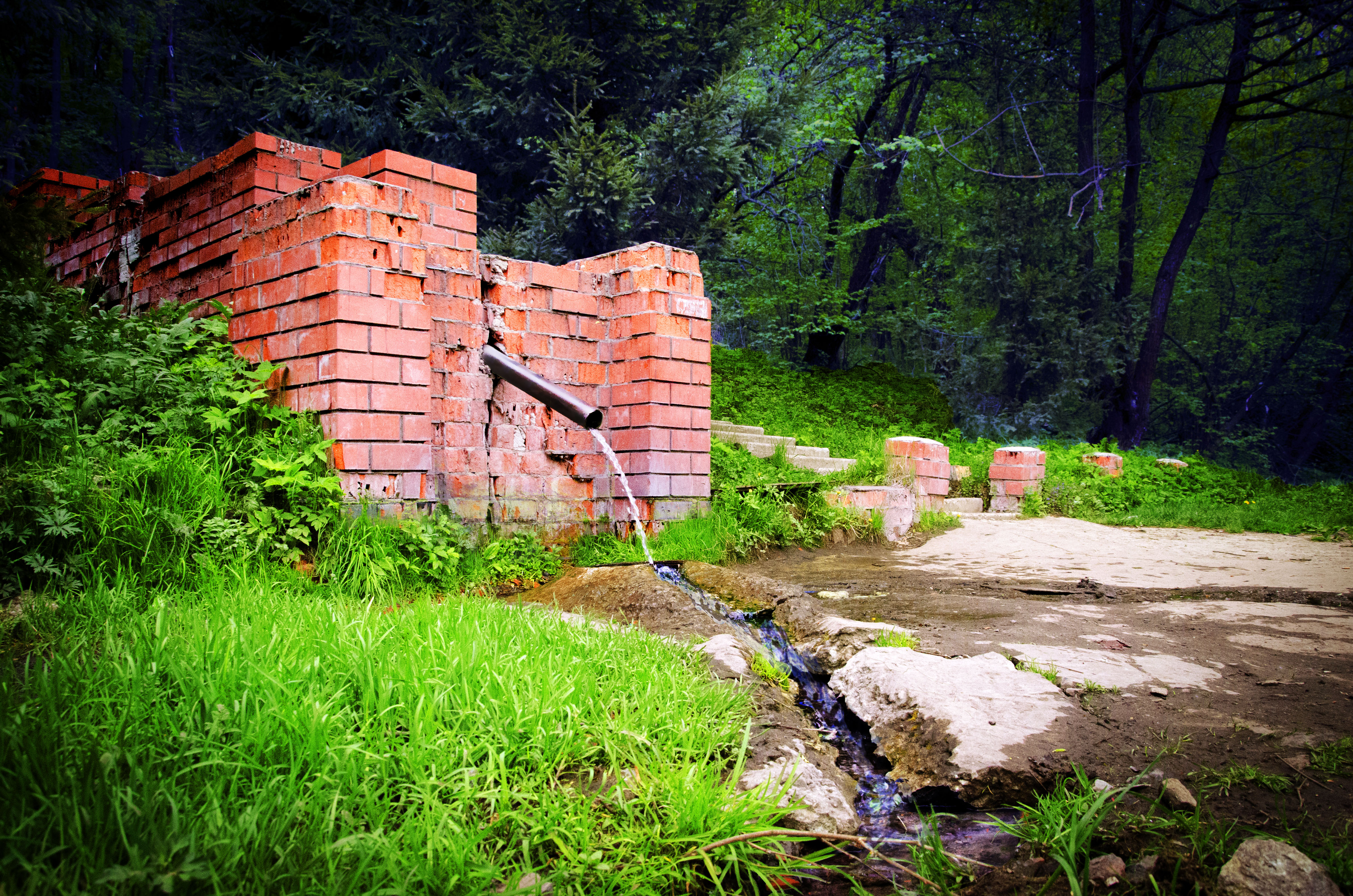
- Artesian spring, Zheleznogorsky District

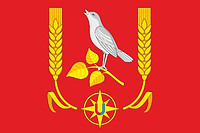
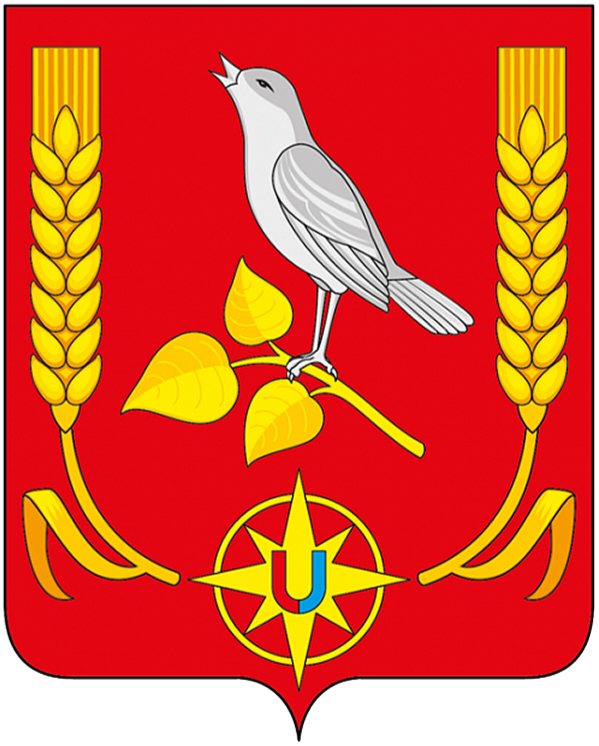
- Flag Coat of arms
- Location of Zheleznogorsky District in Kursk Oblast
- Coordinates: 52°20′N 35°22′E
- Country: Russia
- Federal subject: Kursk Oblast
- Established: 30 July 1928
- Administrative center: Zheleznogorsk

Area
  - Total: 991 km^{2} (383 sq mi)

Population (2010 Census)
  - Total: 16,289
  - Density: 16.4/km^{2} (42.6/sq mi)
  - Urban: 12.1%
  - Rural: 87.9%

Administrative structure
  - Administrative divisions: 1 Work settlements, 18 Selsoviets
  - Inhabited localities: 1 urban-type settlements, 110 rural localities

Municipal structure
  - Municipally incorporated as: Zheleznogorsky Municipal District
  - Municipal divisions: 1 urban settlements, 17 rural settlements
- Time zone: UTC+3 (MSK)
- OKTMO ID: 38610000
- Website: http://zhel.rkursk.ru/

Zheleznogorsky District (Russian: Железного́рский райо́н) is an administrative and municipal district (raion), one of the twenty-eight in Kursk Oblast, Russia. It is located in the north of the oblast. The area of the district is 991 square kilometers (383 sq mi). Its administrative center is the town of Zheleznogorsk (which is not administratively a part of the district). Population: 15,478 (2021 census); 16,289 (2010 census); 18,192 (2002 Census); 19,571 (1989 Soviet census).

== Geography ==
Zheleznogorsky District is located in the northwest of Kursk Oblast, on the border with Oryol Oblast to the north. The terrain is hilly plain averaging 200 meters above sea level; the district lies on the Orel-Kursk plateau of the Central Russian Upland. The main river in the district is the Svapa River, which flows to the west through the district; it is a tributary in the Dniepr River basin. The district is 50 km southwest of the city of Kursk, and 400 km southwest of Moscow. The area measures 40 km (north-south), and 30 km (west-east). The administrative center is the town of Zheleznogorsk.

The district is bordered on the north by Oryol Oblast, on the east by Fatezhsky District, on the south by Konyshyovsky District, and on the west by Dmitriyevsky District.

== Administrative and municipal status ==
Within the framework of administrative divisions, Zheleznogorsky District is one of the twenty-eight in the oblast. The town of Zheleznogorsk serves as its administrative center, despite being incorporated separately as a town of oblast significance—an administrative unit with the status equal to that of the districts.

As a municipal division, the district is incorporated as Zheleznogorsky Municipal District. The town of oblast significance of Zheleznogorsk is incorporated separately from the district as Zheleznogorsk Urban Okrug.
