= Mitrofanovo =

Mitrofanovo (Russian: Митрофаново) is the name of several rural localities in Russia:

- Mitrofanovo, Arkhangelsk Oblast, a village in Khotenovsky Selsoviet of Kargopolsky District in Arkhangelsk Oblast
- Mitrofanovo, Kaluga Oblast, a village in Maloyaroslavetsky District of Kaluga Oblast
- Mitrofanovo, Kemerovo Oblast, a village in Novoromanovskaya Rural Territory of Yurginsky District in Kemerovo Oblast; 55°39′N 85°18′E
- Mitrofanovo, Kiknursky District, Kirov Oblast, a village in Tsekeyevsky Rural Okrug of Kiknursky District in Kirov Oblast; 57°11′N 47°12′E
- Mitrofanovo, Yaransky District, Kirov Oblast, a village in Shkalansky Rural Okrug of Yaransky District in Kirov Oblast; 57°3′N 47°59′E
- Mitrofanovo, Komi Republic, a village in Mitrofan-Dikost Rural-type Settlement Administrative Territory of Troitsko-Pechorsky District in the Komi Republic; 63°12′N 56°3′E
- Mitrofanovo, Kostroma Oblast, a village in Klevantsovskoye Settlement of Ostrovsky District in Kostroma Oblast; 57°49′N 42°14′E
- Mitrofanovo, Nizhny Novgorod Oblast, a village in Fedurinsky Selsoviet of Gorodetsky District in Nizhny Novgorod Oblast; 56°50′N 43°27′E
- Mitrofanovo, Penza Oblast, a selo in Sheremetyevsky Selsoviet of Bashmakovsky District in Penza Oblast
- Mitrofanovo, Vladimir Oblast, a village in Selivanovsky District of Vladimir Oblast
- Mitrofanovo, Vashkinsky District, Vologda Oblast, a village in Vasilyevsky Selsoviet of Vashkinsky District in Vologda Oblast
- Mitrofanovo, Vozhegodsky District, Vologda Oblast, a village in Lipino-Kalikinsky Selsoviet of Vozhegodsky District in Vologda Oblast
- Mitrofanovo, Zabaykalsky Krai, a selo in Shilkinsky District of Zabaykalsky Krai
