= Aeroservis =

Russian airline

Aeroservis Airlines Авиакомпания "Аэроcервис"
- Founded: 2010
- Hubs: Chita Kadala Airport
- Fleet size: 9
- Destinations: 13
- Headquarters: Chita, Russia
- Website: airss.ru

Aeroservis is a regional airline, operating regular flights in Zabaykalsky Krai, Russia, as well as Charter flights. It is based in Kadala Airport, serving Chita.

In October 2019 Aeroservis was acquired by Siberian Light Aviation. As of June 2025, the airline is banned from flying into the EU like all other Russian airlines.

== Fleet ==
Aeroservis operates following fleet:

Aeroservis fleet
| Aircraft | In service | Orders | Passengers | Notes |
|---|---|---|---|---|
| L-410UVP-E20 | 1 | — | | |
| Antonov An-2 | 3 | — | | |
| Mil Mi-8 AMT | 2 | — | | |
| SibNIA TVS-2MS | 3 | — | | |

== Destinations ==
As of January 2025 Aeroservice operates regular flights to the following destinations:

Magadan Oblast

- Magadan - Sokol Airport Secondary base
- Seymchan - Seymchan Airport
- Sinegorye - Sinegorye Airport
- Yagodnoye - Yagodnoe Airport

Zabaykalsky Krai

- Chita - Kadala Airport Base
- Krasny Chikoy - Krasny Chikoy Airport
- Krasny Yar - Krasny Yar Airport
- Kyra - Kyra Airport
- Menza - Menza Airport
- Tungokochen - Tungokochen Airport
- Ust-Karenga - Ust-Karenga Airport
- Usugli - Usugli Airport
- Yumurchen - Yumurchen Airport
