= Solntsevo (inhabited locality) =

Solntsevo (Russian: Со́лнцево) is the name of several inhabited localities in Russia.

Urban localities

- Solntsevo, Kursk Oblast, a work settlement in Solntsevsky District of Kursk Oblast

Rural localities

- Solntsevo, Belgorod Oblast, a selo in Gubkinsky District of Belgorod Oblast
- Solntsevo, Chaplyginsky District, Lipetsk Oblast, a selo in Solovskoy Selsoviet of Chaplyginsky District of Lipetsk Oblast
- Solntsevo, Krasninsky District, Lipetsk Oblast, a village in Sotnikovsky Selsoviet of Krasninsky District of Lipetsk Oblast
- Solntsevo, Omsk Oblast, a village in Krasnoyarsky Rural Okrug of Sherbakulsky District of Omsk Oblast
- Solntsevo, Orlovsky District, Oryol Oblast, a selo in Obraztsovsky Selsoviet of Orlovsky District of Oryol Oblast
- Solntsevo, Uritsky District, Oryol Oblast, a village in Podzavalovsky Selsoviet of Uritsky District of Oryol Oblast
- Solntsevo, Zabaykalsky Krai, a selo in Shilkinsky District of Zabaykalsky Krai

== Historical entities ==
Abolished inhabited localities

- Solntsevo, a former town in Leninsky District of Moscow Oblast; since 1984—a part of the city of Moscow.
