= Uldurga, Zabaykalsky Krai =

Uldurga Ульдурга
- Selo
- Location within Zabaykalsky Krai Location within Russia
- Coordinates: 52°32′N 115°07′E
- Country: Russia
- Region: Zabaykalsky Krai
- District: Tungokochensky District
- Time zone: UTC+9:00

Uldurga (Russian: Ульдурга) is a rural locality (a selo) in Tungokochensky District, Zabaykalsky Krai, Russia. Population: 177 (2021 census); 250 (2010 census); 328 (2002 census); There are 7 streets in this selo.

== Geography ==
This rural locality is located 17 km from Verkh-Usugli (the district's administrative centre), 123 km from Chita (capital of Zabaykalsky Krai) and 5,254 km from Moscow. Usugli is the nearest rural locality.
