= Galkino, Zabaykalsky Krai =

Galkino Галкино
- Selo
- Location within Zabaykalsky Krai Location within Russia
- Coordinates: 51°46′N 115°11′E
- Country: Russia
- Region: Zabaykalsky Krai
- District: Shilkinsky District
- Time zone: UTC+9:00

Galkino (Russian: Галкино) is a rural locality (a selo) in Shilkinsky District, Zabaykalsky Krai, Russia. Population: 534 (2021 census); 624 (2010 census); There are 4 streets in this selo.

== Geography ==
This rural locality is located 59 km from Shilka (the district's administrative centre), 119 km from Chita (capital of Zabaykalsky Krai) and 5,355 km from Moscow. Zubarevo is the nearest rural locality.
