= Ostrovki, Zabaykalsky Krai =

Ostrovki Островки
- Selo
- Location within Zabaykalsky Krai Location within Russia
- Coordinates: 52°04′N 115°59′E
- Country: Russia
- Region: Zabaykalsky Krai
- District: Shilkinsky District
- Time zone: UTC+9:00

Ostrovki (Russian: Островки) is a rural locality (a selo) in Shilkinsky District, Zabaykalsky Krai, Russia. Population: 96 (2021 census); 127 (2010 census); There are 4 streets in this selo.

== Geography ==
This rural locality is located 25 km from Shilka (the district's administrative centre), 170 km from Chita (capital of Zabaykalsky Krai) and 5,372 km from Moscow. Vasilyevka is the nearest rural locality.
