= Kazanovo =

Kazanovo Казаново
- Selo
- Location within Zabaykalsky Krai Location within Russia
- Coordinates: 51°46′N 115°51′E
- Country: Russia
- Region: Zabaykalsky Krai
- District: Shilkinsky District
- Time zone: UTC+9:00

Kazanovo (Russian: Казаново) is a rural locality (a selo) in Shilkinsky District, Zabaykalsky Krai, Russia. Population: 1,815 (2021 census); 2,146 (2010 census); There are 21 streets in this selo.

== Geography ==
This rural locality is located 14 km from Shilka (the district's administrative centre), 165 km from Chita (capital of Zabaykalsky Krai) and 5,402 km from Moscow. Onon is the nearest rural locality.
