= Srednyaya Kiya =

Srednyaya Kiya Средняя Кия
- Selo
- Location within Zabaykalsky Krai Location within Russia
- Coordinates: 51°59′N 115°38′E
- Country: Russia
- Region: Zabaykalsky Krai
- District: Shilkinsky District
- Time zone: UTC+9:00

Srednyaya Kiya (Russian: Средняя Кия) is a rural locality (a selo) in Shilkinsky District, Zabaykalsky Krai, Russia. Population: 297 (2010 census); 357 (2002 census); There are 6 streets in this selo.

== Geography ==
This rural locality is located 31 km from Shilka (the district's administrative centre), 147 km from Chita (capital of Zabaykalsky Krai) and 5,359 km from Moscow. Bogomyagkovo is the nearest rural locality.
