= Verkhnyaya Khila =

Verkhnyaya Khila Верхняя Хила
- Selo
- Location within Zabaykalsky Krai Location within Russia
- Coordinates: 52°05′N 115°53′E
- Country: Russia
- Region: Zabaykalsky Krai
- District: Shilkinsky District
- Time zone: UTC+9:00

Verkhnyaya Khila (Russian: Верхняя Хила) is a rural locality (a selo) in Shilkinsky District, Zabaykalsky Krai, Russia. Population: 796 (2010 census); 884 (2002 census); There are 11 streets in this selo.

== Geography ==
This rural locality is located 28 km from Shilka (the district's administrative centre), 163 km from Chita (capital of Zabaykalsky Krai) and 5,363 km from Moscow. Ostrovki is the nearest rural locality.
