= Shivanda =

Shivanda Шиванда
- Selo
- Location within Zabaykalsky Krai Location within Russia
- Coordinates: 51°43′N 115°34′E
- Country: Russia
- Region: Zabaykalsky Krai
- District: Shilkinsky District
- Time zone: UTC+9:00

Shivanda (Russian: Шиванда) is a rural locality (a selo) in Shilkinsky District, Zabaykalsky Krai, Russia. Population: 99 (2021 census); 106 (2010 census); There are 7 streets in this selo.

== Geography ==
This rural locality is located 35 km from Shilka (the district's administrative centre), 147 km from Chita (capital of Zabaykalsky Krai) and 5,388 km from Moscow. Krasnoyarovo is the nearest rural locality.
