= Solntsevo =

Solntsevo may refer to:

- Solntsevo (inhabited locality), several inhabited localities in Russia
- Solntsevo District, a district in Western Administrative Okrug of Moscow, Russia
- Solntsevo (locomotive depot), a future depot of Sokolnicheskaya Line of the Moscow Metro
- Solntsevo (Moscow Metro), a planned station of Kalininsko-Solntsevskaya Line of the Moscow Metro

== See also ==
- Solntsevsky District, a district of Kursk Oblast, Russia
- Solntsevsky District, Moscow, a district of the city of Moscow in 1984—1991
