= Vasilyevka, Zabaykalsky Krai =

Vasilyevka Васильевка
- Selo
- Location within Zabaykalsky Krai Location within Russia
- Coordinates: 52°01′N 115°56′E
- Country: Russia
- Region: Zabaykalsky Krai
- District: Shilkinsky District
- Time zone: UTC+9:00

Vasilyevka (Russian: Васильевка) is a rural locality (a selo) in Shilkinsky District, Zabaykalsky Krai, Russia. Population: 103 (2021 census); 122 (2010 census); There are 4 streets in this selo.

== Geography ==
This rural locality is located 21 km from Shilka (the district's administrative centre), 167 km from Chita (capital of Zabaykalsky Krai) and 5,375 km from Moscow. Ostrovki is the nearest rural locality.
