= Zelyonoye Ozero =

Zelyonoye Ozero Зелёное Озеро
- Selo
- Location within Zabaykalsky Krai Location within Russia
- Coordinates: 53°40′N 116°34′E
- Country: Russia
- Region: Zabaykalsky Krai
- District: Tungokochensky District
- Time zone: UTC+9:00

Zelyonoye Ozero (Russian: Зелёное Озеро) is a rural locality (a selo) in Tungokochensky District, Zabaykalsky Krai, Russia. Population: 39 (2021 census); 44 (2010 census); There are 3 streets in this selo.

== Geography ==
This rural locality is located 143 km from Verkh-Usugli (the district's administrative centre), 273 km from Chita (capital of Zabaykalsky Krai) and 5,206 km from Moscow.
