= Savvino =

Savvino Саввино
- Selo
- Location within Zabaykalsky Krai Location within Russia
- Coordinates: 51°45′N 115°05′E
- Country: Russia
- Region: Zabaykalsky Krai
- District: Shilkinsky District
- Time zone: UTC+9:00

Savvino (Russian: Саввино) is a rural locality (a selo) in Shilkinsky District, Zabaykalsky Krai, Russia. Population: 250 (2021 census); 290 (2010 census); There are 3 streets in this selo.

== Geography ==
This rural locality is located 66 km from Shilka (the district's administrative centre), 113 km from Chita (capital of Zabaykalsky Krai) and 5,350 km from Moscow. Galkino is the nearest rural locality.
