= Chiron, Zabaykalsky Krai =

Chiron Чирон
- Selo
- Location within Zabaykalsky Krai Location within Russia
- Coordinates: 51°37′N 115°46′E
- Country: Russia
- Region: Zabaykalsky Krai
- District: Shilkinsky District
- Time zone: UTC+9:00

Chiron (Russian: Чирон) is a rural locality (a selo) in Shilkinsky District, Zabaykalsky Krai, Russia. Population: 880 (2010 census); 1,088 (2002 census); There are 12 streets in this selo.

== Geography ==
This rural locality is located 30 km from Shilka (the district's administrative centre), 164 km from Chita (capital of Zabaykalsky Krai) and 5,415 km from Moscow. Kirocha is the nearest rural locality.
