= Ust-Nozhovaya =

Ust-Nozhovaya Усть-Ножовая
- Selo
- Location within Zabaykalsky Krai Location within Russia
- Coordinates: 51°27′N 115°46′E
- Country: Russia
- Region: Zabaykalsky Krai
- District: Shilkinsky District
- Time zone: UTC+9:00

Ust-Nozhovaya (Russian: Усть-Ножовая) is a rural locality (a selo) in Shilkinsky District, Zabaykalsky Krai, Russia. Population: 281 (2021 census); 350 (2010 census); There are 3 streets in this selo.

== Geography ==
This rural locality is located 46 km from Shilka (the district's administrative centre), 169 km from Chita (capital of Zabaykalsky Krai) and 5,434 km from Moscow. Ust-Aga is the nearest rural locality.
