= Bogomyagkovo =

Bogomyagkovo Богомягково
- Selo
- Location within Zabaykalsky Krai Location within Russia
- Coordinates: 51°59′N 115°47′E
- Country: Russia
- Region: Zabaykalsky Krai
- District: Shilkinsky District
- Time zone: UTC+9:00

Bogomyagkovo (Russian: Богомягково) is a rural locality (a selo) in Shilkinsky District, Zabaykalsky Krai, Russia. Population: 463 (2021 census); 520 (2010 census); There are 13 streets in this selo.

== Geography ==
This rural locality is located 23 km from Shilka (the district's administrative centre), 158 km from Chita (capital of Zabaykalsky Krai) and 5,370 km from Moscow. Ulyanovka is the nearest rural locality.
