= Akima, Zabaykalsky Krai =

Akima Акима
- Selo
- Location within Zabaykalsky Krai Location within Russia
- Coordinates: 53°03′N 115°44′E
- Country: Russia
- Region: Zabaykalsky Krai
- District: Tungokochensky District
- Time zone: UTC+9:00

Akima (Russian: Акима) is a rural locality (a selo) in Tungokochensky District, Zabaykalsky Krai, Russia. Population: 221 (2021 census); 233 (2010 census); 285 (2002 census); There are 7 streets in this selo.

== Geography ==
This rural locality is located 55 km from Verkh-Usugli (the district's administrative centre), 187 km from Chita (capital of Zabaykalsky Krai) and 5,230 km from Moscow. Kyker is the nearest rural locality.
