= Kyker =

Kyker Кыкер
- Selo
- Location within Zabaykalsky Krai Location within Russia
- Coordinates: 53°10′N 115°49′E
- Country: Russia
- Region: Zabaykalsky Krai
- District: Tungokochensky District
- Time zone: UTC+9:00

Kyker (Russian: Кыкер) is a rural locality (a selo) in Tungokochensky District, Zabaykalsky Krai, Russia. Population: 362 (2021 census); 440 (2010 census); 574 (2002 census); There are 4 streets in this selo.

== Geography ==
This rural locality is located 69 km from Verkh-Usugli (the district's administrative centre), 200 km from Chita (capital of Zabaykalsky Krai) and 5,221 km from Moscow. Akima is the nearest rural locality.
