= Onon, Zabaykalsky Krai =

Onon Онон
- Settlement
- Location within Zabaykalsky Krai Location within Russia
- Coordinates: 51°42′N 115°48′E
- Country: Russia
- Region: Zabaykalsky Krai
- District: Shilkinsky District
- Time zone: UTC+9:00

Onon (Russian: Онон) is a rural locality (a settlement) in Shilkinsky District, Zabaykalsky Krai, Russia. Population: 59 (2021 census); 57 (2010 census); There are 2 streets in this settlement.

== Geography ==
This rural locality is located 22 km from Shilka (the district's administrative centre), 163 km from Chita (capital of Zabaykalsky Krai) and 5,405 km from Moscow. Kazanovo is the nearest rural locality.
