= Makarovo, Zabaykalsky Krai =

Makarovo Макарово
- Selo
- Location within Zabaykalsky Krai Location within Russia
- Coordinates: 51°29′N 116°00′E
- Country: Russia
- Region: Zabaykalsky Krai
- District: Shilkinsky District
- Time zone: UTC+9:00

Makarovo (Russian: Макарово) is a rural locality (a selo) in Shilkinsky District, Zabaykalsky Krai, Russia. Population: 59 (2010 census); There are 2 streets in this selo.

== Geography ==
This rural locality is located 40 km from Shilka (the district's administrative centre), 184 km from Chita (capital of Zabaykalsky Krai) and 5,449 km from Moscow. Ononskoye is the nearest rural locality.
