= Nizhny Stan, Tungokochensky District, Zabaykalsky Krai =

Nizhny Stan Нижний Стан
- Selo
- Location within Zabaykalsky Krai Location within Russia
- Coordinates: 52°17′N 115°42′E
- Country: Russia
- Region: Zabaykalsky Krai
- District: Tungokochensky District
- Time zone: UTC+9:00

Nizhny Stan (Russian: Нижний Стан) is a rural locality (a selo) in Tungokochensky District, Zabaykalsky Krai, Russia. Population: 590 (2021 census); 645 (2010 census); 695 (2002 census); There are 8 streets in this selo.

== Geography ==
This rural locality is located 56 km from Verkh-Usugli (the district's administrative centre), 153 km from Chita (capital of Zabaykalsky Krai) and 5,325 km from Moscow. Tsagakshino is the nearest rural locality.
