= Unenker =

Unenker Уненкер
- Selo
- Location within Zabaykalsky Krai Location within Russia
- Coordinates: 51°46′N 115°21′E
- Country: Russia
- Region: Zabaykalsky Krai
- District: Shilkinsky District
- Time zone: UTC+9:00

Unenker (Russian: Уненкер) is a rural locality (a selo) in Shilkinsky District, Zabaykalsky Krai, Russia. Population: 170 (2010 census); 244 (2002 census); There are 4 streets in this selo.

== Geography ==
This rural locality is located 47 km from Shilka (the district's administrative centre), 131 km from Chita (capital of Zabaykalsky Krai) and 5,367 km from Moscow. Zubarevo is the nearest rural locality.
