= September 12 =

September 12 this year in various calendars
- Saturday, 12 September 2026
| Akan | Kwamemene |
| Armenian | 24 Hoṙi 1476 |
| Aztec | Tititl 5, 12 Ācatl |
| Babylonian | 29 Abu, 2337 SE |
| Balinese pawukon | Menga, Beteng, Jaya, Paing, Was, Saniscara of Menail, Kala, Ogan, Dewa |
| Bengali | 28 Bhadro, BS 1433 |
| Chinese | Yin Earth Ox・Willow Mansion; Fire Horse Year, Month 8, Day 2 (Bailu, 11 days until Qiufen) |
| Common Era | 12 September 2026 CE |
| Coptic | 2 Thout, AM 1743 |
| Egyptian | 29 Tybi, 2775 NE |
| Ethiopian | 2 Maskaram, 2019 Amätä Məhrät |
| French Republican | Décade III, Sextidi de Fructidor de l'Année 234 de la République |
| Gregorian | 12 September, AD 2026 |
| Hebrew | 1 Tishrei, AM 5787 |
| Hindu | Uttaraphalgunī・Śubha; Solar: 27 Bhādrapada, 1948 SE; Lunisolar: Pratipada, Śukla pakṣa of Bhādrapada, 2083 VE; Rāudra・5127 KY・1,872,830 |
| Icelandic | Laugardagur, 19 Tvímánuður 2026 |
| Islamic | 29 Rabi' al-awwal, AH 1448 (using tabular method) |
| ISO week date | 2026-W37-6 |
| Japanese | 2 Hazuki, Reiwa 8 (Hakuro, 11 days until Shūbun) |
| Julian | 30 August, AD 2026 (AM 7534) |
| Julian day | 2461296 |
| Korean | 2 Dakdal, 4359 DE |
| Maya | 13.0.13.16.13; 6 Chen, 12 Ben |
| Roman | ante diem III Kalendas Septembres, MMDCCLXXIX AUC |
| Solar Hijri | 21 Shahrivar, SH 1405 |
| Tibetan | 1 khrums, me pho rta 2153 or 1772 or 1000 |

| << | September | | | | | >> |
| Su | Mo | Tu | We | Th | Fr | Sa |
| | | 1 | 2 | 3 | 4 | 5 |
| 6 | 7 | 8 | 9 | 10 | 11 | 12 |
| 13 | 14 | 15 | 16 | 17 | 18 | 19 |
| 20 | 21 | 22 | 23 | 24 | 25 | 26 |
| 27 | 28 | 29 | 30 |
2026

September 12 in recent years
2026 (Saturday)
2025 (Friday)
2024 (Thursday)
2023 (Tuesday)
2022 (Monday)
2021 (Sunday)
2020 (Saturday)
2019 (Thursday)
2018 (Wednesday)
2017 (Tuesday)

September 12 is the 255th day of the year (256th in leap years) in the Gregorian calendar; 110 days remain until the end of the year.

== Events ==
=== Pre-1600 ===
- 490 BC – Battle of Marathon: The conventionally accepted date for the Battle of Marathon. The Athenians and their Plataean allies defeat the first Persian invasion force of Greece.
- 372 – Sixteen Kingdoms: Sima Yao, age 10, succeeds his father Emperor Jianwen as Emperor Xiaowu of the Eastern Jin dynasty.
- 1185 – Isaac Angelos is crowned Byzantine emperor following the deposition of Andronikos I Komnenos and after the crowd rejects the coronation of Isaac's uncle John Doukas.
- 1213 – Albigensian Crusade: Simon de Montfort, 5th Earl of Leicester, defeats Peter II of Aragon at the Battle of Muret.
- 1229 – Battle of Portopí: The Aragonese army under the command of James I of Aragon disembarks at Santa Ponça, Mallorca, with the purpose of conquering the island.
- 1297 – The Treaty of Alcañices, mediated by the pope, between the king Denis of Portugal and king Ferdinand IV of Castile defines the border between the two countries and establishes an alliance of friendship.
- 1309 – The first siege of Gibraltar takes place in the context of the Spanish Reconquista, pitting the forces of the Kingdom of Castile against the Emirate of Granada and resulting in a Castilian victory.

=== 1601–1900 ===
- 1609 – Henry Hudson begins his exploration of the Hudson River while aboard the Halve Maen.
- 1634 – A gunpowder factory explodes in Valletta, Malta, killing 22 people and damaging several buildings.
- 1683 – Austro-Ottoman War: Battle of Vienna: Several European armies join forces to defeat the Ottoman Empire.
- 1723 – Iran and Russia sign the treaty of Saint Petersburg. Iran is forced to cede all lands on the western and southern coast of the Caspian Sea and Russia pledges to provide military support against the Ottoman Empire.
- 1814 – Battle of North Point: an American detachment halts the British land advance to Baltimore in the War of 1812.
- 1847 – Mexican–American War: the Battle of Chapultepec begins.
- 1848 – A new constitution marks the establishment of Switzerland as a federal state.
- 1857 – The SS Central America sinks about 160 miles east of Cape Hatteras, North Carolina, drowning a total of 426 passengers and crew, including Captain William Lewis Herndon. The ship was carrying 13–15 tons of gold from the California gold rush.
- 1885 – Arbroath 36–0 Bon Accord, a world record scoreline in professional association football.
- 1890 – Salisbury, Rhodesia, is founded.
- 1897 – Tirah campaign: In the Battle of Saragarhi, ten thousand Pashtun tribesmen suffer several hundred casualties while attacking 21 Sikh soldiers in British service.

=== 1901–present ===
- 1906 – The Newport Transporter Bridge is opened in Newport, South Wales by Godfrey Morgan, 1st Viscount Tredegar.
- 1910 – Premiere performance of Gustav Mahler's Symphony No. 8 in Munich (with a chorus of 852 singers and an orchestra of 171 players. Mahler's rehearsal assistant conductor was Bruno Walter).
- 1915 – French soldiers rescue over 4,000 Armenian genocide survivors stranded on Musa Dagh.
- 1923 – Southern Rhodesia, today called Zimbabwe, is annexed by the United Kingdom.
- 1933 – Leó Szilárd, waiting for a red light on Southampton Row in Bloomsbury, conceives the idea of the nuclear chain reaction.
- 1938 – Adolf Hitler demands autonomy and self-determination for the Germans of the Sudetenland region of Czechoslovakia.
- 1940 – Cave paintings are discovered in Lascaux, France.
- 1940 – The Hercules Powder plant disaster in the United States kills 51 people and injures over 200.
- 1942 – World War II: HMT Laconia, carrying civilians, Allied soldiers and Italian POWs is torpedoed off the coast of West Africa and sinks with a heavy loss of life. Main article: Laconia incident
- 1942 – World War II: First day of the Battle of Edson's Ridge during the Guadalcanal Campaign. U.S. Marines protecting Henderson Field are attacked by Imperial Japanese Army troops.
- 1943 – World War II: Benito Mussolini is rescued from house arrest by German commando forces led by Otto Skorzeny.
- 1944 – World War II: The liberation of Yugoslavia from Axis occupation continues. Bajina Bašta in western Serbia is among the liberated cities.
- 1953 – U.S. Senator and future President John Fitzgerald Kennedy marries Jacqueline Lee Bouvier at St. Mary's Church in Newport, Rhode Island.
- 1958 – Jack Kilby demonstrates the first working integrated circuit while working at Texas Instruments.
- 1959 – The Soviet Union launches a large rocket, Lunik II, at the Moon.
- 1959 – Bonanza, the first regularly scheduled TV program presented in color, is launched in the United States.
- 1961 – The African and Malagasy Union is founded.
- 1961 – Air France Flight 2005 crashes near Rabat–Salé Airport, in Rabat, Morocco, killing 77 people.
- 1962 – US President John F. Kennedy delivers his "We choose to go to the Moon" speech at Rice University.
- 1966 – Launch of Gemini 11, the penultimate mission of NASA's Gemini program, and the current human altitude record holder (except for the Apollo lunar missions and Artemis II).
- 1969 – Philippine Air Lines Flight 158 crashes in Antipolo, near Manila International Airport in the Philippines, killing 45 people.
- 1970 – Dawson's Field hijackings: Popular Front for the Liberation of Palestine terrorists blow up three hijacked airliners in Zarqa, Jordan, continuing to hold the passengers hostage in various undisclosed locations in Amman.
- 1974 – Emperor Haile Selassie of Ethiopia, 'Messiah' of the Rastafari movement, is deposed following a military coup by the Derg, ending a reign of 58 years.
- 1977 – South African anti-apartheid activist Steve Biko dies in police custody.
- 1980 – The 43rd government of Turkey is overthrown in a coup d'état led by General Kenan Evren.
- 1980 – Florida Commuter Airlines Flight 65 crashes into the Atlantic Ocean off West End, Bahamas, killing 34 people.
- 1983 – A Wells Fargo depot in West Hartford, Connecticut, United States, is robbed of approximately US$7 million by Los Macheteros.
- 1983 – The USSR vetoes a United Nations Security Council Resolution deploring the Soviet destruction of Korean Air Lines Flight 007.
- 1984 – Dwight Gooden sets the baseball record for strikeouts in a season by a rookie with 276, previously set by Herb Score with 246 in 1954. Gooden's 276 strikeouts that season, pitched in 218 innings, set the current record.
- 1988 – Hurricane Gilbert devastates Jamaica; it turns towards Mexico's Yucatán Peninsula two days later, causing an estimated $5 billion in damage.
- 1990 – The two German states and the Four Powers sign the Treaty on the Final Settlement with Respect to Germany in Moscow, paving the way for German reunification.
- 1990 – The Red Cross organizations of mainland China and Taiwan sign the Kinmen Agreement on repatriation of illegal immigrants and criminal suspects after two days of talks in Kinmen, Fujian Province in response to the two tragedies in repatriation in the previous two months. It is the first agreement reached by private organizations across the Taiwan Strait.
- 1991 – NASA launches Space Shuttle Discovery on STS-48 to deploy the Upper Atmosphere Research Satellite.
- 1992 – NASA launches Space Shuttle Endeavour on STS-47, which marks the 50th shuttle mission. On board are Mae Carol Jemison, the first African-American woman in space, Mamoru Mohri, the first Japanese citizen to fly in a US spacecraft, and Mark Lee and Jan Davis, the first married couple in space.
- 1992 – Abimael Guzmán, leader of the Shining Path, is captured by Peruvian special forces; shortly thereafter the rest of Shining Path's leadership fell as well.
- 1993 – NASA launches Space Shuttle Discovery on STS-51.
- 1994 – Frank Eugene Corder fatally crashes a single-engine Cessna 150 into the White House's south lawn, striking the West Wing. There were no other casualties.
- 2001 – Ansett Australia, Australia's first commercial interstate airline, collapses due to increased strain on the international airline industry, leaving 10,000 people unemployed.
- 2003 – The United Nations lifts sanctions against Libya after that country agreed to accept responsibility and recompense the families of victims in the 1988 bombing of Pan Am Flight 103.
- 2003 – Iraq War: In Fallujah, U.S. forces mistakenly shoot and kill eight Iraqi police officers.
- 2003 – Typhoon Maemi, the strongest recorded typhoon to strike South Korea, made landfall near Busan.
- 2005 – Israeli–Palestinian conflict: the Israeli disengagement from Gaza is completed, leaving some 2,530 homes demolished.
- 2007 – Former Philippine President Joseph Estrada is convicted of plunder.
- 2007 – Two earthquakes measuring 8.4 and 7.9 on the Richter Scale hits the Indonesian island of Sumatra, killing 25 people and injuring 161.
- 2008 – The 2008 Chatsworth train collision in Los Angeles between a Metrolink commuter train and a Union Pacific freight train kills 25 people.
- 2012 – Petropavlovsk-Kamchatsky Air Flight 251 crashes on approach to Palana Airport, killing 10 and injuring four.
- 2013 – NASA confirms that its Voyager 1 probe has become the first manmade object to enter interstellar space.
- 2014 – The Synagogue Church building collapse results in the deaths of 115 people and several injured, in the Church run by Nigeria's T. B. Joshua.
- 2021 – Siberian Light Aviation Flight 51 crashes short of the runway at Kazachinskoye Airport, killing four.

== Births ==
=== Pre-1600 ===
- 1415 – John Mowbray, 3rd Duke of Norfolk (died 1461)
- 1494 – Francis I of France (died 1547)
- 1590 – María de Zayas, Spanish writer (died 1661)

=== 1601–1900 ===
- 1605 – William Dugdale, English genealogist and historian (died 1686)
- 1690 – Peter Dens, Flemish theologian and academic (died 1775)
- 1736 – Hsinbyushin, Burmese king (died 1776)
- 1739 – Mary Bosanquet Fletcher, Methodist preacher and philanthropist (died 1815)
- 1740 – Johann Heinrich Jung, German author and academic (died 1817)
- 1768 – Benjamin Carr, English-American singer-songwriter, educator, and publisher (died 1831)
- 1797 – Samuel Joseph May, American activist (died 1871)
- 1812 – Edward Shepherd Creasy, English historian and jurist (died 1878)
- 1812 – Richard March Hoe, American engineer and businessman, invented the Rotary printing press (died 1886)
- 1816 – Aurora von Qvanten, Swedish writer and artist (died 1907)
- 1818 – Richard Jordan Gatling, American inventor, invented the Gatling gun (died 1903)
- 1818 – Theodor Kullak, German pianist, composer, and educator (died 1882)
- 1828 – William Morgan, English-Australian politician, 14th Premier of South Australia (died 1883)
- 1829 – Anselm Feuerbach, German painter (died 1880)
- 1829 – Charles Dudley Warner, American essayist and novelist (died 1900)
- 1830 – William Sprague, American businessman and politician, 27th Governor of Rhode Island (died 1915)
- 1837 – Louis IV, Grand Duke of Hesse (died 1892)
- 1852 – H. H. Asquith, English lawyer and politician, Prime Minister of the United Kingdom (died 1928)
- 1855 – Simon-Napoléon Parent, Canadian lawyer and politician, 12th Premier of Quebec (died 1920)
- 1856 – Johann Heinrich Beck, American composer and conductor (died 1924)
- 1857 – Manuel Espinosa Batista, Colombian pharmacist and politician (died 1919)
- 1862 – Carl Eytel, German-American painter and illustrator (died 1925)
- 1866 – Freeman Freeman-Thomas, 1st Marquess of Willingdon, English cricketer and politician, 13th Governor General of Canada (died 1941)
- 1869 – Paweł Owerłło, Polish actor (died 1957)
- 1875 – Matsunosuke Onoe, Japanese actor and director (died 1926)
- 1880 – H. L. Mencken, American journalist and critic (died 1956)
- 1882 – Ion Agârbiceanu, Romanian journalist, politician, and archbishop (died 1963)
- 1884 – Martin Klein, Estonian wrestler and coach (died 1947)
- 1885 – Heinrich Hoffmann, German photographer and art dealer (died 1957)
- 1888 – Maurice Chevalier, French actor, singer, and dancer (died 1972)
- 1889 – Ugo Pasquale Mifsud, Maltese politician, 3rd Prime Minister of Malta (died 1942)
- 1891 – Pedro Albizu Campos, Puerto Rican lawyer and politician (died 1965)
- 1891 – Jean-François Martial, Belgian actor (died 1977)
- 1891 – Arthur Hays Sulzberger, American publisher (died 1968)
- 1892 – Alfred A. Knopf Sr., American publisher, founded Alfred A. Knopf Inc. (died 1984)
- 1894 – Kyuichi Tokuda, Japanese lawyer and politician (died 1953)
- 1894 – Dorothy Maud Wrinch, Argentinian-English mathematician, biochemist and philosopher (died 1976)
- 1894 – Bibhutibhushan Bandyopadhyay, Indian novelist and short story writer (died 1950)
- 1895 – Freymóður Jóhannsson, Icelandic painter and composer (died 1973)
- 1897 – Irène Joliot-Curie, French chemist and physicist, Nobel Prize laureate (died 1956)
- 1897 – Walter B. Gibson, American magician and author (died 1985)
- 1898 – Salvador Bacarisse, Spanish composer (died 1963)
- 1898 – Alma Moodie, Australian violinist and educator (died 1943)
- 1898 – Ben Shahn, Lithuanian-American painter and photographer (died 1969)
- 1900 – Martha Atwell, American radio director (died 1949)
- 1900 – Haskell Curry, American mathematician, logician, and academic (died 1982)

=== 1901–present ===
- 1901 – Shmuel Horowitz, Israeli agronomist and academic (died 1999)
- 1902 – Juscelino Kubitschek, Brazilian physician and politician, 21st President of Brazil (died 1976)
- 1902 – Marya Zaturenska, Ukrainian-American poet and author (died 1982)
- 1905 – Linda Agostini, English-Australian murder victim (died 1934)
- 1908 – Werner Flume, German jurist (died 2009)
- 1909 – Donald MacDonald, Canadian trade union leader and politician (died 1986)
- 1913 – Jesse Owens, American sprinter and long jumper (died 1980)
- 1914 – Desmond Llewelyn, Welsh-English soldier and actor (died 1999)
- 1921 – Stanisław Lem, Polish philosopher and author (died 2006)
- 1921 – Turgut Cansever, Turkish architect, city planner, and thinker (died 2009)
- 1922 – Antonio Cafiero, Argentinian accountant and politician, Governor of Buenos Aires Province (died 2014)
- 1922 – Mark Rosenzweig, American psychologist and academic (died 2009)
- 1924 – Amílcar Cabral, Guinea-Bissauan political leader (died 1973)
- 1925 – Dickie Moore, American actor (died 2015)
- 1927 – Mathé Altéry, French soprano and actress
- 1928 – Muriel Siebert, American businesswoman and philanthropist (died 2013)
- 1928 – Joseph John Gerry, American Roman Catholic prelate (died 2023)
- 1930 – Larry Austin, American composer and educator (died 2018)
- 1931 – Ian Holm, English actor (died 2020)
- 1931 – George Jones, American singer-songwriter and guitarist (died 2013)
- 1932 – Atli Dam, Faroese engineer and politician, 5th Prime Minister of the Faroe Islands (died 2005)
- 1934 – Glenn Davis, American hurdler, sprinter, and football player (died 2009)
- 1934 – Jaegwon Kim, South Korean-American philosopher and academic (died 2019)
- 1934 – Nellie Wong, Chinese American poet and activist
- 1935 – Richard Hunt, American sculptor (died 2023)
- 1937 – George Chuvalo, Canadian boxer (died 2026)
- 1937 – Wes Hall, Barbadian cricketer and politician
- 1938 – Judy Clay, American soul and gospel singer (died 2001)
- 1938 – Claude Ruel, Canadian ice hockey player and coach (died 2015)
- 1938 – Tatiana Troyanos, American operatic soprano (died 1993)
- 1939 – Henry Waxman, American lawyer and politician
- 1940 – Linda Gray, American model and actress
- 1942 – Michel Drucker, French journalist
- 1942 – Tomás Marco, Spanish composer
- 1942 – Maria Muldaur, American folk and blues singer
- 1942 – François Tavenas, Canadian engineer and academic (died 2004)
- 1943 – Ralph Neely, American football player (died 2022)
- 1943 – Michael Ondaatje, Sri Lankan-Canadian author and poet
- 1944 – Lonnie Mayne, American wrestler (died 1978)
- 1944 – Vladimir Spivakov, Russian violinist and conductor
- 1944 – Barry White, American singer-songwriter (died 2003)
- 1945 – Russell "Jungle Jim" Liberman, American drag racer (died 1977)
- 1945 – Milo Manara, Italian author and illustrator
- 1945 – John Mauceri, American conductor and producer
- 1946 – Tony Bellamy, American singer-songwriter and guitarist (died 2009)
- 1946 – Neil Lyndon, British journalist and writer
- 1947 – David Grant, English engineer and academic
- 1947 – Gerald Howarth, English soldier, pilot, and politician, Minister for International Security Strategy
- 1947 – Christopher Neame, English actor
- 1948 – Steve Turre, American trombonist and educator
- 1948 – Max Walker, Australian footballer, cricketer, sportscaster, and architect (died 2016)
- 1949 – Charles Burlingame, American captain and pilot (died 2001)
- 1949 – Irina Rodnina, Russian figure skater and politician
- 1950 – Marguerite Blais, Canadian journalist and politician
- 1950 – Gustav Brunner, Austrian engineer
- 1950 – Bruce Mahler, American actor and screenwriter
- 1950 – Mike Murphy, Canadian ice hockey player and coach
- 1951 – Bertie Ahern, Irish accountant and politician, 11th Taoiseach of Ireland
- 1951 – Norm Dubé, Canadian ice hockey player
- 1951 – Ray Gravell, Welsh rugby player and actor (died 2007)
- 1951 – Joe Pantoliano, American actor and producer
- 1951 – Ali-Ollie Woodson, American singer-songwriter and keyboard player (died 2010)
- 1952 – Gerry Beckley, American singer-songwriter and guitarist
- 1952 – Neil Peart, Canadian drummer, songwriter, and producer (died 2020)
- 1953 – Nan Goldin, American photographer
- 1954 – Robert Gober, American sculptor
- 1954 – Scott Hamilton, American saxophonist
- 1954 – Peeter Volkonski, Estonian singer-songwriter and actor
- 1955 – Peter Scolari, American actor (died 2021)
- 1955 – Brian Smith, English footballer (died 2013)
- 1956 – Leslie Cheung, Hong Kong singer-songwriter and actor (died 2003)
- 1956 – BA Robertson, Scottish songwriter
- 1956 – Walter Woon, Singaporean lawyer and politician, 7th Attorney-General of Singapore
- 1957 – Jan Egeland, Norwegian politician, diplomat and humanitarian
- 1957 – Rachel Ward, English-Australian actress
- 1957 – Hans Zimmer, German composer and producer
- 1958 – Wilfred Benítez, American boxer
- 1958 – Gregg Edelman, American actor and singer
- 1959 – Scott Brown, American colonel and politician
- 1959 – Deron Cherry, American football player and sportscaster
- 1959 – Sigmar Gabriel, German educator and politician, 17th Vice-Chancellor of Germany
- 1960 – Road Warrior Animal, American wrestler (died 2020)
- 1960 – Evan Jenkins, American academic and politician
- 1960 – Stefanos Korkolis, Greek pianist and composer
- 1961 – Mylène Farmer, Canadian-French singer-songwriter, producer, and actress
- 1962 – Sunay Akın, Turkish poet, journalist, and philanthropist
- 1962 – Amy Yasbeck, American actress
- 1964 – Greg Gutfeld, American television journalist and author
- 1964 – Dieter Hecking, German footballer and manager
- 1965 – Einstein Kristiansen, Norwegian animator and producer
- 1965 – Vernon Maxwell, American basketball player
- 1965 – Midnight, Jamaican wrestler
- 1966 – Darren E. Burrows, American actor
- 1966 – Ben Folds, American singer-songwriter, guitarist, and producer
- 1966 – Vezio Sacratini, Canadian ice hockey player
- 1967 – Louis C.K., American comedian, actor, producer, and screenwriter
- 1967 – Pat Listach, American baseball player, coach, and manager
- 1968 – Larry LaLonde, American guitarist and songwriter
- 1968 – Nicholas Russell, 6th Earl Russell, English politician (died 2014)
- 1968 – Richard Snell, South African cricketer and physiotherapist
- 1968 – Paul F. Tompkins, American comedian, actor, and writer
- 1969 – Max Boot, Russian-American historian and author
- 1969 – Ángel Cabrera, Argentinian golfer
- 1969 – James Frey, American author and screenwriter
- 1969 – Shigeki Maruyama, Japanese golfer
- 1970 – Will Chase, American actor, director, and singer
- 1970 – Nathan Larson, American singer-songwriter and guitarist
- 1971 – Younes El Aynaoui, Moroccan tennis player
- 1971 – Shocker, Mexican wrestler
- 1972 – Gideon Emery, English-American actor, producer, and screenwriter
- 1972 – Paul Green, Australian rugby league player and coach (died 2022)
- 1972 – Sidney Souza, Brazilian footballer
- 1973 – Kara David, Filipino journalist and documentarian
- 1973 – Martina Ertl-Renz, German skier
- 1973 – Martin Lapointe, Canadian ice hockey player and coach
- 1973 – Paul Walker, American actor (died 2013)
- 1974 – Caroline Aigle, French soldier and pilot (died 2007)
- 1974 – Jennifer Nettles, American singer-songwriter
- 1974 – Guy Smith, English race car driver
- 1974 – Kenichi Suzumura, Japanese voice actor and singer-songwriter
- 1974 – Nuno Valente, Portuguese footballer and coach
- 1975 – Luis Castillo, Dominican baseball player
- 1975 – Bill Kirby, Australian swimmer and coach
- 1976 – Lauren Stamile, American actress
- 1976 – Maciej Żurawski, Polish footballer
- 1977 – Nathan Bracken, Australian cricketer
- 1977 – Grant Denyer, Australian racing driver and journalist
- 1977 – Jeff Irwin, American singer-songwriter and producer
- 1977 – David Thompson, English footballer
- 1978 – Elisabetta Canalis, Italian model and actress
- 1978 – Benjamin McKenzie, American actor
- 1978 – Ruben Studdard, American R&B, pop, and gospel singer
- 1980 – Sean Burroughs, American baseball player (died 2024)
- 1980 – Fernando César de Souza, Brazilian footballer
- 1980 – Yao Ming, Chinese basketball player
- 1980 – Kevin Sinfield, English rugby player
- 1980 – Josef Vašíček, Czech ice hockey player (died 2011)
- 1981 – Jennifer Hudson, American singer and actress
- 1981 – Staciana Stitts, American swimmer
- 1982 – Zoran Planinić, Croatian basketball player
- 1982 – Sal Rinauro, American wrestler
- 1983 – Tom Geißler, German footballer
- 1983 – Daniel Muir, American football player
- 1983 – Sergio Parisse, Argentinian-Italian rugby player
- 1983 – Clayton Richard, American baseball player
- 1983 – Carly Smithson, Irish singer-songwriter
- 1983 – Niels Tas, Belgian politician
- 1984 – Nashat Akram, Iraqi footballer
- 1984 – Chelsea Carey, Canadian curler
- 1984 – Petra Marklund, Swedish singer
- 1986 – Alfie Allen, English actor
- 1986 – Joanne Jackson, English swimmer
- 1986 – Yuto Nagatomo, Japanese footballer
- 1986 – Dimitrios Regas, Greek sprinter
- 1986 – Emmy Rossum, American singer and actress
- 1988 – Amanda Jenssen, Swedish singer-songwriter and guitarist
- 1988 – Guðmundur Ari Sigurjónsson, Icelandic politician
- 1989 – Freddie Freeman, American-Canadian baseball player
- 1989 – Andrew Luck, American football player
- 1991 – Mike Towell, Scottish professional boxer (died 2016)
- 1991 – Scott Wootton, English footballer
- 1992 – Alexia Fast, Canadian actress
- 1992 – Sviatlana Pirazhenka, Belarusian tennis player
- 1993 – Kelsea Ballerini, American country pop singer
- 1994 – Druski, American comedian and actor
- 1994 – RM, South Korean rapper, songwriter and record producer
- 1994 – Elina Svitolina, Ukrainian tennis player
- 1994 – Mohammed Asif, Indian sailor and researcher
- 1995 – Steven Gardiner, Bahamian sprinter
- 1996 – Colin Ford, American actor
- 1997 – Sydney Sweeney, American actress
- 1997 – Almida de Val, Swedish curler
- 1999 – Jerome Ford, American football player
- 2001 – Ziaire Williams, American basketball player
- 2007 – Kim Hyeon-oh, South Korean footballer

== Deaths ==
=== Pre-1600 ===
- 640 – Sak Kʼukʼ, Mayan queen
- 973 – Nefingus, bishop of Angers
- 1185 – Andronikos I Komnenos, Byzantine emperor (born 1118)
- 1213 – Peter II of Aragon (born 1174)
- 1362 – Pope Innocent VI (born 1295)
- 1368 – Blanche of Lancaster (born 1345/1347)
- 1439 – Sidi El Houari, Algerian imam (born 1350)
- 1500 – Albert III, Duke of Saxony (born 1443)
- 1544 – Clément Marot, French poet (born 1496)

=== 1601–1900 ===
- 1612 – Vasili IV of Russia (born 1552)
- 1642 – Henri Coiffier de Ruzé, Marquis of Cinq-Mars, French conspirator (born 1620)
- 1660 – Jacob Cats, Dutch poet, jurist, and politician (born 1577)
- 1665 – Jean Bolland, Belgian priest and hagiographer (born 1596)
- 1672 – Tanneguy Le Fèvre, French scholar and author (born 1615)
- 1674 – Nicolaes Tulp, Dutch anatomist and politician (born 1593)
- 1683 – Afonso VI of Portugal (born 1643)
- 1712 – Jan van der Heyden, Dutch painter and illustrator (born 1637)
- 1764 – Jean-Philippe Rameau, French composer and theorist (born 1683)
- 1779 – Richard Grenville-Temple, 2nd Earl Temple, English politician, Lord Lieutenant of Buckinghamshire (born 1711)
- 1810 – Sir Francis Baring, 1st Baronet, English banker and politician (born 1740)
- 1814 – Robert Ross, Irish general (born 1766)
- 1819 – Gebhard Leberecht von Blücher, Prussian general (born 1742)
- 1836 – Christian Dietrich Grabbe, German playwright (born 1801)
- 1869 – Peter Mark Roget, English physician, theologian, and lexicographer (born 1779)
- 1870 – Eleanora Atherton, English philanthropist (born 1782)
- 1870 – Fitz Hugh Ludlow, American journalist, explorer, and author (born 1836)
- 1874 – François Guizot, French historian and politician, 22nd Prime Minister of France (born 1787)

=== 1901–present ===
- 1903 – Duncan Gillies, Scottish-Australian businessman and politician, 14th Premier of Victoria (born 1834)
- 1907 – Ilia Chavchavadze, Georgian poet, journalist, and lawyer (born 1837)
- 1912 – Pierre-Hector Coullié, French cardinal (born 1829)
- 1918 – George Reid, Australian accountant and politician, 4th Prime Minister of Australia (born 1845)
- 1919 – Leonid Andreyev, Russian author and playwright (born 1871)
- 1923 – Jules Violle, French physicist and academic (born 1841)
- 1927 – Sarah Frances Whiting, American physicist and astronomer (born 1847)
- 1942 – Valentine Baker, Welsh co-founder of the Martin-Baker Aircraft Company (born 1888)
- 1945 – Hajime Sugiyama, Japanese field marshal and politician, 44th Japanese Minister of War (born 1880)
- 1949 – Erik Adolf von Willebrand, Finnish physician (born 1870)
- 1953 – James Hamilton, 3rd Duke of Abercorn, English politician, Governor of Northern Ireland (born 1869)
- 1953 – Hugo Schmeisser, German engineer (born 1884)
- 1953 – Lewis Stone, American actor (born 1879)
- 1956 – Sándor Festetics, Hungarian politician, Hungarian Minister of War (born 1882)
- 1961 – Carl Hermann, German physicist and academic (born 1898)
- 1962 – Spot Poles, American baseball player and soldier (born 1887)
- 1962 – Rangeya Raghav, Indian author and playwright (born 1923)
- 1965 – Raja Aziz Bhatti, Pakistani Major who received the Nishan-e-Haider in the Indo-Pakistani War of 1965.
- 1967 – Vladimir Bartol, Italian-Slovene author and playwright (born 1903)
- 1968 – Tommy Armour, Scottish-American golfer and journalist (born 1894)
- 1971 – Walter Egan, American golfer (born 1881)
- 1972 – William Boyd, American actor and producer (born 1895)
- 1977 – Steve Biko, South African activist (born 1946)
- 1977 – Robert Lowell, American poet (born 1917)
- 1978 – William Hudson, New Zealand-Australian engineer (born 1896)
- 1981 – Eugenio Montale, Italian writer, Nobel Prize laureate (born 1896)
- 1982 – Federico Moreno Torroba, Spanish composer and conductor (born 1891)
- 1986 – Jacques Henri Lartigue, French painter and photographer (born 1894)
- 1986 – Charlotte Wolff, German-English psychotherapist and physician (born 1897)
- 1987 – John Qualen, Canadian-American actor (born 1899)
- 1990 – Athene Seyler, English actress (born 1889)
- 1991 – Bruce Matthews, Canadian general and businessman (born 1909)
- 1992 – Ruth Nelson, American actress (born 1905)
- 1992 – Anthony Perkins, American actor, singer, and director (born 1932)
- 1993 – Raymond Burr, Canadian-American actor and director (born 1917)
- 1994 – Tom Ewell, American actor (born 1909)
- 1994 – Boris Yegorov, Russian physician and astronaut (born 1937)
- 1995 – Jeremy Brett, English actor (born 1933)
- 1995 – Yasutomo Nagai, Japanese motorcycle racer (born 1965)
- 1996 – Ernesto Geisel, Brazilian general and politician, 29th President of Brazil (born 1907)
- 1997 – Judith Merril, American-Canadian science fiction writer, editor and political activist (born 1923)
- 2000 – Stanley Turrentine, American saxophonist, composer, and bandleader (born 1934)
- 2003 – Johnny Cash, American singer-songwriter, guitarist, and actor (born 1932)
- 2003 – Arthur Johnson, canoeist (born 1921)
- 2005 – Serge Lang, French-American mathematician, author and academic (born 1927)
- 2007 – Bobby Byrd, American singer-songwriter and producer (born 1934)
- 2008 – Bob Quinn, Australian footballer and coach (born 1915)
- 2008 – David Foster Wallace, American novelist, short story writer, and essayist (born 1962)
- 2009 – Norman Borlaug, American agronomist and humanitarian, Nobel Prize laureate (born 1914)
- 2009 – Jack Kramer, American tennis player and sportscaster (born 1921)
- 2009 – Willy Ronis, French photographer and author (born 1910)
- 2010 – Claude Chabrol, French actor, director, producer, and screenwriter (born 1930)
- 2010 – Giulio Zignoli, Italian footballer (born 1946)
- 2011 – Alexander Galimov, Russian ice hockey player (born 1985)
- 2012 – Arkadii Dragomoshchenko, Russian poet and author (born 1946)
- 2012 – Jon Finlayson, Australian actor and screenwriter (born 1938)
- 2012 – Tom Sims, American skateboarder and snowboarder, founded Sims Snowboards (born 1950)
- 2013 – Ray Dolby, American engineer and businessman, founded Dolby Laboratories (born 1933)
- 2013 – Warren Giese, American football player, coach, and politician (born 1924)
- 2013 – Erich Loest, German author and screenwriter (born 1926)
- 2013 – Candace Pert, American neuroscientist and pharmacologist (born 1946)
- 2014 – Atef Ebeid, Egyptian academic and politician, 47th Prime Minister of Egypt (born 1932)
- 2014 – John Gustafson, English singer-songwriter and bass player (born 1942)
- 2014 – Ian Paisley, Northern Irish evangelical pastor (Free Presbyterian Church) and politician, 2nd First Minister of Northern Ireland (born 1926)
- 2014 – Joe Sample, American pianist and composer (born 1939)
- 2015 – Claudia Card, American philosopher and academic (born 1940)
- 2017 – Allan MacEachen, Canadian economist and politician, Deputy Prime Minister of Canada (born 1921)
- 2017 – Edith Windsor, American LGBT rights activist and technology manager at IBM (born 1929)
- 2018 – Shen Chun-shan, Taiwanese academic (born 1932)
- 2019 – ʻAkilisi Pōhiva, Tongan politician and activist, Prime Minister of Tonga (born 1941)
- 2019 – Elsie Vartanian, American politician and director of the United States Women's Bureau (born 1930)
- 2024 – Sitaram Yechury, Indian politician and leader of CPI(M) (born 1952)
- 2026 – George Chuvalo, Canadian boxer (born 1937)

== Holidays and observances ==
- Christian feast day:
  - Ailbe (Elvis, Eilfyw) of Emly
  - Guy of Anderlecht
  - The Most Holy Name of the Blessed Virgin Mary
  - John Henry Hobart (Episcopal Church (USA))
  - Laisrén mac Nad Froích
  - Sacerdos of Lyon
  - Blessed Thomas of Zumárraga
  - September 12 (Eastern Orthodox liturgics)
- Commemoration of the mass hanging of the Saint Patrick's Battalion (Mexico)
- Day of Conception (Russia)
- Defenders Day (Maryland, United States)
- Enkutatash falls on this day if it is a leap year. Celebrated on the first day of Mäskäräm. (Ethiopia, Eritrea, Rastafari)
- Nayrouz (Coptic Orthodox Church) (leap years only, September 11 on normal years)
- National Day (Cape Verde)
- National Day of Encouragement (United States)
- Saragarhi Day (Sikhism)
- United Nations Day for South–South Cooperation (International)
