= Ust-Aga =

Ust-Aga Усть-Ага
- Selo
- Location within Zabaykalsky Krai Location within Russia
- Coordinates: 51°32′N 115°50′E
- Country: Russia
- Region: Zabaykalsky Krai
- District: Shilkinsky District
- Time zone: UTC+9:00

Ust-Aga (Russian: Усть-Ага) is a rural locality (a selo) in Shilkinsky District, Zabaykalsky Krai, Russia. Population: 79 (2010 census); 129 (2002 census); There are 2 streets in this selo.

== Geography ==
This rural locality is located 37 km from Shilka (the district's administrative centre), 171 km from Chita (capital of Zabaykalsky Krai) and 5,430 km from Moscow. Kirocha is the nearest rural locality.
