= Novoberezovskoye =

Novoberezovskoye Новоберёзовское
- Selo
- Location within Zabaykalsky Krai Location within Russia
- Coordinates: 50°07′N 116°06′E
- Country: Russia
- Region: Zabaykalsky Krai
- District: Shilkinsky District
- Time zone: UTC+9:00

Novoberezovskoye (Russian: Новоберёзовское) is a rural locality (a selo) in Shilkinsky District, Zabaykalsky Krai, Russia. Population: 308 (2021 census); 383 (2010 census); There are 7 streets in this selo.

== Geography ==
This rural locality is located 30 km from Shilka (the district's administrative centre), 178 km from Chita (capital of Zabaykalsky Krai) and 5,374 km from Moscow. Nizhnyaya Khila is the nearest rural locality.
