= Aprelkovo =

Aprelkovo Апрелково
- Selo
- Location within Zabaykalsky Krai Location within Russia
- Coordinates: 51°52′N 116°16′E
- Country: Russia
- Region: Zabaykalsky Krai
- District: Shilkinsky District
- Time zone: UTC+9:00

Aprelkovo (Russian: Апрелково) is a rural locality (a selo) in Shilkinsky District, Zabaykalsky Krai, Russia. Population: 16 (2021 census); 19 (2010 census); There are 3 streets in this selo.

== Geography ==
This rural locality is located 17 km from Shilka (the district's administrative centre), 192 km from Chita (capital of Zabaykalsky Krai) and 5,417 km from Moscow. Kholbon is the nearest rural locality.
