= Baytsetuy =

Baytsetuy Байцетуй
- Selo
- Location within Zabaykalsky Krai Location within Russia
- Coordinates: 51°53′N 115°19′E
- Country: Russia
- Region: Zabaykalsky Krai
- District: Shilkinsky District
- Time zone: UTC+9:00

Baytsetuy (Russian: Байцетуй) is a rural locality (a selo) in Shilkinsky District, Zabaykalsky Krai, Russia. Population: 143 (2010 census); 160 (2002 census); There are 3 streets in this selo.

== Geography ==
This rural locality is located 49 km from Shilka (the district's administrative centre), 126 km from Chita (capital of Zabaykalsky Krai) and 5,349 km from Moscow. Zubarevo is the nearest rural locality.
