= Butikha =

Butikha Бутиха
- Selo
- Location within Zabaykalsky Krai Location within Russia
- Coordinates: 52°19′N 115°49′E
- Country: Russia
- Region: Zabaykalsky Krai
- District: Tungokochensky District
- Time zone: UTC+9:00

Butikha (Russian: Бутиха) is a rural locality (a selo) in Tungokochensky District, Zabaykalsky Krai, Russia. Population: 73 (2021 census); 90 (2010 census); 112 (2002 census); There are 2 streets in this selo.

== Geography ==
This rural locality is located 59 km from Verkh-Usugli (the district's administrative centre), 161 km from Chita (capital of Zabaykalsky Krai) and 5,329 km from Moscow. Sukhaytuy is the nearest rural locality.
