= Siberian Light Aviation Flight 51 =

2021 aviation accident in Russia

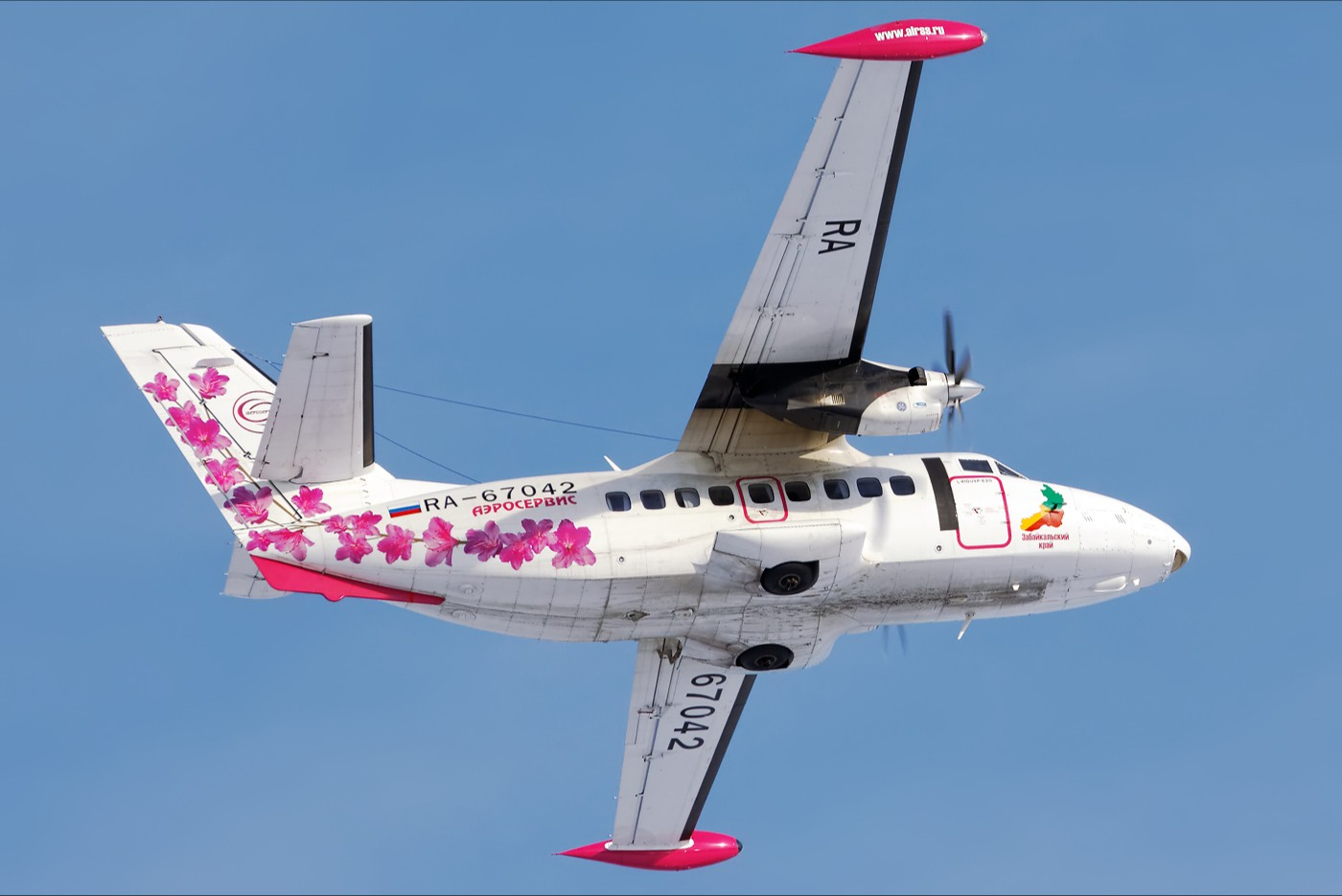
- RA-67042, the aircraft involved in the accident, pictured in 2015

Accident
- Date: 12 September 2021
- Summary: Controlled flight into terrain caused by Pilot error
- Site: 4 km short of the runway near Kazachinskoye Airport; 56°18′45″N 107°35′3.90″E

Aircraft
- Aircraft type: Let L-410UVP-E20
- Operator: Aeroservice on behalf of Siberian Light Aviation
- Registration: RA-67042
- Flight origin: Irkutsk Airport
- Destination: Kazachinskoye Airport
- Occupants: 16
- Passengers: 14
- Crew: 2
- Fatalities: 4
- Injuries: 12
- Survivors: 12

Siberian Light Aviation Flight 51 was a passenger flight on September 12, 2021, by a Let L-410 Turbolet plane, from Irkutsk north to Kazachinskoje, Irkutsk Oblast, Siberia, near Lake Baikal. The plane crashed about 4 kilometers (2.5 miles) from the airport.

The Interstate Aviation Committee (IAC or MAK), the Russian Accident Commission, determined that the crash was caused by the crew failing to comply with night flight rules.

The flight was operated on behalf of Aeroservice LLC.

== Background ==
The aircraft, a Let L-410 Turbolet model UVP-E20, was manufactured and commissioned in 2014. The Let-410 is built by Czech aerospace manufacturer Let Kunovice.

The airline Siberian Light Aviation, also known by the name of Sila Avia, was founded in January 2017 and flies short-haul flights in Siberia and areas just southwest of Siberia such as Omsk, Tiumen, Yekaterinburg, Chelyabinsk and Nizhny Tagil. Their headquarters is in Magadan. At the time of the accident, there were eight L-410 aircraft and three Antonov An-28 aircraft in their fleet.

After a previously spotless safety record, Flight 51 was the airline's second serious incident in 2021. On July 17, Siberian Light Aviation Flight 42, an Antonov-28 with 2 pilots, 2 other crew, and 14 passengers, suffered a dual engine failure and crash landed in a remote area in the Vasyugan Swamp in southwestern Siberia. In that accident, all of the occupants survived the accident with one crew member requiring surgery.

== Crew ==
The captain of Siberian Light Aviation Flight 51 had just over 5,600 flight hours at the time of the accident, including 483 hours as captain.

== Accident ==
After an earlier failed landing attempt at 10:35 p.m., the accident occurred at about 11:15 p.m. local time during the crew's second attempt to land the plane. In thick fog, the plane collided with trees on a cliff next to the Kirenga River, about 2.5 mi (4.0 km) southwest of the runway.

Rescuers were quickly on the scene and initially managed to rescue everyone on board. According to the region's governor, Igor Kobzev, five people were able to leave the wreckage on their own while the others had to be helped or carried out. Four people died from their injuries within 24 hours of the accident. Of the 16 people on board, 12 survived. Three passengers and the co-pilot were killed.

== Investigation ==
MAK, the Russian Accident Commission, launched an investigation into the accident on the same day.

The investigation showed that visibility was no more than 500 metres either at the time of the plane's first failed landing attempt or at the time of the accident.

Kazachinskoje Airport lacked sophisticated radar systems and the ability for aircraft to make instrumental landings (ILS). In the aftermath of the crash, Rosaviatsia, Russia's regulatory committee on civil aviation, has proposed an investigation and the possibility of banning night landings in Kazachinskoje and other airfields in Russia in the future, where visual landings are the only possibility and facilities for instrument landings are missing.

While the media speculates about pilot mistakes in flight in bad weather, the surviving captain has said in interviews after the accident that important navigational instruments were out of order and that played a role in the accident.

=== Conclusions ===
In the report released by the Russian Interstate Aviation Committee (MAK) it was established that the probable cause of the accident was the pilots' failure to comply with night flight rules.
