= Gololobovka =

Gololobovka (Russian: Гололобовка) is the name of several rural localities in Russia:

- Gololobovka, Kaluga Oblast, a village in Zhizdrinsky District of Kaluga Oblast
- Gololobovka, Kursk Oblast, a selo in Leshchinoplatavsky Selsoviet of Solntsevsky District in Kursk Oblast
- Gololobovka, Tambov Oblast, a selo in Glazkovsky Selsoviet of Michurinsky District in Tambov Oblast
