= Shilka =

Shilka may refer to:

- Shilka (river), a river in Zabaykalsky Krai, Russia
- Shilka (town), a town in Zabaykalsky Krai, Russia
- Shilka, alternative name of ZSU-23-4 Shilka, a Russian self-propelled radar-guided anti-aircraft weapon system

== See also ==
- Shilkinsky (disambiguation)
