= Silka =

Silka may refer to:

- Michael Silka (1958–1984), American spree killer
- Silka, a brand of Xella building and insulation materials
- Silka (given name), an Icelandic female given name

== See also ==
- Shilka (disambiguation)
- Sika deer
- SilkAir
