= Ononskoye =

Ononskoye Ононское
- Selo
- Location within Zabaykalsky Krai Location within Russia
- Coordinates: 51°28′N 115°57′E
- Country: Russia
- Region: Zabaykalsky Krai
- District: Shilkinsky District
- Time zone: UTC+9:00

Ononskoye (Russian: Ононское) is a rural locality (a selo) in Shilkinsky District, Zabaykalsky Krai, Russia. Population: 1,284 (2010 census); 1,478 (2002 census); There are 17 streets in this selo.

== Geography ==
This rural locality is located 42 km from Shilka (the district's administrative centre), 181 km from Chita (capital of Zabaykalsky Krai) and 5,446 km from Moscow. Makarovo is the nearest rural locality.
