= Krasny Yar, Zabaykalsky Krai =

Krasny Yar Красный Яр
- Selo
- Location within Zabaykalsky Krai Location within Russia
- Coordinates: 53°55′N 114°40′E
- Country: Russia
- Region: Zabaykalsky Krai
- District: Tungokochensky District
- Time zone: UTC+9:00

Krasny Yar (Russian: Красный Яр) is a rural locality (a selo) in Tungokochensky District, Zabaykalsky Krai, Russia. Population: 54 (2021 census); 77 (2010 census); 110 (2002 census); There are 5 streets in this selo.

== Geography ==
This rural locality is located 141 km from Verkh-Usugli (the district's administrative centre), 223 km from Chita (capital of Zabaykalsky Krai) and 5,501 km from Moscow. Bugunda is the nearest rural locality.
