= Solntsevo, Zabaykalsky Krai =

Solntsevo Солнцево
- Selo
- Location within Zabaykalsky Krai Location within Russia
- Coordinates: 51°45′N 115°40′E
- Country: Russia
- Region: Zabaykalsky Krai
- District: Shilkinsky District
- Time zone: UTC+9:00

Solntsevo (Russian: Солнцево) is a rural locality (a selo) in Shilkinsky District, Zabaykalsky Krai, Russia. Population: 228 (2021 census); 279 (2010 census); There are 6 streets in this selo.

== Geography ==
This rural locality is located 27 km from Shilka (the district's administrative centre), 153 km from Chita (capital of Zabaykalsky Krai) and 5,392 km from Moscow. Krasnoyarovo is the nearest rural locality.
