= Yumurchen =

Yumurchen Юмурчен
- Selo
- Location within Zabaykalsky Krai Location within Russia
- Coordinates: 53°36′N 114°02′E
- Country: Russia
- Region: Zabaykalsky Krai
- District: Tungokochensky District
- Time zone: UTC+9:00

Yumurchen (Russian: Юмурчен) is a rural locality (a selo) in Tungokochensky District, Zabaykalsky Krai, Russia. Population: 98 (2021 census); 118 (2010 census); 121 (2002 census); There are 6 streets in this selo.

== Geography ==
This rural locality is located 128 km from Verkh-Usugli (the district's administrative centre), 179 km from Chita (capital of Zabaykalsky Krai) and 5,047 km from Moscow. Bugunda is the nearest rural locality.
