= Ononsky =

Ononsky (masculine), Ononskaya (feminine), or Ononskoye (neuter) may refer to:

- Ononsky District, a district of Zabaykalsky Krai, Russia
- Ononskoye, a rural locality (a selo) in Zabaykalsky Krai, Russia
