= Timur Zhalsarayn =

Transbaikalian teacher, local historian, researcher

Timur Ukhinovich Zhalsarayn (1928, Suduntui village, Aginsky district – 1991, Kusocha village, Mogoytuisky district) was a Transbaikalian teacher, local historian, researcher.

== Biography ==
Timur Zhalsarayn was born in 1928 in the village of Suduntui, Aginsky District, to Polon Ukhin, a poor shepherd. He was the thirteenth child in a large family. Timur began his education in 1936 at a local school and later attended the Aginsky Pedagogical College. After graduating from school in 1946, he continued his education in geography at a higher educational institution in Irkutsk. In the early 1950s, Timur Ukhinovich started his teaching career at Aginsky secondary school, where he worked for many years. He also worked in other schools in the Aginsky District.

== Research ==
Т.U. Zhalsarayn identified thirty watershed points of triple watersheds between the most significant rivers. Of these, he described four of the most unique ones.

In 1977, T.U. Zhalsarayn highlighted the distinctiveness of the triple watershed of the river systems of the Yenisey, Lena and Amur – some of the largest river systems globally. In 1979, he stated that no other location in the world has any pair of great river systems that are either undefined or form a watershed point with a third river artery similar to itself. Analysing geographical maps, T.U. Zhalsarayn identified and indicated the geographical location of the confluence of the Yenisey, Lena and Amur river systems on the Yablonovy Mountains in Transbaikalia Krai near the city of Chita. Based on this geographical fact, in 1977 T.U. Zhalsarayn spoke about the unique geographical location of the Chita Oblast in the catchment areas of the three largest rivers in the world.

T.U. Zhalsarayn described the watershed points between various river systems and oceans and seas, including the Amur-Leno-Yenisei junction, the Pacific, Atlantic and Arctic Oceans, the Baltic, Caspian and Black Seas, and the Ganges, Indus and Brahmaputra river systems.

== Pedagogical skills ==
During the scientific-practical conference Timur Ukhinovich Zhalsarayn - Pedagogue, Geographer, Local Historian, Researcher held in April 2010 in Aginsky, it was stated that Timur Ukhinovich Zhalsarayn's name deserves to be mentioned alongside other great pedagogues such as Zankov and Amonashvili. He was a visionary educator who was ahead of his time by several decades. In the 1960s and 1970s, Zhalsarain introduced teaching based on the technology of logical reference notes (LOC or LOS - sheets of reference signals). This was particularly important in national schools where children had a strong command of their native language but not always the same level of Russian.

=== Persecution ===
The teacher's programme did not comply with the guidelines, which led to persecution and harassment by education officials. Subsequently, multiple inspections were conducted.

== Interests ==
During the 1960s, he directed passionately in a folk theatre. He studied Archimedes' works on numbers and regular polyhedrons. In the 1980s, he wrote several articles on onomastics, numerology, and fiction stories.

== Recognition of the merits of Timur Zhalsarayn ==
=== Scientific community's support ===
The ideas of T.U. Zhalsarayn were supported by F.P. Krendelev, Director of Chita Institute of Natural Resources SB AS USSR. Recognising the scientific significance of Zhalsarayn's discovery, the Zabaykalsky branch of the Russian Geographical Society recommended the creation of a natural monument called Watershed Mountain on the Yablonovy Ridge. In 1983, the Chita Executive Committee of People's Deputies of the USSR created the natural monument. In 2012, the Transbaikal Regional Branch of the Russian Geographical Society named the watershed mountain on the Yablonovy Ridge Pallas Mountain. According to the chairmen of Trans-Baikal Regional Branch of the Russian Geographical Society, Doctor of Historical Sciences A.V. Konstantinov (since 2010) and Y.T. Rudenko (before 2010), Pallas Mountain should become a kind of "Mecca" in cognitive tourism.

The ideas of T.U. Zhalsarayn have piqued the interest of Mongolian geographers and American researchers at the Glacier National Park research centre. The American Geographical Society took an interest in the research of T.U. Zhalsarayn. They offered to publish articles about him and his concept in American geographical journals. Every year, members of the Trans-Baikal Regional Branch of the Russian Geographical Society provide information about T.U. Zhalsarayn during mass ascents to Mount Pallas.

In the book published in 2020 by the Russian Geographical Society, called Modern Russia: geographical description of our Fatherland. Siberia, the "Apple Ridge – the great watershed of the two world oceans and the three largest rivers of the planet: Lena, Amur and Yenisei" was selected as the signature landmark of the Transbaikal Territory. The business card of the Zabaikalsky Krai is approved by the responsible editors of the publication, who are well-known Russian geographers. These include Academician of the Russian Academy of Sciences V.M. Kotlyakov and Doctor of Geographical Sciences L.M. Korytny, as well as its reviewers - Academician of the Russian Academy of Sciences V.A. Kryukov and Corresponding Member of the Russian Academy of Sciences V.A. Snytko.

=== Brands of the Zabaykalsky Krai ===
The research of T.U. Zhalsarayn served as the foundation for the brands of Zabaykalsky Krai, proposed by the Chairman of the Transbaikal Regional Branch of the Russian Geographical Society Y.T. Rudenko, archaeologist and bard K.O. Shlyamov, and hydrobiologist P.V. Matafonov.

=== Awards ===
- "Excellent Worker of Public Education of the RSFSR." («Отличник народного просвещения РСФСР»)

=== Conferences in memory of Timur Zhalsarayn ===
In 2010 the first conference Timur Ukhinovich Zhalsarayn - teacher, geographer, local historian, researcher was held in Aginskoye settlement.

In 2013, the Aginsky National Museum named after Gombozhab Tsybykov hosted the second scientific and practical conference titled Timur Ukhinovich Zhalsarayn - Teacher-Innovator, Researcher, Local Historian, which was dedicated to the 85th anniversary of the birth of the man who discovered the watershed on the Yablonovy Ridge.

In 2018, a conference was held to celebrate the 90th anniversary of T.U. Zhalsarayn.

In 2021, the 5th interregional scientific-practical conference Zhalsaraynovsky Readings-2021 took place in Aginskoye settlement.

=== In fiction ===
Timur Ukhinovich served as the prototype for the teacher in Zhamyan Baldanzhabon's book The Secrets of Alkhanai, which is part of the Buryat literature curriculum for secondary school.

=== Publications ===
- Zhalsarayn T.U. The point of the great watershed (Точка великого водораздела) // Забайкальский рабочий. 1977.
- Zhalsarayn Т.U. Four points on the planet (Четыре точки на планете) // Агинская правда. № 67. — 1979.

== Bibliography ==
- Атутова, Н.А. (2011). "Тимур Жалсарайн о горе Палласа и других водораздельных точках планеты". П. С. Паллас и его вклад в познание России: Сб. материалов Всероссийского симпозиума с международным участием. Chita: Поиск. pp. 87–88.
- Атутова, Н.А.; Филенко, Р.А. (2014). "О самой высокой водораздельной точке на планете". In Тулохонова, А.К.; Батоцыренова, Э.А. (eds.). Труды Бурятского республиканского отделения Русского географического общества. Vol. 19. Ulan-Ude: Изд-во Бурятского госуниверситета. pp. 72–79.
- Атутова, Н.А.; Филенко, Р.А. (2014). "Гора Палласа—ядро туристического кластера Забайкальского края (г.Иркутск, 22-25 сентября 2014г.)". Рекреационная география и инновации в туризме / Материалы II Всероссийской научно-практической конференции с международным участием. Irkutsk: Издательство Института географии им. В. Б. Сочавы СО РАН. pp. 198–200.
- Атутова, Н.А.; Филенко, Р.А.; Нармандах, Ч. (2015). "Крупные водораздельные точки Земли". География в школе. pp. 19–22.
- Атутова, Н.А.; Филенко, Р.А.; Нармандах, Ч. (2013). "Водораздельные точки Забайкалья и Монголии". In Тулохонов, А.К.; Гармаев, Е.Ж.; Михеева, А.С. (eds.). Окружающая среда и устойчивое развитие Монгольского плато и сопредельных территорий: материалы IX Междунар.конф. (Улан-Удэ, 20-22 августа 2013 г.). Vol. 1. Ulan-Ude: Изд-во Бурятского госуниверситета. pp. 126–128.
- Атутова, Н.А.; Филенко, Р.А.; Нармандах, Ч. (2015-01-16). "Водораздельные точки: история продолжается". Забайкальский рабочий.
- Дашидондоков, Ш-Н. (2018-03-27). "Научная концепция Т. У. Жалсарайна об истоках великих рек планеты". Агинская правда.
- Забайкалье. Современный путеводитель. Moscow: PressPass. 2019. p. 73.
- Каменев, Ф. (1984-06-07). "Исток трех великих рек". За науку в Сибири.
- Константинов, А.В.; Руденко, Ю.Т.; Шипицын, А.А. (2011). "Гора Палласа — Точка Великого Мирового водораздела". П. С. Паллас и его вклад в познание России: Сб. материалов Всероссийского симпозиума с международным участием. Chita: Поиск. pp. 102–104.
- Константинов, А.В.; Руденко, Ю.Т.; Шипицын, А.А. (2011-02-08). "Безымянная гора водораздела увековечит память о российском путешественнике". Забайкальский рабочий.
- "Массовое восхождение на гору Палласа в честь Дня Воды". Российское географическое общество. 2018-04-05.
- Матафонов, П.В. (2019). "Концепция развития туризма в Забайкальском крае «Единство великих рек мира»". Записки Забайкальского отделения Русского географического общества (136): 94–100.
- Орлова, П. (2008-04-07). "Ищем «cемь чудес» в каждом крае". Известия.
- Решение исполкома Читинского областного Совета народных депутатов РСФСР № 353 от 14 июля 1983 г. «Об утверждении памятников природы на территории Читинской области»
- Руденко, Ю.Т. (2007). "Великий мировой водораздел". Материалы ХIII научного совещания географов Сибири и Дальнего Востока. Vol. 2. Irkutsk: Изд-во Института географии им. В. Б. Сочавы СО РАН. pp. 105–106.
- Руденко, Ю. (2014-03-26). "Великий мировой водораздел в Забайкалье". Земля (13).
- Руденко, Ю. (2010-03-26). "История с географией «Великий водораздел» против «Великого истока»". Байкал24.
- Руденко, Ю.Т.; Константинов, А.В. (1999). "Достопримечательности у восточной границы Байкальского бассейна и устойчивое развитие". Проблемы охраняемых территорий и традиционное природопользование в Байкальском регионе. Ulan-Ude.
- Руденко, Ю. (2013-01-16). "Представления о водоразделах". Земля (3).
- Seven Wonders of Russia // Wikipedia
- Шлямов, К. (2018-04-12). "Все реки текут к своему истоку Гора Водораздельная как символ круговорота воды в природе". Читинское обозрение.
- Филенко, Р.А.; Атутова, Н.А. (2012). Константинов, А.В. (ed.). "О поиске точки стыка речных бассейнов Ганга, Инда и Брахмапутры в Гималаях". Записки Забайкальского отделения Русского географического общества (131). Изд-во ЗО РГО: 137–141.
- Филенко, Р.А.; Атутова, Н.А.; Нармандах, Ч. (2013). "Об открытии тройных водораздельных стыков: история, анализ, охрана". Материали за 9-а международна научна практична конференция, «Бъдещето въпроси от света на науката — 2013» (17-25 декабря 2013 г.). Vol. 31. Екология. География и геология. Sofia: «Бял ГРАД-БГ» ООД. pp. 72–78.
- Нармандах Ч., Атутова Н. А. Амарбаясгалан Ё. «Ус хагалбарын цэг хондлон уул»-ыг улсын тусгай хамгаалалтанд авах асуудал // Хурэлтогоот 2015 Газарзуй, Геологийн Салбарын Залуу Эрдэмтэн, Судлааачдын Бутэлийн Эмхэгтэл. — Улаанбаатар 2015 он 90-93
