= Shilkinsky =

Shilkinsky (masculine), Shilkinskaya (feminine), or Shilkinskoye (neuter) may refer to:

- Shilkinsky District, a district of Zabaykalsky Krai, Russia
- Shilkinskoye Urban Settlement, a municipal formation which the town of Shilka and one rural locality in Shilkinsky District of Zabaykalsky Krai, Russia are incorporated as
- Shilkinskoye (rural locality), a rural locality (a selo) in Kamyshlovsky District of Sverdlovsk Oblast, Russia
