= Karenga (river) =

River in southern East Siberia, Russia

- Mouth location in Zabaykalsky Krai, Russia

Location
- Country: Russia
- Federal subject: Zabaykalsky Krai

Physical characteristics
- Source: Yablonoi Mountains; South Siberian System
  - coordinates: 52°54′40″N 114°33′26″E
  - elevation: 1,612 m (5,289 ft)
- Mouth: Vitim
  - location: Near Ust-Karenga
  - coordinates: 54°27′41″N 116°31′01″E
  - elevation: 561 m (1,841 ft)
- Length: 366 km (227 mi)
- Basin size: 10,100 km^{2} (3,900 sq mi)
- Discharge
  - average: 55 m^{3}/s (1,900 cu ft/s)

Basin features
- Progression: Vitim→ Lena→ Laptev Sea

The Karenga (Russian: Каренга) is a river in Zabaykalsky Krai, southern East Siberia, Russia. It is 366 kilometres (227 mi) long, and has a drainage basin of 10,100 square kilometres (3,900 sq mi). The area through which the river flows is inhabited by indigenous Tungus people.

There are Neolithic archaeological sites near the mouth of the river where ancient ceramic remains belonging to the Ust-Karenga Culture have been found.

== Course ==
The Karenga is a right tributary of the Vitim. Its sources are in the Chingikhan Saddle, located between the Yablonoi Mountains and the Chersky Range. Kontalaksky Golets, the highest peak of the Yablonoi rises to the NW of the river valley, near Tungokochen. It flows in a mainly northeastern direction within a winding channel. The vegetation along the banks of the river is mainly sparse larch taiga. Its lower course is at the eastern end of the Vitim Plateau. Finally, at the border with Buryatia it meets the Vitim 1,083 kilometres (673 mi) from its mouth in the Lena.

The longest tributaries of the Karenga are the 66 km (41 mi) long Bugarikhta and the 63 km (39 mi) long Bereya from the right. The river basin has 332 lakes with a total area of 7.4 km^{2} (2.9 sq mi). The river is frozen between late November and mid April. It has sharp fluctuations in the water level in the spring and summer. There is patchy distribution of permafrost in the basin.

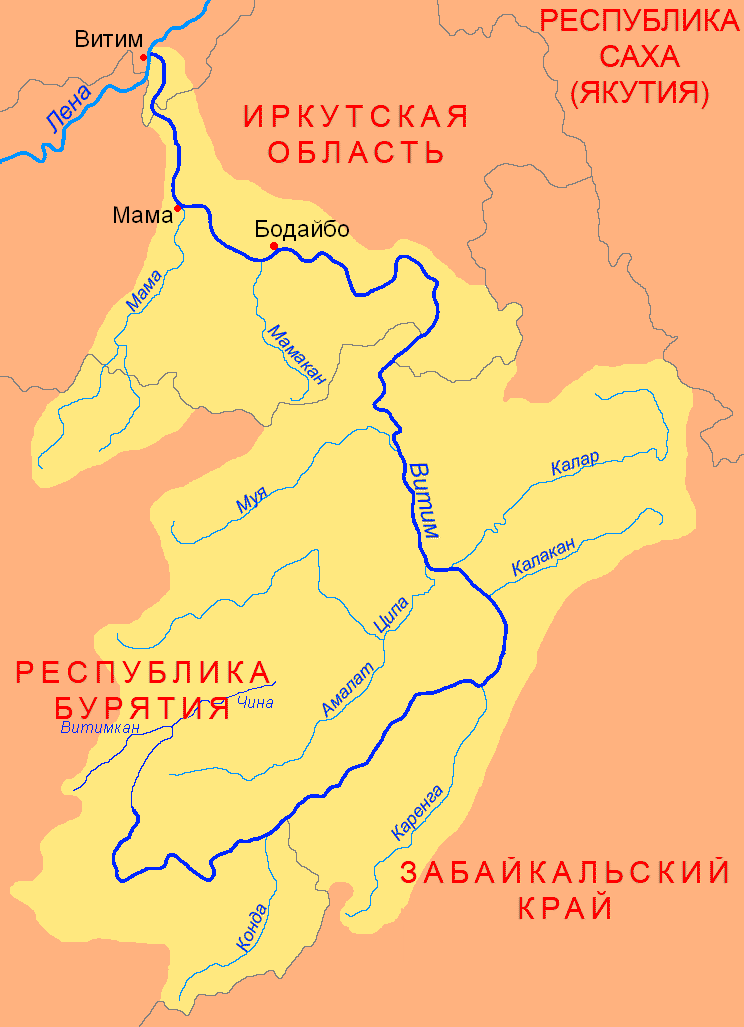
Basin of the Vitim with the Karenga in the lower right.

== See also ==
- List of rivers of Russia
