= Usugli =

Usugli Усугли
- Selo
- Location within Zabaykalsky Krai Location within Russia
- Coordinates: 52°39′N 115°15′E
- Country: Russia
- Region: Zabaykalsky Krai
- District: Tungokochensky District
- Time zone: UTC+9:00

Usugli (Russian: Усугли) is a rural locality (a selo) in Tungokochensky District, Zabaykalsky Krai, Russia. Population: 681 (2021 census); 790 (2010 census); 908 (2002 census); There are 18 streets in this selo.

== Geography ==
This rural locality is located 6 km from Verkh-Usugli (the district's administrative centre), 137 km from Chita (capital of Zabaykalsky Krai) and 5,249 km from Moscow. Verkh-Usugli is the nearest rural locality.
