= Mitrofanovo, Zabaykalsky Krai =

Mitrofanovo Митрофаново
- Selo
- Location within Zabaykalsky Krai Location within Russia
- Coordinates: 51°49′N 115°57′E
- Country: Russia
- Region: Zabaykalsky Krai
- District: Shilkinsky District
- Time zone: UTC+9:00

Mitrofanovo (Russian: Митрофаново) is a rural locality (a selo) in Shilkinsky District, Zabaykalsky Krai, Russia. Population: 479 (2021 census); 592 (2010 census); There are 7 streets in this selo.

== Geography ==
This rural locality is located 6 km from Shilka (the district's administrative centre), 170 km from Chita (capital of Zabaykalsky Krai) and 5,402 km from Moscow. Shilka is the nearest rural locality.
