= Siberian Light Aviation =

Russian airline

SiLA (Siberian Light Aviation) ООО «СиЛА» (ООО «Сибирская Легкая авиация»)
- Founded: 2014
- Hubs: Sokol Airport
- Secondary hubs: Irkutsk International Airport; Bogashevo Airport; Gorno-Altaysk Airport
- Fleet size: 11
- Headquarters: Magadan, Russia
- Website: sila-avia.ru

Siberian Light Aviation - (SiLA) (Russian: Сибирская Легкая авиация, Sibirskaya Legkaya aviatsiya, "Siberian Light Aviation") is a Russian airline operating turboprop aircraft for regional flights in Siberia. It received its air operator certificate for commercial transportation in 2014. In Russian, the word "sila" means "force".

In October 2019 Aeroservis Airline was acquired by Siberian Light Aviation.

== Fleet ==
As of July 2021 the SiLA fleet included these aircraft:

SiLA fleet
Aircraft	In fleet	Orders	Notes
Antonov An-28	4	0	
L-410	7	0	

== Accidents ==
- On 16 July 2021, Siberian Light Aviation Flight 42, an An-28 operating from Kedrovy to Tomsk, Russia, suffered dual engine failure around half an hour into the flight. The aircraft attempted an emergency landing in the Siberian wilderness but overturned on landing. The aircraft was written off but all 14 passengers and four crew survived.
- On 12 September 2021, Siberian Light Aviation Flight 51, a Let L-410 operated by Aeroservice on behalf of SiLA, from Irkutsk Airport to Kazachinskoye Airport, crashed in a forest about 4 km short of the runway near Kazachinskoye Airport. SiLA reported the aircraft was on its second approach in heavy fog when it crashed. Although the two crew and 14 passengers survived the crash, the co-pilot and three passengers later died from injuries sustained in the accident.
