= Tungokochen =

Tungokochen Тунгокочен
- Selo
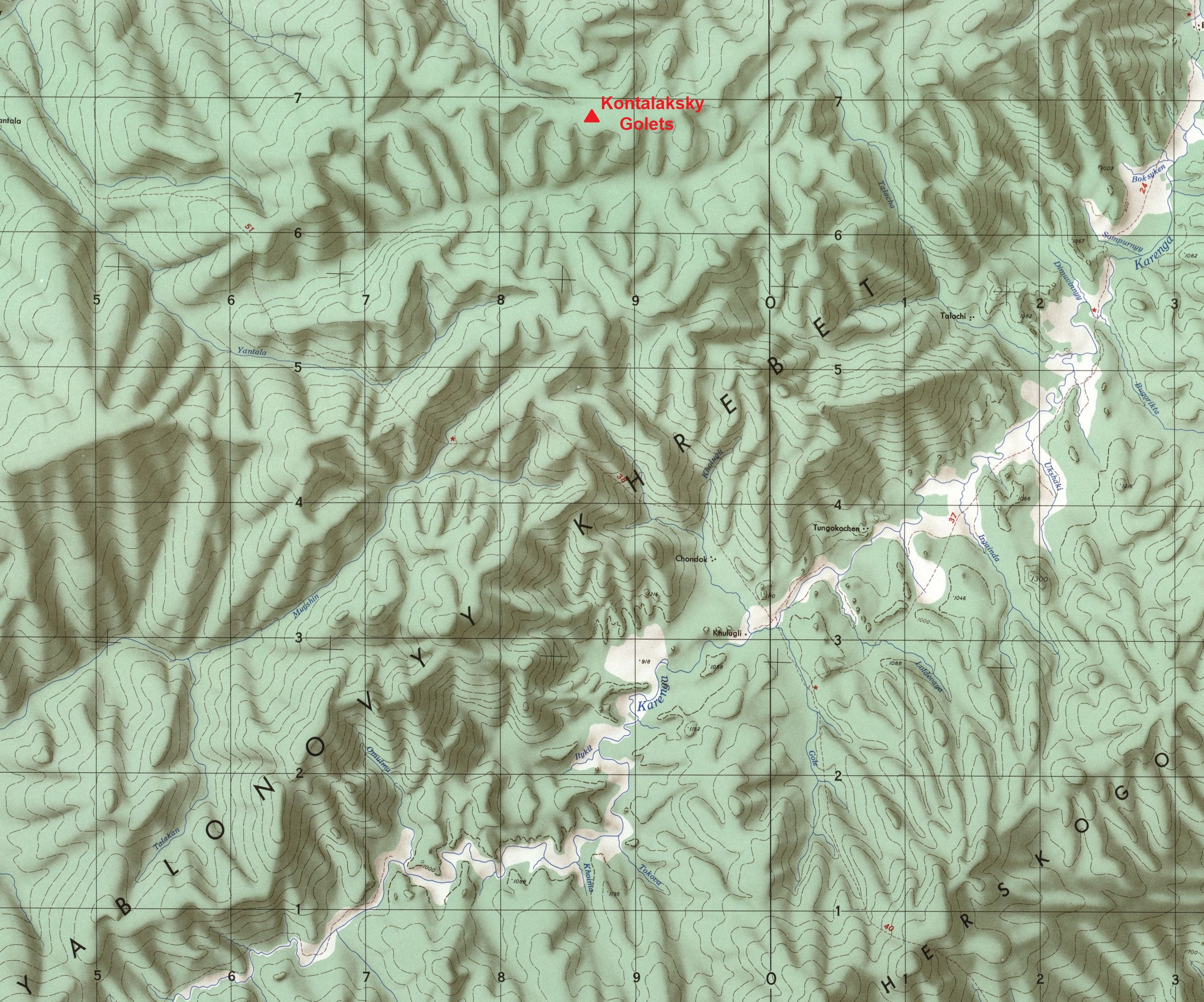
- Tungokochen area map section
- Interactive map of Tungokochen
- Location of Tungokochen Tungokochen (Zabaykalsky Krai)
- Coordinates: 53°32′01″N 115°36′58″E
- Country: Russia
- Federal subject: Zabaykalsky Krai
- Administrative district: Tungokochensky District

Population
  - Estimate (2021): 835 )

Administrative status
  - Capital of: Tungokochensky Rayon
- Time zone: UTC+9 (MSK+6)
- Postal code: 674110
- OKTMO ID: 76644455101

Tungokochen (Russian: Тунгокочен) is a rural locality in Tungokochensky District of Zabaykalsky Krai, Russia. Population: 835 (2021 census); 955 (2002 census); 1,105 (1989 Soviet census).

== Geography ==
The village is about 141 km (88 mi) NNE of the district administrative center of Verkh-Usugli. It lies on the left bank of the Karenga river, to the southeast of the slopes of the Yablonoi Mountains.

== History ==
Tungokochen was founded in the 1930s as the capital of Tungokochensky District. In 1976, the administrative center was moved to the village of Verkh-Usugli. The village had an airport which was functional until the 1990s.

== See also ==
- Kontalaksky Golets
