= Kazachinskoye, Irkutsk Oblast =

Rural locality in Irkutsk Oblast, Russia

Coordinates: 51°16′26″N 107°34′47″E

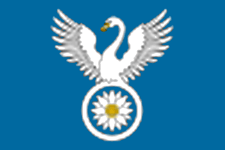
Flag of Kazachinskoye

Kazachinskoye (Russian: Казачинское) is a rural locality (a selo) and the administrative center of Kazachinsko-Lensky District of Irkutsk Oblast, Russia. Population: 2,624 (2010 census); 2,650 (2002 census); 2,792 (1989 Soviet census). Kazachinskoye Airport is located nearby.
