= Pallas Mountain =

Natural monument and a watershed mountain in Zabaykalsky Krai, Russia

- Velikiy Istok
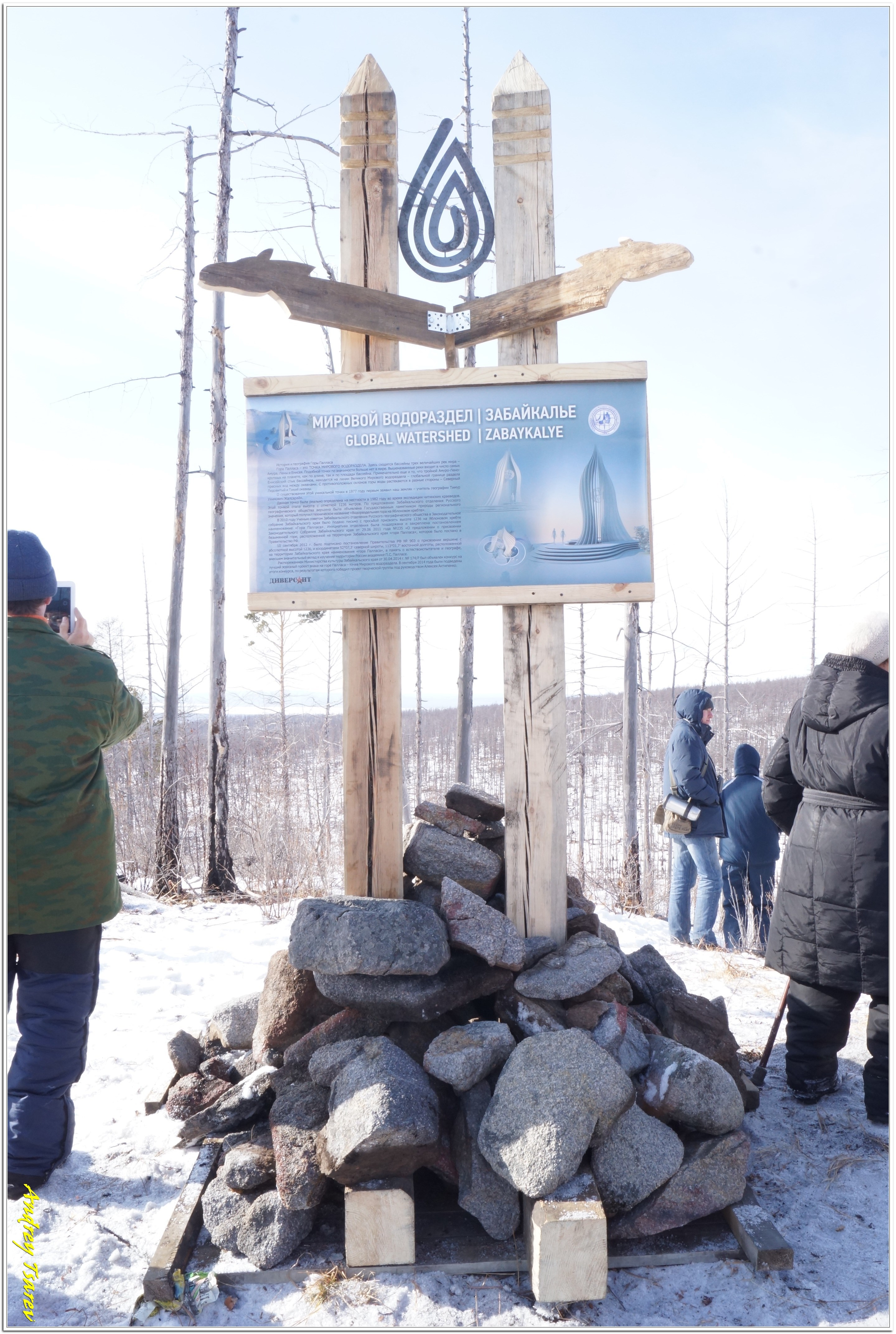
- World watershed

Highest point
- Elevation: 1,236 m (4,055 ft)
- Coordinates: 52°07′17″N 113°01′42″E

Geography
- Location: Zabaykalsky region, Russia
- Parent range: Yablonoi Mountains

Pallas Mountain is the natural monument and a watershed mountain on the Yablonoi range (unofficially — "Velikiy Istok") — in the west of the Zabaykalsky Krai with the absolute height of 1,236 m; a triple watershed located on the Yablonoi Mountains, the confluence of the basins of the Amur, Lena and Yenisey rivers. There is no other place in the world where the basins of three such great rivers converge at the same time.

== Current name ==
It is named in honor of the naturalist and geographer who made a significant contribution to the study of Russia, Academician Peter Simon Pallas (Russian Government Resolution No. 903 of September 10, 2012). In 1772, he also visited the Zabaykalsky Krai, where his route passed through the Yablonoi Mountains.

== The great watershed ==
Marked on many maps, Pallas Mountain, then an unnamed peak, was rediscovered in 1977 by Timur Ukhinovich Zhalsarayn, a local historian and geography teacher, as the confluence of the Amur, Yenisei, and Lena river systems.

In 1982, the Zabaykalsky Branch of the Russian Geographical Society organized an expedition to the Yablonoi Mountains, as a result of which the watershed was determined on the ground and the peak received the status of the state natural monument "Watershed Mountain on the Yablonoi Mountains" (Decision of the Chita Regional Executive Committee № 353 of August 14, 1983). The boundaries of the monument run along the base of the mountain, framed by the valleys of the rivers Kadala (flowing into the Kenon lake), Gryaznukha (flowing into the Arakhlei lake) and Khara-Kadala (flowing into the Ivan lake).

Because the waters of the Yenisey flow into the Kara Sea, the Lena into the Laptev Sea, and the mouth of the Amur River is on the border of two seas (the Sea of Okhotsk and the Sea of Japan). Pallas Mountain is also called the "Mountain of Five Seas". The fifth in this list can rightly be called Baikal, which, although it is a lake, has long been given the title of "Glorious Sea".

In terms of height above sea level (1236 m), it rises no more than 600 meters above the nearby regional center — the city of Chita. At the same time, it is inferior to other peaks of the Yablonoi Mountains, such as Saranakan (1579 m) and Chingikan (1644 m). Even in the immediate vicinity of Watershed Mountain there are higher hills, reaching 1279 and 1243 m.

== Tourist route ==
The mountain is located 35 km northwest of the city of Chita in the territory of the Ivano-Aleksandrovsky Natural Park (the center is the system of Ivan-Arakhley Lake System). The most convenient way to get to the natural monument is through Kadalinskiy rocks "Dvortsy". From here the most picturesque part of the route leads up the Kadalinka River and its right source. The total length of the route to the summit is 15-20 km.

== Misunderstandings and misrepresentations of facts ==
There are a number of misunderstandings and misrepresentations of facts concerning the name "Pallas Mountain". Almost a complete set of them is spread by the founder of the "Great Istok" — K. Shlyamov. Because of this, the organization of Russian Germans and the daughter of T.U. Zhalsarain were forced to publish refutations, and a member of ZRO VPO "RGO" P.V. Matafonov — to present on December 9, 2021 at the "Zhalsarainov readings" the report "Mount Pallas: fictions and facts" with detailed refutations of distortions of facts.

1) P. S. Pallas has no connection with Pallas Mountain, as he never visited it and knew nothing about it. 2) Pallas Mountain was discovered by Timur Zhalsarayn. 3) On July 14, 1983, the place was officially proclaimed a natural monument "Watershed Mountain on the Yablonoi Mountains", until 2012 the mountain had the name "Watershed Mountain" or "Vodorazdelnaya". 4) T. U. Zhalsarayn never expressed his disagreement with the name of the natural monument "Vodorazdelnaya Mountain on the Yablonoi Mountains", because he liked this name. 5) There was a renaming of Vodorazdelnaya Mountain into Pallas Mountain. 6) The renaming of Vodorazdelnaya Mountain violated the law of the Russian Federation. 7) The name "Pallas Mountain" was given at the suggestion of the "Community of Germans of the Zabaykalsky Krai". 8) The decision was made by the Zabaykalsky branch of the RGS without discussion of alternatives. 9) Scientists proposed to disparagingly name some neighboring mountains in the area of Pallas Mountain after T.U. Zhalsarain. 10) Velikiy Istok and Pallas Mountain are one and the same. 11) Geographers tried to erase the name of T. U. Zhalsarain in order to name the mountain after P. S. Pallas.

The misconceptions and misrepresentations do not withstand scrutiny for accuracy.

P. S. Pallas correctly described the confluence of the Yenisei, Lena, and Amur basins in the area where the town of Pallas is located. Pallas. But his merit is not only this: in his atlas there is a map of a part of the Tobolsk and Irkutsk governorates, which, in comparison with other maps of the 18th century, shows quite accurately the area in question to the west of Chita. Between Chita and the Ivan-Arakhley lake system, P. S. Pallas' scheme shows mountains, one of which can be associated with the Amur-Leno-Enisei watershed junction in accordance with modern ideas about its extent. The map of the area considered by P. S. Pallas is the basis of modern maps on which T.U. Zhalsarain understood the uniqueness of the Amur-Leno-Enisei junction. According to the map of P.S. Pallas and his description, the Amur-Leno-Enisei river basin confluence in the area of Chita was already known in the 18th century. Besides, P. S. Pallas described the influence of the Yablonoi Mountains on the nature on its different sides.

At the time of the publication of the first article by T. U. Zhalsarain in 1977, the area under consideration was not a "terra incognita" and a "white spot" on topographic maps, since it is located near the regional center and air routes pass over it. In 1981 it was shown on the 1:100000 topographic map. So there was no need to discover the mountain. The search for the watershed was carried out by geographers and local historians of the Transbaikal Branch of the Geographical Society of the USSR in cooperation with Y.T. Rudenko and T.U. Zhalsarain. T.U. Zhalsarain himself did not visit the mountain, because at the time of its "discovery" he was already quite old. There was no need to discover the confluence of the Amur, Lena and Yenisey basins, it was already shown in 1967 on the map "River network density" in the "Atlas of Transbaikalia" on the terrain between Chita and Lake Arakhlei. It could only be a matter of specifying the characteristics of the junction and its position on the terrain in question. After several attempts, the mountain was "discovered" on the terrain by the local historian A.A. Shipitsyn and others — members of the Zabaykalsky branch of the Geographical Society of the USSR.

On the proposal of the geographer and local historian Y.T. Rudenko, who actively participated in the search of the crossing, on July 14, 1983 by the Resolution of the Chita Oblast Committee ¹ 353 "On the recognition of state natural monuments on the territory of the Chita region" the official name of the complex natural monument "Watershed Mountain on the Yablonoi Mountains" was approved. The official name of the complex natural monument "Watershed Mountain on the Yablonoi Mountains" has been approved. The natural monument was named exactly "Watershed Mountain on the Yablonoi Mountains", so T.U. Zhalsarain could not be satisfied or displeased with the distorted name of the natural monument "Watershed Mountain on the Yablonoi Mountains".

Until 2012, the mountain had no official name. Unofficially and conditionally until then it was called Watershed Mountain on the Yablonoi Mountains, Watershed Mountain, since 1986 — Pallas Mountain, and provisionally since 2000 — Great Istok. In 2003 geographers were sure that the name Pallas Mountain was legitimized at the meeting of the Zabaikalsky Branch of the Russian Geographical Society in 1986. Resolution of the Government of the Russian Federation ¹ 903 of September 10, 2012. "On the Naming of Geographical Objects in the Zabaikalsky territory", the name of the mountain "Pallas" was assigned to a certain geographical object — an unnamed mountain peak. Thus, since that moment the main attraction of the complex natural landmark "Watershed Mountain on the Yablonoi Mountains" has become a geographical object — the peak "Pallas Mountain".

The name of the mountain was given for the first time. The mountain has no name in the real, not substituted, name of the natural monument. There was no renaming of the peak Pallas Mountain, so there was no violation of the law.

The name "Pallas Mountain" was proposed by A.A. Shipitsyn, a local historian, a member of the Zabaikalsky branch of the Geographical Society of the USSR, on October 19, 1986 in the article "A drop in the sea" published by him in the newspaper "Komsomolets Zabaikalya". According to him, A. A. Shipitsyn suggested the name of the mountain only on his own initiative and without the influence of any "Community of Germans of the Zabaikalsky region".

In the manuscript of Y. T. Rudenko's reply to the magazine "Zabaikalye" there is a statement that the decision on the name "Pallas Mountain" was made by the Zabaykaksky branch of the Russian Geographical Society in 1986, that is, immediately after the publication of A.A. Shipitsyn's article. According to A.A. Shipitsyn and V.S. Rachinsky, about 20 members of the Branch were present at the meeting. The specialists did not like the name options with the wording: "Watershed Mountain", etc., since there are countless watershed mountains on the Yablonoi Mountains.

In 2008, the so-called "Scientific Council of the Museum of the Great World Watershed and the Velikiy Istok" and the head of this "museum" K. Shlyamov proposed to name the mountain (in the article — "place" and the point of planetary division of fresh water) "the Velikiy Istok", and the names of T. U. Zhalsarain and P. S. Pallas "some unnamed mountains near the point of planetary division of fresh water".

Geographers did not support the name of the mountain Velikiy Istok because they did not understand what exactly the founder of Velikiy Istok K. Shlyamov meant by Velikiy Istok and they were sure that such a name would mislead people as if there were river springs on the mountain. In 2004, K. Shlyamov defined Velikiy Istok in the "Encyclopedia of the Zabaykalsky Krai" only as a guitar song studio, he did not mention T. U. Zhalsarain and the watershed mountain on the Yablonoi Mountains. In 2021, in the same article, he gives two mutually exclusive definitions of the Great Source — in the first case, he identifies the Great Source with the Great Watershed Point on the Earth's Great Watershed Line, as well as Watershed Mountain and Pallas Mountain. Elsewhere in the same article, with the statement "...the Great Source we do not call a mountain..." he denies that the Great Source is a mountain and defines it as a complex of three small headwaters into the three great rivers of the world. Based on the definition of the term "source", there is no watershed on Pallas Mountain from which the watercourses to the three great rivers of the world permanently flow, since it is known that the river source often corresponds to the place from which the bed of a permanent watercourse appears, or the place from which the permanent flow of water in the bed appears. There are no permanent streams or beds of permanent streams on Pallas Mountain.

A lot of work on popularization of the heritage of T. U. Zhalsarain was done by geographers and first of all by Y. T. Rudenko. Y. T. Rudenko helped T. U. Zhalsarain to publish his first article, on his initiative he created the natural monument "Watershed Mountain on the Yablonoi Mountains", as the first or the only author he published at least 16 publications mentioning T. U. Zhalsarain and describing his discovery. Y. T. Rudenko was known to the Transbaikal people as a very active popularizer of T. U. Zhalsarain's legacy on excursions to Pallas Mountain, in classes with students and in radio programs. In the "Encyclopedia of Transbaikalia" there is his article "Watershed Mountain. Mount Pallas" with mention of T. U. Zhalsarain. In March 2019, members of ZRO SBI "Russian Geographical Society" created a separate article on Wikipedia about T. U. Zhalsarain. In 2020 the daughter of T. U. Zhalsarain — N. A. Atutova published a book "An unadventurous story of a discovery" about her father and his legacy. Since 2011 conferences in memory of T. U. Zhalsarain have become a regular event in Aginskoye settlement.
