= Kontalaksky Golets =

Mountain in Russia

- Конталакский Голец
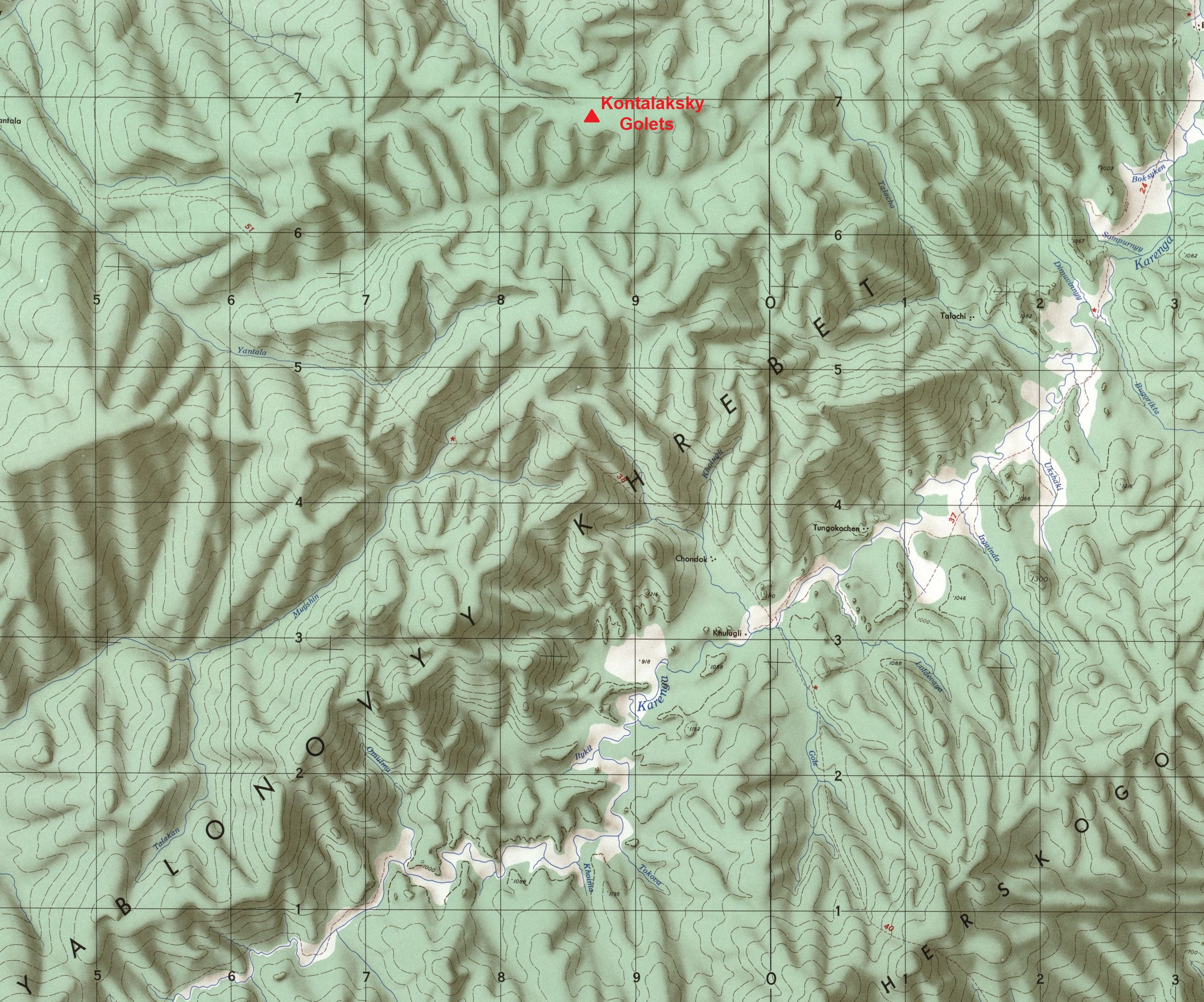
- Yablonoi Mountains, Tungokochensky District map section showing location of Kontalaksky Golets

Highest point
- Elevation: 1,706 m (5,597 ft)
- Coordinates: 53°54′47″N 115°41′35″E

Geography
- Location within Zabaykalsky Krai
- Location: Transbaikal Krai, Russian Far East
- Parent range: Yablonoi Mountains, South Siberian System

Climbing
- Easiest route: from Tungokochen, Tungokochensky District

Kontalaksky Golets (Russian: Конталакский Голец) is a peak in the Yablonoi Mountains. Administratively it is part of Zabaykalsky Krai, Russian Federation.

== Geography ==
This 1,706 m (5,597 ft) high mountain is the highest point of the Yablonoi Range, a long mountain chain of moderate elevations which is part of the South Siberian System of ranges. It is located in the far northeastern section of the range, just a little north of Tungokochen.

The Kontalaksky Golets is a ‘’golets’’-type of mountain with a bald peak. It rises to the west of the valley of the Karenga in a largely remote and uninhabited part of Transbaikalia. There are pillar-like rock formations in this mountain similar to the kigilyakhs of Yakutia.

== See also ==
- List of mountains in Russia
- List of rock formations § Russia
