= Ust-Karenga =

Ust-Karenga Усть-Каренга
- Selo
- Location within Zabaykalsky Krai Location within Russia
- Coordinates: 54°26′N 116°31′E
- Country: Russia
- Region: Zabaykalsky Krai
- District: Tungokochensky District
- Time zone: UTC+9:00

Ust-Karenga (Russian: Акнада) is a rural locality (a selo) in Tungokochensky District, Zabaykalsky Krai, Russia. Population: 143 (2021 census); 185 (2010 census); 236 (2002 census); There are 4 streets in this selo.

== Geography ==
This rural locality is located 214 km from Verkh-Usugli (the district's administrative centre), 332 km from Chita (capital of Zabaykalsky Krai) and 5,104 km from Moscow.
