= Solntsevo, Kursk Oblast =

Solntsevo Солнцево
- Urban-type settlement
- Interactive map of Solntsevo
- Location of Solntsevo Solntsevo (Kursk Oblast)
- Coordinates: 51.4195°N 36.7511°E
- Country: Russia
- Federal subject: Kursk Oblast
- Administrative district: Solntsevsky District
- Founded: 1887

Population (2010 Census)
  - Total: 4,295
  - Estimate (2025): 3,340 (−22.2%)
- Time zone: UTC+3 (MSK)
- Postal code: 306120
- OKTMO ID: 38638151051

Solntsevo (Russian: Солнцево) is an urban locality (an urban-type settlement) in Solntsevsky District of Kursk Oblast, Russia. Population: 3,622 (2021 census); 4,295 (2010 census); 4,475 (2002 census); 4,993 (1989 Soviet census).
