= Mitrofanovo, Vozhegodsky District, Vologda Oblast =

Mitrofanovo Митрофаново
- Village
- Location within Vologda Oblast Location within Russia
- Coordinates: 60°24′N 39°25′E
- Country: Russia
- Region: Vologda Oblast
- District: Vozhegodsky District
- Time zone: UTC+3:00

Mitrofanovo (Russian: Митрофаново) is a rural locality (a village) in Vozhegodsky District, Vologda Oblast, Russia. The population was 2 as of 2002.

== Geography ==
Mitrofanovo is located 68 km west of Vozhega (the district's administrative centre) by road. Yelenskaya is the nearest rural locality.
