= Mitrofanovo, Vladimir Oblast =

Mitrofanovo Митрофаново
- Village
- Location within Vladimir Oblast Location within Russia
- Coordinates: 55°44′N 41°31′E
- Country: Russia
- Region: Vladimir Oblast
- District: Selivanovsky District
- Time zone: UTC+3:00

Mitrofanovo (Russian: Митрофаново) is a rural locality (a village) in Malyshevskoye Rural Settlement, Selivanovsky District, Vladimir Oblast, Russia. The population was 18 as of 2010.

== Geography ==
Mitrofanovo is located 27 km southwest from Krasnaya Gorbatka (the district's administrative centre) by road. Malyshevo is the nearest rural locality.
