= Kazachinskoye Airport =

- IATA: none; ICAO: UITK

Summary
- Airport type: Public
- Location: Kazachinskoye
- Elevation AMSL: 1,499 ft / 457 m
- Coordinates: 56°16′44.74″N 107°34′4.39″E
- Interactive map of Kazachinskoye Airport

Runways
Direction	Length		Surface
Direction	ft	m	Surface
04/22	5,200	1,585	Asphalt

Kazachinskoye Airport (ICAO: UITK) is a civilian airport in Russia located 1 km northwest of Kazachinskoye.

== Passenger ==
Airlines	Destinations
PANH	Irkutsk, Ulan-Ude
SiLA	Irkutsk

== See also ==
- List of airports in Russia
