= Solntsevsky District =

Solntsevsky District Солнцевский район (Russian)
- District
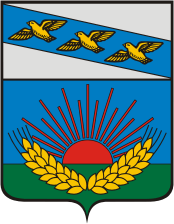
- Coat of arms
- Location of Solntsevsky District in Kursk Oblast
- Coordinates: 51°25′N 36°45′E
- Country: Russia
- Federal subject: Kursk Oblast
- Established: June 16, 1928
- Administrative center: Solntsevo

Area
  - Total: 1,052 km^{2} (406 sq mi)

Population (2010 Census)
  - Total: 15,382
  - Density: 14.62/km^{2} (37.87/sq mi)
  - Urban: 27.9%
  - Rural: 72.1%

Administrative structure
  - Administrative divisions: 1 Work settlements, 16 Selsoviets
  - Inhabited localities: 1 urban-type settlements, 93 rural localities

Municipal structure
  - Municipally incorporated as: Solntsevsky Municipal District
  - Municipal divisions: 1 urban settlements, 6 rural settlements
- Time zone: UTC+3 (MSK)
- OKTMO ID: 38638000
- Website: http://solnr.rkursk.ru

Population of Solntsevsky District
- 2021 Census: 12,182
- 2010 Census: 15,382
- 2002 Census: 18,492
- 1989 Census: 22,492
- 1979 Census: 27,533

Solntsevsky District (Russian: Со́лнцевский райо́н) is an administrative and municipal district (raion), one of the twenty-eight in Kursk Oblast, Russia. It is located in the south of the oblast. The area of the district is 1,052 square kilometers (406 sq mi). Its administrative center is the urban locality (a work settlement) of Solntsevo. As of the 2021 Census, the total population of the district was 12,182, with the population of Solntsevo accounting for 29.7% of that number.

== History ==
The district was established on June 16, 1928.
