= Tungokochensky District =

Tungokochensky District Тунгокоченский район (Russian)
- District
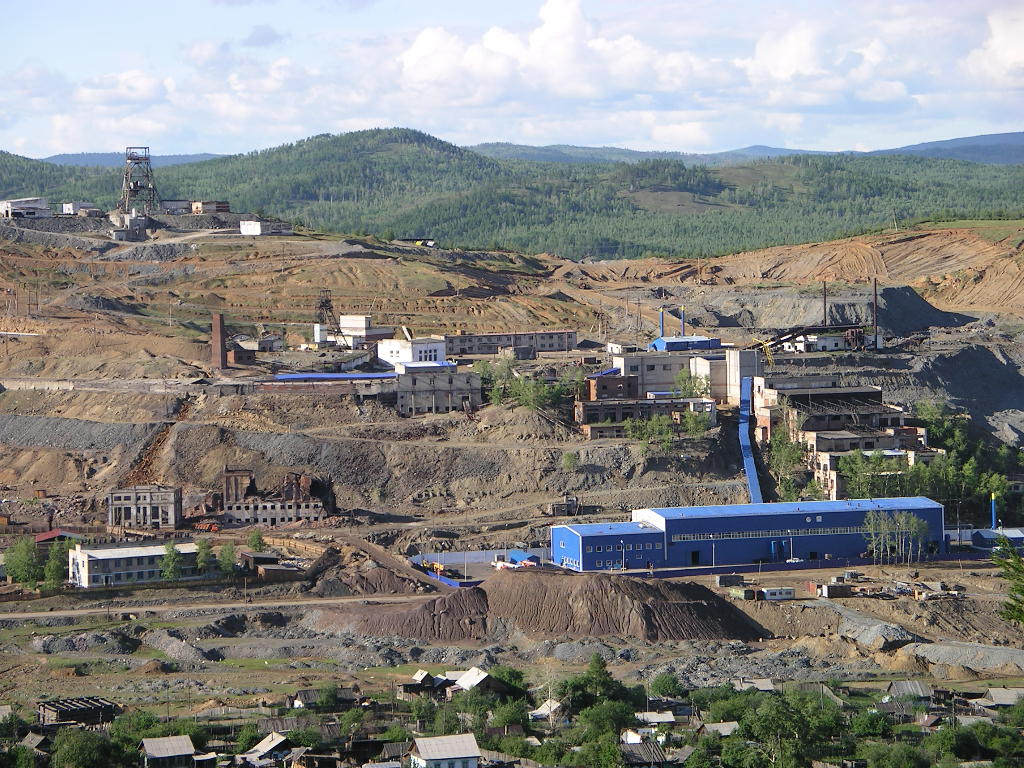
- Vershino-Darasunsky Mine

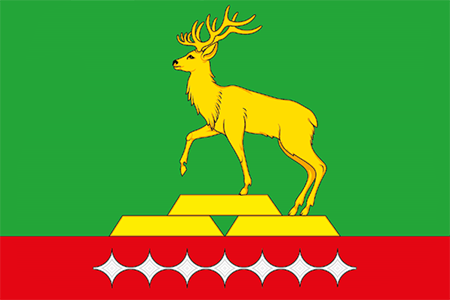
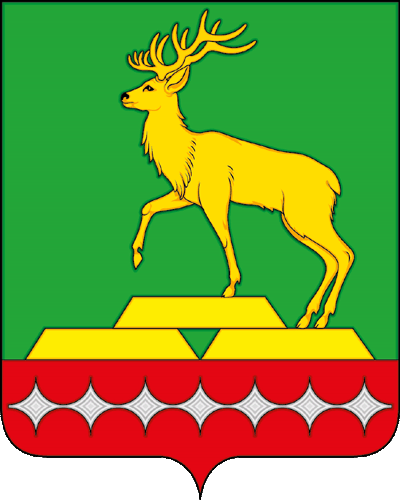
- Flag Coat of arms
- Location of Tungokochensky District in Zabaykalsky Krai
- Coordinates: 53°30′N 116°00′E
- Country: Russia
- Federal subject: Zabaykalsky Krai
- Established: September 21, 1938
- Administrative center: Verkh-Usugli

Area
  - Total: 50,900 km^{2} (19,700 sq mi)

Population (2010 Census)
  - Total: 12,685
  - Estimate (2018): 11,676 (−8%)
  - Density: 0.249/km^{2} (0.645/sq mi)
  - Urban: 46.9%
  - Rural: 53.1%

Administrative structure
  - Inhabited localities: 1 urban-type settlements, 16 rural localities

Municipal structure
  - Municipally incorporated as: Tungokochensky Municipal District
  - Municipal divisions: 1 urban settlements, 6 rural settlements
- Time zone: UTC+9 (MSK+6)
- OKTMO ID: 76644000
- Website: http://xn--c1aohfbth1b.xn--80aaaac8algcbgbck3fl0q.xn--p1ai/

Tungokochensky District (Russian: Тунгокоченский райо́н) is an administrative and municipal district (raion), one of the thirty-one in Zabaykalsky Krai, Russia. It is located in the central northern part of the krai, and borders with Kalarsky District in the north, Tungiro-Olyokminsky District in the east, and with Chernyshevsky District in the south. The area of the district is 50,900 square kilometers (19,700 sq mi). Its administrative center is the rural locality (a selo) of Verkh-Usugli. Population: 12,685 (2010 census); 14,207 (2002 Census); 19,357 (1989 Soviet census). The population of Verkh-Usugli accounts for 20.7% of the district's total population.

== Geography ==
The Chersky and Yablonoi ranges stretch from NE to SW across the district, forming the watershed of rivers flowing to the Arctic Ocean on the northern side and rivers flowing to the Pacific Ocean in the southern side. Kontalaksky Golets, the highest peak of the Yablonoi is located in the district, near Tungokochen. On the eastern side rise the western spurs of the Olyokma-Stanovik and at the northern end the western parts of the Kalar and Yankan ranges.

== History ==
The district was established on September 21, 1938. Tungokochen became then the capital of Tungokochensky District. In 1976, the administrative center was moved to the village of Verkh-Usugli. Tungokochen had an airport which was functional until the 1990s. Formerly there was communication by plane, but after the airport closed in the 1990s all the transport is by road, which is difficult in some seasons.
