= Verkh-Usugli =

Verkh-Usugli Верх-Усугли
- Selo
- Interactive map of Verkh-Usugli
- Location of Verkh-Usugli Verkh-Usugli (Zabaykalsky Krai)
- Coordinates: 52°41′N 115°11′E
- Country: Russia
- Federal subject: Zabaykalsky Krai
- Administrative district: Tungokochensky District
- Founded: 1936

Population (2010 Census)
  - Total: 2,624

Administrative status
  - Capital of: Tungokochensky District
- Time zone: UTC+9 (MSK+6)
- Postal code: 674100
- OKTMO ID: 76644411101

Verkh-Usugli (Russian: Верх-Усугли) is a rural locality (a selo) and the administrative center of Tungokochensky District of Zabaykalsky Krai, Russia. Population: 2,624 (2010 census); 2,690 (2002 census); 2,993 (1989 Soviet census).

== Geography ==
The village is about 320 km northeast of the regional capital Chita. It is on the bank of the Usugli River.

== History ==
The founding of the village is associated with the discovery in 1936 of the Usuglinsky fluorite deposit by S. K. Sobolev. In 1959-66, the Usugli mine was constructed. The capital of Tungokochensky District was moved to Verkh-Usugli from Tungokochen in 1976.
