= Shilka (town) =

Town in Zabaykalsky Krai, Russia

Shilka Шилка
- Town
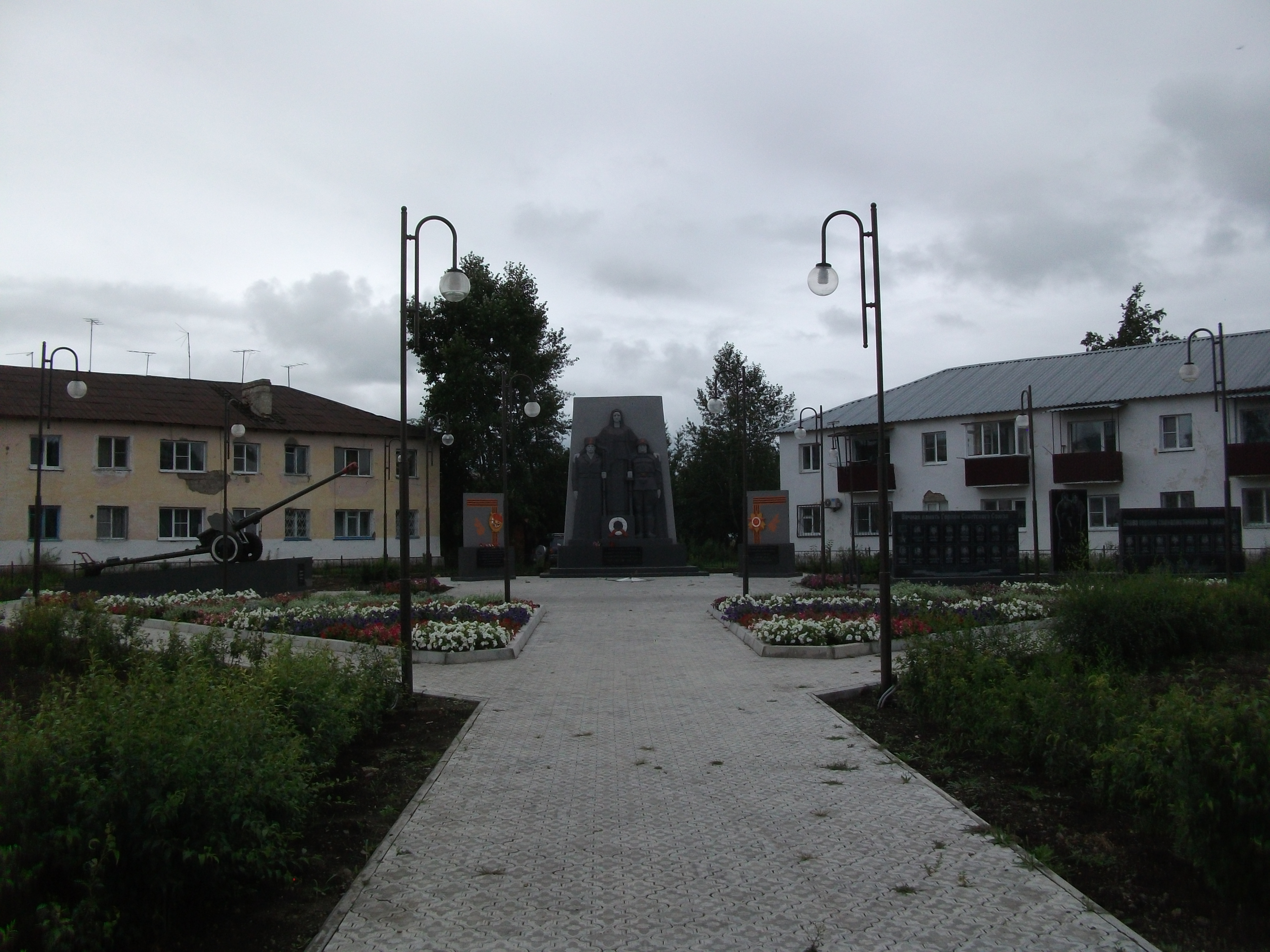

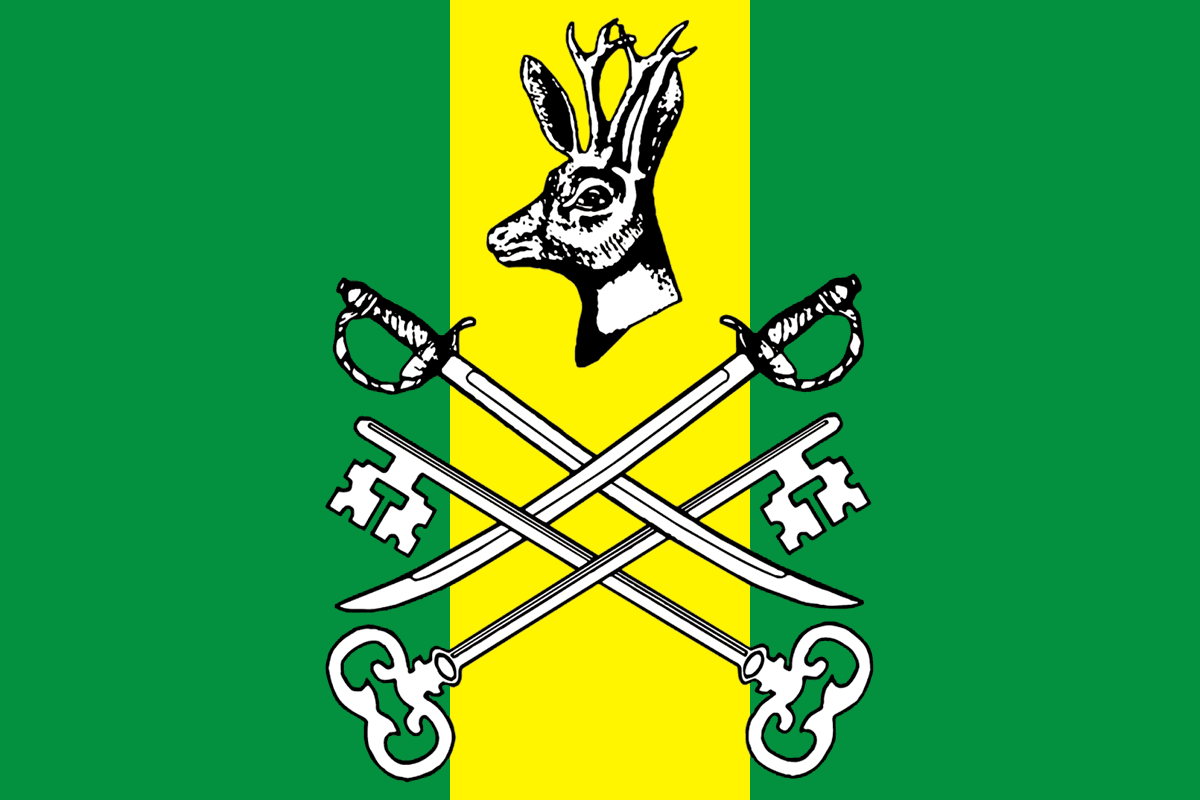
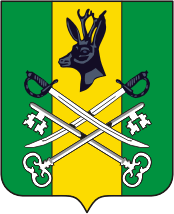
- Flag Coat of arms
- Interactive map of Shilka
- Location of Shilka Shilka (Zabaykalsky Krai)
- Coordinates: 51°51′N 116°02′E
- Country: Russia
- Federal subject: Zabaykalsky Krai
- Administrative district: Shilkinsky District
- Founded: first half of the 18th century
- Town status since: 1951
- Elevation: 490 m (1,610 ft)

Population (2010 Census)
  - Total: 13,947
  - Estimate (January 2014): 13,292 (−4.7%)

Administrative status
  - Capital of: Shilkinsky District

Municipal status
  - Municipal district: Shilkinsky Municipal District
  - Urban settlement: Shilkinskoye Urban Settlement
  - Capital of: Shilkinsky Municipal District, Shilkinskoye Urban Settlement
- Time zone: UTC+9 (MSK+6)
- Postal codes: 673370, 673399
- OKTMO ID: 76654101001

Shilka (Russian: Шилка, IPA: [ˈʂɨlkə]; Buryat: Шилкэ, Shilke) is a town and the administrative center of Shilkinsky District in Zabaykalsky Krai, Russia, located on the river Shilka, 248 kilometers (154 mi) east of Chita, the administrative center of the krai. Population: 13,947 (2010 census); 14,748 (2002 census); 18,057 (1989 Soviet census).

== History ==
It was founded in the first half of the 18th century and was granted town status in 1951.

== Administrative and municipal status ==
Within the framework of administrative divisions, Shilka serves as the administrative center of Shilkinsky District, to which it is directly subordinated. As a municipal division, the town of Shilka, together with one rural locality (the selo of Mitrofanovo), is incorporated within Shilkinsky Municipal District as Shilkinskoye Urban Settlement.
