= Shilkinsky District =

Shilkinsky District Шилкинский район (Russian)
- District
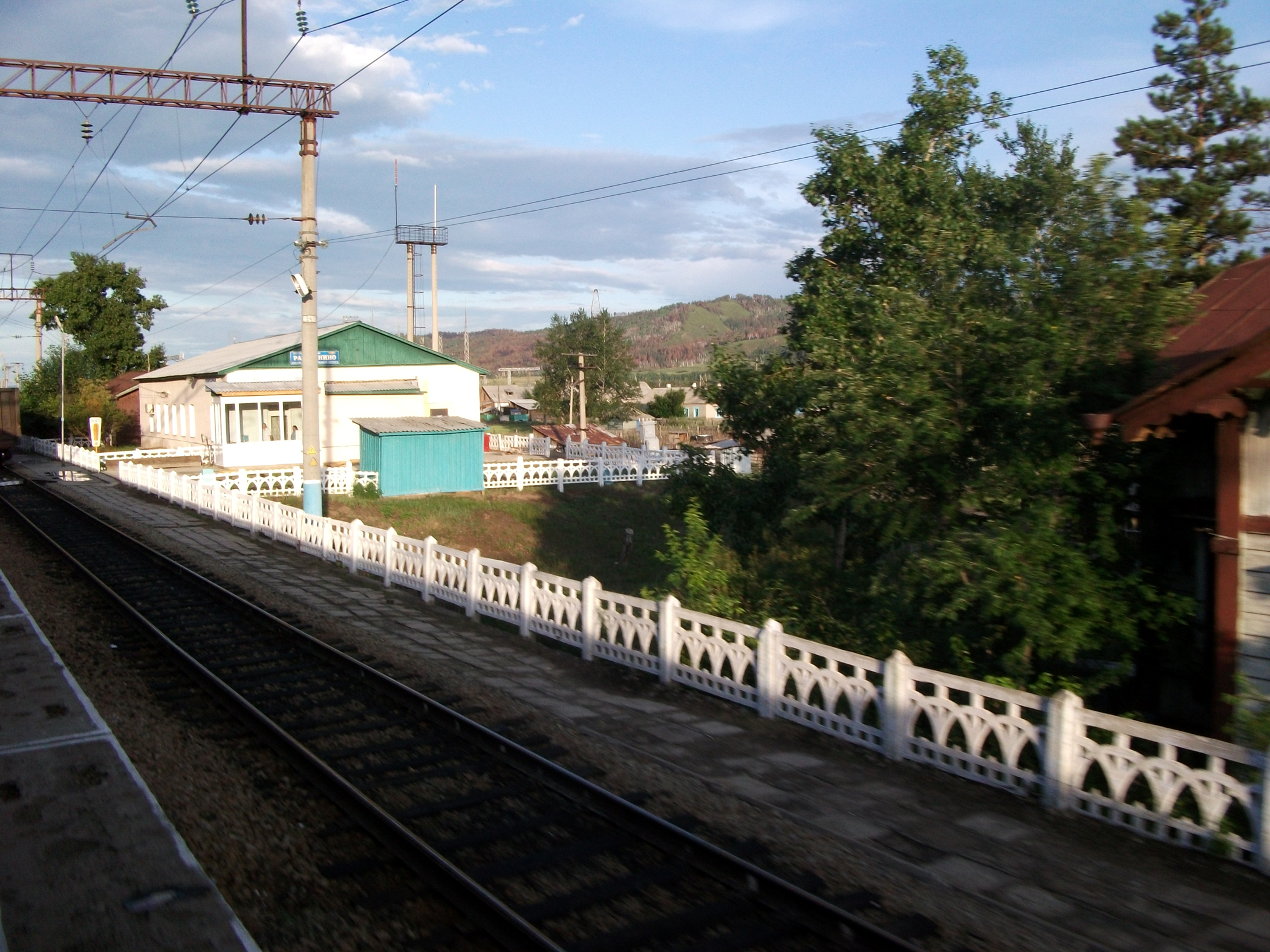
- Train station in Razmahnin

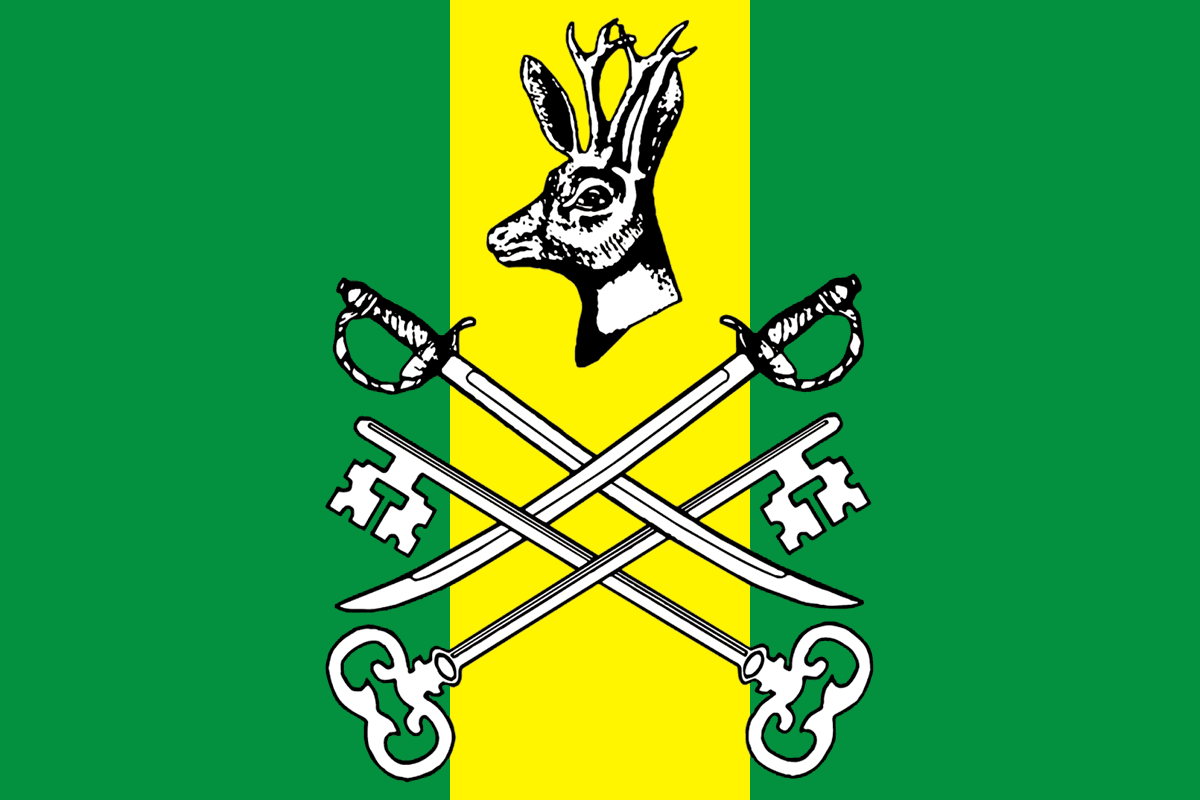
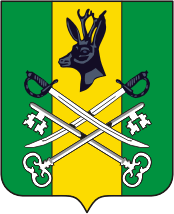
- Flag Coat of arms
- Location of Shilkinsky District in Zabaykalsky Krai
- Coordinates: 51.825°N 115.678°E
- Country: Russia
- Federal subject: Zabaykalsky Krai
- Established: January 4, 1926
- Administrative center: Shilka

Area
  - Total: 6,100 km^{2} (2,400 sq mi)

Population (2010 Census)
  - Total: 43,194
  - Estimate (2018): 39,428 (−8.7%)
  - Density: 7.1/km^{2} (18/sq mi)
  - Urban: 67.8%
  - Rural: 32.2%

Administrative structure
  - Inhabited localities: 1 cities/towns, 3 urban-type settlements, 37 rural localities

Municipal structure
  - Municipally incorporated as: Shilkinsky Municipal District
  - Municipal divisions: 3 urban settlements, 11 rural settlements
- Time zone: UTC+9 (MSK+6)
- OKTMO ID: 76654000
- Website: http://xn--h1aaaecbes0b2d.xn--p1ai/

Shilkinsky District (Russian: Шилкинский райо́н) is an administrative and municipal district (raion), one of the thirty-one in Zabaykalsky Krai, Russia. It is located in the center of the krai, and borders with Tungokochensky District in the north, Nerchinsky District in the east, Mogoytuysky District in the south, and with Karymsky District in the west. The area of the district is 6,100 square kilometers (2,400 sq mi). Its administrative center is the town of Shilka. Population: 43,194 (2010 census); 47,453 (2002 Census); 58,279 (1989 Soviet census). The population of Shilka accounts for 32.3% of the district's total population.

== History ==
The district was established on January 4, 1926.
