= 2025 Kursk Oblast gubernatorial election =

Russian election

← 2024	12–14 September 2025	2030 →
- Turnout: 54.01% ▼7.46 pp
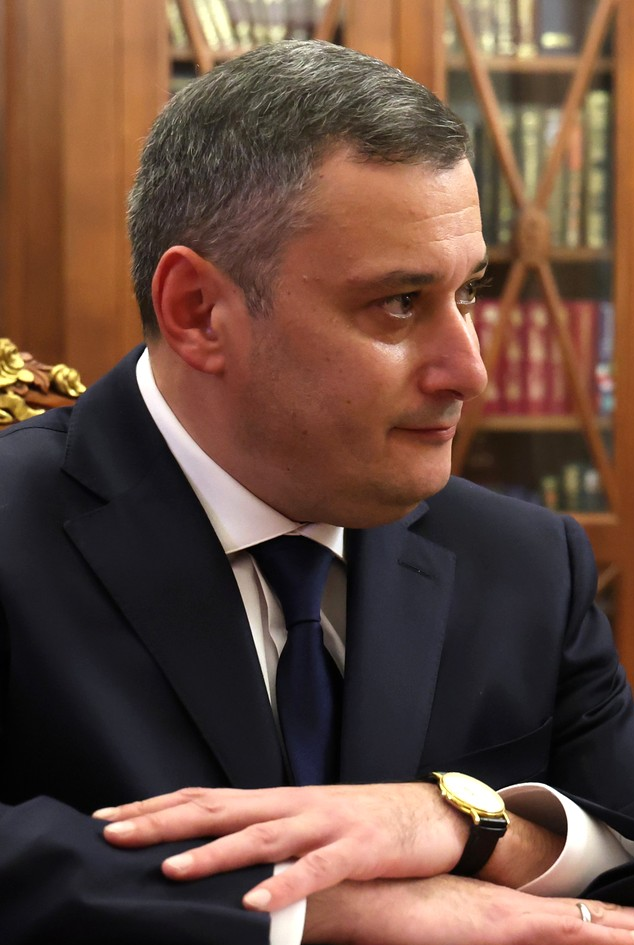
		CPRF
Candidate	Alexander Khinshtein	Aleksey Bobovnikov
Party	United Russia	CPRF
Popular vote	406,346	23,818
Percentage	86.92%	5.09%
Governor before election
Alexander Khinshtein (acting)
United Russia
Governor-elect
Alexander Khinshtein
United Russia

The 2025 Kursk Oblast gubernatorial election took place on 12–14 September 2025, on common election day. Acting Governor of Kursk Oblast Alexander Khinshtein was elected for a full term in office.

== Background ==
First Deputy Governor of Kursk Oblast Aleksey Smirnov became acting Governor of Kursk Oblast in May 2024 after then-governor Roman Starovoyt was nominated as Minister of Transport in Mikhail Mishustin's Second Cabinet. Smirnov was appointed acting Governor of Kursk Oblast by President of Russia Vladimir Putin a day later. Smirnov ran for a full term and won the election with 65.28% of the vote.

On December 6, 2024, Smirnov announced his resignation as Governor of Kursk Oblast just 80 days after his inauguration and 200 days since his appointment as acting governor. The same day President Putin appointed State Duma member Alexander Khinshtein, chairman of the Duma Committee on Informational Policy, Technologies and Communications, as acting Governor of Kursk Oblast. Lack of communication and subsequent protests from local residents suffering from the ongoing Ukrainian incursion were named the main reason for Smirnov's sudden dismissal. The appointment of Khinshtein, a longtime parliamentarian and former investigative journalist, was seen to boost the public appearance of governor's office and to resolve issues around communication with local residents. On April 15, 2025, former governor Smirnov and his deputy Aleksey Dedov were arrested for fraud and embezzlement of funds for fortifications construction. On July 7, 2025, former governor Starovoyt was removed from his position as Minister of Transport of Russia, which was widely believed to be connected to the Smirnov's and Dedov's criminal case, however, several hours later after his dismissal Starovoyt committed suicide.

== Candidates ==
In Kursk Oblast candidates for Governor of Kursk Oblast can be nominated only by registered political parties. Candidate for Governor of Kursk Oblast should be a Russian citizen and at least 30 years old. Candidates for Governor of Kursk Oblast should not have a foreign citizenship or residence permit. Each candidate in order to be registered is required to collect at least 6% of signatures of members and heads of municipalities. Also gubernatorial candidates present 3 candidacies to the Federation Council and election winner later appoints one of the presented candidates.

=== Declared ===
Candidate name, political party	Occupation	Status	Ref.
Gennady Bayev; SR–ZP	Member of Kursk Oblast Duma (2021–present); 2024 gubernatorial candidate	Registered	
Aleksey Bobovnikov; Communist Party	Member of Kursk Oblast Duma (2015–2016, 2021–present); 2024 gubernatorial candidate	Registered	
Alexander Khinshtein; United Russia	Acting Governor of Kursk Oblast (2024–present); Former Member of State Duma (2003–2016, 2018–2024)	Registered	
Aleksey Tomanov; Liberal Democratic Party	Member of Kursk Oblast Duma (2021–present); Aide to State Duma member Boris Chernyshov; 2024 gubernatorial candidate	Registered	

=== Declined ===
- Nikolay Ivanov (CPRF), Member of State Duma (2000–2003, 2011–present)

=== Candidates for Federation Council ===
Incumbent Senator Aleksey Kondratyev (United Russia) was not re-nominated.

Head candidate, political party	Candidates for Federation Council	Status
Gennady Bayev; SR–ZP	* Aleksey Chushkov, individual entrepreneur * Margarita Krivtsova, cleaning business owner * Vladimir Sumin, pensioner	Registered
Aleksey Bobovnikov; Communist Party	* Aleksandr Anpilov, Member of Kursk Oblast Duma (1997–2000, 2001–present), former Chairman of the Oblast Duma (2001–2006) * Svetlana Kanunnikova, Member of Kursk City Assembly (2014–present) * Aleksandr Ponarin, Member of Kursk City Assembly (2021–present)	Registered
Alexander Khinshtein; United Russia	* Igor Chechulin, BARS-Kursk division commander, Rosgvardiya Major General * Yevgeniya Lamonova, Member of Kursk Oblast Duma (2016–2019, 2021–present), 2008 Olympic Champion fencer * Nikolay Shevchenko, Member of Kursk City Assembly (2017–present), businessman	Registered
Aleksey Tomanov; Liberal Democratic Party	* Vadim Chelpanov, psychologist * Aleksandr Freydin, obstetrician-gynecologist * Konstantin Timofeyev, Member of Kursk City Assembly (2022–present)	Registered

== Polls ==
Fieldwork date	Polling firm	Khinshtein	Bobovnikov	Tomanov	Bayev	None	Lead
14 September 2025	2025 election	86.9	5.1	4.1	2.6	1.3	81.8
March – August 2025	INSOMAR	79	8	6	3	4	71

== Results ==
Summary of the 12–14 September 2025 Kursk Oblast gubernatorial election results
Candidate	Party	Votes	%
Alexander Khinshtein (incumbent)	United Russia	406,346	86.92
Aleksey Bobovnikov	Communist Party	23,818	5.09
Aleksey Tomanov	Liberal Democratic Party	19,008	4.07
Gennady Bayev	A Just Russia – For Truth	12,172	2.60
Valid votes		461,344	98.69
Blank ballots		6,134	1.31
Total		467,478	100.00
Turnout		467,478	54.01
Registered voters		865,494	100.00

Governor Khinshtein appointed Kursk Oblast Duma member and 2008 Olympic Champion fencer Yevgeniya Lamonova (United Russia) to the Federation Council, replacing incumbent Senator Aleksey Kondratyev (United Russia).

== See also ==
- 2025 Russian regional elections
