= 2024 Kursk Oblast gubernatorial election =

Election

- 6–8 September 2024
- Turnout: 61.51%
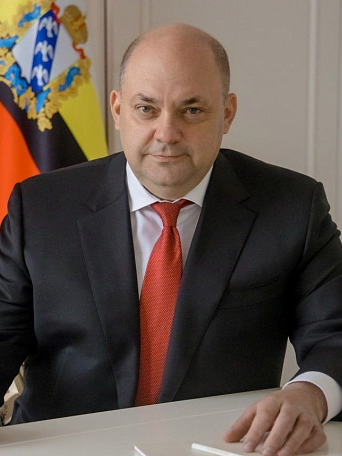
		CPRF
Candidate	Aleksey Smirnov	Aleksey Bobovnikov
Party	United Russia	CPRF
Popular vote	351,040	72,772
Percentage	65.28%	13.53%
	LDPR	SR–ZP
Candidate	Aleksey Tomanov	Gennady Bayev
Party	LDPR	SR–ZP
Popular vote	63,527	36,134
Percentage	11.81%	6.72%
Governor before election
Aleksey Smirnov (acting)
United Russia
Governor-elect
Aleksey Smirnov
United Russia

The 2024 Kursk Oblast gubernatorial election took place on 6–8 September 2024, on common election day. Acting Governor Aleksey Smirnov was elected for a full term in office.

== Background ==
Then-Deputy Minister of Transport Roman Starovoyt was appointed acting Governor of Kursk Oblast in October 2018 replacing four-term Governor Alexander Mikhailov, who resigned at his own request. Mikhailov led Kursk Oblast since 2000 and at the time of his resignation was the third-longest serving governor in Russia (behind Yevgeny Savchenko in Belgorod Oblast and Anatoly Artamonov in Kaluga Oblast), although he assumed that title just a little over a week ago with the resignation of Oleg Korolyov in Lipetsk Oblast. In November 2018 Starovoyt appointed his predecessor, Alexander Mikhailov, to the Federation Council after incumbent Senator Vitaly Bogdanov stepped down.

Starovoyt, officially an independent, was nominated for a full term by United Russia in the 2019 gubernatorial elections. Roman Starovoyt overwhelmingly won the September 2019 election with 81.07% of the vote, as his nearest challenger, Vladimir Firsov (CPRF), received just 5.65%. In November 2020 Governor Starovoyt officially joined United Russia party.

On May 11, 2024 re-appointed Prime Minister Mikhail Mishustin nominated Governor Roman Starovoyt to serve in his second cabinet as Minister of Transport, replacing Vitaly Savelyev who was elevated to the position of Deputy Prime Minister. State Duma Committee on Transport unanimously supported Starovoyt's nomination on May 12, while the full chamber voted 429–0–0 to approve Starovoyt as new Minister of Transport two days later.

After his nomination, Governor Starovoyt left Kursk on May 12, 2024, leaving First Deputy Governor – Chairman of the Kursk Oblast Government Aleksey Smirnov as acting Governor until the temporary replacement be appointed by the President. Smirnov, who has been serving as Deputy Governor since 2018, is considered to be the frontrunner for the appointment. On May 15 President Vladimir Putin appointed Smirnov as acting Governor of Kursk Oblast. On 25 June 2024 Smirnov, previously an independent, joined United Russia party and was nominated for secretary of the party regional office.

== Candidates ==
In Kursk Oblast candidates for Governor can be nominated only by registered political parties. Candidate for Governor of Kursk Oblast should be a Russian citizen and at least 30 years old. Candidates for Governor should not have a foreign citizenship or residence permit. Each candidate in order to be registered is required to collect at least 6% of signatures of members and heads of municipalities. Also gubernatorial candidates present 3 candidacies to the Federation Council and election winner later appoints one of the presented candidates.

=== Declared ===
Candidate name, political party		Occupation	Status	Ref.
Gennady Bayev; SR–ZP		Member of Kursk Oblast Duma (2021–present)	Registered	
Aleksey Bobovnikov; Communist Party		Member of Kursk Oblast Duma (2015–2016, 2021–present)	Registered	
Aleksey Smirnov; United Russia	Aleksey Smirnov	Acting Governor of Kursk Oblast (2024–present); Former First Deputy Governor of Kursk Oblast – Chairman of the Government of Kursk Oblast (2021–2024)	Registered	
Aleksey Tomanov; Liberal Democratic Party		Member of Kursk Oblast Duma (2021–present); Aide to State Duma member Boris Chernyshov	Registered	

=== Eliminated at convention ===
- Mikhail Lukashov (United Russia), Member of Kursk City Assembly (2022–present)
- Nadezhda Ponomareva (United Russia), Member of Kursk City Assembly (2021–present), former Member of Kursk Oblast Duma (2016–2021)

=== Candidates for Federation Council ===
Incumbent Senator Grigory Rapota (Independent) was not renominated.

Gubernatorial candidate, political party	Candidates for Federation Council	Status
Gennady Bayev; SR–ZP	* Anton Glushkov, Member of Kursk Oblast Duma (2021–present), businessman * Aleksey Khodyrevsky, homeowners association chairman * Artyom Vyskrebentsev, Member of Kursk City Assembly (2017–present)	Registered
Aleksey Bobovnikov; Communist Party	* Aleksandr Anpilov, Member of Kursk Oblast Duma (1998–2000, 2001–present), former Chairman of the Oblast Duma (2001–2006) * Svetlana Kanunnikova, Member of Kursk City Assembly (2014–2016, 2017–present), former Member of Kursk Oblast Duma (2016–2017) * Aleksandr Ponarin, Member of Kursk City Assembly (2022–present)	Registered
Aleksey Smirnov; United Russia	* Viktor Karamyshev, Deputy Governor of Kursk Oblast (2021–present), former Member of State Duma (2016–2019) * Yekaterina Kharchenko, Member of State Duma (2021–present) * Aleksey Kondratyev, former Senator from Tambov Oblast (2015–2020), veteran of the Russian invasion of Ukraine	Registered
Aleksey Tomanov; Liberal Democratic Party	* Vadim Chelpanov, psychologist * Galina Perelygina, pensioner * Konstantin Timofeyev, Member of Kursk City Assembly (2022–present)	Registered

== Results ==
Summary of the 6–8 September 2024 Kursk Oblast gubernatorial election results
Candidate	Party	Votes	%
Aleksey Smirnov (incumbent)	United Russia	351,040	65.28
Aleksey Bobovnikov	Communist Party	72,772	13.53
Aleksey Tomanov	Liberal Democratic Party	63,527	11.81
Gennady Bayev	A Just Russia – For Truth	36,134	6.72
Valid votes		523,473	97.35
Blank ballots		14,263	2.65
Total		537,736	100.00
Turnout		537,736	61.51
Registered voters		874,183	100.00

Governor Smirnov appointed former Senator from Tambov Oblast Aleksey Kondratyev (United Russia) to the Federation Council, replacing incumbent Senator Grigory Rapota (Independent).

== See also ==
- 2024 Russian regional elections
