= Fyodor Sergeyev =

Russian revolutionary and politician (1883–1921)

- Фёдор Сергеев
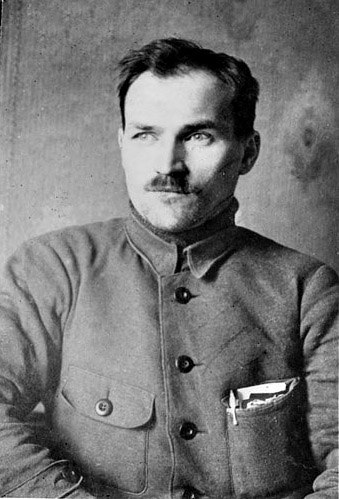

Chairman of CVRK in the Ukrainian SSR
- In office September 18, 1918 – March 10, 1919
- Preceded by: Andrei Bubnov
- Succeeded by: Grigoriy Petrovskiy as head of CIKUk

Chairman of the Provisional Workers-Peasants Government of Ukraine
- In office January 16, 1919 – January 28, 1919
- Preceded by: Yuri Pyatakov
- Succeeded by: Government dissolved, replaced by Council of People's Commissars

Chairman of Donetsk-Krivoy Rog Soviet Republic
- In office February 14, 1918 – February 17, 1919

Chairman of the Kharkov Military Revolutionary Committee
- In office September 24, 1917 – February 17, 1919

Personal details
- Born: Fyodor Andreyevich Sergeyev; March 19, 1883 Glebovo, Fatezhsky Uyezd, Kursk Governorate, Russian Empire
- Died: July 24, 1921 (aged 38) Tula, Russian SFSR
- Resting place: Kremlin Wall Necropolis, Moscow
- Party: RSDLP (1902–1903); RSDLP (Bolsheviks) (1903–1918); Russian Communist Party (1918–1921)
- Spouse: Yelizaveta Lvovna Repelskaya
- Children: Artyom Sergeyev (later adopted by Stalin)
- Education: Imperial Moscow Technical University
- Occupation: Revolutionary, politician, communist agitator

Fyodor Andreyevich Sergeyev (Russian: Фёдор Андреевич Сергеeв; Ukrainian: Федір Андрійович Сергєєв, romanized: Fedir Andriiovych Serhieiev; March 19, 1883 — July 24, 1921), better known as Comrade Artyom (Russian: товарищ Артём), was a Russian Bolshevik revolutionary, Soviet politician, agitator, and journalist. He was a close friend of Sergei Kirov and Joseph Stalin. Sergeyev was an ideologist of the Donetsk–Krivoy Rog Soviet Republic.

== Early life ==
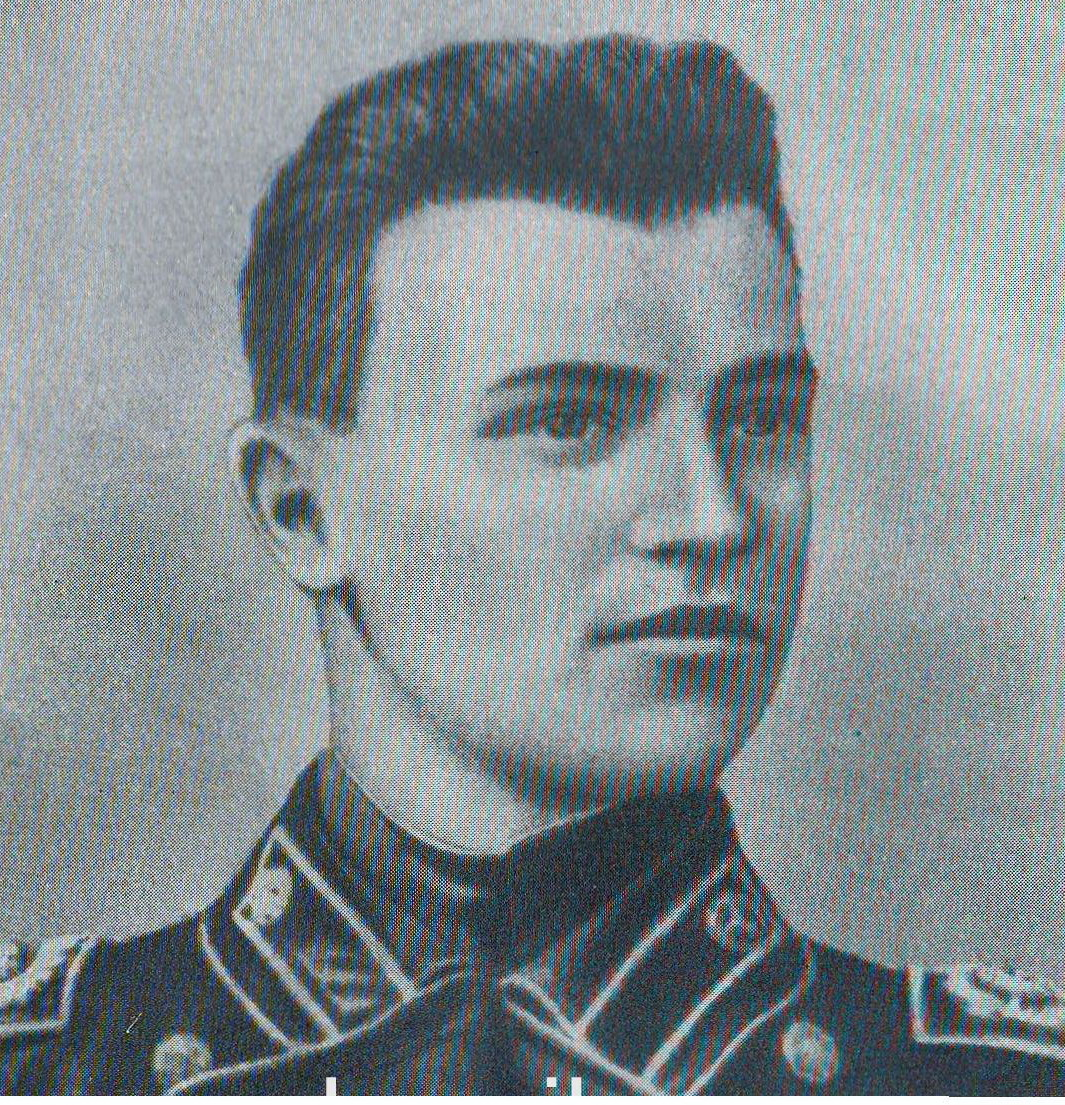
Young Artyom in student uniform

Fyodor Artyom was born in the village of Glebovo, Fatezhsky Uyezd, Kursk Governorate, Russian Empire, near the city of Fatezh to a family of peasants. His father Andrey Arefyevich Sergeyev was a contractor to a construction porter, who in 1888 moved the family to Yekaterinoslav. In 1901, Fyodor finished studies at the Yekaterinoslav realschule. He went on to attend the Imperial Moscow Technical College. Sergeyev joined the Russian Social Democratic Labour Party and became interested in revolutionary thinking, adopting the nickname 'Artyom'.

== Party career ==
In 1901, Artyom was arrested for taking part in a student demonstration, and spent four months in Voronezh prison. After his release, he emigrated to Paris, where he studied at the 'Russian Higher Free School'. From 1902, he was a member of the Russian Social Democratic Labour Party, later remaining with the Bolshevik faction of the party. He returned to Russia in 1903 and was a prominent party agitator in Yekaterinoslav, where he moved from factory to factory, finding work as a stoker. In 1905, he moved to Kharkov, where he headed the Bolshevik organisation and in December, he led an armed rebellion by factory workers. This made him well known to the police, but he was able to evade arrest until later in 1906, when he was interned in Kharkov prison, but escaped. He was assigned by the Bolsheviks to run the organisation in Perm, where he was arrested again. After nearly three years in prison, he was deported to Siberia.

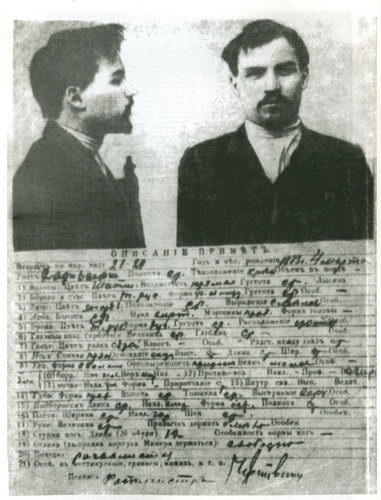
Police photo of Sergeyev after arrest

In 1910, he escaped through Korea and Japan to Brisbane, Australia, where he organized the Union of Russian emigrants. In 1912, Sergeyev became chief-editor of "Echo of Australia" and was better known as "Big Tom". He joined the Australian Socialist Party and was involved in trade-unionist opposition to the First World War. In 1917, after the February Revolution, he returned to Russia, becoming a leader of the Bolshevik faction in the Kharkov council.

In October 1917, Artyom was the organizer of a Bolshevik military coup-d'etat in Kharkov and the whole Donets basin region. At the 1st congress of Soviets in Ukraine, he was elected to the Central Executive Committee of Ukraine and later appointed the Ukrainian Narkom of Trade and Industry. In 1918, while Ukraine was under German occupation, Artyom was a chairman of the Sovnarkom of the separatist Donetsk-Krivoy Rog Soviet Republic and Narkom of Public Economy. His actions secured the nationalization of industrial centers concentrated in the eastern Ukraine. Sergeyev became one of the organizers of Ukrainian Central Military-Revolutionary Committee in opposition to the Central Powers and Kaledin's Cossacks. On 27 March, he organized the Donetsk Army by the order of Vladimir Antonov-Ovseyenko; however, by the end of April 1918 that army was integrated into the 5th Army of Red Army headed by Kliment Voroshilov.

== Political career ==
In 1919, when Ukraine was occupied by the Bolsheviks again, Artyom was appointed People's Commissar for Agitation and Propaganda by Vladimir Lenin, but later in the year he was transferred to Russian Bashkiria (modern name Bashkortostan), as Chairman of the Society for Aid to Bashkiria. He was therefore one of the first Bolsheviks to hold power in a predominantly Muslim part of the former Russian Empire.

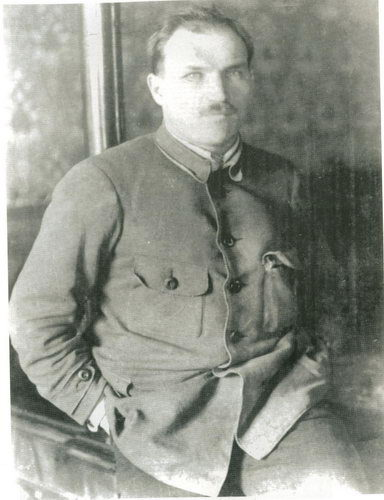
Sergeyev during his leadership in Donetsk

In April 1920, he was again elected chairman of the Donetsk Provincial Executive Committee. From March 1919 to March 1920, he was a candidate member of the Central Committee of the Russian Communist Party (b). At the 9th and 10th congresses of the RCP (b), he was elected a member of the Central Committee. From November to December 1920, Artyom was executive secretary of the Moscow Committee of the RCP (b), then chairman of the Central Committee of the All-Russian Union of Miners and simultaneously a member of the All-Russian Central Executive Committee.

== Death ==
Fyodor Sergeyev died in 1921 during the test of the Aerowagon. He was buried in Mass Grave No. 12 of the Kremlin Wall Necropolis in Red Square, Moscow.

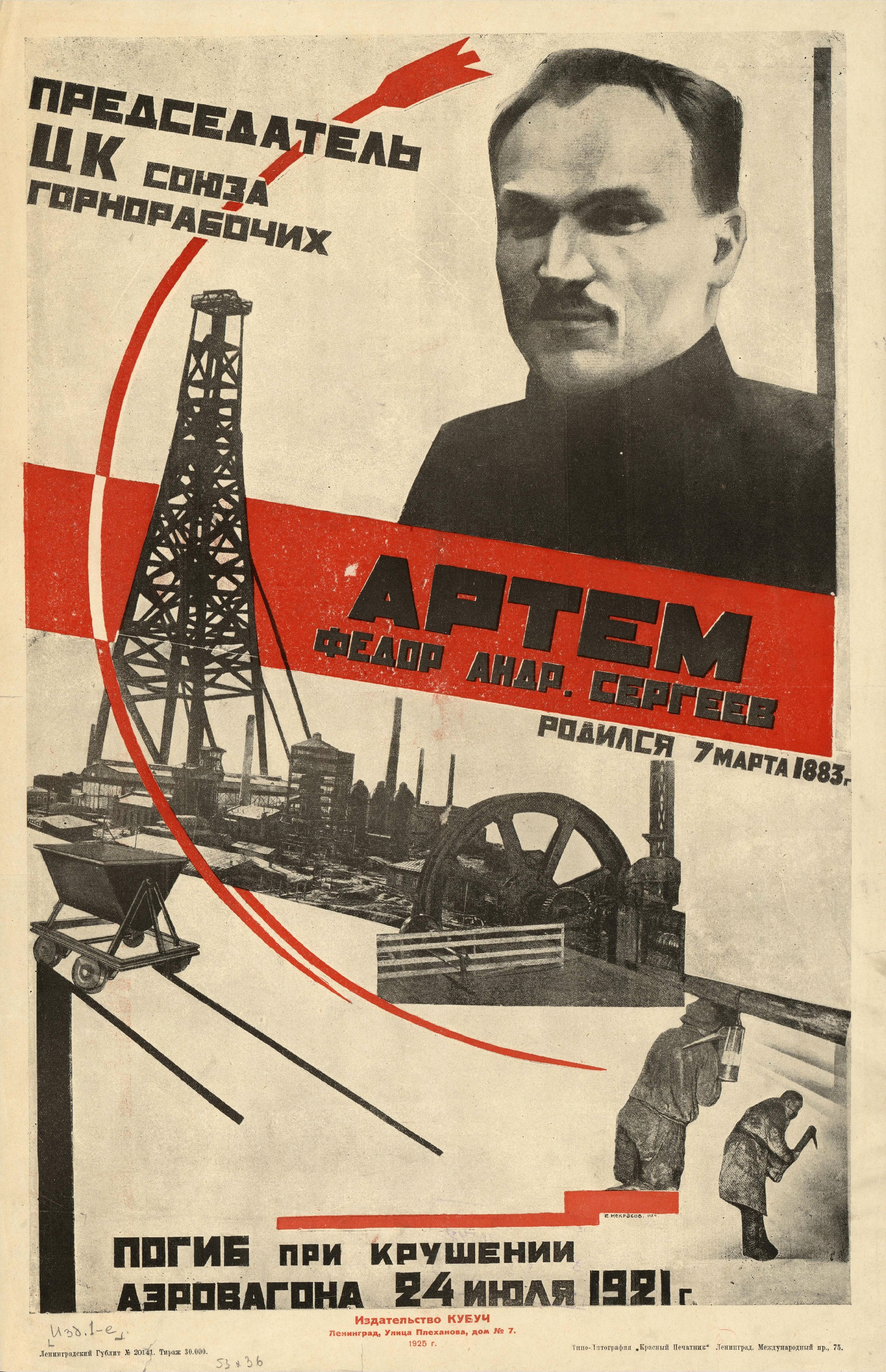
Commemorative poster for Artyom Sergeyev by the Union of Miners, 1925

The city of Bakhmut (now in Ukraine), former center of Donetsk-Krivoy Rog Soviet Republic, was renamed after Artyom as Artemovsk (Artemivsk) in 1924. His infant son Artyom Fyodorovich was adopted by Joseph Stalin.

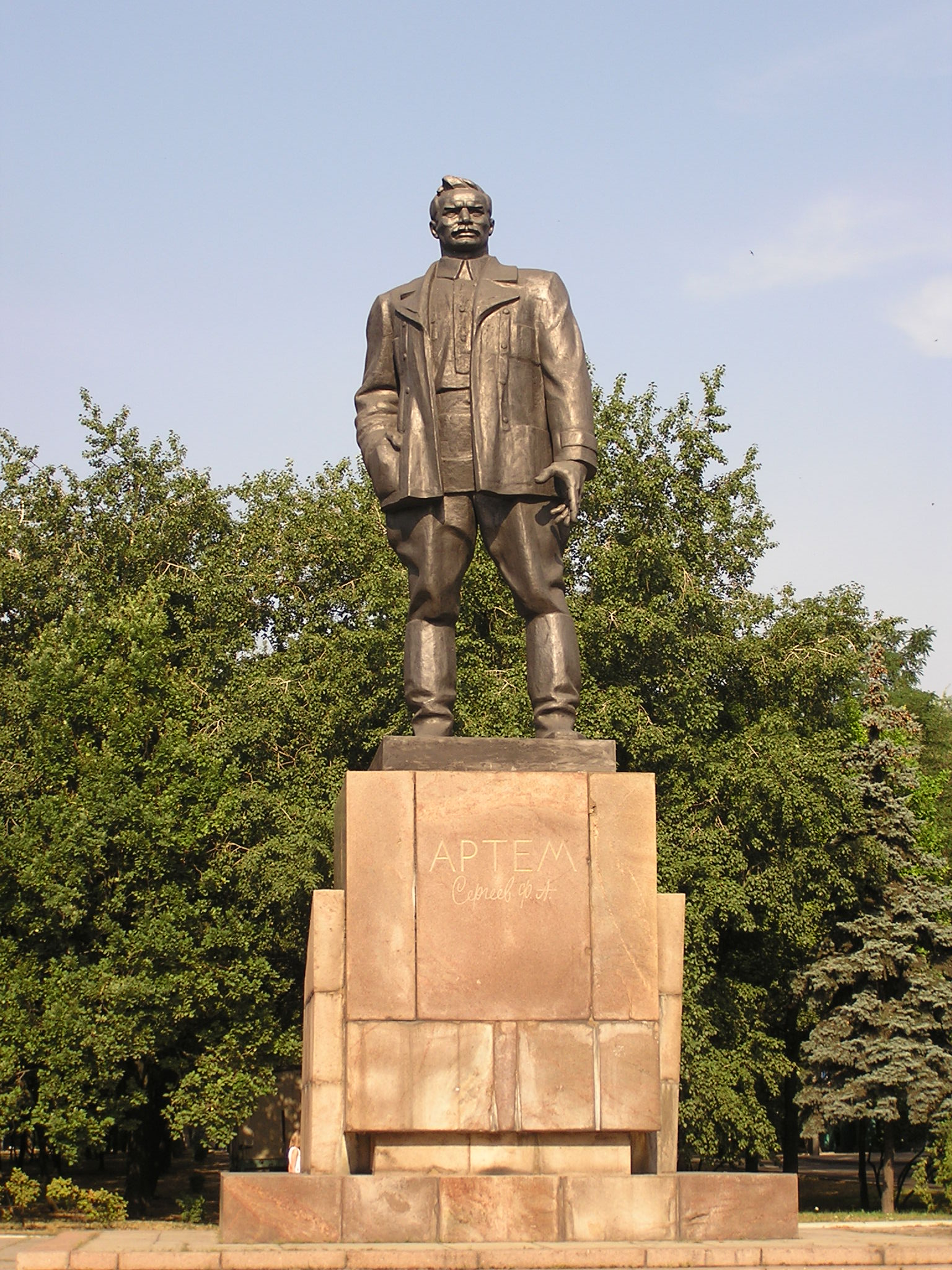
Monument to Artyom in Donetsk

On 15 May 2015, the then President of Ukraine Petro Poroshenko signed a bill into law that started a six-month period for the removal of communist monuments and the mandatory renaming of settlements with a name related to the Soviet Union. In February 2016, the city of Artemivsk returned to its original name: Bakhmut.

Artemivsk of Luhansk region is also named after Artyom. From 2014 until its annexation by Russia in 2022, the city was occupied by pro-Russian forces of the Luhansk People's Republic. On 12 May 2016, Ukraine's national parliament, the Verkhovna Rada, decided to restore the name of Kypuche as part of the country's decommunization process. However, the local authorities did not recognize the name change and Russia has continued not to after its annexation in September 2022.

== In fiction ==
In Thomas Keneally's novel The People's Train, the lead character, Artem — aka "Tom" — Samsurov, is loosely based on the life of Sergeyev.

== See also ==
- Outline of the Russian Revolution and Civil War
- Bibliography of the Russian Revolution and Civil War
- Bibliography of Stalinism and the Soviet Union
- Index of Old Bolsheviks
- Index of articles related to the Russian Revolution and Civil War
- List of mayors of Kharkiv
