= Kursk Oblast =

First-level administrative division of Russia

Kursk Oblast Курская область (Russian)
- Oblast
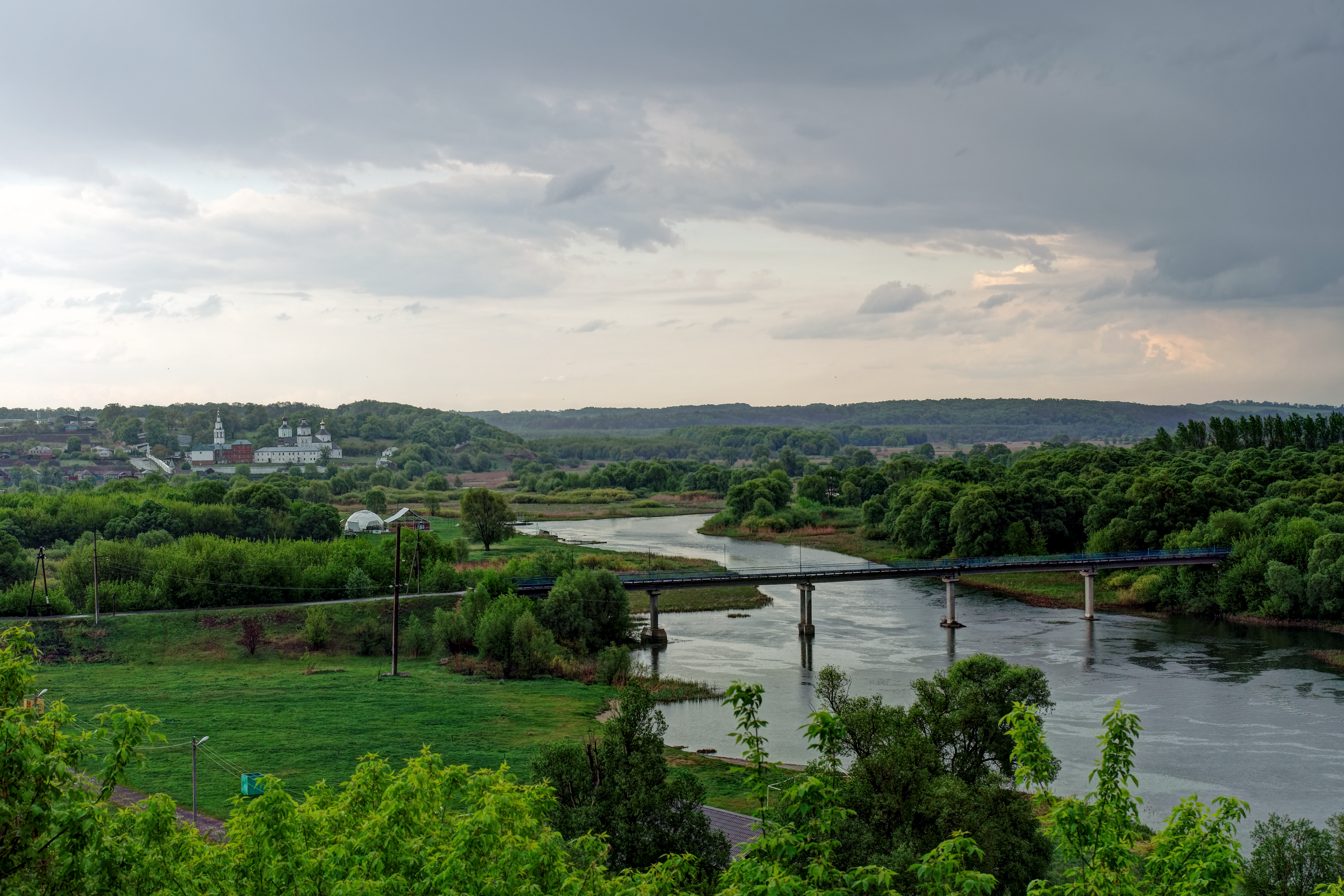
- City of Rylsk

- Flag Coat of arms

- Kursk Oblast in Russia, including disputed territory of Crimea
- Coordinates: 51°45′N 36°01′E
- Country: Russia
- Federal district: Central
- Economic region: Central Black Earth
- Established: June 13, 1934; 92 years ago
- Administrative center: Kursk

Government
  - Body: Oblast Duma
  - Governor: Alexander Khinshtein

Area
  - Total: 29,997 km^{2} (11,582 sq mi)
  - Rank: 65th

Population (2021 census)
  - Total: 1,082,458 ▼
  - Estimate (2018): 1,115,237
  - Rank: 46th
  - Density: 36.086/km^{2} (93.461/sq mi)
  - Urban: 68.4%
  - Rural: 31.6%

GDP (nominal, 2024)
  - Total: ₽832 billion (US$9.76 billion)
  - Per capita: ₽788,412 (US$9,251.38)
- Time zone: UTC+3 (MSK)
- ISO 3166 code: RU-KRS
- License plates: 46
- OKTMO ID: 38000000
- Official languages: Russian
- Website: kursk.ru (in Russian) курскаяобласть.рф (Defunct)

Kursk Oblast (Note: Russian: Курская область, romanized: Kurskaya oblastʹ, IPA: [ˈkurskəjə ˈobləsʲtʲ]) is a federal subject of Russia (an oblast). Its administrative center is the city of Kursk. As of the 2021 census, Kursk Oblast had a population of 1,082,458.

== History ==
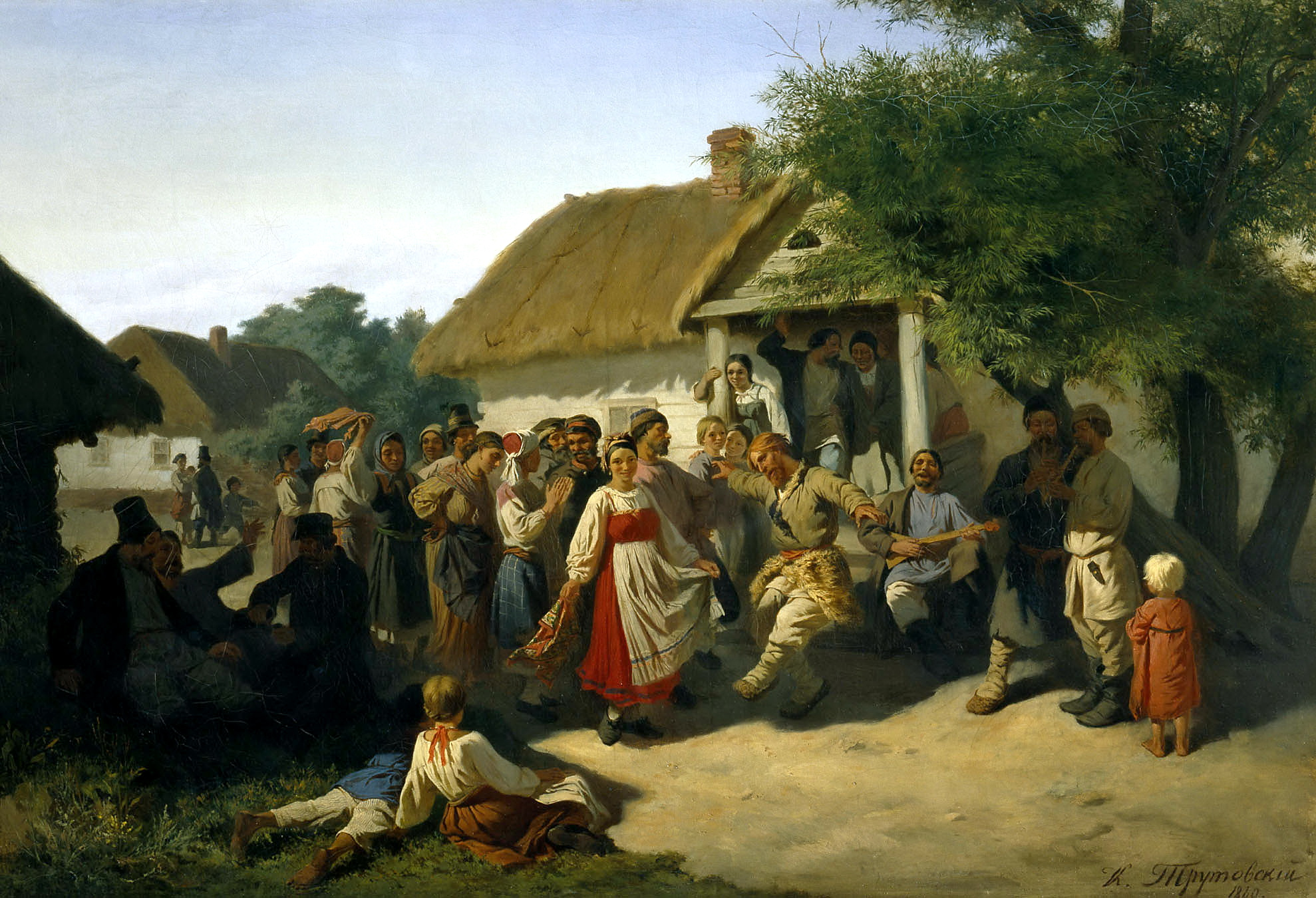
A Khorovod in Kursk, 1860, painting by Konstantin Trutovsky

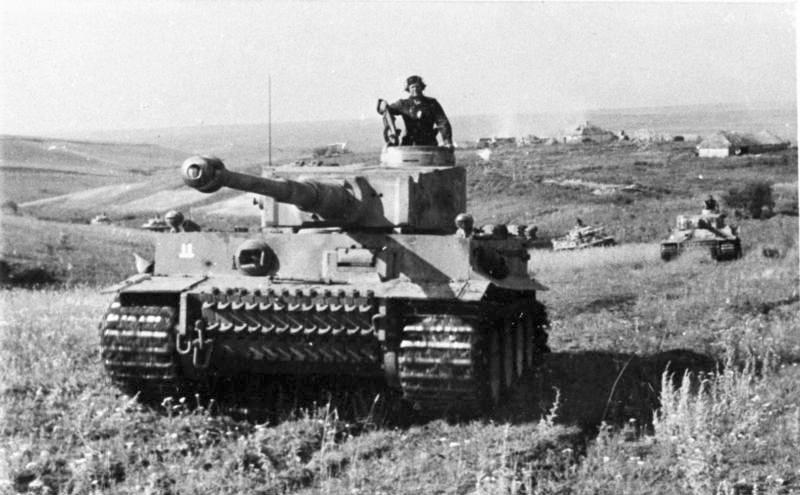
Waffen-SS Panzer Division Das Reich with a Tiger I tank, in June 1943 before the Battle of Kursk

The territory of Kursk Oblast has been populated since the end of the last ice age. Slavic tribes of the Severians inhabited the area. From 830 the current Kursk Oblast was part of the Rus' Khaganate and Kievan Rus' states. The oldest towns in the region are Kursk and Rylsk, first mentioned in 1032 and 1152, respectively, both capitals of small medieval eponymous duchies. In the 13th century, the region was conquered by the Mongol Empire.

In the 15th century it was part of the Grand Duchy of Lithuania under the Jagiellonian dynasty. It was lost in the 16th-century Muscovite–Lithuanian Wars to the Grand Duchy of Moscow. A real growth of the area around Kursk began soon after that, with a large migration from Central Russia after the Russian famine of 1601–1603. The region was affected by Crimean–Nogai slave raids in the 16th and 17th centuries. The current southwestern outskirts of the oblast with the town of Sudzha were part of Sloboda Ukraine and populated by Ukrainians since the mid-17th century. Between 1708 and 1719, Kursk was part of the newly created Kiev Governorate. From 1719 to 1727, it was a part of Belgorodsky Uyezd of Kiev Governorate. From 1727, Kursky Uyezd was part of Belgorod Governorate. On 23 May 1779, Kursk Governorate was established.

During World War I and the Russian Civil War, in 1918, it was the site of fights of anti-Bolshevik Ukrainians and Germans against Soviet Russia. In 1918, the western portion of the current Kursk Oblast with the towns of Rylsk and Sudzha was part of the Ukrainian State. Korenevo was the place of signing of a ceasefire between the Ukrainian State, Germany and Soviet Russia in May 1918. Kursk was the place of establishment of the Provisional Workers' and Peasants' Government of Ukraine, and Sudzha was its first seat in November-December 1918. Sudzha remained part of Soviet Ukraine until 1922.

The Kursk Governorate existed until 1928, when the territory of Kursk Governorate became a part of Central Black Earth Oblast. As Central Chernozem Oblast was very large its administration was very difficult, on 13 June 1934 it was divided into two oblasts: Kursk Oblast and Voronezh Oblast. In the period between 1934 and 1954, oblasts' borders were frequently adjusted. However, the area and borders of the oblast have remained stable from 1954.

During World War II, the territory of Kursk Oblast was occupied by German troops from the autumn of 1941 until the summer of 1943. The Battle of Kursk, which was one of the major battles of World War II, took place in the region between 5 July 1943 and 23 August 1943.

The 4th leader of the Soviet Union, Nikita Khrushchev, was born in Kalinovka, a village that is now part of the Kursk Oblast.

As of 2024, the Urengoy–Pomary–Uzhhorod pipeline in Sudzha was the last remaining point through which natural gas flowed from Russia to Europe via Ukraine.

In August 2024, Ukrainian forces crossed the border into Kursk Oblast during the Russo-Ukrainian War resulting in a small part of the oblast coming under Ukrainian occupation. In April 2025, the Chief of Russia's General Staff Valery Gerasimov reported that the Kursk Oblast had been liberated from Ukrainian troops. According to the Governor of the Kursk Oblast Alexander Khinshtein, 288 civilians had been killed during the Ukrainian incursion into the region.

== Geography ==
Location of Kursk Oblast

Kursk Oblast is bordered by Bryansk Oblast to the north-west (border length: 120 km (75 mi)), Oryol Oblast to the north (325 km (202 mi)), Lipetsk Oblast to the north-east (65 km (40 mi)), Voronezh Oblast to the east (145 km (90 mi)), Belgorod Oblast to the south (335 km (208 mi)), and Sumy Oblast of Ukraine to the west (245 km (152 mi)).

It occupies the southern slopes of the middle-Russian plateau. The surface is hilly and intersected by ravines. The central part of the oblast is more elevated than the Seym river valley in the west. The average elevation is 177–225 m (581–738 ft) and the Timsko-Shchigrinsky ridge contains the highest point at 288 m (945 ft) above sea level. The low relief, gentle slopes, and mild winters make the area suitable for farming, and much of the forest has been cleared. Chernozem soils cover around 70% of the oblast, and podsol soils 26%; chernozem is among the best soils for agriculture, and podsol among the worst.

Kursk Oblast contributes to two major drainage areas: the Dnieper River and the Don River (78% and 22% respectively). There are 902 rivers and streams in the oblast, with a total length of approximately 8,000 km (5,000 mi). Major rivers include the Seym and the Psyol. The inland waters of Kursk oblast consist of 145 artificial lakes and about 550 small ponds.

=== Natural resources ===
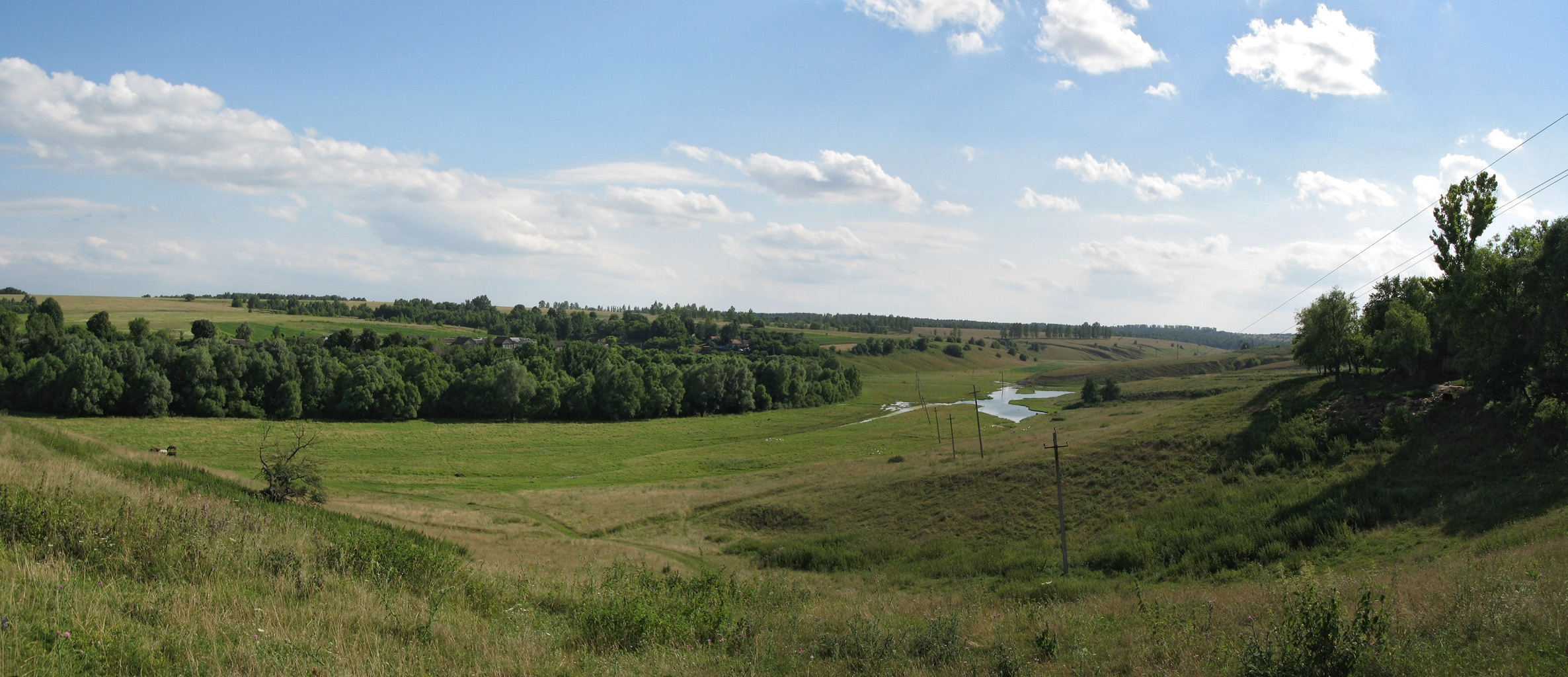
Kursk Oblast landscape

Kursk Oblast is one of Russia's major producers of iron ore. The area of the Kursk Magnetic Anomaly has one of the richest iron-ore deposits in the world. Rare earths and base metals also occur in commercial quantities in several locations. Refractory loam, mineral sands, and chalk are quarried and processed in the region. The oblast's reserves of artesian-well water are proving useful for medical purposes.

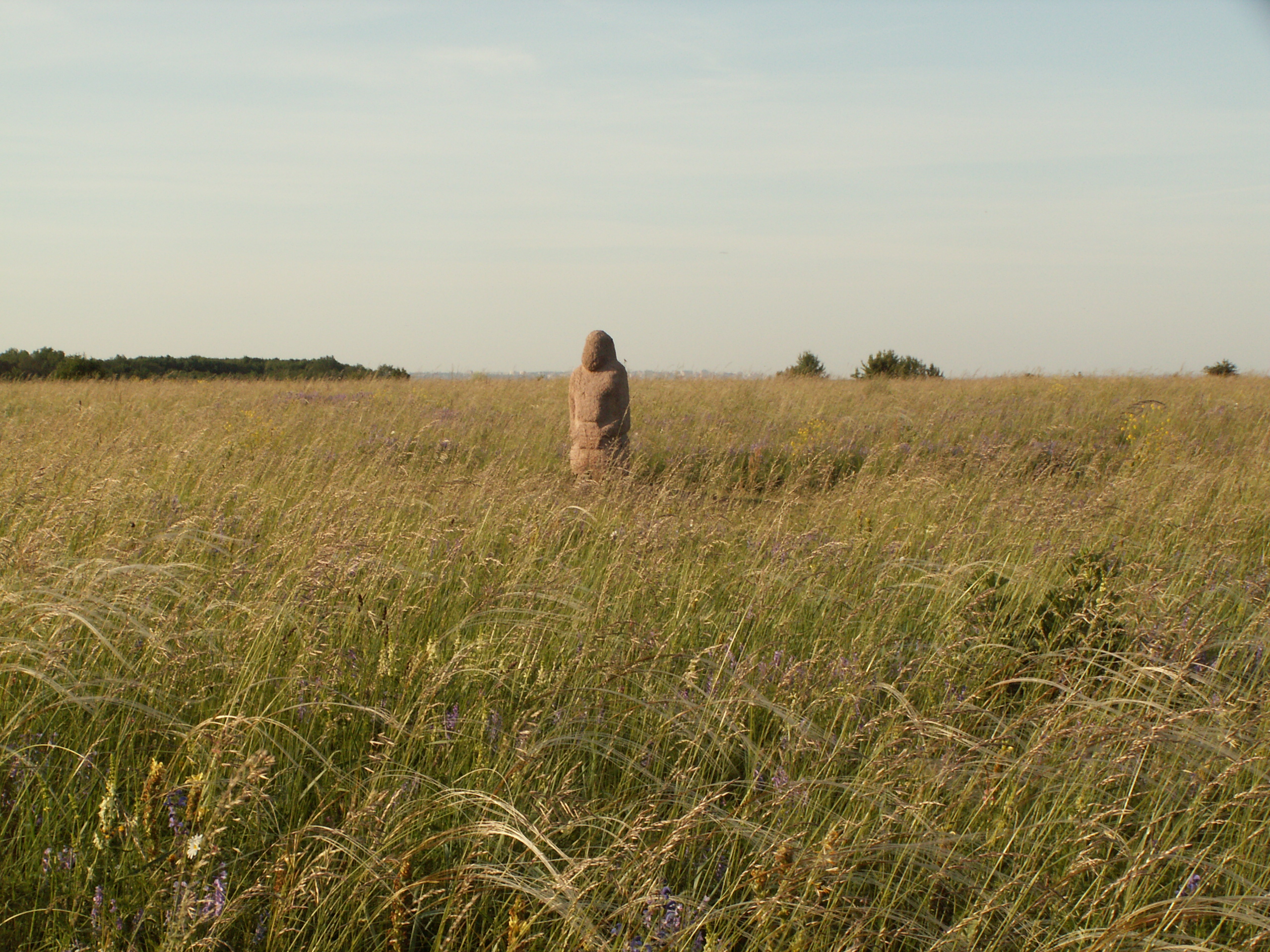
A Cuman statue in the East European forest steppe in the oblast

=== Climate ===
The oblast's location at the center of the European part of Russia gives the region a medium continental climate: warm summers and relatively mild winters. In July the average daytime high temperature is +19.3 °C (66.7 °F). In January the average high is −8.6 °C (16.5 °F). The average number of frost-free days ranges from 150 in the north to 160 in the south. The growing season in Kursk Oblast varies, from 180 days in the north to 195 days in the southwest. The average annual precipitation for the oblast is 584 mm (23.0 in), but it ranges from 634 mm (25.0 in) in the northwest to about 500 mm (20 in) or less in the southeastern corner. Rainfall peaks during June and July. The snow depth in Kursk Oblast differs considerably, from 300–400 mm (12–16 in) in the north of the oblast, to 150–250 mm (5.9–9.8 in) in the south. Annual sunshine is 1775 hours.

=== Flora and fauna ===
Kursk Oblast forms a part of the Eastern European forest-steppe. One-quarter of Kursk oblast was once heavily wooded. Hardwood timbers included oak, ash, and elm. Now forests cover only 10% of the oblast. Animals native to the area are numerous. Pike, bleak, and perch abound in local rivers. Otter and badger, as well as wild boar, red deer, and roe deer remain numerous in many parts of the area.

== Demographics ==
Historical population
Year	Pop.	±%
1897	2,371,012	—
1926	2,906,360	+22.6%
1959	1,483,305	−49.0%
1970	1,473,864	−0.6%
1979	1,398,889	−5.1%
1989	1,339,414	−4.3%
2002	1,235,091	−7.8%
2010	1,127,081	−8.7%
2021	1,082,458	−4.0%
2025	1,050,134	−3.0%
Source: Census data, estimate

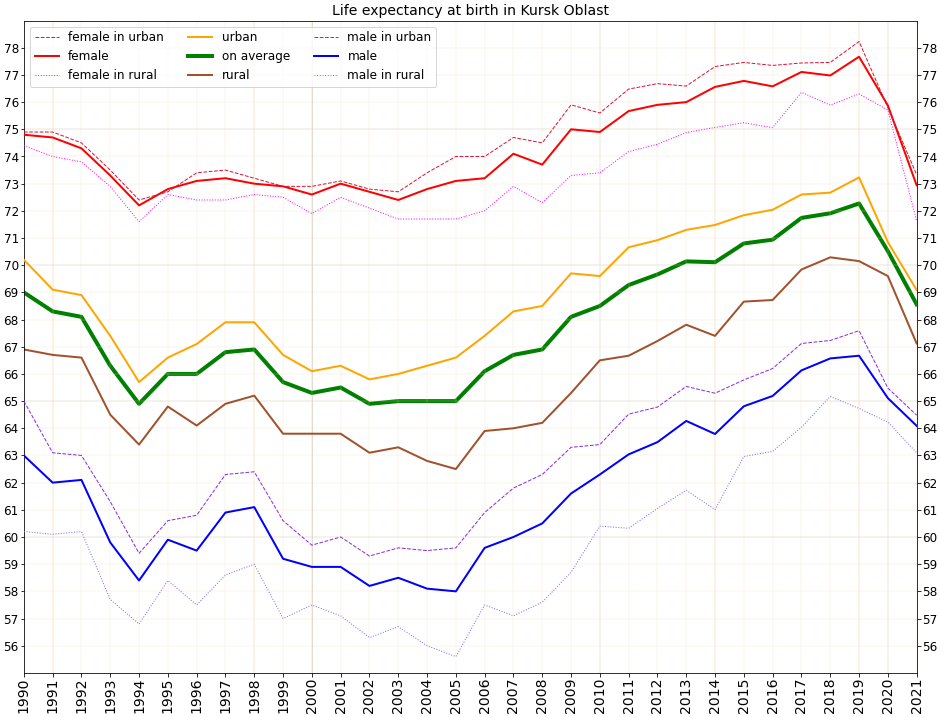
Life expectancy at birth in Kursk Oblast

Population: 1,082,458 (2021 census); 1,127,081 (2010 census); 1,235,091 (2002 census); 1,339,414 (1989 Soviet census).

Vital statistics for 2024:

- Births: 7,252 (6.9 per 1,000)
- Deaths: 15,848 (15.0 per 1,000)

Total fertility rate (2024):
1.24 children per woman

Life expectancy (2021):
Total — 68.56 years (male — 64.09, female — 72.94)

Ethnic composition (2021):

- Russians – 95.9%
- Ukrainians – 0.6%
- Armenians – 0.6%
- Others – 2.7%
- 148,354 people were registered from administrative databases, and could not declare an ethnicity. It is estimated that the proportion of ethnicities in this group is the same as that of the declared group.

According to the 1897 census, there were 77.3% Russians and 22.3% Ukrainians in the Kursk Governorate. The 1932 forced end to Ukrainization in southern Russia (Soviet Republic) led to a massive decline of reported Ukrainians in these regions in the 1937 Soviet Census compared to the 1926 First All-Union Census of the Soviet Union.

The annual growth rate of the oblast's population is negative; death rate exceeds overall birth rates and immigration.

Religion

Religion in Kursk Oblast as of 2012 (Sreda Arena Atlas)
Russian Orthodoxy	68.7%
Old Believers	0.5%
Other Christians	0.9%
Spiritual but not religious	24.2%
Atheism and irreligion	4.2%
Other and undeclared	1.5%

According to a 2012 survey 68.7% of the population of Kursk Oblast adheres to the Russian Orthodox Church. In addition, 24% of the population declares to be "spiritual but not religious", 4% is atheist, and 3.3% follows other religions or did not give an answer to the question.

=== Education ===
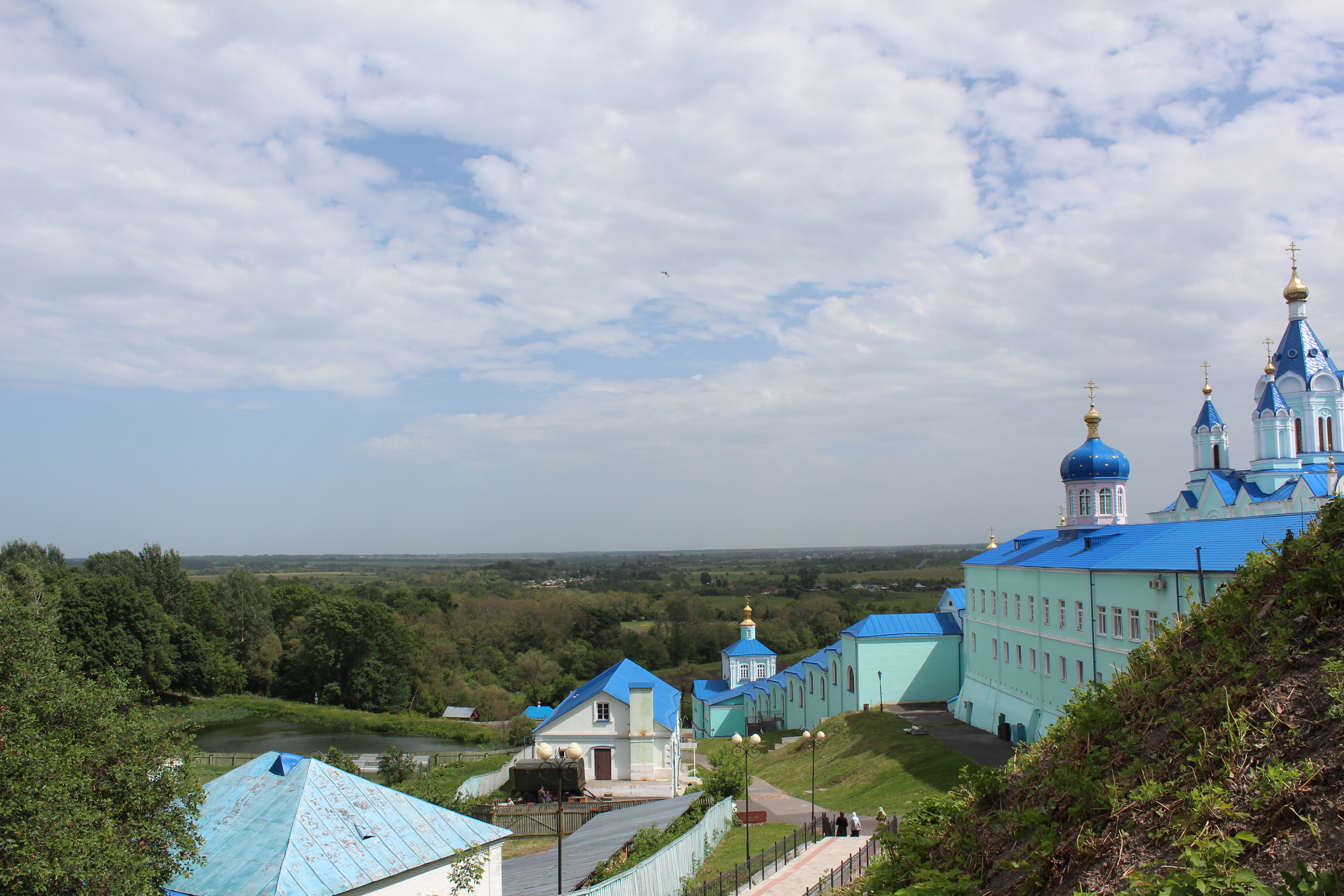
An Orthodox monastery where Our Lady of Kursk used to be located

The largest universities of Kursk Oblast are Kursk State University, Kursk State Technical University, Kursk State Medical University and Kursk State Agricultural Academy, all of which are located in the city of Kursk. There are also 19 other higher education facilities in Kursk Oblast.

== Politics ==
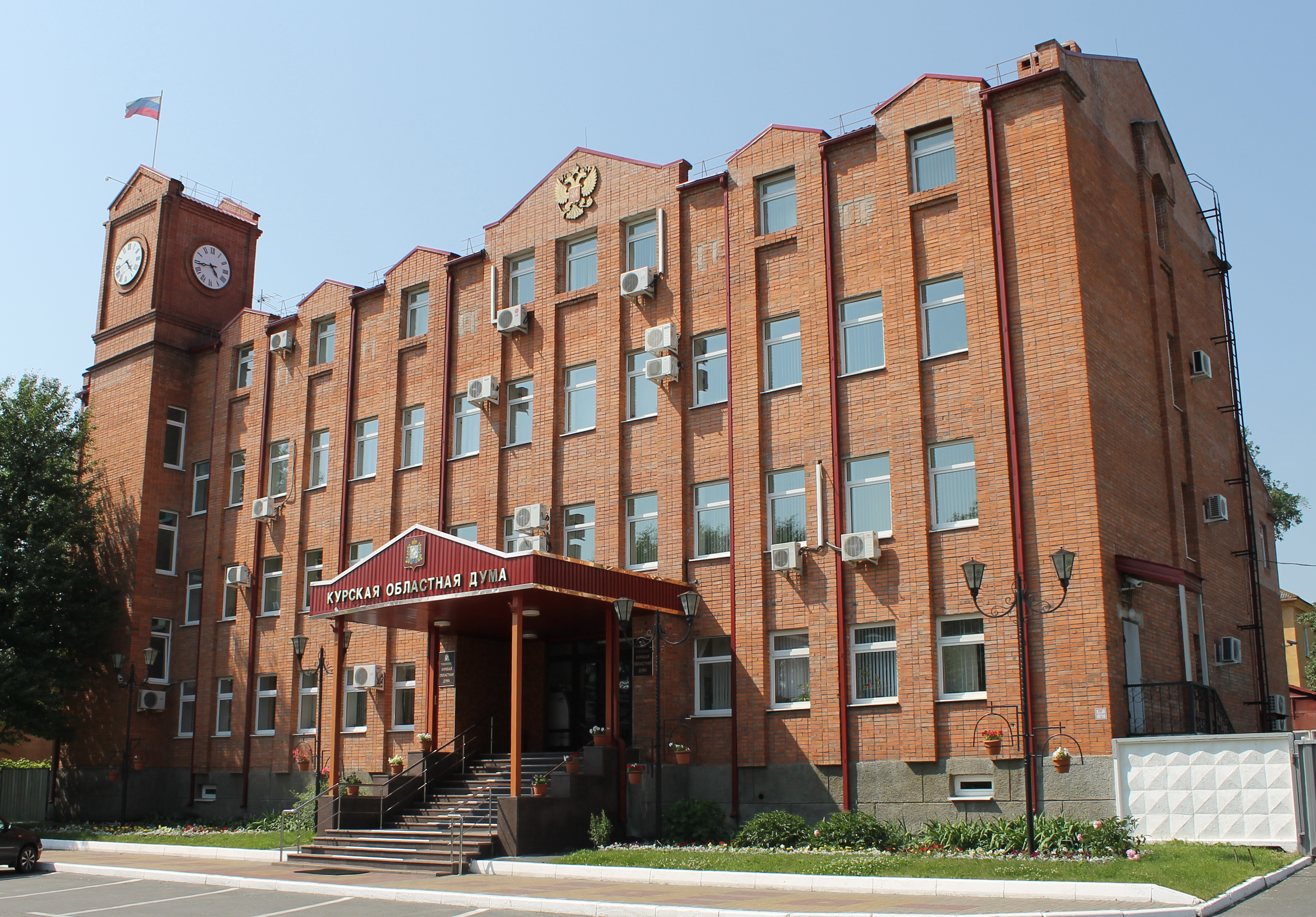
Kursk Oblast Duma seat, June 2012

During the Soviet period, the high authority in the oblast was shared between three persons: The first secretary of the Kursk CPSU Committee (who in reality had the biggest authority), the chairman of the oblast Soviet (legislative power), and the Chairman of the oblast Executive Committee (executive power). In 1991, CPSU lost power, and the head of the Oblast administration, and eventually the governor was appointed/elected alongside elected regional parliament.

The Charter of Kursk Oblast is the fundamental law of the region. The Kursk Oblast Duma is the province's standing legislative (representative) body. The Legislative Assembly exercises its authority by passing laws, resolutions, and other legal acts and by supervising the implementation and observance of the laws and other legal acts passed by it. The highest executive body is the Oblast Government, which includes territorial executive bodies such as district administrations, committees, and commissions that facilitate development and run the day to day matters of the province. The Oblast administration supports the activities of the Governor who is the highest official and acts as guarantor of the observance of the oblast Charter in accordance with the Constitution of Russia.

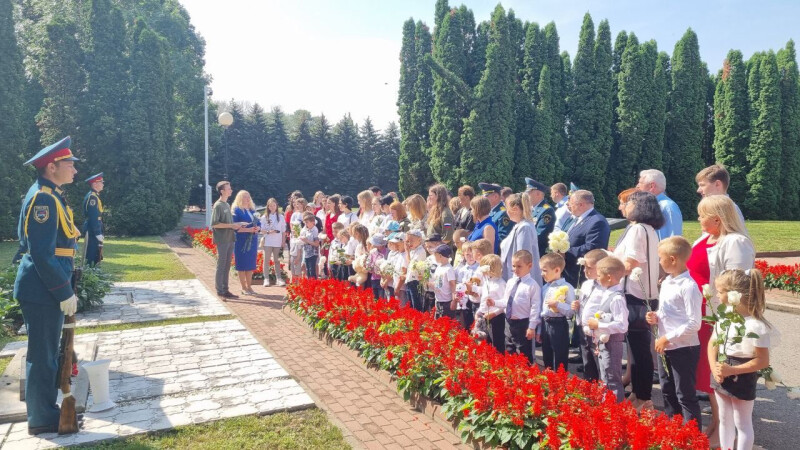
Russian children lay flowers at a memorial to children allegedly killed by Ukrainian forces in Donbas, a state-sponsored event in Kursk in July 2023

The pro-government United Russia Party and the Communist Party of the Russian Federation are Kursk Oblast's major political parties. Traditionally, the Communist Party is the strongest in the Oblast's rural area.

== Economy ==
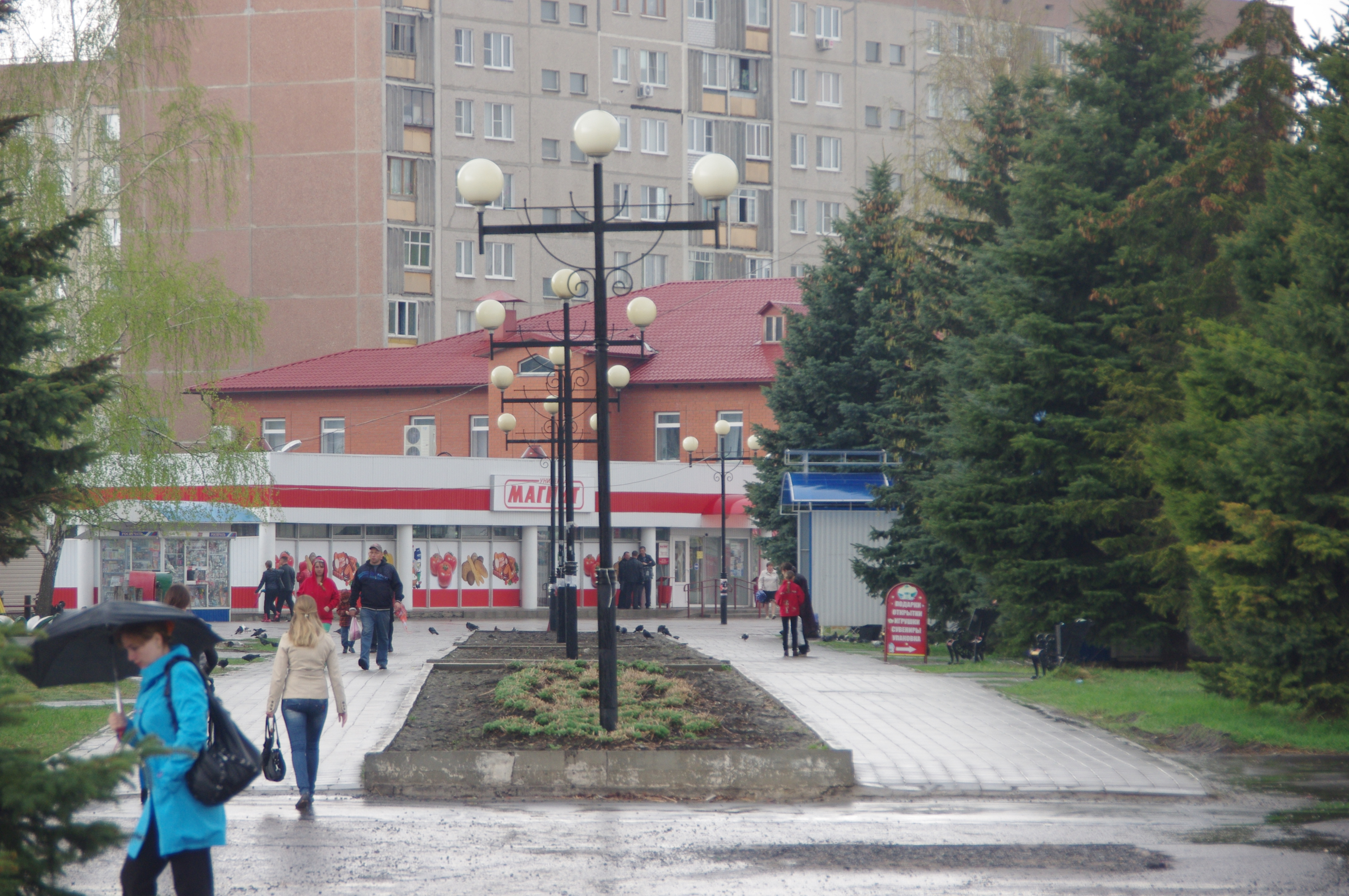
Shops in Kurchatov in 2013

=== Industry ===
The oblast's industrial production dropped rapidly during the 1990s, as an industrial crisis was stimulated by the nationwide economic crisis which followed the collapse of the Soviet Union. However, by the end of the decade output was increasing. Moreover, the manufacturing sector, despite a sagging economy in the late 20th century, continues to account for about 40% of the oblast's GDP. The engineering, electric-power, metal-working, chemicals, and food processing are the dominant industries.

The Mikhailovsky Mining Plant is one of the largest iron ore mining and processing facilities in Russia.

The Kursk Nuclear Power Plant is one of the three biggest nuclear power plants in Russia and one of the four biggest electricity producers in the country.

=== Agriculture ===
Most of the main farming areas are used for natural pastures or cultivation, which involves mainly wheat, sugar beet, and fodder crops. The main categories of productive holdings are wheat farms, dairy farms, poultry farms, and beef cattle. Agricultural lands cover 23,000 km^{2} (8,900 sq mi), or 77% of the oblast's territory.

Kursk lies at the heart of Russia's Central Black Earth Region, so-named for its rich black soils.

=== Transportation ===
The transportation industry of Kursk Oblast, with easy access to national and international markets, is the basis for the oblast's development. The most important modes of transport throughout the oblast are railway and road. Region roads serve towns and rural settlements through a 5,600 km (3,500 mi) road network. An airport in the oblast was opened to international flights in July 1997.

The oblast's railroads are one of the most important parts of the transportation system. They are part of the Moscow and South Eastern Railway systems. Two major rail links pass through the oblast: Moscow–Kharkiv and Kyiv–Voronezh. The total length of the railway network is 1,100 km (680 mi). The operational length of the railways is 1,561.2 km (970.1 mi), of which 500 km (310 mi) are access roads. The length of the electrified lines is 242 km (150 mi). The density of the railroads in Kursk Oblast is one of the highest in Russia. The largest railway junctions are Kursk, Lgov, and Kastornoye. There are sixty-five railway stations in the oblast.

== Tourism ==
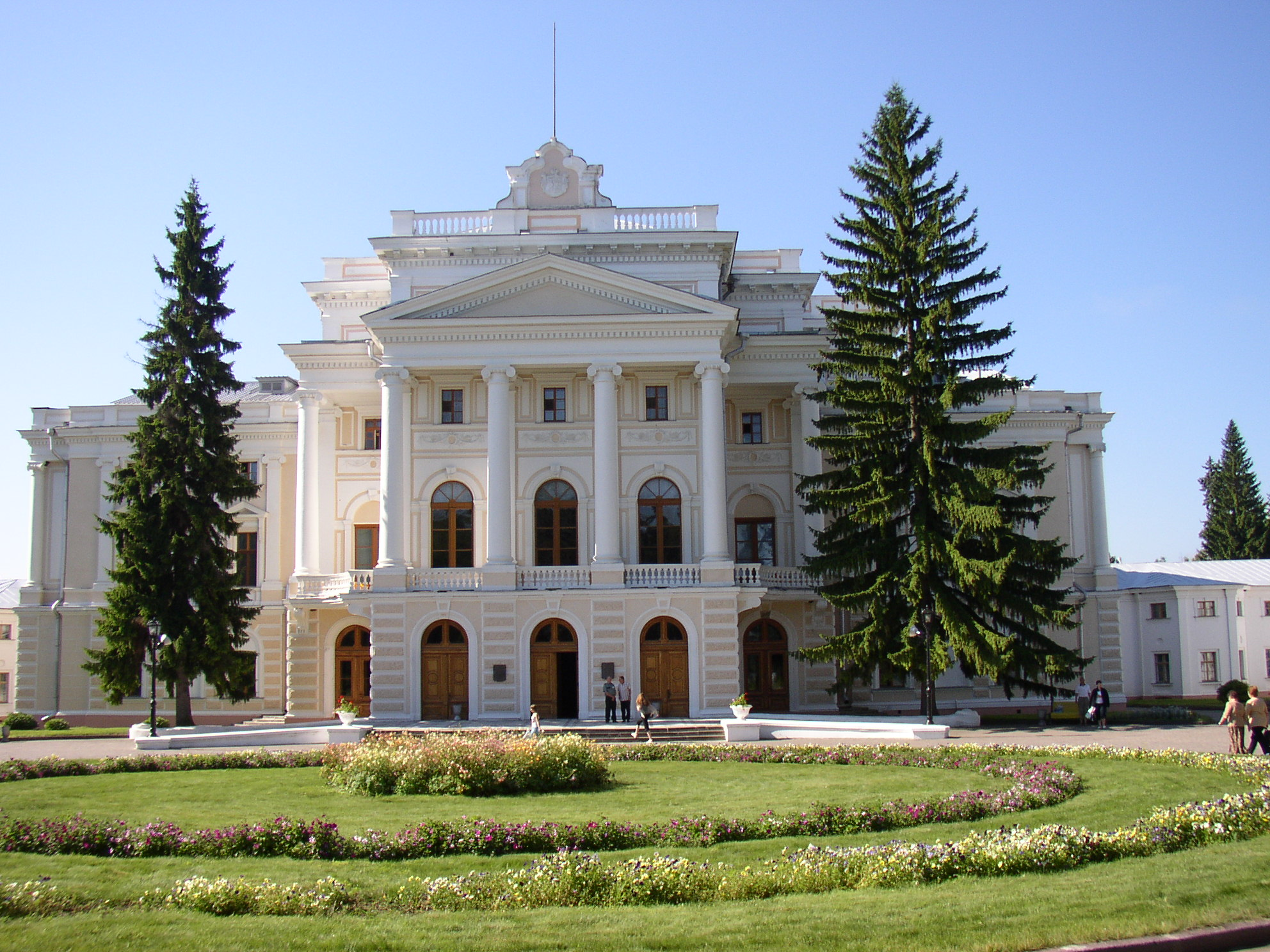
The Maryino Estate was built by the princely Baryatinsky family in the 19th century

Kursk Oblast's most prominent natural attraction is the Central Black Earth Nature Reserve, which is well-suited for hiking and other outdoor activities. The Oblast's forests and other undeveloped areas are ideal for hunting, fishing, and camping. Traditional art and architecture are preserved in the town-museum of Rylsk and other historical towns of Kursk Oblast.

== See also ==
- List of Chairmen of the Kursk Oblast Duma
