= Konstantin Trutovsky =

Russian genre painter and illustrator (1826–1893)

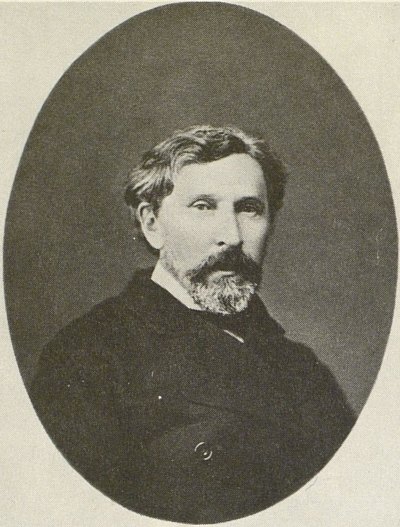
- Born: 9 February 1826; Kursk, Oboyansky Uyezd, Kursk Governorate, Russian Empire (now Russian Federation)
- Died: 29 March 1893 (aged 67); Yakovlevka, Oboyansky Uyezd, Kursk Governorate, Russian Empire (now Russian Federation)
- Education: Nikolaevsky Engineering Academy
- Movement: Genre painting

Konstantin Aleksandrovich Trutovsky (Russian: Костантин Александрович Трутовский; 9 February 1826 – 29 March 1893) was a Russian painter, illustrator, and academic. Among his best-known works are illustrations for the writings of Nikolai Gogol, Mikhail Lermontov, and Ivan Krylov as well as his paintings depicting rural life in Malorossiya. Trutovsky also held positions with the Imperial Academy of Arts in St. Petersburg and the Société Royale Belge des Aquarellistes.

== Biography ==
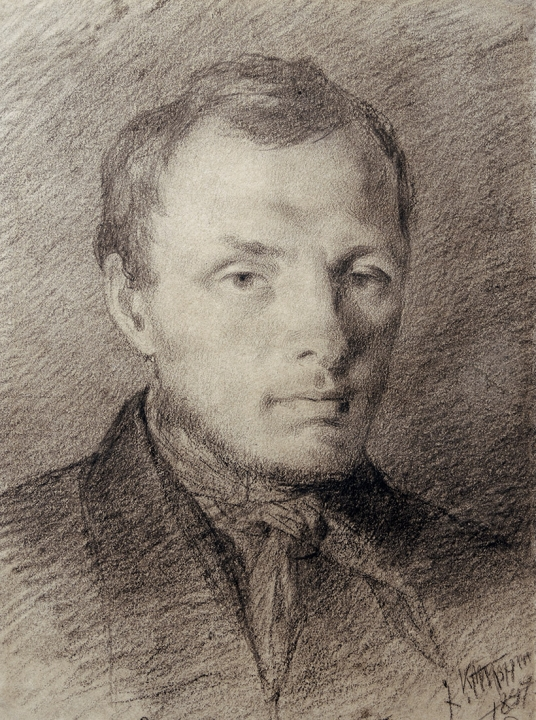
Fyodor Dostoyevsky (1847)

He was born in Kursk, Russian Empire in a Russian nobility family. His primary education was in Kharkiv, Russian Empire then, after his father's death, he was taken to Saint Petersburg in 1839, where he was enrolled at the Nikolaevsky Engineering Academy and his aptitude for drawing was first displayed.

He graduated in 1845, and began to attend classes at the Imperial Academy of Arts with Fyodor Bruni, intending to become a history painter. Soon, however, he discovered a preference for painting scenes from everyday life.

While there, he made the first known portrait of Fyodor Dostoyevsky, (his former fellow student at the engineering school), became involved in the Petrashevsky Circle and narrowly avoided arrest. In 1849 he returned to the relative safety of his family estate in Malorossiya, which soon passed to him, following his mother's death. He painted throughout the local Malorossian villages, visiting Saint Petersburg or Moscow only to arrange exhibitions.

In the early 1850s, he published an Album of Scenes of Malorossian Life and, in 1856, was awarded the title of "Free Artist". In the late 1850s, he toured Germany and became a corresponding member of the "Royal Society of Belgian Watercolorists". He settled in Saint Petersburg in 1858, after the death of his second wife, who had become ill during their travels.

In 1861, he was named an "Academician" for his portrayal of a Russian khorovod. From 1871 to 1881, he served as an inspector for the Moscow School of Painting, Sculpture and Architecture then, once again, returned to his estate where he created numerous oils, watercolors and drawings of the landlord class, as well as the peasants. He continued to exhibit abroad; in London, Paris and Antwerp. A major posthumous retrospective was held in Moscow in 1893.

In addition to his paintings, he illustrated several works by Nikolai Gogol, Mikhail Lermontov, Marko Vovchok, Taras Shevchenko and Ivan Krylov. He was related, by his first marriage, to Sergey Aksakov. His third wife was a lateral descendant of Alexander Griboyedov.

== Selected paintings ==
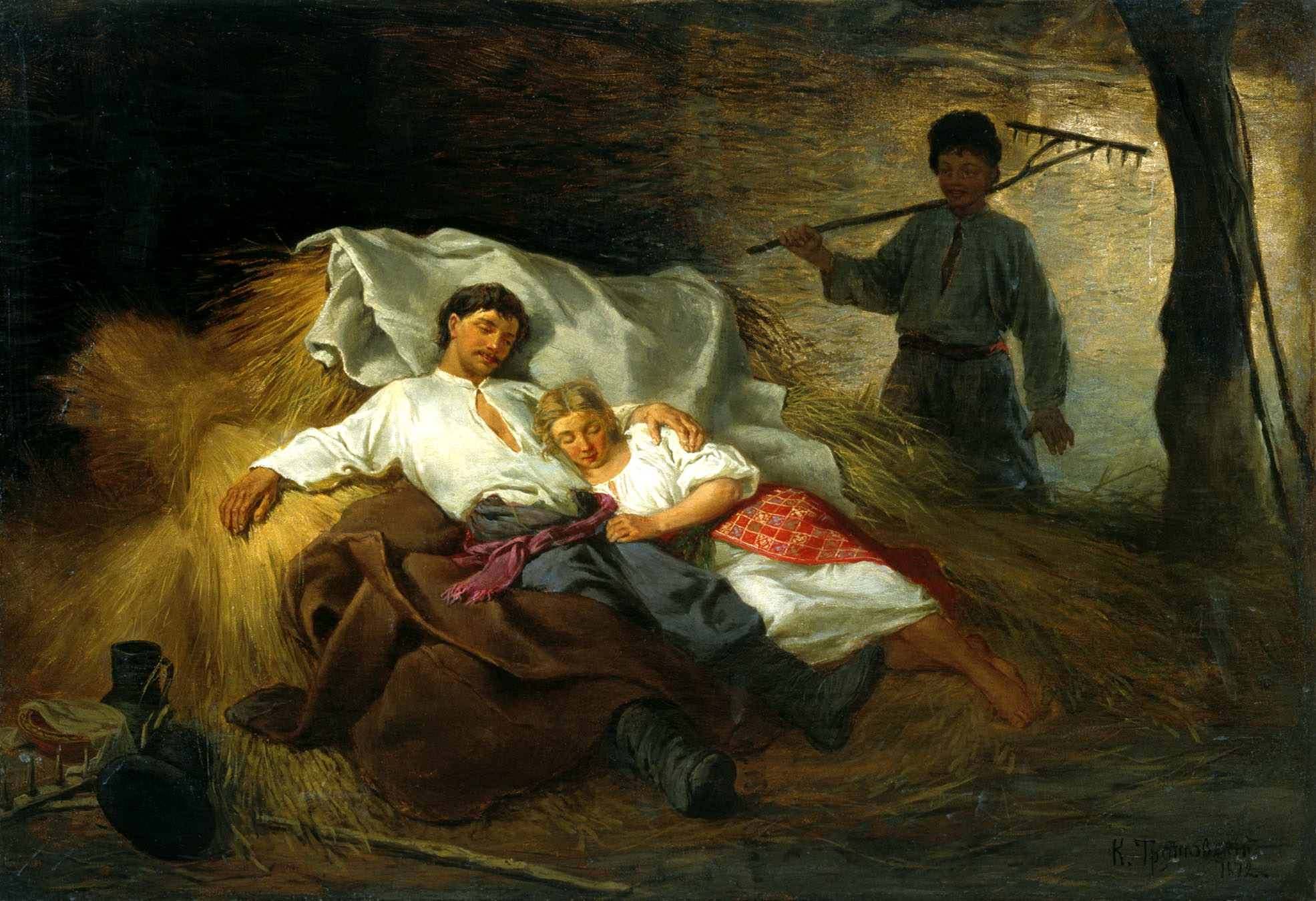
In the Hayloft

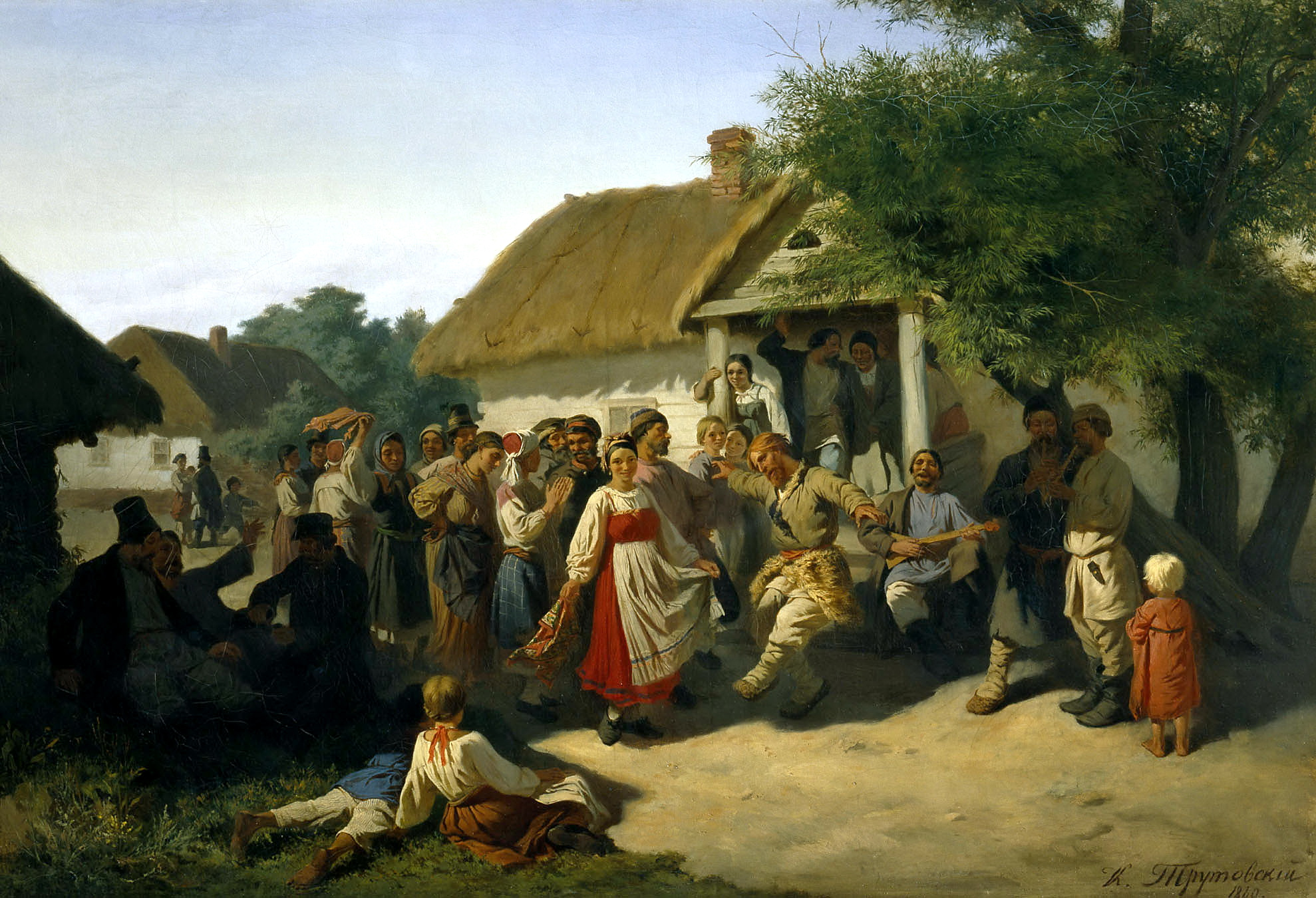
A Khorovod in Kursk

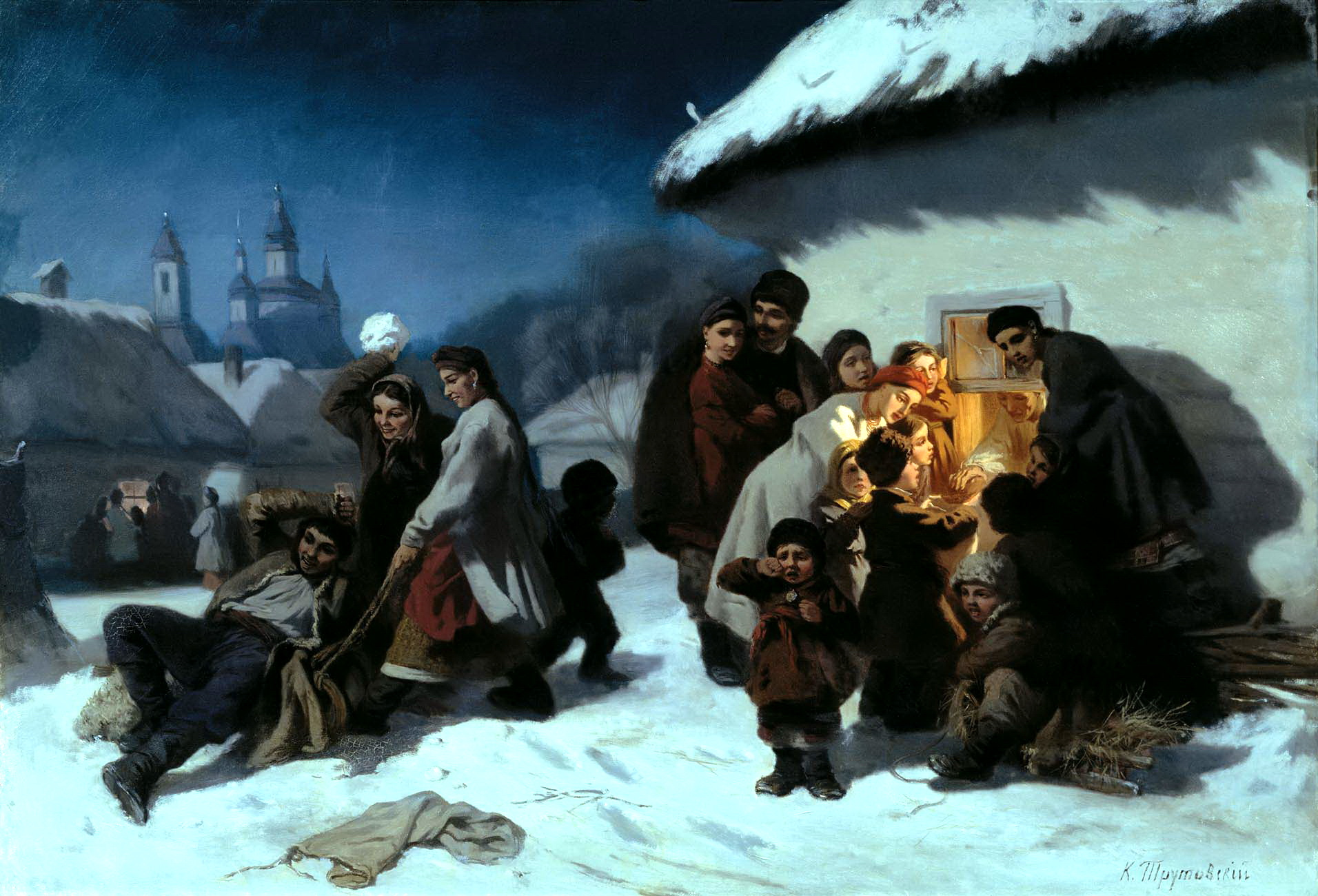
Caroling in Malorossiya

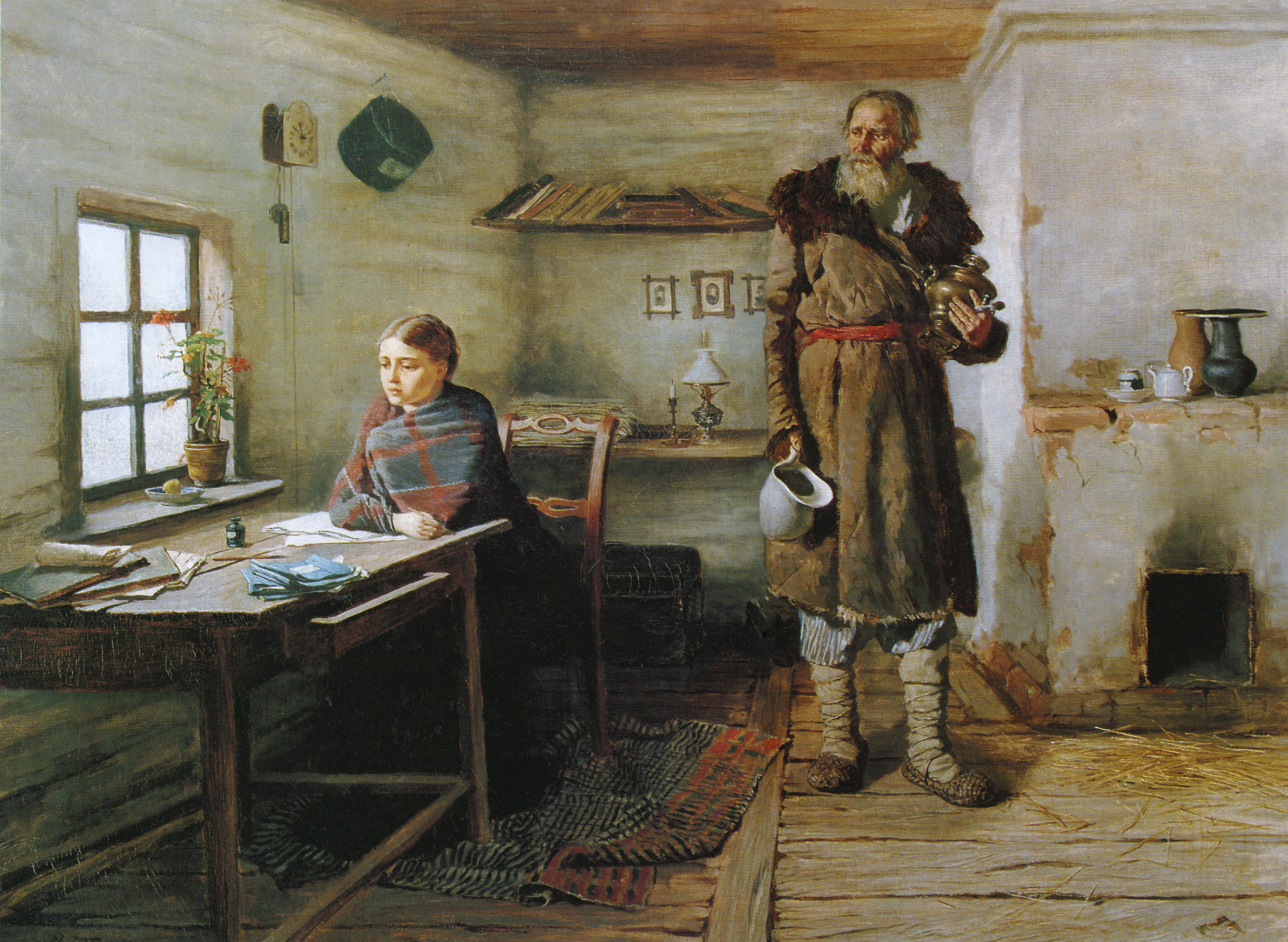
Rural Teacher
