= Alexei Tomanov =

Russian politician (born 1981)

- Алексей Томанов

Member of the Kursk Oblast Duma
- Incumbent
- Assumed office 19 September 2021

Personal details
- Born: 2 March 1981 (age 45) Kursk, Russian SFSR, USSR
- Party: Liberal Democratic Party of Russia
- Education: Kursk State University
- Profession: Politician

Alexei Yuryevich Tomanov (Russian: Алексей Юрьевич Томанов; born 2 March 1981) is a Russian politician who currently serves as a member of the Kursk Oblast Duma since 19 September 2021.

== Biography ==
=== Early life ===
After graduating from the Kursk State University, Tomanov began his political career.

=== Kursk Oblast Duma ===
In the 2021 Russian regional elections, Tomanov was elected as a member of the Kursk Oblast Duma from Liberal Democratic Party of Russia.

In the regional parliament, he became deputy chair of the Committee on Physical Culture, Sports, Youth Policy, and Interaction with Public Associations.
