= Governor of Kursk Oblast =

Highest-ranking official in Kursk Oblast, Russia

- Губернатор Курской области (Russian)
- Standart of governor Kursk oblast

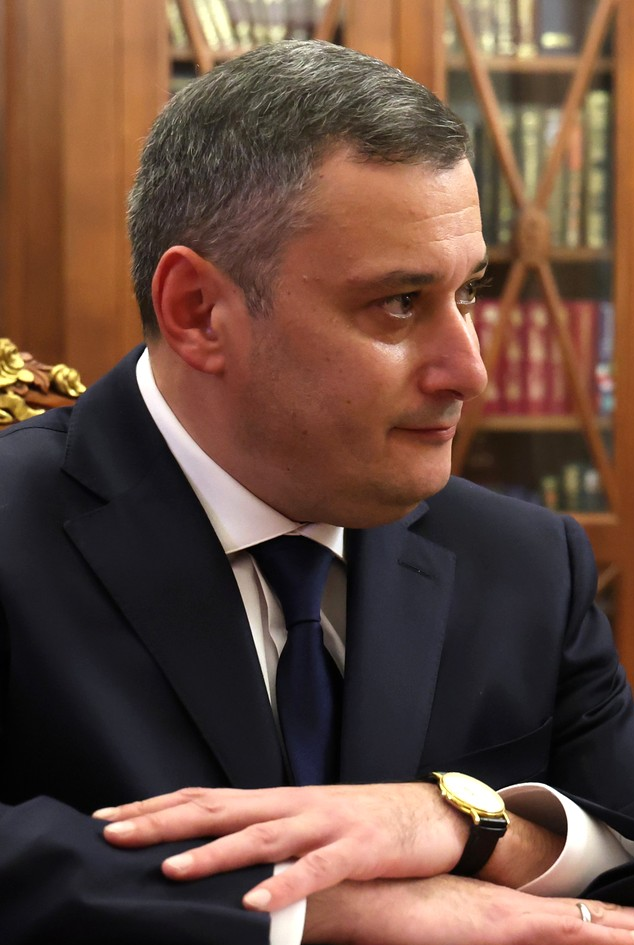
- Incumbent; Alexander Khinshtein since 21 September 2025
- Seat: Kursk
- Term length: 5 years
- Formation: 1991
- First holder: Vasily Shuteyev
- Website: kursk.ru

The Governor of Kursk Oblast (Russian: Губернатор Курской области) is the head of government of Kursk Oblast, a federal subject of Russia.

The position was introduced in 1991 as Head of Administration of Kursk Oblast. The Governor is elected by direct popular vote for a term of five years and can hold the position for two consecutive terms.

== List of officeholders ==
No.	Portrait	Name (birth–death)	Term of office			Political party	Elected	Ref.
No.	Portrait	Name (birth–death)	Took office	Left office	Time in office	Political party	Elected	Ref.
1		Vasily Shuteyev (born 1942)	11 December 1991	23 October 1996	4 years, 317 days	Independent	–	
2		Alexander Rutskoy (born 1947)	23 October 1996	18 November 2000	4 years, 26 days	Derzhava	1996	
3		Alexander Mikhailov (1951–2020)	18 November 2000	11 October 2018	17 years, 327 days	Communist	2000; 2005; 2010; 2014	
3		Alexander Mikhailov (1951–2020)	18 November 2000	11 October 2018	17 years, 327 days	United Russia	2000; 2005; 2010; 2014	
–		Roman Starovoyt (1972–2025)	11 October 2018	16 September 2019	340 days	United Russia	–	
4		Roman Starovoyt (1972–2025)	16 September 2019	12 May 2024	4 years, 239 days	United Russia	2019	
–		Alexei Smirnov (born 1973)	12 May 2024	16 September 2024	127 days	Independent	–	
5		Alexei Smirnov (born 1973)	16 September 2024	5 December 2024	80 days	United Russia	2024	
–		Alexander Khinstein (born 1974)	5 December 2024	21 September 2025	290 days	United Russia	–	
6		Alexander Khinstein (born 1974)	21 September 2025	Incumbent	351 days	United Russia	2025	
