= Novooskolsky Uyezd =

Novooskolsky Uyezd (Russian: Новооско́льский уе́зд; Ukrainian: Новооскольський повіт, romanized: Novooskolskyi povit) was one of the subdivisions of the Kursk Governorate of the Russian Empire. It was situated in the southeastern part of the governorate. Its administrative centre was Novy Oskol.

== Demographics ==
At the time of the Russian Empire Census of 1897, Novooskolsky Uyezd had a population of 157,849. Of these, 51.0% spoke Ukrainian and 48.9% Russian as their native language.
