= List of chairmen of the Kursk Oblast Duma =

The Chairman of the Kursk Oblast Duma is the presiding officer of that legislature.

Below is a list of office-holders:

Name	Took office	Left office
Yuri Pyatnitsky	1994	1997
Viktor Chernyk	1997	2001
Aleksandr Anpilov	2001	2006
Aleksandr Kichigin	2006	2011
Viktor Karamychev	2011	Present

== Sources ==
- Kursk Oblast Duma
