= Starooskolsky Uyezd =

Starooskolsky Uyezd (Старооско́льский уе́зд) was one of the subdivisions of the Kursk Governorate of the Russian Empire. It was situated in the eastern part of the governorate. Its administrative centre was Stary Oskol.

== Demographics ==
At the time of the Russian Empire Census of 1897, Starooskolsky Uyezd had a population of 146,009. Of these, 91.3% spoke Russian, 8.4% Ukrainian, 0.1% Yiddish and 0.1% Romani as their native language.
