= Donetsk–Krivoy Rog Soviet Republic =

1918 self-declared republic of the Russian SFSR

Coordinates: 49.9000°N 36.3000°E

Donetsk–Krivoy Rog Soviet Republic Донецко-Криворожская советская республика
- 1918
- A red flag

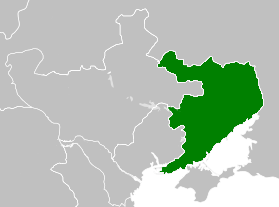
- Map of the territory claimed by the Donetsk–Krivoy Rog Republic in March 1918 (in green)
- Status: Unrecognized, self-declared entity
- Capital: Kharkiv, later Luhansk
- Government: Soviet republic
- Chairman of the Sovnarkom
  - 1918: Fyodor Sergeyev
- Legislature: Soviet
- Historical era: World War I
  - Established: 12 February 1918
  - Incorporated into the Ukrainian Soviet Republic: 20 March 1918
- Currency: Ruble
Preceded by	Succeeded by
Russian SFSR; Ukrainian People's Republic	Ukrainian Soviet Republic
- Today part of: Ukraine; Russia

The Donetsk–Krivoy Rog Soviet Republic or Donetsk–Kryvyi Rih Soviet Republic (Russian: Донецко-Криворожская советская республика, romanized: Donetsko-Krivorozhskaya sovyetskaya respublika; Ukrainian: Донецько-Криворізька Радянська Республіка, romanized: Donetsko-Kryvorizka Radianska Respublika) was a self-declared Soviet republic of the Ukrainian People's Republic of Soviets proclaimed on 12 February 1918. It was founded three days after the government of the Ukrainian People's Republic (UPR) signed its Treaty of Brest-Litovsk with the Central Powers, which recognised the borders of the UPR. Lenin did not support the creation of the entity and neither did Sverdlov. Some other Bolsheviks like Elena Stasova, however, sent a telegraph of best wishes.

On 3 March 1918 a separate Treaty of Brest-Litovsk was signed between Soviet Russia and the Central Powers (Germany, Austria-Hungary, the Ottoman Empire, and Bulgaria), by which Russia withdrew from World War I. The Article III of the treaty stated that "the territories lying to the west of the line agreed upon by the contracting parties which formerly belonged to Russia, will no longer be subject to Russian sovereignty" and "the future status of these territories will be determined in agreement with their population".

The Donetsk–Krivoy Rog Soviet Republic claimed the territories south of the neighbouring Ukrainian People's Republic, including the Kharkov, Yekaterinoslav, and part of the Kherson Governorates. In the beginning, the republic's capital was the city of Kharkiv, but later with the retreat of the Red Guard it moved to Luhansk. The newly created government challenged the authority of the General Secretariat of Ukraine and the People's Secretariat. Some of the commissars held positions as secretaries in another Bolshevik government in Ukraine, the People's Secretariat.

The Donetsk–Krivoy Rog Soviet Republic was disbanded at the second All-Ukrainian Congress of Soviets on 20 March 1918 when the independence of Soviet Ukraine was announced. The Donetsk–Krivoy Rog Soviet Republic failed to achieve recognition, either internationally or by the Russian SFSR, and in accordance with the March 1918 second Treaty of Brest-Litovsk was abolished.

The Donetsk–Krivoy Rog Soviet Republic was invoked during the war in Donbas (started 2014), when the legislature of the unrecognised separatist Donetsk People's Republic (DPR) adopted a memorandum on 5 February 2015 declaring itself the successor to the Donetsk–Krivoy Rog Soviet Republic, and Artyom as founding father.

== Government ==
- Chairman – Fyodor Sergeyev ("Artyom")
- People's Commissariat for Internal Affairs – S. Vasilchenko
- People's Commissariat for Financial Affairs – Valery Mezhlauk
- People's Commissariat for Labour – B. Magidov
- People's Commissariat for National Enlightenment – M. Zhakov
- People's Commissariat for Legal Affairs – V. Filov
- People's Commissariat for Military Affairs – Moisei Rukhimovich
- People's Commissariat for State Control – A. Kamensky

After a government crisis and resignation of Vasilchenko, Zhakov and Filov on 29 March 1918, the Sovnarkom relocated from Kharkiv to Luhansk.

- Chairman – Fyodor Sergeyev ("Artyom")
  - Deputy Chairman – Yu. Lutovinov ("Ivan")
- People's Commissariat for Internal Affairs – I. Yakimovich
- People's Commissariat for Finance – Valery Mezhlauk
- People's Commissariat for Labour – B. Magidov
- People's Commissariat for Enlightenment – Ya. Istomin
- People's Commissariat for Justice – A. Chervyakov
- People's Commissariat for Provision – I. Alekseyev ("Koom")
- People's Commissariat for Military Affairs – Moisei Rukhimovich
- People's Commissariat for State Control – A. Kamensky
- People's Commissariat for Posts and Telegraphs – Innokentiy Kozhevnikov
- People's Commissariat for Public Property – A. Puzyryov
- Director of Sovnarkom Affairs – A. Povzner

== See also ==
- Novorossiya
- Russians in Ukraine
- Crimean Khanate
- Sloboda Ukraine
- People's Secretariat
- Novorossiya (confederation)
