= Timsky Uyezd =

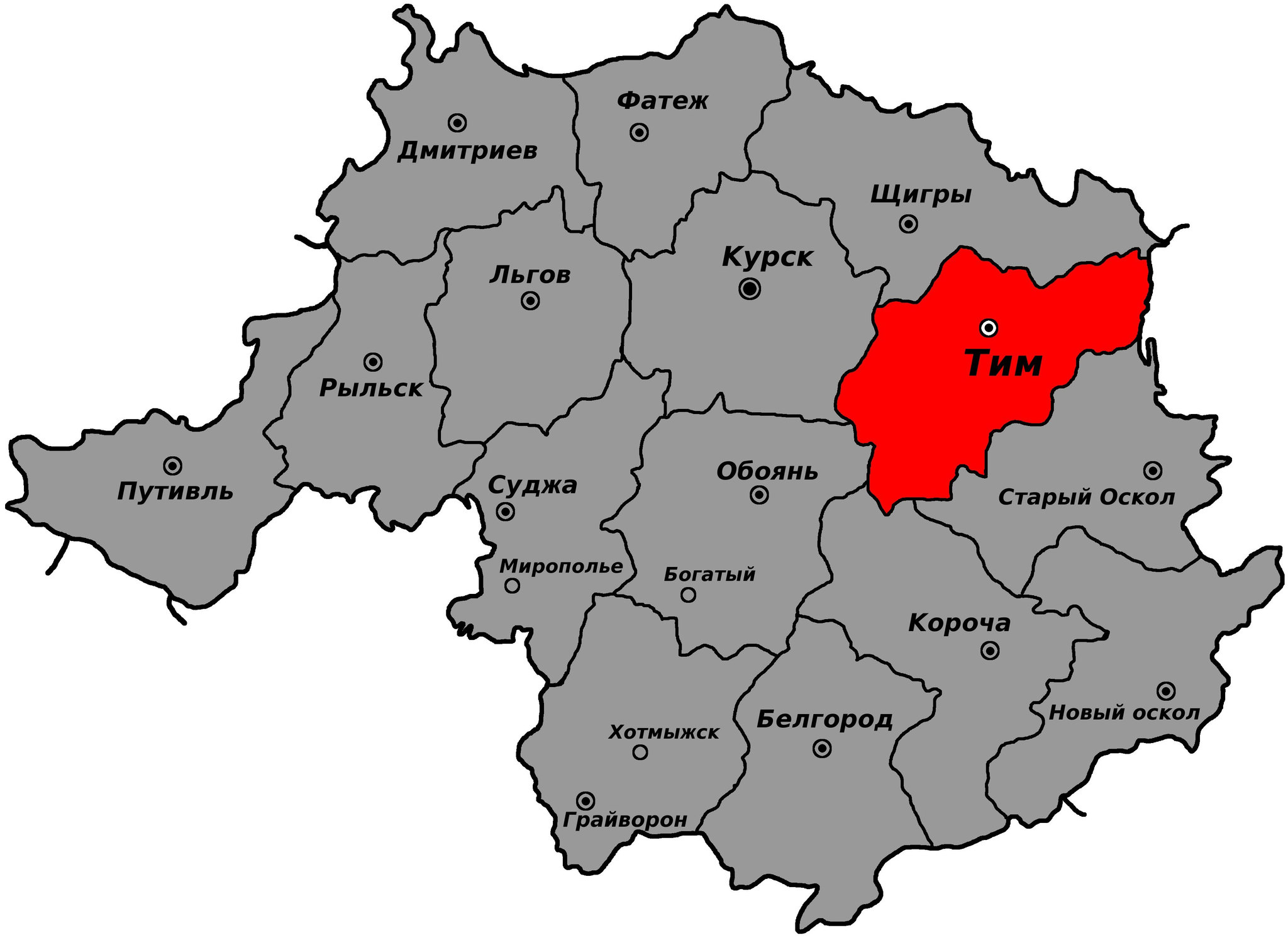
Timsky Uzeyd highlighted in red

Timsky Uyezd (Ти́мский уе́зд) was one of the subdivisions of the Kursk Governorate of the Russian Empire. It was situated in the northeastern part of the governorate, with its administrative centre in Tim.

== Demographics ==
At the time of the Russian Empire Census of 1897, Timsky Uyezd had a population of 141,416. Of these, 98.9% spoke Russian and 1.1% Ukrainian as their native language.
