= Alexander Khinshtein =

Russian journalist and politician

- Александр Хинштейн
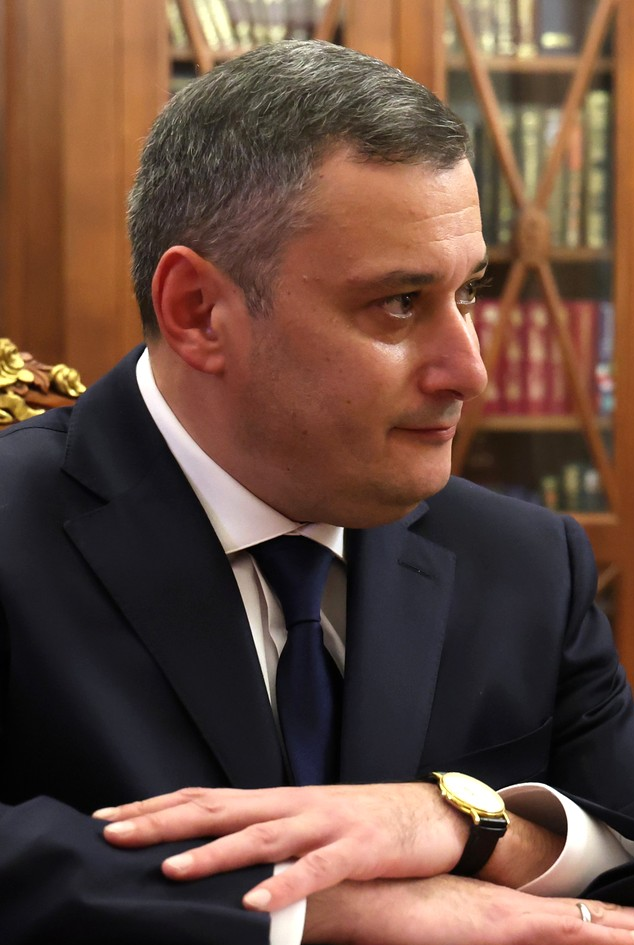
- Khinshtein in 2024

Governor of Kursk Oblast
- Incumbent
- Assumed office 21 September 2025
- President: Vladimir Putin
- Preceded by: Alexei Smirnov

Chairman of the State Duma committee on information policy
- In office 22 January 2020 – 11 December 2024
- Preceded by: Leonid Levin
- Succeeded by: Sergey Boyarsky

Deputy of the State Duma Russia
- In office 29 December 2003 – 11 December 2024
- Preceded by: Nikolay Kosterin
- Constituency: Nizhny Novgorod Oblast; Semyonov (No.122); Samara (No. 158)

Advisor to the director of the Russian National Guard
- In office 24 October 2016 – 9 September 2018

Personal details
- Born: 26 October 1974 (age 51) Moscow, Russian SFSR, Soviet Union
- Party: United Russia
- Spouses: Yulia Fedotova (divorced): Olga Polyakova
- Children: 2
- Education: Moscow State University; Moscow MVD University; RANEPA
- Occupation: Journalist
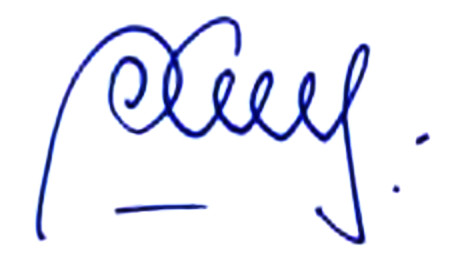
- Signature

Military service
- Branch/service: National Guard of Russia; National Guard Forces Command
- Years of service: 2016–2018
- Rank: Junior lieutenant

Alexander Yevseyevich Khinshtein (Russian: Александр Евсеевич Хинштейн; born 26 October 1974) is a Russian politician and former journalist who has served as governor of Kursk Oblast since 21 September 2025.

== Biography ==
Alexander Khinshtein was born on October 26, 1974 in Moscow.

He graduated from high school in 1991. In 1996-2001, Khinshtein studied at the Faculty of Journalism at Moscow State University.

In 2007 he graduated from the Moscow University of the Ministry of Internal Affairs, majoring in law. In 2013 he completed the Presidential Reserve Management Training program at the RANEPA.

== Career ==
In 2003 he was elected to the State Duma and joined United Russia.

He is a deputy from the Samara constituency of the State Duma of the Russian Federal Assembly. He was a member of the 4th, 5th, 6th and 7th State Dumas. Until 2024, he was a member of the 8th State Duma. Deputy Secretary of the General Council of United Russia since 23 November 2019, Chairman of the Committee of the State Duma of the Federal Assembly of the Russian Federation on Information Policy, Information Technologies and Communications since 22 January 2020.

He is one of the architects of anti-LGBT legislation that bans "promoting LGBT propaganda", saying, "LGBT today is an element of hybrid warfare and in this hybrid warfare we must protect our values, our society and our children,"

Khinshtein supported the Russian invasion of Ukraine. On 4 March 2022, the Duma passed a law introducing prison terms of up to 15 years for spreading "fake news" about Russia's military operation in Ukraine. Khinshtein said the law "concerns all citizens, not only Russian ones, because we are talking about actions against Russia."

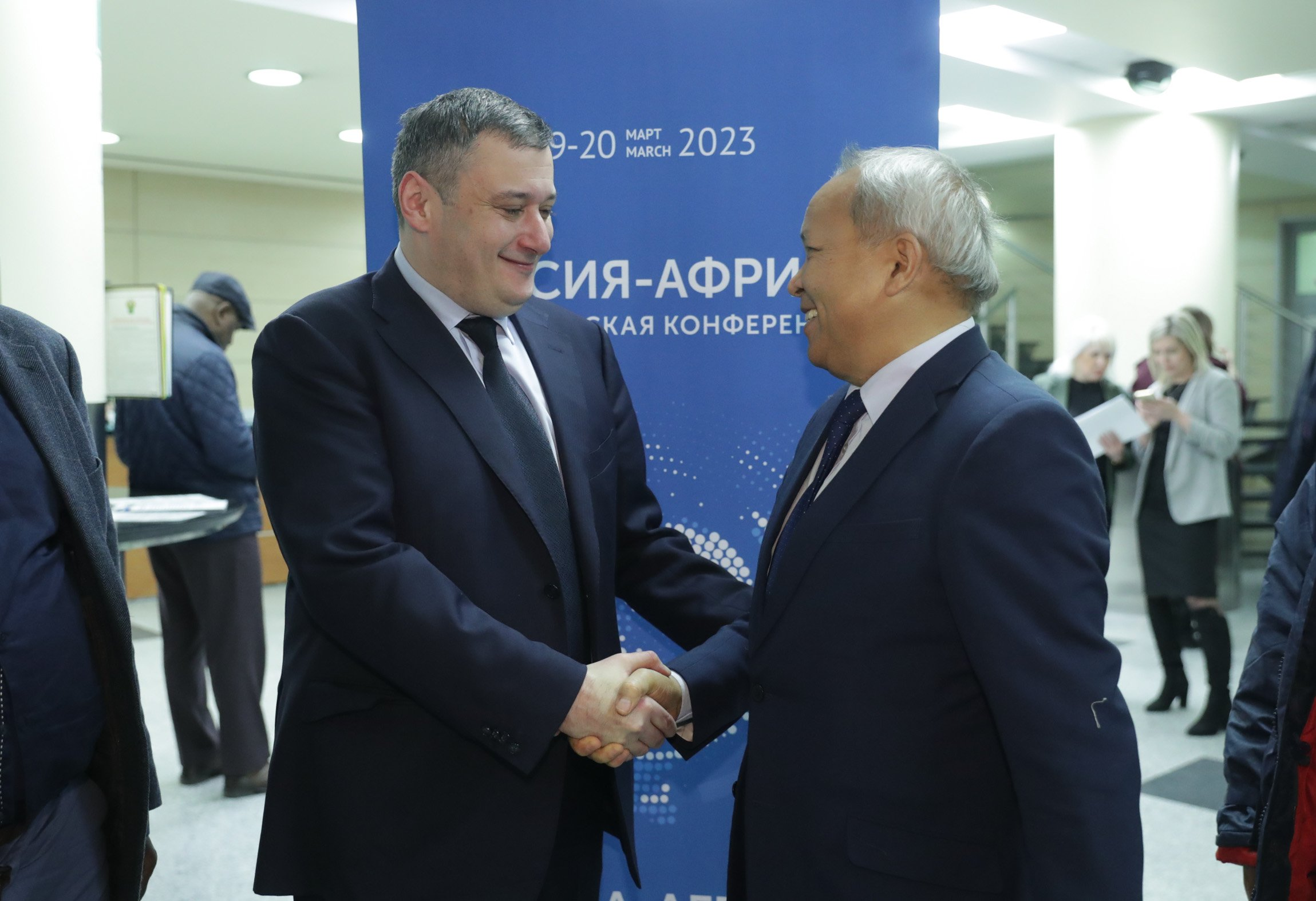
Khinshtein with a member of the Madagascar delegation at the 2nd International Parliamentary Conference “Russia-Africa” in Moscow, 18 March 2023

On 5 December 2024, Khinshtein was appointed as acting governor of Kursk Oblast by President Vladimir Putin. He was elected governor the following year with 86.9% of the vote.

== Personal life ==
Khinshtein was born in Russia to a Jewish family. His father Yevsey Abramovich Khinshtein and mother Inna Abramovna Regirer are engineers.

=== Sanctions ===
He was sanctioned by the UK government in 2022 in relation to the Russo-Ukrainian War. Khinshtein has also been sanctioned by the United States, the EU, the United Kingdom, Canada, and Australia.

== Honours and awards ==
- Order of Honour
- 2nd class Medal of the Order "For Merit to the Fatherland" (2003)
- Medal Defender of a Free Russia
- Medal of Zhukov
- Jubilee Medal "300 Years of the Russian Navy"
- Medal "In Commemoration of the 300th Anniversary of Saint Petersburg"
- Medal "In Commemoration of the 800th Anniversary of Moscow"
- Order of Alexander Nevsky
- Order of Friendship
- 4th class Order "For Merit to the Fatherland"

== Personal life ==
Married twice. In 2008 he divorced his first wife, Yulia Fedotova. In 2016 he married actress Olga Polyakova (the pseudonym is Polya Polyakova), the couple have two sons: Artyom (born in 2014) and Lev (born in 2017).
