= Alexei Smirnov (politician) =

Russian politician (born 1973)

- Алексей Смирнов
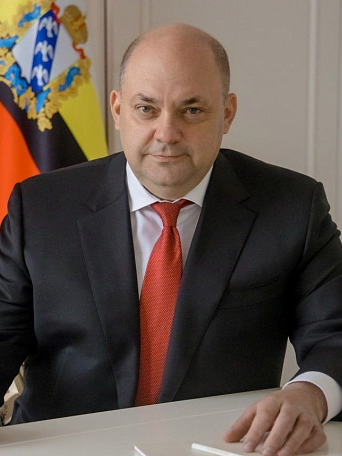
- Smirnov in 2024

5th Governor of Kursk Oblast
- In office 16 September – 5 December 2024; Acting: 15 May 2024 – 16 September 2024
- Preceded by: Roman Starovoyt
- Succeeded by: Alexander Khinshtein

Personal details
- Born: Alexei Borisovich Smirnov; 27 May 1973 (age 53) Navlya, Bryansk Oblast, Russian SFSR
- Party: United Russia (since 2024)
- Other political affiliations: Independent (until 2024)
- Education: Kursk State Agrarian University

Alexei Borisovich Smirnov (Russian: Алексей Борисович Смирнов; born 27 May 1973) is a Russian politician. He was the Governor of Kursk Oblast from 16 September 2024 to 5 December 2024.

== Biography ==
In 1995, Alexei Smirnov graduated from the Kursk State Agrarian University. In 2001, he also obtained a degree from the Oryol Regional Academy of Public Administration. From 1998 to 2004, Smirnov held various positions in the Housing and Utilities Committee of the Kursk Oblast. Initially, he worked as a consultant in the department of development of household and communal services and licensing. Later, he was appointed head of the economic department, deputy chairman of the committee, and first deputy chairman of the committee.

From 2010 to 2011, Smirnov worked at the non-profit partnership "Association of Construction Organizations of Small and Medium-sized Businesses" as director of the Kursk branch and advisor to the president. He left the position to become the deputy head of Sergiyev Posad's administration. From 2011 to 2012, he was also an advisor to the Minister of Housing and Communal Services of Moscow Oblast, and head of the department for standardization and reconstruction of objects of housing and communal purpose.

From 2012 to 2015, he served as deputy minister of Moscow Oblast's construction complex. On 4 July 2016, he was appointed first deputy general director of the Fund for the Capital Repair of Multi-Apartment Buildings in Moscow.

Alexei Smirnov was appointed deputy governor of Kursk Oblast on 3 November 2018 and first deputy governor in March 2021.

From 2022 to 2024, Smirnov also held the position of chairman of the government of Kursk Oblast.

On 12 May 2024, by decree of Vladimir Putin, he was appointed acting governor of Kursk Oblast. His predecessor, Roman Starovoyt, took the position of the Minister of Transport. Smirnov resigned on 5 December amid criticism over his handling of the 2024 Kursk offensive.

=== Criminal prosecution ===
On 16 April 2025, Smirnov was arrested as part of an investigation into the alleged embezzlement of public funds to build defensive fortifications along the border with Ukraine. He was convicted and sentenced to 14 years' imprisonment on 6 April 2026.
