= Oboyansky Uyezd =

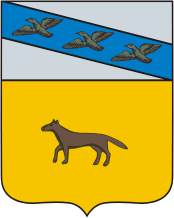
Kursk Governorate 1780

Oboyansky Uyezd (Обоя́нский уе́зд) was one of the subdivisions of the Kursk Governorate of the Russian Empire. It was situated in the central part of the governorate. Its administrative centre was Oboyan.

== Demographics ==
At the time of the Russian Empire Census of 1897, Oboyansky Uyezd had a population of 181,052. Of these, 89.0% spoke Russian, 10.7% Ukrainian and 0.1% Yiddish as their native language.
