= Belgorodsky Uyezd =

Uyezd of Kursk Governorate, Russian Empire

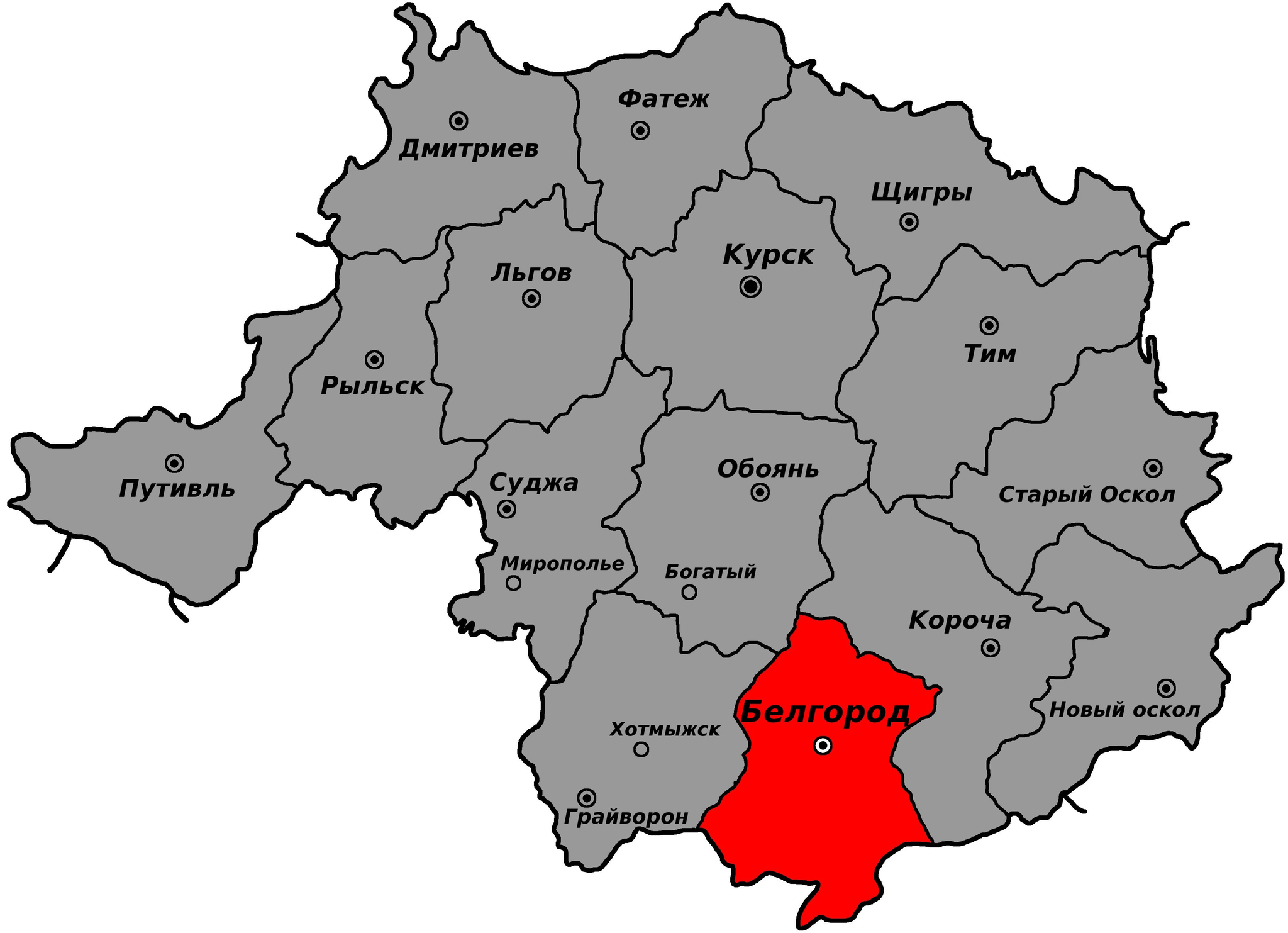

Belgorodsky Uyezd (Russian: Белгоро́дский уе́зд; Ukrainian: Білгородський повіт, romanized: Bilhorodskyi povit) was one of the subdivisions of the Kursk Governorate of the Russian Empire. It was situated in the southern part of the governorate. Its administrative centre was Belgorod.

== Demographics ==
At the time of the Russian Empire Census of 1897, Belgorodsky Uyezd had a population of 174,299. Of these, 78.0% spoke Russian, 21.2% Ukrainian, 0.3% Polish, 0.3% Yiddish, 0.1% German and 0.1% Romani as their native language.
