= Fatezhsky Uyezd =

Subdivision of Kursk Governorate, Russian Empire

Fatezhsky Uyezd (Фате́жский уе́зд) was one of the subdivisions of the Kursk Governorate of the Russian Empire. It was situated in the northern part of the governorate. Its administrative centre was Fatezh.

== Demographics ==
At the time of the Russian Empire Census of 1897, Fatezhsky Uyezd had a population of 125,485. Of these, 99.9% spoke Russian and 0.1% Yiddish as their native language.
