= Kursk Governorate =

1796–1928 unit of Russia

Coordinates: 51.7167°N 36.1833°E

Kursk Governorate Курская губерния
- Governorate of the Russian Empire (1796-1917), Russian Republic and RSFSR (1917–1928)
- 1796–1928
- Coat of arms

- Location in the Russian Empire
- Capital: Kursk
- Area
  - 1914: 46,455 km^{2} (17,936 sq mi)
  - 1926: 43,653 km^{2} (16,855 sq mi)
- Population
  - 1914: 3,256,600
  - 1926: 2,906,360
- History
  - Established: 12 December 1796
  - Disestablished: 1928
Preceded by	Succeeded by
Kursk Viceroyalty	Central Black Earth Oblast
- Today part of: Russia; Ukraine

Kursk Governorate (Russian: Курская губерния, romanized: Kurskaya guberniya) was an administrative-territorial unit (guberniya) of the Russian Empire, which existed from 1796 to 1928 with its capital in Kursk.

== Administrative divisions ==
As of 1914, Kursk Governorate included 15 uyezds.

- Belgorodsky Uyezd
- Grayvoronsky Uyezd
- Dmitriyevsky Uyezd
- Korochansky Uyezd
- Kursky Uyezd
- Lgovsky Uyezd
- Novooskolsky Uyezd
- Oboyansky Uyezd
- Putivlsky Uyezd
- Rylsky Uyezd
- Starooskolsky Uyezd
- Sudzhansky Uyezd
- Timsky Uyezd
- Fatezhsky Uyezd
- Shchigrovsky Uyezd

== Symbolic ==
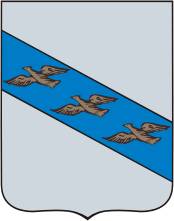
Coat of arms of the governorate before 1857

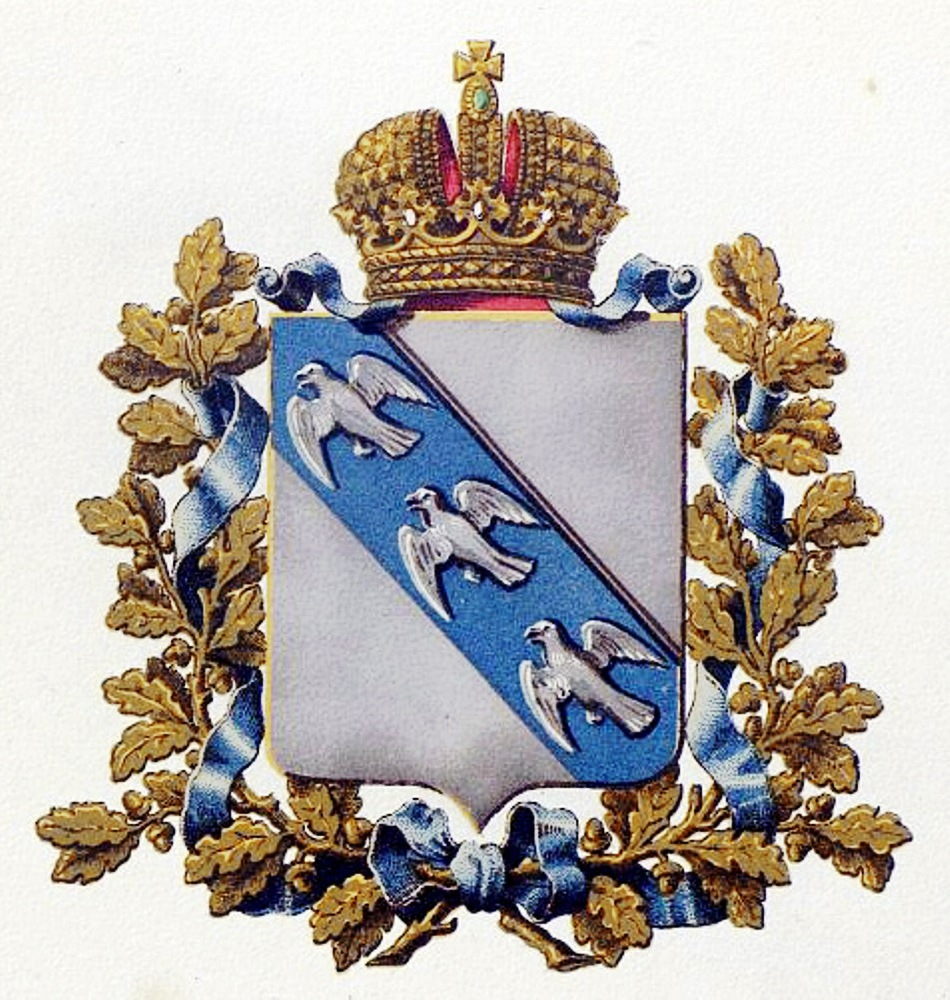
Coat of arms of the governorate (1880)
