= Kursk Oblast Duma =

Regional parliament of Kursk Oblast, Russia

Kursk Oblast Duma Курская областная дума
- 7th legislature

Type
- Type: Unicameral

Leadership
- Chairman: Yury Amerev, United Russia since 7 October 2021

Structure
- Seats: 45
- Political groups: United Russia (31) CPRF (7); LDPR (2); SRZP (2); New People (1); RPPSJ (1) Independent (1)

Elections
- Voting system: Mixed
- Last election: 19 September 2021
- Next election: 2026

Meeting place
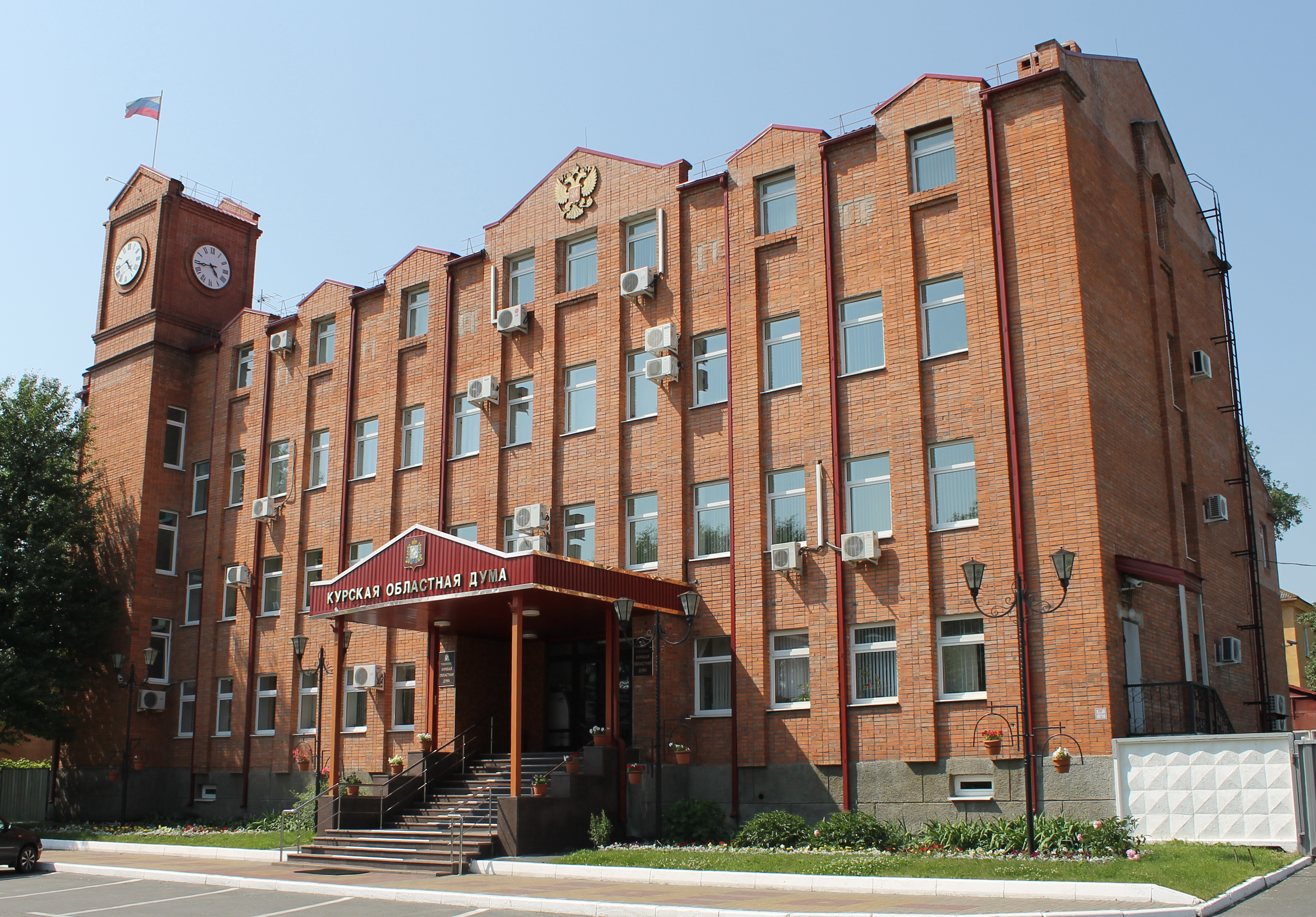
- 24 Sofiy Perovskoy Street, Kursk

Website
- kurskduma.ru

The Kursk Oblast Duma (Russian: Курская областная дума, romanized: Kurskaya oblastnaya duma) is the regional parliament of Kursk Oblast, a federal subject of Russia. A total of 45 deputies are elected for five-year terms.

== Elections ==
=== 2021 ===
Party	%	Seats
United Russia	42.97	31
Communist Party of the Russian Federation	20.71	7
Liberal Democratic Party of Russia	11.71	2
A Just Russia	9.24	2
New People	7.18	1
Russian Party of Pensioners for Social Justice	5.49	1
Self-nominated	—	1
Registered voters/turnout	46.46	
