= Petrovsky (inhabited locality) =

Petrovsky (Russian: Петро́вский; masculine), Petrovskaya (Петро́вская; feminine), or Petrovskoye (Петро́вское; neuter) is the name of various inhabited localities in Russia.

== Modern localities ==
=== Altai Krai ===
As of 2012, two rural localities in Altai Krai bear this name:

- Petrovsky, Novichikhinsky District, Altai Krai, a settlement in Lobanikhinsky Selsoviet of Novichikhinsky District; 52°16′N 81°38′E
- Petrovsky, Pankrushikhinsky District, Altai Krai, a settlement in Lukovsky Selsoviet of Pankrushikhinsky District; 54°1′N 80°15′E

=== Arkhangelsk Oblast ===
As of 2012, three rural localities in Arkhangelsk Oblast bear this name:

- Petrovskaya, Kargopolsky District, Arkhangelsk Oblast, a village in Pechnikovsky Selsoviet of Kargopolsky District
- Petrovskaya, Kotlassky District, Arkhangelsk Oblast, a village in Revazhsky Selsoviet of Kotlassky District
- Petrovskaya, Shenkursky District, Arkhangelsk Oblast, a village in Nikolsky Selsoviet of Shenkursky District

=== Astrakhan Oblast ===
As of 2012, one rural locality in Astrakhan Oblast bears this name:

- Petrovsky, Astrakhan Oblast, a settlement in Sedlistinsky Selsoviet of Ikryaninsky District; 45°50′N 47°40′E

=== Republic of Bashkortostan ===
As of 2012, three rural localities in the Republic of Bashkortostan bear this name:

- Petrovsky, Republic of Bashkortostan, a khutor in Alexandrovsky Selsoviet of Meleuzovsky District
- Petrovskoye, Iglinsky District, Republic of Bashkortostan, a village in Kaltovsky Selsoviet of Iglinsky District
- Petrovskoye, Ishimbaysky District, Republic of Bashkortostan, a selo in Petrovsky Selsoviet of Ishimbaysky District

=== Belgorod Oblast ===
As of 2012, four rural localities in Belgorod Oblast bear this name:

- Petrovsky, Chernyansky District, Belgorod Oblast, a khutor in Chernyansky District
- Petrovsky, Prokhorovsky District, Belgorod Oblast, a khutor in Prokhorovsky District
- Petrovsky, Rakityansky District, Belgorod Oblast, a khutor under the administrative jurisdiction of Proletarsky Settlement Okrug in Rakityansky District
- Petrovsky, Starooskolsky District, Belgorod Oblast, a settlement in Starooskolsky District

=== Bryansk Oblast ===
As of 2012, three rural localities in Bryansk Oblast bear this name:

- Petrovsky, Klimovsky District, Bryansk Oblast, a settlement in Istopsky Rural Administrative Okrug of Klimovsky District; 52°26′N 32°31′E
- Petrovsky, Pochepsky District, Bryansk Oblast, a settlement in Krasnorogsky Rural Administrative Okrug of Pochepsky District; 52°49′N 33°43′E
- Petrovsky, Surazhsky District, Bryansk Oblast, a settlement in Ovchinsky Rural Administrative Okrug of Surazhsky District; 53°4′N 32°27′E

=== Chelyabinsk Oblast ===
As of 2012, four rural localities in Chelyabinsk Oblast bear this name:

- Petrovsky, Krasnoarmeysky District, Chelyabinsk Oblast, a settlement in Petrovsky Selsoviet of Krasnoarmeysky District
- Petrovsky, Nagaybaksky District, Chelyabinsk Oblast, a settlement in Nagaybaksky Selsoviet of Nagaybaksky District
- Petrovsky, Oktyabrsky District, Chelyabinsk Oblast, a settlement in Krutoyarsky Selsoviet of Oktyabrsky District
- Petrovskoye, Chelyabinsk Oblast, a selo in Petrovsky Selsoviet of Uvelsky District

=== Ivanovo Oblast ===
As of 2012, five inhabited localities in Ivanovo Oblast bear this name.

Urban localities

- Petrovsky, Ivanovo Oblast, a settlement in Gavrilovo-Posadsky District

Rural localities

- Petrovskoye, Ivanovsky District, Ivanovo Oblast, a village in Ivanovsky District
- Petrovskoye, Komsomolsky District, Ivanovo Oblast, a village in Komsomolsky District
- Petrovskoye, Lezhnevsky District, Ivanovo Oblast, a selo in Lezhnevsky District
- Petrovskoye, Privolzhsky District, Ivanovo Oblast, a village in Privolzhsky District

=== Kaliningrad Oblast ===
As of 2012, one rural locality in Kaliningrad Oblast bears this name:

- Petrovskoye, Kaliningrad Oblast, a settlement in Prigorodny Rural Okrug of Nesterovsky District

=== Kaluga Oblast ===
As of 2012, four rural localities in Kaluga Oblast bear this name:

- Petrovsky, Lyudinovsky District, Kaluga Oblast, a village in Lyudinovsky District
- Petrovsky, Meshchovsky District, Kaluga Oblast, a settlement in Meshchovsky District
- Petrovskoye, Kuybyshevsky District, Kaluga Oblast, a selo in Kuybyshevsky District
- Petrovskoye, Peremyshlsky District, Kaluga Oblast, a village in Peremyshlsky District

=== Kemerovo Oblast ===
As of 2012, two rural localities in Kemerovo Oblast bear this name:

- Petrovsky, Belovsky District, Kemerovo Oblast, a settlement in Vishnevskaya Rural Territory of Belovsky District; 54°23′N 86°37′E
- Petrovsky, Leninsk-Kuznetsky District, Kemerovo Oblast, a settlement in Dracheninskaya Rural Territory of Leninsk-Kuznetsky District; 54°49′N 86°6′E

=== Kirov Oblast ===
As of 2012, four rural localities in Kirov Oblast bear this name:

- Petrovskoye, Shabalinsky District, Kirov Oblast (or Petrovskaya), a village in Gostovsky Rural Okrug of Shabalinsky District; 58°10′N 46°39′E
- Petrovskoye, Urzhumsky District, Kirov Oblast (or Petrovsky), a selo in Petrovsky Rural Okrug of Urzhumsky District; 57°20′N 49°58′E
- Petrovskaya, Afanasyevsky District, Kirov Oblast, a village in Ichetovkinsky Rural Okrug of Afanasyevsky District; 58°48′N 53°6′E
- Petrovskaya, Oparinsky District, Kirov Oblast, a village in Vazyuksky Rural Okrug of Oparinsky District; 59°41′N 48°18′E

=== Kostroma Oblast ===
As of 2012, six rural localities in Kostroma Oblast bear this name:

- Petrovskoye, Chukhlomsky District, Kostroma Oblast (or Petrovskaya), a village in Petrovskoye Settlement of Chukhlomsky District; 58°45′N 43°1′E
- Petrovskoye, Galichsky District, Kostroma Oblast, a village in Dmitriyevskoye Settlement of Galichsky District; 58°8′N 42°12′E
- Petrovskoye, Nerekhtsky District, Kostroma Oblast, a village in Voskresenskoye Settlement of Nerekhtsky District; 57°31′N 40°40′E
- Petrovskoye, Susaninsky District, Kostroma Oblast, a village in Buyakovskoye Settlement of Susaninsky District; 58°11′N 41°21′E
- Petrovskaya, Oktyabrsky District, Kostroma Oblast, a village in Pokrovskoye Settlement of Oktyabrsky District; 58°57′N 47°6′E
- Petrovskaya, Vokhomsky District, Kostroma Oblast, a village in Lapshinskoye Settlement of Vokhomsky District; 59°4′N 46°32′E

=== Krasnodar Krai ===
As of 2012, three rural localities in Krasnodar Krai bear this name:

- Petrovsky, Krasnodar Krai, a khutor in Sokolovsky Rural Okrug of Gulkevichsky District; 45°13′N 40°39′E
- Petrovskoye, Krasnodar Krai, a selo in Blagodarnensky Rural Okrug of Otradnensky District; 44°29′N 41°40′E
- Petrovskaya, Krasnodar Krai, a stanitsa in Petrovsky Rural Okrug of Slavyansky District; 45°26′N 37°57′E

=== Kurgan Oblast ===
As of 2012, two rural localities in Kurgan Oblast bear this name:

- Petrovskoye, Shchuchansky District, Kurgan Oblast (or Petrovsky, Petrovskaya), a selo in Petrovsky Selsoviet of Shchuchansky District; 55°22′N 62°49′E
- Petrovskoye, Yurgamyshsky District, Kurgan Oblast, a selo in Krasnouralsky Selsoviet of Yurgamyshsky District; 55°18′N 64°23′E

=== Kursk Oblast ===
As of 2012, seven rural localities in Kursk Oblast bear this name:

- Petrovsky, Manturovsky District, Kursk Oblast, a khutor in Repetsky Selsoviet of Manturovsky District
- Petrovsky, Pristensky District, Kursk Oblast, a khutor in Rakitinsky Selsoviet of Pristensky District
- Petrovsky, Zolotukhinsky District, Kursk Oblast, a khutor in Revolyutsionny Selsoviet of Zolotukhinsky District
- Petrovskoye, Khomutovsky District, Kursk Oblast, a selo in Petrovsky Selsoviet of Khomutovsky District
- Petrovskoye, Korenevsky District, Kursk Oblast, a village in Plodosovkhozsky Selsoviet of Korenevsky District
- Petrovskoye, Kursky District, Kursk Oblast, a village in Troitsky Selsoviet of Kursky District
- Petrovskoye, Sovetsky District, Kursk Oblast, a selo in Krasnodolinsky Selsoviet of Sovetsky District

=== Leningrad Oblast ===
As of 2012, two rural localities in Leningrad Oblast bear this name:

- Petrovskoye, Lomonosovsky District, Leningrad Oblast (or Petrovskaya), a village in Orzhitskoye Settlement Municipal Formation of Lomonosovsky District; 59°48′N 29°42′E
- Petrovskoye, Priozersky District, Leningrad Oblast, a settlement in Petrovskoye Settlement Municipal Formation of Priozersky District; 60°39′N 30°10′E

=== Lipetsk Oblast ===
As of 2012, four rural localities in Lipetsk Oblast bear this name:

- Petrovsky, Lipetsk Oblast, a settlement in Speshnevo-Ivanovsky Selsoviet of Dankovsky District; 53°16′N 38°52′E
- Petrovskoye, Izmalkovsky District, Lipetsk Oblast, a selo in Petrovsky Selsoviet of Izmalkovsky District; 52°38′N 38°4′E
- Petrovskoye, Terbunsky District, Lipetsk Oblast, a village in Soldatsky Selsoviet of Terbunsky District; 52°10′N 38°20′E
- Petrovskoye, Volovsky District, Lipetsk Oblast (or Petrovskaya), a village in Zamaraysky Selsoviet of Volovsky District; 52°7′N 37°49′E

=== Mari El Republic ===
As of 2012, three rural localities in the Mari El Republic bear this name:

- Petrovskoye, Mari-Tureksky District, Mari El Republic, a village under the administrative jurisdiction of Mari-Turek Urban-Type Settlement in Mari-Tureksky District; 56°47′N 49°43′E
- Petrovskoye, Morkinsky District, Mari El Republic, a selo in Semisolinsky Rural Okrug of Morkinsky District; 56°33′N 49°15′E
- Petrovskoye, Yurinsky District, Mari El Republic, a village in Vasilyevsky Rural Okrug of Yurinsky District; 56°34′N 45°41′E

=== Moscow Oblast ===
As of 2012, thirteen rural localities in Moscow Oblast bear this name:

- Petrovskoye, Ivanovskoye Rural Settlement, Istrinsky District, Moscow Oblast (or Petrovskaya), a village in Ivanovskoye Rural Settlement of Istrinsky District; 55°50′N 36°53′E
- Petrovskoye, Snegiri, Istrinsky District, Moscow Oblast, a village under the administrative jurisdiction of Snegiri Suburban Settlement in Istrinsky District; 55°54′N 37°5′E
- Petrovskoye, Klinsky District, Moscow Oblast, a selo in Petrovskoye Rural Settlement of Klinsky District; 56°15′N 36°28′E
- Petrovskoye, Lotoshinsky District, Moscow Oblast (or Petrovskaya), a village in Mikulinskoye Rural Settlement of Lotoshinsky District; 56°19′N 35°30′E
- Petrovskoye, Veselevskoye Rural Settlement, Naro-Fominsky District, Moscow Oblast (or Petrovskaya), a village in Veselevskoye Rural Settlement of Naro-Fominsky District; 55°12′N 36°7′E
- Petrovskoye, Kalininets, Naro-Fominsky District, Moscow Oblast, a selo under the administrative jurisdiction of Kalininets Work Settlement in Naro-Fominsky District; 55°32′N 36°59′E
- Petrovskoye, Kuznetsovskoye Rural Settlement, Ramensky District, Moscow Oblast (or Petrovskaya), a village in Kuznetsovskoye Rural Settlement of Ramensky District; 55°28′N 38°21′E
- Petrovskoye, Sofyinskoye Rural Settlement, Ramensky District, Moscow Oblast, a selo in Sofyinskoye Rural Settlement of Ramensky District; 55°28′N 38°5′E
- Petrovskoye, Serpukhovsky District, Moscow Oblast (or Petrovskaya), a village in Vasilyevskoye Rural Settlement of Serpukhovsky District; 55°1′N 37°27′E
- Petrovskoye, Shatursky District, Moscow Oblast (or Petrovskaya), a selo under the administrative jurisdiction of the Town of Shatura in Shatursky District; 55°35′N 39°28′E
- Petrovskoye, Shchyolkovsky District, Moscow Oblast, a selo in Ogudnevskoye Rural Settlement of Shchyolkovsky District; 56°5′N 38°13′E
- Petrovskoye, Volokolamsky District, Moscow Oblast (or Petrovskaya), a village in Yaropoletskoye Rural Settlement of Volokolamsky District; 56°8′N 35°44′E
- Petrovskoye, Voskresensky District, Moscow Oblast, a selo in Fedinskoye Rural Settlement of Voskresensky District; 55°19′N 38°33′E

=== Nizhny Novgorod Oblast ===
As of 2012, one rural locality in Nizhny Novgorod Oblast bears this name:

- Petrovsky, Nizhny Novgorod Oblast, a settlement in Otarsky Selsoviet of Vorotynsky District; 56°6′N 45°57′E

=== Novgorod Oblast ===
As of 2012, four rural localities in Novgorod Oblast bear this name:

- Petrovskoye, Borovichsky District, Novgorod Oblast, a village in Travkovskoye Settlement of Borovichsky District
- Petrovskoye, Demyansky District, Novgorod Oblast, a village in Zhirkovskoye Settlement of Demyansky District
- Petrovskoye, Lyubytinsky District, Novgorod Oblast, a village under the administrative jurisdiction of Nebolchskoye Settlement in Lyubytinsky District
- Petrovskoye, Pestovsky District, Novgorod Oblast, a village in Bykovskoye Settlement of Pestovsky District

=== Novosibirsk Oblast ===
As of 2012, two rural localities in Novosibirsk Oblast bear this name:

- Petrovsky, Kargatsky District, Novosibirsk Oblast, a settlement in Kargatsky District
- Petrovsky, Ordynsky District, Novosibirsk Oblast, a settlement in Ordynsky District

=== Orenburg Oblast ===
As of 2012, two rural localities in Orenburg Oblast bear this name:

- Petrovskoye, Krasnogvardeysky District, Orenburg Oblast, a selo in Dmitriyevsky Selsoviet of Krasnogvardeysky District
- Petrovskoye, Saraktashsky District, Orenburg Oblast, a selo in Petrovsky Selsoviet of Saraktashsky District

=== Oryol Oblast ===
As of 2012, three rural localities in Oryol Oblast bear this name:

- Petrovsky, Dmitrovsky District, Oryol Oblast, a settlement in Berezovsky Selsoviet of Dmitrovsky District
- Petrovsky, Sverdlovsky District, Oryol Oblast, a settlement in Yakovlevsky Selsoviet of Sverdlovsky District
- Petrovskoye, Oryol Oblast, a village in Cheremoshensky Selsoviet of Mtsensky District

=== Penza Oblast ===
As of 2012, one rural locality in Penza Oblast bears this name:

- Petrovskoye, Penza Oblast, a selo in Vysokinsky Selsoviet of Bashmakovsky District

=== Pskov Oblast ===
As of 2012, four rural localities in Pskov Oblast bear this name:

- Petrovskoye, Loknyansky District, Pskov Oblast, a village in Loknyansky District
- Petrovskoye, Novorzhevsky District, Pskov Oblast, a village in Novorzhevsky District
- Petrovskoye, Pushkinogorsky District, Pskov Oblast, a village in Pushkinogorsky District
- Petrovskaya, Pskov Oblast, a village in Opochetsky District

=== Rostov Oblast ===
As of 2012, seven rural localities in Rostov Oblast bear this name:

- Petrovsky, Azovsky District, Rostov Oblast, a khutor in Kagalnitskoye Rural Settlement of Azovsky District
- Petrovsky, Chertkovsky District, Rostov Oblast, a khutor in Olkhovchanskoye Rural Settlement of Chertkovsky District
- Petrovsky, Krasnosulinsky District, Rostov Oblast, a khutor in Kiselevskoye Rural Settlement of Krasnosulinsky District
- Petrovsky, Millerovsky District, Rostov Oblast, a khutor in Voloshinskoye Rural Settlement of Millerovsky District
- Petrovsky, Milyutinsky District, Rostov Oblast, a khutor in Lukichevskoye Rural Settlement of Milyutinsky District
- Petrovsky, Neklinovsky District, Rostov Oblast, a khutor in Fedorovskoye Rural Settlement of Neklinovsky District
- Petrovsky, Zimovnikovsky District, Rostov Oblast, a khutor in Kuteynikovskoye Rural Settlement of Zimovnikovsky District

=== Ryazan Oblast ===
As of 2012, one rural locality in Ryazan Oblast bears this name:

- Petrovskoye, Ryazan Oblast, a village in Pionersky Rural Okrug of Rybnovsky District

=== Samara Oblast ===
As of 2012, two rural localities in Samara Oblast bear this name:

- Petrovsky, Bogatovsky District, Samara Oblast, a settlement in Bogatovsky District
- Petrovsky, Bolshechernigovsky District, Samara Oblast, a settlement in Bolshechernigovsky District

=== Saratov Oblast ===
As of 2012, two rural localities in Saratov Oblast bear this name:

- Petrovsky, Saratov Oblast, a settlement in Krasnopartizansky District
- Petrovskoye, Saratov Oblast, a selo in Pugachyovsky District

=== Smolensk Oblast ===
As of 2012, four rural localities in Smolensk Oblast bear this name:

- Petrovskoye, Baklanovskoye Rural Settlement, Demidovsky District, Smolensk Oblast, a village in Baklanovskoye Rural Settlement of Demidovsky District
- Petrovskoye, Zakustishchenskoye Rural Settlement, Demidovsky District, Smolensk Oblast, a village in Zakustishchenskoye Rural Settlement of Demidovsky District
- Petrovskoye, Novoduginsky District, Smolensk Oblast, a village in Izvekovskoye Rural Settlement of Novoduginsky District
- Petrovskoye, Roslavlsky District, Smolensk Oblast, a village in Ivanovskoye Rural Settlement of Roslavlsky District

=== Stavropol Krai ===
As of 2012, three rural localities in Stavropol Krai bear this name:

- Petrovsky, Kochubeyevsky District, Stavropol Krai, a khutor in Ivanovsky Selsoviet of Kochubeyevsky District
- Petrovsky, Novoalexandrovsky District, Stavropol Krai, a khutor in Razdolnensky Selsoviet of Novoalexandrovsky District
- Petrovsky, Sovetsky District, Stavropol Krai, a khutor in Soldato-Alexsandrovsky Selsoviet of Sovetsky District

=== Tambov Oblast ===
As of 2015, six rural localities in Tambov Oblast bear this name:

- Petrovskoye, Muchkapsky District, Tambov Oblast, a selo in Krasnokustovsky Selsoviet of Muchkapsky District
- Petrovskoye, Petrovsky District, Tambov Oblast, a selo in Petrovsky Selsoviet of Petrovsky District
- Petrovskoye, Pichayevsky District, Tambov Oblast, a village in Bolshelomovissky Selsoviet of Pichayevsky District
- Petrovskoye, Tokaryovsky District, Tambov Oblast, a village in Chicherinsky Selsoviet of Tokaryovsky District
- Petrovskoye, Zherdevsky District, Tambov Oblast, a selo in Tugolukovsky Selsoviet of Zherdevsky District
- Petrovskaya, Tambov Oblast, a village in Yurlovsky Selsoviet of Nikiforovsky District

=== Republic of Tatarstan ===
As of 2012, two rural localities in the Republic of Tatarstan bear this name:

- Petrovsky, Nurlatsky District, Republic of Tatarstan, a settlement in Nurlatsky District
- Petrovsky, Tyulyachinsky District, Republic of Tatarstan, a settlement in Tyulyachinsky District

=== Tula Oblast ===
As of 2012, nine rural localities in Tula Oblast bear this name:

- Petrovsky, Tula Oblast, a settlement in Inshinsky Rural Okrug of Leninsky District
- Petrovskoye, Luzhenskaya Rural Administration, Chernsky District, Tula Oblast, a village in Luzhenskaya Rural Administration of Chernsky District
- Petrovskoye, Turgenevskaya Rural Administration, Chernsky District, Tula Oblast, a village in Turgenevskaya Rural Administration of Chernsky District
- Petrovskoye, Kimovsky District, Tula Oblast, a village in Lvovsky Rural Okrug of Kimovsky District
- Petrovskoye, Odoyevsky District, Tula Oblast, a selo in Odoyevskaya Rural Administration of Odoyevsky District
- Petrovskoye, Shchyokinsky District, Tula Oblast, a village in Petrovskaya Rural Administration of Shchyokinsky District
- Petrovskoye, Tyoplo-Ogaryovsky District, Tula Oblast, a village in Gorkovsky Rural Okrug of Tyoplo-Ogaryovsky District
- Petrovskoye, Uzlovsky District, Tula Oblast, a village in Akimo-Ilyinskaya Rural Administration of Uzlovsky District
- Petrovskoye, Yefremovsky District, Tula Oblast, a village in Yandovsky Rural Okrug of Yefremovsky District

=== Tver Oblast ===
As of 2012, ten rural localities in Tver Oblast bear this name:

- Petrovskoye, Kalininsky District, Tver Oblast, a selo in Verkhnevolzhskoye Rural Settlement of Kalininsky District
- Petrovskoye, Kesovogorsky District, Tver Oblast, a village in Kesovskoye Rural Settlement of Kesovogorsky District
- Petrovskoye, Kimrsky District, Tver Oblast, a village in Pechetovskoye Rural Settlement of Kimrsky District
- Petrovskoye, Ostashkovsky District, Tver Oblast, a village in Zhdanovskoye Rural Settlement of Ostashkovsky District
- Petrovskoye, Rameshkovsky District, Tver Oblast, a village in Ilgoshchi Rural Settlement of Rameshkovsky District
- Petrovskoye, Bolshemalinskoye Rural Settlement, Sandovsky District, Tver Oblast, a village in Bolshemalinskoye Rural Settlement of Sandovsky District
- Petrovskoye, Lukinskoye Rural Settlement, Sandovsky District, Tver Oblast, a village in Lukinskoye Rural Settlement of Sandovsky District
- Petrovskoye, Sonkovsky District, Tver Oblast, a selo in Petrovskoye Rural Settlement of Sonkovsky District
- Petrovskoye, Vesyegonsky District, Tver Oblast, a village in Proninskoye Rural Settlement of Vesyegonsky District
- Petrovskoye, Zubtsovsky District, Tver Oblast, a village in Pogorelskoye Rural Settlement of Zubtsovsky District

=== Ulyanovsk Oblast ===
As of 2012, one rural locality in Ulyanovsk Oblast bears this name:

- Petrovskoye, Ulyanovsk Oblast, a selo in Bogdashkinsky Rural Okrug of Cherdaklinsky District

=== Vladimir Oblast ===
As of 2012, two rural localities in Vladimir Oblast bear this name:

- Petrovskoye, Kovrovsky District, Vladimir Oblast, a village in Kovrovsky District
- Petrovskoye, Selivanovsky District, Vladimir Oblast, a village in Selivanovsky District

=== Volgograd Oblast ===
As of 2012, one rural locality in Volgograd Oblast bears this name:

- Petrovsky, Volgograd Oblast, a khutor in Petrovsky Selsoviet of Uryupinsky District

=== Vologda Oblast ===
As of 2012, eight rural localities in Vologda Oblast bear this name:

- Petrovskoye, Cherepovetsky District, Vologda Oblast, a village in Ilyinsky Selsoviet of Cherepovetsky District
- Petrovskoye, Talitsky Selsoviet, Kirillovsky District, Vologda Oblast, a selo in Talitsky Selsoviet of Kirillovsky District
- Petrovskoye, Volokoslavinsky Selsoviet, Kirillovsky District, Vologda Oblast, a selo in Volokoslavinsky Selsoviet of Kirillovsky District
- Petrovskoye, Sokolsky District, Vologda Oblast, a village in Dvinitsky Selsoviet of Sokolsky District
- Petrovskoye, Vologodsky District, Vologda Oblast, a village in Spassky Selsoviet of Vologodsky District
- Petrovskaya, Velikoustyugsky District, Vologda Oblast, a village in Yudinsky Selsoviet of Velikoustyugsky District
- Petrovskaya, Verkhovazhsky District, Vologda Oblast, a village in Klimushinsky Selsoviet of Verkhovazhsky District
- Petrovskaya, Vozhegodsky District, Vologda Oblast, a village in Vozhegodsky Selsoviet of Vozhegodsky District

=== Voronezh Oblast ===
As of 2012, four rural localities in Voronezh Oblast bear this name:

- Petrovskoye, Borisoglebsky Urban Okrug, Voronezh Oblast, a selo under the administrative jurisdiction of Borisoglebsky Urban Okrug
- Petrovskoye, Liskinsky District, Voronezh Oblast, a selo in Petrovskoye Rural Settlement of Liskinsky District
- Petrovskoye, Paninsky District, Voronezh Oblast, a selo under the administrative jurisdiction of Pereleshinskoye Urban Settlement in Paninsky District
- Petrovskoye, Ramonsky District, Voronezh Oblast, a settlement in Komsomolskoye Rural Settlement of Ramonsky District

=== Yaroslavl Oblast ===
As of 2012, nine inhabited localities in Yaroslavl Oblast bear this name:

Urban localities

- Petrovskoye, Rostovsky District, Yaroslavl Oblast, a work settlement in Rostovsky District

Rural localities

- Petrovskoye, Bolsheselsky District, Yaroslavl Oblast, a village in Chudinovsky Rural Okrug of Bolsheselsky District
- Petrovskoye, Breytovsky District, Yaroslavl Oblast, a village in Prozorovsky Rural Okrug of Breytovsky District
- Petrovskoye, Danilovsky District, Yaroslavl Oblast, a village in Trofimovsky Rural Okrug of Danilovsky District
- Petrovskoye, Okhotinsky Rural Okrug, Myshkinsky District, Yaroslavl Oblast, a village in Okhotinsky Rural Okrug of Myshkinsky District
- Petrovskoye, Zarubinsky Rural Okrug, Myshkinsky District, Yaroslavl Oblast, a village in Zarubinsky Rural Okrug of Myshkinsky District
- Petrovskoye, Pereslavsky District, Yaroslavl Oblast, a selo in Skoblevsky Rural Okrug of Pereslavsky District
- Petrovskoye, Poshekhonsky District, Yaroslavl Oblast, a village in Krasnovsky Rural Okrug of Poshekhonsky District
- Petrovskoye, Yaroslavsky District, Yaroslavl Oblast, a village in Karabikhsky Rural Okrug of Yaroslavsky District

== Abolished localities ==
- Petrovsky, Pogarsky District, Bryansk Oblast, a khutor in Andreykovichsky Selsoviet of Pogarsky District in Bryansk Oblast; abolished in February 2009
- Petrovskoye, Nizhny Novgorod Oblast, a village in Bolshekuverbsky Selsoviet of Tonshayevsky District in Nizhny Novgorod Oblast; abolished in August 2009
- Petrovskoye (abolished), Tokaryovsky District, Tambov Oblast, a village in Chicherinsky Selsoviet of Tokaryovsky District in Tambov Oblast; merged into the selo of Lvovo in April 2015

== Renamed localities ==
- Petrovskoye, name of Makhachkala, a city in the Republic of Dagestan, from 1844 to 1857
- Petrovskaya, name of Petrovskaya 1-ya, a village in Ichetovkinsky Rural Okrug of Afanasyevsky District in Kirov Oblast, before November 2008; 58°48′N 53°34′E

== Alternative names ==
- Petrovskaya, alternative name of Petrovskaya 1-ya, a village in Ichetovkinsky Rural Okrug of Afanasyevsky District in Kirov Oblast; 58°48′N 53°34′E
- Petrovskaya, alternative name of Bolshoye Petrovskoye, a village in Stremilovskoye Rural Settlement of Chekhovsky District in Moscow Oblast; 55°12′N 37°24′E
- Petrovsky, alternative name of Petrovka, a village in Krasnoorlovskaya Rural Territory of Mariinsky District in Kemerovo Oblast; 56°13′N 87°24′E
- Petrovsky, alternative name of Petrovka, a selo in Breslavsky Selsoviet of Usmansky District in Lipetsk Oblast; 52°13′N 39°59′E
- Petrovskoye, alternative name of Petrovsk, a village in Semyachkovsky Rural Administrative Okrug of Trubchevsky District in Bryansk Oblast; 52°35′N 33°34′E
- Petrovskoye, alternative name of Petrovka, a village in Polovinsky Selsoviet of Polovinsky District in Kurgan Oblast; 54°46′N 65°59′E
- Petrovskoye, alternative name of Bolshoye Petrovskoye, a village in Teryayevskoye Rural Settlement of Volokolamsky District in Moscow Oblast; 56°8′N 36°9′E
- Petrovskoye, alternative name of Petrovka, a selo in Petrovsky Selsoviet of Troitsky District in Altai Krai; 53°4′N 84°39′E
- Petrovskoye, alternative name of Novopetrovka, a selo in Petrovsky Selsoviet of Dobrinsky District in Lipetsk Oblast; 52°12′N 40°39′E
- Petrovskoye, alternative name of Novopetrovskoye, a selo in Novopetrovskoye Rural Settlement of Istrinsky District in Moscow Oblast; 55°59′N 36°29′E
- Petrovskoye, alternative name of Petrovo-Dalneye, a selo in Ilyinskoye Rural Settlement of Krasnogorsky District in Moscow Oblast; 55°45′N 37°10′E
