= List of rural localities in Tambov Oblast =

Map of Russia with Tambov Oblast highlighted

This is a list of rural localities in Tambov Oblast. Tambov Oblast (Russian: Тамбо́вская о́бласть, Tambovskaya oblast) is a federal subject of Russia (an oblast). Its administrative center is the city of Tambov. As of the 2010 Census, its population was 1,091,994.

== Locations ==
- Alexandrovka
- Bondari
- Bukari
- Donskoye
- Fonovka
- Gavrilovka 2-ya
- Glazok
- Inokovka
- Kotovskoye
- Lavrovo
- Lvovo
- Mozdok
- Petrovskoye
- Pichayevo
- Sampur
- Satinka
- Satino
- Shapkino
- Staroyuryevo
- Usovo

== See also ==
- Lists of rural localities in Russia
