= Shapkino =

Shapkino (Russian: Шапкино) may refer to the following places in Russia:

- Shapkino, Mozhaysky District, Moscow Oblast
- Shapkino, Tambov Oblast
- Shapkino, Vologda Oblast
