= Mozdok (inhabited locality) =

Mozdok (Russian: Моздок) is the name of several inhabited localities in Russia.

Urban localities

- Mozdok, a town in Mozdoksky District of the Republic of North Ossetia-Alania

Rural localities

- Mozdok, Kursk Oblast, a khutor in Kitayevsky Selsoviet of Medvensky District of Kursk Oblast
- Mozdok, Tambov Oblast, a village in Berezovsky Selsoviet of Uvarovsky District of Tambov Oblast
