= Bondari =

Bondari (Russian: Бондари) is the name of several rural localities in Russia:

- Bondari, Pskovsky District, Pskov Oblast, a village in Pskovsky District of Pskov Oblast
- Bondari, Sebezhsky District, Pskov Oblast, a village in Sebezhsky District of Pskov Oblast
- Bondari, Tambov Oblast, a selo in Bondarsky Selsoviet of Bondarsky District in Tambov Oblast
