= Lavrovo =

Lavrovo (Russian: Лаврово) is the name of several rural localities in Russia:

- Lavrovo, Tambov Oblast, a selo in Mordovsky District of Tambov Oblast
- Lavrovo, Tomsk Oblast, a village in Tomsky District of Tomsk Oblast
- Lavrovo, Kesovogorsky District, Tver Oblast, a village in Kesovogorsky District of Tver Oblast
- Lavrovo, Oleninsky District, Tver Oblast, a village in Oleninsky District of Tver Oblast
- Lavrovo, Penovsky District, Tver Oblast, a village in Penovsky District of Tver Oblast
- Lavrovo, Rameshkovsky District, Tver Oblast, a village in Rameshkovsky District of Tver Oblast
- Lavrovo, Sonkovsky District, Tver Oblast, a selo in Sonkovsky District of Tver Oblast
- Lavrovo, Torzhoksky District, Tver Oblast, a village in Torzhoksky District of Tver Oblast
- Lavrovo, Vyshnevolotsky District, Tver Oblast, a village in Vyshnevolotsky District of Tver Oblast
- Lavrovo, Zapadnodvinsky District, Tver Oblast, a village in Zapadnodvinsky District of Tver Oblast

== See also ==
- Lavrov
