= Staroyuryevsky District =

Staroyuryevsky District Староюрьевский район (Russian)
- District
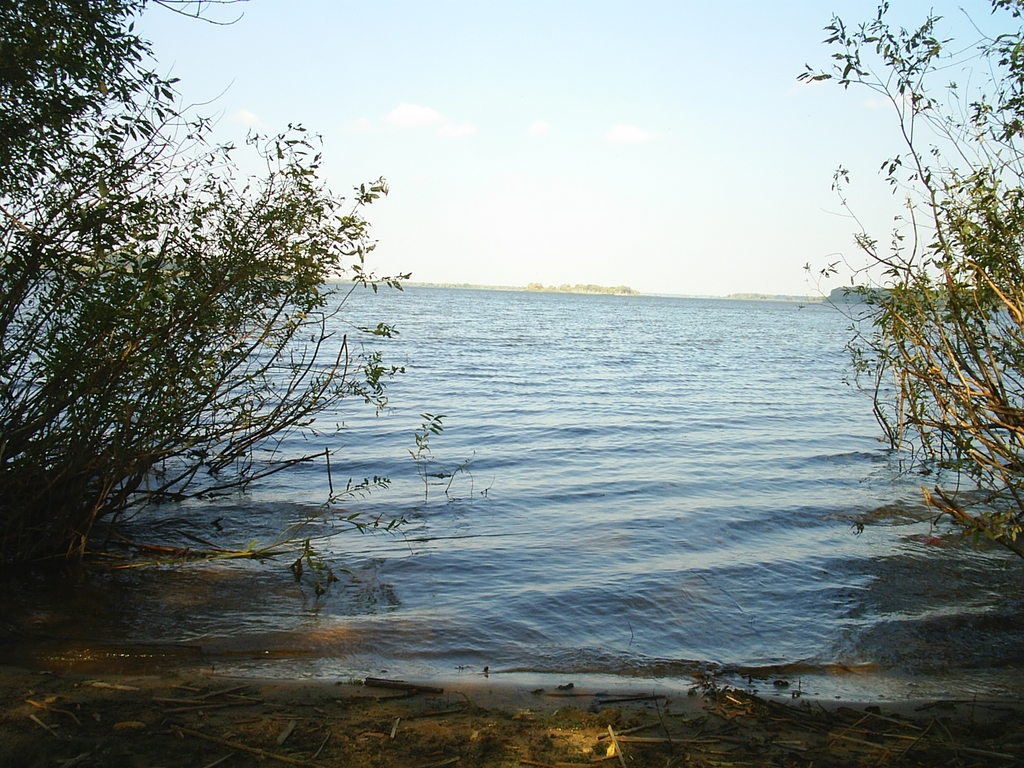
- Lake in Staroyuryevsky District

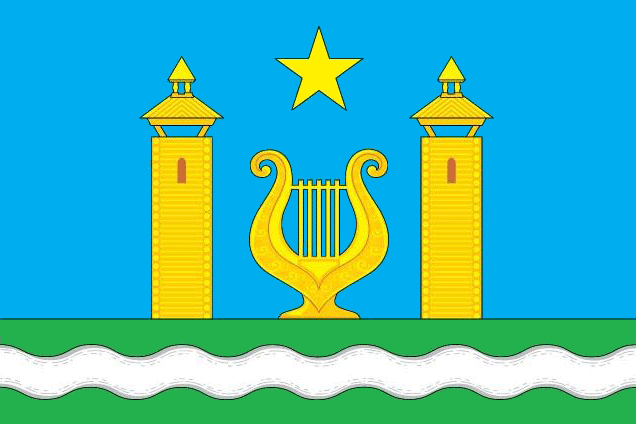
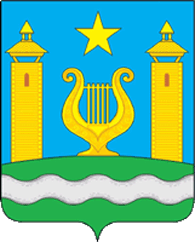
- Flag Coat of arms
- Location of Staroyuryevsky District in Tambov Oblast
- Coordinates: 53°19′10″N 40°42′30″E
- Country: Russia
- Federal subject: Tambov Oblast
- Established: 1928
- Administrative center: Staroyuryevo

Area Sarayevsky (Ryazan Ob) Sosnovsky Michurinsky Pervomaysky
  - Total: 1,008 km^{2} (389 sq mi)

Population (2010 Census)
  - Total: 14,553
  - Density: 14.44/km^{2} (37.39/sq mi)
  - Urban: 0%
  - Rural: 100%

Administrative structure
  - Administrative divisions: 9 selsoviet
  - Inhabited localities: 49 rural localities

Municipal structure
  - Municipally incorporated as: Staroyuryevsky Municipal District
  - Municipal divisions: 0 urban settlements, 9 rural settlements
- Time zone: UTC+3 (MSK)
- OKTMO ID: 68636000
- Website: http://r43.tambov.gov.ru/

Staroyuryevsky District (Russian: Старою́рьевский райо́н) is an administrative and municipal district (raion), one of the twenty-three in Tambov Oblast, Russia. It is located in the northwest of the oblast. The district borders with Sarayevsky District of Ryazan Oblast in the north, Sosnovsky District in the east, Michurinsky District in the south, and with Pervomaysky District in the west. The area of the district is 1,008 square kilometers (389 sq mi). Its administrative center is the rural locality (a selo) of Staroyuryevo. Population: 14,553 (2010 Census); 17,695 (2002 census); 21,852 (1989 Soviet census). The population of Staroyuryevo accounts for 42.2% of the district's total population.
