= Tambov Rebellion =

1920–1922 peasant revolt in the Russian Civil War

- Part of the Russian Civil War
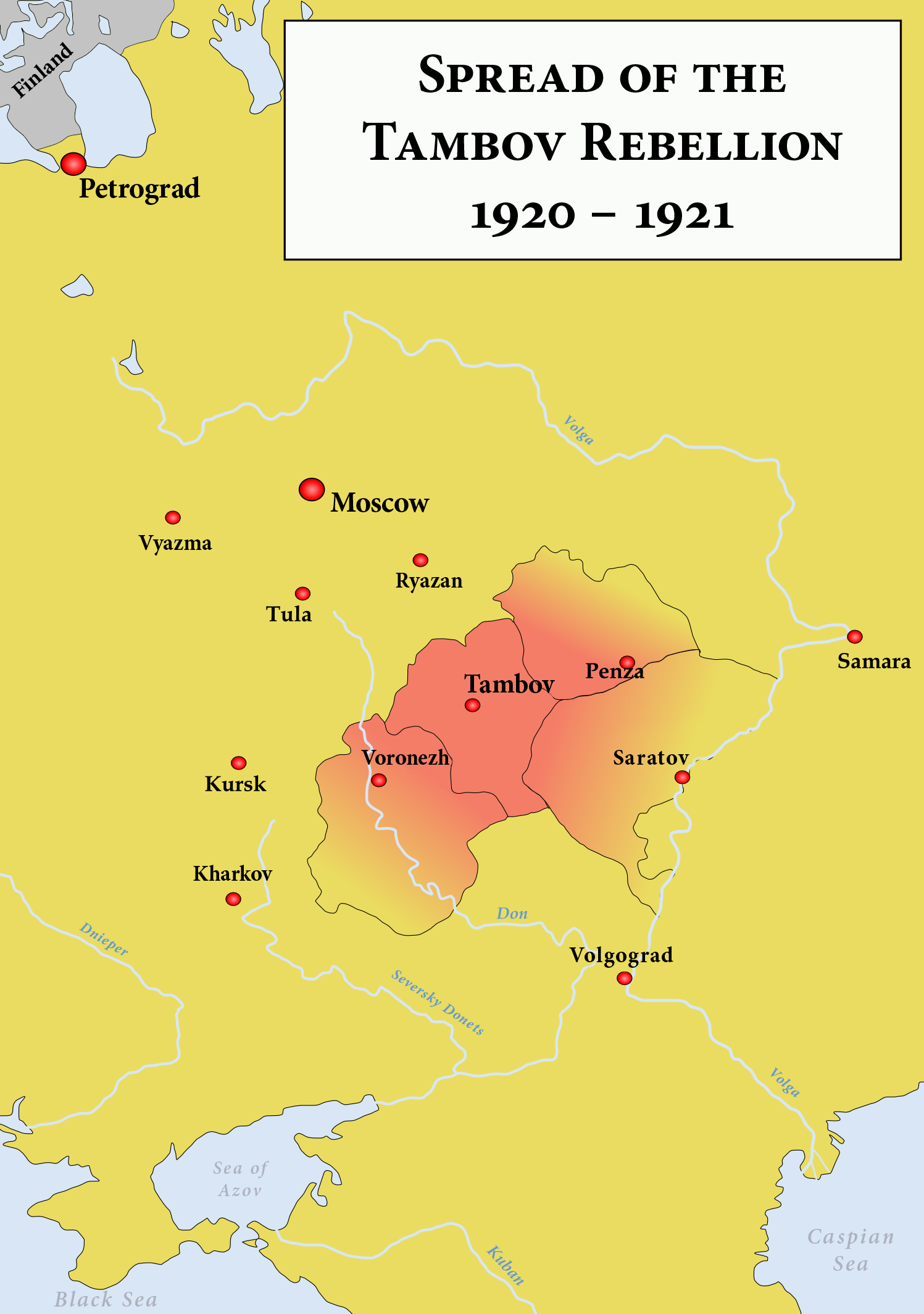
Date	19 August 1920 – mid 1922
Location	Tambov Governorate, Russian SFSR 52.5°N 41.8°E
Result	Bolshevik victory

Belligerents
Green armies: (Russia) Republic of the Tambov Partisan Region	(Russian Soviet Federative Socialist Republic) Soviet Russia

Commanders and leaders
(Russia) Alexander Antonov † (Russia) Peter Tokmakov † (Russia) Ivan Ishin (executed)	(Russian Soviet Federative Socialist Republic) Mikhail Tukhachevsky (Russian Soviet Federative Socialist Republic) V. Antonov-Ovseyenko (Russian Soviet Federative Socialist Republic) Alexander Schlichter (Russian Soviet Federative Socialist Republic) Ieronim Uborevich (Russian Soviet Federative Socialist Republic) Grigory Kotovsky (Russian Soviet Federative Socialist Republic) Sergey Kamenev

Strength
Probably 20,000 regular and 20,000 militiamen 14,000 (August 1920); 50,000 (October 1920); 40,000 – 70,000 (February 1921); 1,000 (September 1921)	5,000 (November 1920); 50,000 – 100,000 (March 1921)

Casualties and losses
- 50,000 civilians interned in camps 15,000 dead

The Tambov Rebellion of 1920–1922 was one of the largest and best-organized peasant rebellions challenging the Bolshevik government during the Russian Civil War. The uprising took place in the territories of the modern Tambov Oblast and part of the Voronezh Oblast, less than 500 kilometres (300 mi) southeast of Moscow.

In Soviet historiography, the rebellion was referred to as the Antonovschina ("Antonov's mutiny"), so named after Alexander Antonov, a former official of the Socialist Revolutionary Party, who opposed the government of the Bolsheviks. It began in August 1920 with resistance to the forced confiscation of grain and developed into a guerrilla war against the Red Army, Cheka units and the Soviet Russian authorities. The bulk of the peasant army was destroyed by large Red Army reinforcements using chemical weapons in the summer of 1921; smaller groups continued resistance until the following year. It is estimated that around 100,000 people were arrested and around 15,000 killed during the suppression of the uprising.

The movement was later portrayed by the Soviets as anarchical banditry, similar to other left-wing anti-Bolshevik movements that opposed them during this period.

== Background ==
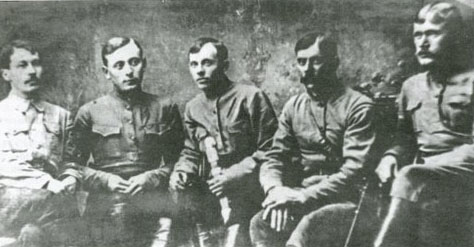
Alexander Antonov (centre) and his staff

In 1904, Alexander Antonov was sentenced to twenty years in prison for blowing up a train, but received an amnesty from the Russian Provisional Government following the February Revolution and returned to his native Tambov, where he served in the local militia in Kirsanov. As the Provisional Government refused to discuss agrarian reform, he joined the Left Socialist-Revolutionaries.

The peasants of Tambov largely supported the October Revolution, since Vladimir Lenin's Decree on Land legalized the expropriation of property. Nevertheless, the Bolsheviks had problems in maintaining control of the governorate. Unlike in the cities, the Bolsheviks had hardly any supporters in the rural regions, where in the elections of 1917 the Socialist Revolutionary Party had won large majorities. In March 1918, the Bolshevik delegates in Tambov were even thrown out of the local soviets, following the ratification of the Treaty of Brest-Litovsk.

Following the outbreak of the Russian Civil War, the newly established Russian Soviet Republic adopted the policy of war communism, in which food for the cities was obtained by compulsory requisition from the villages, without financial compensation. This was met with the resistance of the peasant population, especially as the requisitions were often violent in nature. Likewise, the amount of grain to be requisitioned were not measured according to production. Instead, commissions gave a rough estimate based on pre-war production, so that devastation, crop failures, and population decline were not included. Before the revolution, the peasants in Tambov produced around one million tonnes of grain. Of these, one-third was exported. On the basis of these figures, which did not include the dislocations of the civil war in the countryside, a high target for the procurement of grain was set. The peasants often responded by reducing their acreage, as they no longer had the economic incentive to produce surpluses, which made the confiscations ordered from above hit them even harder.

For the most part, the peasants had been indifferent to Bolshevik ideology, but they came to hate the Bolsheviks for their forced requisitions, which had put them at the limit of survival, and for the forced levies that had created numerous fugitives. In the summer of 1919, Antonov fled to the forest and formed a gang that murdered several Bolshevik activists. This is how the first anti-Bolshevik guerrilla movements arose, made up of Red Army deserters, Socialist-Revolutionaries and peasants who resisted the searches in the forests. Their first acts were assassinating unpopular state officials and raiding state farms. They killed more than 200 government grain collectors and over the next year their forces grew steadily, growing from an initial 150 to 6,000 by early summer 1920, but that would have to wait until after the defeat of Anton Denikin's White movement for there to be a real mass uprising. The other leaders of this force were Alexander Antonov's younger brother, Dmitri Antonov, and the SR Peter Tokmakov.

== Outbreak ==
On 19 August 1920, a revolt broke out in the small town of Khitrovo, where a military requisitioning detachment of the Red Army had appropriated everything they could and "beat up elderly men of seventy in full view of the public". In anticipation of an attack by the Red Army to enforce the procurement of grain, the farmers of the village armed themselves. Since only a few rifles were available, this was partly done with pitchforks and clubs. Other villages soon joined in the uprising against the Soviet authorities, and succeeded in repelling the Red Army.

The peasants rebels, after their first success, attempted to capture Tambov, the capital of the governorate. There, however, they were scattered by Red machine guns barely ten kilometers from their target. It was here that Alexander Antonov, a radical Left Socialist-Revolutionary, led the movement into a guerilla war against the Reds. Before the uprising, Antonov and a few comrades had fought an underground insurrection against the Bolsheviks and had been sentenced to death. Since he was able to escape capture by the Soviet authorities, he was a kind of folk hero to the peasants. He demanded that the free trade and movement of goods should be allowed, that the grain requisitions should be ended and the Soviet administration and the Cheka dissolved. His troops carried out surprise raids on railway junctions, kolkhoz and the Soviet authorities. They were supported by the population and used the villages for cover and rest. Likewise, they often disguised themselves as Red Army soldiers to move about the countryside or to exaggerate the element of surprise.

The insurgent peasants organized themselves through the Union of Working Peasants (Russian: Союз Трудовых Крестьян, STK), which functioned as the political organization of the insurgents and with which Antonov worked. Having their own political program gave them a strength and coherence that other peasant uprisings lacked. However, this movement was still based on the weariness of the population but without having a clear idea of how to replace the government. Instead, Antonov dreamed of marching on Moscow and ending Bolshevik rule. In May 1921, the Union proclaimed the Provisional Democratic Republic of the Tambov Partisan Region which would rule until the holding of a democratically elected constituent assembly. The Republic used the pre-revolutionary flag of Russia, and the slogan "Long live the Great United and Indivisible Russia", one of the slogans of the White movement, became one of the mottos of the rebels and the Republic.

Antonov organized the farmers on the model of the Red Army in 18–20 regiments with their own political commissars, reconnaissance departments and communication departments. Likewise, he introduced a strict discipline. The farmers used the Red flag as their standard and thus claimed the central symbol of the revolution. They had 14,000 or 18,000 men, mostly consisting of deserters from the Red Army. Of these, five to seven thousand had firearms. By the end of the month, the rebels numbered six groups, each totaling 4,000 men with a dozen machine guns and several artillery pieces. As the Bolshevik authorities were busy with the Polish-Soviet War and Pyotr Wrangel's offensive in northern Tavria, they only had 3,000 unreliable troops in Tambov province. These soldiers had been drafted from the local villages and often had little motivation to fight members of their own class.

The rebels were able to control large parts of the region and managed to capture railway trains transporting requisitioned grain. The grain intended to supply Red Army units was instead re-distributed by Antonov's men to local farmers. The rebellion also spread to parts of other provinces: Voronezh, Saratov and Penza. This territory was populated by more than three million people, 90% farmers and artisans. The region was densely populated, with rich, forested land that offered many jobs, especially as the land had been appropriated in 1917 and the owners expelled. But the demands of the Bolshevik government and the Russian Civil War prevented them from profiting, which only encouraged the insurrection.

In the areas controlled by the rebels, all Soviet institutions were abolished. Around 1,000 members of the Russian Communist Party were killed by the insurgents. By October 1920, the Bolsheviks had completely lost control of the rural territory of the governorate, dominating only the city of Tambov itself and a number of smaller urban settlements. After numerous deserters from the Red Army joined it, the peasant army numbered over 50,000 fighters. The rebel militia proved highly effective and even infiltrated the Tambov Cheka.

Towards the end of October, the head of the Internal Guard in the Tambov Governorate, Vasili Kornev, engaged in a series of battles with the rebels. According to his letters, he killed 3,000, wounded 300, and captured 1,000 along with copious amounts of weapons, ammunition, and supplies (such as a telephone and a field kitchen). His casualties were 90 dead and less than 200 wounded. However, he was blamed for the rebellion and removed. Some sources say the rebels numbered just 8,000 horsemen in November.

== Climax of the rebellion ==
On 5 November, two to six thousand rebels, mostly on horseback, attacked the railway station at Sampur in two coordinated groups, capturing an artillery cannon, some machine guns, and numerous revolvers and rifles. However, they failed in their attempt to sabotage the railway lines and quickly withdrew. At the time, Bolshevik reports said that two thousand partisans were still in the woods of Novokhopyorsk, near the station. The main source of information that the peasants had about what happened on other fronts were the red prisoners. In that month, there were barely 5,000 Bolsheviks in the region.

At the height of his power, thanks to their strong popular support, between October 1920 and January 1921, the rebels mobilized 50,000 partisans. By February 1921, they were between 20,000 and 40,000-strong, with half of them acting as full-time combatants and the other half part-time. Around 6,000 were mounted, hindering the government troops, whose lack of mobility undermined their effectiveness.

But they never formed an "organized guerrilla army". Because of this, most of their actions were impulsive assaults orchestrated by each band against the Bolshevik detachments in charge of requisitioning grain or repressing the villagers. This lack of coordination was, in addition to their poor weapons and training, ultimately decisive in their defeat.

They were organized in two armies divided into a total of 21 regiments. Their use of guerrilla warfare was based on the old tactic of launching surprise attacks and fleeing immediately afterwards, thanks to their superior knowledge of the terrain and the mobility of their cavalry. Each village was in charge of equipping and maintaining a group of these combatants, which was easy since many were locals defending their own communities. However, that localism was also played a disadvantage. Being closed in on themselves prevented them from seeking allies in other peasant movements or marching against larger urban centres, the control of which was what the Bolsheviks worried about since their source of support was the industrial proletariat.

By the end of the year the rebellion had achieved one of its main objectives as the reds had stopped sending units to their territories to requisition grain. The officials in the south of Tambov were incapable of such action as their resources were sufficient only to garrison the villages under their control. But the north was at peace as, not being a large food-producing region, it never lived through the requisitions that had sparked the revolt. The lack of heavy weapons prevented the rebels from taking over the cities, which became havens for communists and government officials. During that December, reinforcements from the Cheka began to arrive, numbering 3,500 combatants. Two months later its leader, Felix Dzerzhinski, would arrive to direct its operations.

During this time, garrison officers and local Bolshevik militants complained of their increasing abandonment by Moscow, from where ever fewer supplies and reinforcements were sent to them. In fact, the Red military command had decided to concentrate on a great campaign of pacification of Tambov: as soon as their troops flooded the province, the movement would be finished. In addition, it was increasingly difficult to help them because their main communication links, the armored trains, were continuously attacked in the area. During the winter of 1920–1921, food reserves in many towns were exhausted, as in Kozlov and Morshansk, towns located on the edge of the rebel zone and whose communist garrison saw most of its inhabitants leave or turn to the black market to survive.

On 23 January 1921, 250 mounted cadets of the 6th Volche-Karachan regiment managed to defend the town of Borisoglebsk from a large rebel contingent. For the Bolsheviks, it was key to keep Borisoglebsk and Kirsanov in their hands, since these were their bastions in the middle of the area controlled by the rebels. During that month, the Bolshevik authorities demobilized 4,000 locals who served in their garrisons because they were not trusted. They immediately joined the partisans.

By this time, only half of the desired grain had been collected by the Bolshevik requisition squads. Antonov-Ovseyenko noticed from his own experience that every other farmer in Tambov was starving. To win over the population, Nikolai Bukharin was commissioned to draw up "non-coercive measures", in which he recommended that the required grain quotas be lowered. In response, on 2 February 1921, the Soviet leadership announced the end of the "prodrazvyorstka", and issued a special decree directed at peasants from the region implementing the "prodnalog" policy. The new policy was essentially a tax on grain and other foodstuffs. This was done before the 10th Congress of the Bolsheviks, when the measure was officially adopted. The announcement began circulating in the Tambov area on 9 February 1921.

On 20 March, a general amnesty was also announced for anyone who surrendered. During the two weeks that the amnesty was in place, about 3,000 rebels capitulated, but very few with weapon in hand. By then, Bolshevik power had disappeared almost entirely from the region despite having 32,500 foot soldiers and 8,000 cavalry plus machine guns and cannons in the area.

By this time, the rebels were able to mobilize large field armies. On 11 April, Antonov gathered 5,000 partisans and launched a pincer attack on Rasskazovo (an hour prior he launched a diversionary attack on Nizhne-Spasskoe with a small force). The garrison consisted of a company of infantrymen, a unit of Bolshevik militants, a machine gun platoon, the Volga Infantry Brigade (which had arrived in January from Saratov), and the 2nd Cheka regiment, and it quickly collapsed. The rebels' goal was achieved: an artillery cannon with two or three hundred rounds, eleven machine guns, four hundred rifles, one hundred thousand ammunition, eighty telephones and 50 versts of cable. On 24 April, they gathered in the village of Kobiaki five to ten thousand fighters under the command of "Vaska Karas" (identified as Vasili Nikitin-Koroliov) and Vasili F. Selianski. Not everyone participated in the battle. They intended to take the town of Kirsanov, garrisoned by a Moscow infantry brigade led by cavalry commander V. I. Dmitrenko. A day later the rebels launched two unsuccessful assaults, abandoning 22 machine guns, small arms and ammunition to the Red victors. Pursued by the Red cavalry, the rebels had 2,000 dead in the following days according to estimates by the communist government.

== Suppression ==
By January 1921, peasant revolts had spread to Samara, Saratov, Tsaritsyn, Astrakhan and Siberia. However, with the end of the Polish–Soviet War and the defeat of General Wrangel, the Red Army could divert its regular troops to the area. In May 1921, Mikhail Tukhachevsky was ordered by Lenin as military commander-in-chief to suppress the uprising in Tambov. Assigned to him were tanks, heavy artillery and 100,000 soldiers, mostly special units of the Cheka, with additional Red Army units. As many members as possible of the communist youth organization Komsomol were assigned to him because they were considered politically loyal. The Red Army used armoured trains and engaged in the summary execution of civilians. The rebels responded with assassination attempts on Tukhachevsky and Ovseyenko, and the kidnapping and shooting of family members of members of the Party and Red Army.

On 6 May, Tukhachevsky announced his pacification campaign. That month a large army of between 50,000 and 100,000 Red soldiers reached the southern part of the oblast. The plan was to "flood the rebellion area with troops". They included regular forces, Chinese and Hungarian internationalists and detachments of the Cheka, the Units for Special Purposes and the Militarised Guard, although the decisive contingents were the numerous cadets and horsemen who arrived. They were supported by 70 heavy artillery pieces, hundreds of machine guns, 3 armored units, a plane, armored trains and chemical weapons left over from World War I stockpiles.

On 31 May, seven armored vehicles commanded by General Ivan Fedko surprised 3,000 rebels in the village of Dve Sestritsy and dispersed them with heavy casualties. Two infantry brigades and one veteran cavalry brigade under General Grigori Kotovski were assigned to the Tambov sector. During the first two weeks of May, 15,000 Red Army officers concentrated in Tambov to prepare for the campaign. On the dawn of 1 June, Fedko with three vehicles armed with machine guns, Kotovski's horsemen and the brigade of Siberian cavalry of M. D. Kovalev launched a surprise attack against Antonov and the 3,000 partisans with whom he occupied Elan. Although the rebels managed to repulse the armored vehicles with their rifles, they fled before Kovalyov's cavalry. On 6 June, the armored vehicles commanded by Fedko achieved another victory near Chernyshovo. Between 1 and 9 June, three Bolshevik forces led by Uborevich launched a coordinated attack with seven armored vehicles against the rebel stronghold, near the town of Kamenka, and faced 2,000 rebels led by Antonov and Boguslavski in six battles, during which 800 partisans died. The region between Tambov and Kirsanov was pacified. These three forces intended to converge on Rzhaksa: Dmitrenko's cavalry brigade (2,000 men from the Sampur in the Tambov uyezd), Kotovski's cavalry brigade (1,000 soldiers from the Lomovis station in the Kirsanov uyezd) and the 14th cavalry brigade (1,000 cavalry up the Vorona River from Karai-Pushkino in Kirsanov's uyezd). Two weeks later rebel commander Aleksandr Boguslavski was killed in combat. The same fate befell Tokmakov, Karas and Selianski.

On 12 June 1921, Tukhachevsky received permission from Vladimir Antonov-Ovseenko to use chemical weapons against the remaining rebels. They ordered their troops to clear the forests with poison gas, stipulating that it "must be carefully calculated, so that the layer of gas penetrates the forests and kills everyone hiding there." Publications in local Communist newspapers openly glorified liquidations of "bandits" with the poison gas. Antonov's army was encircled and destroyed, leaving the rebellion practically defeated by the end of June. By the month of September, the rebels had been reduced to a thousand due to the massive arrival of red troops. By the end of that year, there were no more than 4,000 rebels left on the warpath. With almost all their leaders dead, the last parties took refuge in swamps and forests under constant persecution.

It took until the middle of 1922 for the province to be pacified completely. The Antonov brothers and several of their last followers were killed in combat against a Red detachment on 24 June 1922 in the village of Nizhni Shibriai, where they hid their few personal possessions. The Cheka wanted to arrest them and set fire to the house where they took refuge. When they tried to flee, they were shot down. By then, their movement was reduced to only a few groups.

== Consequences ==
As a result of the military operations against the rebels, around 6,000 of their fighters surrendered and were either shot or deported. The deportees were transferred from the local camps to special camps in the northern regions of Russia after the suppression of the uprising. These camps were otherwise reserved for officers of the White movement and captured insurgents from Kronstadt. In these camps there was a particularly high mortality of prisoners compared to the rest of the camp system. The devastation of the fighting and punitive measures, together with the Bolshevik agricultural policy, led to a famine in the areas of the insurgents. In addition to Tambov, large parts of Russia were affected in the following two years.

Family members of the rebels were usually used as hostages, others were held at random and in some cases entire villages were interned. Between 50,000 and 100,000 villagers including some 1,000 children, were interned in dedicated concentration camps in July 1921. There they suffered severely from cholera and typhus epidemics. The death rate is estimated to be around 15–20% per month for the fall of 1921. Relatively few were released or executed, "barely" 15,000 were shot. However, mass executions of suspected villagers and prisoners were frequent in the villages.

Some villages were burned to the ground. The properties confiscated from the arrested and exiled families were given to supporters or collaborators of the regime. The activities of the Cheka, the incorporation of thousands of locals into the Communist Party (with the benefits that it implied) and the concessions of the New Economic Policy helped the Bolsheviks in the spring of 1921 to defuse the situation, especially the end of grain requisitions.

The uprising made the Soviet leadership aware of its failure to manage relations with the peasants and is seen as one of the factors that prompted Lenin to initiate the New Economic Policy. The Russian sociologist and contemporary witness Pitirim Sorokin even concluded that the insurgents had forced the NEP by their actions. The new policy relied more on a natural tax on actual production instead of on compulsory collection of agricultural products. In the military field it is mentioned that the Soviet Army Commander Mikhail Frunze was impressed by the guerillas' resistance to regular forces. He therefore began studying guerrilla tactics as a commander in the Red Army. This is regarded as a precondition of the Soviet partisans' strategy in their World War II campaign against the Nazi invasion.

== Union of Working Peasants ==
The Union of Working Peasants (Russian: Союз трудового крестьянства) was a local political organization that emerged from the rebellion in 1920. The organization was led by the former Social-Revolutionary politician Aleksandr Antonov. The goal of the organization was the 'overthrow of the government of Communist-Bolsheviks'.

In December 1920, the Union of Working Peasants released a manifesto, stating their intention to overthrow the Bolshevik government and their aims in doing so:

# Political equality for all citizens, without division into classes.

1. An end to the civil war and a return to civilian life.
2. Every effort to be made to ensure a lasting peace with all foreign states.
3. The convocation of a Constituent Assembly on the basis of equal, universal, direct and secret suffrage, without predetermining its choice of political system, and preserving the voters' right to recall deputies who do not carry out the people's will.
4. Prior to the convocation of the Constituent Assembly, the establishment of provisional authorities in the localities and the centre, on an elective basis, by those unions and parties which have taken part in the struggle against the communists.
5. Freedom of speech, the press, conscience, unions and assembly.
6. The full implementation of the law on the socialisation of the land, adopted and confirmed by the former Constituent Assembly.
7. The supply of basic necessities, particularly food, to the inhabitants of the towns and countryside through the cooperatives.
8. Regulation of the prices of labour and the output of factories run by the state.
9. Partial denationalisation of factories; heavy industry, coal mining and metallurgy should remain in state hands.
10. Workers' control and state supervision of production.
11. The opportunity for both Russian and foreign capital to restore the country's economic life.
12. The immediate restoration of political, trade and economic relations with foreign powers.
13. Free self-determination for the nationalities inhabiting the former Russian empire.
14. The initiation of wide-ranging state credit for restoring small-scale agriculture.
15. Freedom for handicraft production.
16. Unfettered teaching in schools and compulsory universal literacy education.
17. The volunteer partisan units currently organised and operating must not be disbanded until the Constituent Assembly has been convened and it has resolved the question of a standing army.

== In popular culture ==
- Some scenes of the rebellion are depicted in 2011 movie Once Upon a Time There Lived a Simple Woman by Andrei Smirnov.
- Apricot Jam and Other Stories (2010) by Aleksandr Solzhenitsyn. In a short story about Marshal Georgy Zhukov's futile attempts at writing his memoirs, the retired Marshal reminisces about being a young officer fighting against the Union of Working Peasants. He recalls Mikhail Tukhachevsky's arrival to take command of the campaign and his first address to his men. He announced that total war and scorched earth tactics are to be used against civilians who assist or even sympathize with the Union. Zhukov recalls how Tukhachevsky's tactics were adopted and succeeded in breaking the uprising. In the process, however, they virtually depopulated the surrounding countryside.

== See also ==
- Bibliography of the Russian Revolution and Civil War
- Outline of the Russian Revolution and Civil War
- Index of articles related to the Russian Revolution and Civil War
- The "Russian" Civil Wars, 1916–1926: Ten Years That Shook the World
- Russia in Flames: War, Revolution, Civil War, 1914–1921
- Russia in Revolution: An Empire in Crisis, 1890 to 1928
- Russia: Revolution and Civil War, 1917—1921
- The Russian Revolution: A New History
- Kronstadt rebellion
- Left-wing uprisings against the Bolsheviks
- West Siberian rebellion
- Peasant rebellion of Sorokino

== Bibliography ==
- Avrich, Paul (2014). Kronstadt, 1921. Princeton: Princeton University Press. ISBN 978-1-4008-5908-5.
- Blunsom, E.O. (2013). The Past And Future Of Law. Bloomington: Xlibris. ISBN 978-1-4628-7514-6.
- Bookchin, Murray (2004). The Third Revolution: Popular Movements in the Revolutionary Era. Vol. III. New York: A&C Black. ISBN 978-0-82645-054-8. Archived from the original on 2023-05-07.
- Chamberlin, William Henry (1965). The Russian revolution, 1918–1921: from the civil war to the consolidation of power. Grosset & Dunlap. OCLC 614679071.
- Conquest, Robert (1986). "Revolution, Peasant War and Famine". The Harvest of Sorrow. Oxford University Press. ISBN 978-0-19-505180-3.
- Conquest, Robert (1987). The Harvest of Sorrow: Soviet Collectivization and the Terror-famine. New York: Oxford University Press. ISBN 978-0-19-505180-3. OCLC 1023952466.
- Figes, Orlando (1997). A People's Tragedy. New York: Viking Press. pp. 753–769. ISBN 0670859168.
- Figes, Orlando (2010). Crimea: The Last Crusade. London: Allen Lane. ISBN 978-0-7139-9704-0.
- Hosking, Geoffrey A. (1993). The First Socialist Society: A History of the Soviet Union from Within. Harvard University Press. ISBN 978-0-674-30443-7. Archived from the original on 2023-04-11.
- Khvostov, Mikhail (1997). The Russian Civil War. Vol. 2: White Armies. London: Osprey Publishing. ISBN 978-1-85532-656-9. OCLC 41338328.
- Landis, Erik C. (2008). Bandits and Partisans: The Antonov Movement in the Russian Civil War. Russian and East European studies. University of Pittsburgh Press. ISBN 978-0822971177.
- Leggett, George (1981). The Cheka: Lenin's political police. Clarendon Press. ISBN 978-0198225522. OCLC 432436617.
- Mayer, Arno J. (2002). The Furies: Violence and Terror in the French and Russian Revolutions. Princeton University Press. ISBN 978-0-691-09015-3. Archived from the original on 2023-02-04.
- Pipes, Richard (1993). Russia Under the Bolshevik Regime. New York: Alfred Knopf.
- Pipes, Richard (2011). Russia Under the Bolshevik Regime. Knopf Doubleday Publishing Group. ISBN 978-0-307-78861-0.
- Powell, Jim (2007) [2005]. Wilson's War: How Woodrow Wilson's Great Blunder Led to Hitler, Lenin, Stalin, and World War II. New York: Random House. ISBN 978-0-307-42271-2. Archived from the original on 2023-05-13.
- Scheibert, Peter (1984). Lenin an der Macht – Das russische Volk in der Revolution 1918–1922 [Lenin in power – the Russian people in the revolution of 1918–1922] (in German). Weinheim: Akad.-Verl. pp. 389–393. ISBN 3527175032. OCLC 1031792314.
- Waller, Sally (2012). History for the IB Diploma: Imperial Russia, Revolutions and the Emergence of the Soviet State 1853–1924. Cambridge: Cambridge University Press. ISBN 978-1-107-68489-8.
- Werth, Nicolas (1998). "A State against Its People: Violence, Repression, and Terror in the Soviet Union". The Black Book of Communism: Crimes, Terror, Repression. Harvard University Press. pp. 33–268. ISBN 978-0-674-07608-2.
- Werth, Nicolas (1999). "1. A State against its People: violence, repression, and terror in the Soviet Union". In Stéphane Courtois (ed.). The Black Book of Communism. Cambridge: Harvard University Press. ISBN 978-0-674-07608-2. OCLC 949773841.
