= Satino =

Satino may refer to:

- Satino, Tambov Oblast, a village (selo) in Tambov Oblast, Russia
- Satino, Tver Oblast, a village in Tver Oblast, Russia
- Satino, name of several other rural localities in Russia
