= Satinka =

Satinka (Russian: Сатинка) is the name of several rural localities in Russia:

- Satinka, Tambov Oblast, a settlement in Satinsky Selsoviet of Sampursky District of Tambov Oblast
- Satinka, Berezovsky Rural Okrug, Kireyevsky District, Tula Oblast, a village in Berezovsky Rural Okrug of Kireyevsky District of Tula Oblast
- Satinka, Bogucharovsky Rural Okrug, Kireyevsky District, Tula Oblast, a selo in Bogucharovsky Rural Okrug of Kireyevsky District of Tula Oblast
- Satinka, Shchyokinsky District, Tula Oblast, a village in Kostomarovskaya Rural Administration of Shchyokinsky District of Tula Oblast
