= Lavrov =

Lavrov (masculine, Russian: Лавров) or Lavrova (feminine, Russian: Лаврова) is a Russian surname. Notable people with the surname include:

== Lavrov ==
- Andrey Lavrov (born 1962), Russian handball player
- Kirill Lavrov (1925–2007), Russian actor
- Mikhail Lavrov (1799–1882), Russian rear-admiral and Arctic explorer
- Nikolai Lavrov (1802–1840), Russian baritone opera singer
- Pyotr Lavrov (1823–1900), Russian theorist of narodism, historian, philosopher, publicist, revolutionary, and sociologist
- Sergey Lavrov (born 1950), Russian diplomat and foreign minister
- Vladimir Lavrov (1919–2011), Russian diplomat
- Yuri Lavrov (1905–1980), Soviet actor

== Lavrova ==
- Anastassiya Lavrova (born 1995), Kazakhstani table tennis player
- Nadia Lavrova Shapiro (1897–1989), Russian-American journalist, intelligence agent
- Natalia Lavrova (1984–2010), Russian gymnast
- Tatyana Lavrova (1938–2007), Russian actress

== See also ==
- Lavrovo
