= Rublevo railway station =

Railway station in Rublyovka, Russia

Rublyovka Рублёво
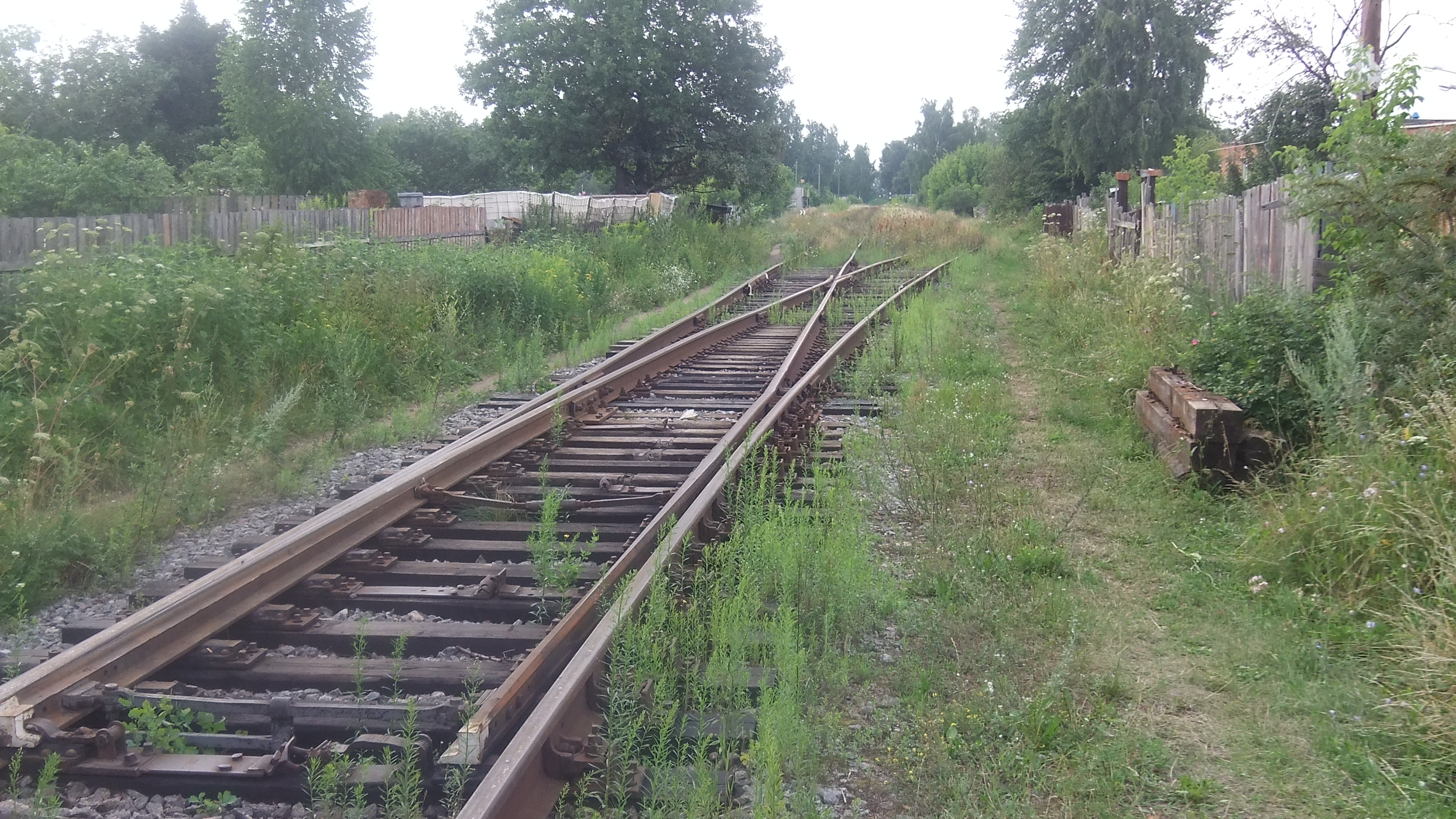

General information
- Location: Moscow; Russia
- Coordinates: 55°46′29″N 37°20′30″E
- Tracks: 3

History
- Opened: 1926
Location

Rublevo railway station is in the village of Rublyovka, part of the western region of Moscow. It is the only station on a 4 km offshoot of the branch line from Rabochiy Poselok to Usovo. The branch was built approximately in 1917–1918. The station is used by the Rublevskaya waterworks for the delivery of chlorine and other materials. It is closed to passengers.

== History ==
In recent years, most commonly used in the branch Metal, the former once one more full deadlock branch running from the station Rublyovo. According to old maps to the 30s branch was laid until this area Trinity Lykovo - Sosnovka-2, reaching up to the Moscow River, allegedly for the needs of the wood. Somewhere in the early - mid-30s this branch abolished (now on it goes asphalt road from Moscow to Troitse-Lykovo), paving the other, the area constructed at the same time Cherepkovskaya treatment plants (according to other sources - to the developed clay pit ), so that a branch somewhere else half kilometers was present on the territory of the municipality "Krylatskoye". In the area of the garden "Friendship" and up to the Ring Road is still saved her visual symptoms.

The branch operated approximately up to the late 1950s to the early 1960s, and ceased to exist in connection with the construction of the Ring Road to cut it, and then was cut to current borders (about 150–200 meters from the highway in the territory Rublevskoye present steel center).

Prior to the 1990s, the Rublevo branch had a guarded level crossing with a barrier across the Rublevo-Uspenskoe Shosse accompanied by a dwelling house and signal box with two semaphore signal. The house and other buildings have been demolished, the barrier has been removed, and the signals are defunct. Therefore, train movements require manual closure of the road by police. The power lines along the railway line are no longer functioning. The few trains that use the line usually consist of two to five different cars. The track is usable, but poorly maintained, and trains usually move slowly to Rublevo.
