= Satinskiy Selsoviet =

Village in Tambov Oblast of Russia

Satinskiy Selsoviet Сатинский сельсовет
- Selsoviet
- Location within Tambov Oblast Location within European Russia Location within Russia
- Coordinates: 52°22′37″N 41°40′25″E
- Country: Russia
- Federal subject: Tambov Oblast
- Raion: Sampursky
- Adm. center: Satinka
- Boroughs: Locality: 11 settlements

Government
  - Chairman: Kozodaeva Larisa Fedorovna

Area
  - Total: 291.91 km^{2} (112.71 sq mi)
- Elevation: 140 m (460 ft)

Population (2021)
  - Total: 5,331
  - Density: 18.26/km^{2} (47.30/sq mi)
- OKTMO code: 68632420

Satinskiy Selsoviet (Russian: Сатинский сельсовет) is a municipal formation with the status of a rural settlement in the Sampursky District, Tambov Oblast, Russia. Its administrative center is the village of Satinka.

The selsoviet covers an area of 291.91 square kilometers. As of the year 2021, its total population is 5,331.

== History ==
On 17 September 2004, the No. 232-Z Law of the Tambov Oblast established the boundary of the municipality and the status of the selsoviet as a rural settlement.

On 8 November 2010, the No. 702-Z Law of the Tambov Oblast incorporated Periksinsky Selsoviet (Периксинский сельсовет) into Satinskiy Selsoviet.

On 24 May 2013, the No. 271-3 Law of the Tambov Oblast incorporated Mednensky Solsoviet (Медненский сельсовет) into Satinskiy Selsoviet.

== Population ==
Historical population
Year	Pop.	±% p.a.
2010	4,837	—
2012	5,340	+5.07%
2013	5,226	−2.13%
2014	5,668	+8.46%
2015	5,568	−1.76%
2016	5,419	−2.68%
2017	5,321	−1.81%
2018	5,253	−1.28%
2019	5,107	−2.78%
2020	5,049	−1.14%
2021	5,331	+5.59%

== Administrative divisions ==
Administrative divisions of Satinskiy Selosoviet
No.	Locality	Transliteration	Type	Population (2010)
1	Александро-Павловка	Aleksandro-Pavlovka	Village	73
2	Андреевка	Andreevka	Village	6
3	Берёзовка	Berezovka	Village	5
4	Дмитриевка	Dmitrievka	Village	340
5	Кензарь-Бабино	Kenzar-Babino	Village	9
6	Медное	Mednoe	Village	425
7	Осино-Лазовка	Osino-Lazovka	Village	250
8	Перикса	Periksa	Village	692
9	Петровка	Petrovka	Village	594
10	Сатинка	Satinka	Village	3,301
11	Солонцовка	Solontsovka	Village	80
N/A	Козелец	Kozelets	Village, Abolished in 2003	N/A
