= Sampur, Russia =

Rural locality in Sampursky District, Tambov Oblast, Russia

Coordinates: 52°18′49″N 41°37′38″E

Sampur (Russian: Сампур) is a rural locality (a selo) in Sampursky District of Tambov Oblast, Russia, located on the Tsna River.

Sampur was founded in 1732 by two retired soldiers, Stepan Pavlovich Pronin and Ivan Osipovich Dementyev, who were each granted ten desyatinas of land for service excellence. Sampur was first mentioned as a village in 1811 Audit records. In 1898, after a church was built, Sampur became a selo. The population currently resides around 104 people, as of June 1998.

During Soviet times, Sampur served as the administrative center of Sampursky District until 1981, at which time the administrative center was moved to the settlement of Satinka.
