= Alexander Antonov (politician) =

Russian revolutionary and military leader (1889–1922)

Aleksandr Antonov
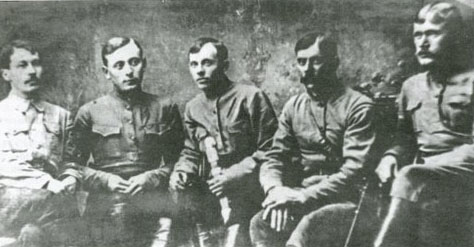
- Commanding staff of the Blue Army of the Tambov Oblast (Antonov seated in the middle)
- Born: Aleksandr Stepanovich Antonov; 26 July 1889; Moscow, Imperial Russia
- Died: 24 June 1922 (aged 32); Shybriay, Tambov Governorate, Russian SFSR
- Cause of death: Killed in action
- Occupations: Revolutionary, politician, rebel leader
- Known for: Tambov Rebellion
- Political party: Socialist Revolutionary Party; Left Socialist-Revolutionaries (from 1918)

Aleksandr Stepanovich Antonov (Russian: Алекса́ндр Степа́нович Анто́нов; 26 July 1889 – 24 June 1922) was a Russian revolutionary, member of the Socialist Revolutionary Party, and one of the leaders of the Tambov Rebellion against the Bolshevik regime.

== Early life ==
Antonov was born in Moscow in 1889 to Nataliia Ivanovna Sokolova and Stepan Gavrilovich Antonov, however his family moved to Kirsanov in his father's native Tambov Governorate soon after his birth. Parish documents record the family as lower middle-class. In Kirsanov, Nataliia worked as a seamstress and milliner and Stepan, a former non-commissioned officer in the Russian army, worked as a tinker, although his business was unsuccessful. Antonov had two elder sisters, Valentina and Anna, and a younger brother Dimitri Antonov. As a teenager he worked for a local grain trader. His mother died when he was about 16 years old. He had moved out of home by the time Stepan and Dimitri moved to Inzhavino in 1907 or 1908.

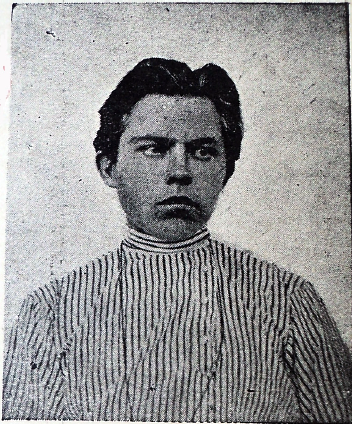
Picture of a young Antonov, 1890s

== Entry into politics ==
It is unknown exactly when Antonov became involved in radical politics. At some point he joined the Socialist Revolutionary Party. He first appears on police records as a known revolutionary in 1908, when he travelled to Tambov to establish connections between his group and the Tambov Socialist Revolutionaries. Antonov became an "expropriator", someone who carried out robberies to support the revolutionary cause (called "expropriations" by revolutionaries). Antonov is associated with the robbery of a railway station in Inzhavino, where a note was left stating the exact amount taken "by the party of anarchists-individualists", signed by "a member of the party". He was also involved in the robbery of a bank in Kaninskii, where the amount taken was entered into the accounts book as being confiscated by "the Volga Union of Independent Socialist-Revolutionaries".

On 20 February 1909, Antonov was arrested in Saratov, during an investigation into a plot to assassinate the commander-in-chief of the Kazan region, General Sadetskii. He does not appear to have been involved in this plot, but was imprisoned for his involvement in robberies. He was given 20 years of katorga, spending the first part of his sentence in the Schlisselburg fortress and the rest in Vladimirsky Central.

== February Revolution and the Kirsanov Republic ==
In February 1917, Antonov was released from prison by the amnesty for political prisoners proclaimed by the Russian Provisional Government after the February Revolution. He initially stayed with his sister Valentina in the city of Tambov, taking around a month to recover his health from his time in prison. Antonov began working for the Militia, the new law enforcement organisation replacing the Tsarist Police. He had useful connections in the political circumstances, for instance his defence lawyer from his trial in 1910, V. P. Isheev, was now Chair of the Tambov Municipal Duma.

On May 13, the Duma representatives of Kirsanov declared the town to be an independent republic. A leading figure in this was the businessman A. K. Trunin, who declared himself "Procurer-General". This was not the result of a popular movement, unrelated to other declarations of local republics in provincial towns or the seizure of land from estates. The political nature of the "Kirsanov Republic" is unclear besides its opposition to the Provisional Government, with various sources calling it "bourgeois", "anarchist", "bolshevik" or "blackhundred". Antonov was chosen to lead a contingent of Militia to arrest the leaders of this "republic". Antonov's men encountered a large crowd outside the municipal Duma building in Kirsanov, their attempt to arrest Trunin was resisted and eventually led to a shootout. The "republicans" surrendered, but a crowd assailed Antonov's group and freed them, simultaneously arresting Antonov. The local army garrison intervened to arrest Trunin and restore order, however the incident had led to 8 deaths.

In October, officials of the Kirsanov uezd requested that Antonov be made head of the uezd Militia. Around this time Antonov married his girlfriend, Sofiia Vasil'evna Orlova-Bogoliubskaia. Sofiia's brother Aleksandr also had connections to Kirsanov, and similarly to Antonov had been involved in "expropriations" before the revolution. Antonov left his new wife in Tambov to take up his new appointment in Kirsanov.

== October Revolution, Tambov Rebellion and death ==
When the Bolsheviks seized power in November, there was no Bolshevik presence in the Kirsanov, where the Duma was dominated by liberals and moderate Socialists and the Soviet by Socialist-Revolutionaries and Mensheviks. There was a gradual transfer of power from the Duma to the Soviet. The Bolshevik presence in Kirsanov began to grow as Bolshevik-supporting soldiers returned from World War I, and the Bolshevik regime began to impose its control on the countryside. A branch of the Cheka was founded in Kirsanov in April 1918. Non-Bolshevik officials like Antonov were placed under pressure to align themselves with the regime or leave their posts. It is known that Antonov eventually joined the Left Socialist-Revolutionaries, who were initially aligned with the Bolshevik regime, however he had little involvement in their party implying this was probably a pragmatic decision to keep his position.

In Kirsanov he organised and became one of the leaders of the Tambov Rebellion against the Bolshevik regime. On 24 June 1922, cornered by a Cheka detachment near the village of Shybriay near Borisoglebsk, he was killed in a firefight along with his brother, Dmitriy. Documents state that he fought to the end, never laying down his weapon. Antonov was buried in Tambov, along with the other members of his group and his brother Dmitriy, near the walls of the monastery Kazan Mother of God on the fifth day after he perished.

== Family ==
On 21 December 1922, while in prison, Antonov’s partner, peasant Natalia Katasonova (1888–1945) from the village of Nizhny Shibryay, gave birth to a daughter named Eva. Eva Katasonova (1922–1975) bore the patronymic Fyodorovna (after her mother’s brother). After marriage, she took the surname Gorelik and worked as a schoolteacher in Chelyabinsk.

== Bibliography ==
- Landis, Eric C. (2008). Bandits and Partisans: The Antonov Movement in the Russian Civil War. Pitt Series in Russian and East European Studies. Pittsburgh: University of Pittsburgh Press. p. 381. ISBN 9780822943433.
