= Fonovka =

Rural locality in Petrovsky District, Tambov Oblast, Russia

Coordinates: 52°31′N 40°18′E

Fonovka (Russian: Фоновка) is a village in Petrovsky District of Tambov Oblast, Russia.
