= Platonovka =

Platonovka (Russian: Платоновка) is the name of several rural localities in Russia.

Modern localities

- Platonovka, Kursk Oblast, a khutor in Shevelevsky Selsoviet of Oboyansky District of Kursk Oblast
- Platonovka, Novosibirsk Oblast, a village in Tatarsky District of Novosibirsk Oblast
- Platonovka, Omsk Oblast, a village in Cherlaksky Rural Okrug of Novovarshavsky District of Omsk Oblast
- Platonovka, Rostov Oblast, a khutor in Otradovskoye Rural Settlement of Azovsky District of Rostov Oblast
- Platonovka, Samara Oblast, a selo in Shigonsky District of Samara Oblast
- Platonovka, Tambov Oblast, a selo in Platonovsky Selsoviet of Rasskazovsky District of Tambov Oblast
- Platonovka, Republic of Tatarstan, a village in Arsky District of the Republic of Tatarstan
- Platonovka, Tula Oblast, a village in Kruglikovsky Rural Okrug of Yefremovsky District of Tula Oblast
- Platonovka, Voronezh Oblast, a village in Tambovskoye Rural Settlement of Ternovsky District of Voronezh Oblast

Historical localities

- Platonovka, Arkhangelsk Governorate, a colony included in Alexandrovskaya Volost of Alexandrovsky Uyezd of Arkhangelsk Governorate of the Russian SFSR upon its establishment in 1920
