= Platonovka, Voronezh Oblast =

Platonovka Платоновка
- Village
- Location within Voronezh Oblast Location within Russia
- Coordinates: 51°42′N 41°05′E
- Country: Russia
- Region: Voronezh Oblast
- District: Ternovsky District
- Time zone: UTC+3:00

Platonovka (Russian: Платоновка) is a rural locality (a village) in Tambovskoye Rural Settlement, Ternovsky District, Voronezh Oblast, Russia. The population was 51 as of 2010. There are 2 streets.

== Geography ==
Platonovka is located 46 km west of Ternovka (the district's administrative centre) by road. Tambovka is the nearest rural locality.
