= Petrovskaya, Velikoustyugsky District, Vologda Oblast =

Petrovskaya Петровская
- Village
- Location within Vologda Oblast Location within Russia
- Coordinates: 60°47′N 46°21′E
- Country: Russia
- Region: Vologda Oblast
- District: Velikoustyugsky District
- Time zone: UTC+3:00

Petrovskaya (Russian: Петровская) is a rural locality (a village) in Yudinskoye Rural Settlement, Velikoustyugsky District, Vologda Oblast, Russia. The population was 20 as of 2002.

== Geography ==
Petrovskaya is located 5 km northeast of Veliky Ustyug (the district's administrative centre) by road. Aksyonovo is the nearest rural locality.
