= Petrovsky, Volgograd Oblast =

Petrovsky Петровский
- Khutor
- Location within Volgograd Oblast Location within Russia
- Coordinates: 50°45′10″N 41°58′30″E
- Country: Russia
- Region: Volgograd Oblast
- District: Uryupinsky District
- Time zone: UTC+4:00

Petrovsky (Russian: Петровский) is a rural locality (a khutor) and the administrative center of Petrovskoye Rural Settlement, Uryupinsky District, Volgograd Oblast, Russia. The population was 2,874 as of 2010. There are 29 streets.

== Geography ==
Petrovsky is located in steppe, on the left bank of the Kamenka River, 7 km southwest of Uryupinsk (the district's administrative centre) by road. Uryupinsk is the nearest rural locality.
