= Petrovskaya, Kargopolsky District, Arkhangelsk Oblast =

Petrovskaya Петровская
- Village
- Location within Arkhangelsk Oblast Location within Russia
- Coordinates: 61°36′N 38°49′E
- Country: Russia
- Region: Arkhangelsk Oblast
- District: Kargopolsky District
- Time zone: UTC+3:00

Petrovskaya (Russian: Петровская) is a rural locality (a village) in Kargopolsky District, Arkhangelsk Oblast, Russia. The population was 142 as of 2012. There are 3 streets.

== Geography ==
Petrovskaya is located 15 km north of Kargopol (the district's administrative centre) by road. Turovo is the nearest rural locality.
