= Lavrovo, Rameshkovsky District, Tver Oblast =

Rural locality in Rameshkovsky District, Tver Oblast, Russia

Coordinates: 57°16′51″N 36°16′05″E

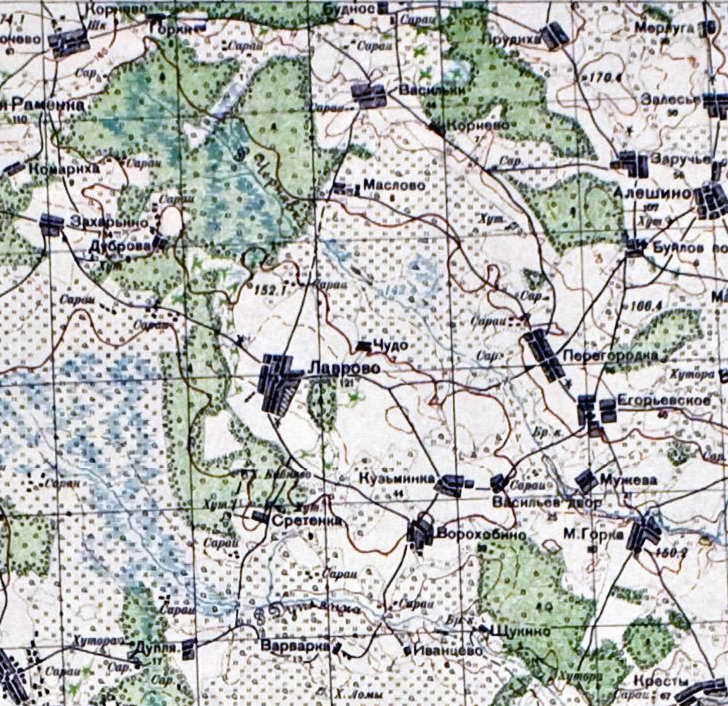
Lavrovo on the 1930s map

Lavrovo (Russian: Лавро́во) is a rural locality (a village) in Rameshkovsky District of Tver Oblast, Russia, located 17 kilometers (11 mi) east of Rameshki, the administrative center of the district. Within the framework of municipal divisions, it is a part of Aleshino Rural Settlement of Rameshkovsky Municipal District. Its estimated population in 2008 was 74.

The village was first mentioned in the 18th century as a part of the Karelian volost of the Tsar. Later, it became a part of the landed properties of the imperial family (udel).

In 1709, the village population was 19 males living in six households; twenty houses in the village stood empty.

In 1859, the village was a part of Bezhetsky Uyezd of Tver Governorate and had a population of 294 (149 males and 145 females) comprising thirty-six households.

By 1887, the population increased to 390 (190 males and 200 females) comprising seventy-seven households. The population consisted mostly of the Karelians and former udel peasants. Thirty-four males were literate, and seven were in military service.

In 1894, a parochial school was opened in the village. By 1897, the population of the village increased to 420, of whom 410 were Karelians.

Lavrovsky Selsoviet was established in 1918 and existed until 1959. In 1930, "Karelsky Rassvet" (lit. "Karelian Dawn") collective farm was established in the village.

In 1936, the population of Lavrovo was 598 people comprising 135 households. Of those, 122 households with 541 people were employed by the collective farm. There was also a windmill, a facility for production of the vegetable fats and oils, and two forges. Educational facilities included an elementary school taught in Karelian and a village reading room.

In 1950, the village collective farm was merged with "Pobeda" collective farm in Pustoramenka.

At the 1989 Census, the village population was 48, of whom 35 were Karelians and 13 Russians. By 1996, the population increased to 105 people in 57 households. In 2001, the population was 96, living in 49 houses; additionally 41 houses were used mostly as dachas. There is a post office, a basic medical facility, and a store in the village.
