= Petrovsky, Astrakhan Oblast =

Petrovsky Петровский
- Settlement
- Location within Astrakhan Oblast Location within Russia
- Coordinates: 45°49′N 47°39′E
- Country: Russia
- Region: Astrakhan Oblast
- District: Ikryaninsky District
- Time zone: UTC+4:00

Petrovsky (Russian: Петровский) is a rural locality (a settlement) in Ikryaninsky District, Astrakhan Oblast, Russia. The population was 16 as of 2010. There are 3 streets.

== Geography ==
Petrovsky is located 38 km south of Ikryanoye (the district's administrative centre) by road. Sedlistoye is the nearest rural locality.
