= Nadia Lavrova Shapiro =

Russian-American writer, translator and intelligence agent (1897–1989)

- Born: Nadezhda Lazarevna Shapiro; October 20, 1897; Yelisavetgrad, Kherson Governorate, Russian Empire
- Died: June 20, 1989 (aged 91); Santa Rosa, California, U.S.
- Education: Moscow Women's College, 1917; University of California, Berkeley, 1923
- Occupations: Writer; journalist; translator; intelligence agent
- Writing career
- Pen name: Nadia Lavrova; NL; Nadezhda Lavrova; Eve Christmas

Nadia Lavrova Shapiro (née Nadezhda Lazarevna Shapiro: October 20, 1897 – June 20, 1989) was a Russian-born American writer, journalist, translator and intelligence agent.

== Early life and education ==
Shapiro was born Nadezhda Lazarevna Shapiro on October 20, 1897 in Yelisavetgrad, Kherson Governorate (present-day Kropyvnytskyi, Ukraine) (Note: Also cited as Irkutsk.) to Lazar Solomonovich Shapiro, an attorney from Minsk, and Fanny Gregorievna Shapiro (died 1957), who was born in Kyiv. One of two sisters, the family moved to the Siberian city of Irkutsk during Shapiro's early childhood. Raised in a middle-class Lutheran household, Shapiro's paternal grandfather had converted to Lutheranism from Judaism.

She went to school in Paris for two years to learn French, learned German and English from other travels. Earning her high school diploma in May 1914, the family later moved to the Siberian city of Blagoveshchensk where Shapiro's father worked as an attorney for the State Bank. Remaining in Blagoveschensk, Shapiro studied in for a elementary school teacher certificate from 1915 to 1916. The following year Shapiro studied at for a year at Moscow Women's College where she earned a teaching credential in 1917.

== Career and exile ==
Shapiro taught English in Siberia for about a year, before she and her family fled the tumult of the Russian Revolution, moving first to China. In Harbin, she worked as an interpreter, newspaper editor, and journalist. She worked in Japan in 1920, and moved to the United States in 1922. She covered Russian exiles and the arts, and wrote book reviews, for the San Francisco Examiner, and sold stories to magazines. In 1923 she earned a bachelor's degree from the University of California, Berkeley.

In the 1930s she worked for the Works Progress Administration in San Francisco. During World War II she was a translator for the U.S. Office of Censorship and the U.S. Office of War Information. Shapiro was a translator for the United Nations Conference on International Organization when it met in San Francisco in 1945. From 1946 to 1953 she worked for the CIA, monitoring Russian-language broadcasts.

== Personal life ==
Shapiro became a United States citizen by naturalization in 1928. Her mother moved to the United States to live with her in 1929. Shapiro died in 1989, at the age of 91, in Santa Rosa, California. Her papers are in the Hoover Institution Library and Archives at Stanford University.

== Publications ==
- "The Talisman" (1923, Weird Tales)
- "100 Lyric Poems Composed by Mill Valley (Cal.) Boy" (1924, Greek Review)
- He Who Rules Last: A Dramatic Tale (1927, one-act play)
- "Chinese Princess Builds Palace and Holds Court on Mexican Island" (1929, The Leatherneck)
- "Pete Fanning Writes of Crimes" (1929, San Francisco Examiner)
- "My Old Home Town Was Blagoveschensk" (1933, Los Angeles Times)
- "Forty-Six Artists, One Palette" (1934, The Christian Science Monitor)
- "Soviet Art in San Francisco" (1935, The Christian Science Monitor)
- "Matisse Show in San Francisco" (1936, The Christian Science Monitor)
- (as Eve Christmas) "The Burning of a Witch" (1968, Ellery Queen's Mystery Magazine)
