= Petrovskoye, Paninsky District, Voronezh Oblast =

Petrovskoye Петровское
- Selo
- Location within Voronezh Oblast Location within Russia
- Coordinates: 51°42′N 40°12′E
- Country: Russia
- Region: Voronezh Oblast
- District: Paninsky District
- Time zone: UTC+3:00

Petrovskoye (Russian: Петровское) is a rural locality (a selo) in Perelyoshinskoye Urban Settlement, Paninsky District, Voronezh Oblast, Russia. The population was 361 as of 2010. There are 5 streets.

== Geography ==
Petrovskoye is located 11 km northeast of Panino (the district's administrative centre) by road. Pereleshinsky is the nearest rural locality.
