= Bondari, Tambov Oblast =

Bondari, Tambov Oblast Бондари
- Location of Bondari, Tambov Oblast
- Location of Bondari, Tambov Oblast
- Coordinates: 52°57′N 42°4′E
- Country: Russia
- Federal subject: Tambov Oblast
- Founded: 1699

Population (2010 Census)
  - Total: 4,052
- Demonym(s): coopers, coopers (Russian: бо́ндарец, бо́ндарцы)

Municipal status
  - Municipal district: Bondarsky District
  - Rural settlement: Bondarsky Village Council
- Time zone: UTC+3 (MSK)
- Postal code(s): 393230
- OKTMO ID: 68602405101

Bondari (Russian: Бондари) is a rural locality (a selo) serving as the administrative center of the district. With a population of approximately 4,000 residents, Bondari is situated 75 kilometers northeast of Tambov and 35 kilometers north of the Platonovka railway station along the Tambov-Rtishchevo line. Nestled along the Bolshoy Lomovis River, a tributary of the Tsna river, Bondari is known for its main dairy facility, the Bondari Milk and Cheese Factory, which serves as a significant source of dairy products for the entire Tambov Oblast region.

== History ==
Bondari has a history dating back to its foundation in 1699 as a village on the land of Odnodvortsy with Arable Corner. Initially, the village was named Anastasievskoe and in 1725, it was granted by Empress Catherine I to the Master of the Horse V.P. Pospelov, who transferred serfs from various estates to the village. The inhabitants were engaged in agriculture and crafts, including cooperage, and Bondari was known as the center of cloth production. The first cloth factory was built in 1726, and by the 1870s, there were already three cloth factories in the village. In the mid-19th century, beet sugar and distilleries were established, adding to the village's economy.

== Demography ==
Historical population
Year	Pop.	±%
1959	2,965	—
1970	2,744	−7.5%
1979	3,444	+25.5%
1989	4,364	+26.7%
2002	4,068	−6.8%
2010	4,052	−0.4%
