= Petrovsky, Republic of Bashkortostan =

Petrovsky Петровский
- Khutor
- Location within Bashkortostan Location within Russia
- Coordinates: 53°06′N 56°19′E
- Country: Russia
- Region: Bashkortostan
- District: Meleuzovsky District
- Time zone: UTC+5:00

Petrovsky (Russian: Петровский) is a rural locality (a khutor) in Alexandrovsky Selsoviet, Meleuzovsky District, Bashkortostan, Russia. The population was 14 as of 2010. There are 2 streets.

== Geography ==
Petrovsky is located 41 km northeast of Meleuz (the district's administrative centre) by road. Khlebodarovka is the nearest rural locality.
