= Petrovskaya, Vozhegodsky District, Vologda Oblast =

Petrovskaya Петровская
- Village
- Location within Vologda Oblast Location within Russia
- Coordinates: 60°25′N 40°05′E
- Country: Russia
- Region: Vologda Oblast
- District: Vozhegodsky District
- Time zone: UTC+3:00

Petrovskaya (Russian: Петровская) is a rural locality (a village) in Vozhegodskoye Urban Settlement, Vozhegodsky District, Vologda Oblast, Russia. The population was 3 as of 2002.

== Geography ==
Petrovskaya is located 10 km southwest of Vozhega (the district's administrative centre) by road. Novozhilikha is the nearest rural locality.
