= Glazok =

Rural locality in Michurinsky District, Tambov Oblast, Russia

Coordinates: 53°06′N 40°42′E

Glazok (Russian: Глазок) is a village (selo) in Michurinsky District of Tambov Oblast, Russia.
