= Petrovskoye, Cherepovetsky District, Vologda Oblast =

Petrovskoye Петровское
- Village
- Location within Vologda Oblast Location within Russia
- Coordinates: 58°48′N 38°21′E
- Country: Russia
- Region: Vologda Oblast
- District: Cherepovetsky District
- Time zone: UTC+3:00

Petrovskoye (Russian: Петровское) is a rural locality (a village) in Myaksinskoye Rural Settlement, Cherepovetsky District, Vologda Oblast, Russia. The population was 7 as of 2002.

== Geography ==
Petrovskoye is located 49 km (30 mi) southeast of Cherepovets (the district's administrative centre) by road. Pavlokovo is the nearest rural locality.
