= Petrovskoye, Ishimbaysky District, Republic of Bashkortostan =

Petrovskoye Петровское
- Selo
- Location within Bashkortostan Location within Russia
- Coordinates: 53°37′00″N 56°23′18″E
- Country: Russia
- Region: Bashkortostan
- District: Ishimbaysky District
- Time zone: UTC+5:00

Petrovskoye (Russian: Петро́вское) is a rural locality (a selo) and the administrative centre of Petrovsky Selsoviet, Ishimbaysky District, Bashkortostan, Russia. The population was 2,580 as of 2010. There are 21 streets.

== Geography ==
Petrovskoye is located 35 km northeast of Ishimbay (the district's administrative centre) by road. Vasilyevka is the nearest rural locality.
