= Petrovskoye, Privolzhsky District, Ivanovo Oblast =

Petrovskoye Петровское
- Village
- Location within Ivanovo Oblast Location within Russia
- Coordinates: 57°20′N 41°12′E
- Country: Russia
- Region: Ivanovo Oblast
- District: Privolzhsky District
- Time zone: UTC+3:00

Petrovskoye (Russian: Петровское) is a rural locality (a village) in Privolzhsky District, Ivanovo Oblast, Russia. Population: 10 (2010 census);

== Geography ==
This rural locality is located 8 kilometres (5.0 mi) from Privolzhsk (the district's administrative centre), 40 kilometres (25 mi) from Ivanovo (capital of Ivanovo Oblast) and 277 kilometres (172 mi) from Moscow. Stolovo is the nearest rural locality.
