= Michurinsky District =

Michurinsky District Мичуринский район (Russian)
- District
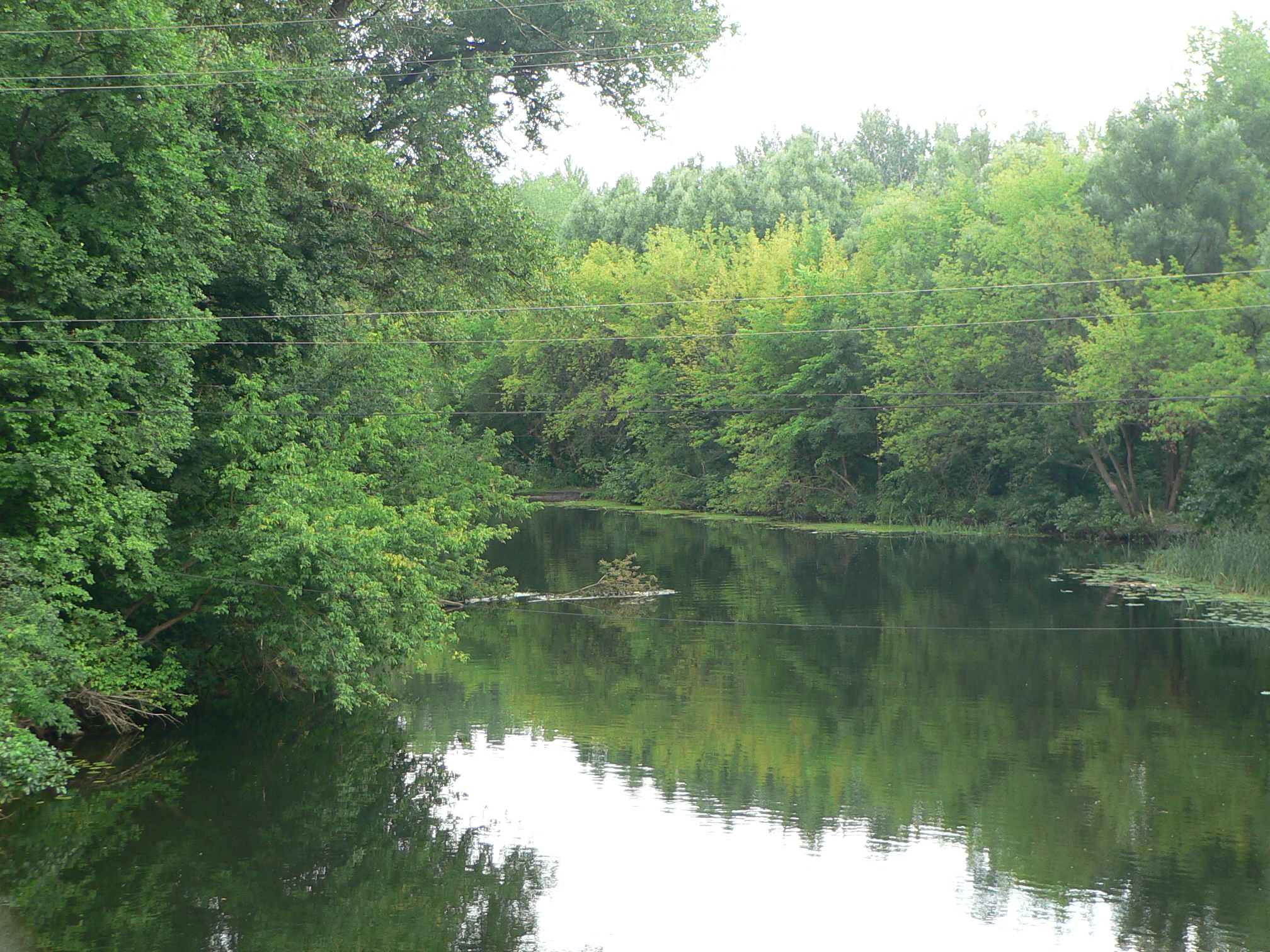
- Voronesh Forest

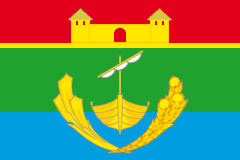
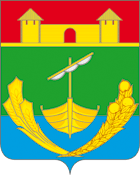
- Flag Coat of arms
- Location of Michurinsky District in Tambov Oblast
- Coordinates: 52°54′21″N 40°29′53″E
- Country: Russia
- Federal subject: Tambov Oblast
- Established: 9 June 1928
- Administrative center: Michurinsk

Area
  - Total: 1,655.25 km^{2} (639.10 sq mi)

Population (2010 Census)
  - Total: 34,245
  - Density: 20.689/km^{2} (53.584/sq mi)
  - Urban: 0%
  - Rural: 100%

Administrative structure
  - Administrative divisions: 14 selsoviet
  - Inhabited localities: 82 rural localities

Municipal structure
  - Municipally incorporated as: Michurinsky Municipal District
  - Municipal divisions: 0 urban settlements, 14 rural settlements
- Time zone: UTC+3 (MSK)
- OKTMO ID: 68612000
- Website: http://www.michrn.ru/

Michurinsky District (Russian: Мичу́ринский райо́н) is an administrative and municipal district (raion), one of the twenty-three in Tambov Oblast, Russia. It is located in the northwest of the oblast. The district borders with Pervomaysky District in the north, Nikiforovsky District in the east, Petrovsky District in the south, and with Dobrovsky District of Lipetsk Oblast in the west. The area of the district is 1,655.25 square kilometers (639.10 sq mi). Its administrative center is the town of Michurinsk (which is not administratively a part of the district). Population: 34,245 (2010 Census); 35,196 (2002 census); 39,224 (1989 Soviet census).

== Administrative and municipal status ==
Within the framework of administrative divisions, Michurinsky District is one of the twenty-three in the oblast. The town of Michurinsk serves as its administrative center, despite being incorporated separately as a town of oblast significance—an administrative unit with the status equal to that of the districts.

As a municipal division, the district is incorporated as Michurinsky Municipal District. The town of oblast significance of Michurinsk is incorporated separately from the district as Michurinsk Urban Okrug.

== Notable residents ==
- Afanasy Grigoriev (1782–1868), Neoclassical architect, born in Vasilievskaya
- Afanasiy Remnyov (1890–1919), Soviet soldier during the Russian Civil War

== See also ==
- Glazok
