= Petrovsky, Pankrushikhinsky District, Altai Krai =

Petrovsky Петровский
- Settlement
- Location within Altai Krai Location within Russia
- Coordinates: 54°01′N 80°14′E
- Country: Russia
- Region: Altai Krai
- District: Pankrushikhinsky District
- Time zone: UTC+7:00

Petrovsky (Russian: Петровский) is a rural locality (a settlement) in Lukovsky Selsoviet, Pankrushikhinsky District, Altai Krai, Russia. The population was 90 as of 2013. There are 2 streets.

== Geography ==
Petrovsky is located 27 km north of Pankrushikha (the district's administrative centre) by road. Lensky is the nearest rural locality.
