= Staroyuryevo =

Rural locality in Tambov Oblast, Russia

Coordinates: 53°19′15″N 40°41′58″E

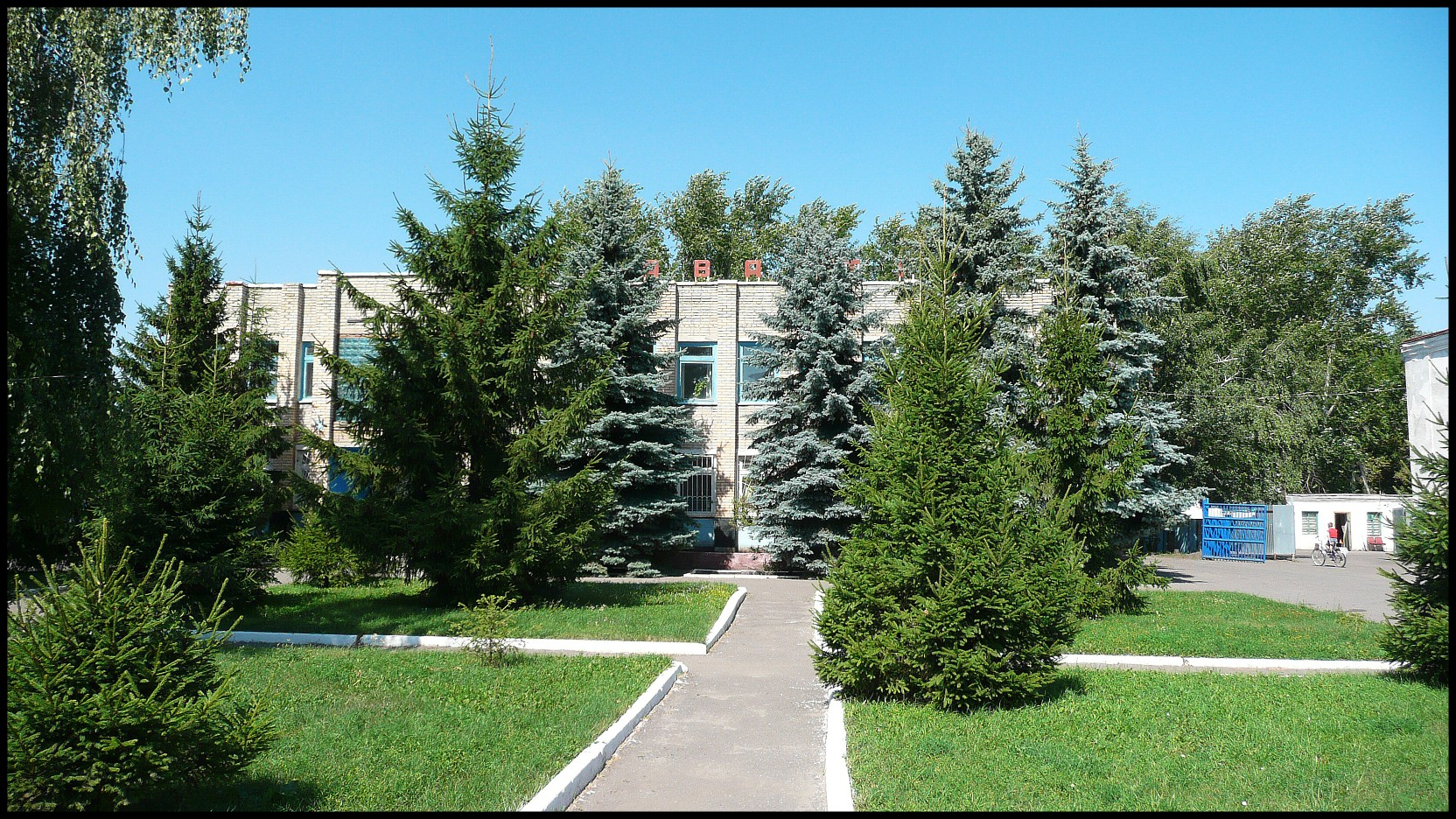
A building of Staroyuryevo

Staroyuryevo (Russian: Староюрьево) is a rural locality (a selo) and the administrative center of Staroyuryevsky District, Tambov Oblast, Russia. Population: 6,144 (2010 census); 6,886 (2002 census); 7,722 (1989 Soviet census).
