= Petrovsky, Starooskolsky District, Belgorod Oblast =

Petrovsky Петровский
- Settlement
- Location within Belgorod Oblast Location within Russia
- Coordinates: 51°04′N 38°04′E
- Country: Russia
- Region: Belgorod Oblast
- District: Starooskolsky District
- Time zone: UTC+3:00

Petrovsky (Russian: Петровский) is a rural locality (a settlement) in Starooskolsky District, Belgorod Oblast, Russia. The population was 121 as of 2010. There is 1 street.

== Geography ==
Petrovsky is located 42 km southeast of Stary Oskol (the district's administrative centre) by road. Malotroitskoye is the nearest rural locality.
