= Petrovskoye, Iglinsky District, Republic of Bashkortostan =

Petrovskoye Петровское
- Village
- Location within Bashkortostan Location within Russia
- Coordinates: 54°42′N 56°41′E
- Country: Russia
- Region: Bashkortostan
- District: Iglinsky District
- Time zone: UTC+5:00

Petrovskoye (Russian: Петровское) is a rural locality (a village) in Kaltovsky Selsoviet, Iglinsky District, Bashkortostan, Russia. The population was 15 as of 2010. There are 3 streets in the district.

== Geography ==
Petrovskoye is located 34 km southeast of Iglino (the district's administrative centre) by road. Kommunar is the nearest rural locality.
