= Usovo, Tambov Oblast =

Village in Tambov Oblast, Russia

Coordinates: 52°53′47″N 42°22′52″E

Usovo (Russian: Усово) is a village in Bondarsky District of Tambov Oblast, Russia.
