= Bukari =

Village in Tambov Oblast, Russia

Coordinates: 52°20′N 41°10′E

Bukari (Russian: Букари) is a village in Znamensky District of Tambov Oblast, Russia.
