= Petrovskoye, Petrovsky District, Tambov Oblast =

Rural locality in Tambov Oblast, Russia

Coordinates: 52°38′09″N 40°14′57″E

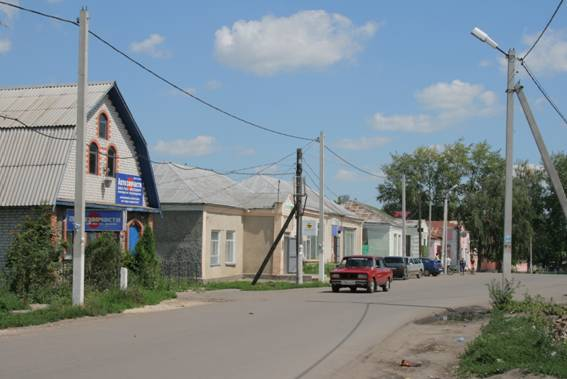
Street of Petrovskoye

Petrovskoye (Russian: Петровское) is a rural locality (a selo) and the administrative center of Petrovsky District, Tambov Oblast, Russia. Population: 5,710 (2010 census); 5,993 (2002 census); 5,828 (1989 Soviet census).
