= Bondarsky District =

Bondarsky District Бондарский район (Russian)
- District
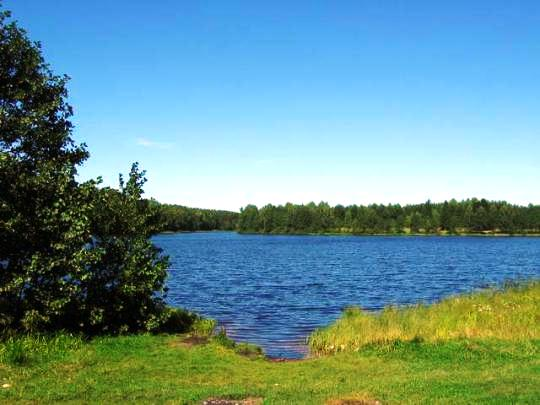
- Lake in Bondarsky District

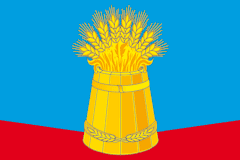
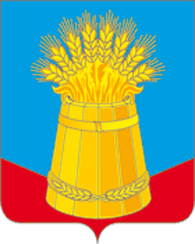
- Flag Coat of arms
- Location of Bondarsky District in Tambov Oblast
- Coordinates: 52°57′N 42°04′E
- Country: Russia
- Federal subject: Tambov Oblast
- Established: 1928
- Administrative center: Bondari

Area
  - Total: 1,252.3 km^{2} (483.5 sq mi)

Population (2010 Census)
  - Total: 13,191
  - Density: 10.533/km^{2} (27.281/sq mi)
  - Urban: 0%
  - Rural: 100%

Administrative structure
  - Administrative divisions: 8 selsoviet
  - Inhabited localities: 56 rural localities

Municipal structure
  - Municipally incorporated as: Bondarsky Municipal District
  - Municipal divisions: 0 urban settlements, 8 rural settlements
- Time zone: UTC+3 (MSK)
- OKTMO ID: 68602000
- Website: http://r34.tambov.gov.ru/

Bondarsky District (Russian: Бо́ндарский райо́н) is an administrative and municipal district (raion), one of the twenty-three in Tambov Oblast, Russia. It is located in the northeastern central part of the oblast. The district borders with Pichayevsky District in the north, Gavrilovsky District in the east, Rasskazovsky District in the south, and with Tambovsky District in the west. The area of the district is 1,252.3 square kilometers (483.5 sq mi). Its administrative center is the rural locality (a selo) of Bondari. Population: 13,191 (2010 Census); 15,311 (2002 census); 18,723 (1989 Soviet census). The population of Bondari accounts for 44% of the district's total population. The district has 11 villages and 56 rural settlements.

== Geography ==
Bondarsky District is in the east-central region of Tambov Oblast, about 20 km northeast of the city of Tambov, and 40 km south of Morshansk. There are three main rivers running south-to-north through the district – the Bolshoy Lomovis through the middle, the Malaya Lomovis on the east, and the Kersha River on the west. The rivers ultimately empty through the Moksha River into the Volga River. Bondarsky District is on the Oka–Don Lowland, with small spurs of the Volga Uplands on the east side. The terrain is flat with draws and ravines, with steppe and forest-steppe vegetation. The black soil of the district supports agriculture. The western side of the district is forested.

The district is elongated in shape, measuring about 25 km north–south and 50 km west–east. The administrative center of the district is the city of Bondari.

As of January, 2016, the three largest towns are Bondari (pop. 4,997), Pahotnouglovsky (pop. 1,299), and Mitropolsky (pop. 1,157).

=== Climate ===
Average temperature in nearby Tambov in January is −10 °C (14 °F), and average July temperature is 20 °C (68 °F). Annual precipitation is 550 millimeters (22 in), and falls mostly in April through October. The climate is Humid continental climate, cool summer, (Dfb). This climate is characterized by large swings in temperature, both diurnally and seasonally, with mild summers and cold, snowy winters.

== Economy ==
Employment in the district is focused on food processing and agriculture.

=== Agriculture ===
Bondarsky is an agricultural district, with farm revenues split about 30% crops and 70% livestock (including dairy). The most important grains are sunflower, barley, and wheat. Approximately 34,983 hectares (28%) of the total area of the district is in cultivation for crops. In 2014, the top seven crops by area were:

Crop	Cultivated area (ha)	% of cultivated area
sunflower grain	10065	29
summer barley	5243	15
winter wheat	4815	14
spring wheat	4215	12
spring rape (colza)	2773	8
soybean	1406	4
peas	1383	4
