= Lvovo, Tambov Oblast =

Rural locality in Tokaryovsky District, Tambov Oblast, Russia

Coordinates: 52°03′44″N 41°28′18″E

Lvovo (Russian: Льво́во) is a rural locality (a selo) in Tokaryovsky District of Tambov Oblast, Russia.

According to the 1816 audit, the village belonged to the family of the Collegiate Councillor Ivan Dmitriyevich Trofimov, who, with his wife, Nadezhda Trofimova, owned 320 serfs there.
