= Sampursky District =

Sampursky District Сампурский район
- District
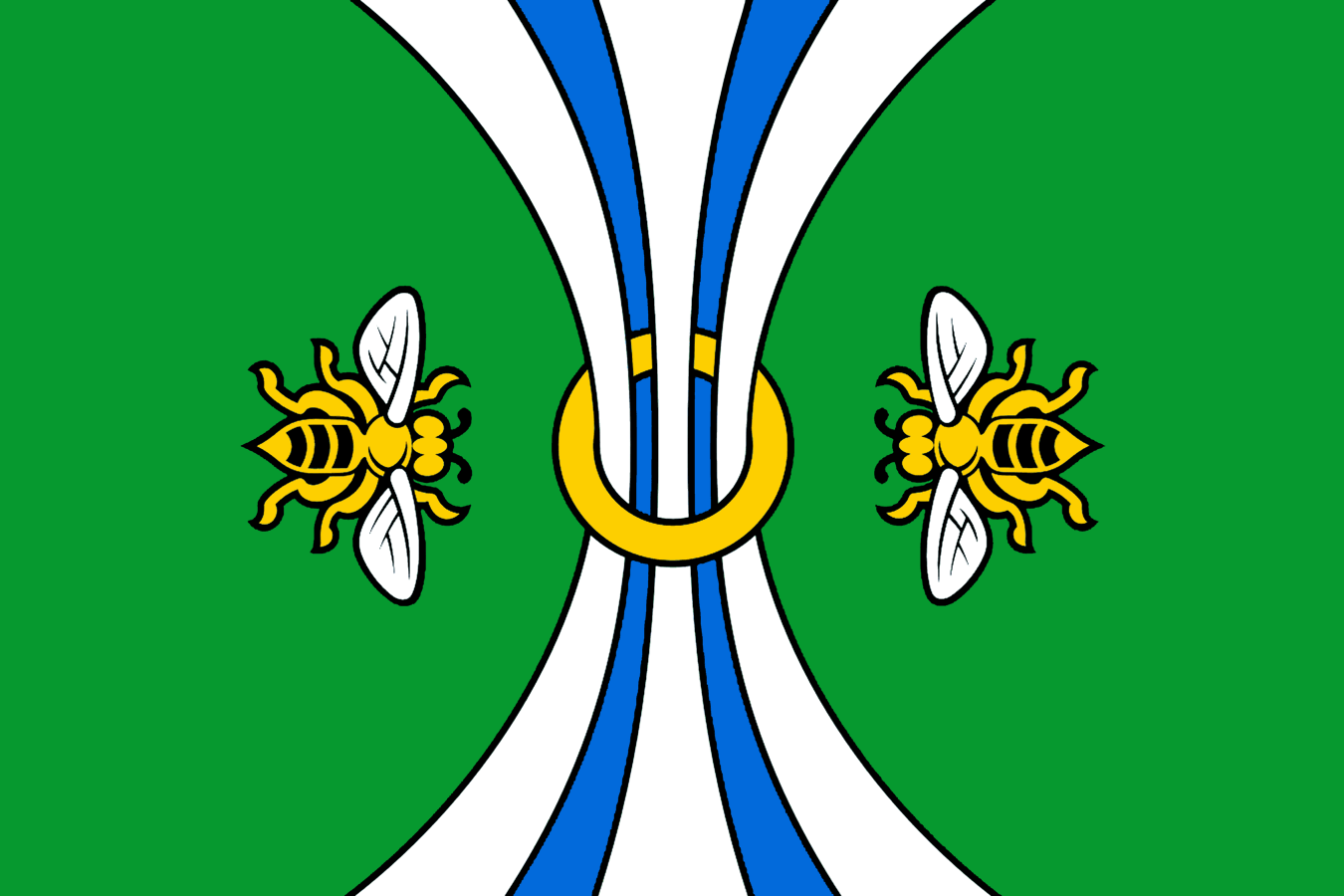
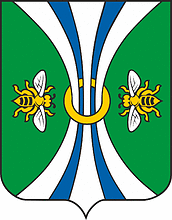
- Flag Coat of arms
- Location of Sampursky District in Tambov Oblast
- Coordinates: 52°22′37″N 41°40′15″E
- Country: Russia
- Federal subject: Tambov Oblast
- Administrative center: Satinka

Area
  - Total: 1,008 km^{2} (389 sq mi)

Population (2010 Census)
  - Total: 14,204
  - Density: 14.09/km^{2} (36.50/sq mi)
  - Urban: 0%
  - Rural: 100%

Administrative structure
  - Administrative divisions: 5 Selsoviets
  - Inhabited localities: 37 rural localities

Municipal structure
  - Municipally incorporated as: Sampursky Municipal District
  - Municipal divisions: 0 urban settlements, 5 rural settlements
- Time zone: UTC+3 (MSK)
- OKTMO ID: 68632000
- Website: http://r56.tmbreg.ru/

Sampursky District (Russian: Са́мпурский райо́н) is an administrative and municipal district (raion), one of the twenty-three in Tambov Oblast, Russia. It is located in the south of the oblast. The district borders with Rasskazovsky District in the north, Rzhaksinsky District in the east, Zherdevsky District in the south, and with Znamensky District in the west. The area of the district is 1,008 square kilometers (389 sq mi). Its administrative center is the rural locality (a settlement) of Satinka. Population: 14,204 (2010 Census); 16,487 (2002 Census); 18,721 (1989 Soviet census). The population of Satinka accounts for 25.1% of the district's total population.

== Administrative divisions ==
There are five selsoviets under the district:

No.	Selsoviets	Administrative Center	Number of settlements	Population (2021)	Area (km^{2})
1=	Bakharevsky=	Bakharevo=	4=	763=	157.50
2=	Ivanovo=	Ivanovka=	12=	2,289	244.98
3=	Sampur=	Sampur=	7=	2,544	167.14
4=	Satinskiy	Satinka	11=	5,331	291.91
5=	Seredinovsky=	Seredinovka=	3=	826=	146.45

== Sources ==
- Тамбовская областная Дума. Закон №72-З от 21 июня 1996 г. «Об административно-территориальном устройстве Тамбовской области», в ред. Закона №544-З от 11 июня 2015 г. «О внесении изменений в статью 7 Закона Тамбовской области "Об административно-территориальном устройстве Тамбовской области"». Опубликован: "Тамбовская жизнь", №131, 1996 г. (Tambov Oblast Duma. Law #72-Z of June 21, 1996 On the Administrative-Territorial Structure of Tambov Oblast, as amended by the Law #544-Z of June 11, 2015 On Amending Article 7 of the Law of Tambov Oblast "On the Administrative-Territorial Structure of Tambov Oblast". ).
- Тамбовская областная Дума. Закон №232-З от 17 сентября 2004 г. «Об установлении границ и определении места нахождения представительных органов муниципальных образований в Тамбовской области», в ред. Закона №606-З от 7 декабря 2015 г. «О внесении изменений в Закон Тамбовской области "Об установлении границ и определении места нахождения представительных органов муниципальных образований в Тамбовской области"». Вступил в силу со дня официального опубликования. Опубликован: "Тамбовская жизнь", №185 (23125). (Tambov Oblast Duma. Law #232-Z of September 17, 2004 On Establishing the Borders and Determining the Location of the Representative Organs of the Municipal Formations of Tambov Oblast, as amended by the Law #606-Z of December 7, 2015 On Amending the Law of Tambov Oblast "On Establishing the Borders and Determining the Location of the Representative Organs of the Municipal Formations of Tambov Oblast". Effective as of the official publication date.).
