= Lavrovo, Tambov Oblast =

Village in Tambov Oblast, Russia

Coordinates: 52°20′20″N 40°56′48″E

Lavrovo (Russian: Лаврово) is a village (selo) in Mordovsky District of Tambov Oblast, Russia.
