= Mozdok, Tambov Oblast =

Rural locality in Uvarovsky District, Tambov Oblast, Russia

Coordinates: 51°57′20″N 41°56′30″E

Mozdok (Russian: Моздок) is a village in Uvarovsky District of Tambov Oblast, Russia.
