= Petrovsky District, Tambov Oblast =

Petrovsky District Петровский район (Russian)
- District
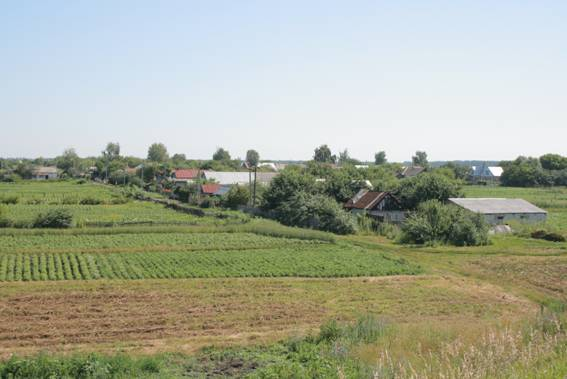
- Peskovatka Village

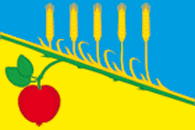
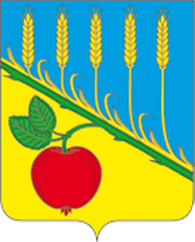
- Flag Coat of arms
- Location of Petrovsky District in Tambov Oblast
- Coordinates: 52°38′00″N 40°15′43″E
- Country: Russia
- Federal subject: Tambov Oblast
- Administrative center: Petrovskoye

Area
  - Total: 1,779 km^{2} (687 sq mi)

Population (2010 Census)
  - Total: 19,074
  - Density: 10.72/km^{2} (27.77/sq mi)
  - Urban: 0%
  - Rural: 100%

Administrative structure
  - Administrative divisions: 12 Selsoviets
  - Inhabited localities: 114 rural localities

Municipal structure
  - Municipally incorporated as: Petrovsky Municipal District
  - Municipal divisions: 0 urban settlements, 12 rural settlements
- Time zone: UTC+3 (MSK)
- OKTMO ID: 68624000
- Website: http://r44.tambov.gov.ru/

Petrovsky District (Russian: Петро́вский райо́н) is an administrative and municipal district (raion), one of the twenty-three in Tambov Oblast, Russia. It is located in the west of the oblast. The area of the district is 1,779 square kilometers (687 sq mi). Its administrative center is the rural locality (a selo) of Petrovskoye. Population: 19,074 (2010 Census); 23,374 (2002 census); 28,190 (1989 Soviet census). The population of Petrovskoye accounts for 29.9% of the district's total population.

== Geography ==
Petrovsky District is on the western border of Tambov Oblast, with Lipetsk Oblast to its west. It is about 50 km west of the city of Tambov, and 100 km north of Voronezh. Through the district runs the Matyra River, a tributary of the Voronezh River, and part of the Don River basin. The terrain is flat and gently rolling steppe. The black soil of the district supports agriculture, and there are deposits of limestone and other minerals in the area.

The district is about 60 km long and 30 km wide. The administrative center of the district is the city of Petrovskoye. The Lipetsk-Tambov highway runs across the middle of the district. Subdivisions of the district include 12 rural settlements.

As of January, 2016, the three largest towns are Petrovsky (pop. 8,485), Vochovsky (pop. 1,580), and Shemansky (pop. 1,139). To the north, the area is bordered by Michurinsky District, in the east by Nikiforovsky District, in the south by Mordovsky District, and in the west by Gryazinsky District of Lipetsk Oblast.

=== Climate ===
Average January temperature is −10.5 °C (13.1 °F), and average July temperature is 20 °C (68 °F). Annual precipitation is 450–500 millimeters (18–20 in). The climate is Humid continental climate, cool summer, (Dfb). This climate is characterized by large swings in temperature, both diurnally and seasonally, with mild summers and cold, snowy winters.

The risk of drought is 20-40%; a severe drought occurs every 10–12 years. Because the Tambov Plain is essentially in a trough between the Central Uplands and the Volga Uplands, cold Arctic air can penetrate further south than in other areas. Frost is possible from October through May.

== History ==
The area was settled by Slavs at least as early as the 11th century in the village Yablovontsky. The central village of Petrovsky was founded in the late 18th century. In 1868, the South East Railway was laid through the district, on which the Izberdey train station was built. During WWII, Petrovsky District sent 25,000 soldiers to the front. According to the district's website, more than half did not return. The farmers of the district raised funds for a tank column.

The village of Znamenka was the home of six generations of the Rachmaninoff family. Sergei Rachmaninoff first visited in 1868, and the village has a satellite museum sponsored by the main museum at his 1890-1917 summer home at Ivanovka estate farther east near Tambov.

Alexander Lodygin, one of the inventors of the incandescent light bulb, was from the village of Stenshino, in the district.

== Agriculture ==
Petrovsky is a grain-growing district - primarily wheat, sunflower and barley. Approximately 110,700 hectares (62%) of the total area of the district is in cultivation for crops. Orchards (apples and pears) and berry fields make up about 1% (1,190 hectares). In 2014, the top seven crops by area were:

Crop	Cultivated Area (ha)	% of Cultivated Area
Winter wheat	31,915	29
Sunflower grain	28,714	26
Barley summer	26,618	24
Spring wheat	5,350	5
Corn for grain	4,989	5
Sugar beet (factory)	3,594	3
Soybean	2,844	3

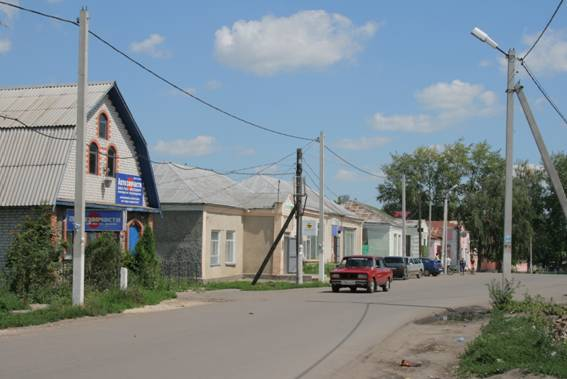
Street scene in Petrovskoye

== Transportation ==
The Michurinsk-Gryazi line of the South Easter Railway crosses Petrovsky District through the town of Petrovsky, with stations 'Peskovatka' and 'Izberdey'. Detailed route map of South East Railway (in Russian) A major highway from Lipetsk to Tambov runs west-east across the middle of the district.

== Notable residents ==
- Mikhail De Pulet (1822—1885), literary critic and historian, born in the village of Khrennoye
- Alexander Lodygin (Alexandre de Lodyguine; 1847–1923), electrical engineer and inventor, born in the village of Stenshino
