= Satino, Tambov Oblast =

Rural locality in Inzhavinsky District, Tambov Oblast, Russia

Coordinates: 52°06′19″N 42°36′34″E

Satino (Russian: Сатино) is a village and it is around 286 mi (or 461 km) South-East of Moscow, the country's capital city.

.
