= Shapkino, Tambov Oblast =

Rural locality in Muchkapsky District, Tambov Oblast, Russia

Coordinates: 51°42′29″N 42°23′14″E

Shapkino is a village in the Muchkapsky District of the Tambov region of Russia. It is also the administrative center of the village council of Shapkino.

== Geography ==
The village of Shapkino is located in the southern part of the Tambov region, near the confluence of the Volochila river into the river Vorona.

== Population ==
The population of the Shapkino is 1,791 people (2002).

== History ==
The village was founded as a rural locality (stanitsa). Originally named Isapova, it has been known as Shapkino since the 1820s. The first historical mention of the village came in 1707. The Landratskoy Census of 1710 listed its population at 78 people. In 1816, the village contained 2,966 people. In 1911 it was listed as having a population of 7,220 people.

In the years 1938–1956 Shapkino served as the administrative center of the Shapkino Center district.

On December 27, 2011, the Shapkino village council unanimously approved the Shabkino village coat of arms. An idea for the coat of arms stems from the historical location of the Shakino village which is situated at the confluence of two rivers. As a result, a blue fork-shaped cross symbolizes the confluence of Vorona and Isap. Further, one can see images of a horse and willow branch on a yellow background. The horse symbolizes the power and strength of Shapkino people, while the willow branch represents the influence of Mordovian culture on Shapkino's history. The etymology of the word "Isap" comes two words: from the Mordovian "Isa" (willow) and the ending "ap" which meant "water, river" in many languages. Next, dressed in golden robe and armed with a fiery sword and shield, the Holy Archangel Michael represents the Russian army and the victory of the forces of good over the forces of evil. Finally, the red, blue, and yellow colors of the coat of arms symbolize the Kazak heritage of the region. The first residents of the village were serving Cossacks and boyar children. The black color represents the wealth of the Shapkino land.

== Places of interest ==
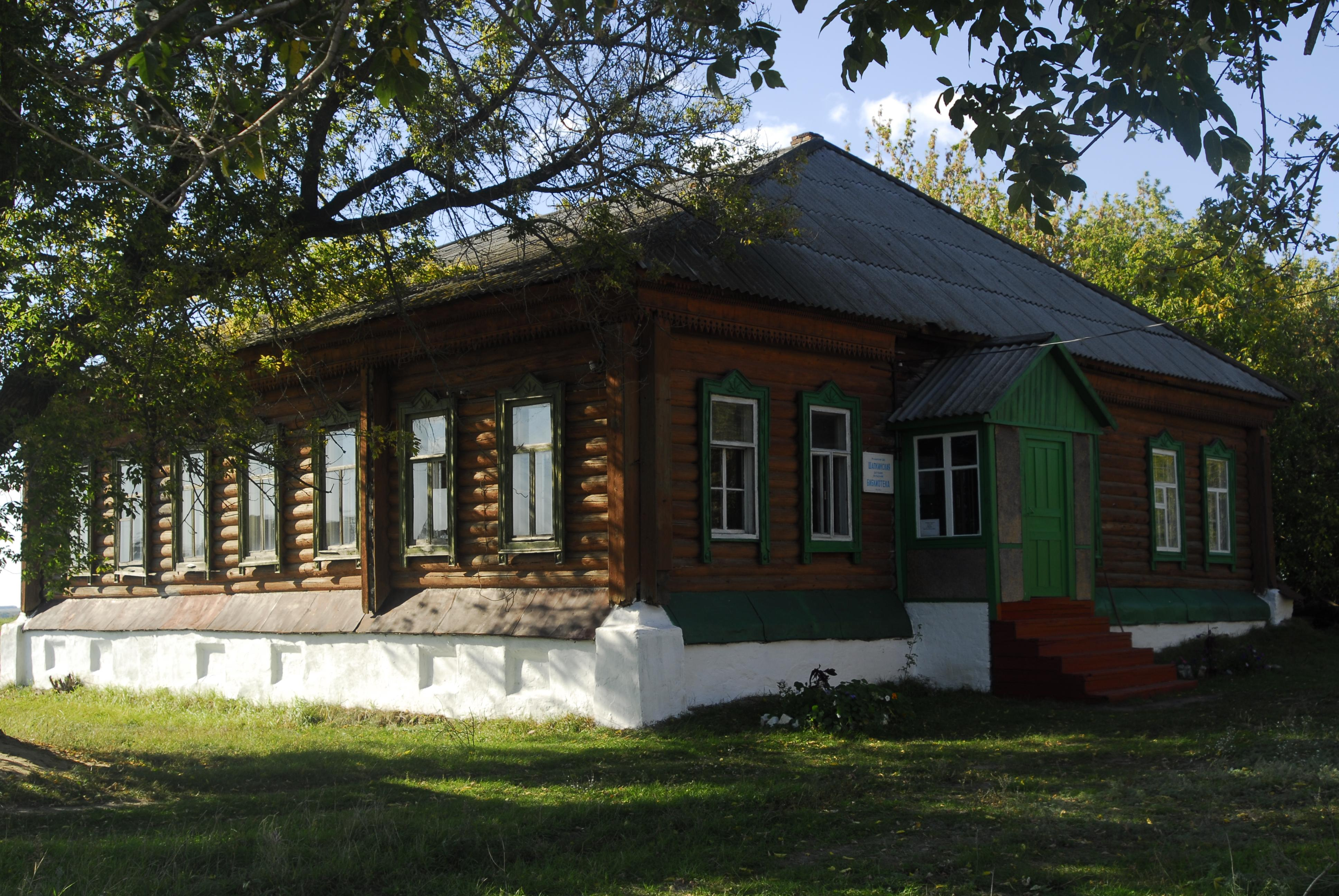
Museum in Village Shapkino, Tambov region

The Shapkino Local History Museum "Istoki" is located on the 180 sq.m. of the former Shapkino Volost Administration's building. This nineteenth-century house is the only surviving administrative wooden building in the Tambov region. One of the museum rooms is furnished in a rustic style to demonstrate peasant life. Visitors will see old household items, peasant arts and crafts exhibits, as well as nineteenth- and twentieth-century coins, photographs, furniture, and clothes. In addition, the museum has a section that relays the early days of the Shapkino village and its residents. A special place is devoted to the lacework of tablecloths and towels by local masters of the late nineteenth -and early twentieth centuries. Finally, the archaeological section includes exhibits collected during excavations in the village of Shapkino.

== Sport ==
In early November of each year, the marathon Muchkap-Shapkino-Lubol passes through the streets of the village, over a total distance of 42 kilometers and 195 meters. The same day, a smaller race of 1,055 meters takes place over meters for children. Each year, marathon participants assist in the planting of trees on the avenue on which the race follows until a total of 42,195 trees are planted there.

In recent years, local boxing has experienced a dynamic increase in popularity in the village of Shapkino. Young men from the Muchkapsky District regularly participate in tournaments in Russian National and Central Federal District.

Shapkino is the venue for the All-Russia boxing tournament. The tournament occurs annually on the first Saturday and Sunday of February. A second boxing tournament is held in September.

Historically, Shapkino was represented by a team participating in the first national tournament of Lapta, a type of Russian baseball. The tournament took place in September, 1957 in the village of Dinskaya, Krasnodar Krai district Plastunovskoy.
