= Satinka, Tambov Oblast =

Rural locality in Tambov Oblast, Russia

Coordinates: 52°22′37″N 41°40′26″E

Satinka (Russian: Сатинка) is a rural locality (a settlement) and the administrative center of Satinskiy Selsoviet, Sampursky District, Tambov Oblast, Russia. Population: 3,567 (2010 census); 3,708 (2002 census); 3,669 (1989 Soviet census).
