= Alexandrovka, Russia =

Alexandrovka (Russian: Алекса́ндровка), also romanized Aleksandrovka, is a common name shared by a number of rural localities in Russia. It is typically derived from or related to the first name Alexander.

== Modern inhabited localities ==
=== Altai Krai ===
Altai Krai distribution map
Distribution of the inhabited localities called "Alexandrovka" in Altai Krai

As of 2008, nine rural localities in Altai Krai bear this name:

- Alexandrovka, Blagoveshchensky District, Altai Krai, a settlement in Alexeyevsky Selsoviet of Blagoveshchensky District, 52°54′15″N 80°35′25″E
- Alexandrovka, Kalmansky District, Altai Krai, a settlement in Novoromanovsky Selsoviet of Kalmansky District, 53°03′00″N 83°24′07″E
- Alexandrovka, Loktevsky District, Altai Krai, a selo in Alexandrovsky Selsoviet of Loktevsky District, 51°07′45″N 81°41′34″E
- Alexandrovka, Nemetsky National District, Altai Krai, a selo in Orlovsky Selsoviet of Nemetsky National District, 53°19′N 79°10′E
- Alexandrovka, Smolensky District, Altai Krai, a selo in Kirovsky Selsoviet of Smolensky District, 52°13′37″N 85°02′47″E
- Alexandrovka, Soloneshensky District, Altai Krai, a selo in Sibiryachikhinsky Selsoviet of Soloneshensky District, 51°40′31″N 83°57′36″E
- Alexandrovka, Suyetsky District, Altai Krai, a selo in Alexandrovsky Selsoviet of Suyetsky District, 53°14′N 80°12′E
- Alexandrovka, Tabunsky District, Altai Krai, a selo in Altaysky Selsoviet of Tabunsky District, 52°42′31″N 78°41′53″E
- Alexandrovka, Zavyalovsky District, Altai Krai, a settlement in Chernavsky Selsoviet of Zavyalovsky District, 52°41′24″N 80°41′22″E

=== Altai Republic ===
Altai Republic location map
Location of Alexandrovka in the Altai Republic

As of 2008, one rural locality in the Altai Republic bears this name:

- Alexandrovka, Altai Republic, a selo in Biryulinskoye Rural Settlement of Mayminsky District, 51°44′15″N 86°06′55″E

=== Amur Oblast ===
Amur Oblast location map
Location of Alexandrovka in Amur Oblast

As of 2009, one rural locality in Amur Oblast bears this name:

- Alexandrovka, Amur Oblast, a selo in Nikolayevsky Rural Settlement of Zeysky District, 53°35′31″N 126°57′35″E

=== Republic of Bashkortostan ===
Republic of Bashkortostan distribution map
Distribution of the inhabited localities called "Alexandrovka" in the Republic of Bashkortostan.

As of 2008, seventeen rural localities in the Republic of Bashkortostan bear this name:

- Alexandrovka, Alsheyevsky District, Republic of Bashkortostan, a village in Nikifarovsky Selsoviet of Alsheyevsky District, 53°48′36″N 54°38′58″E
- Alexandrovka, Aurgazinsky District, Republic of Bashkortostan, a village in Stepanovsky Selsoviet of Aurgazinsky District, 54°02′44″N 55°43′31″E
- Alexandrovka, Bakalinsky District, Republic of Bashkortostan, a village in Buzyurovsky Selsoviet of Bakalinsky District, 55°06′33″N 53°29′48″E
- Alexandrovka, Beloretsky District, Republic of Bashkortostan, a village in Inzersky Selsoviet of Beloretsky District, 54°18′18″N 57°35′44″E
- Alexandrovka, Birsky District, Republic of Bashkortostan, a khutor in Kusekeyevsky Selsoviet of Birsky District, 55°24′19″N 55°16′39″E
- Alexandrovka, Bizhbulyaksky District, Republic of Bashkortostan, a village in Kalininsky Selsoviet of Bizhbulyaksky District, 53°49′46″N 54°17′58″E
- Alexandrovka, Bedeyevo-Polyansky Selsoviet, Blagoveshchensky District, Republic of Bashkortostan, a village in Bedeyevo-Polyansky Selsoviet of Blagoveshchensky District, 55°17′06″N 56°24′39″E
- Alexandrovka, Sanninsky Selsoviet, Blagoveshchensky District, Republic of Bashkortostan, a village in Sanninsky Selsoviet of Blagoveshchensky District, 55°16′17″N 56°04′38″E
- Alexandrovka, Chishminsky District, Republic of Bashkortostan, a village in Novotroitsky Selsoviet of Chishminsky District, 54°29′30″N 55°23′29″E
- Alexandrovka, Davlekanovsky District, Republic of Bashkortostan, a village in Alginsky Selsoviet of Davlekanovsky District, 54°18′45″N 54°47′04″E
- Alexandrovka, Kaltasinsky District, Republic of Bashkortostan, a village in Kaltasinsky Selsoviet of Kaltasinsky District, 55°57′15″N 54°48′07″E
- Alexandrovka, Karaidelsky District, Republic of Bashkortostan, a selo in Kirzinsky Selsoviet of Karaidelsky District, 55°31′30″N 56°57′31″E
- Alexandrovka, Buzovyazovsky Selsoviet, Karmaskalinsky District, Republic of Bashkortostan, a selo in Buzovyazovsky Selsoviet of Karmaskalinsky District, 54°17′36″N 55°54′20″E
- Alexandrovka, Kamyshlinsky Selsoviet, Karmaskalinsky District, Republic of Bashkortostan, a selo in Kamyshlinsky Selsoviet of Karmaskalinsky District, 54°11′43″N 56°18′29″E
- Alexandrovka, Kugarchinsky District, Republic of Bashkortostan, a selo in Yumaguzinsky Selsoviet of Kugarchinsky District, 52°53′07″N 56°20′14″E
- Alexandrovka, Meleuzovsky District, Republic of Bashkortostan, a selo in Alexandrovsky Selsoviet of Meleuzovsky District, 53°02′04″N 56°14′53″E
- Alexandrovka, Tuymazinsky District, Republic of Bashkortostan, a village in Kandrinsky Selsoviet of Tuymazinsky District, 54°32′46″N 54°00′27″E

=== Belgorod Oblast ===
As of 2009, six rural localities in Belgorod Oblast bear this name:

- Alexandrovka, Chernyansky District, Belgorod Oblast, a selo in Chernyansky District, 50°58′15″N 38°06′07″E
- Alexandrovka, Korochansky District, Belgorod Oblast, a selo in Korochansky District, 50°50′40″N 36°54′43″E
- Alexandrovka, Rakityansky District, Belgorod Oblast, a selo in Vengerovsky Rural Okrug of Rakityansky District, 50°52′52″N 36°01′11″E
- Alexandrovka (khutor), Shebekinsky District, Belgorod Oblast, a khutor in Shebekinsky District, 50°38′51″N 37°14′46″E
- Alexandrovka (selo), Shebekinsky District, Belgorod Oblast, a selo in Shebekinsky District; 50°31′43″N 37°30′58″E
- Alexandrovka, Volokonovsky District, Belgorod Oblast, a selo in Golofeyevsky Rural Okrug of Volokonovsky District, 50°24′50″N 37°58′25″E

=== Bryansk Oblast ===
Bryansk Oblast distribution map
Distribution of the inhabited localities called "Alexandrovka" in Bryansk Oblast

As of 2013, five rural localities in Bryansk Oblast bear this name:

- Alexandrovka, Kletnyansky District, Bryansk Oblast, a village in Semirichsky Rural Administrative Okrug of Kletnyansky District, 53°24′06″N 32°48′39″E
- Alexandrovka, Pochepsky District, Bryansk Oblast, a village in Milechsky Rural Administrative Okrug of Pochepsky District, 52°51′02″N 33°47′56″E
- Alexandrovka, Surazhsky District, Bryansk Oblast, a village in Dushatinsky Rural Administrative Okrug of Surazhsky District, 53°06′53″N 32°17′24″E
- Alexandrovka, Unechsky District, Bryansk Oblast, a settlement in Zadubensky Rural Administrative Okrug of Unechsky District, 52°49′18″N 33°02′33″E
- Alexandrovka, Zhukovsky District, Bryansk Oblast, a village in Khodilovichsky Rural Administrative Okrug of Zhukovsky District, 53°40′14″N 33°57′44″E

=== Chelyabinsk Oblast ===
Chelyabinsk Oblast distribution map
Distribution of the inhabited localities called "Alexandrovka" in Chelyabinsk Oblast

As of 2008, six rural localities in Chelyabinsk Oblast bear this name:

- Alexandrovka, Katav-Ivanovsky District, Chelyabinsk Oblast, a settlement in Tyulyuksky Selosviet of Katav-Ivanovsky District, 54°30′39″N 58°36′15″E
- Alexandrovka, Kusinsky District, Chelyabinsk Oblast, a settlement under the administrative jurisdiction of the work settlement of Magnitka, Kusinsky District, 55°28′39″N 59°49′47″E
- Alexandrovka, Karakulsky Selsoviet, Oktyabrsky District, Chelyabinsk Oblast, a village in Karakulsky Selsoviet of Oktyabrsky District, 54°02′53″N 62°32′02″E
- Alexandrovka, Nikolsky Selsoviet, Oktyabrsky District, Chelyabinsk Oblast, a village in Nikolsky Selsoviet of Oktyabrsky District, 54°28′30″N 62°13′37″E
- Alexandrovka, Varnensky District, Chelyabinsk Oblast, a selo in Ayatsky Selsoviet of Varnensky District, 53°08′06″N 61°41′37″E
- Alexandrovka, Yetkulsky District, Chelyabinsk Oblast, a selo in Belonosovsky Selsoviet of Yetkulsky District, 54°46′17″N 61°30′37″E

=== Chuvash Republic ===
Chuvash Republic location map
Location of Alexandrovka in the Chuvash Republic

As of 2009, one rural locality in the Chuvash Republic bears this name:

- Alexandrovka, Chuvash Republic, a village in Alexandrovskoye Rural Settlement of Komsomolsky District, 55°16′03″N 47°35′32″E

=== Republic of Crimea ===
As of 2014, three rural localities in the Republic of Crimea (a federal subject of Russia located on the Crimean Peninsula, which is disputed between Russia and Ukraine) bear this name:

- Alexandrovka, Belogorsky District, Republic of Crimea, a selo in Belogorsky District, 45°02′N 34°33′E
- Alexandrovka, Krasnogvardeysky District, Republic of Crimea, a selo in Krasnogvardeysky District, 45°35′N 34°06′E
- Alexandrovka, Simferopolsky District, Republic of Crimea, a selo in Simferopolsky District, 45°00′N 33°45′E

=== Irkutsk Oblast ===
Irkutsk Oblast distribution map
Distribution of the inhabited localities called "Alexandrovka" in Irkutsk Oblast

As of 2010, three rural localities in Irkutsk Oblast bear this name:

- Alexandrovka, Bratsky District, Irkutsk Oblast, a selo in Bratsky District, 55°25′25″N 100°55′22″E
- Alexandrovka (Mugunskoye Rural Settlement), Tulunsky District, Irkutsk Oblast, a village in Tulunsky District; municipally, a part of Mugunskoye Rural Settlement of that district, 54°28′41″N 100°22′47″E
- Alexandrovka (Burkhunskoye Rural Settlement), Tulunsky District, Irkutsk Oblast, a village in Tulunsky District; municipally, a part of Burkhunskoye Rural Settlement of that district, 54°47′29″N 100°42′28″E

=== Kaliningrad Oblast ===
Kaliningrad Oblast distribution map
Distribution of the inhabited localities called "Alexandrovka" in Kaliningrad Oblast

As of 2010, two rural localities in Kaliningrad Oblast bear this name:

- Alexandrovka, Polessky District, Kaliningrad Oblast, a settlement in Zalesovsky Rural Okrug of Polessky District, 54°50′04″N 21°29′46″E
- Alexandrovka, Zelenogradsky District, Kaliningrad Oblast, a settlement in Kovrovsky Rural Okrug of Zelenogradsky District, 54°55′07″N 20°12′27″E

=== Kaluga Oblast ===
As of 2009, eleven rural localities in Kaluga Oblast bear this name.

=== Kemerovo Oblast ===
Kemerovo Oblast distribution map
Distribution of the inhabited localities called "Alexandrovka" in Kemerovo Oblast

As of 2009, two rural localities in Kemerovo Oblast bear this name:

- Alexandrovka, Kiselyovsk, Kemerovo Oblast, a village under the administrative jurisdiction of the city of Kiselyovsk, 53°56′40″N 86°23′01″E
- Alexandrovka, Kemerovsky District, Kemerovo Oblast, a village in Yelykayevskaya Rural Territory of Kemerovsky District, 55°21′N 86°22′E

=== Kostroma Oblast ===
Kostroma Oblast location map
Location of Alexandrovka in Kostroma Oblast

As of 2009, one rural locality in Kostroma Oblast bears this name:

- Alexandrovka, Kostroma Oblast, a village in Prigorodnoye Settlement of Nerekhtsky District, 57°28′28″N 40°42′21″E

=== Krasnodar Krai ===
Krasnodar Krai distribution map
Distribution of the inhabited localities called "Alexandrovka" in Krasnodar Krai

As of 2009, two rural localities in Krasnodar Krai bear this name:

- Alexandrovka, Kushchyovsky District, Krasnodar Krai, a selo in Razdolnensky Rural Okrug of Kushchyovsky District, 46°38′13″N 39°45′12″E
- Alexandrovka, Yeysky District, Krasnodar Krai, a selo in Alexandrovsky Rural Okrug of Yeysky District, 46°38′33″N 38°23′47″E

=== Krasnoyarsk Krai ===
As of 2009, nine rural localities in Krasnoyarsk Krai bear this name.

=== Kurgan Oblast ===
Kurgan Oblast distribution map
Distribution of the inhabited localities called "Alexandrovka" in Kurgan Oblast

As of 2008, two rural localities in Kurgan Oblast bear this name:

- Alexandrovka, Lebyazhyevsky District, Kurgan Oblast, a village in Kalashinsky Selsoviet of Lebyazhyevsky District, 55°06′36″N 66°23′02″E
- Alexandrovka, Polovinsky District, Kurgan Oblast, a village in Menshchikovsky Selsoviet of Polovinsky District, 54°50′59″N 65°33′15″E

=== Kursk Oblast ===
Kursk Oblast distribution map
Distribution of the inhabited localities called "Alexandrovka" in Kursk Oblast.

As of 2008, seventeen rural localities in Kursk Oblast bear this name:

- Alexandrovka, Dmitriyevsky District, Kursk Oblast, a settlement in Melovsky Selsoviet of Dmitriyevsky District, 52°09′50″N 34°56′49″E
- Alexandrovka, Konyshyovsky District, Kursk Oblast, a khutor in Naumovsky Selsoviet of Konyshyovsky District, 51°56′49″N 35°12′42″E
- Alexandrovka, Korenevsky District, Kursk Oblast, a selo in Tolpinsky Selsoviet of Korenevsky District, 51°28′00″N 34°58′51″E
- Alexandrovka, Novoposelenovsky Selsoviet, Kursky District, Kursk Oblast, a village in Novoposelenovsky Selsoviet of Kursky District, 51°35′36″N 36°03′30″E
- Alexandrovka, Brezhnevsky Selsoviet, Kursky District, Kursk Oblast, a village in Brezhnevsky Selsoviet of Kursky District, 51°51′32″N 36°01′02″E
- Alexandrovka, Lgovsky District, Kursk Oblast, a village in Tsukanovo-Bobriksky Selsoviet of Lgovsky District, 51°30′09″N 35°24′34″E
- Alexandrovka, Kruto-Verkhovsky Selsoviet, Manturovsky District, Kursk Oblast, a village in Kruto-Verkhovsky Selsoviet of Manturovsky District, 51°24′07″N 37°23′36″E
- Alexandrovka, Zarechensky Selsoviet, Manturovsky District, Kursk Oblast, a village in Zarechensky Selsoviet of Manturovsky District, 51°30′37″N 37°26′59″E
- Alexandrovka, Nizhnereutchansky Selsoviet, Medvensky District, Kursk Oblast, a khutor in Nizhnereutchansky Selsoviet of Medvensky District, 51°23′07″N 36°00′53″E
- Alexandrovka, Gostomlyansky Selsoviet, Medvensky District, Kursk Oblast, a village in Gostomlyansky Selsoviet of Medvensky District, 51°28′53″N 35°48′15″E
- Alexandrovka, Rylsky District, Kursk Oblast, a khutor in Alexandrovsky Selsoviet of Rylsky District, 51°35′13″N 34°22′18″E
- Alexandrovka, Solntsevsky District, Kursk Oblast, a village in Zuyevsky Selsoviet of Solntsevsky District, 51°21′43″N 36°47′37″E
- Alexandrovka, Alexandrovsky Selsoviet, Sovetsky District, Kursk Oblast, a village in Alexandrovsky Selsoviet of Sovetsky District, 51°43′29″N 37°37′48″E
- Alexandrovka, Mikhayloannensky Selsoviet, Sovetsky District, Kursk Oblast, a village in Mikhayloannensky Selsoviet of Sovetsky District, 52°00′08″N 37°45′14″E
- Alexandrovka, Zheleznogorsky District, Kursk Oblast, a village in Karmanovsky Selsoviet of Zheleznogorsky District, 52°06′22″N 35°27′30″E
- Alexandrovka, Sergiyevsky Selsoviet, Zolotukhinsky District, Kursk Oblast, a village in Sergiyevsky Selsoviet of Zolotukhinsky District, 52°02′30″N 36°09′39″E
- Alexandrovka, Shestopalovsky Selsoviet, Zolotukhinsky District, Kursk Oblast, a village in Shestopalovsky Selsoviet of Zolotukhinsky District, 51°58′30″N 36°35′09″E

=== Leningrad Oblast ===
As of 2009, five rural localities in Leningrad Oblast bear this name.

=== Lipetsk Oblast ===
Lipetsk Oblast distribution map
Distribution of the inhabited localities called "Alexandrovka" in Lipetsk Oblast.

As of 2010, thirteen rural localities in Lipetsk Oblast bear this name:

- Alexandrovka, Dankovsky District, Lipetsk Oblast, a village in Berezovsky Selsoviet of Dankovsky District, 53°28′59″N 38°55′06″E
- Alexandrovka, Novocherkutinsky Selsoviet, Dobrinsky District, Lipetsk Oblast, a selo in Novocherkutinsky Selsoviet of Dobrinsky District, 52°18′16″N 40°27′52″E
- Alexandrovka, Srednematrensky Selsoviet, Dobrinsky District, Lipetsk Oblast, a village in Srednematrensky Selsoviet of Dobrinsky District, 52°07′49″N 40°11′42″E
- Alexandrovka, Dolgorukovsky District, Lipetsk Oblast, a village in Dolgushinsky Selsoviet of Dolgorukovsky District, 52°17′53″N 38°36′17″E
- Alexandrovka, Kuzovsky Selsoviet, Gryazinsky District, Lipetsk Oblast, a village in Kuzovsky Selsoviet of Gryazinsky District, 52°26′30″N 39°58′54″E
- Alexandrovka, Verkhnetelelyuysky Selsoviet, Gryazinsky District, Lipetsk Oblast, a village in Verkhnetelelyuysky Selsoviet of Gryazinsky District, 52°21′32″N 39°47′24″E
- Alexandrovka, Alexandrovsky Selsoviet, Krasninsky District, Lipetsk Oblast, a village in Alexandrovsky Selsoviet of Krasninsky District, 52°49′53″N 38°46′57″E
- Alexandrovka, Sukhodolsky Selsoviet, Krasninsky District, Lipetsk Oblast, a village in Sukhodolsky Selsoviet of Krasninsky District, 52°55′20″N 38°35′59″E
- Alexandrovka, Lipetsky District, Lipetsk Oblast, a selo in Vasilyevsky Selsoviet of Lipetsky District, 52°31′33″N 39°12′07″E
- Alexandrovka, Stanovlyansky District, Lipetsk Oblast, a village in Mikhaylovsky Selsoviet of Stanovlyansky District, 52°56′11″N 38°11′30″E
- Alexandrovka, Terbunsky District, Lipetsk Oblast, a village in Kurgano-Golovinsky Selsoviet of Terbunsky District, 52°14′29″N 38°15′14″E
- Alexandrovka, Volovsky District, Lipetsk Oblast, a village in Zakharovsky Selsoviet of Volovsky District, 52°05′57″N 38°02′50″E
- Alexandrovka, Yeletsky District, Lipetsk Oblast, a village in Kazatsky Selsoviet of Yeletsky District, 52°39′37″N 38°14′58″E

=== Mari El Republic ===
Mari El Republic distribution map
Distribution of the inhabited localities called "Alexandrovka" in the Mari El Republic

As of 2009, three rural localities in the Mari El Republic bear this name:

- Alexandrovka, Orshansky District, Mari El Republic, a village in Shulkinskoye Rural Settlement of Orshansky District, 56°58′41″N 48°21′27″E
- Alexandrovka, Sovetsky District, Mari El Republic, a village in Mikhaylovskoye Rural Settlement of Sovetsky District, 56°39′43″N 48°21′03″E
- Alexandrovka, Volzhsky District, Mari El Republic, a village in Privolzhsky Urban Settlement of Volzhsky District, 55°55′44″N 48°27′03″E

=== Republic of Mordovia ===
Mari El Republic distribution map
Distribution of the inhabited localities called "Alexandrovka" in the Republic of Mordovia

As of 2010, eight rural localities in the Republic of Mordovia bear this name:

- Alexandrovka, Bolshebereznikovsky District, Republic of Mordovia, a settlement in Russko-Naymansky Selsoviet of Bolshebereznikovsky District, 54°12′14″N 46°06′39″E
- Alexandrovka, Chamzinsky District, Republic of Mordovia, a village in Krasnoposelkovsky Selsoviet of Chamzinsky District, 54°34′54″N 45°36′59″E
- Alexandrovka, Insarsky District, Republic of Mordovia, a village in Novleysky Selsoviet of Insarsky District, 53°57′26″N 44°32′52″E
- Alexandrovka, Lyambirsky District, Republic of Mordovia, a selo in Alexandrovsky Selsoviet of Lyambirsky District, 54°15′59″N 45°15′44″E
- Alexandrovka, Ruzayevsky District, Republic of Mordovia, a village in Krasnoklinsky Selsoviet of Ruzayevsky District, 54°01′53″N 44°58′59″E
- Alexandrovka, Temnikovsky District, Republic of Mordovia, a settlement in Alexeyevsky Selsoviet of Temnikovsky District, 54°37′22″N 43°09′12″E
- Alexandrovka, Tengushevsky District, Republic of Mordovia, a village in Starokacheyevsky Selsoviet of Tengushevsky District, 54°42′44″N 42°48′43″E
- Alexandrovka, Yelnikovsky District, Republic of Mordovia, a village in Novodevichensky Selsoviet of Yelnikovsky District, 54°35′37″N 43°56′33″E

=== Moscow Oblast ===
Moscow Oblast distribution map
Distribution of the inhabited localities called "Alexandrovka" in Moscow Oblast

As of 2009, seven rural localities in Moscow Oblast bear this name:

- Alexandrovka, Krasnogorsky District, Moscow Oblast, a village in Krasnogorsky District, 55°45′10″N 37°12′59″E
- Alexandrovka, Mozhaysky District, Moscow Oblast, a village in Mozhaysky District, 55°27′41″N 35°31′14″E
- Alexandrovka, Naro-Fominsky District, Moscow Oblast, a settlement in Naro-Fominsky District, 55°24′30″N 36°47′54″E
- Alexandrovka, Ozyorsky District, Moscow Oblast, a village in Ozyorsky District, 54°52′18″N 38°27′59″E
- Alexandrovka (settlement), Podolsky District, Moscow Oblast, a settlement in Podolsky District, 55°18′49″N 37°39′30″E
- Alexandrovka (selo), Podolsky District, Moscow Oblast, a selo in Podolsky District, 55°24′47″N 37°37′00″E
- Alexandrovka, Serebryano-Prudsky District, Moscow Oblast, a village in Serebryano-Prudsky District, 54°25′53″N 38°29′16″E

=== Nizhny Novgorod Oblast ===
Nizhny Novgorod Oblast distribution map
Distribution of the inhabited localities called "Alexandrovka" in Nizhny Novgorod Oblast.

As of 2009, fourteen rural localities in Nizhny Novgorod Oblast bear this name:

- Alexandrovka, Ardatovsky District, Nizhny Novgorod Oblast, a selo in Karkaleysky Selsoviet of Ardatovsky District, 55°09′12″N 42°48′26″E
- Alexandrovka, Bolsheboldinsky District, Nizhny Novgorod Oblast, a village in Sergeyevsky Selsoviet of Bolsheboldinsky District, 55°00′41″N 45°12′41″E
- Alexandrovka, Bor, Nizhny Novgorod Oblast, a village in Lindovsky Selsoviet of the town of oblast significance of Bor, 56°38′12″N 43°59′11″E
- Alexandrovka, Bogoyavlensky Selsoviet, Dalnekonstantinovsky District, Nizhny Novgorod Oblast, a settlement in Bogoyavlensky Selsoviet of Dalnekonstantinovsky District, 55°49′39″N 43°56′14″E
- Alexandrovka, Kuzhutsky Selsoviet, Dalnekonstantinovsky District, Nizhny Novgorod Oblast, a village in Kuzhutsky Selsoviet of Dalnekonstantinovsky District, 55°54′18″N 44°04′23″E
- Alexandrovka, Gorodetsky District, Nizhny Novgorod Oblast, a village in Zarubinsky Selsoviet of Gorodetsky District, 56°29′35″N 43°49′40″E
- Alexandrovka, Lopatinsky Selsoviet, Lukoyanovsky District, Nizhny Novgorod Oblast, a selo in Lopatinsky Selsoviet of Lukoyanovsky District, 55°08′32″N 44°29′07″E
- Alexandrovka, Shandrovsky Selsoviet, Lukoyanovsky District, Nizhny Novgorod Oblast, a settlement in Shandrovsky Selsoviet of Lukoyanovsky District, 54°56′26″N 44°15′08″E
- Alexandrovka, Pavlovsky District, Nizhny Novgorod Oblast, a village in Taremsky Selsoviet of Pavlovsky District, 55°50′21″N 43°00′45″E
- Alexandrovka, Sechenovsky District, Nizhny Novgorod Oblast, a selo in Boltinsky Selsoviet of Sechenovsky District, 55°20′36″N 45°49′14″E
- Alexandrovka, Semyonov, Nizhny Novgorod Oblast, a village in Bokovskoy Selsoviet of the town of oblast significance of Semyonov, 56°51′02″N 44°55′35″E
- Alexandrovka, Sergachsky District, Nizhny Novgorod Oblast, a village in Andreyevsky Selsoviet of Sergachsky District, 55°43′02″N 45°27′13″E
- Alexandrovka, Vorotynsky District, Nizhny Novgorod Oblast, a village in Alexandrovsky Selsoviet of Vorotynsky District, 55°53′18″N 45°58′39″E
- Alexandrovka, Voskresensky District, Nizhny Novgorod Oblast, a village in Vladimirsky Selsoviet of Voskresensky District, 56°51′02″N 45°06′52″E

=== Novosibirsk Oblast ===
Novosibirsk Oblast distribution map
Distribution of the inhabited localities called "Alexandrovka" in Novosibirsk Oblast

As of 2009, two rural localities in Novosibirsk Oblast bear this name:

- Alexandrovka, Bolotninsky District, Novosibirsk Oblast, a village in Bolotninsky District, 55°31′41″N 84°28′26″E
- Alexandrovka, Maslyaninsky District, Novosibirsk Oblast, a selo in Maslyaninsky District, 54°26′03″N 84°21′48″E

=== Omsk Oblast ===
Omsk Oblast distribution map
Distribution of the inhabited localities called "Alexandrovka" in Omsk Oblast

As of 2009, six rural localities in Omsk Oblast bear this name:

- Alexandrovka, Azovsky Nemetsky National District, Omsk Oblast, a selo in Alexandrovsky Rural Okrug of Azovsky Nemetsky National District, 54°33′35″N 72°45′17″E
- Alexandrovka, Kolosovsky District, Omsk Oblast, a village in Kraychikovsky Rural Okrug of Kolosovsky District, 56°12′47″N 73°17′16″E
- Alexandrovka, Maryanovsky District, Omsk Oblast, a village in Sharapovsky Rural Okrug of Maryanovsky District, 54°59′N 72°54′E
- Alexandrovka, Novovarshavsky District, Omsk Oblast, a selo in Yermakovsky Rural Okrug of Novovarshavsky District, 53°57′44″N 74°51′39″E
- Alexandrovka, Sargatsky District, Omsk Oblast, a village in Khokhlovsky Rural Okrug of Sargatsky District, 55°54′34″N 73°24′28″E
- Alexandrovka, Tevrizsky District, Omsk Oblast, a selo in Alexandrovsky Rural Okrug of Tevrizsky District, 57°34′55″N 73°02′36″E

=== Orenburg Oblast ===
As of 2009, nine rural localities in Orenburg Oblast bear this name:

- Alexandrovka, Akbulaksky District, Orenburg Oblast, a selo in Fyodorovsky Selsoviet of Akbulaksky District, 51°18′19″N 55°41′59″E
- Alexandrovka, Alexandrovsky District, Orenburg Oblast, a selo in Alexandrovsky Selsoviet of Alexandrovsky District, 52°40′44″N 54°24′58″E
- Alexandrovka, Asekeyevsky District, Orenburg Oblast, a village in Troitsky Selsoviet of Asekeyevsky District, 53°22′44″N 52°45′00″E
- Alexandrovka, Buzuluksky District, Orenburg Oblast, a selo in Krasnoslobodsky Selsoviet of Buzuluksky District, 53°09′51″N 52°25′53″E
- Alexandrovka, Grachyovsky District, Orenburg Oblast, a selo in Alexandrovsky Selsoviet of Grachyovsky District, 53°04′43″N 53°19′19″E
- Alexandrovka, Krasnogvardeysky District, Orenburg Oblast, a settlement in Kinzelsky Selsoviet of Krasnogvardeysky District, 52°36′25″N 53°14′53″E
- Alexandrovka, Matveyevsky District, Orenburg Oblast, a selo in Saray-Girsky Selsoviet of Matveyevsky District, 53°36′05″N 53°17′48″E
- Alexandrovka, Novosergiyevsky District, Orenburg Oblast, a selo in Platovsky Selsoviet of Novosergiyevsky District, 52°02′58″N 53°55′12″E
- Alexandrovka, Saraktashsky District, Orenburg Oblast, a selo in Cherkassky Selsoviet of Saraktashsky District, 51°48′41″N 56°17′34″E

=== Oryol Oblast ===
Oryol Oblast distribution map
Distribution of the inhabited localities called "Alexandrovka" in Oryol Oblast

As of 2009, fourteen rural localities in Oryol Oblast bear this name:

- Alexandrovka, Dolzhansky District, Oryol Oblast, a village in Kozma-Demyanovsky Selsoviet of Dolzhansky District, 52°00′55″N 37°35′29″E
- Alexandrovka, Ochkinsky Selsoviet, Glazunovsky District, Oryol Oblast, a village in Ochkinsky Selsoviet of Glazunovsky District, 52°26′27″N 36°21′17″E
- Alexandrovka, Senkovsky Selsoviet, Glazunovsky District, Oryol Oblast, a village in Senkovsky Selsoviet of Glazunovsky District, 52°21′31″N 36°11′47″E
- Alexandrovka, Karlovsky Selsoviet, Kolpnyansky District, Oryol Oblast, a village in Karlovsky Selsoviet of Kolpnyansky District, 52°17′54″N 37°02′35″E
- Alexandrovka, Znamensky Selsoviet, Kolpnyansky District, Oryol Oblast, a village in Znamensky Selsoviet of Kolpnyansky District, 52°10′01″N 36°57′39″E
- Alexandrovka, Korsakovsky Selsoviet, Korsakovsky District, Oryol Oblast, a village in Korsakovsky Selsoviet of Korsakovsky District, 53°16′50″N 37°25′08″E
- Alexandrovka, Novomikhaylovsky Selsoviet, Korsakovsky District, Oryol Oblast, a village in Novomikhaylovsky Selsoviet of Korsakovsky District, 53°05′49″N 37°18′31″E
- Alexandrovka, Maloarkhangelsky District, Oryol Oblast, a village in Leninsky Selsoviet of Maloarkhangelsky District, 52°27′56″N 36°30′59″E
- Alexandrovka, Novosilsky District, Oryol Oblast, a village in Prudovsky Selsoviet of Novosilsky District, 52°59′40″N 37°13′40″E
- Alexandrovka, Orlovsky District, Oryol Oblast, a village in Bolshekulikovsky Selsoviet of Orlovsky District, 52°53′29″N 36°24′07″E
- Alexandrovka, Danilovsky Selsoviet, Pokrovsky District, Oryol Oblast, a village in Danilovsky Selsoviet of Pokrovsky District, 52°36′29″N 36°47′38″E
- Alexandrovka, Topkovsky Selsoviet, Pokrovsky District, Oryol Oblast, a village in Topkovsky Selsoviet of Pokrovsky District, 52°23′45″N 37°03′08″E
- Alexandrovka, Gorodishchensky Selsoviet, Uritsky District, Oryol Oblast, a village in Gorodishchensky Selsoviet of Uritsky District, 52°55′31″N 35°38′56″E
- Alexandrovka, Podzavalovsky Selsoviet, Uritsky District, Oryol Oblast, a village in Podzavalovsky Selsoviet of Uritsky District, 53°04′59″N 35°34′56″E

=== Penza Oblast ===
Penza Oblast distribution map
Distribution of the inhabited localities called "Alexandrovka" in Penza Oblast

As of 2010, fifteen rural localities in Penza Oblast bear this name:

- Alexandrovka (selo), Yakovlevsky Selsoviet, Bekovsky District, Penza Oblast, a selo in Yakovlevsky Selsoviet of Bekovsky District, 52°40′45″N 43°35′43″E
- Alexandrovka (village), Yakovlevsky Selsoviet, Bekovsky District, Penza Oblast, a village in Yakovlevsky Selsoviet of Bekovsky District, 52°45′27″N 43°48′40″E
- Alexandrovka, Alexandrovsky Selsoviet, Bessonovsky District, Penza Oblast, a selo in Alexandrovsky Selsoviet of Bessonovsky District, 53°29′25″N 44°54′49″E
- Alexandrovka, Sosnovsky Selsoviet, Bessonovsky District, Penza Oblast, a village in Sosnovsky Selsoviet of Bessonovsky District, 53°18′08″N 45°15′02″E
- Alexandrovka, Gorodishchensky District, Penza Oblast, a village in Pavlo-Kurakinsky Selsoviet of Gorodishchensky District, 53°13′30″N 45°48′27″E
- Alexandrovka, Issinsky District, Penza Oblast, a village in Solovtsovsky Selsoviet of Issinsky District, 53°48′58″N 44°55′38″E
- Alexandrovka, Fedorovsky Selsoviet, Kamensky District, Penza Oblast, a selo in Fedorovsky Selsoviet of Kamensky District, 52°58′39″N 44°12′19″E
- Alexandrovka, Pokrovo-Archadinsky Selsoviet, Kamensky District, Penza Oblast, a village in Pokrovo-Archadinsky Selsoviet of Kamensky District, 53°05′21″N 44°17′00″E
- Alexandrovka, Maloserdobinsky District, Penza Oblast, a selo in Klyuchevsky Selsoviet of Maloserdobinsky District, 52°34′18″N 45°17′59″E
- Alexandrovka, Narovchatsky District, Penza Oblast, a village in Novopichursky Selsoviet of Narovchatsky District, 53°48′33″N 43°46′06″E
- Alexandrovka, Nikolsky District, Penza Oblast, a village in Ilminsky Selsoviet of Nikolsky District, 53°45′50″N 45°34′09″E
- Alexandrovka, Nizhnelomovsky District, Penza Oblast, a village in Golitsynsky Selsoviet of Nizhnelomovsky District, 53°39′21″N 43°57′26″E
- Alexandrovka, Salovsky Selsoviet, Penzensky District, Penza Oblast, a selo in Salovsky Selsoviet of Penzensky District, 53°09′09″N 44°48′11″E
- Alexandrovka, Voskresenovsky Selsoviet, Penzensky District, Penza Oblast, a village in Voskresenovsky Selsoviet of Penzensky District, 53°02′49″N 45°02′11″E
- Alexandrovka, Zemetchinsky District, Penza Oblast, a village in Morsovsky Selsoviet of Zemetchinsky District, 53°40′51″N 42°12′22″E

=== Primorsky Krai ===
Primorsky Krai location map
Location of Alexandrovka in Primorsky Krai

As of 2009, one rural locality in Primorsky Krai bears this name:

- Alexandrovka, Primorsky Krai, a selo in Spassky District, 44°46′44″N 132°57′19″E

=== Pskov Oblast ===
Pskov Oblast distribution map
Distribution of the inhabited localities called "Alexandrovka" in Pskov Oblast

As of 2009, three rural localities in Pskov Oblast bear this name:

- Alexandrovka (Polonskaya Rural Settlement), Porkhovsky District, Pskov Oblast, a village in Porkhovsky District; municipally a part of Polonskaya Rural Settlement of that district, 57°48′03″N 29°33′21″E
- Alexandrovka (Krasnoarmeyskaya Rural Settlement), Porkhovsky District, Pskov Oblast, a village in Porkhovsky District; municipally a part of Krasnoarmeyskaya Rural Settlement of that district, 57°41′00″N 29°42′15″E
- Alexandrovka, Pskovsky District, Pskov Oblast, a village in Pskovsky District, 57°42′32″N 28°55′14″E

=== Rostov Oblast ===
Rostov Oblast distribution map
Distribution of the inhabited localities called "Alexandrovka" in Rostov Oblast

As of 2009, four rural localities in Rostov Oblast bear this name:

- Alexandrovka, Aksaysky District, Rostov Oblast, a khutor in Mishkinskoye Rural Settlement of Aksaysky District, 47°19′34″N 40°00′10″E
- Alexandrovka, Azovsky District, Rostov Oblast, a selo in Alexandrovskoye Rural Settlement of Azovsky District, 46°47′04″N 38°59′36″E
- Alexandrovka, Matveyevo-Kurgansky District, Rostov Oblast, a selo in Alexeyevskoye Rural Settlement of Matveyevo-Kurgansky District, 47°38′06″N 38°47′27″E
- Alexandrovka, Tarasovsky District, Rostov Oblast, a sloboda in Yefremovo-Stepanovskoye Rural Settlement of Tarasovsky District, 48°47′43″N 40°51′23″E

=== Ryazan Oblast ===
Ryazan Oblast distribution map
Distribution of the inhabited localities called "Alexandrovka" in Ryazan Oblast

As of 2012, nine rural localities in Ryazan Oblast bear this name:

- Alexandrovka, Alexandro-Nevsky District, Ryazan Oblast, a village in Speshnevsky Rural Okrug of Alexandro-Nevsky District, 53°31′14″N 40°34′10″E
- Alexandrovka, Dudkinsky Rural Okrug, Chuchkovsky District, Ryazan Oblast, a village in Dudkinsky Rural Okrug of Chuchkovsky District, 54°11′22″N 41°34′00″E
- Alexandrovka, Tserlevsky Rural Okrug, Chuchkovsky District, Ryazan Oblast, a village in Tserlevsky Rural Okrug of Chuchkovsky District, 54°24′38″N 41°29′49″E
- Alexandrovka, Putyatinsky District, Ryazan Oblast, a village in Yekaterinovsky Rural Okrug of Putyatinsky District, 54°09′54″N 41°02′57″E
- Alexandrovka, Ryazhsky District, Ryazan Oblast, a selo in Nagornovsky Rural Okrug of Ryazhsky District, 53°43′20″N 39°58′36″E
- Alexandrovka, Pokrovsky Rural Okrug, Shatsky District, Ryazan Oblast, a village in Pokrovsky Rural Okrug of Shatsky District, 53°46′54″N 41°36′53″E
- Alexandrovka, Raypolsky Rural Okrug, Shatsky District, Ryazan Oblast, a village in Raypolsky Rural Okrug of Shatsky District, 53°59′04″N 41°25′32″E
- Alexandrovka, Shilovsky District, Ryazan Oblast, a village in Borovsky Rural Okrug of Shilovsky District, 54°21′33″N 41°11′41″E
- Alexandrovka, Ukholovsky District, Ryazan Oblast, a selo in Alexandrovsky Rural Okrug of Ukholovsky District, 53°51′27″N 40°37′01″E

=== Samara Oblast ===
Samara Oblast distribution map
Distribution of the inhabited localities called "Alexandrovka" in Samara Oblast

As of 2009, seven rural localities in Samara Oblast bear this name:

- Alexandrovka, Bezenchuksky District, Samara Oblast, a selo in Bezenchuksky District, 53°09′56″N 49°07′29″E
- Alexandrovka, Bolsheglushitsky District, Samara Oblast, a selo in Bolsheglushitsky District, 52°35′58″N 50°36′34″E
- Alexandrovka, Kinel-Cherkassky District, Samara Oblast, a selo in Kinel-Cherkassky District, 53°32′20″N 51°02′14″E
- Alexandrovka, Kinelsky District, Samara Oblast, a selo in Kinelsky District, 53°06′46″N 51°04′43″E
- Alexandrovka, Krasnoarmeysky District, Samara Oblast, a village in Krasnoarmeysky District, 52°35′57″N 50°05′36″E
- Alexandrovka, Pokhvistnevsky District, Samara Oblast, a selo in Pokhvistnevsky District, 53°42′36″N 51°33′39″E
- Alexandrovka, Stavropolsky District, Samara Oblast, a selo in Stavropolsky District, 53°21′16″N 49°28′17″E

=== Saratov Oblast ===
Saratov Oblast distribution map
Distribution of the inhabited localities called "Alexandrovka" in Saratov Oblast

As of 2009, fourteen rural localities in Saratov Oblast bear this name:

- Alexandrovka, Arkadaksky District, Saratov Oblast, a village in Arkadaksky District, 52°06′32″N 43°47′41″E
- Alexandrovka, Atkarsky District, Saratov Oblast, a village in Atkarsky District, 51°56′21″N 45°23′22″E
- Alexandrovka, Baltaysky District, Saratov Oblast, a village in Baltaysky District, 52°25′05″N 46°46′59″E
- Alexandrovka, Cherkasskoye, Saratov Oblast, a selo under administrative jurisdiction of the urban-type settlement of Cherkasskoye, 52°21′31″N 47°07′37″E
- Alexandrovka, Dukhovnitsky District, Saratov Oblast, a village in Dukhovnitsky District, 52°18′34″N 48°15′18″E
- Alexandrovka, Marksovsky District, Saratov Oblast, a selo in Marksovsky District, 51°45′47″N 46°56′26″E
- Alexandrovka, Novoburassky District, Saratov Oblast, a village in Novoburassky District, 52°11′52″N 45°58′18″E
- Alexandrovka, Rovensky District, Saratov Oblast, a selo in Rovensky District, 50°42′56″N 46°15′40″E
- Alexandrovka (selo), Rtishchevsky District, Saratov Oblast, a selo in Rtishchevsky District, 52°16′17″N 43°36′46″E
- Alexandrovka (village), Rtishchevsky District, Saratov Oblast, a village in Rtishchevsky District, 52°20′15″N 43°52′00″E
- Alexandrovka, Samoylovsky District, Saratov Oblast, a selo in Samoylovsky District, 51°17′20″N 44°02′39″E
- Alexandrovka, Saratovsky District, Saratov Oblast, a selo in Saratovsky District, 51°26′48″N 45°50′20″E
- Alexandrovka, Sovetsky District, Saratov Oblast, a selo in Sovetsky District, 51°15′46″N 46°51′10″E
- Alexandrovka, Yekaterinovsky District, Saratov Oblast, a village in Yekaterinovsky District, 52°18′44″N 44°25′10″E

=== Smolensk Oblast ===
As of 2008, six rural localities in Smolensk Oblast bear this name:

Smolensk Oblast distribution map
Distribution of the inhabited localities called "Alexandrovka" in Smolensk Oblast

- Alexandrovka, Khislavichsky District, Smolensk Oblast, a village in Khislavichsky District, 54°10′19″N 32°03′29″E
- Alexandrovka, Kholm-Zhirkovsky District, Smolensk Oblast, a village in Kholm-Zhirkovsky District, 55°36′04″N 33°18′56″E
- Alexandrovka, Monastyrshchinsky District, Smolensk Oblast, a village in Monastyrshchinsky District, 54°18′16″N 31°48′58″E
- Alexandrovka, Smolensky District, Smolensk Oblast, a village in Smolensky District, 54°45′21″N 31°59′12″E
- Alexandrovka, Sychevsky District, Smolensk Oblast, a village in Sychyovsky District, 55°56′21″N 34°06′46″E
- Alexandrovka, Ugransky District, Smolensk Oblast, a village in Ugransky District, 54°59′07″N 34°36′31″E

=== Sverdlovsk Oblast ===
As of 2009, one rural locality in Sverdlovsk Oblast bears this name.

=== Tambov Oblast ===
Tambov Oblast distribution map
Distribution of the inhabited localities called "Alexandrovka" in Tambov Oblast.

As of 2009, twenty rural localities in Tambov Oblast bear this name:

- Alexandrovka, Michurinsky District, Tambov Oblast, a village in Kochetovsky Selsoviet of Michurinsky District, 53°06′58″N 40°32′19″E
- Alexandrovka, Alexandrovsky Selsoviet, Mordovsky District, Tambov Oblast, a selo in Alexandrovsky Selsoviet of Mordovsky District, 51°56′10″N 40°52′21″E
- Alexandrovka, Ivanovsky Selsoviet, Mordovsky District, Tambov Oblast, a village in Ivanovsky Selsoviet of Mordovsky District, 52°22′02″N 40°45′54″E
- Alexandrovka, Algasovsky Selsoviet, Morshansky District, Tambov Oblast, a village in Algasovsky Selsoviet of Morshansky District, 53°38′21″N 41°41′35″E
- Alexandrovka, Veselovsky Selsoviet, Morshansky District, Tambov Oblast, a selo in Veselovsky Selsoviet of Morshansky District, 53°26′24″N 41°23′27″E
- Alexandrovka, Muchkapsky District, Tambov Oblast, a village in Zapolatovsky Selsoviet of Muchkapsky District, 51°46′32″N 42°11′06″E
- Alexandrovka, Yekaterininsky Selsoviet, Nikiforovsky District, Tambov Oblast, a selo in Yekaterininsky Selsoviet of Nikiforovsky District, 53°03′56″N 40°53′59″E
- Alexandrovka, Ozersky Selsoviet, Nikiforovsky District, Tambov Oblast, a selo in Ozersky Selsoviet of Nikiforovsky District, 52°46′01″N 40°56′19″E
- Alexandrovka, Petrovsky District, Tambov Oblast, a village in Volchkovsky Selsoviet of Petrovsky District, 52°33′33″N 40°39′06″E
- Alexandrovka, Rasskazovsky District, Tambov Oblast, a village in Ozersky Selsoviet of Rasskazovsky District, 52°31′37″N 42°04′25″E
- Alexandrovka, Kamensky Selsoviet, Rzhaksinsky District, Tambov Oblast, a village in Kamensky Selsoviet of Rzhaksinsky District, 52°08′17″N 41°47′26″E
- Alexandrovka, Volkhonshchinsky Selsoviet, Rzhaksinsky District, Tambov Oblast, a village in Volkhonshchinsky Selsoviet of Rzhaksinsky District, 51°59′26″N 41°46′27″E
- Alexandrovka, Sampursky District, Tambov Oblast, a village in Pervomaysky Selsoviet of Sampursky District, 52°08′49″N 41°33′00″E
- Alexandrovka, Sosnovsky Settlement Council, Sosnovsky District, Tambov Oblast, a village in Sosnovsky Settlement Council of Sosnovsky District, 53°19′48″N 41°24′14″E
- Alexandrovka, Verkhneyaroslavsky Selsoviet, Sosnovsky District, Tambov Oblast, a selo in Verkhneyaroslavsky Selsoviet of Sosnovsky District, 53°22′19″N 41°13′19″E
- Alexandrovka, Staroyuryevsky District, Tambov Oblast, a village in Vishnevsky Selsoviet of Staroyuryevsky District, 53°13′38″N 40°39′28″E
- Alexandrovka, Tambovsky District, Tambov Oblast, a village in Avdeyevsky Selsoviet of Tambovsky District, 52°40′23″N 40°53′07″E
- Alexandrovka, Tokaryovsky District, Tambov Oblast, a village in Alexandrovsky Selsoviet of Tokaryovsky District, 52°05′19″N 41°17′52″E
- Alexandrovka, Uvarovsky District, Tambov Oblast, a selo in Verkhneshibryaysky Selsoviet of Uvarovsky District, 52°01′39″N 42°27′08″E
- Alexandrovka, Znamensky District, Tambov Oblast, a selo in Alexandrovsky Selsoviet of Znamensky District, 52°16′50″N 41°21′46″E

=== Republic of Tatarstan ===
As of 2009, eight rural localities in the Republic of Tatarstan bear this name:

- Alexandrovka, Alexeyevsky District, Republic of Tatarstan, a village in Alexeyevsky District, 55°02′00″N 50°08′17″E
- Alexandrovka, Aznakayevsky District, Republic of Tatarstan, a village in Aznakayevsky District
- Alexandrovka, Bavlinsky District, Republic of Tatarstan, a selo in Bavlinsky District, 54°27′58″N 53°16′45″E
- Alexandrovka, Chistopolsky District, Republic of Tatarstan, a selo in Chistopolsky District, 55°21′N 50°47′E
- Alexandrovka, Kaybitsky District, Republic of Tatarstan, a settlement in Kaybitsky District, 55°19′10″N 47°50′40″E
- Alexandrovka, Leninogorsky District, Republic of Tatarstan, a settlement in Leninogorsky District, 54°38′34″N 52°28′59″E
- Alexandrovka, Pestrechinsky District, Republic of Tatarstan, a village in Pestrechinsky District, 55°37′40″N 49°50′58″E
- Alexandrovka, Sarmanovsky District, Republic of Tatarstan, a selo in Sarmanovsky District, 55°08′30″N 52°46′22″E

=== Tula Oblast ===
As of 2009, sixteen rural localities in Tula Oblast bear this name.

=== Tver Oblast ===
As of 2009, ten rural localities in Tver Oblast bear this name:

- Alexandrovka, Kalininsky District, Tver Oblast, a village in Kalininsky District
- Alexandrovka, Krasnokholmsky District, Tver Oblast, a village in Krasnokholmsky District
- Alexandrovka (former Gusevsky Rural Okrug), Oleninsky District, Tver Oblast, a village on the territory of former Gusevsky Rural Okrug of Oleninsky District; municipally a part of Gusevskoye Rural Settlement
- Alexandrovka (former Shizderovsky Rural Okrug), Oleninsky District, Tver Oblast, a village on the territory of former Shizderovsky Rural Okrug of Oleninsky District; municipally a part of Gusevskoye Rural Settlement
- Alexandrovka, Sonkovsky District, Tver Oblast, a village in Sonkovsky District
- Alexandrovka, Torzhoksky District, Tver Oblast, a village in Torzhoksky District
- Alexandrovka (Dyatlovskoye Rural Settlement), Vyshnevolotsky District, Tver Oblast, a village in Vyshnevolotsky District; municipally a part of Dyatlovskoye Rural Settlement of that district
- Alexandrovka (Solnechnoye Rural Settlement), Vyshnevolotsky District, Tver Oblast, a village in Vyshnevolotsky District; municipally a part of Solnechnoye Rural Settlement of that district
- Alexandrovka (Pogorelskoye Rural Settlement), Zubtsovsky District, Tver Oblast, a village in Zubtsovsky District; municipally a part of Pogorelskoye Rural Settlement of that district
- Alexandrovka (Ulyanovskoye Rural Settlement), Zubtsovsky District, Tver Oblast, a village in Zubtsovsky District; municipally a part of Ulyanovskoye Rural Settlement of that district

=== Tyumen Oblast ===
As of 2008, four rural localities in Tyumen Oblast bear this name:

- Alexandrovka, Sladkovsky District, Tyumen Oblast, a selo in Sladkovsky District
- Alexandrovka, Sorokinsky District, Tyumen Oblast, a village in Sorokinsky District
- Alexandrovka, Vikulovsky District, Tyumen Oblast, a village in Vikulovsky District
- Alexandrovka, Yarkovsky District, Tyumen Oblast, a village in Yarkovsky District

=== Ulyanovsk Oblast ===
As of 2008, seven rural localities in Ulyanovsk Oblast bear this name:

- Alexandrovka, Karsunsky District, Ulyanovsk Oblast, a village in Gorensky Rural Okrug of Karsunsky District
- Alexandrovka, Maynsky District, Ulyanovsk Oblast, a village in Ignatovsky Settlement Okrug of Maynsky District
- Alexandrovka, Melekessky District, Ulyanovsk Oblast, a selo in Ryazanovsky Rural Okrug of Melekessky District
- Alexandrovka, Novomalyklinsky Rural Okrug, Novomalyklinsky District, Ulyanovsk Oblast, a selo in Novomalyklinsky Rural Okrug of Novomalyklinsky District
- Alexandrovka, Vysokokolkovsky Rural Okrug, Novomalyklinsky District, Ulyanovsk Oblast, a settlement in Vysokokolkovsky Rural Okrug of Novomalyklinsky District
- Alexandrovka, Sursky District, Ulyanovsk Oblast, a selo in Nikitinsky Rural Okrug of Sursky District
- Alexandrovka, Tsilninsky District, Ulyanovsk Oblast, a village in Yelkhovoozersky Rural Okrug of Tsilninsky District

=== Vladimir Oblast ===
As of 2008, three rural localities in Vladimir Oblast bear this name:

- Alexandrovka (Anopino Rural Settlement), Gus-Khrustalny District, Vladimir Oblast, a village in Gus-Khrustalny District; municipally, in Anopino Rural Settlement of that district
- Alexandrovka (Ulyakhinskoye Rural Settlement), Gus-Khrustalny District, Vladimir Oblast, a village in Gus-Khrustalny District; municipally, in Ulyakhinskoye Rural Settlement of that district
- Alexandrovka, Muromsky District, Vladimir Oblast, a village in Muromsky District

=== Volgograd Oblast ===
As of 2009, five rural localities in Volgograd Oblast bear this name:

- Alexandrovka, Bykovsky District, Volgograd Oblast, a selo in Alexandrovsky Selsoviet of Bykovsky District
- Alexandrovka, Ilovlinsky District, Volgograd Oblast, a selo in Alexandrovsky Selsoviet of Ilovlinsky District
- Alexandrovka, Kamyshinsky District, Volgograd Oblast, a selo in Umetovsky Selsoviet of Kamyshinsky District
- Alexandrovka, Kikvidzensky District, Volgograd Oblast, a selo in Alexandrovsky Selsoviet of Kikvidzensky District
- Alexandrovka, Zhirnovsky District, Volgograd Oblast, a selo in Alexandrovsky Selsoviet of Zhirnovsky District

=== Vologda Oblast ===
As of 2009, one rural locality in Vologda Oblast bears this name.

=== Voronezh Oblast ===
As of 2008, thirteen rural localities in Voronezh Oblast bear this name:

- Alexandrovka, Anninsky District, Voronezh Oblast, a settlement in Novozhiznenskoye Rural Settlement of Anninsky District
- Alexandrovka, Ertilsky District, Voronezh Oblast, a selo in Alexandrovskoye Rural Settlement of Ertilsky District
- Alexandrovka, Novousmansky District, Voronezh Oblast, a selo in Otradnenskoye Rural Settlement of Novousmansky District
- Alexandrovka, Ostrogozhsky District, Voronezh Oblast, a khutor in Krinichenskoye Rural Settlement of Ostrogozhsky District
- Alexandrovka, Paninsky District, Voronezh Oblast, a selo in Martynovskoye Rural Settlement of Paninsky District
- Alexandrovka, Pavlovsky District, Voronezh Oblast, a selo in Alexandrovskoye Rural Settlement of Pavlovsky District
- Alexandrovka, Petropavlovsky District, Voronezh Oblast, a khutor in Novobogoroditskoye Rural Settlement of Petropavlovsky District
- Alexandrovka, Rossoshansky District, Voronezh Oblast, a selo in Alexandrovskoye Rural Settlement of Rossoshansky District
- Alexandrovka, Semiluksky District, Voronezh Oblast, a village in Troitskoye Rural Settlement of Semiluksky District
- Alexandrovka, Talovsky District, Voronezh Oblast, a selo in Alexandrovskoye Rural Settlement of Talovsky District
- Alexandrovka, Alexandrovskoye Rural Settlement, Ternovsky District, Voronezh Oblast, a selo in Alexandrovskoye Rural Settlement of Ternovsky District
- Alexandrovka, Kiselinskoye Rural Settlement, Ternovsky District, Voronezh Oblast, a settlement in Kiselinskoye Rural Settlement of Ternovsky District
- Alexandrovka, Verkhnekhavsky District, Voronezh Oblast, a selo in Alexandrovskoye Rural Settlement of Verkhnekhavsky District

=== Yaroslavl Oblast ===
As of 2008, three rural localities in Yaroslavl Oblast bear this name:

- Alexandrovka, Breytovsky District, a village in Filimonovsky Rural Okrug of Breytovsky District
- Alexandrovka, Rybinsky District, a village in Makarovsky Rural Okrug of Rybinsky District
- Alexandrovka, Uglichsky District, a village in Maymersky Rural Okrug of Uglichsky District

=== Zabaykalsky Krai ===
As of 2009, two rural localities in Zabaykalsky Krai bear this name.

== Distribution map ==
Distribution of inhabited localities called "Alexandrovka" by federal subject (as of 2009). Does not include localities which have "Alexandrovka" as a part of the name. none 1–2 3–5 6–10 11–15 16 or more

== Abolished inhabited localities ==
=== Modern Russia ===
- Alexandrovka, Burayevsky District, Republic of Bashkortostan, a village in Teplyakovsky Selsoviet of Burayevsky District of the Republic of Bashkortostan; abolished on August 5, 2005, 56°02′33″N 55°35′34″E
- Alexandrovka, Belinsky District, Penza Oblast, a village in Studensky Selsoviet of Belinsky District; abolished on October 22, 2011 53°01′40″N 42°56′46″E

=== Russian SFSR ===
- Alexandrovka, Meleuzovsky District, Bashkir ASSR, a village in Korneyevsky Selsoviet of Meleuzovsky District of the Bashkir ASSR; abolished on September 27, 1986

== See also ==
- Alexandrovka-1, name of several rural localities
- Alexandrovka-2, name of several rural localities
- Alexandrovka 3-ya, a selo in Kalininsky District of Saratov Oblast
- Alexandrovka Donskaya, a selo in Alexandro-Donskoye Rural Settlement of Pavlovsky District of Voronezh Oblast
- Belorus-Alexandrovka, a village in Lipovsky Selsoviet of Arkhangelsky District of the Republic of Bashkortostan
- Bolshaya Alexandrovka, name of several rural localities
- Konstantino-Alexandrovka, a village in Pervomaysky Selsoviet of Sterlitamaksky District of the Republic of Bashkortostan
- Kuzma-Alexandrovka, a village in Tabynsky Selsoviet of Gafuriysky District of the Republic of Bashkortostan
- Malaya Alexandrovka, name of several rural localities
- Mikhaylovo-Alexandrovka, a selo in Mikhaylovo-Alexandrovskoye Rural Settlement of Chertkovsky District of Rostov Oblast
- Nizhnyaya Alexandrovka, a selo in Mineralovodsky District of Stavropol Krai
- Novaya Alexandrovka, name of several rural localities
- Semyono-Alexandrovka, a selo in Semyono-Alexandrovskoye Rural Settlement of Bobrovsky District of Voronezh Oblast
- Severo-Alexandrovka, a village in Georgiyevsky Selsoviet of Kansky District of Krasnoyarsk Krai
- Spassko-Alexandrovka, a village in Volkhonshchinsky Selsoviet of Penzensky District of Penza Oblast
- Staraya Alexandrovka, name of several rural localities
- Tayozhno-Alexandrovka, a settlement in Tayozhno-Mikhaylovskaya Rural Territory of Mariinsky District of Kemerovo Oblast
- Verkhnyaya Alexandrovka, a settlement in Ust-Kabyrzinskaya Rural Territory of Promyshlennovsky District of Kemerovo Oblast
- Volchya Alexandrovka, a selo in Volchye-Alexandrovsky Rural Okrug of Volokonovsky District of Belgorod Oblast
- Yugo-Alexandrovka, a settlement in Arsentyevskaya Rural Territory of Kemerovsky District of Kemerovo Oblast
- Yuzhno-Alexandrovka, a selo in Yuzhno-Alexandrovsky Selsoviet of Ilansky District of Krasnoyarsk Krai
- Zarechye-Alexandrovka, a village in Lebyazhensky Selsoviet of Izmalkovsky District of Lipetsk Oblast
