= 246th Division =

246th Division may refer to:

- 246th Volksgrenadier Division, Wehrmacht, Germany
- 246th Rifle Division, Soviet Union

== See also ==
- List of military divisions by number
