= Mitrofan Pyatnitsky =

Russian and Soviet musician

Mitrofan Yefimovich Pyatnitsky Митрофан Ефимович Пятницкий
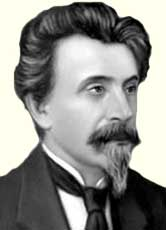

Background information
- Born: July 3, 1864; Alexandrovka, Russian Empire
- Died: January 27, 1927 (aged 62) Moscow, Soviet Union
- Occupations: Musician, gatherer of Russian folk songs

Mitrofan Yefimovich Pyatnitsky (Note: Russian: Митрофан Ефимович Пятницкий, romanized: Mitrofan Yefimovich Pyatnitsky, sometimes given as Mitrophan) (3 July [O.S. 21 June] 1864 – 21 January 1927) was a Russian and Soviet musician, gatherer of Russian folk songs. He established the famous Pyatnitsky Choir in 1910 from 18 peasants originally from the Voronezh, Ryazan and Smolensk gubernias. After his death, the chorus was named after him.
