= 246th Rifle Division =

246th Rifle Division (June 29, 1941 – July 1945)
- Active: 1941–1945
- Country: Soviet Union
- Branch: Red Army
- Type: Infantry
- Size: Division
- Engagements: Battle of Smolensk (1941); Battle of Moscow; Battles of Rzhev; Battle of Kursk; Battle of the Dniepr; Gomel-Rechitsa offensive Rovno–Lutsk offensive Proskurov–Chernovtsy offensive Lvov–Sandomierz offensive Vistula-Oder offensive Lower Silesian offensive Upper Silesian offensive Prague offensive
- Battle honours: Shumsk

Commanders
- Notable commanders: Maj. Gen. Ivan Ivanovich Melnikov; Lt. Col. Arsenii Timofeevich Rakcheev; Col. Grigorii Fyodorovich Malyukov; Col. Mikhail Georgievich Fedosenko; Col. Evgenii Grigorevich Ushakov; Maj. Gen. Dimitrii Leonidovich Kazarinov

The 246th Rifle Division was the third of a group of 10 regular rifle divisions formed from cadres of NKVD border and internal troops as standard Red Army rifle divisions, very shortly after the German invasion, in the Moscow Military District. It was largely based on what would become the shtat (table of organization and equipment) of July 29, 1941, with several variations. It was initially assigned to 31st Army, but was soon reassigned to 29th Army; this redeployment took some time and not long after arriving at the front the division was in full retreat. It served in the battles around Kalinin, partly in the rear of the German forces that took the city. During the winter counteroffensive west of Moscow it advanced west of Rzhev as part of Kalinin Front but became encircled with most of its Army and was forced to break out in late February, 1942 at the cost of heavy casualties. In the Rzhev-Sychyovka offensive that began at the end of July it took part in the liberation of Zubtsov in August but was stymied at the gates of Rzhev along with the rest of Western Front's forces. Early in the new year the 246th was transferred to the south and took part in the winter battles in the Kursk region as part of the 65th Army of Central Front, remaining there into and through the German summer offensive although it saw very little action. During the Soviet summer offensive the division advanced through northeastern Ukraine and into Belarus, taking part in the battles along the Dniepr and Sozh River in the vicinity of Gomel. In early December the 1st Ukrainian Front was struggling to hold its strategic bridgehead west of Kyiv and the 246th was transferred to this Front, where it remained until the last weeks of the war. In February 1944 it joined 60th Army, remaining under this command into the postwar. During the Proskurov–Chernovtsy Offensive in March it received a battle honor, which turned out to be its only divisional distinction. The division took part in the summer offensive that liberated Lviv and two of its regiments were given honors for their parts in this fighting. As the war advanced into Poland and Silesia in early 1945 the 246th was involved in heavy fighting for the latter region, especially the battle for Ratibor in late March. In the final weeks, 60th Army was transferred to 4th Ukrainian Front and the division was near Prague when the fighting ended. It was disbanded in July.

== Formation ==
The 246th Rifle Division began forming within days of the start of the German invasion on June 29, 1941, at Rybinsk, in the Moscow Military District. This was based on an NKVD order of that date:

In accordance with a decision of the USSR's government, the NKVD of the USSR is charged with forming fifteen rifle divisions [10 regular and 5 mountain].
1. Lieutenant General I. I. Maslennikov is entrusted with the task of forming fifteen rifle divisions of NKVD forces...
3. Begin forming and deploying the [following] divisions immediately: 243rd Rifle Division, 244th Rifle Division, 246th Rifle Division, 247th Rifle Division, 249th Rifle Division, 250th Rifle Division, 251st Rifle Division, 252nd Rifle Division, 254th Rifle Division, 256th Rifle Division...
4. To form the divisions designated above, assign 1,000 soldiers and non-commissioned officers and 500 command cadre from the NKVD's cadre to each division. Request the Red Army General Staff to provide the remainder of personnel by calling up all categories of soldiers from the reserves.
5. Complete concentrating the NKVD cadre at the formation regions by 17 July 1941...

Although the initial order for its formation came from the NKVD, when it left for the front in early July it was completely under Red Army administration. Its order of battle was as follows:

- 908th Rifle Regiment
- 914th Rifle Regiment
- 915th Rifle Regiment
- 777th Artillery Regiment
- 305th Antitank Battalion
- 326th Reconnaissance Company
- 415th Sapper Battalion
- 667th Signal Battalion (later 667th Signal Company)
- 265th Medical/Sanitation Battalion
- 247th Chemical Defense (Anti-gas) Company (later 245th)
- 63rd Auto Transport Company (later 464th Auto Transport Battalion, 468th Auto Transport Company)
- 310th Field Bakery (later 284th, 218th)
- 20th Divisional Veterinary Hospital (later 169th)
- 810th Field Postal Station
- 712th Field Office of the State Bank

Col. Ivan Ivanovich Melnikov, an NKVD officer, was appointed to command on July 4, and would be promoted to the rank of major general on July 15. He had been serving as head of the NKVD's Main Directorate of Border Troops. The division was assigned to the newly forming 31st Army on July 10 and officially entered the fighting front on July 20.

Judging from reports on other NKVD-based divisions, the 246th was far from complete when it entered combat. The commander of the 30th Army, Maj. Gen. V. A. Khomenko, reported on August 5 regarding his 250th and 251st Divisions that they had been required to move up to 350 km on foot to their concentration areas and "were taken from their assembly points in the very midst of assembly, and, incomplete, they did not approach being 'knocked together' and went into battle unprepared for combat." In addition, the 251st had only about 400 NKVD cadre soldiers.

== Battle of Smolensk ==
The 31st Army, commanded by Maj. Gen. V. N. Dalmatov, was initially composed of four NKVD divisions, the 244th, 246th, 247th and 249th. On July 30 the Reserve Front was formed, under command of Army Gen. G. K. Zhukov, and the Army, which now also included the 119th Rifle Division, was assigned to it. It was given responsibility for a line from the Moscow Sea to Kniazhi Gory to Shiparevo and Shchuche, with its headquarters at Rzhev. By this time the bulk of the remnants of 16th and 20th Armies had emerged from semi-encirclement near Smolensk.

=== Dukhovshchina Offensive ===
Marshal S. K. Timoshenko, commander of Western Front, began planning for a renewed effort toward Smolensk on August 14 which was intended to recapture Dukhovshchina en route to the city. The STAVKA ordered this to be coordinated with Zhukov's Reserve Front on August 17 in order to engulf the entire front from Toropets in the north to Bryansk in the south. In the event, due to the chaotic situation, Timoshenko was forced to conduct the operation in piecemeal fashion and was unable to establish close cooperation with Zhukov. In preparation for the offensive the 246th was transferred north to join General Maslennikov's 29th Army; delays in this movement forced Maslennikov to postpone kicking off his part in the offensive until August 19.

Timoshenko issued his first report on the operation to the STAVKA at about 1030 hours on August 17, in which his chief of staff reported:

246th RD was dispatched by 1000 hours on 17 August on 11 trains, of which 5 have been unloaded and 3 are still loading.

In a further report the next morning it was noted that one rifle regiment had arrived the previous day and was concentrating in Army reserve in the Turlachikha, Pichevakha and Mikhalevo region and that its remaining trains were continuing to arrive. In an operational summary issued at 2000 hours it was stated that, after unloading, the division was to concentrate in the Uste, Petugovo and Anashchiki region, 18 km north-northwest of Ilyino. At this time the Army headquarters was at Bentsy, 28 km north of the latter place. On August 20 Maslennikov began reporting German reinforcements arriving behind the left flank of their 9th Army; apparently gained by air reconnaissance these were likely forces of LVII Motorized Corps regrouping toward Velikiye Luki. Timoshenko, distracted by his successful actions in the 19th Army sector, even on August 21 failed to appreciate what his right wing forces would soon be facing. At 1745 hours he "somewhat caustically" directed Maslennikov to reorganize his offensive against 9th Army's left wing:

252nd RD, protected on the right, will attack from the Ust'e and Vypolzovo line toward Kozino and Il'ino, and 246th, together with 243rd RD, from the Baevo and Ias'kovo line in the general direction of Il'ino.

However, the next day the full extent of the effort against 22nd Army began to become clear. 29th Army attacked at 1400 but encountered strong resistance, and the division was reported as attacking from the Baevo region toward Andreevskie and Iurevo; no gains were noted. On August 23 the Army attempted to continue its attacks but by the end of the day unsettling news from the Velikiye Luki area was forcing Timoshenko to alter his plans significantly. At 1430, Maslennikov informed his own units that "at least an enemy panzer division has penetrated toward Velikie Luki from the west... a threat is being created to 22nd Army's rear and 29th Army's flank." He went on to state that the 246th and 243rd Divisions were attacking decisively southward toward Ilyino, and that a sniper company was protecting the Belianka Farm and Sevastianovo sectors. At 2000 Timoshenko reported much the same while also claiming that the two divisions had destroyed two German infantry battalions the previous day. On the following evening Western Front stated flatly that 22nd Army was "under attack by a large enemy force," while the 243rd and 246th persisted it its crawling advance on Ilyino, with the latter attacking German strongpoints on the outskirts of Trubniki and the forest to the south at 0800 hours after a half-hour artillery preparation, while its left wing cooperated with the 243rd's attack on Hill 209.6. The day's fighting cost 29th Army nearly 1,000 casualties. As the crisis developed Maslennikov was ordered to take control of 22nd Army's sector and he reported back at 0700 on August 25 that the 246th was still attempting to reach Ilyino and also was emplacing obstacles and mines on the roads leading from Lake Plovnoe to Mikhailovskoe, from Emlen across the Rovnyi Bor River, and several other junctions and roads. It was still 15 km east-northeast of Ilyino.

=== Retreat to Rzhev ===
On August 28 the 246th was defending, backed by the 6th Battery of the 644th Cannon Artillery Regiment, in positions including Beliankin Farm, Pavlova Luka and Trubniki from 12 km northeast of Ilyino to 13 km north-northeast. At this time the 3rd Panzer Group was making a determined effort to destroy 22nd Army near Toropets, and the 206th Infantry Division captured the isthmus between Lake Zhizhitskoye and Dvine, brushing the 252nd Division aside and entering the 29th Army's rear north of Ilyino. This forced both the 252nd and 246th to withdraw hastily to the northeast and east. Timoshenko and Maslennikov made every effort to restore some semblance of order on Western Front's right flank, but by now 22nd Army was a broken reed and only the scant forces of 29th Army or Front reserves could stem the German tide. On August 29 the 246th was transferred to a Composite Detachment under Colonel Antosenko to protect the Staraya Toropa region. Toropets fell on August 30 and the 246th was ordered to move from Staraya Toropa to the crossings over the Western Dvina River at Zheleznovo. As the situation swung wildly out of control, at 2100 hours on August 31 the division was directed to:

... reach the region south of Lake Griadetskoe by forced march along the Seliane, Koriakino, and Griadtsy... march-route, halt the enemy's offensive along the Toropets and Nelidovo highway, and, in the event of strong enemy pressure, hold on to the Lake Bol'shoe Moshno, Lake Griadetskoe and Lake Pesno line... to protect the arrival of the army's main forces along the Western Dvina River's eastern bank.

General Melnikov's command post was to be established in the woods northeast of Klin.

By September 2 the 246th was holding on to its positions in the defile between the lakes in the Solonkino, Kaliukhova, Glubokoe, Dorokhovo and Melnitsa sector, 15 km southwest of Zapadnaya Dvina, with two rifle regiments, and one regiment was preparing a defensive line in the Sotino and Barlovo sector, 5 km north to 5 km south of Zapadnaya Dvina, on the eastern bank of the Western Dvina. The next day the Front reported that the division's positions were unchanged, while it was coming under strong artillery and mortar fire. During September 4 the 246th defended its previous positions while other elements of 29th Army made marginal gains. It attempted to join the attack the next day with one rifle regiment engaged with as many as two German infantry battalions plus tanks in the vicinity Trofimovo in the defile between the lakes but withdrew part of this force to Zapenkove by 1300 hours.

At the end of September six of the armies of Western Front, now under command of Col. Gen. I. S. Konev, were occupying a defense in a sector 347 km wide along a line from Lake Seliger to west of Andreapol to Yartsevo to Yelnya. In case of the counterattacks' failures it was planned to fall back to the prepared rear army-level line of defense and continue the battle there.

Operation Typhoon began at 0530 hours on October 2 and the forces of 3rd Panzer Group and 9th Army soon penetrated along the boundary between 19th and 30th Armies. On the afternoon of October 5 the Chief of the General Staff, Marshal B. M. Shaposhnikov, summoned Konev to a telegraph machine for talks. Konev reported that the situation of the 22nd and 29th Armies was unchanged, and (erroneously) that the penetration of 30th Army had been held up. Shaposhnikov stated that his information indicated that "your situation at Belyi has become difficult." Konev replied that fighting at Bely was ongoing (in fact it had already fallen) and that Maslennikov had departed for there.

== Battle for Kalinin ==
By October 7 all was confusion on the Soviet side of the lines. Western Front was largely out of contact with its forces. Focused on cobbling together a force that could prevent the fall of Moscow, at 0200 hours on October 10 the STAVKA ordered seven rifle divisions pulled out of Western Front's right wing, including the 243rd and 246th from 29th Army. On the 12th it signalled Zhukov to retain these, plus the 5th, 133rd and 256th Divisions, for the defense of the Kalinin region. At this time the 243rd and 246th were waiting to detrain in Rzhev and march on Staritsa. Meanwhile, Army Group Center was trying to exploit eastwards, but was being held up by lack of supplies, ongoing resistance by the tattered Red Army, and the autumn rains. XXXXI Motorized Corps was ordered to capture Kalinin, and during October 8–14 ground its way forward to take the city. Along the way the Corps' 1st Panzer Division rolled into Staritsa at 1500 on October 12 and may or may not have captured the Volga River bridge there. At 1800 hours on October 14 this division reported that it had cleared the center of Kalinin.

The German hold on the city was tenuous, and the panzers were expected to continue their advance toward the northwest along the Torzhok road. The next day Maslennikov spelled out his orders to his divisions. The northern group, with 246th, 252nd and 119th Rifle Divisions, was to assemble in the Brody area, cross the Volga at Akishevo, and attack en echelon on a front of no more than 750–1,000m towards Ryazanovo, 16 km south of Kalinin, for a total distance of 29 km. The 246th was to lead, reinforced by 432nd Howitzer Regiment and a battery of 85mm antitank guns from 873rd Antitank Regiment. The plan was detailed, ambitious, and ultimately unsuccessful, despite the German artillery defending at Staritsa having run completely out of ammunition. In addition, the division's 914th Rifle Regiment was repeatedly bombed while assembling at Akishevo.

Overnight on October 16/17 Konev came up with a much more ambitious plan. Maslennikov was now to cross the Volga with five divisions, including the 246th, some 15 km south-southwest of Kalinin and from there link up with 30th Army, which was supposed to be attacking toward the city from the southeast, thus cutting off XXXXI Corps. The division got its 914th Regiment, commanded by Maj. A. P. Krutikhin, across at Akishevo, despite a lack of assault boats, without significant opposition, and quickly emplaced two assault bridges. The 915th Regiment began to follow it across, at which point the river began to rise dramatically, from 1m deep the night before to 2.2m. The men of the division speculated that German forces upstream had blown a dam. This appears unlikely as the flooding washed out a German bridge under construction at Staritsa as well as both bridges emplaced by the 914th. The men of 777th Artillery Regiment tried to build rafts but were unable to get their guns across. That evening, in an effort to rationalize command and control in the region, the STAVKA decreed the creation of Kalinin Front, under Konev's command, including 22nd, 29th and 30th Armies, plus the Operational Group under Lt. Gen. N. F. Vatutin.

The same evening, Maslennikov visited the proposed crossing site and ordered the operation halted. He then disregarded his orders from Konev and directed most of the 246th plus three other divisions (119th, 243rd, 252nd) to move north on the west bank of the river to cut the road between Kalinin and Marino. The 914th remained on the east bank to advance on Kalinin, as Konev had intended for the entire force. During October 17 the regiment gave XXXXI Corps no end of trouble. It seized Redkino, just west of the Staritsa–Kalinin road, cutting one of the two German supply routes northward into the city. While the German command understood they faced only a regimental group, they had only weak forces to contain it. The 6th Infantry Division was ordered to send a regiment from Staritsa. It was to eliminate the 914th's bridgehead and then cross to the west bank at Staritsa and move northeast along the Volga to the Tma River. Fighting between two German battalions and the 914th continued through October 18. The next day the regiment was reported as having been "driven into the Volga", but the war diary 3rd Panzer Group correctly noted that it had actually retreated toward Kalinin, which at least eased the German supply situation somewhat.

Meanwhile, the main body of Maslennikov's four divisions were counterattacking the forces of 1st Panzer Division and the 900th Lehr Brigade, which had been advancing northwest of Kalinin on the Torzhok road. 1st Panzer's Battlegroup von Heydebrand was under heavy attack from the southwest by two regiments (identified as from 246th Division but more likely from 252nd or 119th Division). On the morning of October 20 the 900th Lehr was encircled near Mednoye by 243rd Division in conjunction with 185th Rifle Division attacking from the north. This brigade, with minimal fuel and ammunition, was ordered to abandon Mednoye and fight its way out between the road and the Tma River; this turned out to be the first Soviet soil to be permanently liberated during the war. By the end of the day, XXXXI Corps conceded that no further advance toward Torzhok was currently possible, and that its forces would have to withdraw to Kalinin. On the same day the 246th was reported as being in "quite satisfactory condition" with a total fighting strength of about 60 percent of establishment.

Late on October 20 the XXXXI Corps reported that the 914th Regiment's bridgehead had been disposed of by 6th Infantry Division, although "the escape of some of the enemy on the eastern bank in a northeast direction must be assumed." This assumption was correct, and the regiment very likely was resupplied and able to evacuate its wounded across the Volga once it broke contact with 6th Infantry. During the night it emerged from the woods and captured the village of Motavino. Continuing to push east it then took Krasnovo, less than 5 km from the vital German-held airfield at Migalovo; attacking without artillery support the leading battalion suffered up to 50 percent casualties. The German priority on October 21 was to rescue as much of 1st Panzer as possible. Meanwhile, Konev was still looking to a "large solution" of striking across the Volga into the rear of XXXXI Corps and encircling it entirely. This would require a 180 degree turn and countermarch over heavily muddy roads and was impractical at best. As part of this plan the 119th Division shifted south and crossed the Volga with three battalions in support of the 914th Regiment.

Konev was determined to carry out a concentric attack to finally surround and liberate Kalinin beginning on October 23. Maslennikov's role was to cross the Volga and seal off the city from the south, but due to transfers and detachments he had left only the 246th and 119th Divisions to accomplish this. The 915th Regiment marched to Khvastovo and made an unopposed crossing on October 22 which was slowed by the fact that only two pontoons and a small number of boats were available. It came under air attack at dawn and took all day to get across, finishing by 2000 hours, after which the 777th Artillery began crossing. The 908th Regiment had assumed defensive positions facing south on a 10 km-wide front. After taking Krasnovo, Major Krutikhin was joined by a Major Rozov of the 777th to coordinate artillery support for the 914th. As a result, at 1020 hours the headquarters of 3rd Panzer Group received a call for help from 8th Air Corps at Migalovo airfield reporting that they were under artillery fire. No immediate response could be provided as 1st Panzer Division's artillery had just escaped the encirclement north of the Volga. Later counterbattery fire from other sources was able to temporarily silence the Soviet guns, but not before four aircraft had been damaged. In addition, the 1st Panzer's distribution point for fuel that had been flown in had to be evacuated.

During the afternoon the 914th Regiment came under attack by German infantry, backed by two tanks and several armored halftracks of 1st Panzer. The 915th Regiment had been contained in its bridgehead and was unable to intervene. Striking the 2nd Battalion defending on the regiment's right flank the German grouping broke into the soviet positions, producing wholesale panic. One group of German infantry pursued and broke into Krasnovo, where the regimental headquarters was located. Major Krutikhin led the headquarters' personnel in a counterattack and with the help of another battalion destroyed part of the German force and drove off the rest. But the regiment was clearly shaken and was left clinging to a shallow bridgehead on the east bank.

By now more German infantry was beginning to arrive in the Kalinin area, which disrupted the plan to take the city, in part, from the south. Maslennikov was forced, on October 24, to divert his 243rd and 183rd Divisions, with the 54th Cavalry Division, to hold back the advance of 9th Army's forces. A dawn attack by 915th Regiment drove through Talutino and into Danilovskoye in house-to-house fighting, only to be beaten back out of the town by a counterattack by two battalions of the 161st Infantry Division plus elements of the 129th Infantry Division with tank support. The 915th also sent elements through the woods east of Khvastovo and attacked Deveshkino where they ran into the German 620th Heavy Artillery Battalion. This battle came to hand-to-hand combat but the Red Army men were driven back into the woods. That night a renewed attack by the regiment retook both villages. During the day the 914th at Krasnovo was hit hard and, after three hours fighting was forced to withdraw to Motavino, 1.5 km to the west. During this fighting the chief of staff of the 777th Artillery, Major Kortikov, was mortally wounded.

Bitter fighting raged on in the Danilovskoye area for days, during which the town repeatedly changed hands. On October 26 Kalinin Front reported to the STAVKA that between them the 119th and 246th Divisions had destroyed eight German tanks and three "tankettes" (almost certainly PzKpfw Is), two armored cars and 86 trucks and had captured another 30 vehicles with fuel and equipment, five guns, six light and two heavy machine guns and counted over 300 German dead on the field. The following day General Melnikov claimed over 350 casualties, plus 26 trucks, five cars and two tanks. However, on October 28 a combined force from 161st Infantry, 1st Panzer and 14th Motorized Division launched a determined attack on the Soviet defenses that forced the two divisions and 46th Cavalry Division to gradually withdraw toward the Volga. Faced with this reality, on October 30 Maslennikov authorized all three divisions to recross to the west bank. He reported to Konev:

During the six days of active offensive operations, 246th Rifle Division, reinforced by one regiment of 243rd Rifle Division and one dismounted regiment of 46th Cavalry Division, the expected success was not achieved. Four times Danilovskoye was in our grasp, but we could not hold it... In reserve we had only 150-170 bayonets.

Kalinin would be liberated on December 19, the first major city freed from Nazi Germany. At the end of November the 246th had 6,800 personnel on hand as it prepared for the winter counteroffensive.

== Battles of Rzhev ==
At the start of January, 1942 the 29th Army had five divisions, including the 246th, under command, and was being led by Maj. Gen. V. I. Shvetsov. On January 8 the first Rzhev-Vyazma offensive began with a total of 14 armies of Kalinin and Western Fronts involved. Kalinin Front led the attack with 29th and 39th Armies forming its shock group. 29th Army soon began to envelop Rzhev from the west, reaching as close as 8km to the city by January 11. The STAVKA ordered Konev that it be taken the following day, but despite reinforcements the effort fell short.

On January 21–22 the German forces southwest and west of Vyazma went over to the attack. The immediate aim was to free the German troops encircled in the Olenino area and the close the gap through which supplies were flowing to 29th and 39th Armies and the 11th Cavalry Corps. The gap was closed on January 23 and the two armies now had only a narrow corridor between Nelidovo and Bely for communications with the Front. Realizing the danger of the situation Konev ordered 30th Army westward to attempt to reopen the gap. However, further German attacks on February 5 broke communications between 39th and 29th Armies and the latter was now completely encircled. 30th Army made repeated efforts to break through the German defenses near Nozhkino and Kokoshkino; at times only 3–4km remained to reach the encircled units, which were striving to break out to the north. By mid-month Konev had ordered Shvetsov "to withdraw in the general direction of Stupino", to the southwest toward 39th Army. He was further ordered "to bring out the troops in an organized fashion; if it is impossible to bring out the artillery, heavy machine guns and mortars, to bury such equipment in the woods." The units of 29th Army began to trickle out of encirclement to link up with 39th Army on the night of February 17 and continued for the next several days. By February 28 5,200 men had come out of the pocket, 800 of which were wounded. The Army's losses between January 16 and February 28 amounted to 14,000 men.

Among the casualties was General Melnikov, who was wounded and captured on February 28. He remained in German hands for the duration of the war. He was arrested upon his return to the USSR in late May 1945, but was soon cleared of any wrongdoing before being sent to the Frunze Military Academy. From 1947 to 1954 he served as head of the Military Department of the Moscow Agricultural Academy, and then retired. He died in June 1972, a few days before his 80th birthday. The 246th was taken over on March 2 by Lt. Col. Arsenii Timofeevich Rakcheev. The 29th Army was largely refitted by early April.

=== First Rzhev–Sychyovka Offensive ===
At the end of July the 29th Army was quite small, with just four rifle divisions (5th, 246th, 274th, 369th) and an independent cavalry regiment. It was deployed west of the Volga, near the northeast tip of the Rzhev salient on Kalinin Front's left flank. A STAVKA directive of July 16 designated it as part of the attacking force that was to seize the cities of Rzhev and Zubtsov. According to Soviet intelligence the Army had "overwhelming superiority" in infantry and artillery over the German units it faced.

Kalinin Front's part of the offensive began on July 30 with a powerful artillery preparation which silenced the German artillery. Heavy rains began that morning which soon turned the roads into quagmires and flooded the many small streams in the area. While 30th Army managed to gain up to 6–7 km the 29th Army failed to penetrate the German lines. An after-action report stated:

In view of the heavily saturated soil after the downpours, the tank became mired, and the infantry became pinned down... The rallied infantry advanced again and ran into enemy firing positions that opened up a withering fire; as a result the infantry suffered heavy losses and became pinned down again in a zone beaten by enemy artillery and mortar fire. The offensive sputtered to a halt.

The weather also forced Western Front to delay its part in the offensive until August 4. On August 19 Lt. Col. Rakcheev was replaced in command of the 246th by Col. Grigorii Fyodorovich Malyukov, who had previously led the 82nd Cavalry Division of 11th Cavalry Corps. Only after August 20 were some successes achieved. Divisions of 30th Army finally liberated the village of Polunino on August 21 while units of 29th Army reached the Volga between Rzhev and Zubtsov. A joint attack by 29th and 31st Armies liberated the latter city on August 23. After a brief regrouping, at 0530 hours on August 24 elements of 30th Army resumed the offensive north and east of Rzhev while the 29th Army went on the attack south of the city. Despite every effort these attacks failed; on August 29 the two Armies were transferred to Western Front, which was now under command of General Konev. On September 5 he proposed suspending the attack until the infantry was rested and replenished, artillery ammunition was brought up and tanks were repaired. At dawn on September 8 the 29th Army "went on a determined offensive... with the mission to seize the southern part of Rzhev." The attack was suspended again on September 16 but resumed on September 21. A combat journal of the 246th recorded on that date:

The division after an artillery preparation went on the attack at 0945 toward Point [illegible]... After two attacks, overcoming barrier fire and enemy counterattacks, units of the division reached a line north of the village by 1000. Regiments' losses... 908th - 171 killed and wounded, 915th - 59 killed, 82 wounded, altogether 453 men.

Rzhev remained in German hands and on September 25 the 29th Army went over to the defense. During August and September it lost 16,267 killed, wounded and missing. During October the division was moved to 31st Army, still in Western Front, and on November 9 Colonel Malyukov was sent to study at the Voroshilov Academy; he would later command the 32nd Cavalry and 216th Rifle Divisions and would be promoted to the rank of major general on May 16, 1944. He was replaced by Maj. Mikhail Georgievich Fedosenko. This officer was in turn replaced on December 8 by Col. Pyotr Lukyanovich Mishchenko, but this was a short assignment as Col. Evgenii Grigorevich Ushakov took over on December 23. Ushakov had previously commanded the 57th Guards Rifle Regiment of 20th Guards Rifle Division. 31st Army played mostly a supporting role in Operation Mars during this period after its initial efforts to penetrate the German defenses failed.

== Battle of Kursk ==
During January 1943 the 246th was withdrawn into the reserves of Western Front. It was originally to be sent to Northwestern Front, but a directive of the STAVKA on February 5 ordered the establishment of a new Central Front by February 15 under command of Col. Gen. K. K. Rokossovskii, and the 246th was one of the divisions assigned to it. Within days, Rokossovskii had assigned the division to his 65th Army. The plan for the Army was to hold at Ponyri while attacking westward beginning on February 24, ultimately advancing on Roslavl.

Despite strenuous efforts to ensure timely regrouping and concentration of Central Front's forces into their assembly areas and jumping-off positions for the offensive, persistent poor weather and deteriorating road conditions caused delay. The advance of Army Group South toward Kharkiv was an additional complication. Early on February 24 the position of the division was reported:

The 246th Rifle Division - was concentrated in the Nikol'skoe and Man'shino (12 kilometres northeast of Zolotukhino) region at the end of 23 February and is continuing to march to the Belyi Kolodez' (incl.), Radogoshch, and Chermoshnoe region.

The ongoing German offensive disrupted all plans and greatly stressed the Soviet formations. The 65th Army's commander, Lt. Gen. P. I. Batov, acknowledged the deterioration of discipline in an order he issued on March 25, including, "During the first half of March 1943 alone, 22 men have been exposed and judged as self-mutilators in the 246th Rifle Division alone, of which the largest portion have appeared in the 908th Rifle Regiment."

On June 6 Colonel Ushakov took command of 37th Guards Rifle Division, which was also in 65th Army. He would be promoted to the rank of major general in September and ended the war in command of the 101st Guards Rifle Division. He was replaced by now-Lt. Colonel Fedosenko, who would be made a full colonel on August 21. During June the 246th was subordinated to the 18th Rifle Corps, still in 65th Army.

At the outset of Operation Zitadelle the 65th Army was deployed on an 82km frontage along the western face of the Kursk salient between the 60th and 70th Armies of Central Front and facing the German XIII Army Corps of 2nd Army. In the German plan for the operation no attacks were to be made on this sector. 65th Army had nine rifle divisions, with six, including all of 18th Corps, in first echelon, and the remaining three in second echelon.

== Into Ukraine and Belarus ==
In the event the 65th Army did not join the summer offensive until Operation Kutuzov was nearly concluded and Operation Polkhovodets Rumyantsev was well underway. Central Front struck 2nd Army's center at Sevsk and east flank at Klintsy on August 26. At this time the 246th was serving as a separate division under direct Army command. The Front's forces quickly broke the German line with 60th Army in the lead. On September 2 the XIII Corps was ordered to fall back to the west and maintain contact with Army Group South, but instead was pushed south across the Seym River into the 4th Panzer Army sector, thereby opening a 30 km wide gap between Army Groups South and Center. The following day, 2nd Army withdrew to the Desna River as Rokossovskii paused to regroup. On September 9 the Front's forces forced this river south of Novhorod-Siverskyi and at Otsekin.

Central Front liberated Nizhyn on the Oster River on September 15, which finally triggered the OKH to order a full withdrawal to the Dniepr. Over the next five days the Front staged a two-pronged thrust northward on either side of Chernihiv which collapsed the flank of 2nd Army, allowing it to advance north toward Gomel. As of October 1 the 246th had been reassigned to 18th Corps.

=== Gomel-Rechitsa Offensive ===
By this time the entire 65th Army had reached the Sozh River between the mouth of the Iput River and Loyew; on September 28 the 354th Rifle Division had seized a bridgehead at Novaya Tereshkovichi. The Army was deployed with 18th Corps on its left (south) flank north of Loyew. Although the Army continued to gain small bridgeheads over the Sozh, General Batov realized he would have to orchestrate a full-scale attack to enlarge these bridgeheads and force the Germans to abandon Gomel. The main effort would come from the 354th's lodgement, which had already been reinforced, while his 18th and 27th Rifle Corps were to conduct supporting attacks farther to the south.

On October 1 three divisions attacked the German 6th Infantry Division's positions from Novaya Tereshkovichi, and having breached them, fanned out to liberate the villages of Noyve and Starye Diatlovichi in heavy fighting. After expanding the bridgehead to a depth of 4 km the attack was contained by arriving reserves from 2nd Army. Meanwhile, five divisions of the 18th and 27th Corps, including the 246th, assaulted across the Sozh and seized several shallow bridgeheads but these were soon sealed off by further German reserves. Within days, 65th Army's attacks had bogged down on this sector, and the offensive towards Gomel was temporarily halted. Realizing there was no sense in trying again to crack the German defenses in the narrow belt between the Sozh and Dniepr, from October 8–14 Rokossovskii carried out a major regrouping to the south, into the sector on the Dniepr south of Loyew held by 61st Army. The 246th and 354th Divisions were moved into second echelon.

On October 15 the attack by the Front's left wing forced a passage across the Dniepr south of Loyew and gained ground fast; by October 20 (when the Front was renamed Belorussian Front) the Soviet forces had carved out a bridgehead 90 km wide and 16 km deep across the Dniepr, and went on to try to cut the rail line from Rechitsa to Gomel. In order to sustain this advance Batov had already been ordered to reinforce the bridgehead with the 354th and 246th Divisions, and they were accordingly re-subordinated to the 27th Rifle Corps. This bridgehead was also reinforced with the 9th Tank and 7th Guards Cavalry Corps. They faced three extremely worn-down divisions of the German XX Army Corps. On October 24, the divisions of 27th Corps punched a 5 km-wide breach in the positions of 102nd Infantry Division south of Lipniaki, into which Batov committed the 2nd Guards Cavalry Corps. Only an intervention by a battle group of 2nd Panzer Division contained it. Heavy fighting raged for more than a week until 2nd Army was forced to begin a phased withdrawal to new positions in the rear. By October 28, 27th Corps had advanced another 15–20 km, as much as 23 km northwest of Loyew, linking up with the advancing forces of 61st Army, but the forces of both armies had by now "shot their bolt", and a halt was called on October 30.

Over the next ten days Belorussian Front carried out another regrouping to continue the offensive and encircle and destroy the German Rechitsa-Gomel grouping. 65th Army remained in the center of the Front's main attack sector, with 27th Corps on its right wing. The 246th was in the second echelon, along with the 106th Rifle Division. The Corps' mission was:

... to penetrate the enemy defense in the Bushatin region (a sector of 4 kilometres), destroy the opposing enemy in their strongholds, and capture Hill 131.6 and the village of Prokisel (at a depth of 6 kilometers).

The order went on to set further objectives. The offensive reopened on November 10, and in the first two days the 27th and 19th Rifle Corps had carved out a penetration which was then exploited into the Germans' operational rear by 1st Tank and 7th Guards Cavalry Corps. On November 13, 27th Corps, with the assistance of elements of the tank Corps, captured Demekhi, 12 km west of Rechitsa, cutting the German rail line to that city from the west. The Corps then led a wheeling movement to the northwest, attempting to reach the Berezina River south of Parichi. By nightfall on November 20 the Corps was approaching Vasilkov, 25 km northwest of Rechitsa, and on the same day the Germans faced reality and withdrew from the city, which was liberated by elements of 42nd Rifle Corps. By this point, the offensive had unhinged all of Army Group Center's defenses in southern Belorussia, and Soviet forces were exploiting into a 20 km-wide gap.

Before the end of November the 246th was transferred to 48th Army, still in Belorussian Front, where it came under direct Army command. On December 9 the STAVKA ordered Rokossovskii to transfer six divisions, starting with the 140th, 149th and 246th, to 1st Ukrainian Front, which had liberated Kyiv and was defending a large strategic bridgehead against strong German counterattacks. The 246th was dispatched by December 15; it would remain in this Front for the duration of the war.

=== Proskurov–Chernovtsy Offensive ===
By the start of January 1944 the division had been assigned to 28th Rifle Corps in 13th Army. Under these commands it took part in the Rovno–Lutsk offensive. During the month 28th Corps left 13th Army and came under direct command of the Front, but in February it was subordinated to 60th Army. The 246th would remain in this Army for the duration.

1st Ukrainian Front launched its part of the Proskurov–Chernovtsy Offensive on March 4 and on the second day the division was awarded a battle honor:

SHUMSK - ...246th Rifle Division (Colonel Fedosenko, Mikhail Georgievich)... The troops who participated in the liberation of Shumsk and other cities, by the order of the Supreme High Command of 5 March 1944, and a commendation in Moscow, are given a salute of 20 artillery salvoes from 224 guns.

60th Army continued its advance in the direction of Proskuriv, which Hitler had declared a "fortress" on March 8; the city was liberated on March 25. By now the 1st Panzer Army had been encircled and the remainder of the campaign, which continued until April 17, largely revolved on the efforts to break this encirclement, which eventually succeeded.

=== Lvov–Sandomierz Offensive ===
In the planning for a new offensive the 60th Army commander, Col. Gen. P. A. Kurochkin, assigned his 15th and 28th Rifle Corps to the main task of driving westward to Lviv in conjunction with the 3rd Guards Tank Army, while the 23rd Corps was to attack in the general direction of Sokolovka to encircle and destroy the German forces in the Brody area. The 15th and 28th Corps were concentrated on a 4 km-wide sector and were to penetrate the German defense from the grove of trees north of Trostianets to Bzovitsa and develop the attack in the general direction Sokolovka and Lviv. The operation began with reconnaissance actions on July 13, and the shock groups went over to the attack at 1600 hours the next day; the 28th and 15th Corps fought along the line from Perepelniki to Oleiouv. On July 15 the 28th Corps repelled infantry and tank counterattacks while fighting along a line from Na-Zasliaiiakh to Oleiouv. By this time the Army's lead forces had wedged to a depth of 14–16 km into the German defenses and the following morning the 3rd Guards Tank was committed into the breach.

By now the German forces, recognizing their deteriorating position, were attempting to both withdraw to the west and to counterattack to restore their lines. The Army's forces advanced almost 12 km on July 16 and 28th Corps reached from Ivanuv to Yaroslavitse. During July 17 the Army's right flank and center forces gained another 6–8 km. During the following day the 28th Corps continued beating off counterattacks by up to a battalion of infantry and 10-11 tanks at a time and reached the northern outskirts of Volchkovtse to Yaroslavitse. On July 27 the 60th Army launched a decisive attack on the city of Lviv with the 23rd Corps advancing from the north, the 28th Corps from the east, and the 106th Rifle Corps from the southeast, all in support of the 4th Tank Army which had followed 3rd Guards Tank into 60th Army's breach and was already fighting within the city. The city was liberated the same day and the 908th Rifle Regiment (Major Pavlov, Pyotr Ivanovich) received its name as an honorific. On August 10 the 914th Rifle Regiment would receive the Order of the Red Banner for its part in the fighting.

Before the end of July the 246th was transferred to 106th Corps. On October 17 Colonel Fedosenko left the division and was replaced by Col. Dimitrii Leonidovich Kazarinov, who had been serving as chief of staff of 28th Corps. This officer would lead the division into the postwar and was promoted to the rank of major general just before it was disbanded.

== Into Germany and Czechoslovakia ==
Before the end of the year the division returned to 28th Corps. During the Vistula-Oder Offensive 60th Army began a deep exploitation to the west, through southern Poland, and on January 26, 1945, the Corps drove off German rearguards on the approaches to the Auschwitz concentration camp, which was liberated the next day by the 322nd Rifle Division.

=== Lower Silesian Offensive ===
This offensive began on February 8, with the goal of capturing Breslau and advancing to the Neisse River. 60th Army occupied a 76 km-wide front from Schoenblick to Goczalkowice on the Front's left wing. All three of the Army's rifle corps were deployed in the first echelon; 28th Corps had the 246th and 302nd Rifle Divisions in first echelon with the 322nd in second. Both 60th and 59th Armies were in a bridgehead over the Oder River north of Ratibor, and faced significant German forces for this period of the war. As a result, the two Armies made only minor gains in the first days of the offensive and soon went over to the defense. In the regrouping that followed the division was removed from 28th Corps and came under direct Army command.

=== Upper Silesian Offensive ===
The Front commander, Marshal Konev, completed the Lower Silesian offensive by February 24, after which he began laying plans for a new offensive into upper Silesia. Upon the arrival of his Front's main group of forces in the Neisse area the 59th and 60th Armies were to develop the attack from the bridgehead north of Ratibor to the west and southwest. Ultimately this operation would encircle and destroy the German group of forces in the Oppeln salient. At this time the personnel strength of the Army's divisions had been reinforced to a strength of from 4,500 to 5,000 men and women. The Army commander, Col. Gen. P. A. Kurochkin, planned to lead his attack with the 28th Corps on a 4 km-wide front, with the 15th Corps to be introduced once a breach was made. The 246th was to secure the left flank of these two Corps.

The offensive on the 59th and 60th Army's sector began at 0850 hours on March 15 following an 80-minute artillery preparation, and went largely according to plan although more slowly than expected. The main German defense zone was broken through on a 12 km front and the Armies advanced 6–8 km during the day. Bad weather prevented air support before noon, and the advancing forces also had to repel ten counterattacks. In response Konev ordered that the advance continue through the night. During the day on March 16 the 60th Army managed to advance another 4 km and the following day, having repelled 13 German counterattacks, overcame the entire tactical depth of the defense in a 13 km advance, seized Konigsdorf and advanced right up to Leobschutz. Konev personally visited the 60th Army headquarters on the 17th and demanded that Kurochkin reinforce the left flank of the Army's attacking troops with artillery, the 152nd Tank Brigade and independent self-propelled artillery regiments, as well as second echelon formations to develop the offensive toward Ernau and Biskau. On March 18 the Army encountered a previously prepared line from Hoenplotz to Leobschutz to Ernau and gained only 2–7 km. Despite this, by the end of the day a link up with 21st Army was made in the Elgut area. The encircled Oppeln grouping consisted of the 20th SS, 168th and 344th Infantry Divisions, part of the 18th SS Panzergrenadier Division, and several independent regiments and battalions.

==== Battle for Ratibor ====
At about this time the 246th returned to 15th Rifle Corps. During March 19–20 60th Army's forces, while supporting 59th Army's efforts to destroy the Oppeln grouping, prepared to fulfil its earlier mission of defeating the German Ratibor grouping prior to reaching the line of the Opava River. For this purpose it was reinforced with the 5th Guards Mechanized Corps and the 17th Breakthrough Artillery Division. 28th Corps was to launch the main attack in conjunction with units of 5th Guards Mechanized and 31st Tank Corps to capture Leobschutz and Biskau by the end of the first day, while 15th Corps committed only a single right-flank division while the remaining divisions would attack on the second day southward toward Ratibor. The Army faced four German infantry divisions, a panzergrenadier division battle group, nine independent infantry battalions and a tank battalion, for a total of 130 tanks and assault guns.

At 0850 hours on March 22, following an artillery preparation, the Army's right-flank forces began their offensive. The German forces put up stubborn resistance with fire and counterattacks by small groups of infantry and tanks. On the first day the Soviet forces advanced no more than 8 km. The next day elements of the 8th and 17th Panzer Divisions were committed, considerably reducing the Soviet advantage in armor. A total of 11 counterattacks were launched, each by up to a battalion of infantry and up to 15 tanks or self-propelled guns. The intensity of these counterstrokes held 15th Corps in check, even with its entire strength committed, and this continued into March 24. By this time the defense had been penetrated to a maximum depth of 15 km and Leobschutz had been taken.

Examining the situation, Konev considered that the 60th Army was not capable of carrying out its task alone, and decided to commit the 10th Guards Tank Corps of 4th Guards Tank Army, which was no longer needed in support of 21st Army. The joint offensive began on March 25 but still failed to be decisive, in part because 10th Guards Tanks was considerably understrength, and the German forces held advantageous terrain. Stubborn fighting continued through March 31, with heavy casualties on both sides. Meanwhile, on March 24 the 38th Army of 4th Ukrainian Front began attacking in the direction of Moravian Ostrava, and within days had advanced to a point where the German Ratibor grouping was faced with encirclement. The 106th Rifle Corps entered the attack on March 26 and soon captured Rybnik. In preparation for the storming of Ratibor the Red Air Force launched massed bomber strikes amounting to about 2,000 sorties during March 29–30. In addition, the 25th Breakthrough Artillery Division was moved in to supplement the 17th Division. Early on the morning of March 31 all the artillery in the area opened fire on the German forces, which were defending the outskirts of the town. Following this preparation the 15th and part of 106th Corps began the decisive attack and by 1000 hours Ratibor was cleared. By April 1 the 60th and 4th Guards Tank Armies had reached the line Bleichwitz–Steuberwitz–Berendorf where they halted and consolidated.

== Postwar ==
In late April the entire 60th Army was transferred to 4th Ukrainian Front for the final campaign against the German forces around Prague, and the 246th returned to 28th Corps. On May 28 the 915th Rifle Regiment was awarded the Order of Suvorov, 3rd Degree, for its part in the liberation of Opava on April 22. According to STAVKA Order No. 11097 of May 29, 1945, parts 5 and 8, the 60th Army was to be transferred to the Northern Group of Forces in Poland, and the 246th is listed as one of the rifle divisions to be "disbanded in place". It was disbanded in accordance with the directive in July 1945.
