= Belorus-Alexandrovka =

Belorus-Alexandrovka Белорус-Александровка
- Village
- Location within Bashkortostan Location within Russia
- Coordinates: 54°33′N 56°39′E
- Country: Russia
- Region: Bashkortostan
- District: Arkhangelsky District
- Time zone: UTC+5:00

Belorus-Alexandrovka (Russian: Белорус-Александровка) is a rural locality (a village) in Lipovsky Selsoviet, Arkhangelsky District, Bashkortostan, Russia. The population was 86 as of 2010. There is 1 street.

== Geography ==
Belorus-Alexandrovka is located 28 km north of Arkhangelskoye (the district's administrative centre) by road. Novoshareyevo is the nearest rural locality.
