= Alexandrovka, Kugarchinsky District, Republic of Bashkortostan =

Alexandrovka Александровка
- Selo
- Location within Bashkortostan Location within Russia
- Coordinates: 52°53′N 56°20′E
- Country: Russia
- Region: Bashkortostan
- District: Kugarchinsky District
- Time zone: UTC+5:00

Alexandrovka (Russian: Александровка) is a rural locality (a selo) in Yumaguzinsky Selsoviet, Kugarchinsky District, Bashkortostan, Russia. The population was 367 as of 2010. There are 2 streets.

== Geography ==
Alexandrovka is located 37 km northwest of Mrakovo (the district's administrative centre) by road. Yumaguzino is the nearest rural locality.
