= Alexandrovka, Blagoveshchensky District, Altai Krai =

Alexandrovka Александровка
- Settlement
- Location within Altai Krai Location within Russia
- Coordinates: 52°54′N 80°35′E
- Country: Russia
- Region: Altai Krai
- District: Blagoveshchensky District
- Time zone: UTC+7:00

Alexandrovka (Russian: Александровка) is a rural locality (a settlement) in Alexeyevsky Selsoviet, Blagoveshchensky District, Altai Krai, Russia. The population was 40 as of 2013. There is 1 street.

== Geography ==
Alexandrovka is located 61 km east of Blagoveshchenka (the district's administrative centre) by road. Alexeyevka is the nearest rural locality.
