= Cherkasskoye =

Cherkasskoe
- Location in Kazakhstan
- Coordinates: 45°40′04″N 80°22′02″E
- Country: Kazakhstan
- Region: Jetisu Region
- District: Sarkand District
- Elevation: 2,346 ft (715 m)
- Time zone: UTC+6 (Omsk Time)

Cherkasskoye is a village in Jetisu Region of south-eastern Kazakhstan. Cherkasskoye is located near the Lepsi River.
