= Alexandrovka, Ertilsky District, Voronezh Oblast =

Alexandrovka Александровка
- Selo
- Location within Voronezh Oblast Location within Russia
- Coordinates: 51°40′N 41°01′E
- Country: Russia
- Region: Voronezh Oblast
- District: Ertilsky District
- Time zone: UTC+3:00

Alexandrovka (Russian: Александровка) is a rural locality (a selo) and the administrative center of Alexandrovskoye Rural Settlement, Ertilsky District, Voronezh Oblast, Russia. The population was 402 as of 2010. There are 12 streets.

== Geography ==
Alexandrovka is located on the Tokay River, 46 km south of Ertil (the district's administrative centre) by road. Verkhnyaya Maza is the nearest rural locality.
