= Alexandrovka, Loktevsky District, Altai Krai =

Alexandrovka Александровка
- Selo
- Location within Altai Krai Location within Russia
- Coordinates: 51°08′N 81°41′E
- Country: Russia
- Region: Altai Krai
- District: Loktevsky District
- Time zone: UTC+7:00

Alexandrovka (Russian: Александровка) is a rural locality (a selo) in Alexandrovsky Selsoviet, Loktevsky District, Altai Krai, Russia. The population was 394 as of 2013. There are 9 streets.

== Geography ==
Alexandrovka is located on the Aley River, 33 km northeast of Gornyak (the district's administrative centre) by road. Pavlovka is the nearest rural locality.
