= Alexandrovka, Volokonovsky District, Belgorod Oblast =

Alexandrovka Александровка
- Selo
- Location within Belgorod Oblast Location within Russia
- Coordinates: 50°25′N 37°58′E
- Country: Russia
- Region: Belgorod Oblast
- District: Volokonovsky District
- Time zone: UTC+3:00

Alexandrovka (Russian: Александровка) is a rural locality (a selo) in Volokonovsky District, Belgorod Oblast, Russia. The population was 117 in 2010. There are two streets.

== Geography ==
Alexandrovka is located 18 km southeast of Volokonovka (the district's administrative centre) by road. Golofeyevka is the nearest rural locality.
