= Alexandrovka, Birsky District, Republic of Bashkortostan =

Alexandrovka Александровка
- Khutor
- Location within Bashkortostan Location within Russia
- Coordinates: 55°24′N 55°16′E
- Country: Russia
- Region: Bashkortostan
- District: Birsky District
- Time zone: UTC+5:00

Alexandrovka (Russian: Александровка) is a rural locality (a khutor) in Kusekeyevsky Selsoviet, Birsky District, Bashkortostan, Russia. The population was 4 as of 2010. There is 1 street.

== Geography ==
Alexandrovka is located 41 km west of Birsk (the district's administrative centre) by road. Novourtayevo is the nearest rural locality.
