= Alexandrovka, Beloretsky District, Republic of Bashkortostan =

Alexandrovka Александровка
- Village
- Location within Bashkortostan Location within Russia
- Coordinates: 54°17′N 57°35′E
- Country: Russia
- Region: Bashkortostan
- District: Beloretsky District
- Time zone: UTC+5:00

Alexandrovka (Russian: Александровка) is a rural locality (a village) in Inzersky Selsoviet, Beloretsky District, Bashkortostan, Russia. The population was 11 as of 2010. There is 1 street.

== Geography ==
Alexandrovka is located 107 km northwest of Beloretsk (the district's administrative centre) by road. Nizhnyaya Tyulma is the nearest rural locality.
