= Alexandrovka, Tuymazinsky District, Republic of Bashkortostan =

Alexandrovka Александровка
- Village
- Location within Bashkortostan Location within Russia
- Coordinates: 54°32′N 54°00′E
- Country: Russia
- Region: Bashkortostan
- District: Tuymazinsky District
- Time zone: UTC+5:00

Alexandrovka (Russian: Александровка) is a rural locality (a village) in Kandrinsky Selsoviet, Tuymazinsky District, Bashkortostan, Russia. The population was 62 in 2010. There is one street. It is located 31 km southeast of Tuymazy (the district's administrative centre) by road. Pervomayskoye is the nearest rural locality.
