= Alexandrovka, Chishminsky District, Republic of Bashkortostan =

Alexandrovka Александровка
- Village
- Location within Bashkortostan Location within Russia
- Coordinates: 54°29′N 55°23′E
- Country: Russia
- Region: Bashkortostan
- District: Chishminsky District
- Time zone: UTC+5:00

Alexandrovka (Russian: Александровка) is a rural locality (a village) in Novotroitsky Selsoviet, Chishminsky District, Bashkortostan, Russia. The village has 2 streets and, as of 2010, a population of 29.

== Geography ==
Alexandrovka is located 26 km south of Chishmy, the district's administrative seat. Kuchumovo is the nearest rural locality.
