= Alexandrovka, Buzovyazovsky Selsoviet, Karmaskalinsky District, Republic of Bashkortostan =

Alexandrovka Александровка
- Selo
- Location within Bashkortostan Location within Russia
- Coordinates: 54°17′N 55°54′E
- Country: Russia
- Region: Bashkortostan
- District: Karmaskalinsky District
- Time zone: UTC+5:00

Alexandrovka (Russian: Александровка) is a rural locality (a selo) in Buzovyazovsky Selsoviet, Karmaskalinsky District, Bashkortostan, Russia. The population was 174 as of 2010.

== Geography ==
It is located 20 km from Karmaskaly and 6 km from Buzovyazy.
