= Semyono-Alexandrovka =

Semyono-Alexandrovka Семёно-Александровка
- Selo
- Location within Voronezh Oblast Location within Russia
- Coordinates: 51°02′N 40°12′E
- Country: Russia
- Region: Voronezh Oblast
- District: Bobrovsky District
- Time zone: UTC+3:00

Semyono-Alexandrovka (Russian: Семёно-Александровка) is a rural locality (a selo) and the administrative center of Semyono-Alexandrovskoye Rural Settlement, Bobrovsky District, Voronezh Oblast, Russia. The population was 1,772 as of 2010. There are 14 streets.

== Geography ==
Semyono-Alexandrovka is located 22 km southeast of Bobrov (the district's administrative centre) by road. Annovka is the nearest rural locality.
