= Alexandrovka, Amur Oblast =

Alexandrovka Александровка
- Selo
- Location within Amur Oblast Location within Russia
- Coordinates: 53°35′N 126°57′E
- Country: Russia
- Region: Amur Oblast
- District: Zeysky District
- Time zone: UTC+9:00

Alexandrovka (Russian: Александровка) is a rural locality (a selo) in Nikolayevsky Selsoviet of Zeysky District, Amur Oblast, Russia. The population was 171 as of 2018. There are 4 streets.

== Geography ==
Alexandrovka is located 39 km southwest of Zeya (the district's administrative centre) by road. Ovsyanka is the nearest rural locality.
