= Alexandrovka, Suyetsky District, Altai Krai =

Alexandrovka Александровка
- Selo
- Location within Altai Krai Location within Russia
- Coordinates: 53°13′N 80°12′E
- Country: Russia
- Region: Altai Krai
- District: Suyetsky District
- Time zone: UTC+7:00

Alexandrovka (Russian: Александровка) is a rural locality (a selo) and the administrative center of Aleksandrovsky Selsoviet, Suyetsky District, Altai Krai, Russia. The population was 502 as of 2013. There are 5 streets.

== Geography ==
Alexandrovka is located 16 km southeast of Verkh-Suyetka (the district's administrative centre) by road. Ukrainsky is the nearest rural locality.
