= Alexandrovka, Davlekanovsky District, Republic of Bashkortostan =

Alexandrovka Александровка
- Village
- Location within Bashkortostan Location within Russia
- Coordinates: 54°18′N 54°46′E
- Country: Russia
- Region: Bashkortostan
- District: Davlekanovsky District
- Time zone: UTC+5:00

Alexandrovka (Russian: Александровка) is a rural locality (a village) in Alginsky Selsoviet, Davlekanovsky District, Bashkortostan, Russia. The population was 233 as of 2010. There are 6 streets.

== Geography ==
Alexandrovka is located 22 km northwest of Davlekanovo (the district's administrative centre) by road. Romanovka is the nearest rural locality.
