= Kuzma-Alexandrovka =

Kuzma-Alexandrovka Кузьма-Александровка
- Village
- Location within Bashkortostan Location within Russia
- Coordinates: 53°57′N 56°21′E
- Country: Russia
- Region: Bashkortostan
- District: Gafuriysky District
- Time zone: UTC+5:00

Kuzma-Alexandrovka (Russian: Кузьма-Александровка) is a rural locality (a village) in Tabynsky Selsoviet, Gafuriysky District, Bashkortostan, Russia. The population was 1 as of 2010. There is 1 street.

== Geography ==
Kuzma-Alexandrovka is located 13 km northwest of Krasnousolsky (the district's administrative centre) by road. Tabynskoye is the nearest rural locality.
