= Alexandrovka, Kikvidzensky District, Volgograd Oblast =

Alexandrovka Александровка
- Selo
- Location within Volgograd Oblast Location within Russia
- Coordinates: 51°03′N 43°12′E
- Country: Russia
- Region: Volgograd Oblast
- District: Kikvidzensky District
- Time zone: UTC+4:00

Alexandrovka (Russian: Александровка) is a rural locality (a selo) in Yezhovskoye Rural Settlement, Kikvidzensky District, Volgograd Oblast, Russia. The population was 446 as of 2010. There are 8 streets.

== Geography ==
Alexandrovka is located on Khopyorsko-Buzulukskaya plain, 55 km northeast of Preobrazhenskaya (the district's administrative centre) by road. Polotskoye is the nearest rural locality.
