= Alexandrovka, Kalmansky District, Altai Krai =

Alexandrovka Александровка
- Settlement
- Location within Altai Krai Location within Russia
- Coordinates: 53°03′N 83°24′E
- Country: Russia
- Region: Altai Krai
- District: Kalmansky District
- Time zone: UTC+7:00

Alexandrovka (Russian: Александровка) is a rural locality (a settlement) in Novoromanovsky Selsoviet, Kalmansky District, Altai Krai, Russia. The population was 159 as of 2013. There are 2 streets.

== Geography ==
Alexandrovka is located 20 km northwest of Kalmanka (the district's administrative centre) by road. Novoromanovo is the nearest rural locality.
