= Alexandrovka, Ilovlinsky District, Volgograd Oblast =

Alexandrovka Александровка
- Selo
- Location within Volgograd Oblast Location within Russia
- Coordinates: 49°34′N 44°18′E
- Country: Russia
- Region: Volgograd Oblast
- District: Ilovlinsky District
- Time zone: UTC+4:00

Alexandrovka (Russian: Алекса́ндровка) is a rural locality (a selo) and the administrative center of Alexandrovskoye Rural Settlement, Ilovlinsky District, Volgograd Oblast, Russia. In 2010, the population was 855. There are seven streets.

== Geography ==
Alexandrovka is located in steppe, on the left bank of the Ilovlya River, on the Volga Upland, 44 km northeast of Ilovlya (the district's administrative centre) by road. Stefanidovka is the nearest rural locality.
