= Alexandrovka, Bakalinsky District, Republic of Bashkortostan =

Alexandrovka Александровка
- Village
- Location within Bashkortostan Location within Russia
- Coordinates: 55°06′N 53°29′E
- Country: Russia
- Region: Bashkortostan
- District: Bakalinsky District
- Time zone: UTC+5:00

Alexandrovka (Russian: Александровка) is a rural locality (a village) in Buzyurovsky Selsoviet, Bakalinsky District, Bashkortostan, Russia. The population was 49 as of 2010. There are 2 streets.

== Geography ==
Alexandrovka is located 28 km southwest of Bakaly (the district's administrative centre) by road. Kholodny Klyuch is the nearest rural locality.
