= Alexandrovka, Rossoshansky District, Voronezh Oblast =

Alexandrovka Александровка
- Selo
- Location within Voronezh Oblast Location within Russia
- Coordinates: 49°59′N 39°24′E
- Country: Russia
- Region: Voronezh Oblast
- District: Rossoshansky District
- Time zone: UTC+3:00

Alexandrovka (Russian: Александровка) is a rural locality (a selo) and the administrative center of Alexnadrovskoye Rural Settlement, Rossoshansky District, Voronezh Oblast, Russia. The population was 536 as of 2010. There are 13 streets.

== Geography ==
Alexandrovka is located 32 km southeast of Rossosh (the district's administrative centre) by road. Yelenovka is the nearest rural locality.
