= Alexandrovka, Zavyalovsky District, Altai Krai =

Alexandrovka Александровка
- Settlement
- Location within Altai Krai Location within Russia
- Coordinates: 52°41′N 80°41′E
- Country: Russia
- Region: Altai Krai
- District: Zavyalovsky District
- Time zone: UTC+7:00

Alexandrovka (Russian: Александровка) is a rural locality (a settlement) in Chernavsky Selsoviet, Zavyalovsky District, Altai Krai, Russia. The population was 231 as of 2013. There are 3 streets.

== Geography ==
Alexandrovka is located on the Kulunda plain, 39 km southwest of Zavyalovo (the district's administrative centre) by road. Chernavka and Kamyshenka are the nearest rural localities.
