= Alexandrovka, Konyshyovsky District, Kursk Oblast =

Rural locality in Kursk Oblast, Russia

Alexandrovka Александровка
- Khutor
- Interactive map of Alexandrovka
- Location of Alexandrovka Alexandrovka (Kursk Oblast)
- Coordinates: 51°56′48″N 35°12′46″E
- Country: Russia
- Federal subject: Kursk Oblast
- Administrative district: Konyshyovsky District
- SelsovietSelsoviet: Naumovsky

Population (2010 Census)
  - Total: 6
  - Estimate (2010): 6 (0%)

Municipal status
  - Municipal district: Konyshyovsky Municipal District
  - Rural settlement: Naumovsky Selsoviet Rural Settlement
- Time zone: UTC+3 (MSK)
- Postal code: 307613
- Dialing code: +7 47156
- OKTMO ID: 38616432131
- Website: naumovsky.ru

Alexandrovka (Russian: Александровка) is a rural locality (a khutor) in Naumovsky Selsoviet Rural Settlement, Konyshyovsky District, Kursk Oblast, Russia. Population: 6 (2010 census); 12 (2002 census);

== Geography ==
The khutor is located on the Chmacha River (a left tributary of the Svapa River), 56.5 km (35.1 mi) from the Russia–Ukraine border, 71 km (44 mi) north-west of Kursk, 12 km (7.5 mi) north-west of the district center – the urban-type settlement Konyshyovka, 3.5 km (2.2 mi) from the selsoviet center – Naumovka.

Climate

Alexandrovka has a warm-summer humid continental climate (Dfb in the Köppen climate classification).

== Transport ==
Alexandrovka is located 50 km (31 mi) from the federal route M-3 Ukraine Highway, 44.5 km (27.7 mi) from the route M-2 Crimea Highway, 28 km (17 mi) from the route A-142 (Trosna – M3 highway), 13 km (8.1 mi) from the road of regional importance 38K-038 (Fatezh – Dmitriyev), 9 km (5.6 mi) from the road 38K-005 (Konyshyovka – Zhigayevo – 38K-038), 15 km (9.3 mi) from the road 38K-003 (Dmitriyev – Beryoza – Menshikovo – Khomutovka), 1.5 km (0.93 mi) from the road of intermunicipal significance 38Н-467 (Mashkino – railway station Sokovninka near the settlement of the same name – Naumovka), 2 km (1.2 mi) from the nearest railway halt 543 km (railway line Navlya – Lgov-Kiyevsky).

The rural locality is situated 76.5 km (47.5 mi) from Kursk Vostochny Airport, 172 km (107 mi) from Belgorod International Airport and 277 km (172 mi) from Voronezh Peter the Great Airport.
