= Alexandrovka, Znamensky District, Tambov Oblast =

Alexandrovka Александровка
- Selo
- Interactive map of Alexandrovka
- Location of Alexandrovka Alexandrovka (Tambov Oblast)
- Coordinates: 52°16′50″N 41°21′46″E
- Country: Russia
- Federal subject: Tambov Oblast
- Administrative district: Znamensky District
- Selsoviet: Alexandrovsky
- Founded: 1816

Population
  - Estimate (2010): 624 )

Administrative status
  - Capital of: Alexandrovsky Selsoviet

Municipal status
  - Municipal district: Znamensky Municipal District
  - Rural settlement: Alexandrovsky Rural Settlement
  - Capital of: Alexandrovsky Rural Settlement
- Time zone: UTC+3 (MSK)
- Postal code: 393424
- OKTMO ID: 68606405101

Alexandrovka (Russian: Алекса́ндровка) is a rural locality (a selo) in Alexandrovsky Selsoviet of Znamensky District of Tambov Oblast, Russia.

The village was founded in 1816 when sisters Zagryazhskys, landed estate owners, moved 366 serfs to this location from their votchina in Znamenka.

== Sources ==
- Тамбовская областная Дума. Закон №72-З от 21 июня 1996 г. «Об административно-территориальном устройстве Тамбовской области», в ред. Закона №544-З от 11 июня 2015 г. «О внесении изменений в статью 7 Закона Тамбовской области "Об административно-территориальном устройстве Тамбовской области"». Опубликован: "Тамбовская жизнь", №131, 1996 г. (Tambov Oblast Duma. Law #72-Z of June 21, 1996 On the Administrative-Territorial Structure of Tambov Oblast, as amended by the Law #544-Z of June 11, 2015 On Amending Article 7 of the Law of Tambov Oblast "On the Administrative-Territorial Structure of Tambov Oblast". ).
- Тамбовская областная Дума. Закон №232-З от 17 сентября 2004 г. «Об установлении границ и определении места нахождения представительных органов муниципальных образований в Тамбовской области», в ред. Закона №606-З от 7 декабря 2015 г. «О внесении изменений в Закон Тамбовской области "Об установлении границ и определении места нахождения представительных органов муниципальных образований в Тамбовской области"». Вступил в силу со дня официального опубликования. Опубликован: "Тамбовская жизнь", №185 (23125). (Tambov Oblast Duma. Law #232-Z of September 17, 2004 On Establishing the Borders and Determining the Location of the Representative Organs of the Municipal Formations of Tambov Oblast, as amended by the Law #606-Z of December 7, 2015 On Amending the Law of Tambov Oblast "On Establishing the Borders and Determining the Location of the Representative Organs of the Municipal Formations of Tambov Oblast". Effective as of the official publication date.).
