= Alexandrovka, Kamyshinsky District, Volgograd Oblast =

Alexandrovka Александровка
- Selo
- Location within Volgograd Oblast Location within Russia
- Coordinates: 50°19′N 45°23′E
- Country: Russia
- Region: Volgograd Oblast
- District: Kamyshinsky District
- Time zone: UTC+4:00

Alexandrovka (Russian: Александровка) is a rural locality (a selo) in Umyotovskoye Rural Settlement, Kamyshinsky District, Volgograd Oblast, Russia. The population was 21 as of 2010. There are 2 streets.

== Geography ==
Alexandrovka is located in forest steppe, on the Volga Upland, on the left bank of the Ilovlya River, 36 km north of Kamyshin (the district's administrative centre) by road. Umet is the nearest rural locality.
