= Alexandrovka, Anninsky District, Voronezh Oblast =

Alexandrovka Александровка
- Settlement
- Location within Voronezh Oblast Location within Russia
- Coordinates: 51°20′N 40°50′E
- Country: Russia
- Region: Voronezh Oblast
- District: Anninsky District
- Time zone: UTC+3:00

Alexandrovka (Russian: Александровка) is a rural locality (a settlement) in Novozhiznenskoye Rural Settlement, Anninsky District, Voronezh Oblast, Russia. The population was 120 as of 2010.

== Geography ==
Alexandrovka is located 41 km southeast of Anna (the district's administrative centre) by road. Gusevka 2nd is the nearest rural locality.
