= Alexandrovka, Kamyshlinsky Selsoviet, Karmaskalinsky District, Republic of Bashkortostan =

Alexandrovka Александровка
- Selo
- Location within Bashkortostan Location within Russia
- Coordinates: 54°11′N 56°19′E
- Country: Russia
- Region: Bashkortostan
- District: Karmaskalinsky District
- Time zone: UTC+5:00

Alexandrovka (Russian: Александровка) is a rural locality (a selo) in Kamyshlinsky Selsoviet, Karmaskalinsky District, Bashkortostan, Russia. The population was 188 as of 2010.

== Geography ==
It is located 27 km from Karmaskaly and 5 km from Kamyshlinka.
