= Alexandrovka, Karaidelsky District, Republic of Bashkortostan =

Alexandrovka Александровка
- Selo
- Location within Bashkortostan Location within Russia
- Coordinates: 55°31′N 56°57′E
- Country: Russia
- Region: Bashkortostan
- District: Karaidelsky District
- Time zone: UTC+5:00

Alexandrovka (Russian: Александровка) is a rural locality (a selo) in Kirzinsky Selsoviet, Karaidelsky District, Bashkortostan, Russia. The population was 41 as of 2010. There are 2 streets.

== Geography ==
Alexandrovka is located 81 km (50 mi) south of Karaidel (the district's administrative centre) by road. Tat-Kudash is the nearest rural locality.
