= Konstantino-Alexandrovka =

Konstantino-Alexandrovka Константино-Александровка
- Village
- Location within Bashkortostan Location within Russia
- Coordinates: 53°54′N 55°28′E
- Country: Russia
- Region: Bashkortostan
- District: Sterlitamaksky District
- Time zone: UTC+5:00

Konstantino-Alexandrovka (Russian: Константино-Александровка) is a rural locality (a village) in Pervomaysky Selsoviet, Sterlitamaksky District, Bashkortostan, Russia. The population was 21 as of 2010. There is 1 street.

== Geography ==
Konstantino-Alexandrovka is located 54 km northwest of Sterlitamak (the district's administrative centre) by road. Novoabdrakhmanovo is the nearest rural locality.
