= Alexandrovka, Zhirnovsky District, Volgograd Oblast =

Alexandrovka Александровка
- Selo
- Location within Volgograd Oblast Location within Russia
- Coordinates: 51°01′N 44°46′E
- Country: Russia
- Region: Volgograd Oblast
- District: Zhirnovsky District
- Time zone: UTC+4:00

Alexandrovka (Russian: Алекса́ндровка) is a rural locality (a selo) and the administrative center of Alexandrovskoye Rural Settlement, Zhirnovsky District, Volgograd Oblast, Russia. The population was 1,030 as of 2010. There are 26 streets.

== Geography ==
Alexandrovka is located 14 km north of Zhirnovsk (the district's administrative centre) by road. Medveditsa is the nearest rural locality.
