= Alexandrovka, Muromsky District, Vladimir Oblast =

Alexandrovka Александровка
- Village
- Location within Vladimir Oblast Location within Russia
- Coordinates: 55°34′N 41°58′E
- Country: Russia
- Region: Vladimir Oblast
- District: Muromsky District
- Time zone: UTC+3:00

Alexandrovka (Russian: Александровка) is a rural locality (a village) in Muromsky District, Vladimir Oblast, Russia. The population was 607 as of 2010. There are 4 streets.

== Geography ==
Alexandrovka is located 6 km west of Murom. Murom is the nearest rural locality.
