= Alexandrovka, Lgovsky District, Kursk Oblast =

Rural locality in Kursk Oblast, Russia

Alexandrovka Александровка
- Village
- Interactive map of Alexandrovka
- Location of Alexandrovka Alexandrovka (Kursk Oblast)
- Coordinates: 51°30′11″N 35°24′37″E
- Country: Russia
- Federal subject: Kursk Oblast
- Administrative district: Lgovsky District
- SelsovietSelsoviet: Vyshnederevensky

Population (2010 Census)
  - Total: 31
  - Estimate (2010): 31 (0%)

Municipal status
  - Municipal district: Lgovsky Municipal District
  - Rural settlement: Vyshnederevensky Selsoviet Rural Settlement
- Time zone: UTC+3 (MSK)
- Postal code: 307702
- Dialing code: +7 47140
- OKTMO ID: 38622417111
- Website: vishderss.rkursk.ru

Alexandrovka (Russian: Александровка) is a rural locality (Russian: деревня, lit. 'village') in Vyshnederevensky Selsoviet Rural Settlement, Lgovsky District, Kursk Oblast, Russia. Population: 31 (2010 census); 42 (2002 census);

== Geography ==
The village is located on the Bobrik River (a left tributary of the Reut River in the Seym basin), 36 km from the Russia–Ukraine border, 60 km south-west of Kursk, 20 km south-east of the district center – the town Lgov, 10 km from the selsoviet center – Vyshniye Derevenki.

Climate

Alexandrovka has a warm-summer humid continental climate (Dfb in the Köppen climate classification).

== Transport ==
Alexandrovka is located 8 km from the road of regional importance 38K-024 (Lgov – Sudzha), on the roads of intermunicipal significance 38Н-443 (38K-024 – Vyshniye Derevenki – Durovo-Bobrik) and 38Н-444 (38N-443 – Stremoukhovo-Bobrik – border with Kurchatovsky District), 4.5 km from the nearest (closed) railway halt Derevenki (railway line Lgov I — Podkosylev).

The rural locality is situated 67 km from Kursk Vostochny Airport, 125 km from Belgorod International Airport and 267 km from Voronezh Peter the Great Airport.
