= Alexandrovka, Meleuzovsky District, Republic of Bashkortostan =

Alexandrovka Александровка
- Selo
- Location within Bashkortostan Location within Russia
- Coordinates: 53°02′N 56°14′E
- Country: Russia
- Region: Bashkortostan
- District: Meleuzovsky District
- Time zone: UTC+5:00

Alexandrovka (Russian: Александровка) is a rural locality (a selo) and the administrative centre of Alexandrovsky Selsoviet, Meleuzovsky District, Bashkortostan, Russia. The population was 520 as of 2010. There are 6 streets.

== Geography ==
Alexandrovka is located 30 km northeast of Meleuz (the district's administrative centre) by road. Kutlubulatovo is the nearest rural locality.
