= Alexandrovka, Paninsky District, Voronezh Oblast =

Alexandrovka Александровка
- Selo
- Location within Voronezh Oblast Location within Russia
- Coordinates: 51°28′N 39°56′E
- Country: Russia
- Region: Voronezh Oblast
- District: Paninsky District
- Time zone: UTC+3:00

Alexandrovka (Russian: Александровка) is a rural locality (a selo) in Kriushanskoye Rural Settlement, Paninsky District, Voronezh Oblast, Russia. The population was 513 as of 2010. There are 6 streets.

== Geography ==
Alexandrovka is located on the Smychok River, 40 km southwest of Panino (the district's administrative centre) by road. Kriusha is the nearest rural locality.
