= Alexandrovka, Kaltasinsky District, Republic of Bashkortostan =

Alexandrovka Александровка
- Village
- Location within Bashkortostan Location within Russia
- Coordinates: 55°57′N 54°47′E
- Country: Russia
- Region: Bashkortostan
- District: Kaltasinsky District
- Time zone: UTC+5:00

Alexandrovka (Russian: Александровка) is a rural locality (a village) in Kaltasinsky Selsoviet, Kaltasinsky District, Bashkortostan, Russia. The population was 98 as of 2010. There is 1 street.

== Geography ==
Alexandrovka is located 2 km south of Kaltasy (the district's administrative centre) by road. Kaltasy is the nearest rural locality.
