= Alexandrovka, Novoposelenovsky Selsoviet, Kursky District, Kursk Oblast =

Rural locality in Kursk Oblast, Russia

Alexandrovka Александровка
- Village
- Interactive map of Alexandrovka
- Location of Alexandrovka Alexandrovka (Kursk Oblast)
- Coordinates: 51°35′46″N 36°03′23″E
- Country: Russia
- Federal subject: Kursk Oblast
- Administrative district: Kursky District
- SelsovietSelsoviet: Novoposelenovsky

Population (2010 Census)
  - Total: 110
  - Estimate (2010): 110 (0%)

Municipal status
  - Municipal district: Kursky Municipal District
  - Rural settlement: Novoposelenovsky Selsoviet Rural Settlement
- Time zone: UTC+3 (MSK)
- Postal code: 305523
- Dialing code: +7 4712
- OKTMO ID: 38620452106
- Website: novoposel.rkursk.ru

Alexandrovka (Russian: Александровка) is a rural locality (Russian: деревня, lit. 'village') in Novoposelenovsky Selsoviet Rural Settlement, Kursky District, Kursk Oblast, Russia. Population: 110 (2010 census); 114 (2002 census);

== Geography ==
The village is located 76 km from the Russia–Ukraine border, 15 km south-west of Kursk, 5 km from the selsoviet center – 1st Tsvetovo.

Climate

Alexandrovka has a warm-summer humid continental climate (Dfb in the Köppen climate classification).

== Transport ==
Alexandrovka is located 1.5 km from the federal route M-2 Crimea Highway (a part of the European route E105), 1 km from the road of regional importance 38K-010 ("Crimea Highway" – Ivanino, part of the European route E38), on the road of intermunicipal significance 38H-212 (38K-010—Alexandrovka), 5 km from the nearest railway halt and passing loop 454 km (railway line Lgov I–Kursk).

The rural locality is situated 24 km from Kursk Vostochny Airport, 111 km from Belgorod International Airport and 220 km from Voronezh Peter the Great Airport.
