= Alexandrovka, Brezhnevsky Selsoviet, Kursky District, Kursk Oblast =

Rural locality in Kursk Oblast, Russia

Alexandrovka Александровка
- Village
- Interactive map of Alexandrovka
- Location of Alexandrovka Alexandrovka (Kursk Oblast)
- Coordinates: 51°51′33″N 36°01′06″E
- Country: Russia
- Federal subject: Kursk Oblast
- Administrative district: Kursky District
- SelsovietSelsoviet: Brezhnevsky

Population (2010 Census)
  - Total: 23
  - Estimate (2010): 23 (0%)

Municipal status
  - Municipal district: Kursky Municipal District
  - Rural settlement: Brezhnevsky Selsoviet Rural Settlement
- Time zone: UTC+3 (MSK)
- Postal code: 305504
- Dialing code: +7 4712
- OKTMO ID: 38620412206
- Website: brejnevskiy.rkursk.ru

Alexandrovka (Russian: Александровка) is a rural locality (Russian: деревня, lit. 'village') in Brezhnevsky Selsoviet Rural Settlement, Kursky District, Kursk Oblast, Russia. Population: 23 (2010 census); 41 (2002 census);

== Geography ==
The village is located on the Bolshaya Kuritsa River (a right tributary of the Seym River), 93 km from the Russia–Ukraine border, 18 km north-west of Kursk, 3.5 km from the selsoviet center – Verkhnekasinovo.

Climate

Alexandrovka has a warm-summer humid continental climate (Dfb in the Köppen climate classification).

== Transport ==
Alexandrovka is located 3 km from the federal route M-2 Crimea Highway (a part of the European route E105), 1 km from the road of intermunicipal significance 38H-196 ("Crimea Highway" – Dronyayevo), 17.5 km from the nearest railway halt Bukreyevka (railway line Oryol – Kursk).

The rural locality is situated 21.5 km from Kursk Vostochny Airport, 140 km from Belgorod International Airport and 221 km from Voronezh Peter the Great Airport.
