= Alexandrovka, Bizhbulyaksky District, Republic of Bashkortostan =

Alexandrovka Александровка
- Village
- Location within Bashkortostan Location within Russia
- Coordinates: 53°49′N 54°18′E
- Country: Russia
- Region: Bashkortostan
- District: Bizhbulyaksky District
- Time zone: UTC+5:00

Alexandrovka (Russian: Александровка) is a rural locality (a village) in Kalininsky Selsoviet, Bizhbulyaksky District, Bashkortostan, Russia. The population was 25 as of 2010. There is 1 street.

== Geography ==
Alexandrovka is located 24 km north of Bizhbulyak (the district's administrative centre) by road. Petrovka is the nearest rural locality.
