= Alexandrovka, Ostrogozhsky District, Voronezh Oblast =

Alexandrovka Александровка
- Khutor
- Location within Voronezh Oblast Location within Russia
- Coordinates: 50°55′N 39°13′E
- Country: Russia
- Region: Voronezh Oblast
- District: Ostrogozhsky District
- Time zone: UTC+3:00

Alexandrovka (Russian: Александровка) is a rural locality (a khutor) in Krinichenskoye Rural Settlement, Ostrogozhsky District, Voronezh Oblast, Russia. The population was 177 as of 2010. There are 6 streets.

== Geography ==
Alexandrovka is located 25 km northeast of Ostrogozhsk (the district's administrative centre) by road. Krinitsa is the nearest rural locality.
