= Alexandrovka, Bykovsky District, Volgograd Oblast =

Alexandrovka Александровка
- Selo
- Location within Volgograd Oblast Location within Russia
- Coordinates: 49°47′N 45°38′E
- Country: Russia
- Region: Volgograd Oblast
- District: Bykovsky District
- Time zone: UTC+4:00

Alexandrovka (Russian: Александровка) is a rural locality (a selo) and the administrative center of Alexandrovskoye Rural Settlement, Bykovsky District, Volgograd Oblast, Russia. The population was 562 as of 2010. There are 7 streets.

== Geography ==
Alexandrovka is located in steppe, 21 km east of Bykovo (the district's administrative centre) by road. Krasnye Zori is the nearest rural locality.
