= Alexandrovka, Gostomlyansky Selsoviet, Medvensky District, Kursk Oblast =

Rural locality in Kursk Oblast, Russia

Alexandrovka Александровка
- Village
- Interactive map of Alexandrovka
- Location of Alexandrovka Alexandrovka (Kursk Oblast)
- Coordinates: 51°28′53″N 35°48′15″E
- Country: Russia
- Federal subject: Kursk Oblast
- Administrative district: Medvensky District
- SelsovietSelsoviet: Gostomlyansky

Population (2010 Census)
  - Total: 25
  - Estimate (2010): 25 (0%)

Municipal status
  - Municipal district: Medvensky Municipal District
  - Rural settlement: Gostomlyansky Selsoviet Rural Settlement
- Time zone: UTC+3 (MSK)
- Postal code: 307042
- Dialing code: +7 47146
- OKTMO ID: 38624420136
- Website: gostomlja.ru

Alexandrovka (Russian: Александровка) is a rural locality (Russian: деревня, lit. 'village') in Gostomlyansky Selsoviet Rural Settlement, Medvensky District, Kursk Oblast, Russia. Population: 25 (2010 census); 38 (2002 census);

== Geography ==
The village is located on the Bely Kolodez Brook (a right tributary of the Reut River in the Seym basin), 54 km (34 mi) from the Russia–Ukraine border, 35 km (22 mi) south-west of Kursk, 21 km (13 mi) north-west of the district center – the urban-type settlement Medvenka, 5 km (3.1 mi) from the selsoviet center – 1st Gostomlya.

Climate

Alexandrovka has a warm-summer humid continental climate (Dfb in the Köppen climate classification).

== Transport ==
Alexandrovka is located 17.5 km (10.9 mi) from the federal route M-2 Crimea Highway (a part of the European route E105), 3 km (1.9 mi) from the road of regional importance 38K-004 (Dyakonovo – Sudzha – border with Ukraine), 3 km (1.9 mi) from the road of intermunicipal significance 38H-096 (38K-004 – Tarasovo), on the road 38H-097 (38N-096 – Alexandrovka), 17.5 km (10.9 mi) from the nearest railway halt 439 km (railway line Lgov I — Kursk).

The rural locality is situated 45 km (28 mi) from Kursk Vostochny Airport, 107 km (66 mi) from Belgorod International Airport and 240 km (150 mi) from Voronezh Peter the Great Airport.
