= Alexandrovka, Talovsky District, Voronezh Oblast =

Alexandrovka Александровка
- Selo
- Location within Voronezh Oblast Location within Russia
- Coordinates: 51°12′N 40°40′E
- Country: Russia
- Region: Voronezh Oblast
- District: Talovsky District
- Time zone: UTC+3:00

Alexandrovka (Russian: Александровка) is a rural locality (a selo) and the administrative center of Alexandrovskoye Rural Settlement, Talovsky District, Voronezh Oblast, Russia. The population was 797 as of 2010. There are 5 streets.

== Geography ==
Alexandrovka is located 17 km north of Talovaya (the district's administrative centre) by road. Krasny is the nearest rural locality.
