= Tarasovo, Kursk Oblast =

Rural locality in Kursk Oblast, Russia

Tarasovo Тарасово
- Selo
- Interactive map of Tarasovo
- Location of Tarasovo Tarasovo (Kursk Oblast)
- Coordinates: 51°28′18″N 35°45′23″E
- Country: Russia
- Federal subject: Kursk Oblast
- Administrative district: Medvensky District
- SelsovietSelsoviet: Gostomlyansky

Population (2010 Census)
  - Total: 281
  - Estimate (2010): 281 (0%)

Municipal status
  - Municipal district: Medvensky Municipal District
  - Rural settlement: Gostomlyansky Selsoviet Rural Settlement
- Time zone: UTC+3 (MSK)
- Postal code: 307042
- Dialing code: +7 47146
- OKTMO ID: 38624420131
- Website: gostomlja.ru

Tarasovo (Russian: Тарасово) is a rural locality (Russian: село, lit. 'village') in Gostomlyansky Selsoviet Rural Settlement, Medvensky District, Kursk Oblast, Russia. Population: 281 (2010 census); 347 (2002 census);

== Geography ==
The village is located on the Reut River (a left tributary of the Seym), 51 km (32 mi) from the Russia–Ukraine border, 37.5 km (23.3 mi) south-west of Kursk, 24 km (15 mi) north-west of the district center – the urban-type settlement Medvenka, 7 km (4.3 mi) from the selsoviet center – 1st Gostomlya.

Climate

Tarasovo has a warm-summer humid continental climate (Dfb in the Köppen climate classification).

Climate data for Tarasovo
Month	Jan	Feb	Mar	Apr	May	Jun	Jul	Aug	Sep	Oct	Nov	Dec	Year
Mean daily maximum °C (°F)	−4 (25)	−2.9 (26.8)	3 (37)	13.1 (55.6)	19.4 (66.9)	22.7 (72.9)	25.3 (77.5)	24.7 (76.5)	18.2 (64.8)	10.6 (51.1)	3.5 (38.3)	−1.1 (30.0)	11.0 (51.9)
Daily mean °C (°F)	−6.1 (21.0)	−5.5 (22.1)	−0.6 (30.9)	8.3 (46.9)	14.8 (58.6)	18.4 (65.1)	21 (70)	20.1 (68.2)	14.1 (57.4)	7.3 (45.1)	1.2 (34.2)	−3.1 (26.4)	7.5 (45.5)
Mean daily minimum °C (°F)	−8.5 (16.7)	−8.6 (16.5)	−4.6 (23.7)	2.8 (37.0)	9.2 (48.6)	13.1 (55.6)	15.9 (60.6)	15 (59)	9.8 (49.6)	4 (39)	−1.1 (30.0)	−5.3 (22.5)	3.5 (38.2)
Average precipitation mm (inches)	52 (2.0)	44 (1.7)	48 (1.9)	50 (2.0)	64 (2.5)	71 (2.8)	75 (3.0)	56 (2.2)	58 (2.3)	58 (2.3)	47 (1.9)	49 (1.9)	672 (26.5)
Source: https://en.climate-data.org/asia/russian-federation/kursk-oblast/тарасово-681735/

== Transport ==
Tarasovo is located 21 km (13 mi) from the federal route M-2 Crimea Highway (a part of the European route E105), 1 km (0.62 mi) from the road of regional importance 38K-004 (Dyakonovo – Sudzha – border with Ukraine), on the road of intermunicipal significance 38H-096 (38K-004 – Tarasovo), 20 km (12 mi) from the nearest railway halt 439 km (railway line Lgov I — Kursk).

The rural locality is situated 48 km (30 mi) from Kursk Vostochny Airport, 108 km (67 mi) from Belgorod International Airport and 243 km (151 mi) from Voronezh Peter the Great Airport.
