= Tambov constituency =

Legislative constituency in Russia

Tambov single-member constituency
- Constituency of the Russian State Duma
- Deputy: Tamara Frolova; United Russia
- Federal subject: Tambov Oblast
- Districts: Bondarsky, Gavrilovsky, Inzhavinsky, Kirsanov, Kirsanovsky, Kotovsk, Michurinsk, Michurinsky, Mordovsky, Morshansk, Morshansky, Muchkapsky, Nikiforovsky, Pervomaysky, Petrovsky, Pichayevsky, Rasskazovo, Rasskazovsky, Rzhaksinsky, Sampursky, Sosnovsky, Staroyuryevsky, Tambov, Tambovsky, Tokaryovsky, Umyotsky, Uvarovo, Uvarovsky, Zherdevsky, Znamensky
- Voters: 765,542 (2026)

The Tambov constituency (No.177 (Note: No.170 in 1993-1995, No.171 in 1995-2007)) is a Russian legislative constituency in Tambov Oblast. The constituency covers the entirety of Tambov Oblast.

The constituency has been represented since 2026 by United Russia deputy Tamara Frolova, three-term State Duma member and former Deputy Head of Tambov Oblast. Prior three-term Rodina incumbent Aleksey Zhuravlyov successfully sought re-election in the Neftekamsk constituency, while two-term United Russia incumbent Aleksandr Polyakov, who was redistricted from the eliminated Rasskazovo constituency, retired.

== Boundaries ==
1993–2007: Bondarsky District, Gavrilovsky District, Inzhavinsky District, Kirsanov, Kirsanovsky District, Kotovsk, Muchkapsky District, Rasskazovo, Rasskazovsky District, Tambov, Tambovsky District, Umyotsky District
The constituency covered the oblast capital Tambov and eastern Tambov Oblast, including the towns Kirsanov, Kotovsk and Rasskazovo.

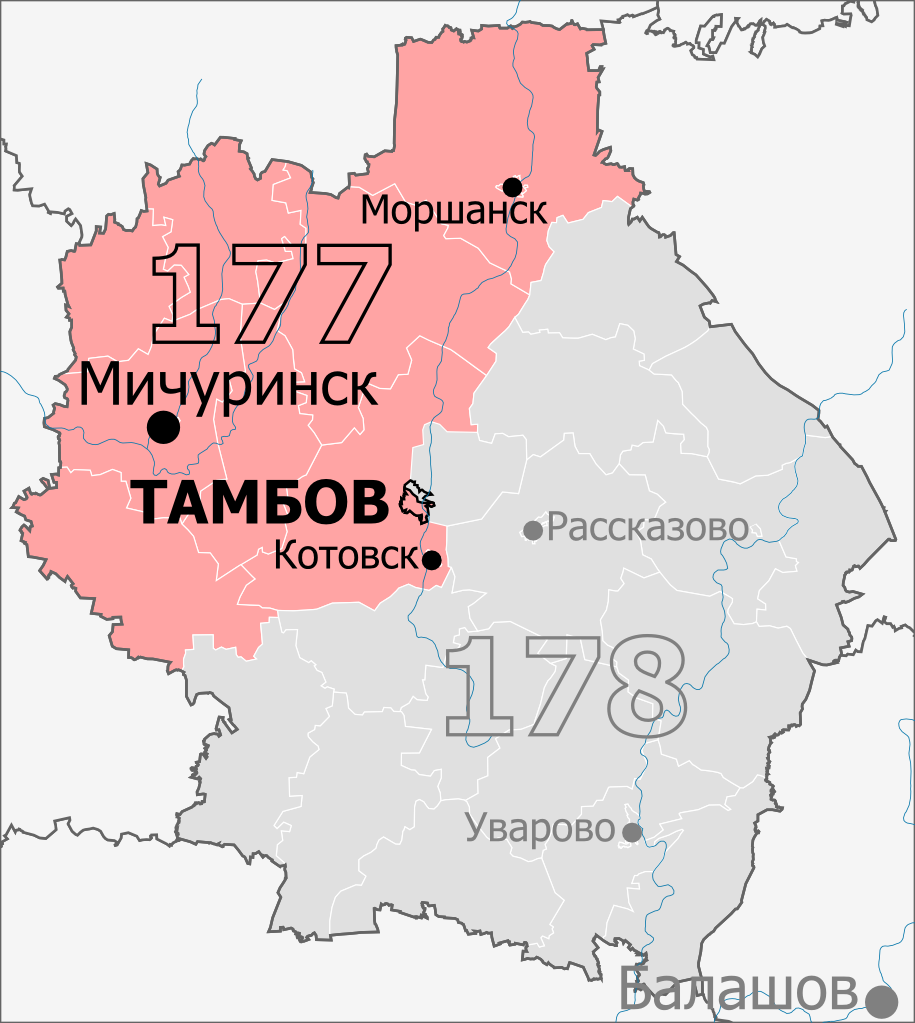
Constituency boundaries from 2016 to 2026

2016–2026: Kotovsk, Michurinsk, Michurinsky District, Morshansk, Morshansky District, Nikiforovsky District, Pervomaysky District, Petrovsky District, Sosnovsky District, Staroyuryevsky District, Tambov (Leninsky, Sovetsky), Tambovsky District (Avdeyevsky, Belomestnodvoynevsky, Belomestnokriushinsky, Bogoslovsky, Bokinsky, Bolshelipovitsky, Chelnavsky, Chernyanovsky, Gorelsky, Komsomolsky, Krasnosvobodnensky, Kuzmino-Gatyevsky, Lysogorsky, Malinovsky, Novoseltsevsky, Orlovsky, Pokrovo-Prigorodny, Seleznevsky, Streletsky, Suravinsky, Tsninsky)
The constituency was re-created for the 2016 election and retained only south-western part of Tambov, its western suburbs and exurbs, satellite city Kotovsk, losing the rest to new Rasskazovo constituency. This seat took north-western half of Tambov Oblast, including the towns Michurinsk and Morshansk, from the dissolved Michurinsk constituency.

2026–present: Bondarsky District, Gavrilovsky District, Inzhavinsky District, Kirsanov, Kirsanovsky District, Kotovsk, Michurinsk, Michurinsky District, Mordovsky District, Morshansk, Morshansky District, Muchkapsky District, Nikiforovsky District, Pervomaysky District, Petrovsky District, Pichayevsky District, Rasskazovo, Rasskazovsky District, Rzhaksinsky District, Sampursky District, Sosnovsky District, Staroyuryevsky District, Tambov, Tambovsky District, Tokaryovsky District, Umyotsky District, Uvarovo, Uvarovsky District, Zherdevsky District, Znamensky District
After the 2025 redistricting Tambov Oblast lost one of its two constituencies, so both Tambov and Rasskazovo constituencies were merged into a single constituency, covering the entirety of Tambov Oblast.

== Members elected ==
Election	Member	Party
1993	Tamara Pletnyova	Communist Party
1995	Tamara Pletnyova	Communist Party
1999	Tamara Pletnyova	Communist Party
2003	Ivan Vasilyev	Independent
2007	Proportional representation - no election by constituency	
2011	Proportional representation - no election by constituency	
2016	Aleksandr Polyakov	United Russia
2021	Aleksey Zhuravlyov	Rodina
2026	Tamara Frolova	United Russia

== Election results ==
=== 1993 ===
Summary of the 12 December 1993 Russian legislative election in the Tambov constituency
Candidate	Party	Votes	%
Tamara Pletnyova	Communist Party	99,729	31.45%
Aleksey Ananyev	Independent	–	6.70%
Yury Azovtsev	Choice of Russia	–	–
Vyacheslav Chubarev	Independent	–	–
Lanna Denisova	Independent	–	–
Vladimir Filonov	Future of Russia–New Names	–	–
Vladislav Golovin	Dignity and Charity	–	–
Vladimir Grebennikov	Independent	–	–
Mikhail Grebenshchikov	Liberal Democratic Party	–	–
Gennady Kondratyev	Civic Union	–	–
Eduard Nemtsov	Independent	–	–
Valentin Pronin	Independent	–	–
Lev Protasov	Yavlinsky–Boldyrev–Lukin	–	–
Tamara Shestakova	Independent	–	–
Vera Skorodumova	Women of Russia	–	–
Nikolay Usachev	Independent	–	–
Total		317,110	100%

=== 1995 ===
Summary of the 17 December 1995 Russian legislative election in the Tambov constituency
Candidate	Party	Votes	%
Tamara Pletnyova (incumbent)	Communist Party	115,369	33.40%
Yury Baturov	Independent	35,385	10.25%
Eduard Nemtsov	Independent	29,926	8.66%
Vitaly Zhuravlev	Liberal Democratic Party	29,088	8.42%
Valery Uvarov	Independent	21,488	6.22%
Anatoly Petrov	Independent	12,465	3.61%
Viktor Aksyuchits	Stanislav Govorukhin Bloc	12,449	3.60%
Vladimir Markov	Agrarian Party	11,838	3.43%
Yelena Skorobogatova	Independent	11,442	3.31%
Vyacheslav Shostakovsky	Independent	7,098	2.06%
Viktor Pashinin	Pamfilova–Gurov–Lysenko	6,879	1.99%
Aleksey Mishin	Independent	6,715	1.94%
Lyudmila Yegorova	Independent	3,956	1.15%
against all		29,315	8.49%
Total		345,372	100%

=== 1999 ===
Summary of the 19 December 1999 Russian legislative election in the Tambov constituency
Candidate	Party	Votes	%
Tamara Pletnyova (incumbent)	Communist Party	78,869	25.42%
Nina Koval	Independent	41,107	13.25%
Pavel Zabelin	Independent	40,049	12.91%
Aleksandr Yegorov	Our Home – Russia	34,041	10.97%
Yury Baturov	Independent	22,377	7.21%
Dmitry Yefanov	Independent	16,370	5.28%
Valery Uvarov	Independent	11,514	3.71%
Valery Dzhurayev	Independent	7,445	2.40%
Vladimir Zemtsev	Independent	6,363	2.05%
Sergey Ivashkov	Liberal Democratic Party	4,126	1.33%
Vasily Popov	Andrey Nikolayev and Svyatoslav Fyodorov Bloc	2,039	0.66%
Natalya Sokolova	Party of Peace and Unity	1,846	0.60%
Vyacheslav Shutilin	Independent	1,795	0.58%
Vladimir Kuznetsov	Spiritual Heritage	1,591	0.51%
Galina Kochurova	For Civil Dignity	1,581	0.51%
Nikolay Pridvorov	Independent	753	0.24%
against all		31,489	10.15%
Total		310,236	100%

=== 2003 ===
Summary of the 7 December 2003 Russian legislative election in the Tambov constituency
Candidate	Party	Votes	%
Ivan Vasilyev	Independent	81,907	30.79%
Tamara Pletnyova (incumbent)	Communist Party	60,242	22.65%
Nina Koval	Independent	36,662	13.78%
Oleg Levchenko	Independent	26,294	9.88%
Nikolay Vorobyev	Independent	7,651	2.88%
Valery Tomilchik	Yabloko	2,886	1.08%
Yelizaveta Dolgopolova	Party of Russia's Rebirth-Russian Party of Life	2,634	0.99%
Valery Grishkin	United Russian Party Rus'	1,909	0.72%
against all		37,509	14.10%
Total		266,415	100%

=== 2016 ===
Summary of the 18 September 2016 Russian legislative election in the Tambov constituency
Candidate	Party	Votes	%
Aleksandr Polyakov	United Russia	132,323	61.23%
Andrey Zhidkov	Communist Party	22,282	10.31%
Anatoly Artemov	Rodina	15,744	7.28%
Irina Popova	A Just Russia	14,377	6.65%
Konstantin Susakov	Liberal Democratic Party	11,984	5.55%
Vasily Kopylev	Communists of Russia	5,872	2.72%
Sergey Panfilov	The Greens	2,990	1.38%
Irina Misanova	Party of Growth	2,803	1.30%
Olga Grekova	Patriots of Russia	2,095	0.97%
Total		216,102	100%

=== 2021 ===
Summary of the 17-19 September 2021 Russian legislative election in the Tambov constituency
Candidate	Party	Votes	%
Aleksey Zhuravlyov	Rodina	126,733	52.26%
Andrey Zhidkov	Communist Party	41,432	17.08%
Pavel Plotnikov	A Just Russia — For Truth	16,905	6.97%
Oleg Morozov	Liberal Democratic Party	14,617	6.03%
Nikita Peresypkin	New People	9,846	4.06%
Denis Marshavin	Party of Pensioners	6,771	2.79%
Vladimir Zhilkin	Yabloko	5,405	2.23%
Irina Chkhaidze	Green Alternative	5,229	2.16%
Yulia Udalova	Civic Platform	4,244	1.75%
Pavel Khanzhinov	Russian Party of Freedom and Justice	2,900	1.20%
Total		242,518	100%

=== 2026 ===
Summary of the 18-20 September 2026 Russian legislative election in the Tambov constituency
Candidate	Party	Votes	%
Tamara Frolova	United Russia	295,658	64.77%
Andrey Zhidkov	Communist Party	62,288	13.65%
Pavel Plotnikov	A Just Russia	29,075	6.37%
Aleksandr Aseyev	Liberal Democratic Party	28,578	6.26%
Aleksey Konstantinov	New People	23,669	5.19%
Yana Zenkina	Yabloko	10,486	2.30%
Total		456,488	100%
