= Rasskazovo constituency =

Rasskazovo single-member constituency
- Constituency of the Russian State Duma

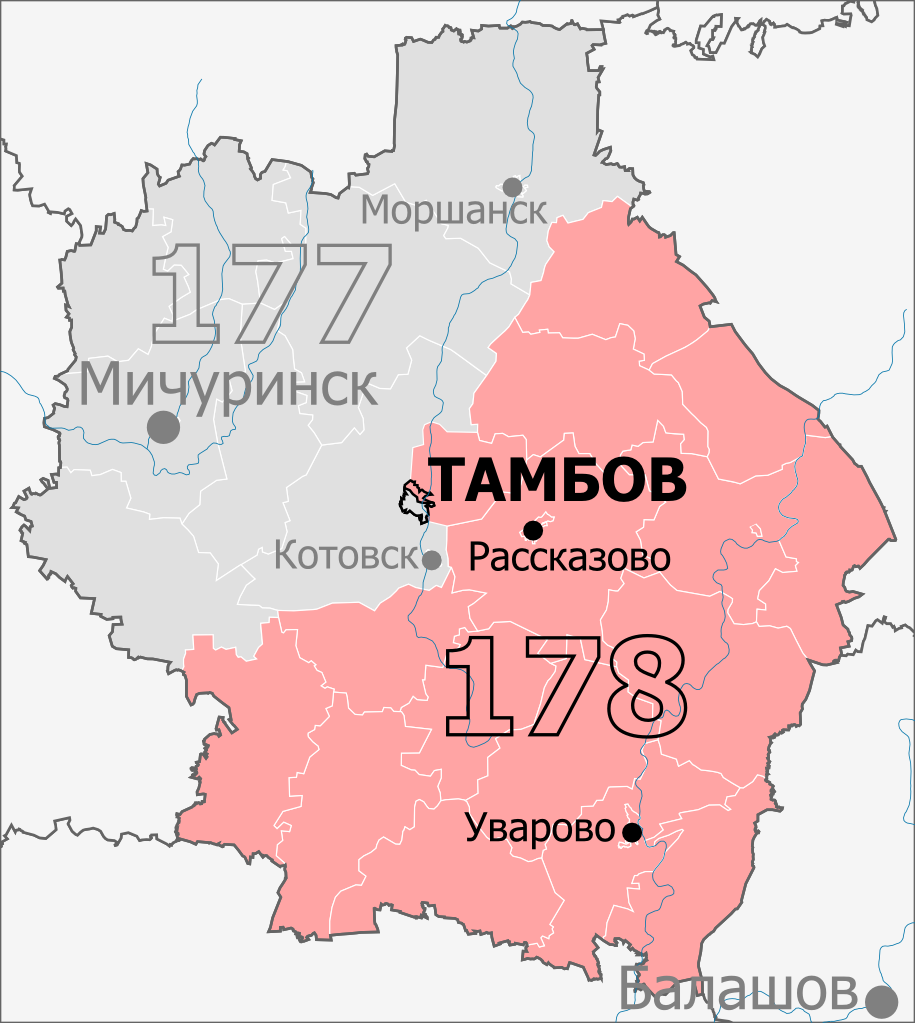
- Constituency boundaries from 2016 to 2026
- Deputy: None
- Federal subject: Tambov Oblast
- Districts: Bondarsky, Gavrilovsky, Inzhavinsky, Kirsanov, Kirsanovsky, Mordovsky, Muchkapsky, Pichayevsky, Rasskazovo, Rasskazovsky, Rzhaksinsky, Sampursky, Tambov (Oktyabrsky), Tambovsky (Donskoy, Novaya Lyada, Stolovsky, Tatnovsky, Tulinovsky), Tokaryovsky, Umyotsky, Uvarovo, Uvarovsky, Zherdevsky, Znamensky
- Other territory: Germany (Hamburg-2)
- Voters: 402,977 (2021)

The Rasskazovo constituency (No.178) was a Russian legislative constituency in Tambov Oblast in 2016–2026. The constituency covered north-eastern part of Tambov and south-eastern half of Tambov Oblast, including the towns Rasskazovo and Uvarovo. After 2025 redistricting Tambov Oblast lost one of its two constituencies, so Rasskazovo constituency was dissolved and merged with Tambov constituency.

The constituency was last represented by United Russia deputy Aleksandr Polyakov, a two-term State Duma member and agribusinessman, who previously represented neighbouring Tambov constituency. Polyakov succeeded one-term United Russia incumbent Aleksandr Zhupikov in 2021. Polyakov did not seek re-election in 2026.

== Boundaries ==
2016–2026: Bondarsky District, Gavrilovsky District, Inzhavinsky District, Kirsanov, Kirsanovsky District, Mordovsky District, Muchkapsky District, Pichayevsky District, Rasskazovo, Rasskazovsky District, Rzhaksinsky District, Sampursky District, Tambov (Oktyabrsky), Tambovsky District (Donskoy, Novaya Lyada, Stolovsky, Tatnovsky, Tulinovsky), Tokaryovsky District, Umyotsky District, Uvarovo, Uvarovsky District, Zherdevsky District, Znamensky District
The constituency was created for the 2016 election, taking north-eastern Tambov and eastern Tambov Oblast from Tambov constituency, and southern Tambov Oblast from the dissolved Michurinsk constituency.

== Members elected ==
Election	Member	Party
2016	Aleksandr Zhupikov	United Russia
2021	Aleksandr Polyakov	United Russia

== Election results ==
=== 2016 ===
==== Declared candidates ====
- Artyom Aleksandrov (CPRF), Member of Tambov City Duma (2011–present)
- Roman Khudyakov (Rodina), Member of State Duma (2012–present), 2014 LDPR gubernatorial candidate
- Viktor Pashinin (A Just Russia), agriculture executive, farmers' rights activist
- Gulnur Potankina (CPCR), perennial candidate
- Artyom Spirin (GS), unemployed
- Igor Telegin (LDPR), retired businessman
- Aleksandr Zhupikov (United Russia), Member of Tambov Oblast Duma (2011–present), agriculture businessman

==== Failed to qualify ====
- Vladimir Zhilkin (PARNAS), Open Russia regional coordinator

==== Declined ====
- Svetlana Korostelyova (United Russia), Member of Tambov Oblast Duma (2011–present) (lost the primary)
- Boris Popov (United Russia), Member of Tambov Oblast Duma (2011–present), produce market director (lost the primary)
- Gennady Sosedov (United Russia), Member of Tambov Oblast Duma (2011–present) (lost the primary)

==== Results ====
Summary of the 18 September 2016 Russian legislative election in the Rasskazovo constituency
Candidate	Party	Votes	%
Aleksandr Zhupikov	United Russia	112,869	55.57%
Roman Khudyakov	Rodina	37,112	18.27%
Artyom Aleksandrov	Communist Party	19,001	9.36%
Igor Telegin	Liberal Democratic Party	11,711	5.77%
Viktor Pashinin	A Just Russia	8,559	4.21%
Gulnur Potankina	Communists of Russia	6,248	3.08%
Artyom Spirin	Civilian Power	1,213	0.60%
Total		203,092	100%

=== 2021 ===
==== Declared candidates ====
- Artyom Aleksandrov (CPRF), Member of Tambov City Duma (2011–present), 2016 candidate for this seat
- Yury Antsiferov (Party of Growth), PR specialist
- Yelena Badak (SR–ZP), aide to State Duma member Yevgeny Marchenko
- Denis Dubovitsky (LDPR), regional manager
- Aleksandr Polyakov (United Russia), Member of State Duma (2016–present)
- Ilya Vorotnikov (New People), undergraduate student

==== Declined ====
- Aleksandr Zhupikov (United Russia), incumbent Member of State Duma (2016–present)

==== Results ====
Summary of the 17-19 September 2021 Russian legislative election in the Rasskazovo constituency
Candidate	Party	Votes	%
Aleksandr Polyakov	United Russia	127,591	54.58%
Artyom Aleksandrov	Communist Party	47,226	20.20%
Yelena Badak	A Just Russia — For Truth	20,330	8.70%
Denis Dubovitsky	Liberal Democratic Party	14,774	6.32%
Ilya Vorotnikov	New People	9,767	4.18%
Yury Antsiferov	Party of Growth	6,264	2.68%
Total		242,518	100%
