= Michurinsk constituency =

Russian legislative constituency

Michurinsk single-member constituency
- Constituency of the Russian State Duma

- Deputy: None
- Federal subject: Tambov Oblast
- Districts: Michurinsk, Michurinsky, Mordovsky, Morshansk, Morshansky, Nikiforovsky, Pervomaysky, Petrovsky, Pichayevsky, Rzhaksinsky, Sampursky, Sosnovsky, Staroyuryevsky, Tokaryovsky, Uvarovo, Uvarovsky, Zherdevsky, Znamensky
- Voters: 429,767 (2003)

The Michurinsk constituency (No.170 (Note: No.169 in 1993-1995)) was a Russian legislative constituency in Tambov Oblast from 1993 to 2007. It covered mostly rural northern, western and southern Tambov Oblast. The seat was last occupied by United Russia faction member Vladimir Dubovik, a breeding plant director, who defeated three-term Communist incumbent Aleksey Ponomaryov in the 2003 election.

The constituency was dissolved in 2007 when State Duma adopted full proportional representation for the next two electoral cycles. Michurinsk constituency was not re-established for the 2016 election, currently most of former Michurinsk constituency is part of Tambov constituency.

== Boundaries ==
1993–2007: Michurinsk, Michurinsky District, Mordovsky District, Morshansk, Morshansky District, Nikiforovsky District, Pervomaysky District, Petrovsky District, Pichayevsky District, Rzhaksinsky District, Sampursky District, Sosnovsky District, Staroyuryevsky District, Tokaryovsky District, Uvarovo, Uvarovsky District, Zherdevsky District, Znamensky District
The constituency covered northern, western and southern Tambov Oblast, including the towns of Michurinsk, Morshansk and Uvarovo.

== Members elected ==
Election	Member	Party
1993	Aleksey Ponomaryov	Communist Party
1995	Aleksey Ponomaryov	Communist Party
1999	Aleksey Ponomaryov	Communist Party
2003	Vladimir Dubovik	Independent

== Election results ==
=== 1993 ===
==== Declared candidates ====
- Yevgeny Aleksandrov (Independent), first deputy chief of the South Eastern Railway Michurinsk division
- Viktor Gusev (Independent), Head of Administration of Morshansky District (1992–present)
- Vyacheslav Kalinin (BR–NI), Tambov Institute of Chemical Engineering department head
- Nikolay Kalinov (Independent), Head of the Tambov Department of Consumer Market Regulation (1993–present)
- Nina Krivelskaya (LDPR), Academy of the Ministry of Internal Affairs senior researcher
- Yury Muromtsev (Choice of Russia), Tambov Institute of Chemical Engineering department of radio electronics and microprocessors head
- Aleksey Ponomaryov (CPRF), former People's Deputy of Russia (1990–1993)
- Anatoly Zavrazhnov (Independent), rector of Michurinsk Horticultural Institute (1985–present)

==== Results ====
Summary of the 12 December 1993 Russian legislative election in the Michurinsk constituency
Candidate	Party	Votes	%
Aleksey Ponomaryov	Communist Party	73,153	23.81%
Anatoly Zavrazhnov	Independent	–	16.20%
Yevgeny Aleksandrov	Independent	–	–
Viktor Gusev	Independent	–	–
Vyacheslav Kalinin	Future of Russia–New Names	–	–
Nikolay Kalinov	Independent	–	–
Nina Krivelskaya	Liberal Democratic Party	–	–
Yury Muromtsev	Choice of Russia	–	–
Total		307,229	100%

=== 1995 ===
==== Declared candidates ====
- Aleksandr Babayev (Independent), Deputy Head of Administration of Tambov Oblast – Head of the Department of Agriculture (1992–present)
- Nina Krivelskaya (LDPR), Member of State Duma (1994–present), 1993 candidate for this seat
- Yury Kobzev (Independent), attorney
- Aleksey Ponomaryov (CPRF), incumbent Member of State Duma (1994–present)
- Anatoly Zavrazhnov (Independent), rector of Michurinsk Horticultural Institute (1985–present), 1993 candidate for this seat

==== Results ====
Summary of the 17 December 1995 Russian legislative election in the Michurinsk constituency
Candidate	Party	Votes	%
Aleksey Ponomaryov (incumbent)	Communist Party	148,606	46.38%
Anatoly Zavrazhnov	Independent	57,998	18.10%
Nina Krivelskaya	Liberal Democratic Party	28,065	8.76%
Aleksandr Babayev	Independent	25,043	7.82%
Yury Kobzev	Independent	18,832	5.88%
against all		33,608	10.49%
Total		320,396	100%

=== 1999 ===
==== Declared candidates ====
- Vadim Balak (Independent), chemical executive
- Oleg Barov (Independent), Member of Morshansk City Council of Deputies (1996–present), brewery board chairman
- Vladimir Dubovitsky (Independent), Mayor of Michurinsk (1998–present)
- Sergey Filimonov (Independent), former Member of Tambov Oblast Duma (1994–1997), breeding plant director
- Vladimir Filonov (Nikolayev–Fyodorov Bloc), Chairman of the Tambov Oblast Property Fund
- Aleksandr Ivanov (Independent), Head of the Morshansk Department of Education (1997–present)
- Yury Kobzev (Independent), attorney, 1995 candidate for this seat
- Nikolay Kochetov (RPP), Deputy Head of Administration of Morshansky District (1998–present)
- Kirill Kolonchin (Independent), avionics plant board chairman
- Lyudmila Kudinova (SPS), former People's Deputy of Russia (1990–1993)
- Aleksey Ponomaryov (CPRF), incumbent Member of State Duma (1994–present)
- Vladimir Ryabykh (For Civil Dignity), Tambov State University economics lecturer
- Yury Safonov (NDR), vocational college director
- Aleksandr Shubin (Independent), poultry plant director

==== Did not file ====
- Gennady Firsanov (LDPR)
- Vladimir Goncharov (Independent)
- Valery Ledovskikh (PME), radio plant foreman
- Tamara Potekhina (KRO-Boldyrev), accountant

==== Results ====
Summary of the 19 December 1999 Russian legislative election in the Michurinsk constituency
Candidate	Party	Votes	%
Aleksey Ponomaryov (incumbent)	Communist Party	58,835	21.47%
Nikolay Kochetov	Party of Pensioners	28,129	10.26%
Vladimir Dubovitsky	Independent	27,971	10.20%
Lyudmila Kudinova	Union of Right Forces	22,981	8.38%
Aleksandr Shubin	Independent	20,801	7.59%
Aleksandr Ivanov	Independent	15,296	5.58%
Vladimir Ryabykh	For Civil Dignity	15,262	5.57%
Oleg Barov	Independent	10,096	3.68%
Kirill Kolonchin	Independent	8,608	3.14%
Sergey Filimonov	Independent	8,123	2.96%
Yury Safonov	Our Home – Russia	6,070	2.21%
Yury Kobzev	Independent	4,510	1.65%
Vadim Balak	Independent	2,449	0.89%
Vladimir Filonov	Andrey Nikolayev and Svyatoslav Fyodorov Bloc	2,070	0.76%
against all		34,290	12.51%
Total		274,096	100%

=== 2003 ===
==== Declared candidates ====
- Vladimir Dubovik (Independent), breeding plant director
- Nikolay Kochetov (RPP-PSS), former Deputy Head of Administration of Morshansky District (1998–2000), 1999 candidate for this seat
- Aleksey Ponomaryov (CPRF), incumbent Member of State Duma (1994–present)
- Vyacheslav Sechnev (ORP Rus'), disabled rights nonprofit chairman
- Yevgeny Skriptsov (Independent), businessman

==== Did not file ====
- Andrey Getmanov (VR–ES), political consultant
- Anatoly Plutalov (Independent), Member of Tambov Oblast Duma (1997–present), road construction executive
- Aleksandr Sheptalin (Independent), electrician
- Andrey Tolkachev (Yabloko), correctional primary school principal

==== Results ====
Summary of the 7 December 2003 Russian legislative election in the Michurinsk constituency
Candidate	Party	Votes	%
Vladimir Dubovik	Independent	93,850	41.79%
Aleksey Ponomaryov (incumbent)	Communist Party	43,310	19.29%
Nikolay Kochetov	Russian Pensioners' Party-Party of Social Justice	36,716	16.35%
Andrey Getmanov	Great Russia – Eurasian Union	11,204	4.99%
Yevgeny Skriptsov	Independent	2,406	1.07%
Vyacheslav Sechnev	United Russian Party Rus'	2,363	1.05%
against all		27,259	12.14%
Total		224,804	100%
