= Administrative divisions of Tambov Oblast =

Tambov Oblast Russia
- Administrative center: Tambov

Administrative structure (as of 2014)
- Districts: 23
- Cities/towns: 8
- Urban-type settlements: 12
- Selsovets: 234

Municipal structure (as of 2002)
- Rural settlements: 1,753 (inhabited); 94 (uninhabited)

Tambov Oblast is a federal subject of Russia.

== Administrative and municipal divisions ==
- Cities and towns under the oblast's jurisdiction:
  - Tambov (Тамбов) (administrative center)
    - city districts:
      - Leninskiy
      - Oktyabrskiy
      - Sovetsky
  - Kirsanov (Кирсанов)
  - Kotovsk (Котовск)
  - Michurinsk (Мичуринск)
  - Morshansk (Моршанск)
  - Rasskazovo (Рассказово)
  - Uvarovo (Уварово)
- Districts:
  - Bondarsky (Бондарский)
    - with 8 selsovets under the district's jurisdiction.
  - Gavrilovsky (Гавриловский)
    - with 6 selsovets under the district's jurisdiction.
  - Inzhavinsky (Инжавинский)
    - Urban-type settlements under the district's jurisdiction:
      - Inzhavino (Инжавино)
    - with 13 selsovets under the district's jurisdiction.
  - Kirsanovsky (Кирсановский)
    - with 8 selsovets under the district's jurisdiction.
  - Michurinsky (Мичуринский)
    - with 14 selsovets under the district's jurisdiction.
  - Mordovsky (Мордовский)
    - Urban-type settlements under the district's jurisdiction:
      - Mordovo (Мордово)
      - Novopokrovka (Новопокровка)
    - with 5 selsovets under the district's jurisdiction.
  - Morshansky (Моршанский)
    - with 16 selsovets under the district's jurisdiction.
  - Muchkapsky (Мучкапский)
    - Urban-type settlements under the district's jurisdiction:
      - Muchkapsky (Мучкапский)
    - with 7 selsovets under the district's jurisdiction.
  - Nikiforovsky (Никифоровский)
    - Urban-type settlements under the district's jurisdiction:
      - Dmitriyevka (Дмитриевка)
    - with 5 selsovets under the district's jurisdiction.
  - Pervomaysky (Первомайский)
    - Urban-type settlements under the district's jurisdiction:
      - Pervomaysky (Первомайский)
    - with 10 selsovets under the district's jurisdiction.
  - Petrovsky (Петровский)
    - with 12 selsovets under the district's jurisdiction.
  - Pichayevsky (Пичаевский)
    - with 10 selsovets under the district's jurisdiction.
  - Rasskazovsky (Рассказовский)
    - with 13 selsovets under the district's jurisdiction.
  - Rzhaksinsky (Ржаксинский)
    - Urban-type settlements under the district's jurisdiction:
      - Rzhaksa (Ржакса)
    - with 10 selsovets under the district's jurisdiction.
  - Sampursky (Сампурский)
    - with 5 selsovets under the district's jurisdiction.
  - Sosnovsky (Сосновский)
    - Urban-type settlements under the district's jurisdiction:
      - Sosnovka (Сосновка)
    - with 16 selsovets under the district's jurisdiction.
  - Staroyuryevsky (Староюрьевский)
    - with 9 selsovets under the district's jurisdiction.
  - Tambovsky (Тамбовский)
    - Urban-type settlements under the district's jurisdiction:
      - Novaya Lyada (Новая Ляда)
    - with 25 selsovets under the district's jurisdiction.
  - Tokaryovsky (Токарёвский)
    - Urban-type settlements under the district's jurisdiction:
      - Tokaryovka (Токарёвка)
    - with 9 selsovets under the district's jurisdiction.
  - Umyotsky (Умётский)
    - Urban-type settlements under the district's jurisdiction:
      - Umyot (Умёт)
    - with 8 selsovets under the district's jurisdiction.
  - Uvarovsky (Уваровский)
    - with 7 selsovets under the district's jurisdiction.
  - Zherdevsky (Жердевский)
    - Towns under the district's jurisdiction:
      - Zherdevka (Жердевка)
    - with 11 selsovets under the district's jurisdiction.
  - Znamensky (Знаменский)
    - Urban-type settlements under the district's jurisdiction:
      - Znamenka (Знаменка)
    - with 7 selsovets under the district's jurisdiction.
