= Novopokrovka, Tambov Oblast =

Novopokrovka Новопокровка
- Urban-type settlement
- Flag Coat of arms
- Interactive map of Novopokrovka
- Location of Novopokrovka Novopokrovka (Tambov Oblast)
- Coordinates: 52.1344°N 40.8756°E
- Country: Russia
- Federal subject: Tambov Oblast
- Administrative district: Mordovsky District
- Founded: 1908
- Elevation: 182 m (597 ft)

Population (2010 Census)
  - Total: 2,047
  - Estimate (2021): 1,560 (−23.8%)
- Time zone: UTC+3 (MSK)
- Postal code: 393610
- OKTMO ID: 68614154051

Novopokrovka (Russian: Новопокровка) is an urban locality (an urban-type settlement) in Mordovsky District of Tambov Oblast, Russia. Population: 2,047 (2010 census); 2,232 (2002 census); 3,680 (1989 Soviet census).
