= Alexander Polyakov (politician) =

Russian politician

- Александр Поляков
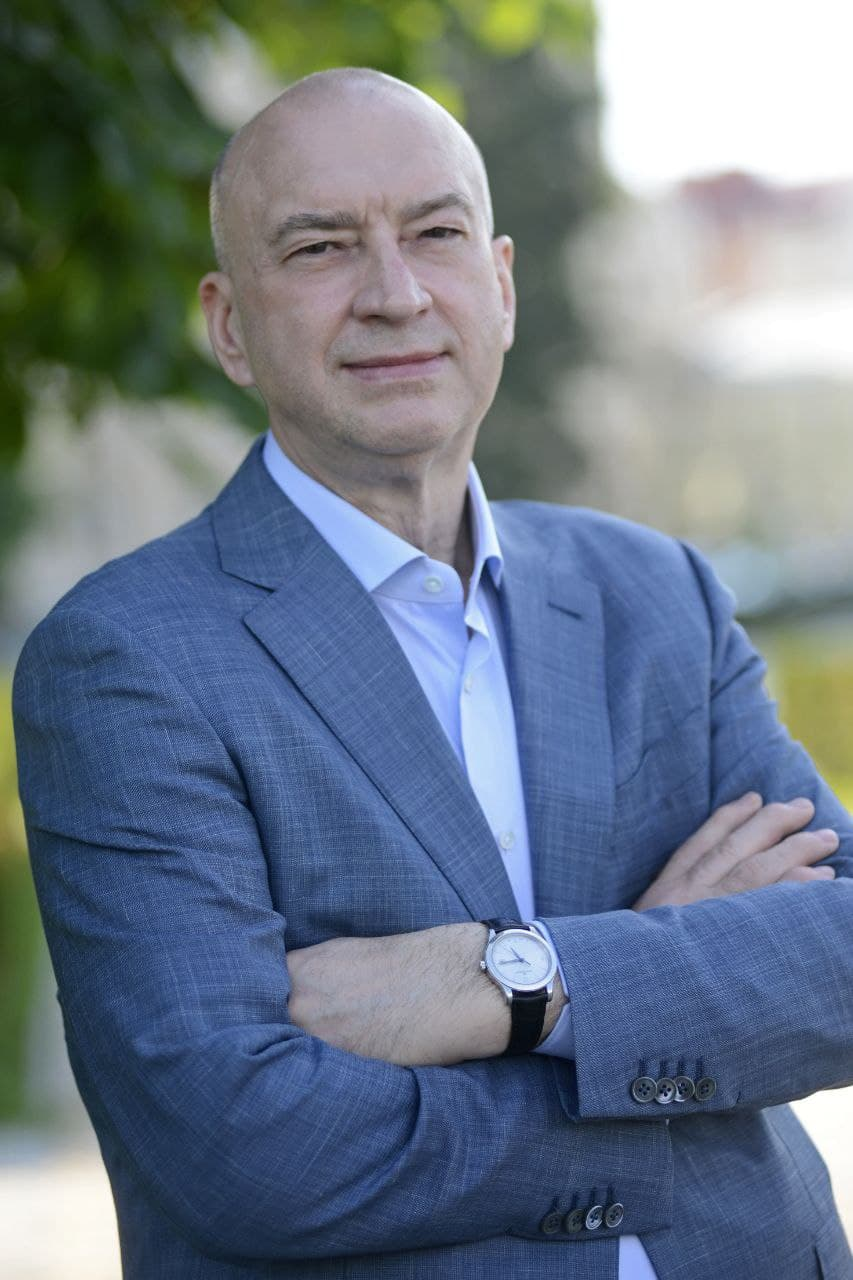

Member of the State Duma for Tambov Oblast
- Incumbent
- Assumed office 12 October 2021
- Preceded by: Aleksandr Zhupikov
- Constituency: Rasskazovo (No. 178)
- In office 5 October 2016 – 12 October 2021
- Preceded by: constituency re-established
- Succeeded by: Aleksey Zhuravlyov
- Constituency: Tambov (No. 177)

Personal details
- Born: 31 January 1969 (age 57) Vishnovoye, Tambov Oblast, Russian SFSR, USSR
- Party: United Russia
- Education: Michurin State Agrarian University

Alexander Polyakov (Russian: Александр Алексеевич Поляков; born 31 January 1969, Vishnovoye, Tambov Oblast) is a Russian political figure and a deputy of the 8th State Duma.

In 1995, Polyakov engaged in business. From 1998 to 2001, he worked as an economist. In 2001-2003, Polyakov was the director of the Tambovbreadmacaronproduct. In February 2009, he joined the United Russia. In 2016, he was elected deputy of the 7th State Duma. In 2021, Polyakov was re-elected for the 8th State Duma from the Tambov Oblast constituency.

== Sanctions ==
He was sanctioned by the UK government in 2022 in relation to the Russo-Ukrainian War.
