= Rasskazovo =

Town in Tambov Oblast, Russia

Rasskazovo Рассказово
- Town
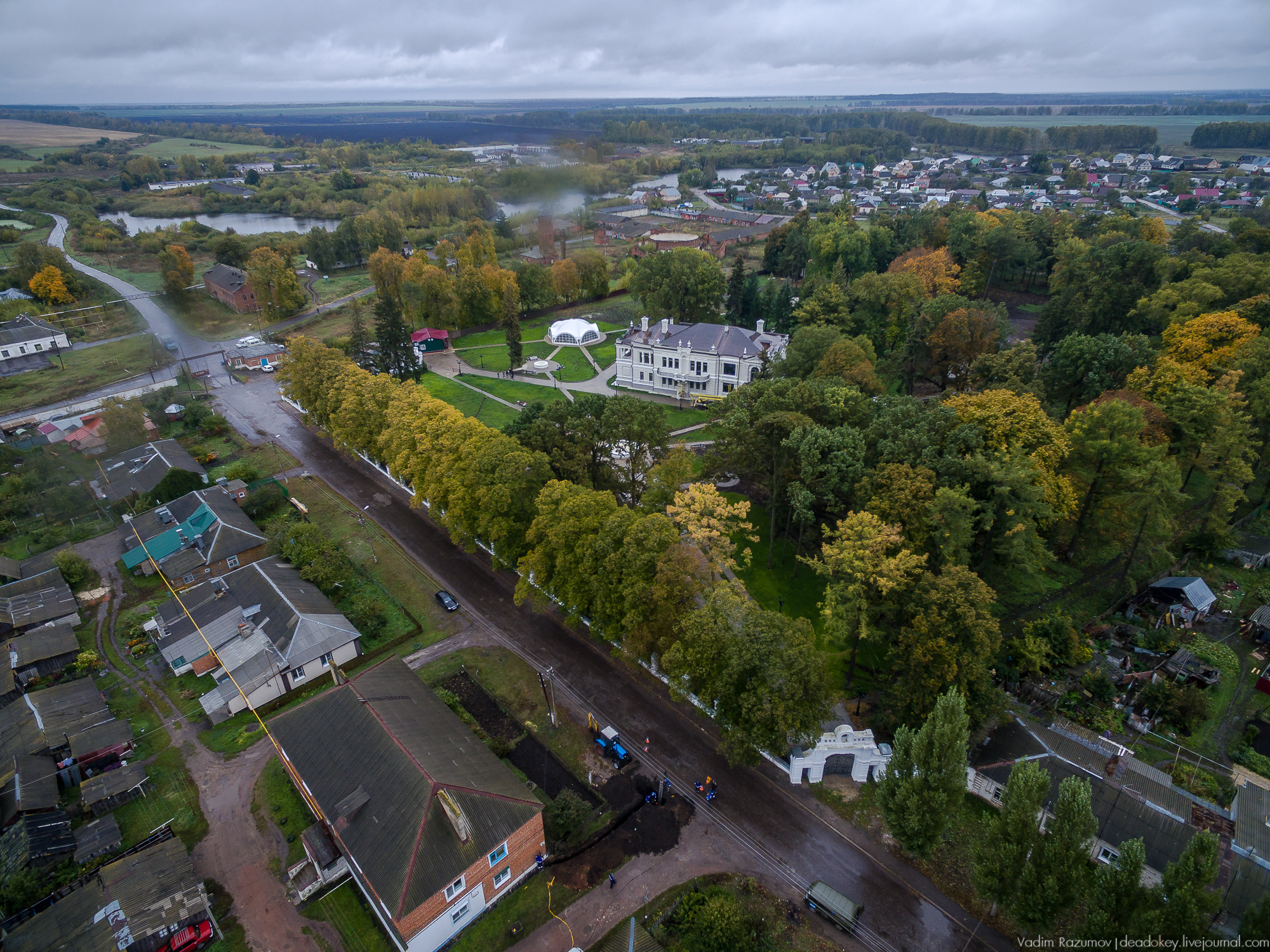

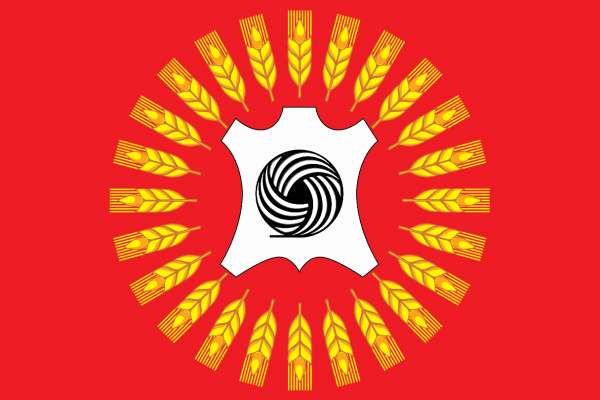
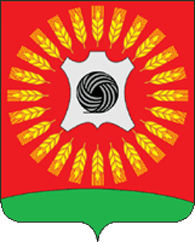
- Flag Coat of arms
- Interactive map of Rasskazovo
- Location of Rasskazovo Rasskazovo (Tambov Oblast)
- Coordinates: 52°40′N 41°53′E
- Country: Russia
- Federal subject: Tambov Oblast
- Founded: 1698
- Town status since: 1926
- Elevation: 150 m (490 ft)

Population (2010 Census)
  - Total: 45,484
  - Estimate (2025): 46,264 (+1.7%)

Administrative status
  - Subordinated to: town of oblast significance of Rasskazovo
  - Capital of: Rasskazovsky District, town of oblast significance of Rasskazovo

Municipal status
  - Urban okrug: Rasskazovo Urban Okrug
  - Capital of: Rasskazovo Urban Okrug, Rasskazovsky Municipal District
- Time zone: UTC+3 (MSK)
- Postal code: 431590
- OKTMO ID: 68725000001

Rasskazovo (Russian: Расска́зово) is a town in Tambov Oblast, Russia, located on the Lesnoy Tambov River (Tsna's tributary) at its confluence with the Arzhenka River 40 kilometers (25 mi) east of Tambov. Population: 45,484 (2010 census); 46,516 (2002 census); 49,058 (1989 Soviet census).

== History ==
It was founded in 1698 and named after Stepan Rasskazov, a native of Morshansk and the first settler in the area. In the 18th–early 20th century, Rasskazovo was known for its cottage industries, such as stocking knitting, skin dressing, candle and soap production. In 1753, a cloth factory was built and later a dyeing manufactory. Rasskazovo was granted town status in 1926.

== Administrative and municipal status ==
Within the framework of administrative divisions, Rasskazovo serves as the administrative center of Rasskazovsky District, even though it is not a part of it. As an administrative division, it is incorporated separately as the town of oblast significance of Rasskazovo—an administrative unit with the status equal to that of the districts. As a municipal division, the town of oblast significance of Rasskazovo is incorporated as Rasskazovo Urban Okrug.
