= Pervomaysky District, Tambov Oblast =

Pervomaysky District Первомайский район (Russian)
- District
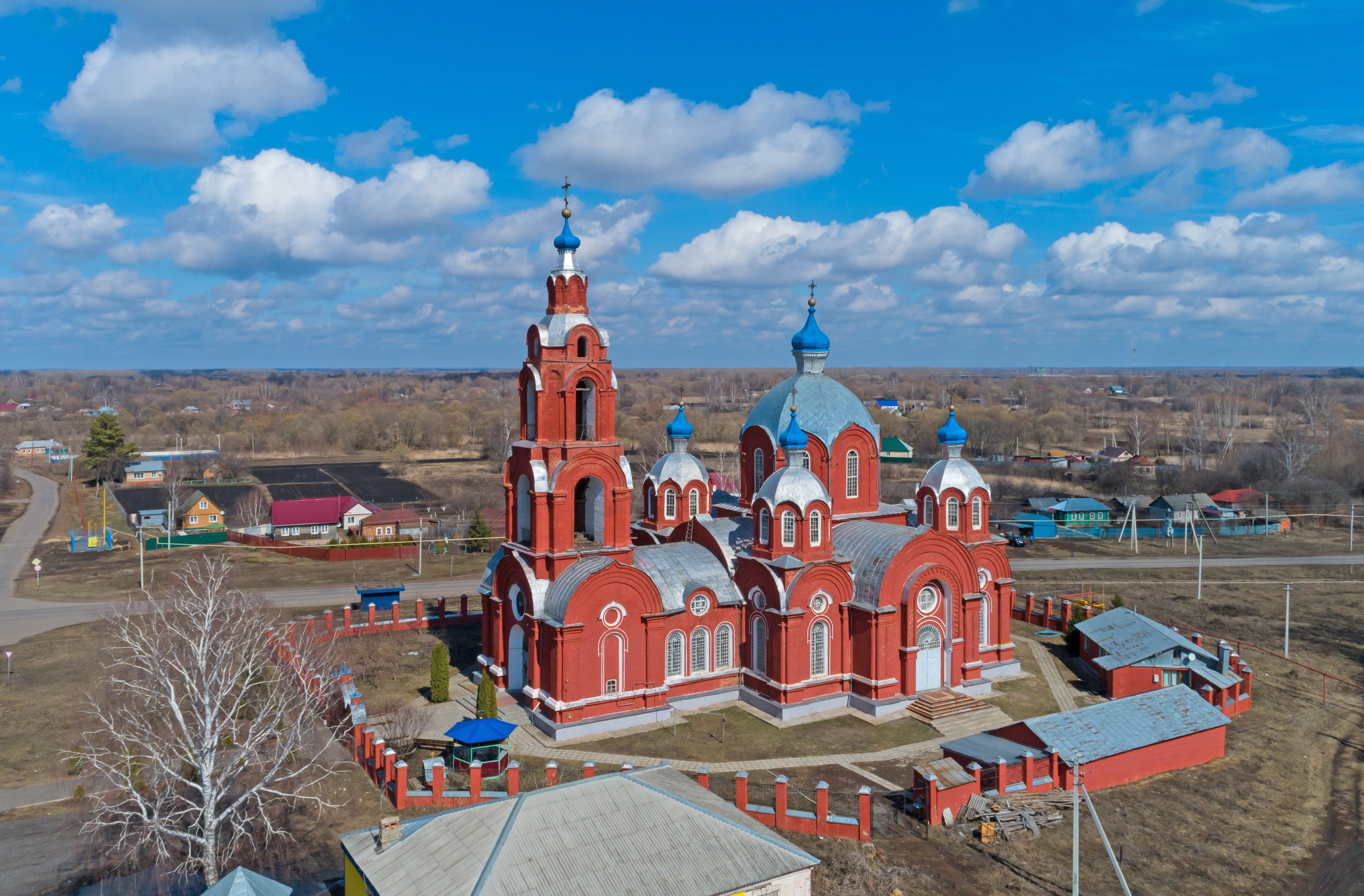
- St Michael's Church in Staroseslavino

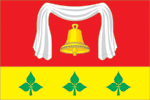
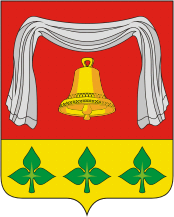
- Flag Coat of arms
- Location of Pervomaysky District in Tambov Oblast
- Coordinates: 53°14′33″N 40°17′12″E
- Country: Russia
- Federal subject: Tambov Oblast
- Established: 1935
- Administrative center: Pervomaysky

Area
  - Total: 941 km^{2} (363 sq mi)

Population (2010 Census)
  - Total: 29,277
  - Density: 31.1/km^{2} (80.6/sq mi)
  - Urban: 43.2%
  - Rural: 56.8%

Administrative structure
  - Administrative divisions: 1 Settlement councils, 10 Selsoviets
  - Inhabited localities: 1 urban-type settlements, 44 rural localities

Municipal structure
  - Municipally incorporated as: Pervomaysky Municipal District
  - Municipal divisions: 1 urban settlements, 10 rural settlements
- Time zone: UTC+3 (MSK)
- OKTMO ID: 68622000

Pervomaysky District (Russian: Первома́йский райо́н) is an administrative and municipal district (raion), one of the twenty-three in Tambov Oblast, Russia. It is located in the northwest of the oblast. The area of the district is 941 square kilometers (363 sq mi). Its administrative center is the urban locality (a work settlement) of Pervomaysky. Population: 29,277 (2010 Census); 31,925 (2002 census); 35,948 (1989 Soviet census). The population of the administrative center accounts for 43.2% of the district's total population.

== Geography ==
Pervomaysky District is on the northwestern border of Tambov Oblast, with Lipetsk Oblast to its west and Ryazan Oblast to the north. It is about 75 km northwest of the city of Tambov, and 60 km northeast of Lipetsk. The terrain is flat, with altitude above sea level between 130 and 160 meters. Aside from agricultural land, the predominant vegetation is pine forest, with some birch and alder.

The district is about 40 km north–south and 30 km west–east. The administrative center of the district is the city of Pervomaysky. The M6 ("Caspian") highway that connects Moscow to the Caspian runs north-south across the middle of the district. Subdivisions of the district include 10 urban and rural settlements.

As of January 2016, the three largest towns are Pervomaysky (pop. 11,910), Khobotova (pop. 2,786), and Novospasskoye (pop. 2,733). To the north, the area is bordered by Alexandro-Nevsky District of Ryazan Oblast, in the east by Staroyuryevsky District, in the south by Michurinsky District, and in the west by Chaplyginsky District of Lipetsk Oblast.

=== Climate ===
Average January temperature is −10.1 °C (13.8 °F), and average July temperature is 20 °C (68 °F). Annual precipitation is 553 millimeters (21.8 in). The climate is Humid continental climate, cool summer, (Dfb). This climate is characterized by large swings in temperature, both diurnally and seasonally, with mild summers and cold, snowy winters.

== History ==
Significant settlement in Pervomaysky began in 1635, with the building of the Belgorod Line, and the expansion of the fort as Kozlov (now the town of Michurinsky, 20 km to the south). The Belgorod Line of forts blocked the raids of the Tatars from the south. Because Kozlov was the northernmost anchor point, the Pervomaysky district benefited from not only the construction and garrison activity, but also the safety. Protected y the new fortifications, colonists moved into the area.

In 1866, the "Ryazan-Kozlov" line of the South East Railway was laid through the district, on which the Bogoyavlansk station was built.

== Agriculture ==
Petrovsky is an agricultural district, both crops and livestock. The primary crops are barley, sunflower and wheat. Approximately 26,418 hectares (28%) of the total area of the district is in cultivation for crops. Vegetables account for only 206 ha (less than 1%). Livestock contributes about 20% of agricultural revenues, centered on dairy, poultry, and cattle.

In 2014, the top seven crops by area were:

Crop	Cultivated Area (ha)	% of Cultivated Area
Summer Barley	6,778	26
Sunflower grain	6,585	25
Winter Wheat	6,531	25
Potatoes	2,495	10
Corn for grain	1,911	7
Sugar beet (factory)	609	2
Winter rye	338	1

== Transportation ==
The Michurinsk-Gryazi line of the South Easter Railway crosses Pervomaysky District through the town of Pervomaysky, with station 'Bogoyavlensk'. Detailed route map of South East Railway (in Russian) The European route E119 from Moscow to Tambov runs north-south across the middle of the district. The Urengoy–Pomary–Uzhhorod pipeline also runs through Pervomaysky.
