= Novaya Lyada =

Novaya Lyada Новая Ляда
- Urban-type settlement
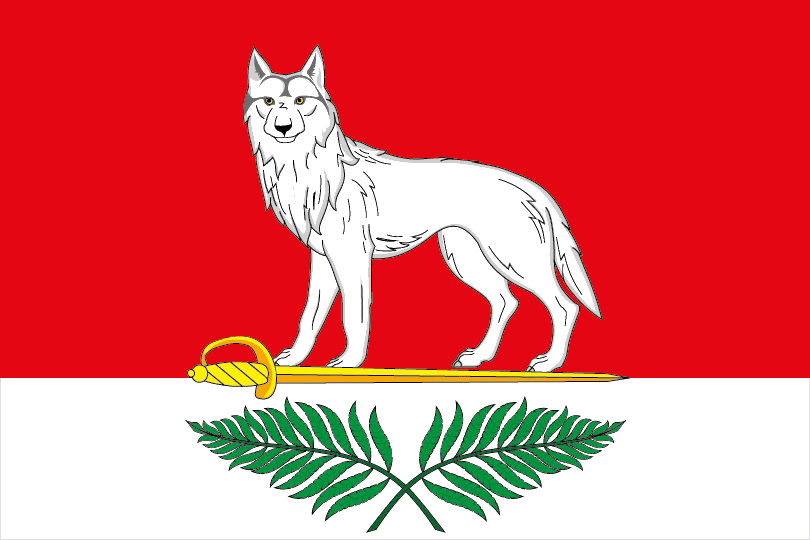
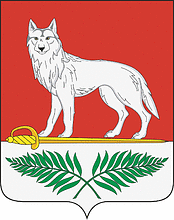
- Flag Coat of arms
- Interactive map of Novaya Lyada
- Location of Novaya Lyada Novaya Lyada (Tambov Oblast)
- Coordinates: 52.7094°N 41.6521°E
- Country: Russia
- Federal subject: Tambov Oblast
- Administrative district: Tambovsky District
- Elevation: 157 m (515 ft)

Population (2010 Census)
  - Total: 5,207
  - Estimate (2021): 5,548 (+6.5%)
- Time zone: UTC+3 (MSK)
- Postal code: 392515
- OKTMO ID: 68640158051

Novaya Lyada (Russian: Новая Ляда) is an urban locality (an urban-type settlement) in Tambovsky District of Tambov Oblast, Russia. Population: 5,207 (2010 census); 4,997 (2002 census); 4,820 (1989 Soviet census).

== Archeology ==
Lyadinsky burial ground is an archaeological monument of ancient Moksha of the 8th-11th centuries near the village of Novaya Lyada, Tambov District, Tambov Region. Discovered in 1869 during the construction of the railway. Drawings of some of the finds were published in 1878. Later, the Lyadinsky burial ground was excavated by V.N. Yastrebov (1888) and R.F. Voronina (1983-85). 221 burials have been explored. The finds characterize the burial customs and material culture of the Middle Tsnin Moksha in the early Middle Ages. According to the predominance of the orientation of the buried with their heads to the south (sometimes with a deviation to the west or east), the Lyadinsky burial ground is related to the later Moksha burial grounds. 18% of burials were made according to the rite of cremation. Jewelry typical of Moksha was found in many female graves: temporal pendants with a bipyramidal or teardrop-shaped weight, pulokeri, sulgams, etc. Household equipment is represented by working axes, adzes, harpoons, crochet hooks, whorls, lyacs – foundry ladles. Weapons and hunting items are varied: saber, battle axes, spearheads and arrowheads. Oriental silver coins, a bronze bucket with an Arabic inscription, rich belt sets testify to the trade relations of ancient Moksha.
