= Tambovsky District, Tambov Oblast =

Tambovsky District Тамбовский район (Russian)
- District
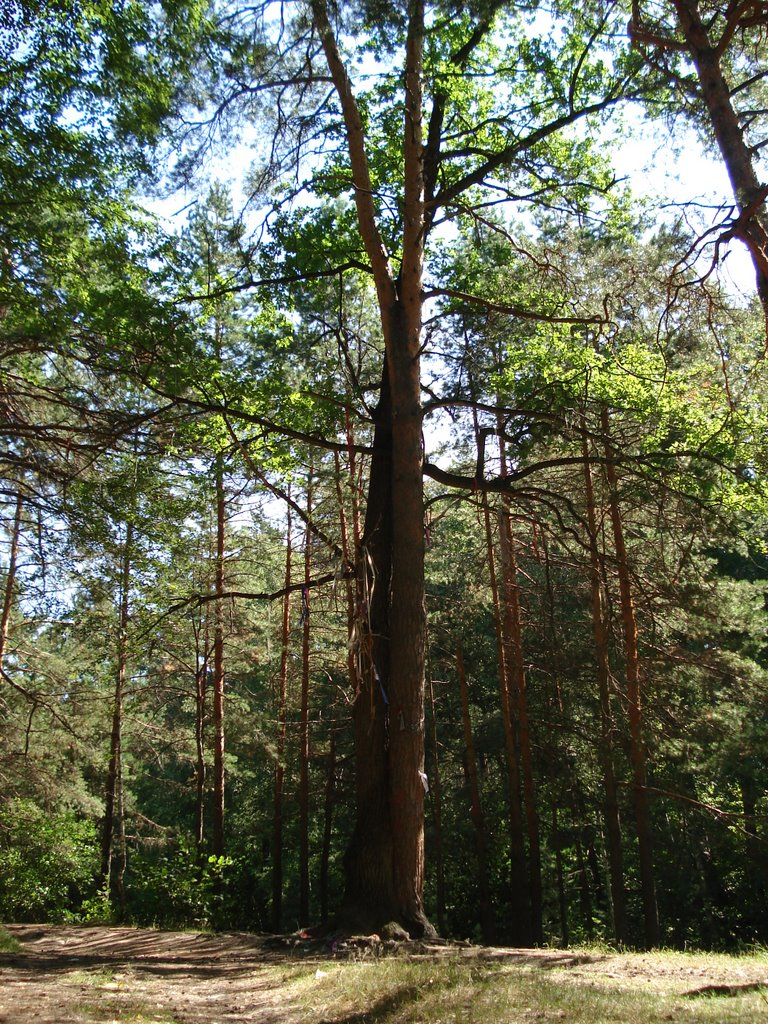
- Tree of Love, Tambovsky District

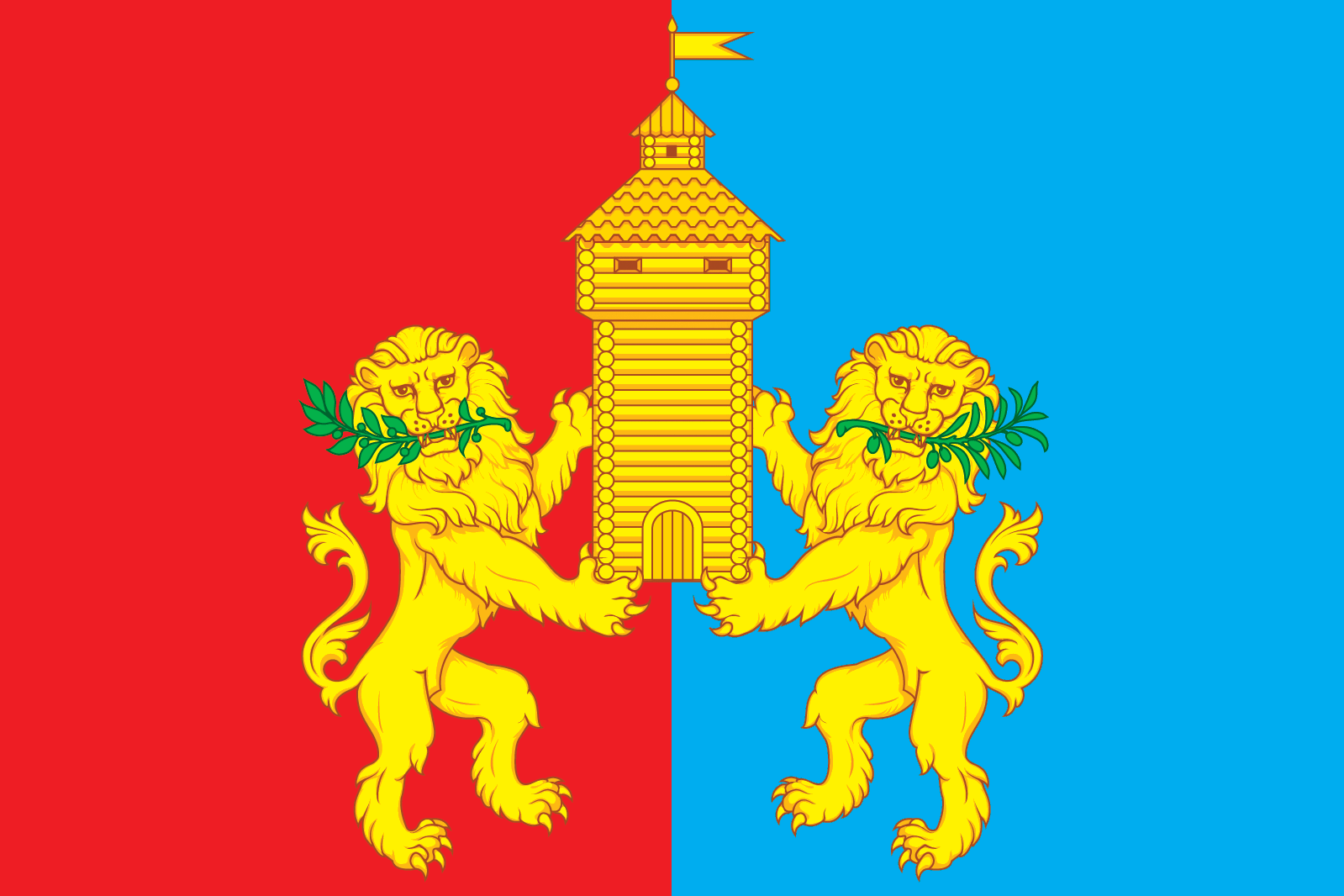
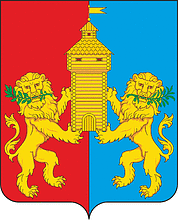
- Flag Coat of arms
- Location of Tambovsky District in Tambov Oblast
- Coordinates: 52°43′N 41°25′E
- Country: Russia
- Federal subject: Tambov Oblast
- Established: 16 June 1928
- Administrative center: Tambov

Area
  - Total: 2,632 km^{2} (1,016 sq mi)

Population (2010 Census)
  - Total: 102,786
  - Density: 39.05/km^{2} (101.1/sq mi)
  - Urban: 5.1%
  - Rural: 94.9%

Administrative structure
  - Administrative divisions: 1 Settlement councils, 25 Selsoviets
  - Inhabited localities: 1 urban-type settlements, 136 rural localities

Municipal structure
  - Municipally incorporated as: Tambovsky Municipal District
  - Municipal divisions: 1 urban settlements, 25 rural settlements
- Time zone: UTC+3 (MSK)
- OKTMO ID: 68640000
- Website: http://r00.tambov.gov.ru/

Tambovsky District (Russian: Тамбо́вский райо́н) is an administrative and municipal district (raion), one of the twenty-three in Tambov Oblast, Russia. It is located in the center of the oblast. The district borders with Sosnovsky District in the north, Rasskazovsky District in the east, Znamensky District in the south, and with Nikiforovsky District in the west. The area of the district is 2,632 square kilometers (1,016 sq mi). Its administrative center is the city of Tambov (which is not administratively a part of the district). Population: 102,786 (2010 Census); 102,018 (2002 census); 80,793 (1989 Soviet census).

== Administrative and municipal status ==
Within the framework of administrative divisions, Tambovsky District is one of the twenty-three in the oblast. The city of Tambov serves as its administrative center, despite being incorporated separately as a city of oblast significance—an administrative unit with the status equal to that of the districts.

As a municipal division, the district is incorporated as Tambovsky Municipal District. The city of oblast significance of Tambov is incorporated separately from the district as Tambov Urban Okrug.
