= Tamara Pletnyova =

Russian politician

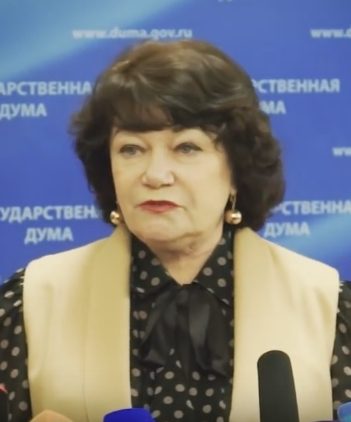
Journalists were addressed by the chairman of the State Duma committee on family issues Tamara Pletnyova

Tamara Vasilyevna Pletnyova (Russian: Тама́ра Васи́льевна Плетнёва; née Shtrak, born November 22, 1947, Novodubrovskoe, Novosibirsk Oblast, RSFSR, USSR) is a Russian politician.

Deputy of the State Duma of the first (1993–1995), the second (1995–1999), the third (1999–2003), the fourth (2003–2007), the fifth (2007–2011), the sixth (2011–2016) and seventh convocations (2016-2021), a member of the Communist Party faction, member of the Permanent Commission of the CIS Interparliamentary Assembly on social policy and human rights and the chairwoman of the Family, Women, and Children Affairs Committee in the State Duma.

In 2012, Pletnyova opposed the mentioning of Jews on a memorial plaque for victims of the Holocaust in the city of Rostov-on-Don, saying that Russians should "forget our bitterness and live in peace...The memorial should commemorate all the war victims...the Soviet Union saved Jews, Russians saved Jews...so why single out Jews? We shouldn't single out any ethnic group."

In March 2019, Pletnyova has called gays "sick" people who "must be cured".

In 2020, Pletnyova called for a law that would tax on childless couples (Russia used to have that tax from 1941-1990).
