= Muchkapsky District =

Muchkapsky District Мучкапский район
- District
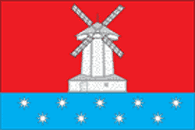
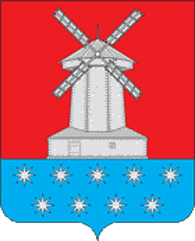
- Flag Coat of arms
- Location of Muchkapsky District in Tambov Oblast
- Coordinates: 51°51′06″N 42°27′45″E
- Country: Russia
- Federal subject: Tambov Oblast
- Established: 14 May 1928
- Administrative center: Muchkapsky

Area
  - Total: 1,181 km^{2} (456 sq mi)

Population (2010 Census)
  - Total: 15,177
  - Density: 12.85/km^{2} (33.28/sq mi)
  - Urban: 46.6%
  - Rural: 53.4%

Administrative structure
  - Administrative divisions: 1 Settlement councils, 7 Selsoviets
  - Inhabited localities: 1 urban-type settlements, 43 rural localities

Municipal structure
  - Municipally incorporated as: Muchkapsky Municipal District
  - Municipal divisions: 1 urban settlements, 7 rural settlements
- Time zone: UTC+3 (MSK)
- OKTMO ID: 68618000
- Website: http://r46.tambov.gov.ru/

Muchkapsky District (Russian: Мучка́пский райо́н) is an administrative and municipal district (raion), one of the twenty-three in Tambov Oblast, Russia. It is located in the southeast of the oblast. The district borders with Inzhanovsky District in the north, Romanovsky District of Saratov Oblast in the east, Gribanovsky District of Voronezh Oblast in the south, and with Uvarovsky District in the west. The area of the district is 1,181 square kilometers (456 sq mi). Its administrative center is the urban locality (a work settlement) of Muchkapsky. Population: 15,177 (2010 Census); 18,257 (2002 Census); 20,746 (1989 Soviet census). The population of the administrative center accounts for 46.6% of the district's total population.

== Notable residents ==
- Tamara Frolova (born 1959), politician
