= Umyotsky District =

Umyotsky District Умётский район (Russian)
- District
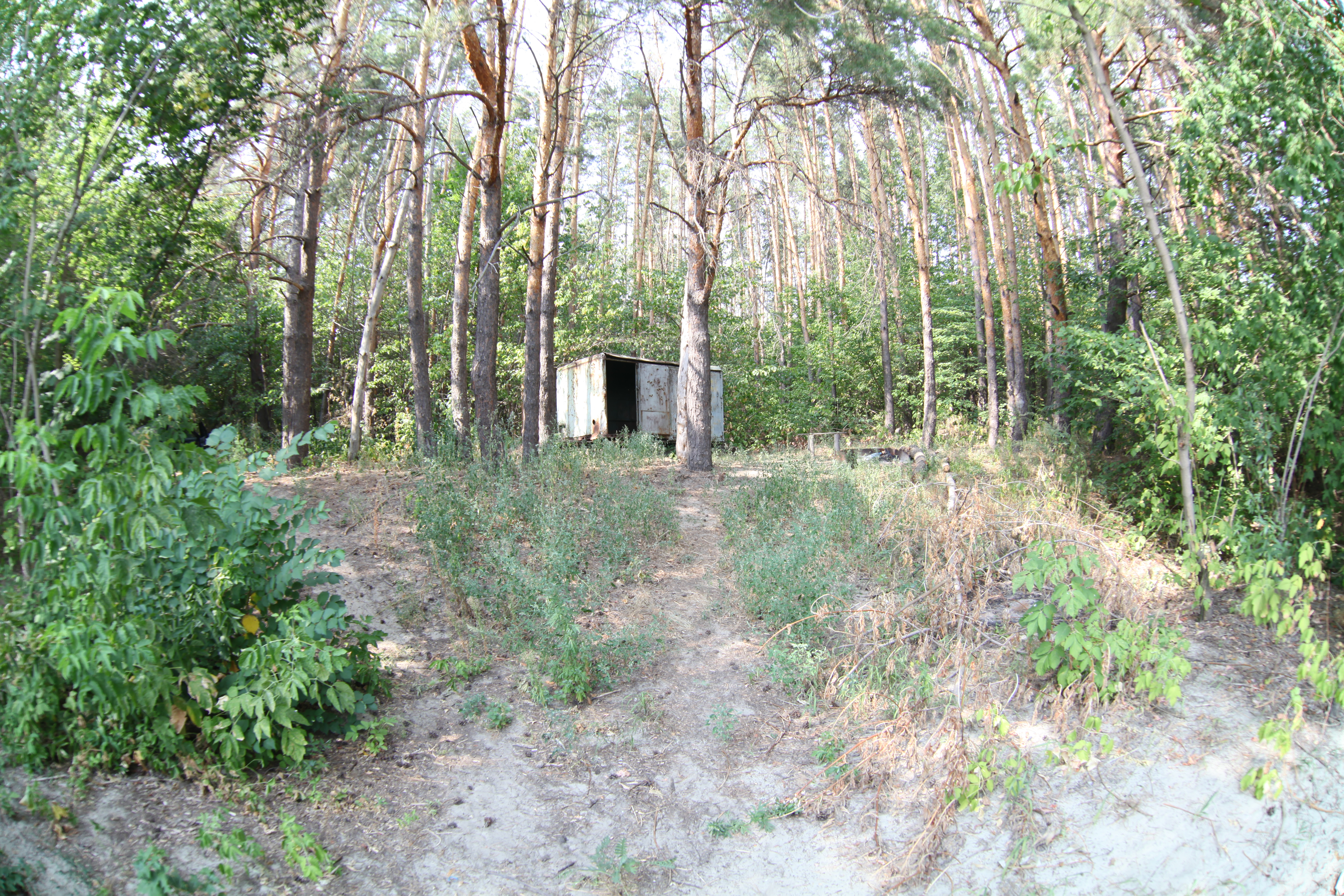
- Forest in Umyotsky District

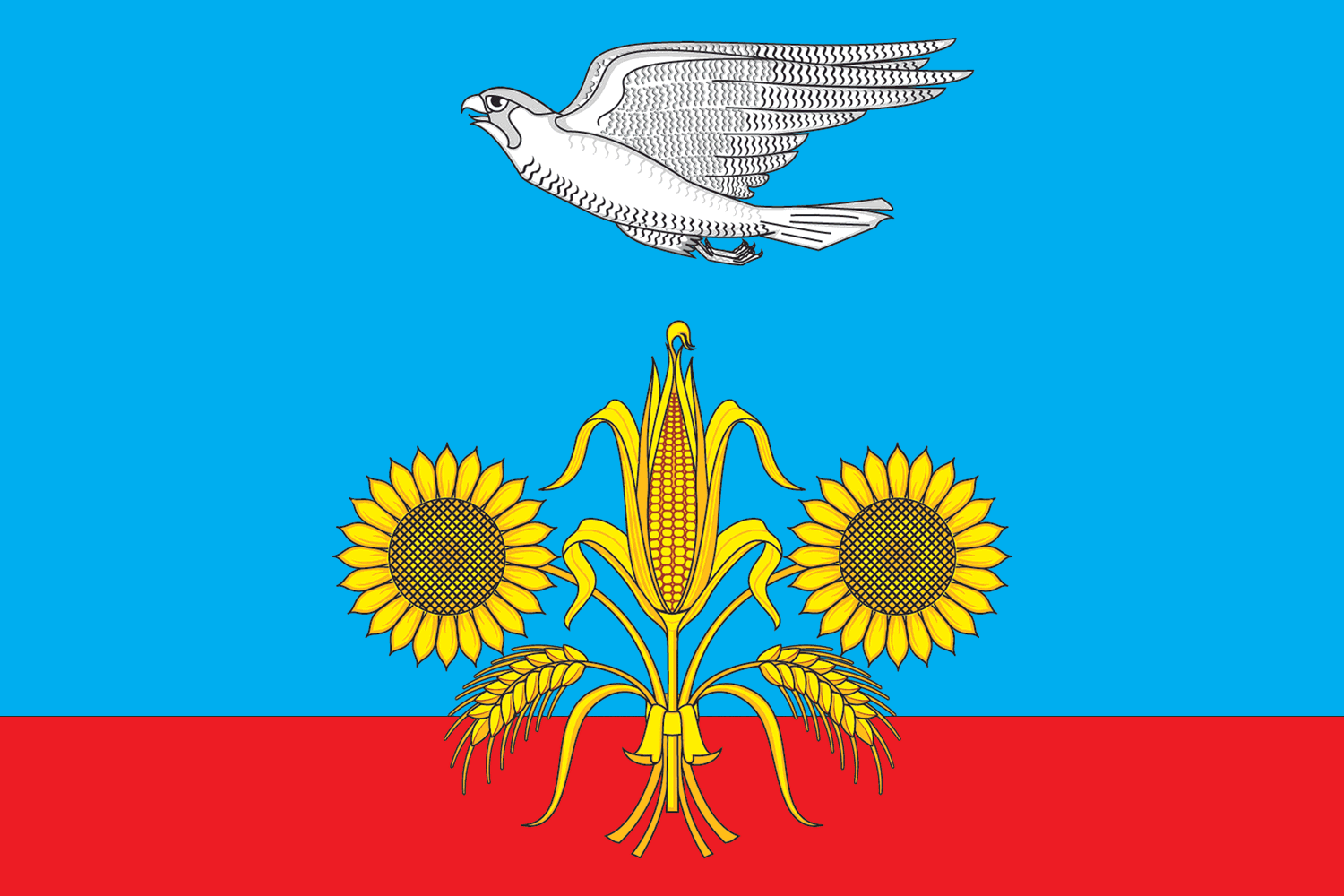
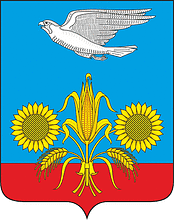
- Flag Coat of arms
- Location of Umyotsky District in Tambov Oblast
- Coordinates: 52°34′02″N 42°58′34″E
- Country: Russia
- Federal subject: Tambov Oblast
- Established: 1935
- Administrative center: Umyot

Area
  - Total: 1,097 km^{2} (424 sq mi)

Population (2010 Census)
  - Total: 12,044
  - Density: 10.98/km^{2} (28.44/sq mi)
  - Urban: 39.4%
  - Rural: 60.6%

Administrative structure
  - Administrative divisions: 1 Settlement councils, 8 Selsoviets
  - Inhabited localities: 1 urban-type settlements, 54 rural localities

Municipal structure
  - Municipally incorporated as: Umyotsky Municipal District
  - Municipal divisions: 1 urban settlements, 8 rural settlements
- Time zone: UTC+3 (MSK)
- OKTMO ID: 68646000
- Website: http://r59.tmbreg.ru/

Umyotsky District (Russian: Умётский райо́н) is an administrative and municipal district (raion), one of the twenty-three in Tambov Oblast, Russia. It is located in the east of the oblast. The district borders with Gavrilovsky District in the north, Tamalinsky District of Penza Oblast in the east, Inzhavinsky District in the south, and with Kirsanovsky District in the west. The area of the district is 1,097 square kilometers (424 sq mi). Its administrative center is the urban locality (a work settlement) of Umyot. Population: 12,044 (2010 Census); 13,545 (2002 census); 15,228 (1989 Soviet census). The population of Umyot accounts for 39.4% of the district's total population.

== Notable residents ==
- Metropolitan Benjamin (1880–1961), Orthodox missionary and bishop, born in the village of Vazhki (Ilyinka)
- Mikhail Khozin (1896–1979), Soviet general, born in the village of Skachikha
