= Tamara Frolova =

Russian politician (born 1959)

- Тамара Фролова
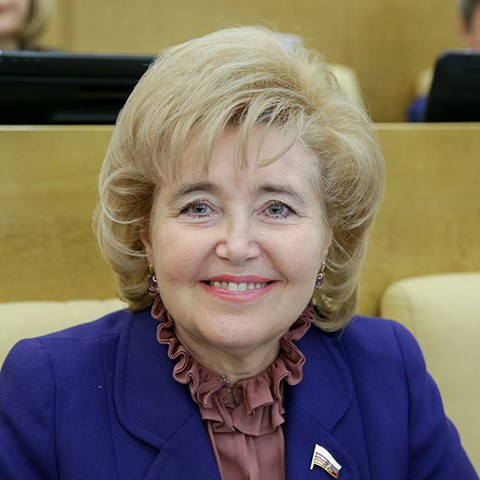
- Tamara Frolova in 2016

Member of the State Duma
- Incumbent
- Assumed office 2016

Personal details
- Born: 2 November 1959 (age 66) Russia
- Party: United Russia

Tamara Ivanovna Frolova (born 2 November 1959) is a Russian politician from United Russia.

== Education ==
Graduated from Volgograd State Medical University.

== Political career ==
She was elected to the State Duma in 2016. She was re-elected in 2021. She was named in the Panama Papers.

=== Awards ===
She has been awarded the honorary title “Honored Healthcare Worker of the Russian Federation.”

She has also received the departmental badges “Excellence in Healthcare,” “For Labor Achievements,” and “For Services to the Tambov Region.”

=== Sanctions ===
She is one of the members of the State Duma the United States Treasury sanctioned on 24 March 2022 in response to the 2022 Russian invasion of Ukraine.

She was sanctioned by the UK government in 2022 in relation to the Russo-Ukrainian War.
