= Pichayevsky District =

Pichayevsky District Пичаевский район (Russian)
- District
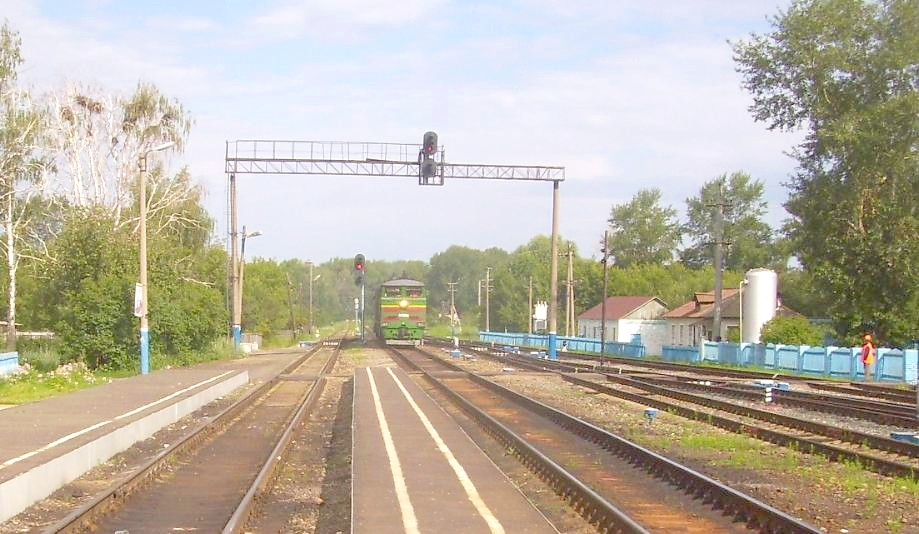
- Vernadovka Station, Syzran-Vyazma railway.

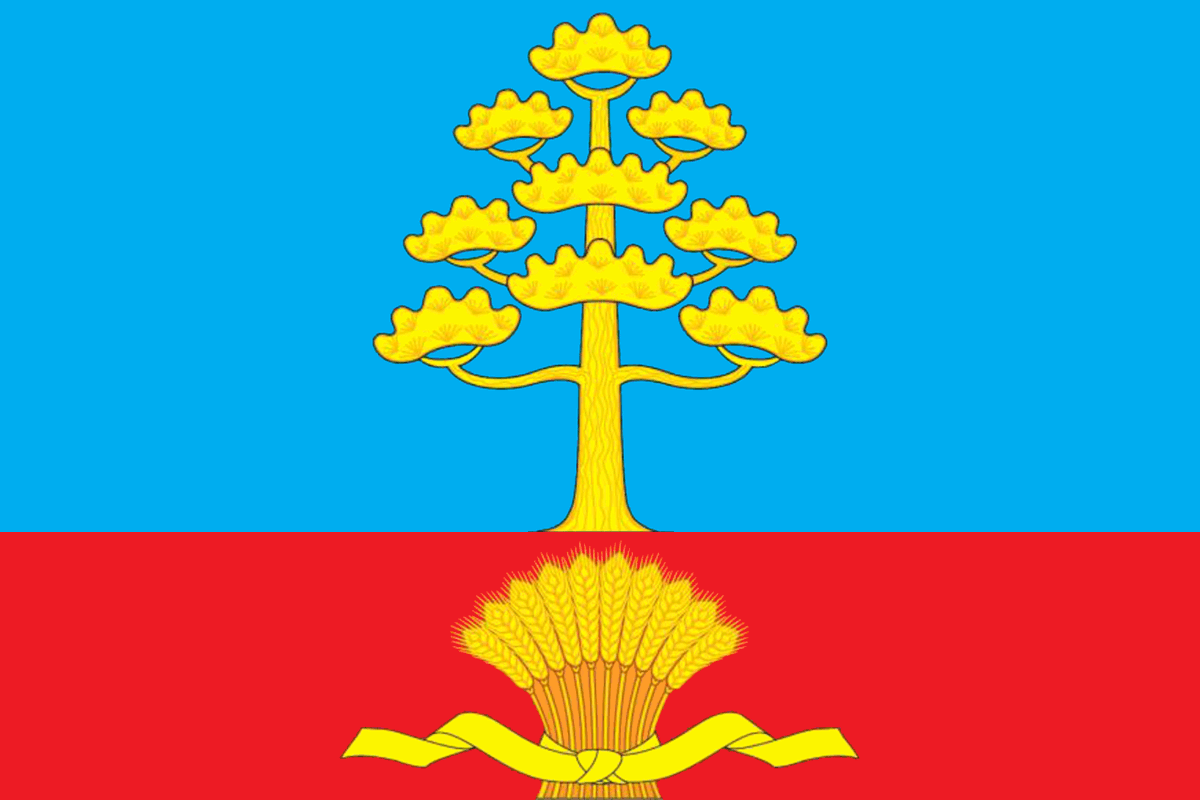
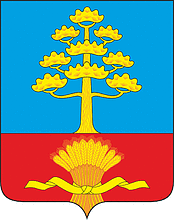
- Flag Coat of arms
- Location of Pichayevsky District in Tambov Oblast
- Coordinates: 53°14′06″N 42°12′06″E
- Country: Russia
- Federal subject: Tambov Oblast
- Established: 30 July 1928
- Administrative center: Pichayevo

Area
  - Total: 1,294 km^{2} (500 sq mi)

Population (2010 Census)
  - Total: 14,027
  - Density: 10.84/km^{2} (28.08/sq mi)
  - Urban: 0%
  - Rural: 100%

Administrative structure
  - Administrative divisions: 10 selsoviet
  - Inhabited localities: 60 rural localities

Municipal structure
  - Municipally incorporated as: Pichayevsky Municipal District
  - Municipal divisions: 0 urban settlements, 10 rural settlements
- Time zone: UTC+3 (MSK)
- OKTMO ID: 68626000
- Website: http://r54.tambov.gov.ru/

Pichayevsky District (Russian: Пича́евский райо́н) is an administrative and municipal district (raion), one of the twenty-three in Tambov Oblast, Russia. It is located in the northeast of the oblast. The district borders with Morshansky District in the north, Zemetchinsky District of Penza Oblast in the east, Bondarsky District in the south, and with Sosnovsky District in the west. The area of the district is 1,294 square kilometers (500 sq mi). Its administrative center is the rural locality (a selo) of Pichayevo. Population: 14,027 (2010 Census); 16,542 (2002 census); 19,407 (1989 Soviet census). The population of Pichayevo accounts for 24.3% of the district's total population.

== Geography ==
Pichayevsky District is in the north-east of Tambov Oblast, about 50 km northeast of the city of Tambov, and 15 km southeast of Morshansk. Three rivers run south to north through the district: the Kersha, the Big Lomovis, and the Kashma. 76.4% of the area is employed agriculture; the soils are chernozems (black earth). Forests cover 17.9% of territory (mostly on the west side), with cover of pine, oak, birch and aspen.

The district is roughly triangular in shape, measuring about 35 km north–south and 50 km west–east across the base. The administrative center of the district is the city of Pichaevo. Subdivisions of the district include 10 rural settlements.

As of January, 2016, the three largest towns are Pichaevo (pop. 3,587), Baylovsky (pop. 1,443), and Lipovskii (pop. 1,244). To the north, the area is bordered by Morshansky District, in the east by Bashmakovsky District in Penza Oblast, in the south by Bondarsky District and Gavrilovsky District, and in the west by Sosnovsky District.

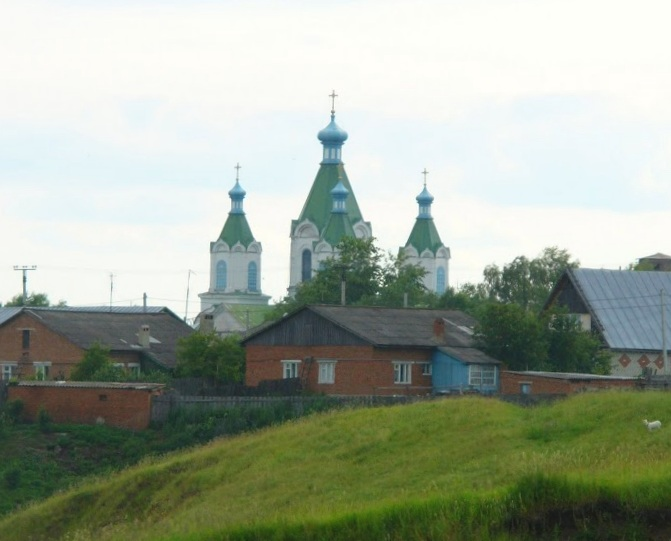
Holy Trinity Church in Pichaevo, Pichayevsky District

=== Climate ===
Average January temperature in the district is −11 °C (12 °F), and average July temperature is 15.5 °C (59.9 °F). Annual precipitation is 475 millimeters (18.7 in)-500 millimeters (20 in), and falls mostly in April through October. The climate is Humid continental climate, cool summer, (Dfb). This climate is characterized by large swings in temperature, both diurnally and seasonally, with mild summers and cold, snowy winters. The growing season in Pichayevsky District lasts 179 to 182 days.

== Economy ==
Employment in the district is focused on agriculture and light industry.

=== Transportation ===
The Murshansk-Syzran stretch of the Kuybyshev Railway runs across the northern tip of the district, with one station - the - within the boundaries. Another portion of the Kuyyshev runs through the northeast section, with a stop at the Vietinghoff station.
