= Michurinsk =

Town in Tambov Oblast, Russia

Michurinsk Мичуринск
- Town
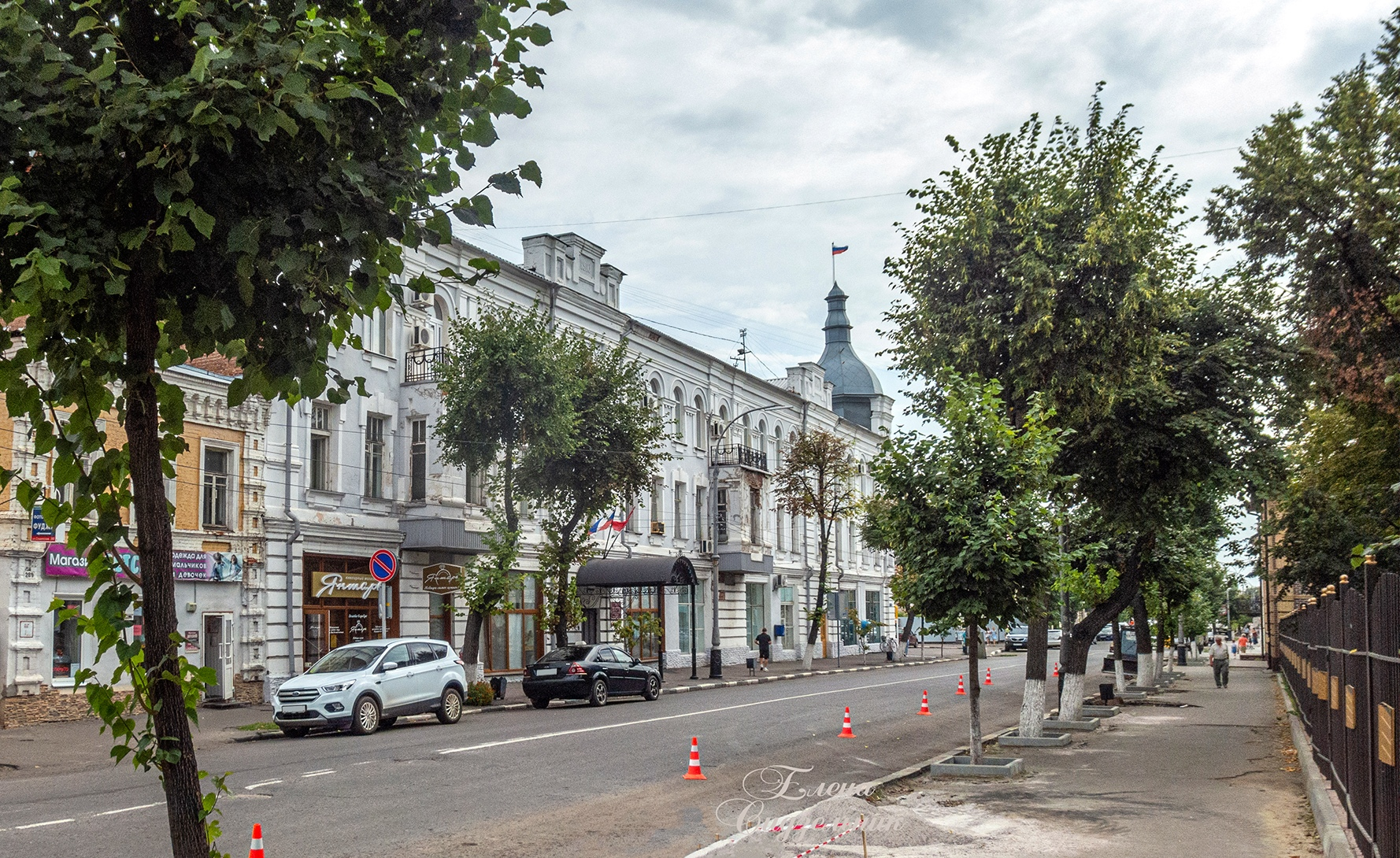
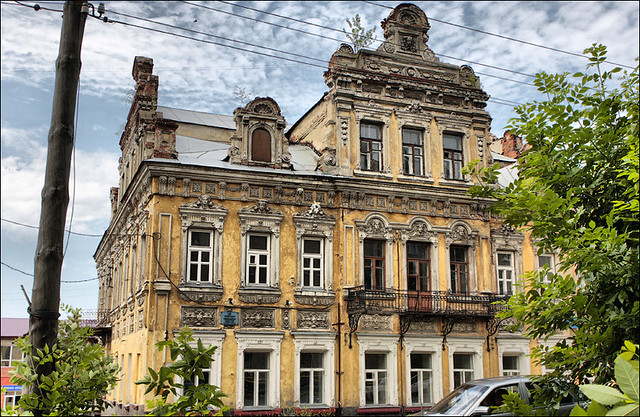

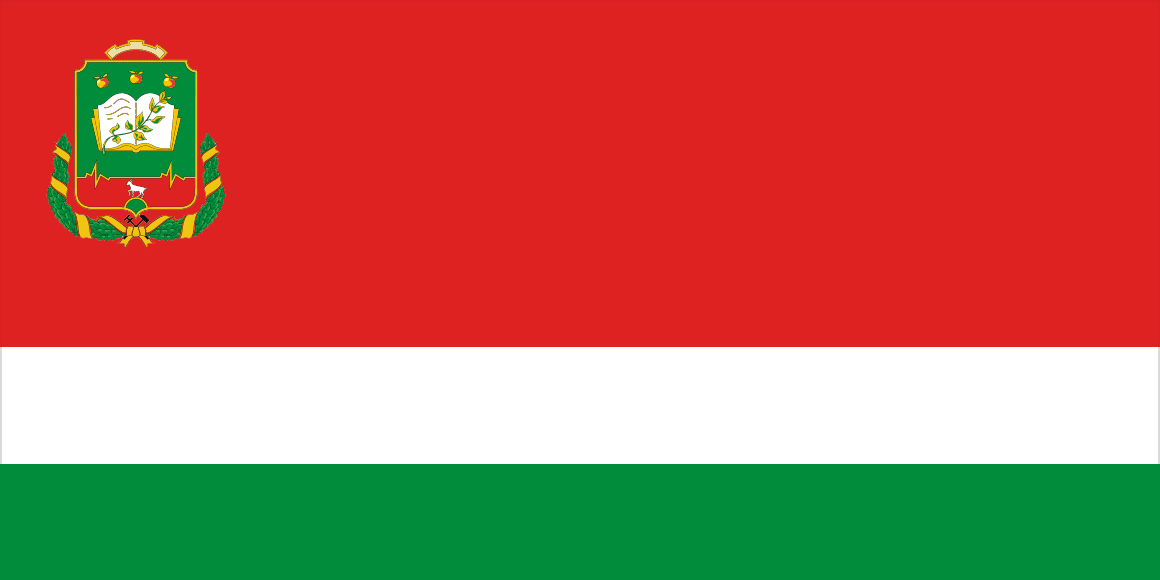
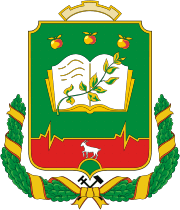
- Flag Coat of arms
- Interactive map of Michurinsk
- Location of Michurinsk Michurinsk (Tambov Oblast)
- Coordinates: 52°53′N 40°29′E
- Country: Russia
- Federal subject: Tambov Oblast
- Founded: 1635
- Town status since: 1779
- Elevation: 150 m (490 ft)

Population (2010 Census)
  - Total: 98,758
  - Estimate (2025): 87,914 (−11%)
  - Rank: 170th in 2010

Administrative status
  - Subordinated to: town of oblast significance of Michurinsk
  - Capital of: Michurinsky District, town of oblast significance of Michurinsk

Municipal status
  - Urban okrug: Michurinsk Urban Okrug
  - Capital of: Michurinsk Urban Okrug, Michurinsky Municipal District
- Time zone: UTC+3 (MSK)
- Postal code: 393760–393779
- OKTMO ID: 68715000001

Michurinsk (Russian: Мичу́ринск) is the second most populous town in Tambov Oblast, Russia. Population: 98,758 (2010 census); 96,093 (2002 census); 109,081 (1989 Soviet census).

== History ==
Originally known as Kozlov (Козло́в), its origin in a small monastery, founded in the forest in 1627. It became a settlement in 1635 at the northern end of the emerging Belgorod Line, a frontier defense line. A 25-kilometer (16 mi) earthen wall was built eastward across the open steppe effectively blocking the Nogai Trail, a Tatar raiding route. The success of this line led to the building of further lines further south. The settlement was granted town status in 1779.

Situated on the highway to Astrakhan and at the head of water communication with the Don, the town soon became a centre of trade.

The town was renamed Michurinsk in 1932 after the biologist Ivan Michurin, who had developed a genetic laboratory and agricultural testing fields in the Tambov region, dedicated to pomology (the study of fruit growing) and selection.

== Administrative and municipal status ==
Within the framework of administrative divisions, Michurinsk serves as the administrative center of Michurinsky District, even though it is not a part of it. As an administrative division, it is incorporated separately as the town of oblast significance of Michurinsk—an administrative unit with the status equal to that of the districts. As a municipal division, the town of oblast significance of Michurinsk is incorporated as Michurinsk Urban Okrug.

== Military ==
The town is home to Michurinsk air base.

== Notable people ==
- Sergei Sergeevich Brukhonenko (1890–1960), physician, biomedical scientist and technologist

== Twin towns – sister cities ==
Michurinsk is twinned with:

- Munster, Germany
- Smolyan, Bulgaria
