= Uvarovsky District =

Uvarovsky District Уваровский район (Russian)
- District
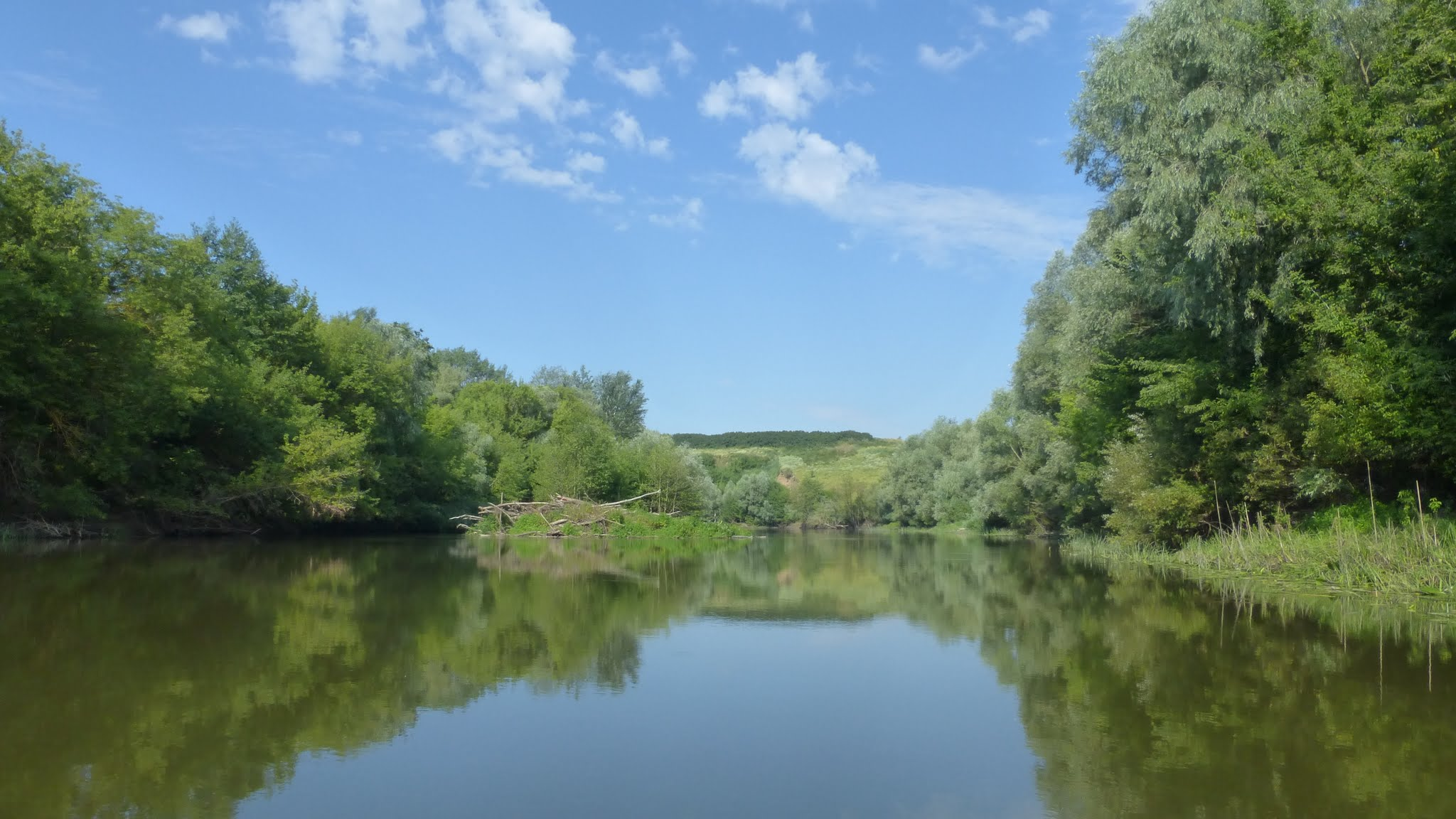
- Landscape in Uvarovsky District

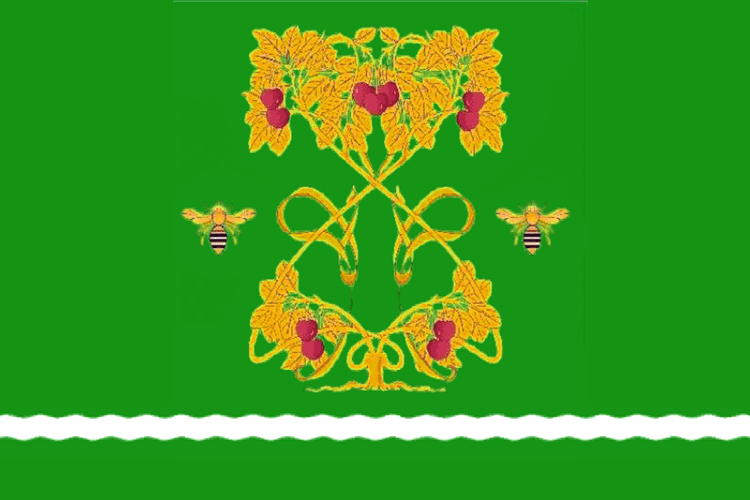
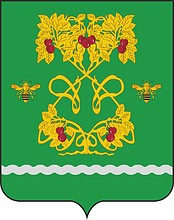
- Flag Coat of arms
- Location of Uvarovsky District in Tambov Oblast
- Coordinates: 51°59′N 42°16′E
- Country: Russia
- Federal subject: Tambov Oblast
- Established: 1928
- Administrative center: Uvarovo

Area
  - Total: 1,141 km^{2} (441 sq mi)

Population (2010 Census)
  - Total: 11,221
  - Density: 9.834/km^{2} (25.47/sq mi)
  - Urban: 0%
  - Rural: 100%

Administrative structure
  - Administrative divisions: 7 Selsoviets
  - Inhabited localities: 67 rural localities

Municipal structure
  - Municipally incorporated as: Uvarovsky Municipal District
  - Municipal divisions: 0 urban settlements, 7 rural settlements
- Time zone: UTC+3 (MSK)
- OKTMO ID: 68644000
- Website: http://r58.tambov.gov.ru/

Uvarovsky District (Russian: Ува́ровский райо́н) is an administrative and municipal district (raion), one of the twenty-three in Tambov Oblast, Russia. It is located in the southeast of the oblast. The district borders with Inzhavinsky District in the north, Muchkapsky District in the east, Gribanovsky District of Voronezh Oblast in the south, and with Zherdevsky District in the west. The area of the district is 1,141 square kilometers (441 sq mi). Its administrative center is the town of Uvarovo (which is not administratively a part of the district). Population: 11,221 (2010 Census); 12,737 (2002 census); 13,974 (1989 Soviet census).

== Administrative and municipal status ==
Within the framework of administrative divisions, Uvarovsky District is one of the twenty-three in the oblast. The town of Uvarovo serves as its administrative center, despite being incorporated separately as a town of oblast significance—an administrative unit with the status equal to that of the districts.

As a municipal division, the district is incorporated as Uvarovsky Municipal District. The town of oblast significance of Uvarovo is incorporated separately from the district as Uvarovo Urban Okrug.
