= Rasskazovsky District =

Rasskazovsky District Рассказовский район
- District
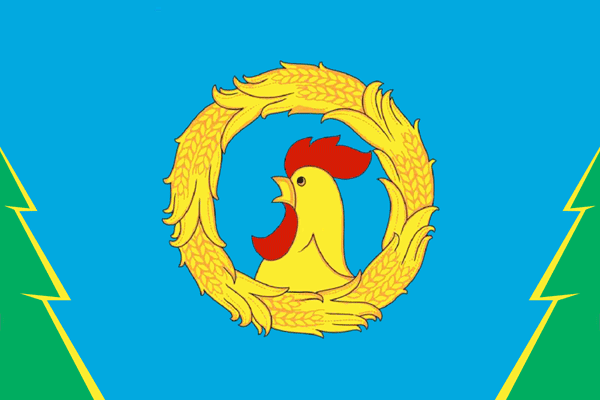
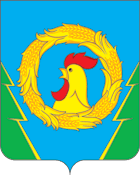
- Flag Coat of arms
- Location of Rasskazovsky District in Tambov Oblast
- Coordinates: 52°40′N 41°53′E
- Country: Russia
- Federal subject: Tambov Oblast
- Established: 28 July 1928
- Administrative center: Rasskazovo

Area
  - Total: 1,802 km^{2} (696 sq mi)

Population (2010 Census)
  - Total: 22,991
  - Density: 12.76/km^{2} (33.04/sq mi)
  - Urban: 0%
  - Rural: 100%

Administrative structure
  - Administrative divisions: 13 Selsoviets
  - Inhabited localities: 47 rural localities

Municipal structure
  - Municipally incorporated as: Rasskazovsky Municipal District
  - Municipal divisions: 0 urban settlements, 13 rural settlements
- Time zone: UTC+3 (MSK)
- OKTMO ID: 68628000
- Website: http://r31.tambov.gov.ru/

Rasskazovsky District (Russian: Рассказовский райо́н) is an administrative and municipal district (raion), one of the twenty-three in Tambov Oblast, Russia. It is located in the center of the oblast. The district borders with Bondarsky District in the north, Kirsanovsky District in the east, Sampursky District in the south, and with Tambovsky District in the west. The area of the district is 1,802 square kilometers (696 sq mi). Its administrative center is the town of Rasskazovo (which is not administratively a part of the district). Population: 22,991 (2010 Census); 24,984 (2002 Census); 25,422 (1989 Soviet census).

== Administrative and municipal status ==
Within the framework of administrative divisions, Rasskazovsky District is one of the twenty-three in the oblast. The town of Rasskazovo serves as its administrative center, despite being incorporated separately as a town of oblast significance—an administrative unit with the status equal to that of the districts.

As a municipal division, the district is incorporated as Rasskazovsky Municipal District. The town of oblast significance of Rasskazovo is incorporated separately from the district as Rasskazovo Urban Okrug.
