= Uvarovo, Tambov Oblast =

Town in Tambov Oblast, Russia

Uvarovo Уварово
- Town
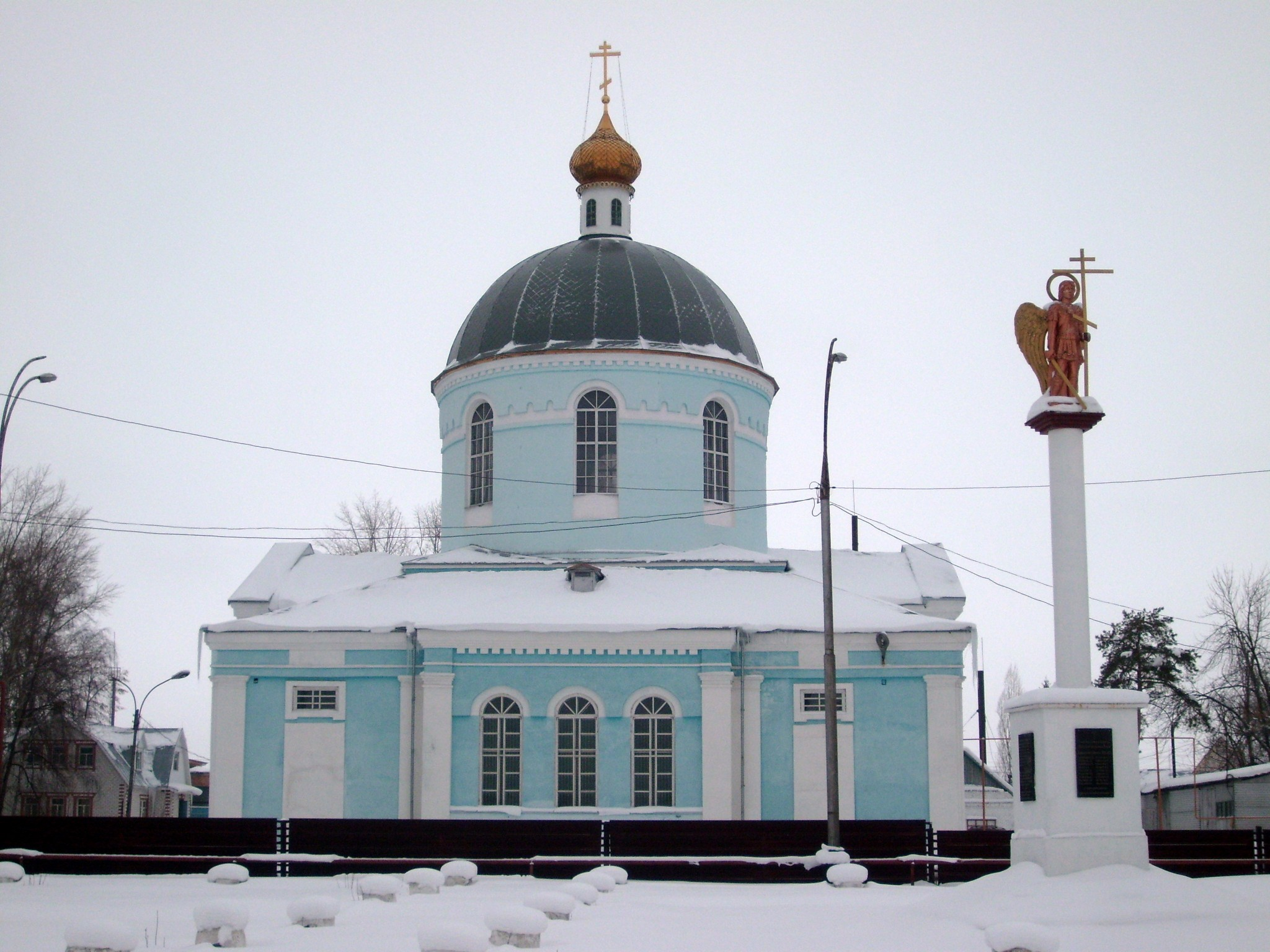

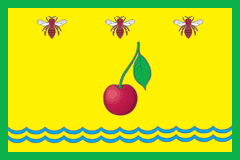
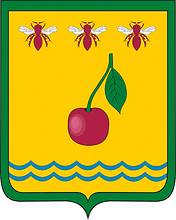
- Flag Coat of arms
- Interactive map of Uvarovo
- Location of Uvarovo Uvarovo (Tambov Oblast)
- Coordinates: 51°59′N 42°16′E
- Country: Russia
- Federal subject: Tambov Oblast
- Founded: 1699
- Town status since: 1966
- Elevation: 140 m (460 ft)

Population (2010 Census)
  - Total: 26,830
  - Estimate (2021): 23,584 (−12.1%)

Administrative status
  - Subordinated to: town of oblast significance of Uvarovo
  - Capital of: Uvarovsky District, town of oblast significance of Uvarovo

Municipal status
  - Urban okrug: Uvarovo Urban Okrug
  - Capital of: Uvarovo Urban Okrug, Uvarovsky Municipal District
- Time zone: UTC+3 (MSK)
- Postal code: 393460–393464
- OKTMO ID: 68730000001

Uvarovo (Russian: Ува́рово) is a town in Tambov Oblast, Russia, located on the right bank of the Vorona River (Don's basin), 117 kilometers (73 mi) southeast of Tambov. Population: 26,830 (2010 census); 29,690 (2002 census); 34,554 (1989 Soviet census).

== History ==
It was founded in 1699 as a Cossack settlement and became a selo in 1702. In 1770, a postal road was built through Uvarovo, which connected Borisoglebsk and Kirsanov. In the second half of the 19th–early 20th century, Uvarovo became an important commercial center. In 1960, it was granted urban-type settlement status and in 1966—town status.

== Administrative and municipal status ==
Within the framework of administrative divisions, Uvarovo serves as the administrative center of Uvarovsky District, even though it is not a part of it. As an administrative division, it is incorporated separately as the town of oblast significance of Uvarovo—an administrative unit with the status equal to that of the districts. As a municipal division, the town of oblast significance of Uvarovo is incorporated as Uvarovo Urban Okrug.

== Notable people ==
- Andrei Streltsov (born 1984), footballer
