= Mordovsky District =

Mordovsky District Мордовский район
- District
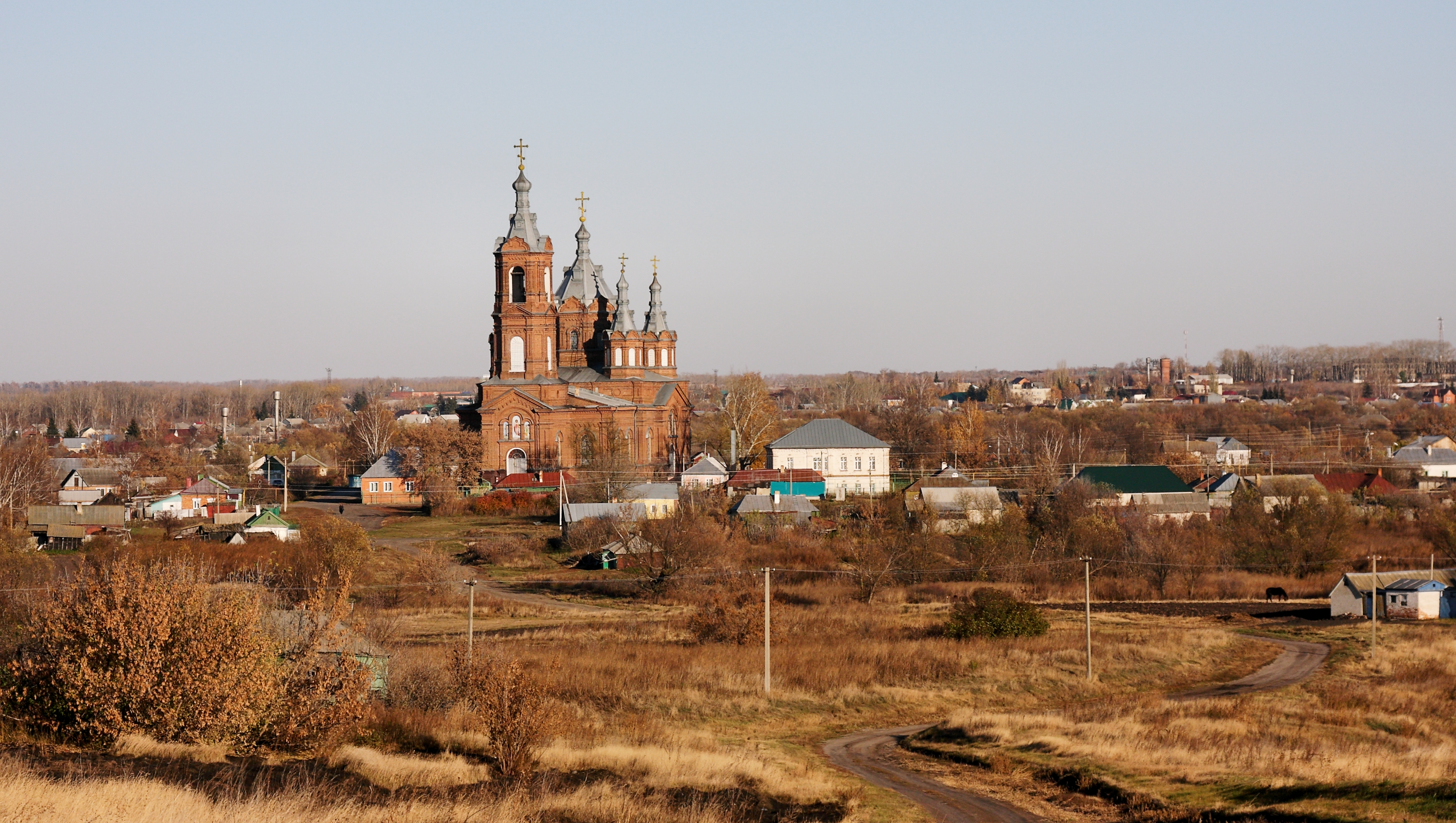

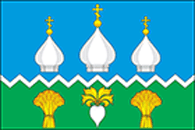
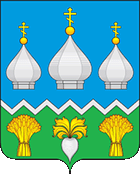
- Flag Coat of arms
- Location of Mordovsky District in Tambov Oblast
- Coordinates: 52°05′15″N 40°46′47″E
- Country: Russia
- Federal subject: Tambov Oblast
- Established: 1928
- Administrative center: Mordovo

Area
  - Total: 1,455 km^{2} (562 sq mi)

Population (2010 Census)
  - Total: 19,375
  - Density: 13.32/km^{2} (34.49/sq mi)
  - Urban: 44.2%
  - Rural: 55.8%

Administrative structure
  - Administrative divisions: 2 Settlement councils, 5 Selsoviets
  - Inhabited localities: 2 urban-type settlements, 78 rural localities

Municipal structure
  - Municipally incorporated as: Mordovsky Municipal District
  - Municipal divisions: 2 urban settlements, 5 rural settlements
- Time zone: UTC+3 (MSK)
- OKTMO ID: 68614000
- Website: http://r42.tambov.gov.ru/

Mordovsky District (Russian: Мордо́вский райо́н) is an administrative and municipal district (raion), one of the twenty-three in Tambov Oblast, Russia. It is located in the southwest of the oblast. The district borders with Petrovsky District in the north, Tokaryovsky District in the east, and Dobrinsky District of Lipetsk Oblast in the south and west. The area of the district is 1,455 square kilometers (562 sq mi). Its administrative center is the urban locality (a work settlement) of Mordovo. Population: 19,375 (2010 Census); 23,671 (2002 Census); 28,522 (1989 Soviet census). The population of Mordovo accounts for 33.7% of the district's total population.
