= Morshansk =

Town in Tambov Oblast, Russia

Morshansk Моршанск
- Town
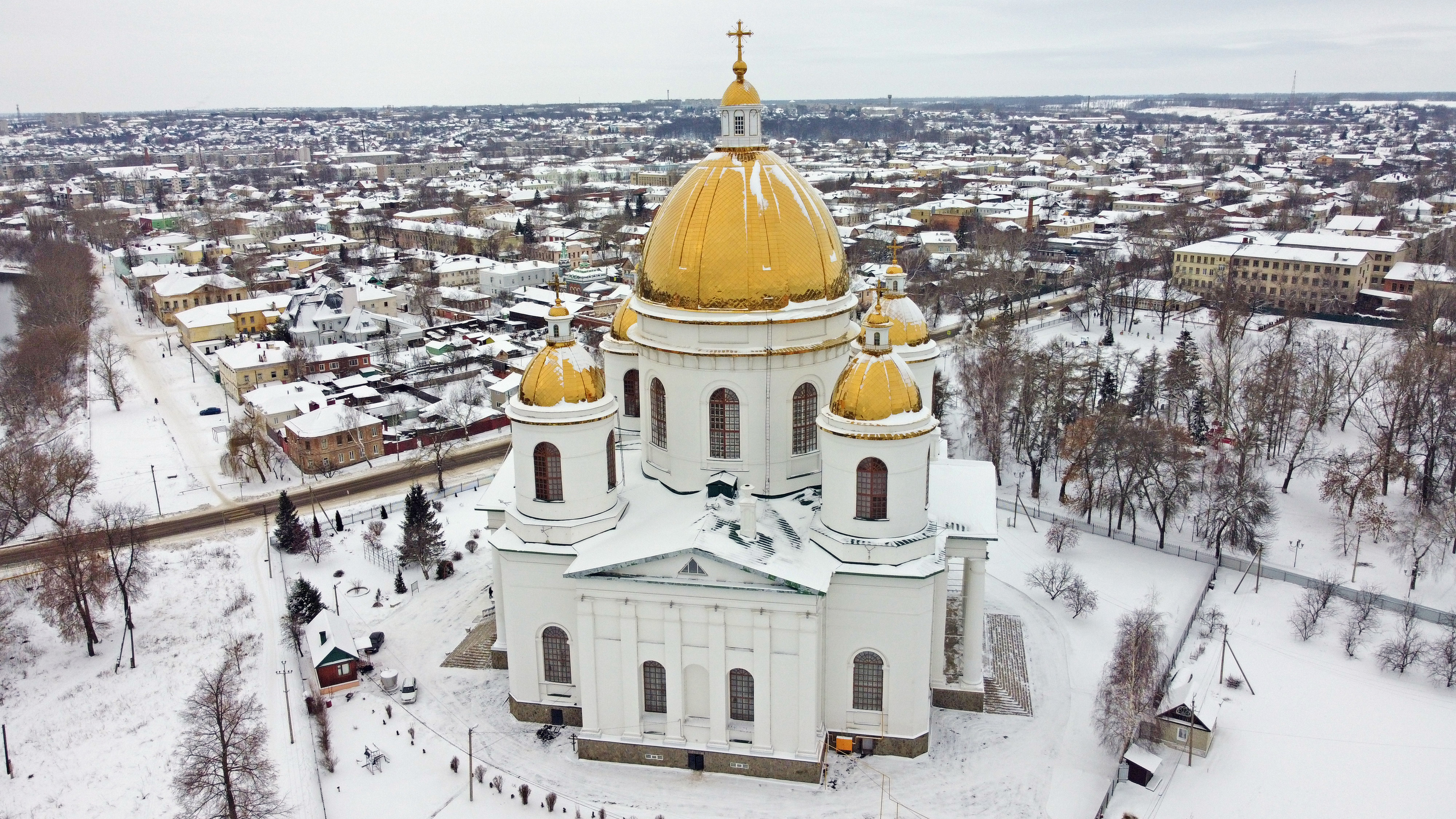

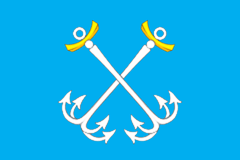
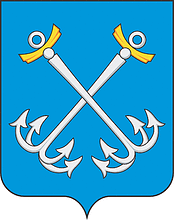
- Flag Coat of arms
- Interactive map of Morshansk
- Location of Morshansk Morshansk (Tambov Oblast)
- Coordinates: 53°27′N 41°49′E
- Country: Russia
- Federal subject: Tambov Oblast
- First mentioned: 16th century
- Town status since: 1779
- Elevation: 110 m (360 ft)

Population (2010 Census)
  - Total: 41,556
  - Estimate (2025): 38,049 (−8.4%)

Administrative status
  - Subordinated to: town of oblast significance of Morshansk
  - Capital of: Morshansky District, town of oblast significance of Morshansk

Municipal status
  - Urban okrug: Morshansk Urban Okrug
  - Capital of: Morshansk Urban Okrug, Morshansky Municipal District
- Time zone: UTC+3 (MSK)
- Postal code: 393950
- OKTMO ID: 68720000001
- Website: promorshansk.ru

Morshansk (Russian: Морша́нск) is a town in Tambov Oblast, Russia, located on the Tsna River (Oka's basin) 93 kilometers (58 mi) north of Tambov. Population: 41,556 (2010 census); 44,486 (2002 census); 50,055 (1989 Soviet census); 44,000 (1970).

== History ==
The exact origins of Morshansk are unknown; however, documents mention a populated place in this location since at least the 16th century. Formerly a village called Morsha (Морша), it was granted town status in 1779 by Catherine the Great because of its growth in relation to the fact that it was a major bread trading center on the Tsna River.

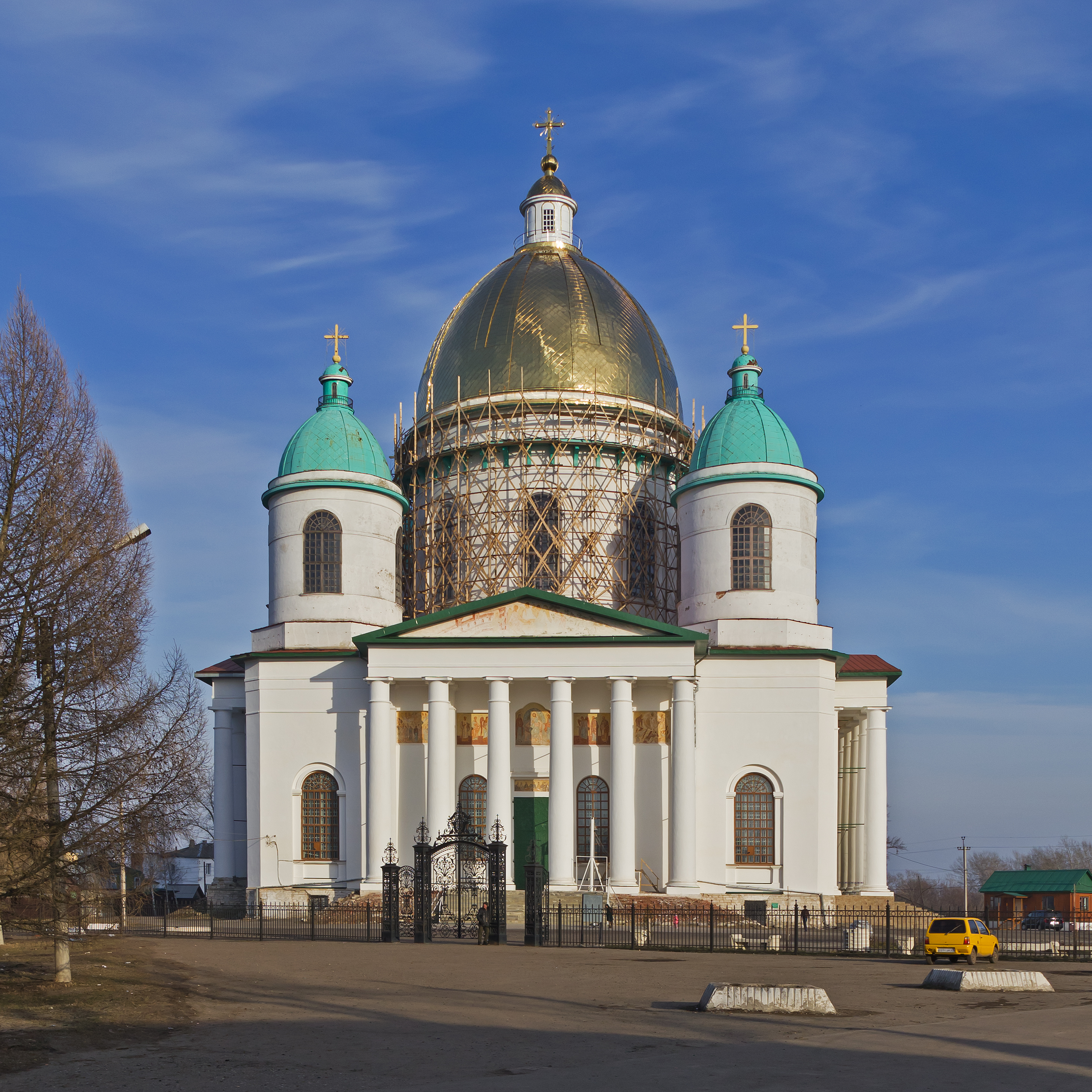
Trinity Cathedral in Morshansk

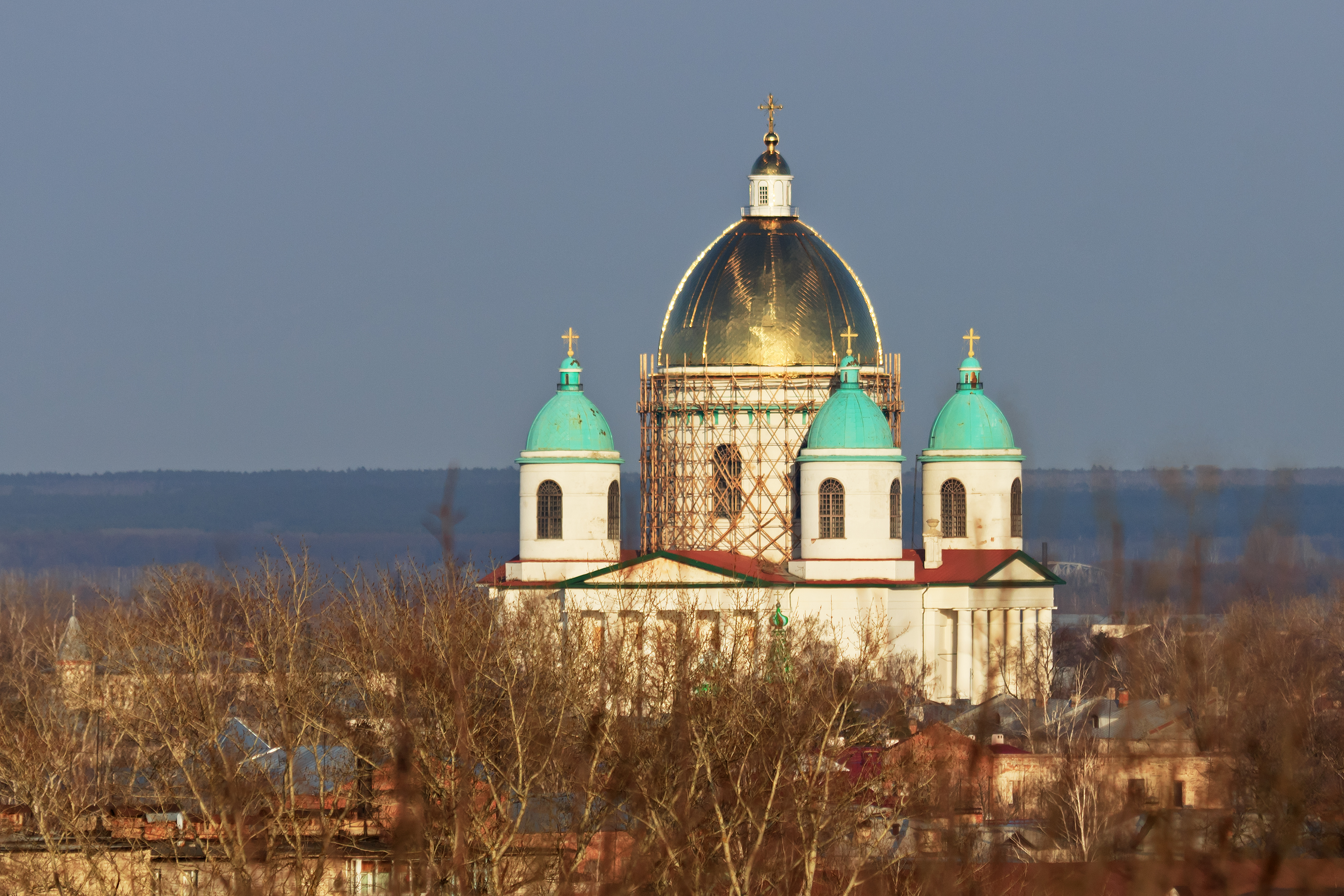
Trinity Cathedral (remote view)

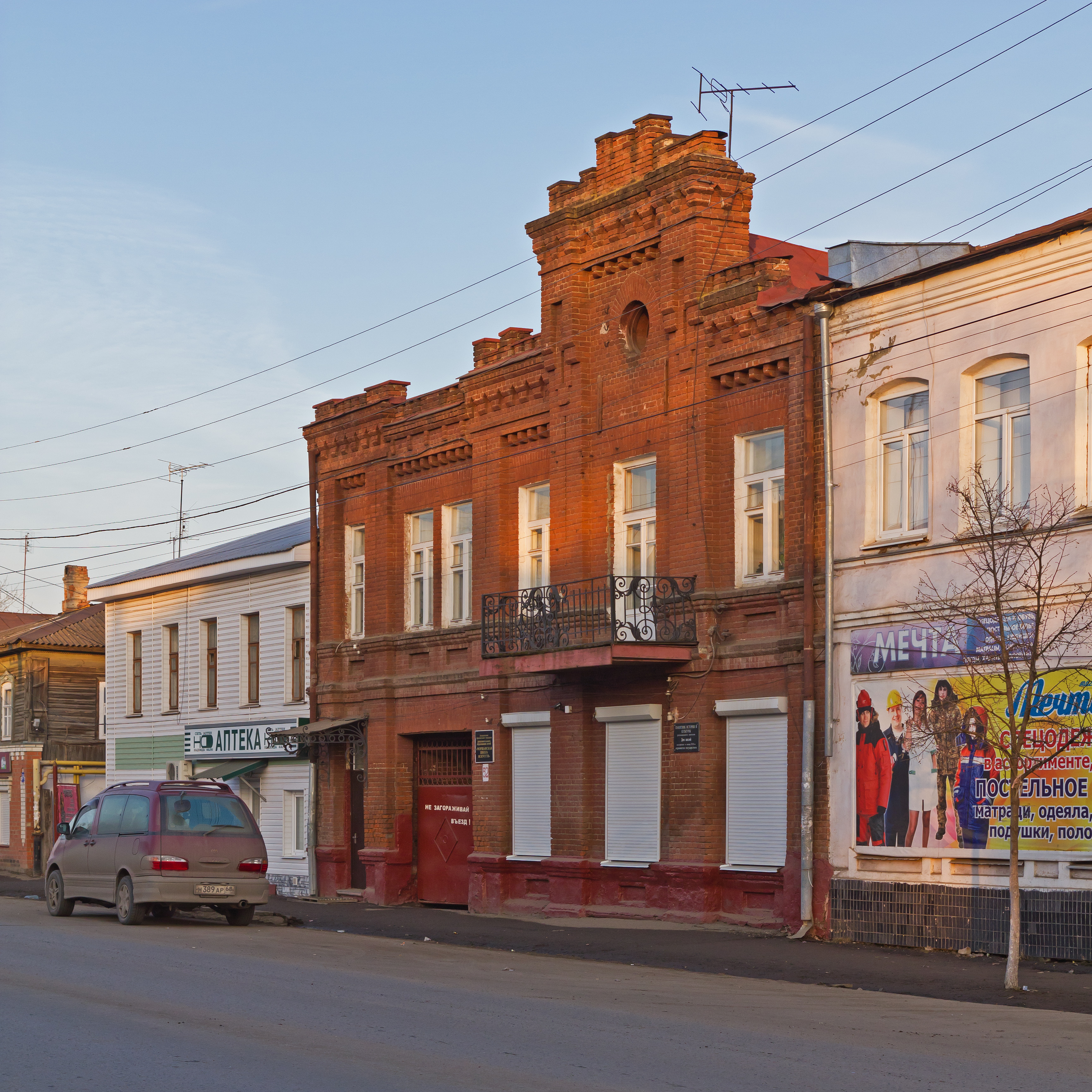
A listed house

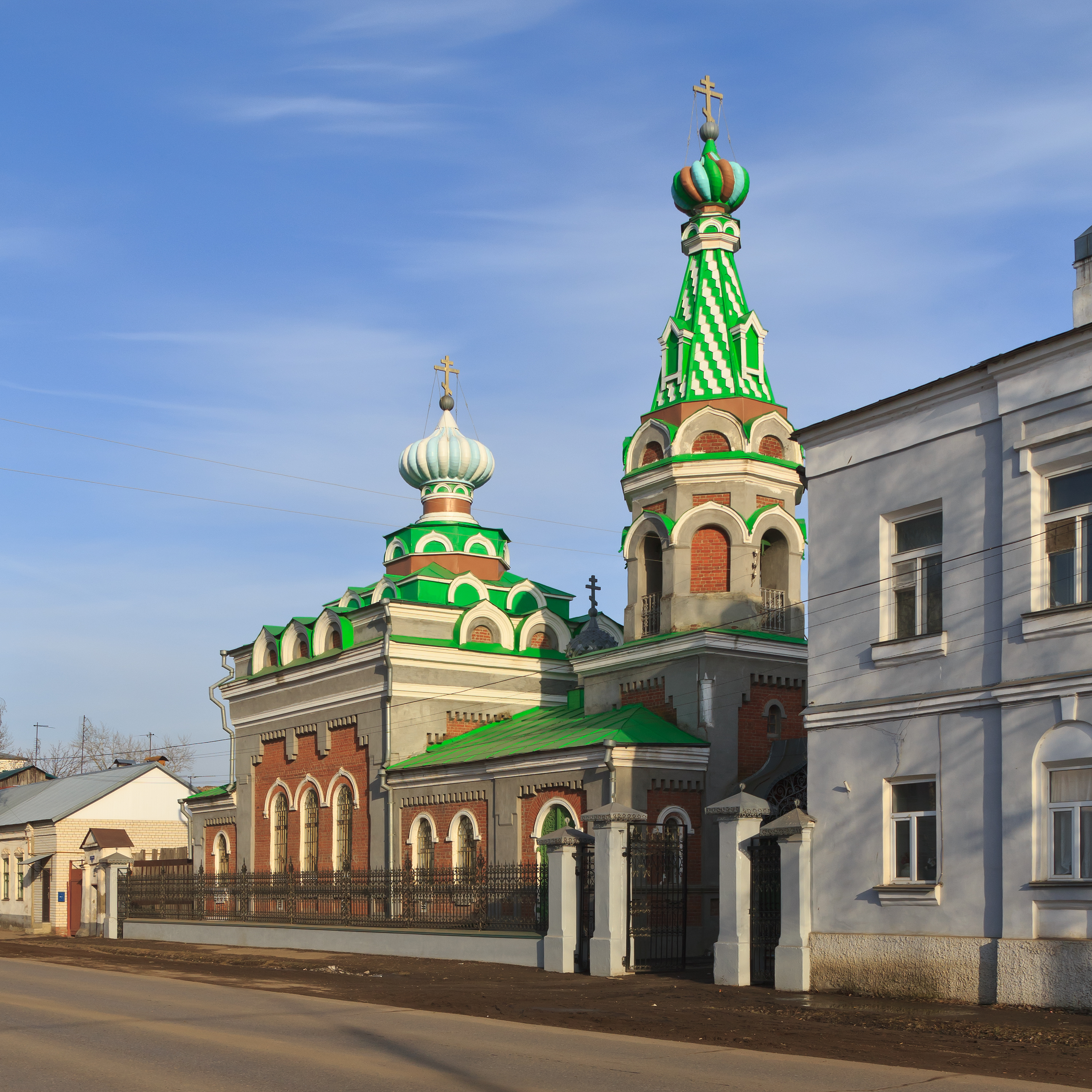
Assumption Church (Old Believers)

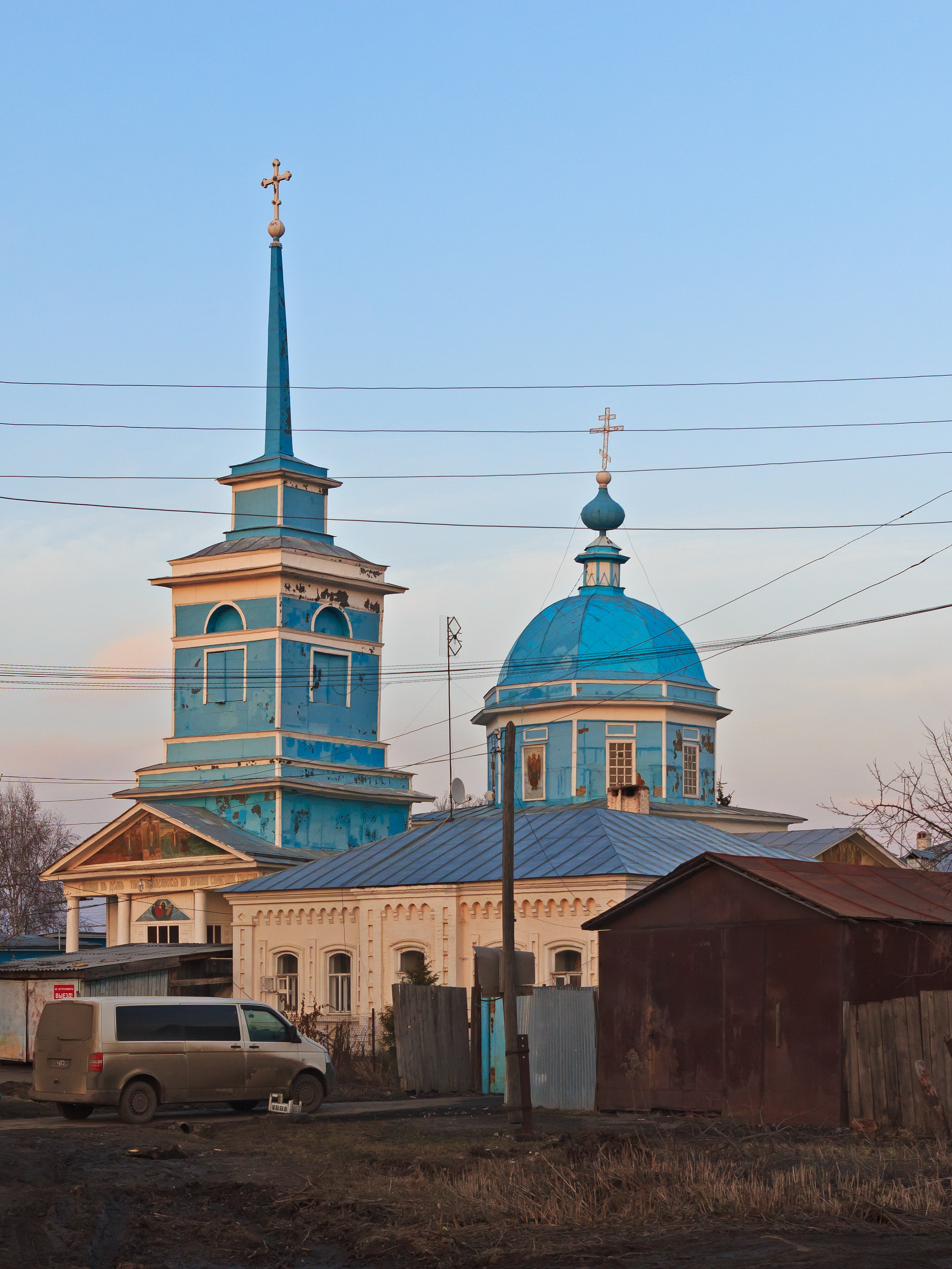
Church of St. Nicholas

== Administrative and municipal status ==
Within the framework of administrative divisions, Morshansk serves as the administrative center of Morshansky District, even though it is not a part of it. As an administrative division, it is incorporated separately as the town of oblast significance of Morshansk—an administrative unit with the status equal to that of the districts. As a municipal division, the town of oblast significance of Morshansk is incorporated as Morshansk Urban Okrug.

== Notable people from Morshansk ==
- Nikolai Valentinov (1879–1964) Russian Marxist
- Sophia Bardina (1853-1883), revolutionary
