= Znamensky District, Tambov Oblast =

Znamensky District Знаменский район (Russian)
- District
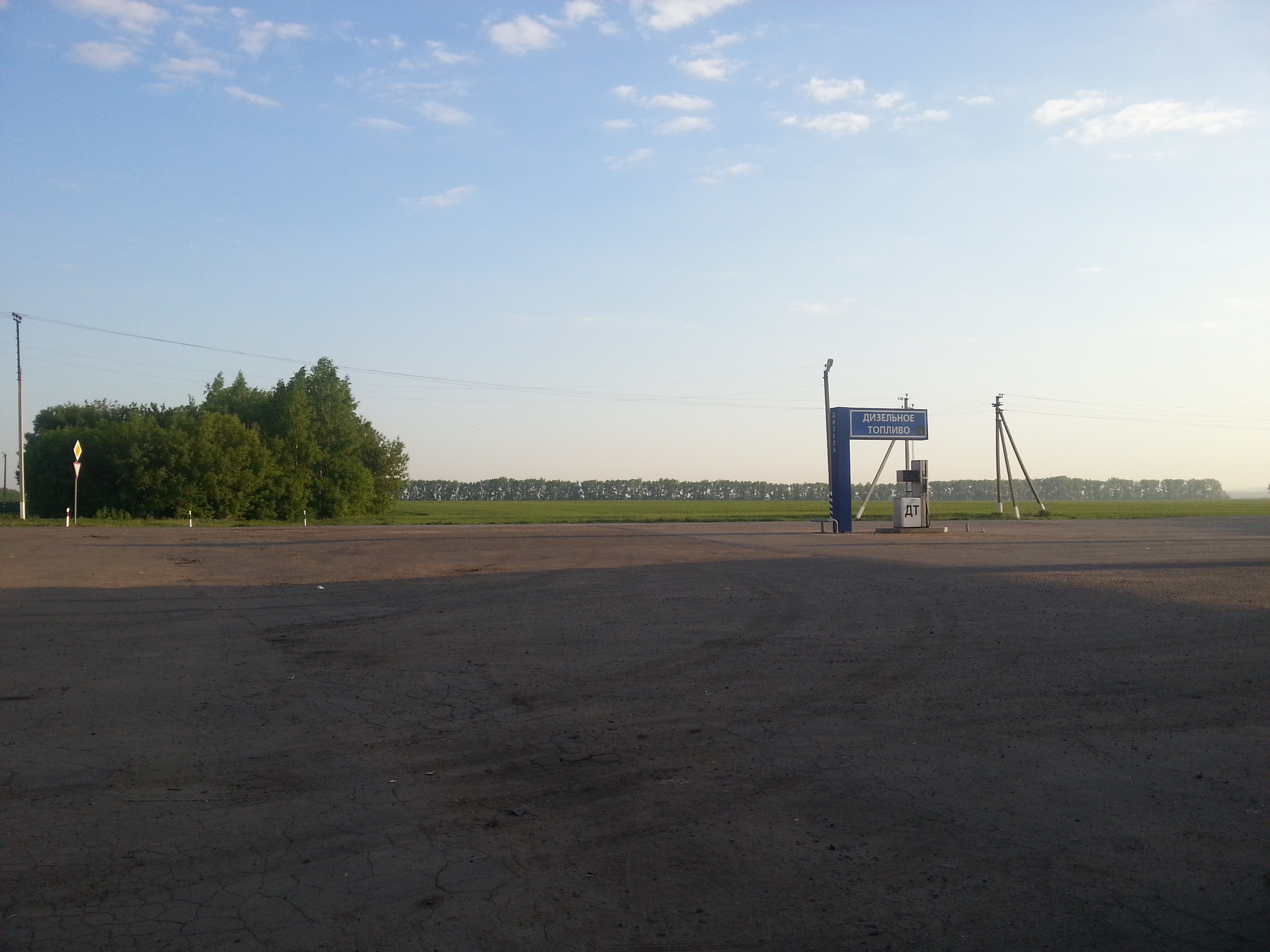
- Flatland in Znamensky District

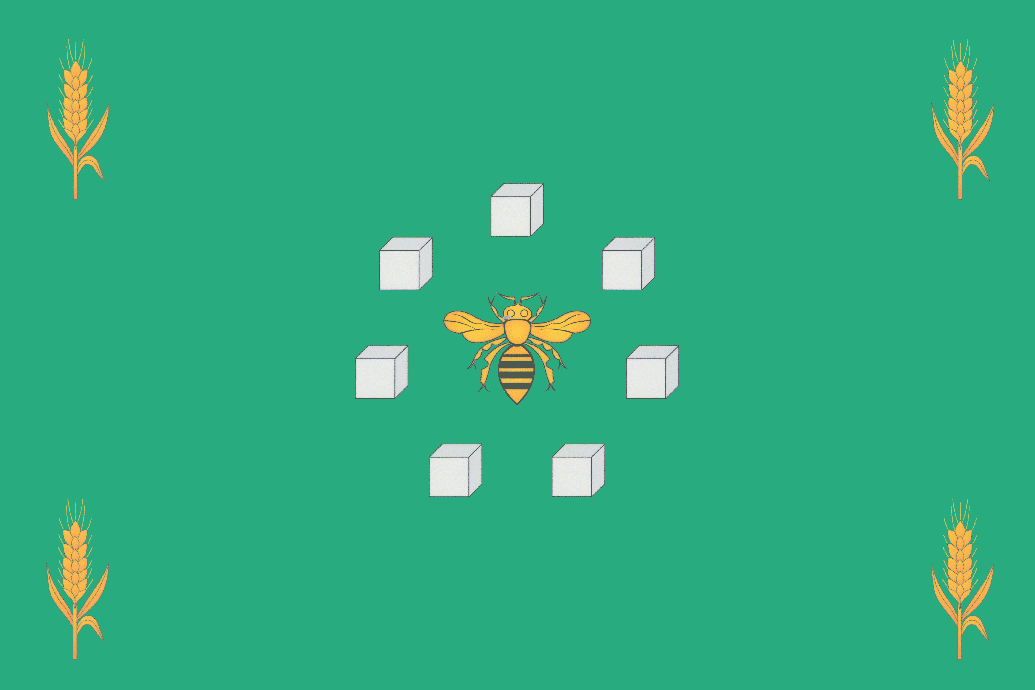
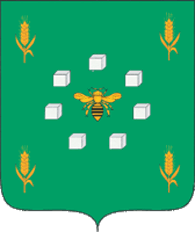
- Flag Coat of arms
- Location of Znamensky District in Tambov Oblast
- Coordinates: 52°26′N 41°30′E
- Country: Russia
- Federal subject: Tambov Oblast
- Established: 1941
- Administrative center: Znamenka

Area
  - Total: 1,102 km^{2} (425 sq mi)

Population (2010 Census)
  - Total: 18,405
  - Density: 16.70/km^{2} (43.26/sq mi)
  - Urban: 33.5%
  - Rural: 66.5%

Administrative structure
  - Administrative divisions: 1 Settlement councils, 7 Selsoviets
  - Inhabited localities: 1 urban-type settlements, 39 rural localities

Municipal structure
  - Municipally incorporated as: Znamensky Municipal District
  - Municipal divisions: 1 urban settlements, 7 rural settlements
- Time zone: UTC+3 (MSK)
- OKTMO ID: 68606000
- Website: http://r52.tambov.gov.ru

Znamensky District (Russian: Знаменский райо́н) is an administrative and municipal district (raion), one of the twenty-three in Tambov Oblast, Russia. It is located in the southwestern central part of the oblast. The district borders with Tambovsky District in the north, Sampursky District in the east, Tokaryovsky District in the south, and with Morshansky District in the west. The area of the district is 1,102 square kilometers (425 sq mi). Its administrative center is the urban locality (a work settlement) of Znamenka. Population: 18,405 (2010 Census); 20,590 (2002 census); 23,045 (1989 Soviet census). The population of Znamenka accounts for 33.5% of the district's total population.

== Notable residents ==
- Natalia Pushkina (1812–1863), wife of the poet Alexander Pushkin, born in the village of Karian
