= Olshanka =

Olshanka (Russian: Ольшанка) is the name of several rural localities in Russia.

== Modern localities ==
- Olshanka, Belgorod Oblast, a selo in Chernyansky District of Belgorod Oblast
- Olshanka, Lutensky Rural Administrative Okrug, Kletnyansky District, Bryansk Oblast, a village in Lutensky Rural Administrative Okrug of Kletnyansky District in Bryansk Oblast; 53°26′N 33°9′E
- Olshanka, Muzhinovsky Rural Administrative Okrug, Kletnyansky District, Bryansk Oblast, a village in Muzhinovsky Rural Administrative Okrug of Kletnyansky District in Bryansk Oblast; 53°15′N 33°18′E
- Olshanka, Chelyabinsk Oblast, a settlement in Chernoborsky Selsoviet of Chesmensky District in Chelyabinsk Oblast
- Olshanka, Kaliningrad Oblast, a settlement in Kovrovsky Rural Okrug of Zelenogradsky District in Kaliningrad Oblast
- Olshanka, Bolshesoldatsky District, Kursk Oblast, a settlement in Volokonsky Selsoviet of Bolshesoldatsky District in Kursk Oblast
- Olshanka, Lgovsky District, Kursk Oblast, a selo in Olshansky Selsoviet of Lgovsky District in Kursk Oblast
- Olshanka, Lipetsk Oblast, a village in Khvorostyansky Selsoviet of Dobrinsky District in Lipetsk Oblast; 52°19′N 40°9′E
- Olshanka, Republic of Mordovia, a settlement in Nadezhdinsky Selsoviet of Yelnikovsky District in the Republic of Mordovia; 54°37′N 44°10′E
- Olshanka, Novgorod Oblast, a village in Marevskoye Settlement of Maryovsky District in Novgorod Oblast
- Olshanka, Oryol Oblast, a village in Nizhne-Zalegoshchensky Selsoviet of Zalegoshchensky District in Oryol Oblast
- Olshanka, Bashmakovsky District, Penza Oblast, a selo in Sosnovsky Selsoviet of Bashmakovsky District in Penza Oblast
- Olshanka, Belinsky District, Penza Oblast, a selo in Kozlovsky Selsoviet of Belinsky District in Penza Oblast
- Olshanka, Penzensky District, Penza Oblast, a village in Voskresenovsky Selsoviet of Penzensky District in Penza Oblast
- Olshanka, Rostov Oblast, a selo in Olshanskoye Rural Settlement of Tselinsky District in Rostov Oblast
- Olshanka, Ryazan Oblast, a selo in Olshansky Rural Okrug of Miloslavsky District in Ryazan Oblast
- Olshanka, Sakhalin Oblast, a selo in Uglegorsky District of Sakhalin Oblast
- Olshanka, Arkadaksky District, Saratov Oblast, a selo in Arkadaksky District of Saratov Oblast
- Olshanka, Samoylovsky District, Saratov Oblast, a selo in Samoylovsky District of Saratov Oblast
- Olshanka, Smolensk Oblast, a village in Pechatnikovskoye Rural Settlement of Kholm-Zhirkovsky District in Smolensk Oblast
- Olshanka, Chupovsky Selsoviet, Gavrilovsky District, Tambov Oblast, a village in Chupovsky Selsoviet of Gavrilovsky District in Tambov Oblast
- Olshanka, Kirsanovsky District, Tambov Oblast, a selo in Sokolovsky Selsoviet of Kirsanovsky District in Tambov Oblast
- Olshanka, Muchkapsky District, Tambov Oblast, a village in Troitsky Selsoviet of Muchkapsky District in Tambov Oblast
- Olshanka, Uvarovsky District, Tambov Oblast, a selo in Verkhneshibryaysky Selsoviet of Uvarovsky District in Tambov Oblast
- Olshanka, Znamensky District, Tambov Oblast, a selo in Kuzminsky Selsoviet of Znamensky District in Tambov Oblast
- Olshanka, Volgograd Oblast, a khutor in Olshansky Selsoviet of Uryupinsky District in Volgograd Oblast

== Abolished localities ==
- Olshanka, Dmitriyevsky Selsoviet, Gavrilovsky District, Tambov Oblast, a village in Dmitriyevsky Selsoviet of Gavrilovsky District in Tambov Oblast; abolished in November 2011

== Alternative names ==
- Olshanka, alternative name of 1-ya Olshanka, a village in Dubovetsky Selsoviet of Dolgorukovsky District in Lipetsk Oblast; 52°18′N 38°12′E
- Olshanka, alternative name of Olshanka Vtoraya, a village in Kurgano-Golovinsky Selsoviet of Terbunsky District in Lipetsk Oblast; 52°14′N 38°16′E

== See also ==
- Olszanka (disambiguation)
