= Belinsky =

Belinsky (masculine), Belinskaya (feminine), or Belinskoye (neuter) may refer to:

- Belinsky (surname) (fem. Belinskaya)
  - Vissarion Belinsky (1811–1848), Russian literary critic
- Belinsky District, a district of Penza Oblast, Russia
- Belinsky Urban Settlement, a municipal formation which the town of district significance of Belinsky in Belinsky District of Penza Oblast, Russia is incorporated as
- Belinsky (inhabited locality) (Belinskaya, Belinskoye), several inhabited localities in Russia
- Belinsky (film), a 1954 film directed by Grigori Kozintsev
- 3747 Belinskij, an asteroid discovered by Lyudmila Chernykh in 1975
