= Gavrilovsky District =

Gavrilovsky District Гавриловский район (Russian)
- District
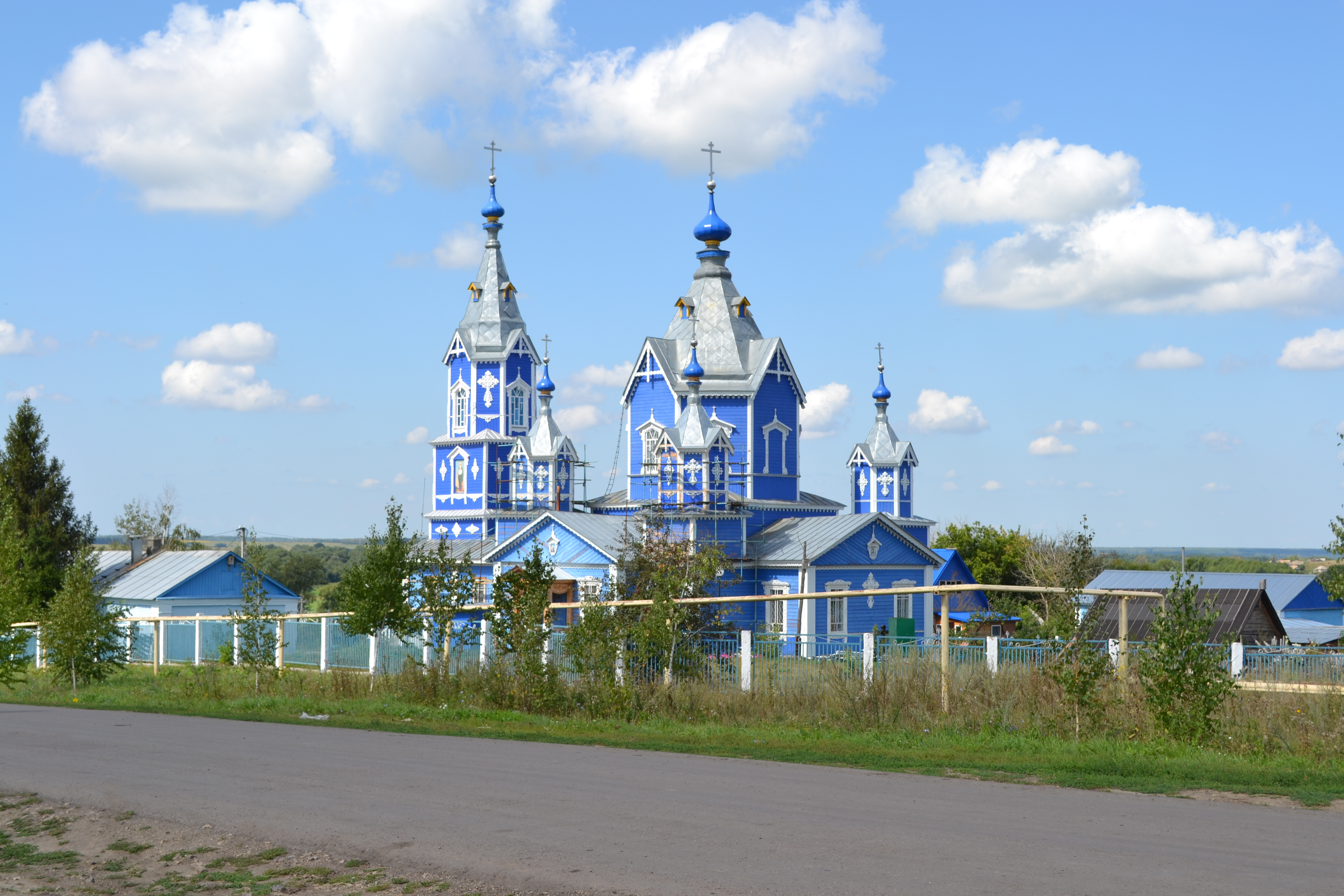
- Wooden Church of the Theotokos of the Sign in Osino-Gay

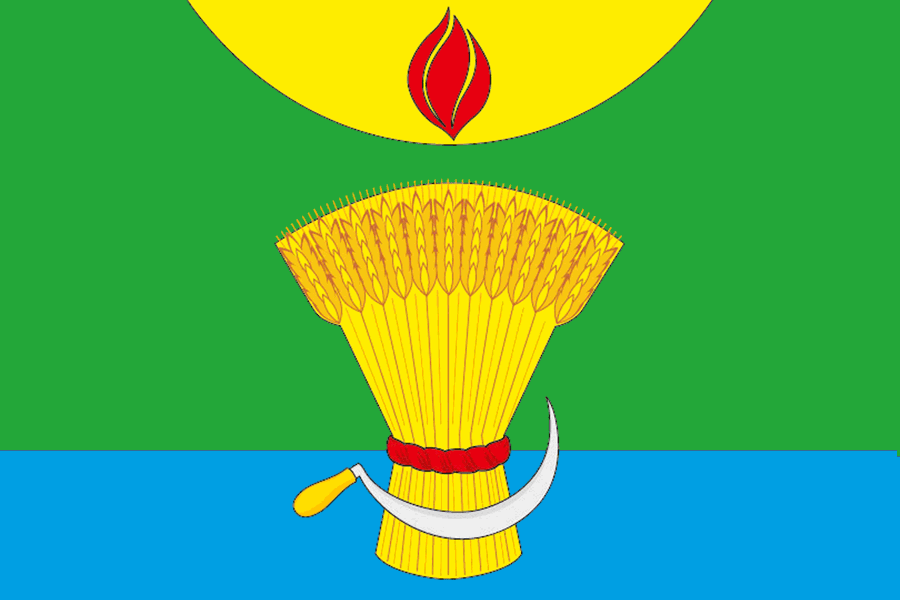
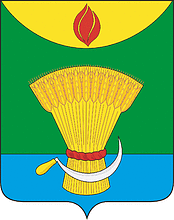
- Flag Coat of arms
- Location of Gavrilovsky District in Tambov Oblast
- Coordinates: 52°52′N 42°47′E
- Country: Russia
- Federal subject: Tambov Oblast
- Established: 1935
- Administrative center: Gavrilovka 2-ya

Area
  - Total: 998 km^{2} (385 sq mi)

Population (2010 Census)
  - Total: 12,032
  - Density: 12.1/km^{2} (31.2/sq mi)
  - Urban: 0%
  - Rural: 100%

Administrative structure
  - Administrative divisions: 6 Selsoviets
  - Inhabited localities: 49 rural localities

Municipal structure
  - Municipally incorporated as: Gavrilovsky Municipal District
  - Municipal divisions: 0 urban settlements, 6 rural settlements
- Time zone: UTC+3 (MSK)
- OKTMO ID: 68603000
- Website: http://r51.tambov.gov.ru

Gavrilovsky District (Russian: Гаври́ловский райо́н) is an administrative and municipal district (raion), one of the twenty-three in Tambov Oblast, Russia. It is located in the east of the oblast. The district borders with Pichayevsky District in the north, Belinsky District of Penza Oblast in the east, Kirsanovsky District in the south, and with Bondarsky District in the west. The area of the district is 998 square kilometers (385 sq mi). Its administrative center is the rural locality (a selo) of Gavrilovka 2-ya. Population: 12,032 (2010 Census); 14,182 (2002 census); 15,528 (1989 Soviet census). The population of Gavrilovka 2-ya accounts for 22.2% of the district's total population.

== Geography ==
Gavrilovsky District is on the east-central side of Tambov Oblast, bordering on Penza Oblast. The district is about 70 km east of the city of Tambov, 50 km southeast of Morshansk, and 15 km north of Kirsanov. The Vorona River runs through the towards the south in the eastern sector of the district. The river ultimately empties into the Khopyor River and then the Don River. Gavrilovsky District is on the eastern edge of the Oka–Don Lowland, leading east into the Volga Uplands. The terrain is flat with draws and ravines, with steppe and forest-steppe vegetation. The black soil of the district supports agriculture. The federal highway R-209 (Penza–Tambov) runs through the district.

The district measures about 40 km north–south and west–east. The administrative center of the district is the city of Gavrilovka 2-ya.

As of January, 2016, the three largest towns are Gavrilovka 2-ya (pop. 3,396), Peresypkinsky (pop. 2,313), and Kozmodemyanovsky (pop. 1,336).

=== Climate ===
Average temperature in nearby Tambov in January is −10 °C (14 °F), and average July temperature is 20 °C (68 °F). Annual precipitation is 550 millimeters (22 in), and falls mostly in April through October. The climate is Humid continental climate, cool summer, (Dfb). This climate is characterized by large swings in temperature, both diurnally and seasonally, with mild summers and cold, snowy winters.

== Economy ==
Employment in the district is focused on food processing and agriculture.

=== Agriculture ===
Gavrilovsky is an agricultural district, with farm revenues split about 30% crops and 70% livestock (including dairy). The most important grains are sunflower, barley, and wheat. Approximately 49,319 hectares (50%) of the total area of the district is in cultivation for crops. In 2014, the top seven crops by area were:

Crop	Cultivated area (ha)	% of cultivated area
sunflower grain	15607	32
summer barley	9333	19
winter wheat	8790	18
spring wheat	7076	14
sugar beet (factory)	3951	8
peas	1220	2
corn for grain	982	2

== Notable residents ==
- Zoya Kosmodemyanskaya (1923–1941), Soviet partisan, Hero of the Soviet Union, from the village of Osino-Gay
- Aleksandr Kosmodemyansky (1925–1945), first lieutenant, Hero of the Soviet Union, from the village of Osino-Gay
