= Samoylovka =

Samoylovka (Russian: Самойловка) is the name of several inhabited localities in Russia.

Urban localities

- Samoylovka, Saratov Oblast, a work settlement in Samoylovsky District of Saratov Oblast

Rural localities

- Samoylovka, Republic of Bashkortostan, a village in Pervomaysky Selsoviet of Meleuzovsky District of the Republic of Bashkortostan
- Samoylovka, Belgorod Oblast, a selo in Korochansky District of Belgorod Oblast
- Samoylovka, Krasnoyarsk Krai, a selo in Samoylovsky Selsoviet of Abansky District of Krasnoyarsk Krai
- Samoylovka, Nizhny Novgorod Oblast, a village under the administrative jurisdiction of the work settlement of Tumbotino in Pavlovsky District of Nizhny Novgorod Oblast
