= Olszanka =

Olszanka may refer to:

- Olszanka, Lesser Poland Voivodeship (south Poland)
- Olszanka, Biłgoraj County in Lublin Voivodeship (east Poland)
- Olszanka, Gmina Kraśniczyn in Lublin Voivodeship (east Poland)
- Olszanka, Gmina Łopiennik Górny in Lublin Voivodeship (east Poland)
- Olszanka, Lublin County in Lublin Voivodeship (east Poland)
- Olszanka, Łosice County in Masovian Voivodeship (east-central Poland)
- Olszanka, Wyszków County in Masovian Voivodeship (east-central Poland)
- Olszanka, Żyrardów County in Masovian Voivodeship (east-central Poland)
- Olszanka, Opole Voivodeship (south-west Poland)
- Olszanka, Augustów County in Podlaskie Voivodeship (north-east Poland)
- Olszanka, Białystok County in Podlaskie Voivodeship (north-east Poland)
- Olszanka, Sejny County in Podlaskie Voivodeship (north-east Poland)
- Olszanka, Sokółka County in Podlaskie Voivodeship (north-east Poland)
- Olszanka, Gmina Filipów in Podlaskie Voivodeship (north-east Poland)
- Olszanka, Gmina Przerośl in Podlaskie Voivodeship (north-east Poland)
- Olszanka, Gmina Rutka-Tartak in Podlaskie Voivodeship (north-east Poland)
- Olszanka, Gmina Szypliszki in Podlaskie Voivodeship (north-east Poland)
- Olszanka, Pomeranian Voivodeship (north Poland)
- Olszanka River in north-east Poland

== See also ==
- Olshanka
