= Semyon Sakhnov =

Red army major general

Semyon Pavlovich Sakhnov
- Sakhnov, likely during World War II
- Born: 15 February 1900; Samoylovka, Balashovsky Uyezd, Saratov Governorate, Russian Empire
- Died: 8 March 1950 (aged 50); Moscow, Soviet Union
- Burial place: Vvedenskoye Cemetery
- Military career
- Allegiance: Russian SFSR; Soviet Union
- Branch: Red Army (later Soviet Army)
- Service years: 1919–1948
- Rank: Major general
- Commands: 71st Rifle Division; 56th Rifle Division; 23rd Reserve Rifle Brigade (became 23rd Reserve Rifle Division)
- Conflicts: Russian Civil War; World War II
- Awards: Order of Lenin; Order of the Red Banner

Semyon Pavlovich Sakhnov (Russian: Семён Павлович Сахнов; 15 February 1900 – 8 March 1950) was a Red Army major general who commanded the 56th Rifle Division in the early stages of the Axis invasion of the Soviet Union (Operation Barbarossa).

After fighting as an ordinary soldier in the Russian Civil War, Sakhnov graduated from an officer training school and served there during the 1920s before rising to division command in the late 1930s. He was commanding the 56th Rifle Division in Belarus when Operation Barbarossa was launched. Stationed close to the border, his unit was destroyed in the first days of the war. After more than two months behind German lines, Sakhnov reached the Soviet lines with a small group of other officers, but was expelled from the Communist Party for burying his documents when he was encircled by German units. As a result of this censure, he never held a combat command again and spent the rest of the war in command of a training unit.

== Early life and Russian Civil War ==
The son of Ukrainian peasants, Semyon Pavlovich Sakhnov was born on 15 February 1900 in Samoylovka in the Saratov Governorate of the Russian Empire (now Saratov Oblast, Russia). He graduated from the village primary school. Drafted into the Red Army on 20 July 1919 during the Russian Civil War, he was sent to serve with a cavalry battalion of the 23rd Rifle Division on the Southern Front. With the latter, Sakhnov fought as a Red Army man in the suppression of revolts in the rear of the 9th Army, and in battles against the Armed Forces of South Russia in the advance on Novocherkassk, on the Manych River, and at Yekaterinodar. He was transferred to the 99th Railroad Detachment at Balashov in February 1920 and later that year became a cadet of the 34th Machine Gun Commanders' Courses at Saratov, which became the Saratov Infantry School in May 1921. With a cadet detachment from the school, Sakhnov fought in the suppression of peasant revolts in Saratov Governorate.

== Interwar period ==
After graduating from the school in September 1922, Sakhnov remained there as a platoon commander. From October 1927 he was a class commander, and later became an assistant company commander at the school. After completing the Leningrad Armored Courses for the Improvement of Command Cadre in 1931, Sakhnov became a company commander at the tank school reorganized from the Saratov Infantry School, in April 1931.

He transferred to the 245th Rifle Regiment of the 82nd Rifle Division at Sverdlovsk, east of the Ural Mountains, in February 1932, serving with it as a battalion commander and assistant regimental commander. He became commander of the 245th before being sent to the Vystrel course for advanced training in November 1937. After completing the course in August 1938, Sakhnov, by then a colonel, was appointed commander of the 71st Rifle Division at Kemerovo in October of that year. The division was disbanded to form an officer cadet school and training courses for commanders within a few months, and in January 1940 Sakhnov became commander of the 23rd Reserve Rifle Brigade, a training unit in the district. He became a major general on 4 June of that year when the Red Army introduced general officer ranks. Appointed commander of the 201st Rifle Division at Tyumen in March 1941, Sakhnov was quickly sent to the Western Special Military District in Belarus, where he took command of the 56th Rifle Division, part of the 4th Rifle Corps of the 3rd Army, on 12 June.

== World War II ==
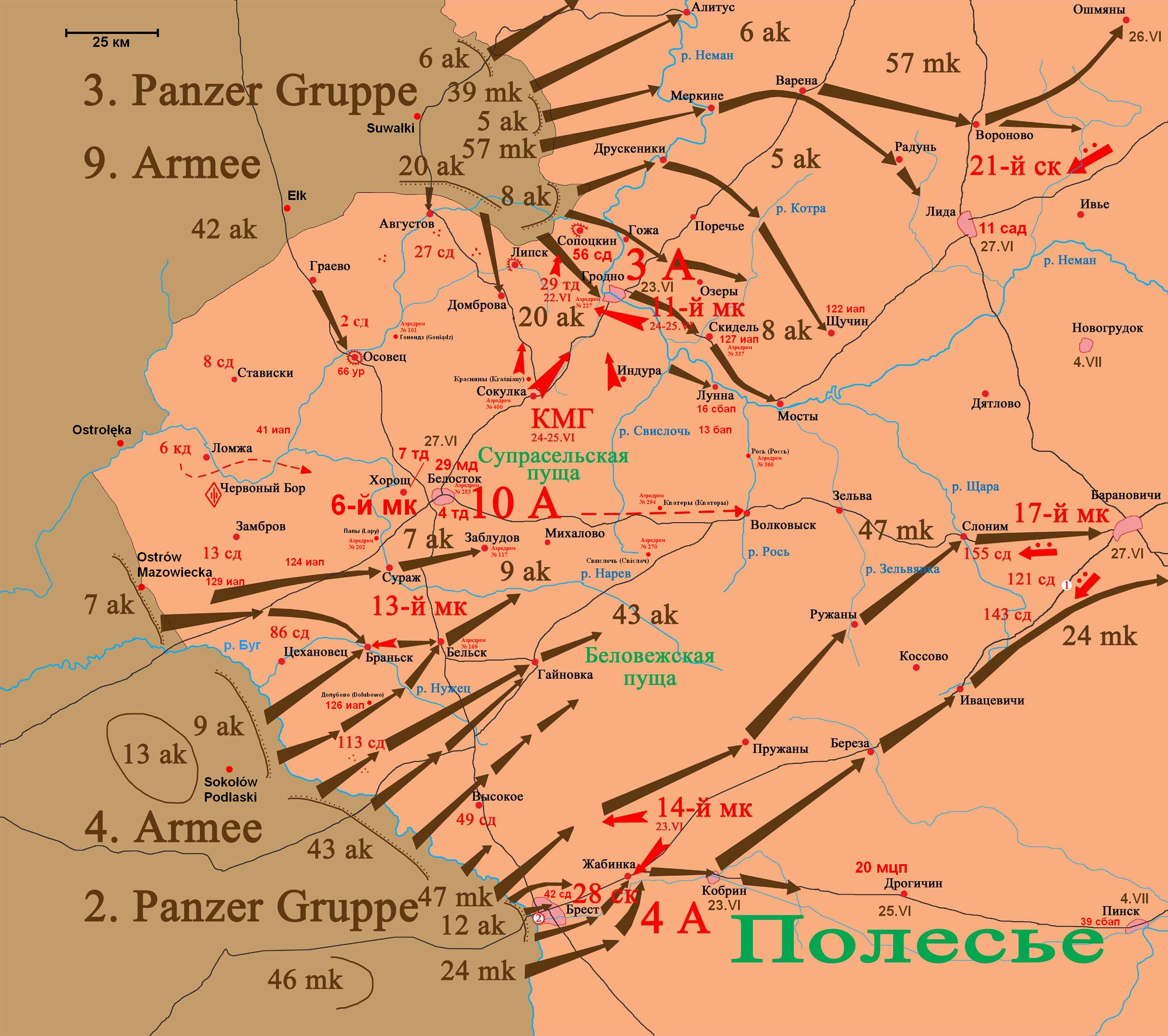
The Battle of Białystok–Minsk, 22–25 June 1941

When Operation Barbarossa began on 22 June, the 56th came under attack from three divisions of the German VIII Army Corps in what became known as the Battle of Białystok–Minsk. Spread out over an area of 50 kilometers (31 mi) in camps near Grodno in Polish territory annexed by the Soviet Union, close to the border of German-occupied Poland, the division suffered heavy losses and by 10:00 its remnants began retreating to the east and southeast, although one regiment was surrounded defending the Augustów Canal. Sakhnov's communications with his units relied on telephone lines, which were soon cut, preventing him from controlling his forces. German tanks broke through to his command post by 09:00 and he began evacuating to the rear. In the chaos, the headquarters was scattered, and by 14:00 Sakhnov, with the guard platoon, the division's political commissar and chief of artillery, and other headquarters officers, made his way eastward, deep in the German rear. To cross the Neman, the group split up and Sakhnov, with five other officers and six enlisted men, crossed at Grandichi, 8 kilometers (5.0 mi) north of Grodno on the night of 22–23 June. He proceeded to the Ozyory area on the next day, bringing his group to 25 people by collecting retreating troops.

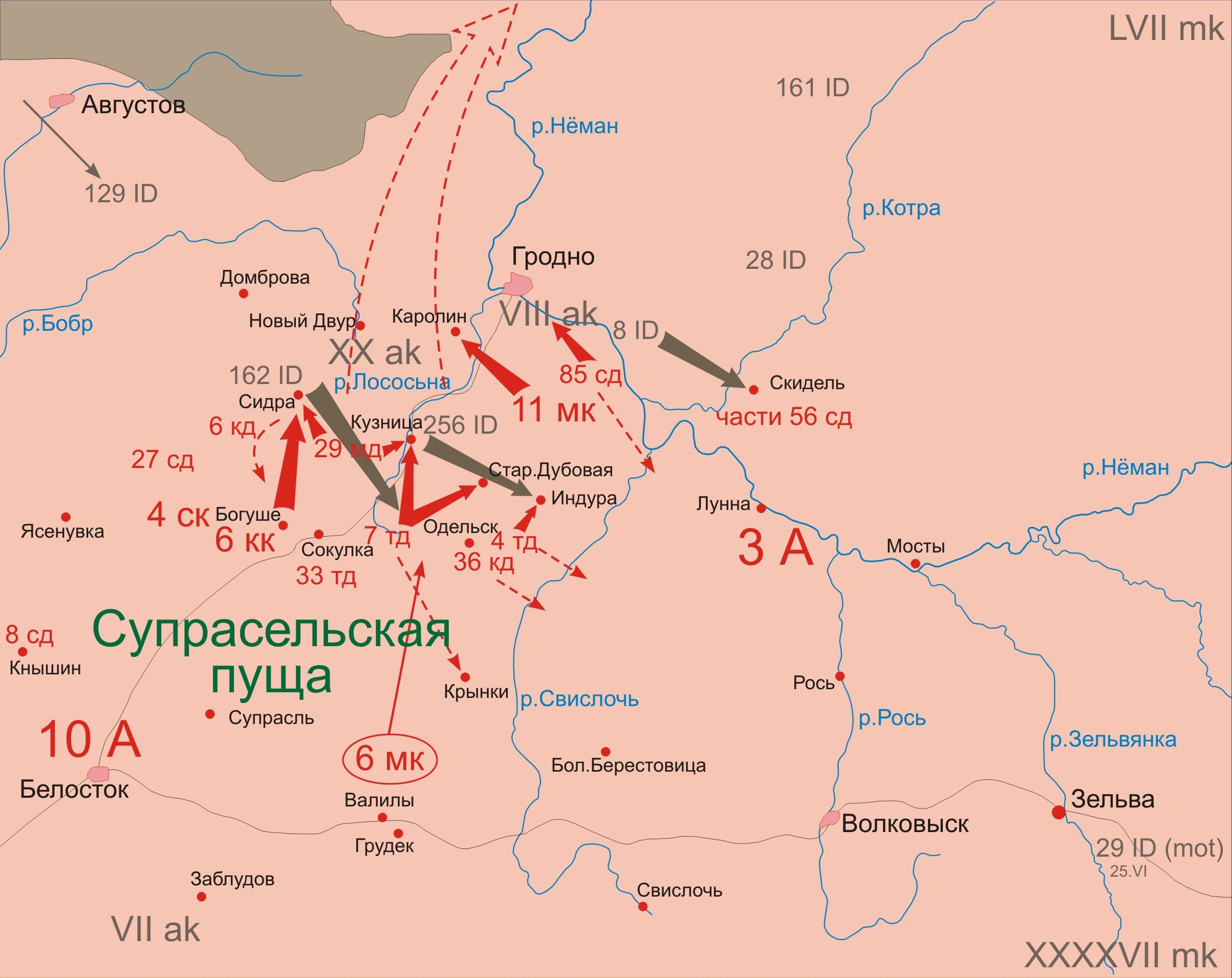
The fighting around Grodno, 24–25 June 1941

Sakhnov led his group to the Ozyory area on 24 June, having heard from another officer that Soviet troops were attempting to make a stand at Skidel. They arrived there in the afternoon, finding that the head of the operational department of the neighbouring 85th Rifle Division's staff had organized a defense from remnants of two regiments of the 56th and 85th with roughly 350 personnel. Skidel was surrounded by German tanks and infantry by the end of the day and Sakhnov, who had taken command, withdrew the troops across the Neman to the area of Most under the cover of darkness. On 25 June he and the staff officers went to Shchuchyn by staff car to retrieve rear units of the division there and shifted them and the remnants that could be collected to the area of Lida that night. Seeking the 3rd Army headquarters, supposedly at Lunno, Sakhnov and the division rear units met the commander of the 56th's 184th Rifle Regiment with 700 of his men while en route to Most and headed for Lunno on the morning of 27 June.

German defenses in the area of Most on 27 June were porous and the 184th managed to overwhelm them at Rozhanka, capturing several prisoners who were shot, according to Sakhnov's postwar recollections. Later that day they slipped through the German lines to reach the south bank of the Neman at Most, but in the fighting Sakhnov and a group of around 50 people were separated from the regiment. After this engagement, Sakhnov's group gradually split into ever smaller groups that continued to move east over the next few days. Having to detour around German-occupied locations, Sakhnov and four other officers from his unit and the 3rd Army staff slowly made their way northeast on foot. He and the other officers reached Soviet lines on 6 September north of Andreapol in the sector of the 133rd Rifle Division of the 22nd Army, unarmed and dressed in civilian clothes, without his identity papers. For burying his party card with his papers while behind German lines, he was expelled from the Communist Party ten days later, a disgrace that ensured that he could not return to the front.

After spending three months under NKVD investigation, Sakhnov was briefly assigned to the Vystrel course in October before being sent to the Siberian Military District under the direction of Lieutenant General Stepan Kalinin to work on raising new units in the district. In December he was appointed commander of the 23rd Reserve Rifle Brigade, a training unit, which was reorganized as a division with the same number in July 1944. Sakhnov spent the rest of the war in Siberia. In this capacity, he was responsible for the formation of new units and the dispatch of march battalions to provide replacements for the army.

== Postwar ==
After the end of the war, Sakhnov continued to command the division. In October 1945 he became chief of the department of combat and physical training of the staff of the Western Siberian Military District. He was dismissed from the army and became chief of the military department of the Bashkir Agricultural Institute at Ufa in June 1948. Sakhnov died in Moscow on 8 March 1950, and was buried at the Vvedenskoye Cemetery. He was survived by a son, Vyacheslav, who coached basketball at Bashkir State University.

== Awards and honors ==
Sakhnov was a recipient of the following decorations:

- Order of Lenin (21 February 1945)
- Order of the Red Banner (3 November 1944)

Both awards were made as a reward for the length of his service in the Red Army.
