= Wincenty Rapacki =

Polish actor and theatre director (1840–1924)

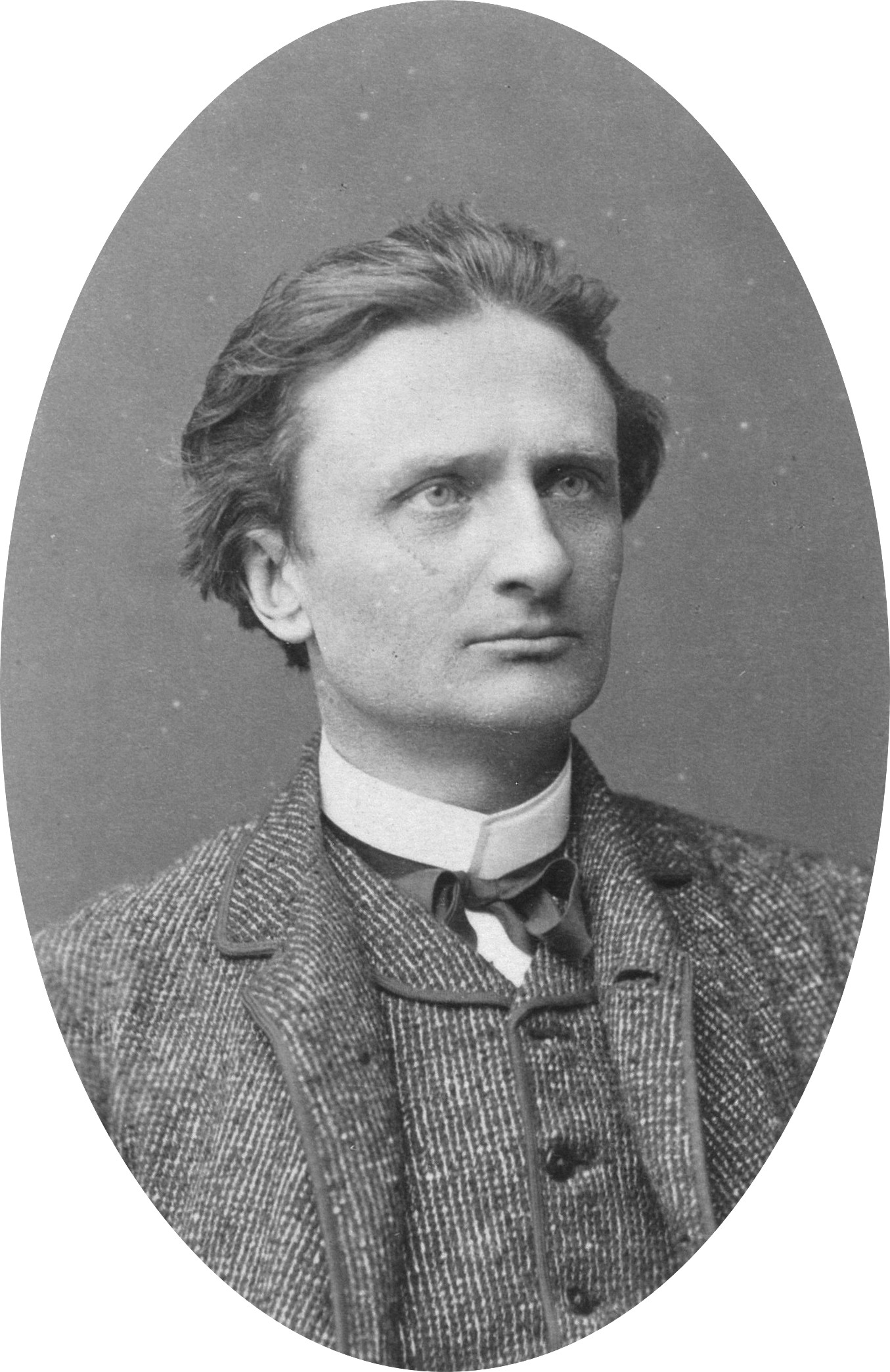
Wincenty Rapacki (1892)

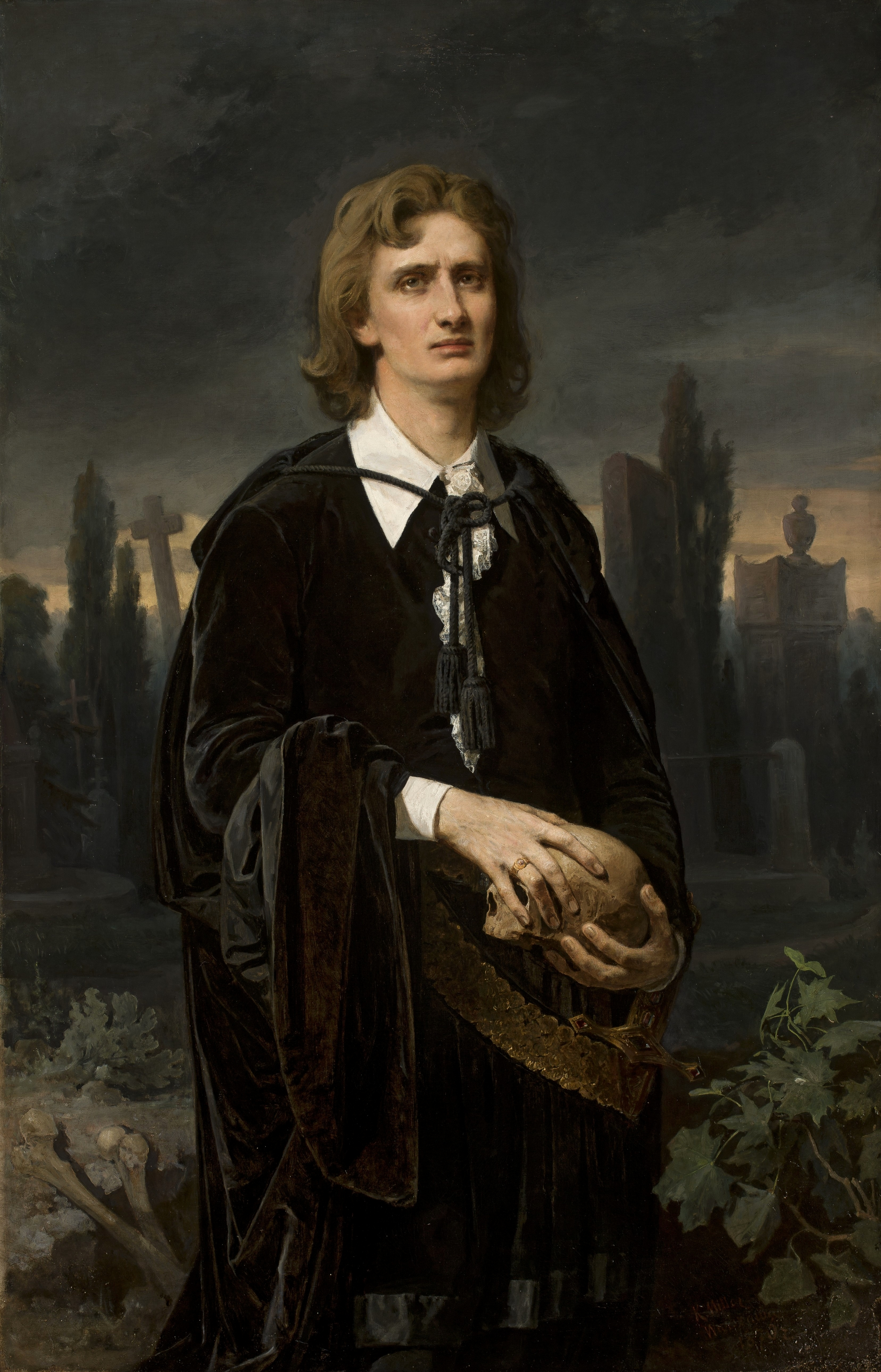
Rapacki as Hamlet, by Karol Miller (1870)

Wincenty Rapacki (22 January 1840 in Lipno – 12 January 1924 in Warsaw) was a Polish actor and theatre director.

== Biography ==
He lost his mother at an early age, and his father remarried. His step-family treated him poorly, so he spent much of his time away from home. This led to a fascination with travelling troupes, and his decision to become an actor. After leaving home, he finished his education in Płock then, when he was eighteen, enrolled at the drama school in Warsaw. Unable to find employment there, he went to Druskieniki where, in 1861, he made his début in Stare dzieje (Old History), a comedy by Józef Kraszewski.

The 1864/65 season found him in Lwów, and from 1865 to 1870 he was in Kraków. He became a voracious reader, and developed friendships among the intellectuals there, including Kraszewski, Alexander Fredro, Michał Bałucki, Karol Estreicher, and Jan Matejko, who painted his portrait. He also worked in Vienna and Paris; which exposed him to current trends in Western European theatre. In 1869, he performed 11 roles over the course of 37 days at the National Theatre, Warsaw; receiving high praise from the critics. In 1870, he found a permanent position there. During the 1875/76 season, he worked as a director. He also served as an acting teacher. After 1893, he was a lecturer in the diction and declamation class at the Warsaw Music Society.

Sometime in the early 1860s, he married the actress and singer, Józefina Hoffman. They had six children. Following her death in 1891, he married Amelia Gordon-Świejkowska (1868-1902). They had two sons. His children with Józefina included:

- Honorata, an actress; mother of the actor Jerzy Leszczyński.
- Wincenty, an actor, singer, and author of several libretti; father of the actress Halina Rapacka, a Nazi collaborator.
- Józef, a landscape painter and watercolorist.

From 1919 until his death, he performed at the Warsaw Variety Theatre. In 1921, he became the first actor to be awarded the Order of Polonia Restituta. That same year, he had a small part in Cud nad Wisłą (Miracle on the Vistula), an epic film by Richard Boleslawski.

In addition to acting, he wrote novels and plays, made translations, and adapted works for the stage; including Les Misérables, by Victor Hugo. He was a regular contributor to several magazines such as Kłosy, the Kurier Warszawski, and Tygodnik Ilustrowany. His extensive diaries were never published during his lifetime, and most were destroyed during the Warsaw Uprising. The surviving fragments were published in 1965.
