= Belinsky (inhabited locality) =

Belinsky (Russian: Белинский; masculine), Belinskaya (Белинская; feminine), or Belinskoye (Белинское; neuter) is the name of several inhabited localities in Russia.

Urban localities

- Belinsky, Penza Oblast, a town in Belinsky District of Penza Oblast

Rural localities

- Belinskoye, Kaliningrad Oblast, a settlement in Novostroyevsky Rural Okrug of Ozyorsky District in Kaliningrad Oblast
- Belinskoye, Sakhalin Oblast, a selo in Tomarinsky District of Sakhalin Oblast
