= Maly Chembar =

- Native name: Малый Чембар (Russian)

Location
- Country: Russia

Physical characteristics
- Mouth: Chembar
  - coordinates: 52.9353°N 43.4276°E
- Length: 33 km (21 mi)
- Basin size: 241 km^{2} (93 sq mi)

Basin features
- Progression: Chembar→ Vorona→ Khopyor→ Don→ Sea of Azov

The Maly Chembar (Russian: Малый Чембар) is a river of Penza Oblast, Russia. It joins the Chembar near the town Belinsky. It is 33 kilometres (21 mi) long, and has a drainage basin of 241 square kilometres (93 sq mi).
