= Tarkhany =

Writer's house museum in Russia

Coordinates: 52°59′27″N 43°39′17″E

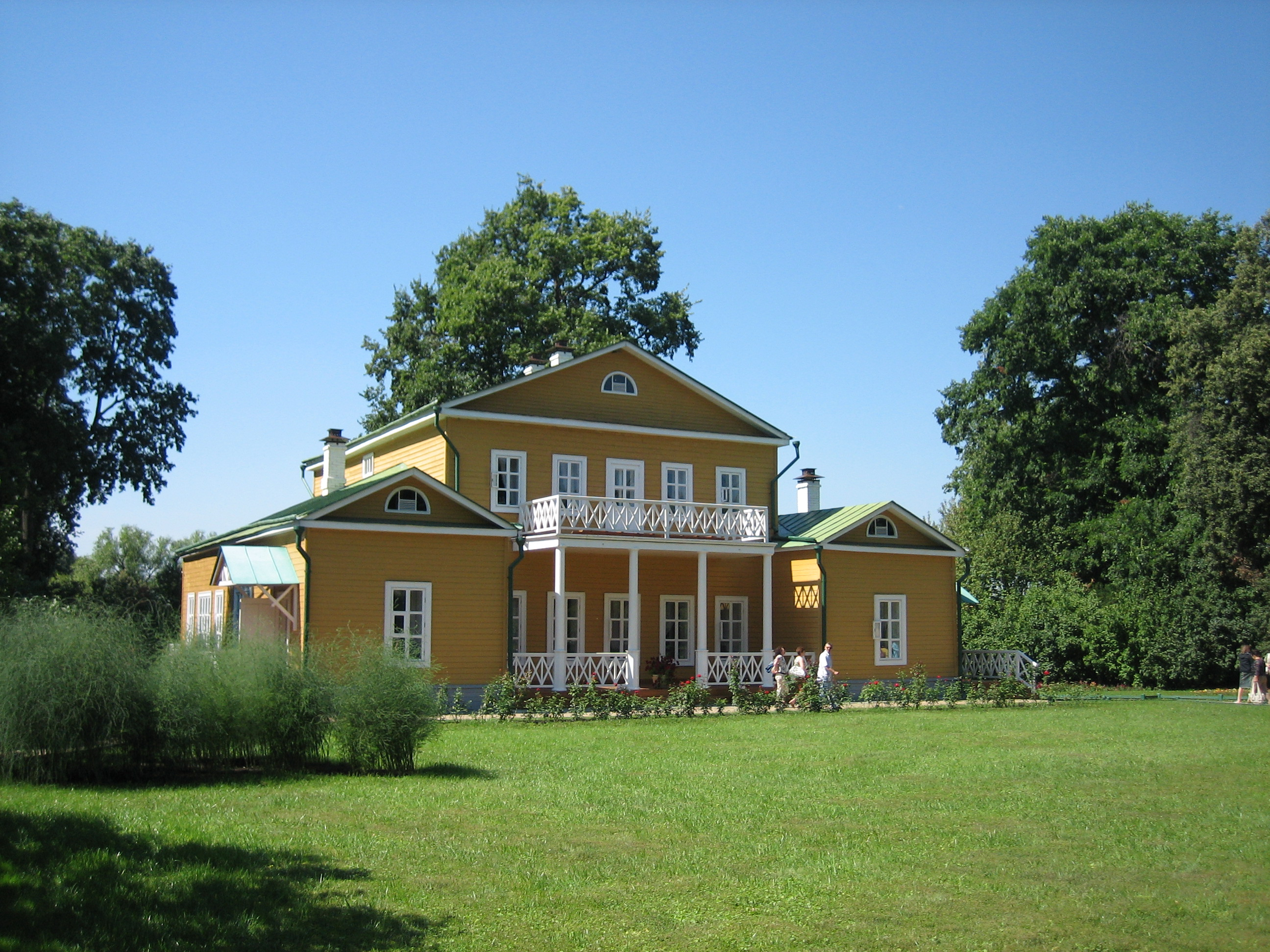
Tarkhany

Tarkhany (Russian: Тарха́ны, IPA: [tɐˈrxanɨ]) is a Writer's house museum on the Russian estate where the Romantic writer Mikhail Lermontov (1814–1841) spent his childhood and was buried. The late 18th Century–early 19th Century estate is located in the village of Lermontovo (formerly Tarkhany) in the Belinsky District of Penza Oblast.

== Buildings ==
- Manor house
- Church of St. Mary of Egypt
- The Human cottage (restored)
- Steward's house (restored)
- Arseniev Crypt and chapel
- Countryside Church of the Archangel Michael
- Lodge

== The estate today ==
The estate is now the State Lermontov Museum — Tarkhany Reserve, created in 1939. It has an area of 485.3 acres. The museum register lists about 29,000 items, including 14,500 fixed assets. In the Steward's House, videos devoted to an atmosphere in which Lermontov lived as a child and scenes from Russian folk life are shown, as well as video expositions on two of his works - his poems Borodino and A Song about Tsar Ivan Vasilyevish, the Young Oprichnik, and the Valorous Merchant Kalashnikov (dedicated to the times of Ivan the Terrible).

Traditionally on the first weekend in July a Lermontov festival is held in Tarkhany, attended by prominent figures of Russian culture. During the festival special buses are run from Penza.

An estate which was the childhood home of Vissarion Belinsky is located 17 kilometres (11 mi) southwest of Lermontovo, in the town of Belinsky.
