= Józef Rapacki =

Polish painter, watercolorist and graphic designer

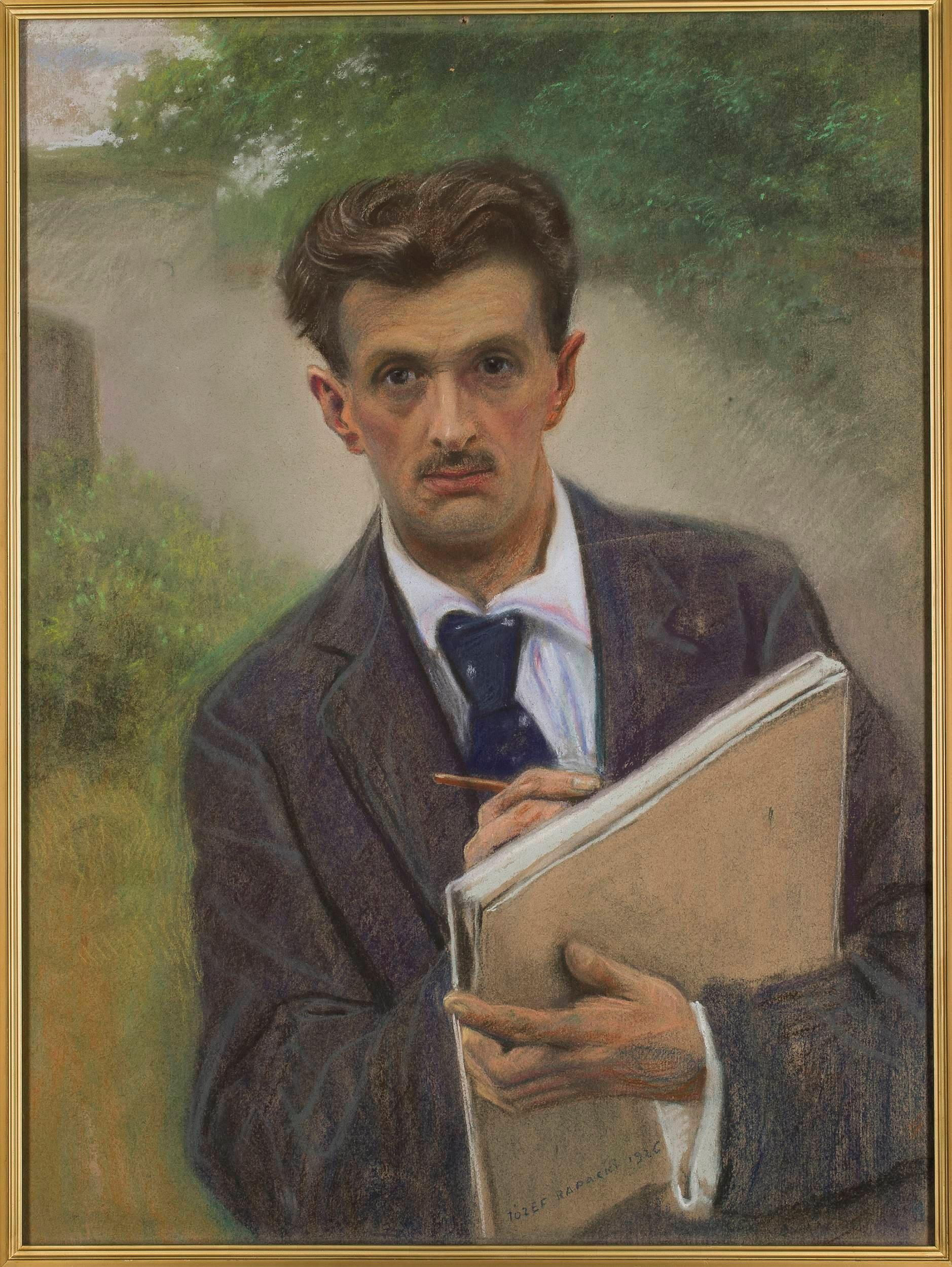
- Self-portrait (1926)
- Born: 19 March 1871; Warsaw, Congress Poland
- Died: 31 January 1929 (aged 57); Olszanka, Żyrardów County, Poland
- Education: Jan Matejko Academy of Fine Arts

Józef Rapacki (19 March 1871 – 31 January 1929) was a Polish painter, watercolorist and graphic designer; best known for his nostalgic landscapes of Mazovia.

== Biography ==
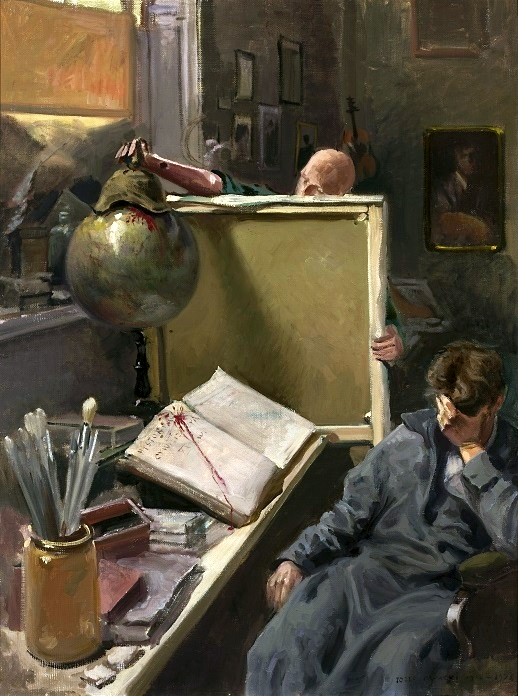
The Artist's Vision (ca. 1918–1924)

He was born in Warsaw to a theatrical family; son of the actor, Wincenty Rapacki. His brother Wincenty and sister Honorata also became actors. Jerzy Leszczyński, the actor and director, was his nephew. He decided on a different course and, at the age of fourteen, enrolled in a drawing class taught by Wojciech Gerson. After completing Gerson's course, he entered the Kraków Academy of Fine Arts, where he studied with Izydor Jabłoński, Florian Cynk and Feliks Szynalewski.

He initially painted landscapes, cityscapes and genre scenes. After a few more lessons with Gerson, he went to Munich in 1889, where he studied with the portrait painter Conrad Fehr for two years and was influenced by the Munich School. He returned to Warsaw, but continued to travel, making a major study trip to Italy around 1898.

At this time, he began providing drawings for several periodicals in Warsaw, including the famous Tygodnik Illustrowany, and illustrated works by Ignacy Krasicki. He also exhibited widely, including a showing at the Exposition Universelle (1900). Shortly after, he developed a severe lung ailment and moved to Kraków, making it easier to take convalescent trips to the mountains. During the middle part of the 1900s, he moved about frequently, including stays in Zakopane and Szczawnica.

In 1907, he finally decided on Olszanka, where he and his wife Gabriela built a house that became a gathering point for painters and writers. It was there that he concentrated on landscapes and produced some of his best-known works. During World War I, he made numerous drawings of events relating to the German occupation for the Warsaw press. Some of these were issued as Pro memoria. Prusak w Polsce (Prussian in Poland), a series of 20 lithographs that were used as propaganda during the Silesian Uprisings.

He died of complications from influenza at the age of fifty-eight.

== Selected paintings ==
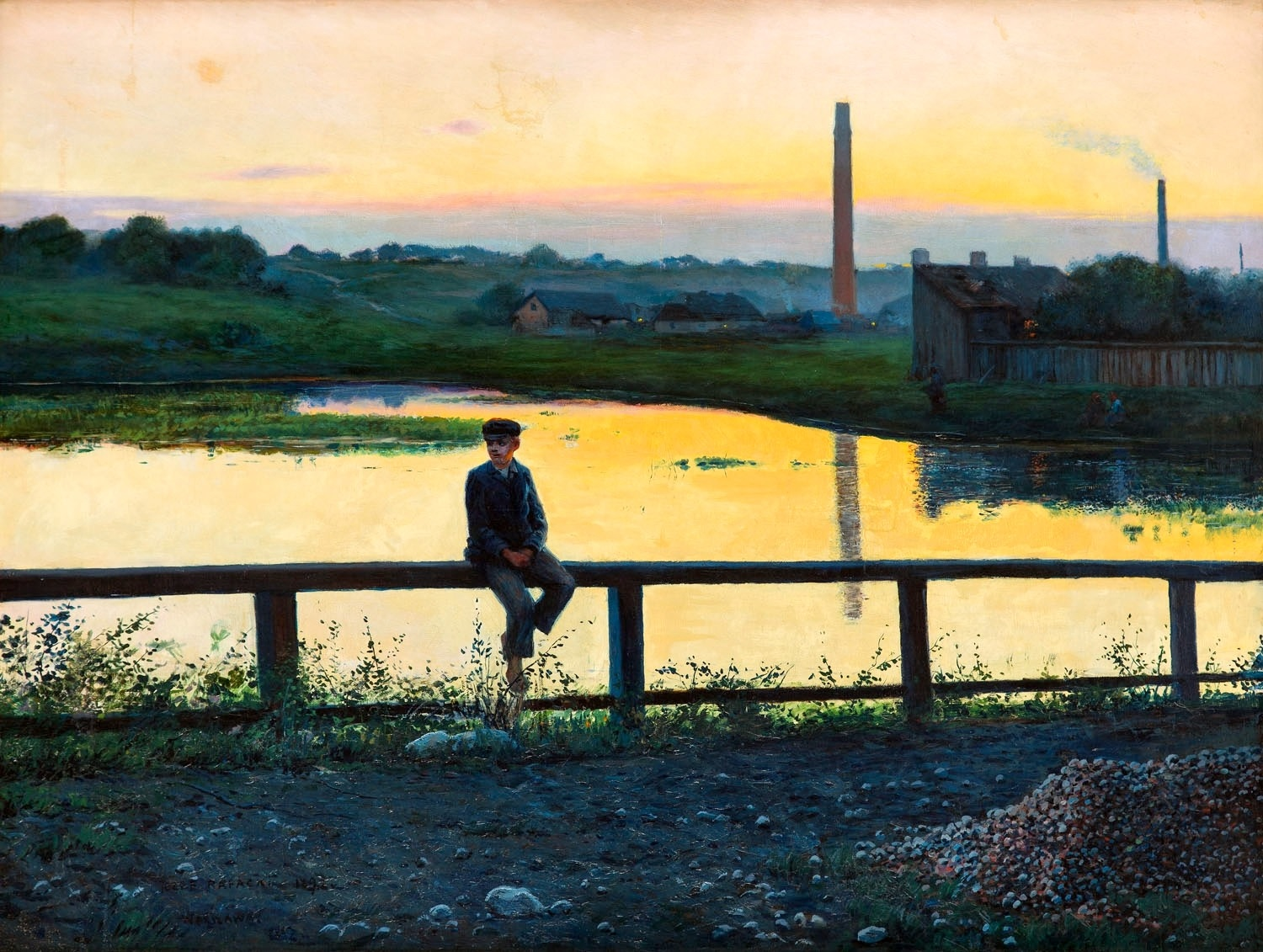
Reverie (1892)

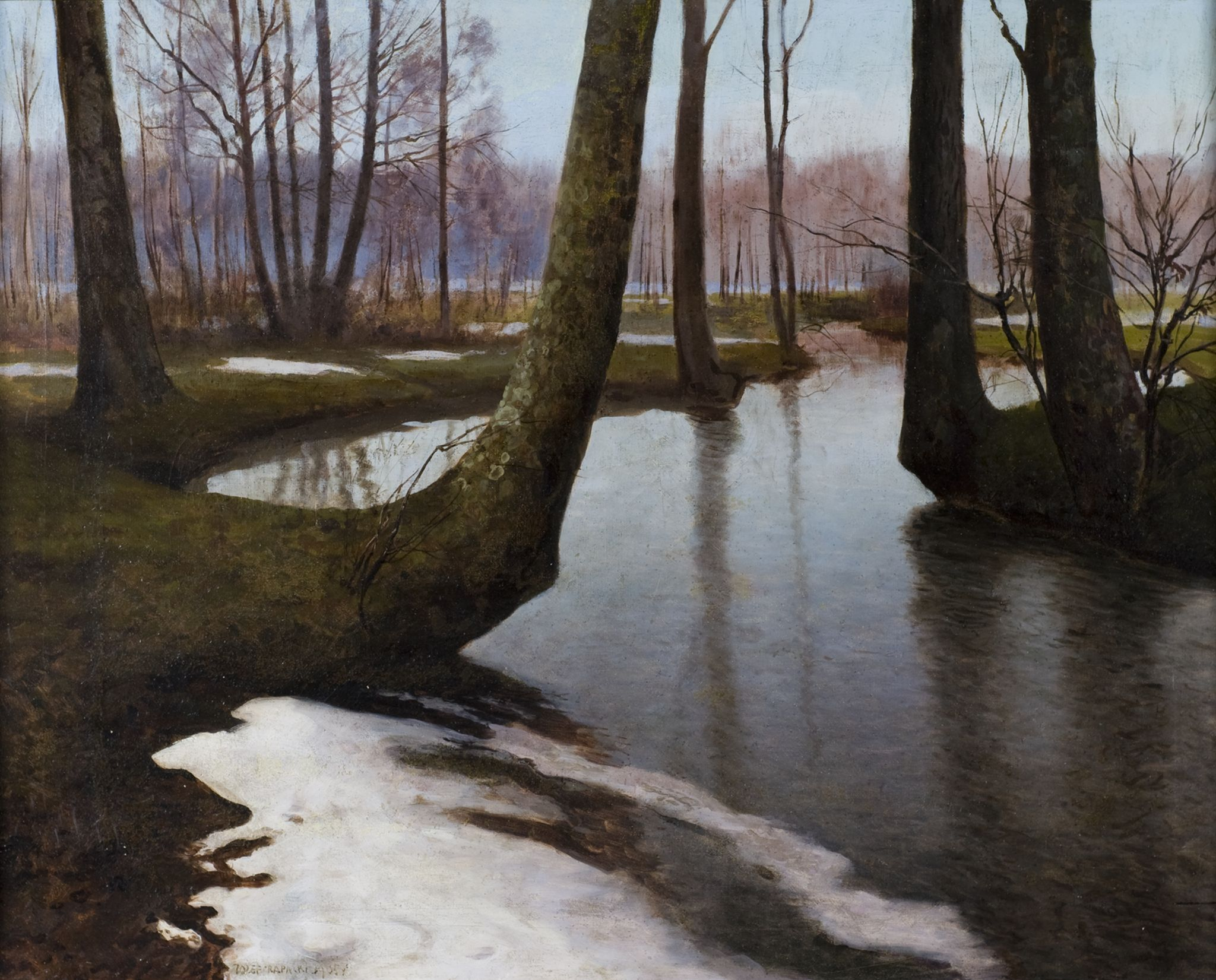
Spring Thaw (1905)

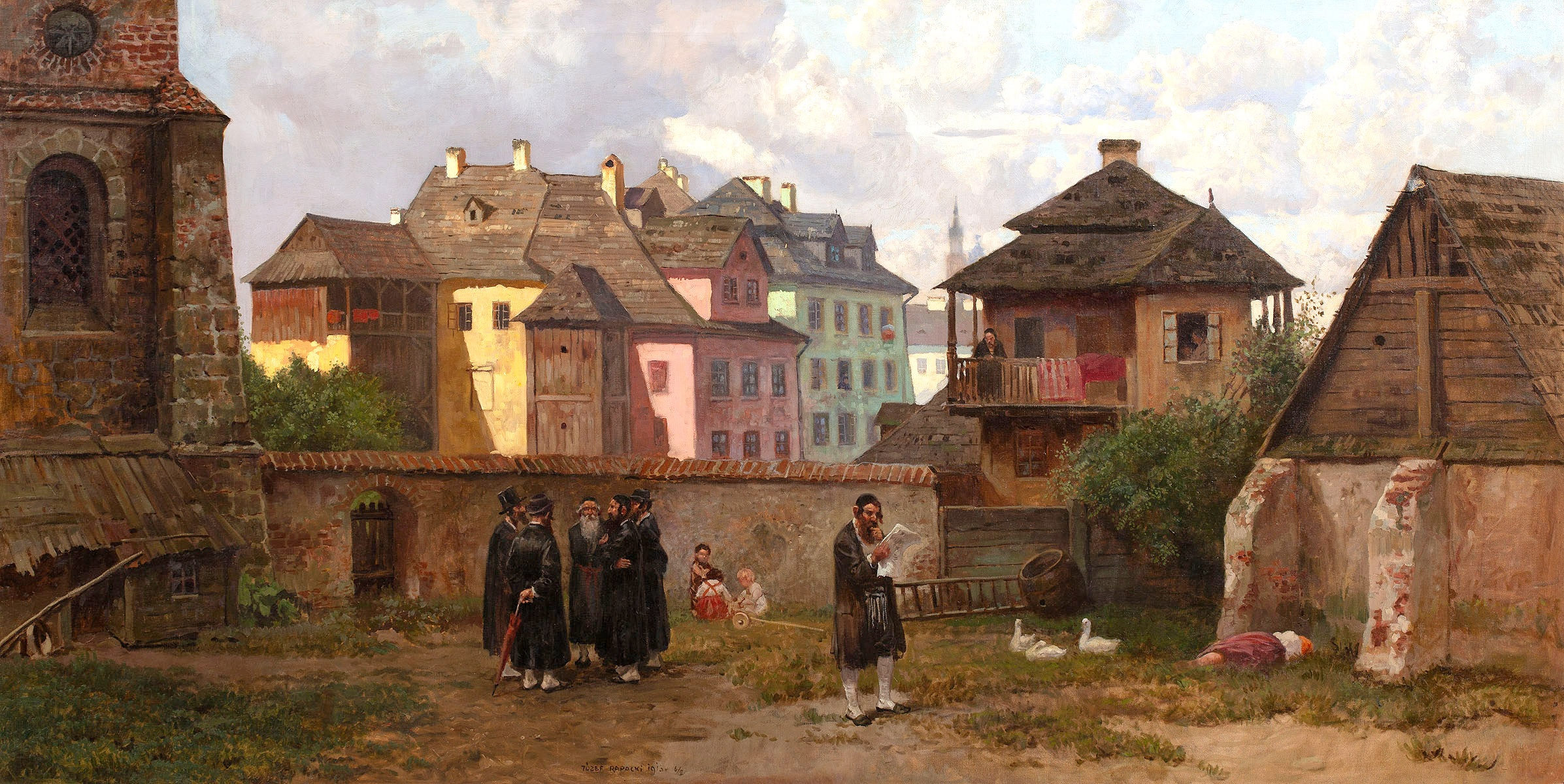
In Krakow's Kazimierz (1916)

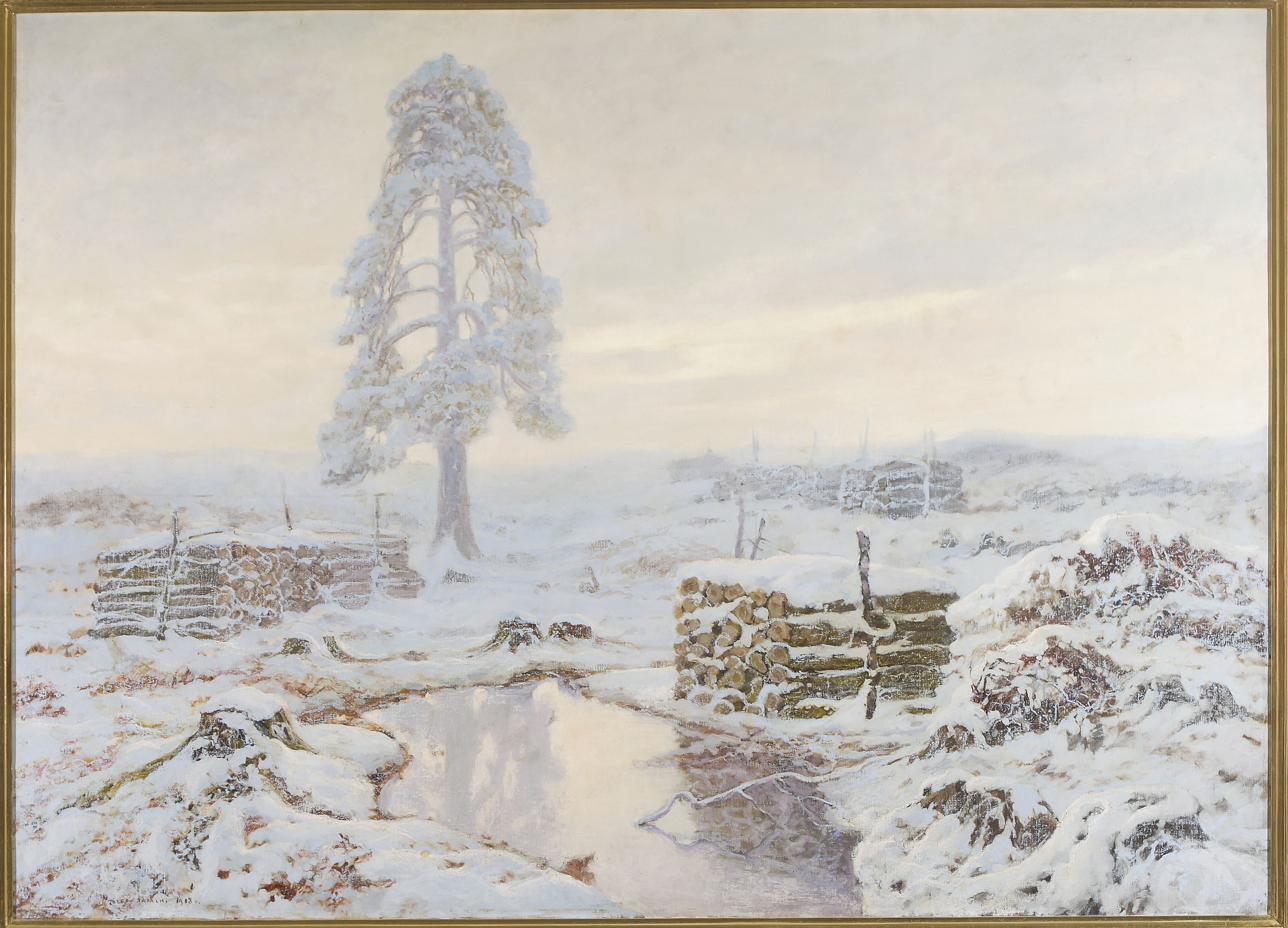
Winter landscape (1908)

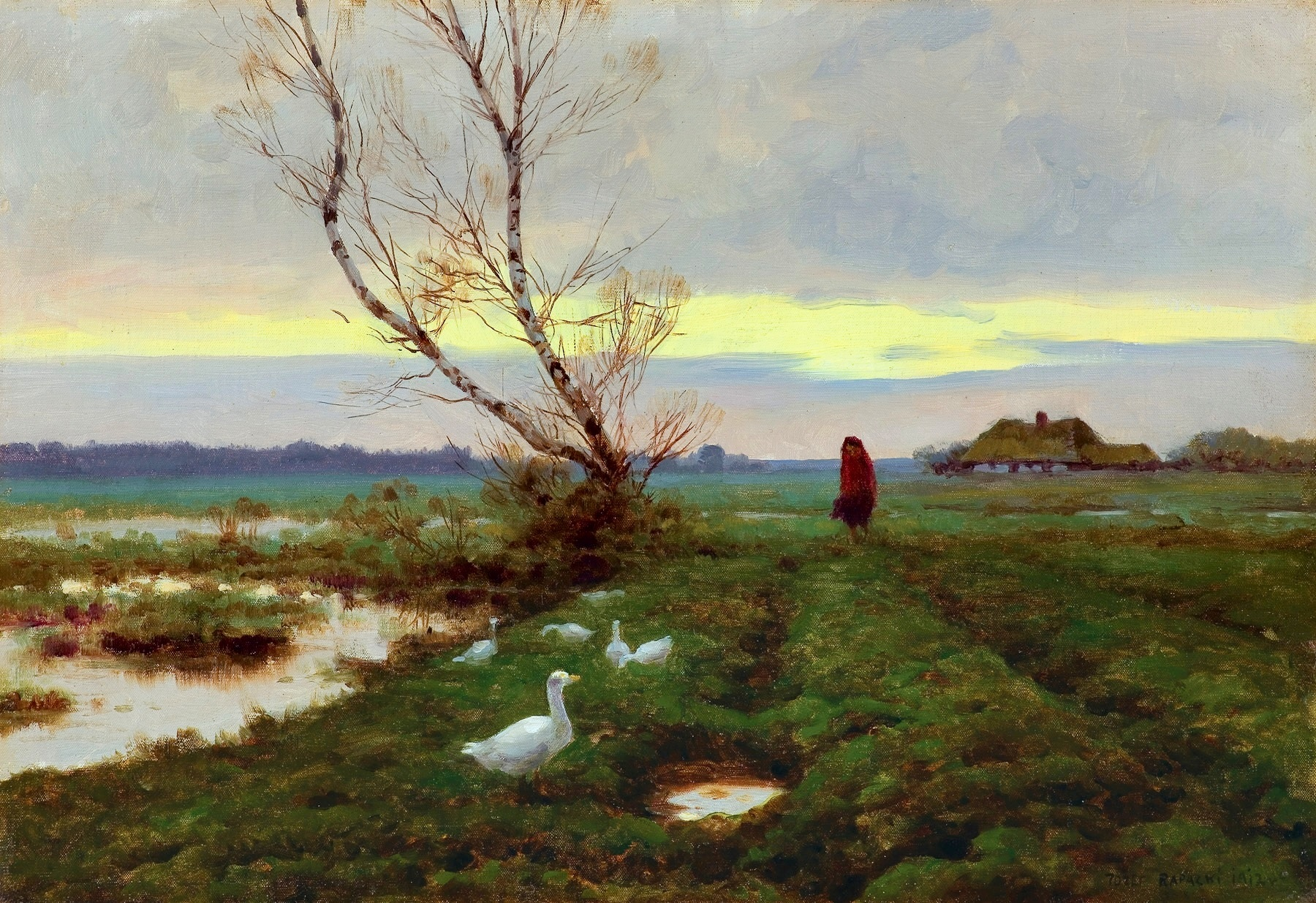
In autumn (1912)
