= Chembar =

- Native name: Чембар (Russian)

Location
- Country: Russia

Physical characteristics
- Mouth: Vorona
  - coordinates: 52.9793°N 43.1787°E
- Length: 78 km (48 mi)
- Basin size: 2,010 km^{2} (780 sq mi)

Basin features
- Progression: Vorona→ Khopyor→ Don→ Sea of Azov
- Tributaries
  - right: Maly Chembar

The Chembar (Russian: Чембар) is a river of Penza Oblast, Russia. It is a left tributary of the Vorona. It is 78 kilometres (48 mi) long, and its drainage basin covers 2,010 square kilometres (780 mi^{2}). Upstream from its confluence with the Maly Chembar near Belinsky, it is called Bolshoy Chembar.
