= 56th Rifle Division =

Infantry division

The 56th Rifle Division (Russian: 56-я стрелковая дивизия) was an infantry division of the Red Army and later the Soviet Army of the Soviet Union, formed three times.

== First formation ==
On 21 November 1919 the 56th Rifle Division (ru:56-я стрелковая дивизия (1-го формирования)) was established from a previous rifle division that had been part of the Seventh Red Army. In June 1941 it was part of the 4th Rifle Corps of the 3rd Army, and included the 37th, 184th, and 213th Rifle Regiments, supported by the 113th Artillery Regiment and the 247th Howitzer Artillery Regiment. Commanded by Major General Semyon Sakhnov, its first formation was destroyed while serving with 4th Rifle Corps by July 1941. It was officially disbanded on 19 September.

== Second formation ==
The division was reestablished on 26 September 1941 from the 7th Leningrad People's Militia Division, serving with the 42nd Army in the siege of Leningrad. It included the 37th, 184th, and the 213th Rifle Regiments, as well as the 113th Artillery Regiment, the same regimental numbers that the previous formation began the war with. The division fought around Leningrad and Riga. On 1 April 1945 it was part of the 122nd Rifle Corps, 42nd Army. It was with the 42nd Army of the Kurland Group (Leningrad Front) May 1945. It received the honorific Pushkin and the Order of the Red Banner for its actions during the war.

In September, with the 122nd Rifle Corps, the division was relocated to the Western Siberian Military District at Omsk. In 1946 it was reduced to the 20th Separate Rifle Brigade and became part of the Siberian Military District's 18th Guards Rifle Corps. In October 1953, it was reorganized as the 67th Mechanised Division. In 1957, it was reorganized as the 67th Motor Rifle Division, while the corps became an army corps. The corps was soon disbanded and the division directly subordinated to the district headquarters. On 24 May 1962, the division became a motor rifle training division, and on 11 January 1965 it was renumbered as the 56th Motor Rifle Training Division, restoring its World War II number. On 27 March 1967 it received the honorific Leningrad in recognition of its actions in World War II. In 1987, the division was reorganized into the 465th District Training Centre when all Soviet Army training divisions became training centers. In August 1993, the 465th was disbanded and its barracks taken over by the 242nd Training Centre. A small number of its personnel were used to form the 180th Motor Rifle Brigade.

== Third formation ==
On 4 March 1955, the 342nd Rifle Division was renamed and titled the 56th Rifle Division. On 17 April 1957 the 56th Motor Rifle Division was created in Khomutovo, Sakhalin Oblast from the 56th Rifle Division. On 17 November 1964 it was renumbered as the 33rd Motor Rifle Division.
