= Gavrilovka 2-ya =

Rural locality in Tambov Oblast, Russia

Coordinates: 52°52′04″N 42°48′13″E

Gavrilovka 2-ya (Russian: Гавриловка 2-я) is a rural locality (a selo) and the administrative center of Gavrilovsky District, Tambov Oblast, Russia. Population: 2,666 (2010 census); 2,780 (2002 census); 2,401 (1989 Soviet census).
