= Kirsanov (air base) =

- IATA: none; ICAO: XUWK

Summary
- Airport type: Military
- Location: Tambov Oblast, Russia
- Elevation AMSL: 584 ft / 178 m
- Coordinates: 52°40′0″N 042°41′0″E
- Interactive map of Kirsanov

Runways
Direction	Length		Surface
Direction	ft	m	Surface
	6,562	2,000	Concrete

Kirsanov is a military air base in Tambov Oblast, Russia. It is located 3 kilometers (1.9 mi) northwest of Kirsanov, and features a parallel taxiway and a runway 600 meters (2,000 ft) in length and 60 meters (200 ft) in width, a substandard length that was typical of Soviet military air bases built in the 1950s.
