= Alexander Bychkov =

Russian serial killer

- Born: Alexander Vladimirovich Bychkov; 1 April 1988 (age 38); RSFSR, Soviet Union
- Other names: Belinsky Cannibal; Rambo
- Convictions: Murder, burglary, cannibalism
- Penalty: Life imprisonment

Details
- Victims: 9–11
- Span of crimes: 2009–2012
- Country: Russia
- State: Penza Oblast
- Date apprehended: January 2012

Alexander Vladimirovich Bychkov (Russian: Александр Владимирович Бычков; born 1 April 1988) is a Russian serial killer and cannibal convicted for the murder of nine men in Belinsky, Penza Oblast between 2009 and 2012.

Bychkov targeted elderly men, alcoholics, and homeless men around Belinsky, and after his arrest Bychkov claimed to have cannibalized his victims. Bychkov is believed to have killed up to 11 people based on evidence discovered in his home.

== Background ==
Alexander Vladimirovich Bychkov was born on 1 April 1988, to Irina and Vladimir Bychkov. The Bychkov family resided in a house bought by Alexander's paternal grandmother, near Belinsky, and two years later his younger brother Sergei was born. Irina forced her children to work hard on the family vegetable garden from a young age. The boys were also forced to work for money for their neighbours, as well as collecting metal scrap, and would be beaten if they returned home with no money. Bychkov and his brother also committed petty thefts, for which they were caught several times but pitied by their target every time.

Both of Bychkov's parents suffered from alcoholism, and at the age of 40, Vladimir Bychkov committed suicide by hanging himself. According to neighbours, Vladimir's alcoholism and suicide were caused by the supposed infidelity of his wife.

In the late 2000s, Sergei was badly beaten and suffered a traumatic brain injury after being thrown from a car while it was in motion. Alexander had to leave college in order to take care of his brother, who did survive, but became disabled.

== Murders ==
On 17 September 2009, Bychkov committed his first murder, of 60-year-old Yevgeni Zhidkov whom he had met at a local tavern. Zhidkov was heading to the Belinsky district archive in order to fill out the documents needed for drawing a pension. Bychkov offered Zhidkov a place to sleep overnight at his home. When the two men arrived at Bychkov's house and the elderly man fell asleep, Bychkov stabbed his victim to death and dismembered the corpse.

Bychkov, who called himself "Rambo", committed more murders over the next few years, targeting mainly men who suffered from alcoholism or were homeless. He would lure victims to his home or another secluded place, where Bychkov killed them with a hammer or knife, and then dismembered the corpses. The remains were buried in the backyard of his house or in the city's rubbish dump. Bychkov decided to kill in the warm seasons in order to make the police suspect temporary migrant workers.

Bychkov also killed a man who started to suspect him of the murders and tried to blackmail him.

The first dismembered corpse was found in the Spring of 2010 which belonged to Sergei Berezovsky, an ex-partner of Alexander's mother, Irina Bychkova. In September of the same year, two more dismembered corpses were found. Alexander Zhuplov, a local mentally ill man, was arrested for the murders on 19 September 2010. Zhuplov confessed to all three of the murders; he was found guilty of all three and sent to a mental institution.

== Arrest ==
On the night of 21 January 2012 Alexander Bychkov broke into a hardware store, stealing three knives and money totaling 9,908 Russian rubles (equivalent to US$320 now) but he was arrested several days later. Police found in his home a personal diary in which the author, calling himself a "lone wolf", claimed to be responsible for 11 murders. In the diary he also wrote that he began to murder after being kicked out by his girlfriend.

Upon being questioned by police, Bychkov claimed that he ate livers, hearts and muscle of his victims.

== Trial and conviction ==
Bychkov was diagnosed with mixed personality disorder but declared mentally competent to stand trial. He was found guilty of nine murders and a burglary. The bodies of the two other victims mentioned in the diary were not found. On 22 March 2013 Bychkov was sentenced to life imprisonment by the Penza Oblast Court.

Lyubov Zhuplova, mother of Alexander Zhuplov, made a petition to Rashid Nurgaliyev at the time of his service as the Minister of Internal Affairs in Russia, asking for reviewing the case of her son. It became possible only after the sentencing of Bychkov.

== See also ==
- Alexander Spesivtsev
- Nikolai Dzhumagaliev
- List of incidents of cannibalism
- List of Russian serial killers
- List of serial killers by number of victims
