= Samoylovka, Republic of Bashkortostan =

Samoylovka Самойловка
- Village
- Location within Bashkortostan Location within Russia
- Coordinates: 52°56′N 55°58′E
- Country: Russia
- Region: Bashkortostan
- District: Meleuzovsky District
- Time zone: UTC+5:00

For other inhabited localities of the same name, see Samoylovka

Samoylovka (Russian: Самойловка) is a rural locality (a village) in Pervomaysky Selsoviet, Meleuzovsky District, Bashkortostan, Russia. The population was 273 as of 2010. There are 11 streets.

== Geography ==
Samoylovka is located 7 km east of Meleuz (the district's administrative centre) by road. Tyulyakovo is the nearest rural locality.
