= Halina Rapacka =

Polish actress (1901–1979)

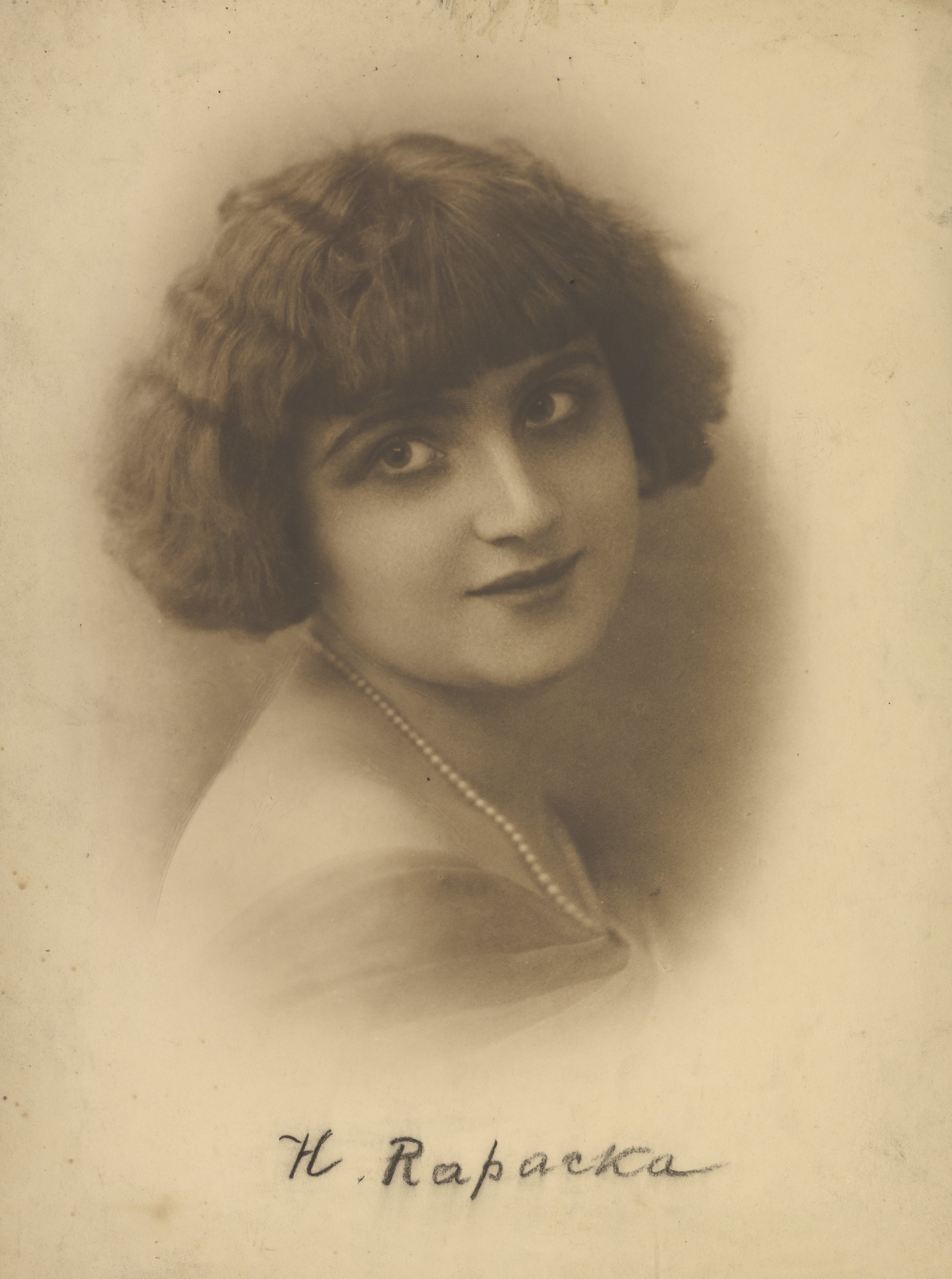
Halina rapacka (c.1930)

Halina Rapacka (Warsaw, 3 May 1901 - London, 21 January 1979) was a Polish actress who in 1921–1922 and 1923–25 played operettas at the City Theaters in Lwów. In May 1931 Rapacka performed in the Metropolis theater in Poznań.

During the German occupation of Poland she wrote in the occupation press what was regarded as collaboration. In 1942 she won the anti-typhoid play competition announced by the General Government's propaganda department (from the Nazi propaganda poster about Jews). Her play entitled The Quarantine was staged by the Traveling Theater throughout the General Government. The play had an antisemitic character: emphasizing the alleged handicap of a lower race (Jews, Roma) and urged the surrender of Jews in hiding to the occupation authorities.

In 1944, during the Warsaw Uprising, Rapacka moved for labour to Bregenz in Austria (then Nazi Germany). After the war in 1948, she moved to London where she lived with her mother. Later, Rapacka married and lived with her husband. She was tried in absentia for cooperation with the Germans in the August 1949 trials and sentenced to 10 years in prison.
