= Samoylovka, Saratov Oblast =

Samoylovka Самойловка
- Urban-type settlement
- Interactive map of Samoylovka
- Location of Samoylovka Samoylovka (Saratov Oblast)
- Coordinates: 51.1862°N 43.7080°E
- Country: Russia
- Federal subject: Saratov Oblast
- Administrative district: Samoylovsky District

Population (2010 Census)
  - Total: 7,580
  - Estimate (2021): 6,571 (−13.3%)
- Time zone: UTC+4 (MSK+1)
- Postal code: 412370
- OKTMO ID: 63642151051

For other inhabited localities of the same name, see Samoylovka

Samoylovka (Russian: Само́йловка) is an urban locality (an urban-type settlement) in Samoylovsky District of Saratov Oblast, Russia. Population: 7,580 (2010 census); 8,648 (2002 census); 8,460 (1989 Soviet census).
