= Kirsanovsky District =

Kirsanovsky District Кирсановский район (Russian)
- District
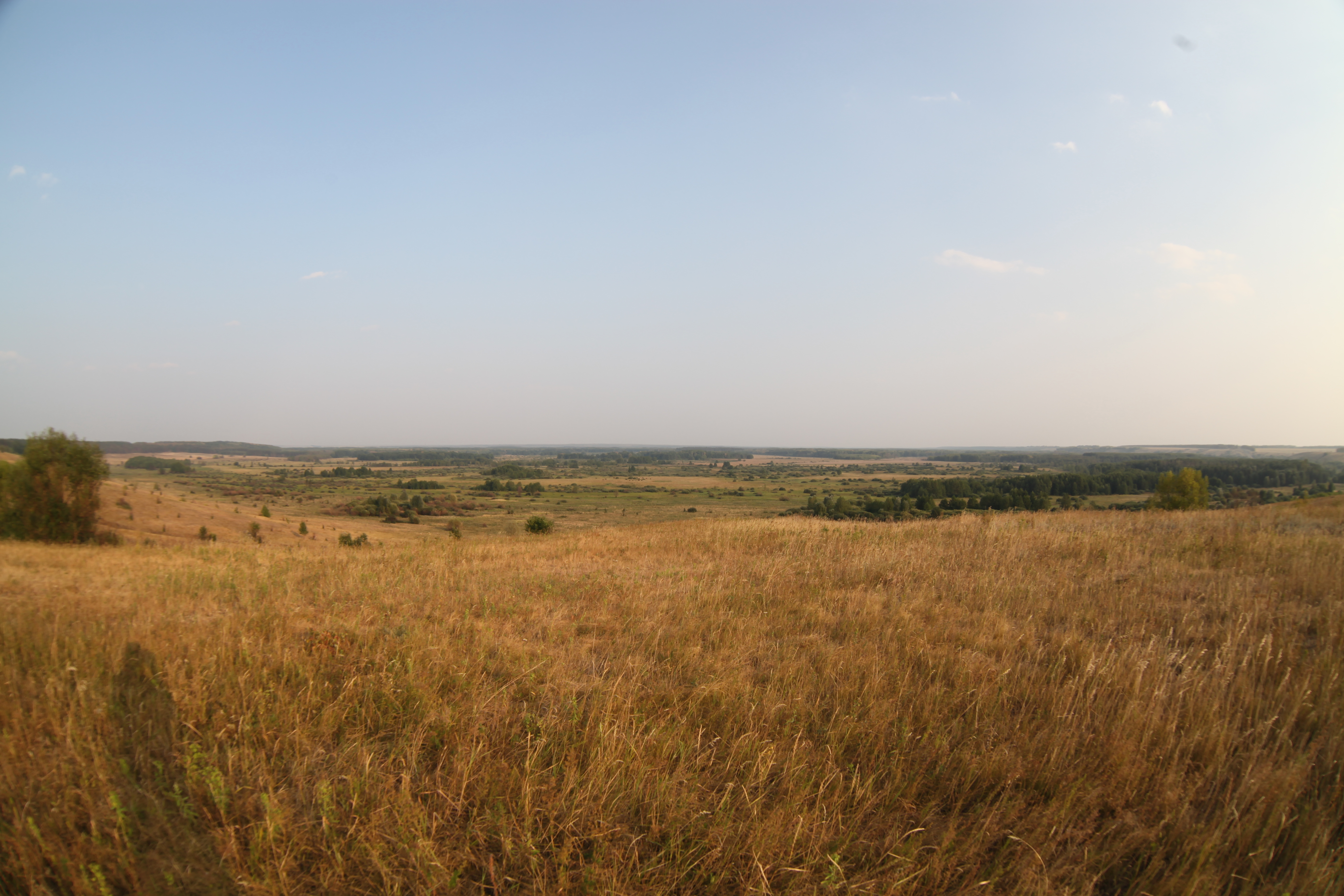
- Kirsanovsky District

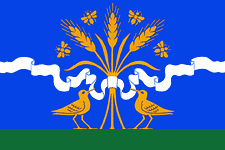
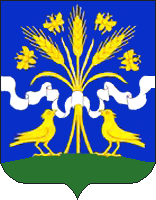
- Flag Coat of arms
- Location of Kirsanovsky District in Tambov Oblast
- Coordinates: 52°39′N 42°44′E
- Country: Russia
- Federal subject: Tambov Oblast
- Established: 1928
- Administrative center: Kirsanov

Area
  - Total: 1,307.8 km^{2} (504.9 sq mi)

Population (2010 Census)
  - Total: 21,756
  - Density: 16.636/km^{2} (43.086/sq mi)
  - Urban: 0%
  - Rural: 100%

Administrative structure
  - Administrative divisions: 8 Selsoviets
  - Inhabited localities: 84 rural localities

Municipal structure
  - Municipally incorporated as: Kirsanovsky Municipal District
  - Municipal divisions: 0 urban settlements, 8 rural settlements
- Time zone: UTC+3 (MSK)
- OKTMO ID: 68610000
- Website: http://r37.tambov.gov.ru/

Kirsanovsky District (Russian: Кирса́новский райо́н) is an administrative and municipal district (raion), one of the twenty-three in Tambov Oblast, Russia. It is located in the east of the oblast. The district borders with Gavrilovsky District in the north, Umyotsky District in the east, Inzhavinsky District in the south, and with Rasskazovsky District in the west. The area of the district is 1,307.8 square kilometers (504.9 sq mi). Its administrative center is the town of Kirsanov (which is not administratively a part of the district). Population: 21,756 (2010 Census); 23,613 (2002 census); 24,780 (1989 Soviet census).

== Administrative and municipal status ==
Within the framework of administrative divisions, Kirsanovsky District is one of the twenty-three in the oblast. The town of Kirsanov serves as its administrative center, despite being incorporated separately as a town of oblast significance—an administrative unit with the status equal to that of the districts.

As a municipal division, the district is incorporated as Kirsanovsky Municipal District. The town of oblast significance of Kirsanov is incorporated separately from the district as Kirsanov Urban Okrug.

== Notable residents ==
- Yevgeny Baratynsky (1800–1844), elegiac poet, born in Vyazhlya
