= Kirsanov =

Town in Tambov Oblast, Russia

Kirsanov Кирсанов
- Town
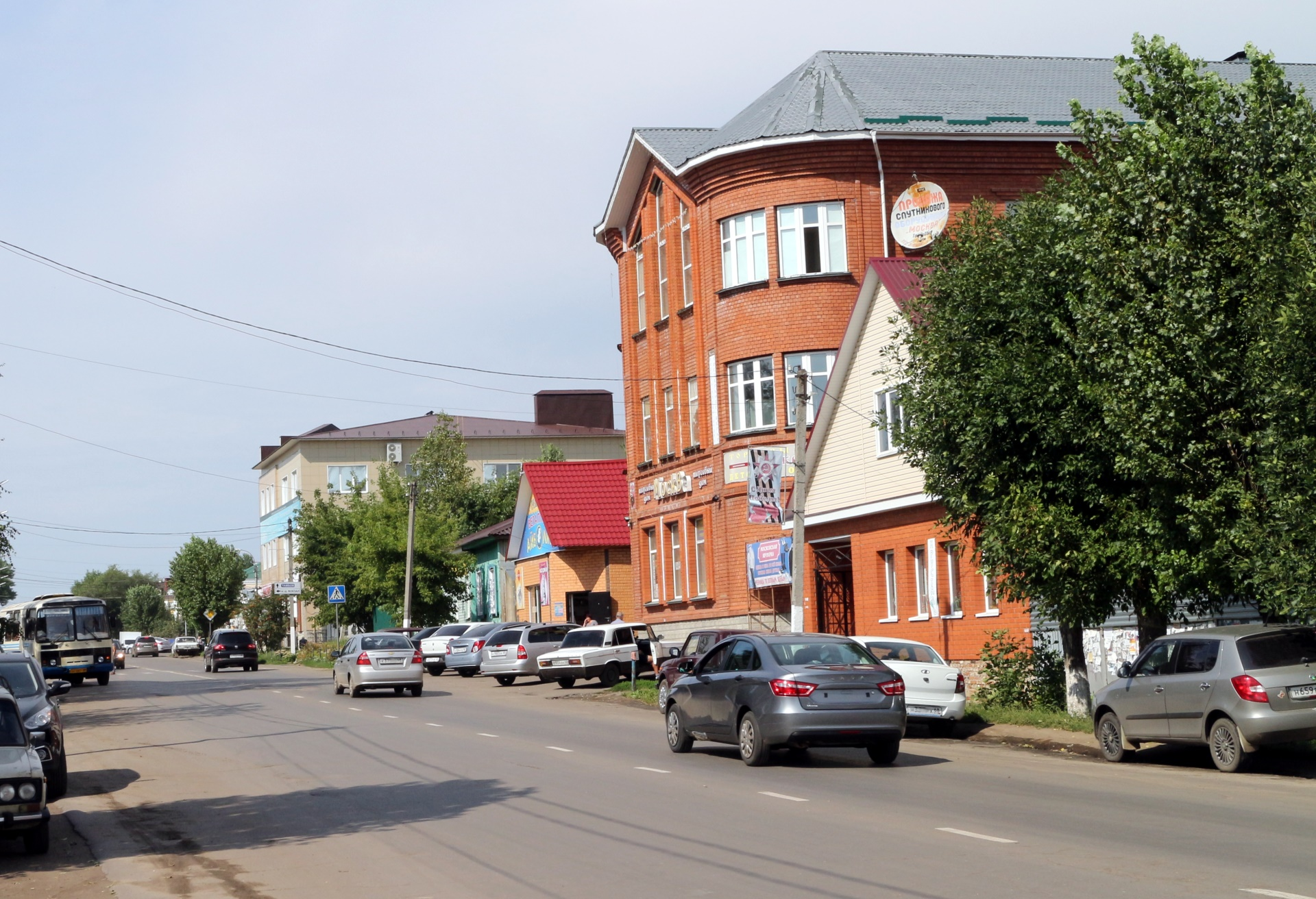

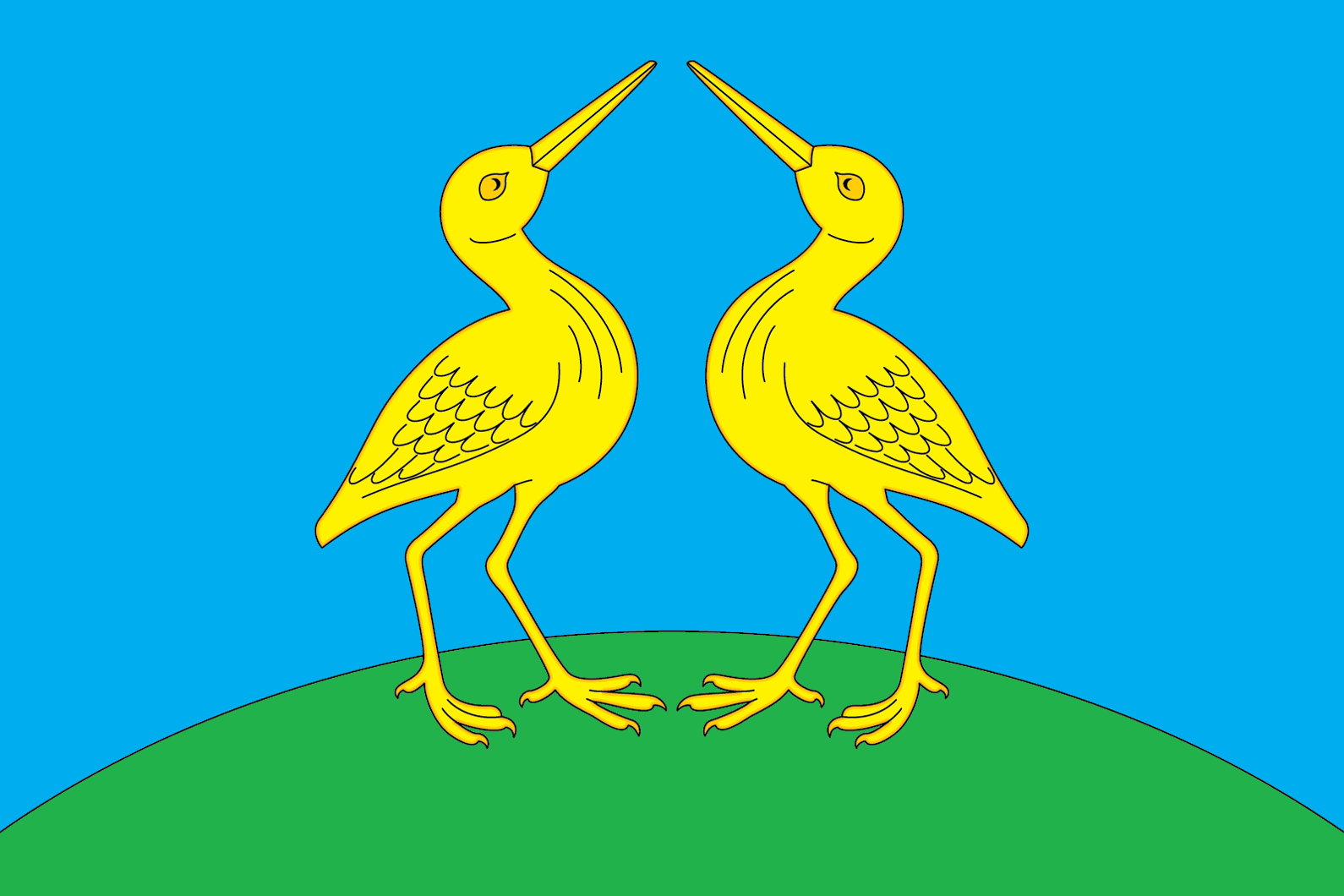
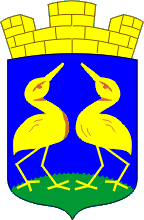
- Flag Coat of arms
- Interactive map of Kirsanov
- Location of Kirsanov Kirsanov (Tambov Oblast)
- Coordinates: 52°39′N 42°44′E
- Country: Russia
- Federal subject: Tambov Oblast
- First mentioned: 1702
- Town status since: 1779

Area
  - Total: 10.9 km^{2} (4.2 sq mi)
- Elevation: 140 m (460 ft)

Population (2010 Census)
  - Total: 17,224
  - Estimate (2021): 16,164 (−6.2%)
  - Density: 1,580/km^{2} (4,090/sq mi)

Administrative status
  - Subordinated to: town of oblast significance of Kirsanov
  - Capital of: Kirsanovsky District, town of oblast significance of Kirsanov

Municipal status
  - Urban okrug: Kirsanov Urban Okrug
  - Capital of: Kirsanov Urban Okrug, Kirsanovsky Municipal District
- Time zone: UTC+3 (MSK)
- Postal code: 393360–393366
- Dialing code: +7 47537
- OKTMO ID: 68705000001

Kirsanov (Russian: Кирса́нов) is a town in Tambov Oblast, Russia, located on the Vorona River at its confluence with the Pursovka River 95 kilometers (59 mi) east of Tambov. Population: 17,224 (2010 census); 18,506 (2002 census); 20,754 (1989 Soviet census).

== History ==
It was founded in the first half of the 17th century as a settlement of Kirsanovo (Кирса́ново), named after Kirsan Zubakin, the first settler in the area. It was granted town status in 1779. In 1875, a railroad was built through Kirsanov, which connected Tambov and Saratov.

== Administrative and municipal status ==
Within the framework of administrative divisions, Kirsanov serves as the administrative center of Kirsanovsky District, even though it is not a part of it. As an administrative division, it is incorporated separately as the town of oblast significance of Kirsanov—an administrative unit with the status equal to that of the districts. As a municipal division, the town of oblast significance of Kirsanov is incorporated as Kirsanov Urban Okrug.

== Military ==
It is home to Kirsanov air base.
