= Olszanka, Żyrardów County =

Olszanka
- Village
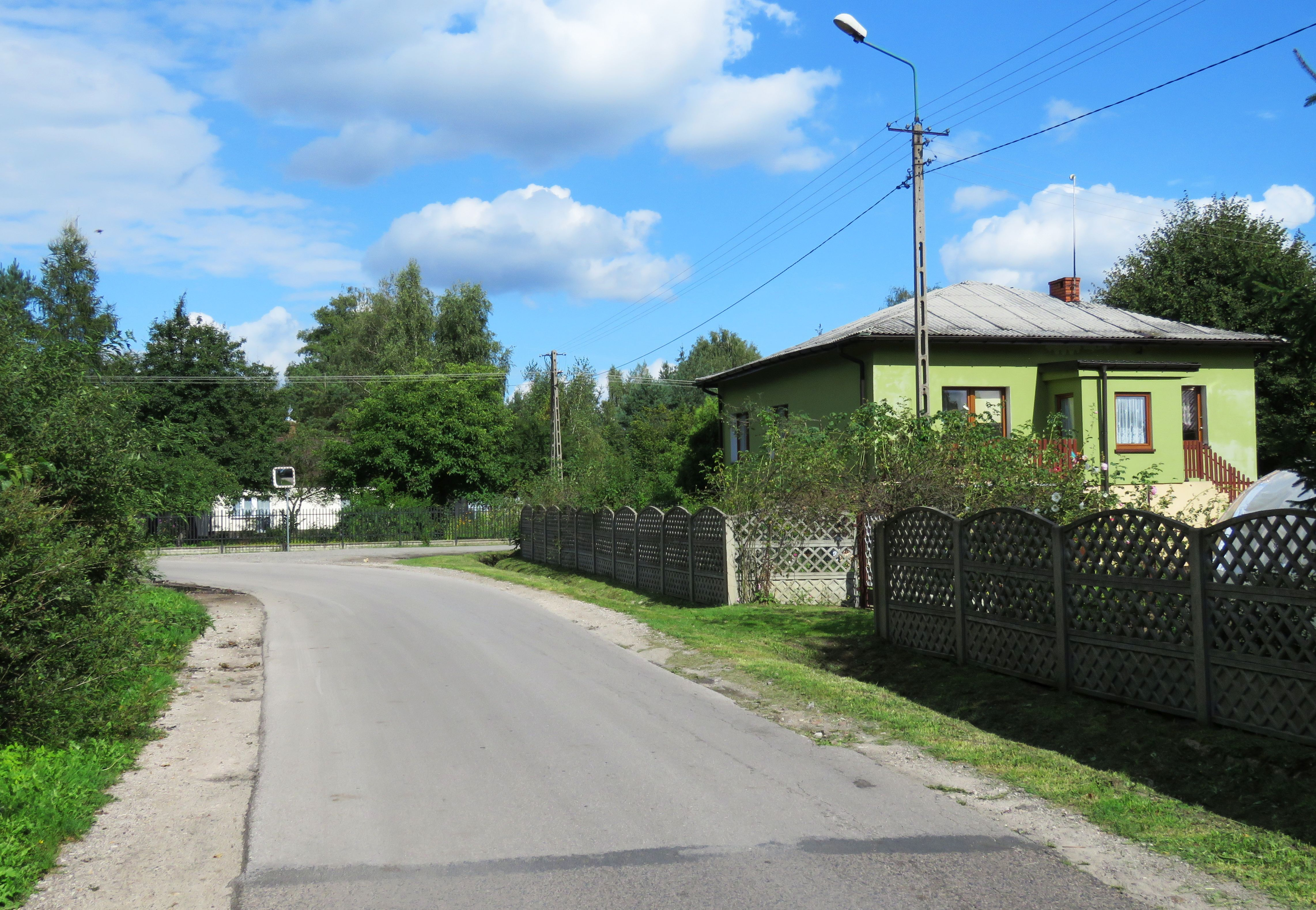

- Location within Poland
- Coordinates: 51°58′20″N 20°21′21″E
- Country: Poland
- Voivodeship: Masovian
- County: Żyrardów
- Gmina: Puszcza Mariańska

Olszanka [ɔlˈʂaŋka] is a village in the administrative district of Gmina Puszcza Mariańska, within Żyrardów County, Masovian Voivodeship, in east-central Poland.
