= Samoylovsky District =

Samoylovsky District Самойловский район (Russian)
- District
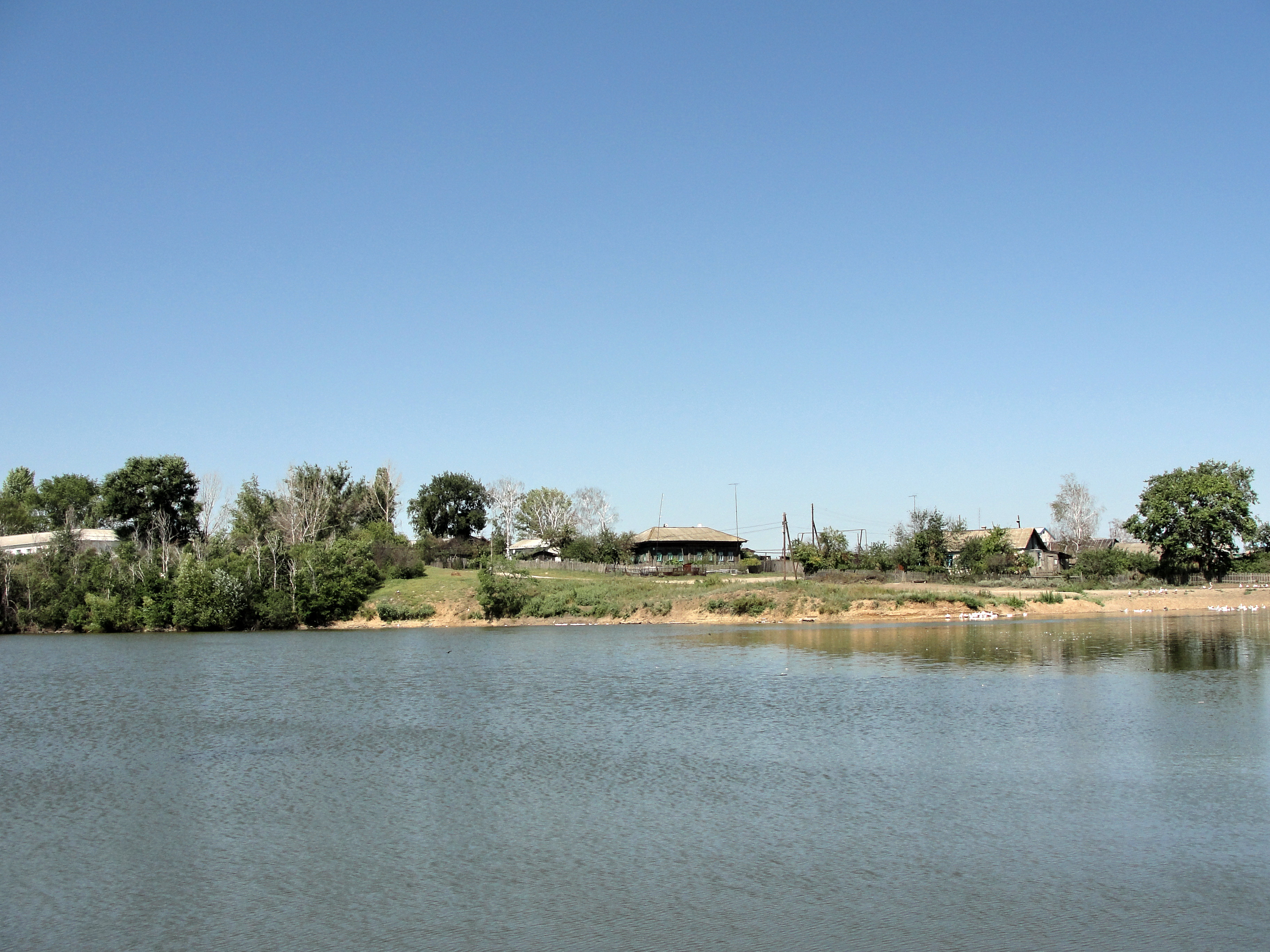
- Barsky, in Samoylovsky District

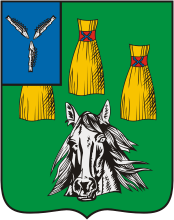
- Coat of arms
- Location of Samoylovsky District in Saratov Oblast
- Coordinates: 51°10′41″N 43°41′50″E
- Country: Russia
- Federal subject: Saratov Oblast
- Established: 23 July 1928
- Administrative center: Samoylovka

Area
  - Total: 2,500 km^{2} (970 sq mi)

Population (2010 Census)
  - Total: 21,451
  - Density: 8.6/km^{2} (22/sq mi)
  - Urban: 35.3%
  - Rural: 64.7%

Administrative structure
  - Inhabited localities: 1 urban-type settlements, 38 rural localities

Municipal structure
  - Municipally incorporated as: Samoylovsky Municipal District
  - Municipal divisions: 1 urban settlements, 7 rural settlements
- Time zone: UTC+4 (MSK+1)
- OKTMO ID: 63642000
- Website: http://samoylovka.sarmo.ru/

Samoylovsky District (Russian: Самойловский райо́н) is an administrative and municipal district (raion), one of the thirty-eight in Saratov Oblast, Russia. It is located in the west of the oblast. The area of the district is 2,500 square kilometers (970 sq mi). Its administrative center is the urban locality (a work settlement) of Samoylovka. Population: 21,451 (2010 Census); 25,979 (2002 census); 26,125 (1989 Soviet census). The population of Samoylovka accounts for 35.3% of the district's total population.
