= Vorona (Khopyor) =

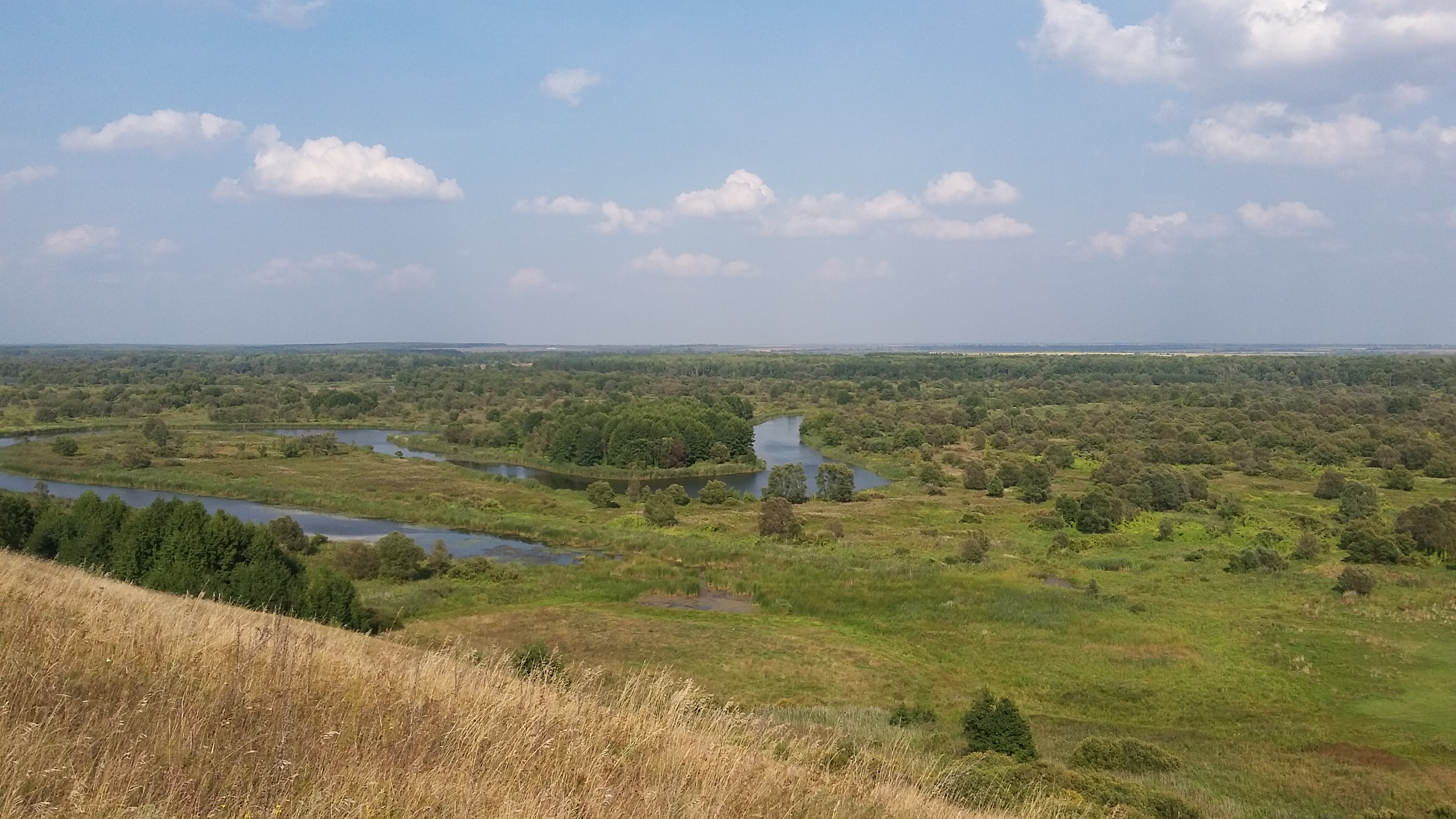
- Native name: Ворона (Russian)

Location
- Country: Russia

Physical characteristics
- Mouth: Khopyor
  - coordinates: 51°21′01″N 42°02′21″E
- Length: 454 km (282 mi)
- Basin size: 13,200 km^{2} (5,100 sq mi)

Basin features
- Progression: Khopyor→ Don→ Sea of Azov
- Tributaries
  - left: Chembar

The Vorona (Russian: Ворона) is a river in the Penza, Tambov, and Voronezh oblasts in Russia. It is a right tributary of the Khopyor, and is 454 kilometres (282 mi) long, with a drainage basin of 13,200 square kilometres (5,100 mi^{2}). The average discharge at the mouth is 41.5 cubic metres per second (1,470 cu ft/s). The river is frozen over from the beginning of December to the first half of April. Its main tributary is the Chembar.

The towns of Kirsanov, Uvarovo, and Borisoglebsk are along the Vorona.
