= Belinsky, Penza Oblast =

Town in Penza Oblast, Russia

Belinsky Белинский
- Town
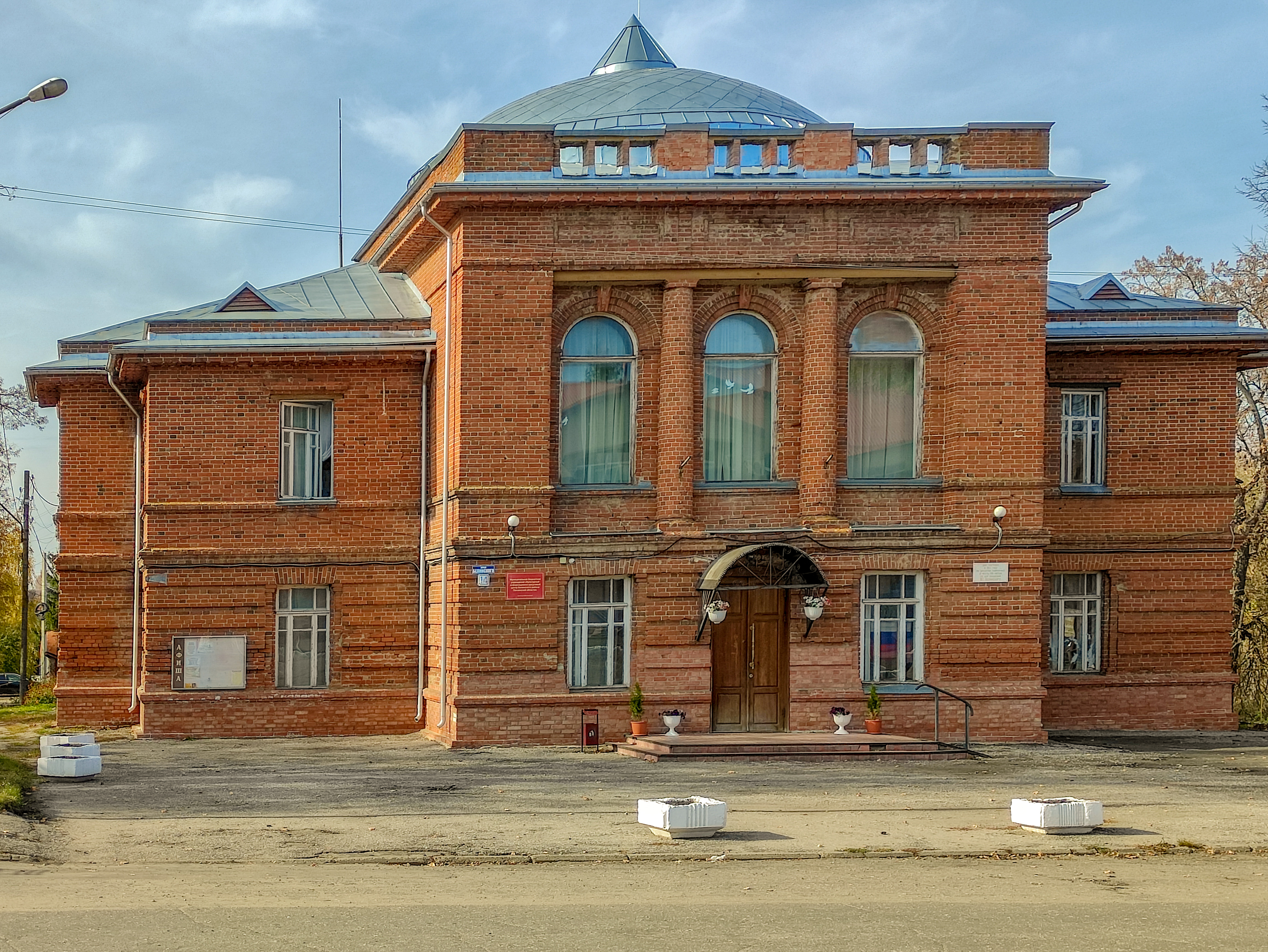

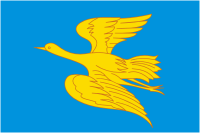
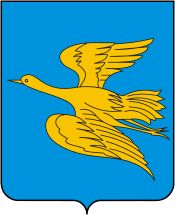
- Flag Coat of arms
- Interactive map of Belinsky
- Location of Belinsky Belinsky (Penza Oblast)
- Coordinates: 52°58′N 43°26′E
- Country: Russia
- Federal subject: Penza Oblast
- Administrative district: Belinsky District
- Town of district significanceSelsoviet: Belinsky
- Founded: 1713 (first mentioned), 1801 (re-established)
- Town status since: 1801
- Elevation: 190 m (620 ft)

Population (2010 Census)
  - Total: 8,565
  - Estimate (2021): 8,656 (+1.1%)

Administrative status
  - Capital of: Belinsky District, town of district significance of Belinsky

Municipal status
  - Municipal district: Belinsky Municipal District
  - Urban settlement: Belinsky Urban Settlement
  - Capital of: Belinsky Municipal District, Belinsky Urban Settlement
- Time zone: UTC+3 (MSK)
- Postal codes: 442250, 442289
- OKTMO ID: 56612101001
- Website: gbelinsk.belinskij.pnzreg.ru

Belinsky (Russian: Бели́нский) is a town and the administrative center of Belinsky District in Penza Oblast, Russia, located at the confluence of the rivers Bolshoy Chembar and Maly Chembar, 129 kilometers (80 mi) west of Penza, the administrative center of the oblast. Population: 8,565 (2010 census); 8,837 (2002 census); 9,028 (1989 Soviet census).

It was previously known as Chembar (until 1948).

== History ==
It was first mentioned in 1713. In 1780, it was granted town status and named Chembar (Чембар). In 1798, it was abolished, but in 1801 it was re-instated as a town. In 1948, it was renamed after Vissarion Belinsky who spent his childhood here.

During the Red Terror 48 inhabitants of the town and surrounding villages were shot without trial on 25 September 1918. On 30 October 2012, thanks to the town’s inhabitants and staff from the museum at Belinsky’s estate, a memorial bearing the names of those shot was set up on the town’s central square.

== Administrative and municipal status ==
Within the framework of administrative divisions, Belinsky serves as the administrative center of Belinsky District. As an administrative division, it is incorporated within Belinsky District as the town of district significance of Belinsky . As a municipal division, the town of district significance of Belinsky is incorporated within Belinsky Municipal District as Belinsky Urban Settlement.

== Notable residents ==
- Alexander Bychkov (born 1988), serial killer 2009–2012
- Miroslav Katětov (1918–1995), Czech mathematician, chess master, and psychologist
