= Belinsky District =

Belinsky District Белинский район (Russian)
- District
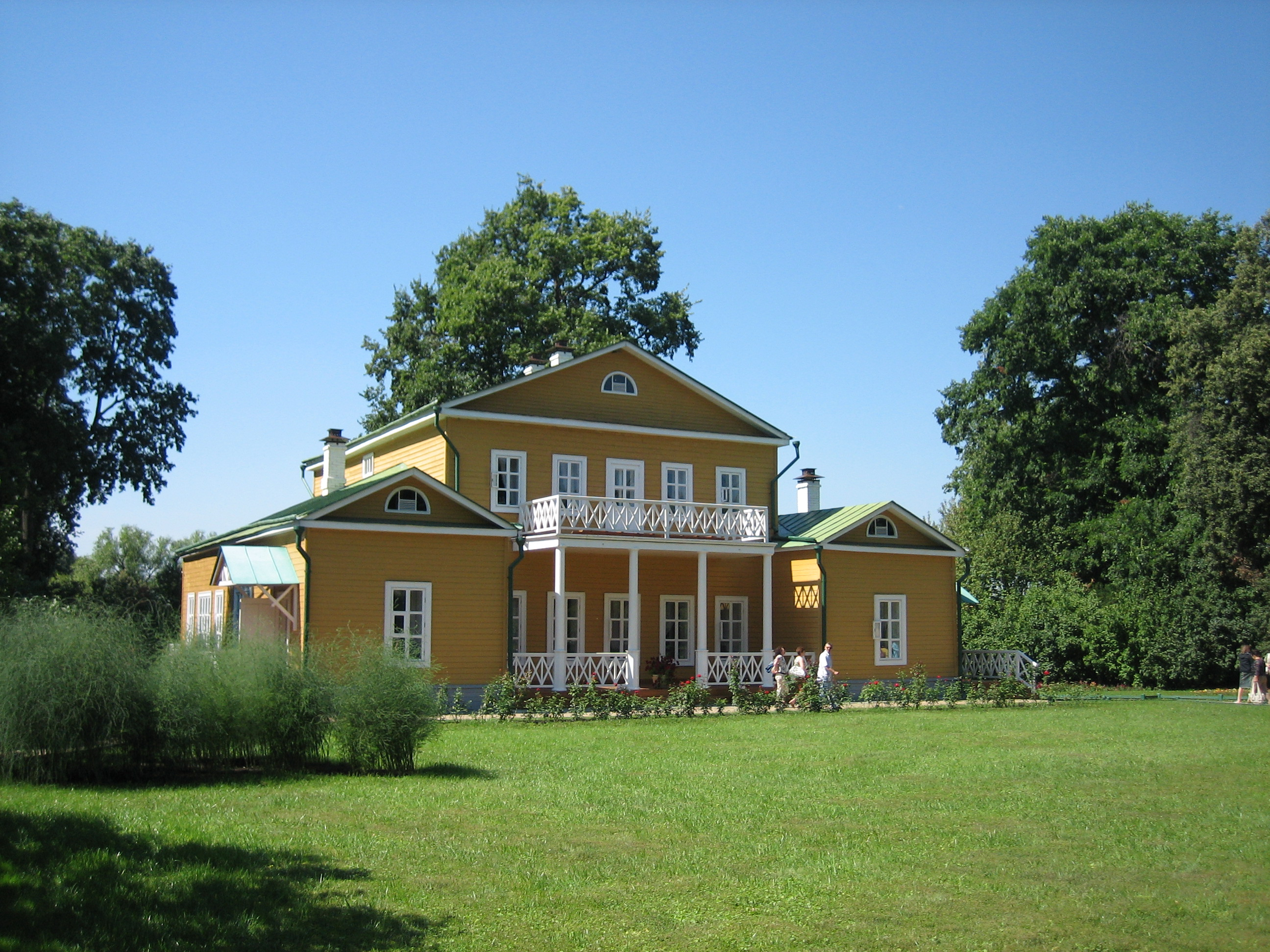
- Tarkhany, home of poet Mikhail Lermontov, Belinsky District

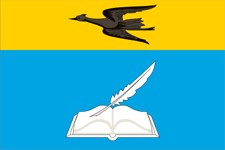
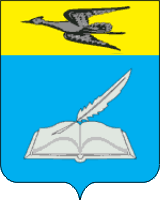
- Flag Coat of arms
- Location of Belinsky District in Penza Oblast
- Coordinates: 52°58′N 43°25′E
- Country: Russia
- Federal subject: Penza Oblast
- Established: 16 July 1928
- Administrative center: Belinsky

Area
  - Total: 2,124 km^{2} (820 sq mi)

Population (2010 Census)
  - Total: 28,881
  - Density: 13.60/km^{2} (35.22/sq mi)
  - Urban: 29.7%
  - Rural: 70.3%

Administrative structure
  - Administrative divisions: 1 Towns of district significance, 10 Selsoviets
  - Inhabited localities: 1 cities/towns, 88 rural localities

Municipal structure
  - Municipally incorporated as: Belinsky Municipal District
  - Municipal divisions: 1 urban settlements, 10 rural settlements
- Time zone: UTC+3 (MSK)
- OKTMO ID: 56612000
- Website: http://rbel.pnzreg.ru/

Belinsky District (Russian: Бели́нский райо́н) is an administrative and municipal district (raion), one of the twenty-seven in Penza Oblast, Russia. It is located in the west of the oblast. The area of the district is 2,124 square kilometers (820 sq mi). Its administrative center is the town of Belinsky. Population: 28,881 (2010 Census); 33,569 (2002 census); 38,997 (1989 Soviet census). The population of the administrative center accounts for 29.7% of the district's total population.
