= Mordovo, Tambov Oblast =

Mordovo Мордово
- Urban-type settlement
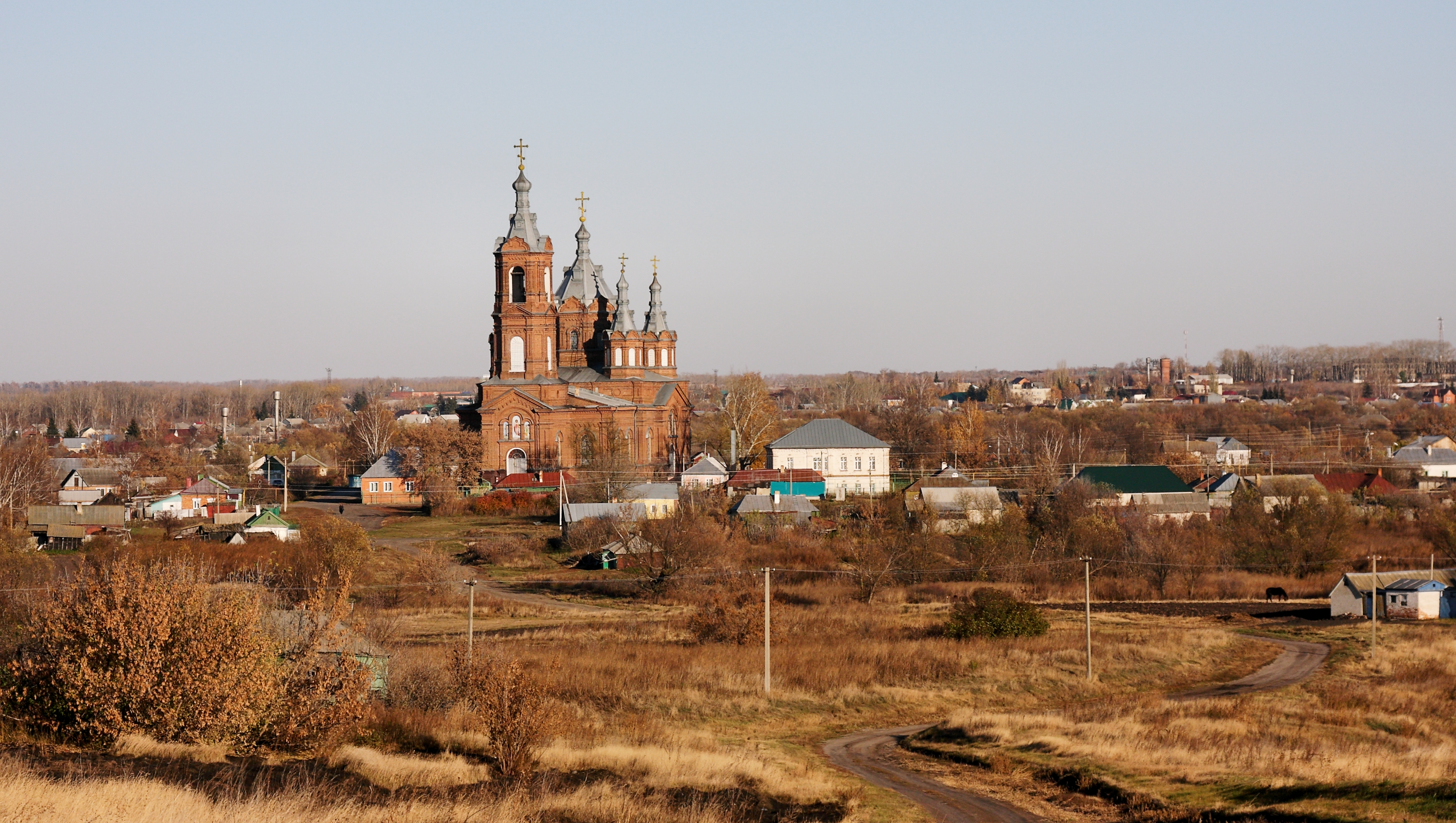
- St. Michael the Archangel Church in Mordovo
- Interactive map of Mordovo
- Location of Mordovo Mordovo (Tambov Oblast)
- Coordinates: 52.0886°N 40.7649°E
- Country: Russia
- Federal subject: Tambov Oblast
- Administrative district: Mordovsky District
- Founded: 1707
- Elevation: 151 m (495 ft)

Population (2010 Census)
  - Total: 6,520
  - Estimate (2021): 5,456 (−16.3%)
- Time zone: UTC+3 (MSK)
- Postal codes: 393600, 393601
- OKTMO ID: 68614151051

Mordovo (Russian: Мордово) is an urban locality (an urban-type settlement) in Mordovsky District of Tambov Oblast, Russia. Population: 6,520 (2010 census); 7,327 (2002 census); 8,445 (1989 Soviet census).
