= List of rural localities in Lipetsk Oblast =

Map of Russia with Lipetsk Oblast highlighted

This is a list of rural localities in Lipetsk Oblast. Lipetsk Oblast (Russian: Ли́пецкая о́бласть, Lipetskaya oblast) is a federal subject of Russia (an oblast). Its administrative center is the city of Lipetsk. As of the 2010 Census, its population was 1,173,513.

== Dankovsky District ==
Rural localities in Dankovsky District:

- Avdulovo
- Polibino

== Dobrinsky District ==
Rural localities in Dobrinsky District:

- Dobrinka

== Dobrovsky District ==
Rural localities in Dobrovsky District:

- Dobroye

== Dolgorukovsky District ==
Rural localities in Dolgorukovsky District:

- Dolgorukovo

== Gryazinsky District ==
Rural localities in Gryazinsky District:

- Kazinka

== Izmalkovsky District ==
Rural localities in Izmalkovsky District:

- Izmalkovo

== Khlevensky District ==
Rural localities in Khlevensky District:

- Khlevnoye

== Krasninsky District ==
Rural localities in Krasninsky District:

- Krasnoye

== Lev-Tolstovsky District ==
Rural localities in Lev-Tolstovsky District:

- Lev Tolstoy

== Lipetsky District ==
Rural localities in Lipetsky District:

- Lenino
- Pruzhinki

== Stanovlyansky District ==
Rural localities in Stanovlyansky District:

- Stanovoye

== Terbunsky District ==
Rural localities in Terbunsky District:

- Terbuny

== Volovsky District ==
Rural localities in Volovsky District:

- Volovo

== Yeletsky District ==
Rural localities in Yeletsky District:

- Kazaki

== Zadonsky District ==
Rural localities in Zadonsky District:

- Donskoy Selsoviet
- Donskoye

== See also ==
- Lists of rural localities in Russia
