= Lipetsk constituency =

Lipetsk single-member constituency
- Constituency of the Russian State Duma
- Deputy: Sergey Kurbatov; Independent
- Federal subject: Lipetsk Oblast
- Districts: Chaplyginsky, Dankovsky, Krasninsky, Lebedyansky, Lev-Tolstovsky, Lipetsk (Pravoberezhny, Sovetsky), Lipetsky, Yelets, Yeletsky
- Voters: 435,014 (2026)

The Lipetsk constituency (No.115 (Note: No.103 in 1993–1995 and 2003–2007, No.102 in 1995–2003, No.114 in 2016–2026)) is a Russian legislative constituency in Lipetsk Oblast. The constituency covers northern half of Lipetsk and northern Lipetsk Oblast.

The constituency has been represented since 2026 by New People faction member Sergey Kurbatov, former Deputy Governor of Lipetsk Oblast and banker, who won the open seat as an Independent, succeeding one-term United Russia incumbent Dmitry Averov.

== Boundaries ==
1993–2007: Gryazi, Gryazinsky District, Lipetsk, Lipetsky District
The constituency compactly covered the oblast capital Lipetsk, its satellite city Gryazi as well as their suburbs.

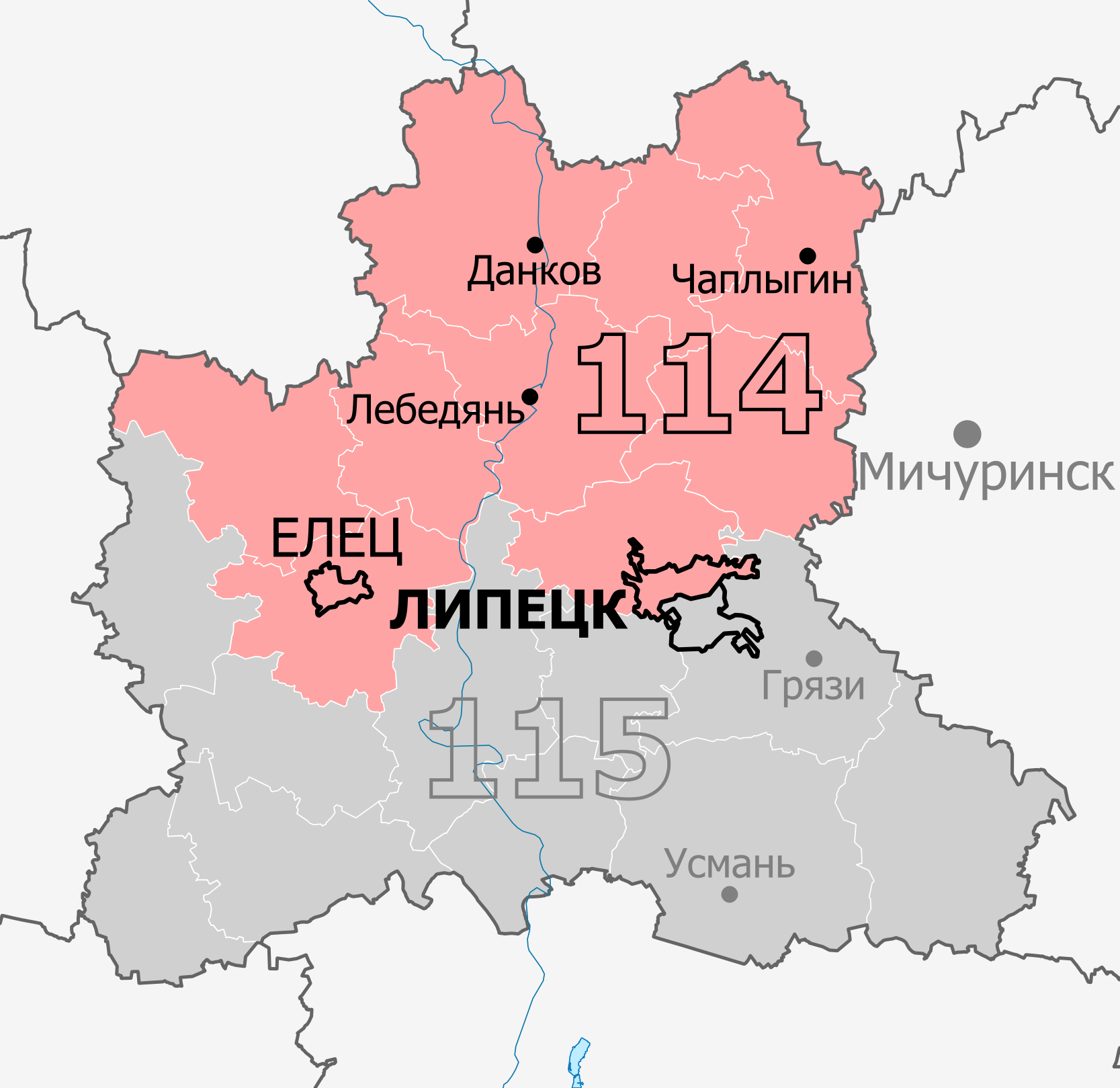
Constituency boundaries from 2016 to 2026

2016–2026: Chaplyginsky District, Dankovsky District, Dobrovsky District, Krasninsky District, Lebedyansky District, Lev-Tolstovsky District, Lipetsk (Pravoberezhny, Sovetsky), Lipetsky District (Bolshekuzminsky, Ivovsky, Kosyrevsky, Kuzmino-Otverzhsky, Lubnovsky, Novoderevensky, Novodmitriyevsky, Pruzhinsky, Sentsovsky, Telezhensky, Vvedensky), Stanovlyansky District, Yelets, Yeletsky District
The constituency was re-created for the 2016 election and retained only northern half of Lipetsk as well as northern Lipetsky District, losing the rest to new Levoberezhny constituency. This seat instead gained rural northern Lipetsk Oblast, including Yelets, from the former Yelets constituency.

2026–present: Chaplyginsky District, Dankovsky District, Krasninsky District, Lebedyansky District, Lev-Tolstovsky District, Lipetsk (Pravoberezhny, Sovetsky), Lipetsky District, Yelets, Yeletsky District
After the 2025 redistricting the constituency was significantly changed, swapping Dobrovsky and Stanovlyansky districts for the rest of Lipetsky District with Levoberezhny constituency.

== Members elected ==
Election	Member	Party
1993	Tamara Chepasova	Women of Russia
1995	Viktor Minakov	Communist Party
1999	Lev Yarkin	Independent
2003	Sergey Afendulov	Independent
2007	Proportional representation – no election by constituency	
2011	Proportional representation – no election by constituency	
2016	Nikolay Bortsov (Note: died in April 2023)	United Russia
2021	Nikolay Bortsov	United Russia
2023	Dmitry Averov	United Russia
2026	Sergey Kurbatov	Independent

== Election results ==
=== 1993 ===
Summary of the 12 December 1993 Russian legislative election in the Lipetsk constituency
Candidate	Party	Votes	%
Tamara Chepasova	Women of Russia	49,112	19.12%
Viktor Minakov	Independent	44,960	17.50%
Oleg Dyachkin	Independent	43,927	17.10%
Sergey Stepanov	Civic Union	29,588	11.52%
Vladimir Abakumov	Yavlinsky–Boldyrev–Lukin	12,629	4.92%
against all		52,516	20.44%
Total		256,883	100%

=== 1995 ===
Summary of the 17 December 1995 Russian legislative election in the Lipetsk constituency
Candidate	Party	Votes	%
Viktor Minakov	Communist Party	69,998	23.75%
Lyudmila Kurakova	Our Home – Russia	34,533	11.72%
Maria Sorokina	Derzhava	32,070	10.88%
Nikolay Puzikov	Liberal Democratic Party	23,420	7.95%
Tamara Chepasova (incumbent)	Ivan Rybkin Bloc	22,688	7.70%
Sergey Vasilyev	Yabloko	22,093	7.50%
Anatoly Kleymenov	Congress of Russian Communities	11,968	4.06%
Nikolay Ponomarev	Democratic Choice of Russia – United Democrats	10,699	3.63%
Aleksandr Biryukov	Forward, Russia!	10,181	3.45%
Viktor Arzhanykh	Independent	9,857	3.34%
Viktor Krysanov	Independent	8,271	2.81%
against all		30,358	10.30%
Total		294,719	100%

=== 1999 ===
Summary of the 19 December 1999 Russian legislative election in the Lipetsk constituency
Candidate	Party	Votes	%
Lev Yarkin	Independent	94,584	32.24%
Viktor Minakov (incumbent)	Communist Party	84,677	28.86%
Aleksandr Zaytsev	Union of Right Forces	25,765	8.78%
Anatoly Koltsov	Independent	19,863	6.77%
Anatoly Kleymenov	Congress of Russian Communities-Yury Boldyrev Movement	11,214	3.82%
Oleg Kravchenko	Our Home – Russia	9,648	3.29%
Sergey Grishin	Spiritual Heritage	2,952	1.01%
against all		38,669	13.18%
Total		293,361	100%

=== 2003 ===
Summary of the 7 December 2003 Russian legislative election in the Lipetsk constituency
Candidate	Party	Votes	%
Sergey Afendulov	Independent	70,699	29.49%
Viktor Minakov	Communist Party	33,739	14.07%
Igor Polosin	Party of Russia's Rebirth-Russian Party of Life	30,609	12.77%
Nikolay Biryukov	Independent	23,477	9.79%
Valentin Sviridov	Liberal Democratic Party	11,015	4.59%
Mikhail Kolchev	Rodina	9,489	3.96%
Gennady Kuptsov	Independent	4,933	2.06%
Sergey Kazarov	National Patriotic Forces of Russia	2,481	1.03%
against all		48,258	20.13%
Total		240,158	100%

=== 2016 ===
Summary of the 18 September 2016 Russian legislative election in the Lipetsk constituency
Candidate	Party	Votes	%
Nikolay Bortsov	United Russia	130,520	54.89%
Nikolay Razvorotnev	Communist Party	31,079	13.07%
Maksim Khalimonchuk	Liberal Democratic Party	18,895	7.95%
Svetlana Tyunina	A Just Russia	16,684	7.02%
Sergey Valetov	Rodina	13,415	5.64%
Vadim Trofimov	Communists of Russia	7,496	3.15%
Vadim Kovrigin	Yabloko	5,026	2.11%
Yelena Yerkina	Party of Growth	4,565	1.92%
Vladimir Fomichev	People's Freedom Party	1,985	0.83%
Total		237,770	100%

=== 2021 ===
Summary of the 17–19 September 2021 Russian legislative election in the Lipetsk constituency
Candidate	Party	Votes	%
Nikolay Bortsov (incumbent)	United Russia	114,865	48.15%
Nikolay Bykovskikh	Communist Party	47,552	19.93%
Aleksandr Fomin	A Just Russia — For Truth	15,269	6.40%
Anatoly Yemelyanov	Liberal Democratic Party	13,809	5.79%
Igor Basinskikh	New People	13,544	5.68%
Maksim Chuvashov	Communists of Russia	11,638	4.88%
Sergey Vasin	The Greens	6,573	2.76%
Zhanna Khairedinova	Rodina	2,509	1.23%
Total		238,579	100%

=== 2023 ===
Summary of the 8–10 September 2023 by-election in the Lipetsk constituency
Candidate	Party	Votes	%
Dmitry Averov	United Russia	106,525	58.78%
Sergey Tokarev	Communist Party	25,305	13.96%
Anatoly Yemelyanov	Liberal Democratic Party	17,553	9.69%
Larisa Ksenofontova	A Just Russia – For Truth	15,618	8.62%
Oleg Tokarev	Communists of Russia	11,783	6.50%
Total		181,222	100%

=== 2026 ===
Summary of the 18-20 September 2026 Russian legislative election in the Lipetsk constituency
Candidate	Party	Votes	%
Sergey Kurbatov	Independent	88,614	38.61%
Sergey Tokarev	Communist Party	40,125	17.48%
Sergey Volobuyev	Party of Pensioners	19,365	8.44%
Yevgeny Isayev	New People	17,607	7.67%
Vadim Yegorov	A Just Russia	16,775	7.31%
Marina Razdobarina	Liberal Democratic Party	15,044	6.55%
Anna Kubrina	Yabloko	11,283	4.92%
Polina Znamenshchikova	The Greens	6,110	2.66%
Valentina Khromovskaya	Communists of Russia	5,858	2.55%
Zhanna Khairedinova	Rodina	2,635	1.15%
Total		229,538	100%
