= Yelets constituency =

Russian legislative constituency

Yelets single-member constituency
- Constituency of the Russian State Duma

- Constituency boundaries from 1993 to 2007
- Deputy: None
- Federal subject: Lipetsk Oblast
- Districts: Chaplyginsky, Dankovsky, Dobrinsky, Dobrovsky, Dolgorukovsky, Izmalkovsky, Khlevensky, Krasninsky, Lebedyansky, Lev-Tolstovsky, Stanovlyansky, Terbunsky, Usmansky, Volovsky, Yelets, Yeletsky, Zadonsky
- Voters: 449,680 (2003)

The Yelets constituency (No.102 (Note: No.101 in 1995-2003)) was a Russian legislative constituency in Lipetsk Oblast in 1993–2007. It covered most of Lipetsk Oblast, except Lipetsk and its suburbs. The seat was last occupied by United Russia deputy Nikolay Bortsov, a wealthy agribusinessman, who won the open-seat election in the 2003 election.

The constituency was dissolved in 2007 when State Duma adopted full proportional representation for the next two electoral cycles. Yelets constituency was not re-established for the 2016 election, currently its territory is split with northern part (including Yelets) put into Lipetsk constituency, while southern part — into new Levoberezhny constituency

== Boundaries ==
1993–2007: Chaplyginsky District, Dankov, Dankovsky District, Dobrinsky District, Dobrovsky District, Dolgorukovsky District, Izmalkovsky District, Khlevensky District, Krasninsky District, Lebedyansky District, Lev-Tolstovsky District, Stanovlyansky District, Terbunsky District, Usmansky District, Volovsky District, Yelets, Yeletsky District, Zadonsky District
The constituency covered most of Lipetsk Oblast outside Lipetsk and its suburbs and included the towns of Dankov and Yelets.

== Members elected ==
Election	Member	Party
1993	Viktor Repkin	Independent
1995	Vladimir Toporkov (Note: died in June 2003)	Communist Party
1999	Vladimir Toporkov	Communist Party
2003	Nikolay Bortsov	United Russia

== Election results ==
=== 1993 ===
==== Declared candidates ====
- Nikolay Butko (Independent), chief of the South Eastern Railway Yelets division
- Valentin Dmitriyevsky (Civic Union), Deputy Head of the Gostekhnadzor Lipetsk Office, chairman of the People's Party "Free Russia" regional office, 1993 gubernatorial candidate
- Oleg Grishkevich (CPRF), former Member of Yelets City Council of People's Deputies (1990–1993), middle school principal
- Dmitry Pitertsev (Independent), chief of staff to the Presidential Envoy to Lipetsk Oblast
- Viktor Repkin (Independent), Head of the Lipetsk Oblast Department of Agriculture (1992–present)
- Boris Shestakov (Independent), chief doctor of the Yelets city children's dentist polyclinic
- Vadim Sidorovich (BR–NI), Chairman of the Yelets City Fund of Youth
- Maria Sorokina (Independent), former People's Deputy of Russia (1990–1993)
- Aleksandr Sutormin (Independent), journalist (previously ran as CPRF candidate)
- Vladimir Zausaylov (Independent), entrepreneur, ethnographer

==== Withdrawn candidates ====
- Yury Fabrichnykh (Choice of Russia), union leader
- Pavel Guchek (PRES), Deputy Governor of Lipetsk Oblast (1993–present)

==== Results ====
Summary of the 12 December 1993 Russian legislative election in the Yelets constituency
Candidate	Party	Votes	%
Viktor Repkin	Independent	52,080	17.65%
Maria Sorokina	Independent	48,938	16.58%
Boris Shestakov	Independent	23,671	8.02%
Oleg Grishkevich	Communist Party	20,731	7.03%
Vladimir Zausaylov	Independent	20,208	6.85%
Dmitry Pitertsev	Independent	19,431	6.59%
Aleksandr Sutormin	Independent	17,693	6.00%
Nikolay Butko	Independent	11,863	4.02%
Valentin Dmitriyevsky	Civic Union	9,793	3.32%
Vadim Sidorovich	Future of Russia–New Names	5,919	2.01%
against all		42,057	14.25%
Total		295,075	100%

=== 1995 ===
==== Declared candidates ====
- Pyotr Gorlov (BIR), former Head of the Lipetsk Oblast Department of Agriculture (1994–1995)
- Viktor Gorlov (Derzhava), former Second Secretary of the CPSU Yelets City Committee (1969–1979)
- Galina Ivannikova (NDR), kolkhoz chairwoman
- Abdulkhamid Mazhayev (For the Motherland!), businessman
- Viktor Repkin (APR), incumbent Member of State Duma (1994–present)
- Boris Shestakov (Independent), chief doctor of the Yelets city children's dentist polyclinic, 1993 candidate for this seat
- Vladimir Toporkov (CPRF), former People's Deputy of Russia (1990–1993), former First Secretary of the CPSU Lipetsk Oblast Committee (1991)
- Pavel Yevgrafov (Forward, Russia!), Member of Yelets City Council of Deputies, chairman of the party city office

==== Results ====
Summary of the 17 December 1995 Russian legislative election in the Yelets constituency
Candidate	Party	Votes	%
Vladimir Toporkov	Communist Party	113,991	36.74%
Viktor Repkin (incumbent)	Agrarian Party	39,309	12.67%
Galina Ivannikova	Our Home – Russia	36,465	11.75%
Boris Shestakov	Independent	27,933	9.00%
Viktor Gorlov	Derzhava	24,650	7.94%
Pyotr Gorlov	Ivan Rybkin Bloc	14,764	4.76%
Pavel Yevgrafov	Forward, Russia!	10,554	3.40%
Abdulkhamid Mazhayev	For the Motherland!	4,882	1.57%
against all		31,897	10.28%
Total		310,299	100%

=== 1999 ===
==== Declared candidates ====
- Aleksandr Chernyshov (NDR), chief doctor of the municipal medical institution
- Dmitry Dvugroshev (Independent), regional consumers union chairman
- Leonid Kovalyov (Nikolayev–Fyodorov Bloc), former Deputy Chief of the General Staff (1994–1995), retired Russian Army colonel general
- Ruslan Krupoderov (DN), director of the Modern University for the Humanities Yelets branch
- Nikolay Malygin (Independent), Moscow youth wresting federation president
- Aleksandr Orishev (LDPR), aide to State Duma member
- Maria Sorokina (Independent), former People's Deputy of Russia (1990–1993), 1993 candidate for this seat
- Vladimir Toporkov (CPRF), incumbent Member of State Duma (1996–present)
- Boris Uvarov (ROS), special investigator of the Prosecutor's Office of Russia
- Anatoly Yakovlev (Independent), businessman
- Aleksandr Yeletskikh (SPS), journalist

==== Failed to qualify ====
- Yury Dobrin (Independent), entrepreneur
- Oleg Grishkevich (Independent), Member of State Duma (1996–present), 1993 candidate for this seat
- Sergey Kucherov (Stalin Bloc), transportation executive
- Yury Shaleyev (Independent)
- Boris Shestakov (RSP), chief doctor of the Yelets city children's dentist polyclinic, 1993 and 1995 candidate for this seat

==== Did not file ====
- Aleksandr Boldyrev (Independent)
- Nikolay Telegin (Independent)
- Pavel Yegorov (Independent)

==== Results ====
Summary of the 19 December 1999 Russian legislative election in the Yelets constituency
Candidate	Party	Votes	%
Vladimir Toporkov (incumbent)	Communist Party	94,923	34.04%
Dmitry Dvugroshev	Independent	51,121	18.33%
Leonid Kovalyov	Andrey Nikolayev and Svyatoslav Fyodorov Bloc	18,609	6.67%
Maria Sorokina	Independent	18,119	6.50%
Aleksandr Yeletskikh	Union of Right Forces	17,483	6.27%
Aleksandr Orishev	Liberal Democratic Party	9,198	3.30%
Anatoly Yakovlev	Independent	8,496	3.05%
Boris Uvarov	Russian All-People's Union	7,177	2.57%
Nikolay Malygin	Independent	5,895	2.11%
Aleksandr Chernyshov	Our Home – Russia	3,577	1.28%
Ruslan Krupoderov	Spiritual Heritage	3,199	1.15%
against all		34,623	12.42%
Total		278,826	100%

=== 2003 ===
==== Declared candidates ====
- Andrey Boldin (APR), deputy director of the Russian Research Centre of Radiology
- Nikolay Bortsov (United Russia), Member of Lipetsk Oblast Council of Deputies (2002–present), agriculture businessman
- Valery Dunayev (LDPR), individual entrepreneur
- Yury Golik (Independent), former People's Deputy of the Soviet Union (1989–1991)
- Nikolay Razvorotnev (CPRF), director of the Lipetsk metallurgical vocational college
- Sergey Tyurenkov (Independent), unemployed
- Aleksandr Yeletskikh (SPS), journalist, 1999 candidate for this seat

==== Withdrawn candidates ====
- Natalya Borodavkina (ORP Rus'), educator

==== Results ====
Summary of the 7 December 2003 Russian legislative election in the Yelets constituency
Candidate	Party	Votes	%
Nikolay Bortsov	United Russia	106,136	42.34%
Andrey Boldin	Agrarian Party	48,515	19.35%
Nikolay Razvorotnev	Communist Party	33,605	13.40%
Aleksandr Yeletskikh	Union of Right Forces	9,672	3.86%
Valery Dunayev	Liberal Democratic Party	7,919	3.16%
Yury Golik	Independent	6,721	2.68%
Sergey Tyurenkov	Independent	1,652	0.66%
against all		28,275	11.28%
Total		250,800	100%
