= Levoberezhny constituency =

Levoberezhny single-member constituency
- Constituency of the Russian State Duma
- Deputy: Tatyana Dyakonova; United Russia
- Federal subject: Lipetsk Oblast
- Districts: Dobrinsky, Dobrovsky, Dolgorukovsky, Gryazinsky, Izmalkovsky, Khlevensky, Lipetsk (Levoberezhny, Oktyabrsky), Stanovlyansky, Terbunsky, Usmansky, Volovsky, Zadonsky
- Voters: 433,359 (2026)

The Levoberezhny constituency (No.116 (Note: No.115 in 2016–2026)) is a Russian legislative constituency in Lipetsk Oblast. The constituency covers southern half of Lipetsk and southern Lipetsk Oblast.

The constituency has been represented since 2026 by United Russia deputy Tatyana Dyakonova, two-term State Duma member and Ministry of Economic Development of Russia official, who won the open seat left vacant following the death of four-term United Russia deputy Mikhail Tarasenko in July 2025.

== Boundaries ==
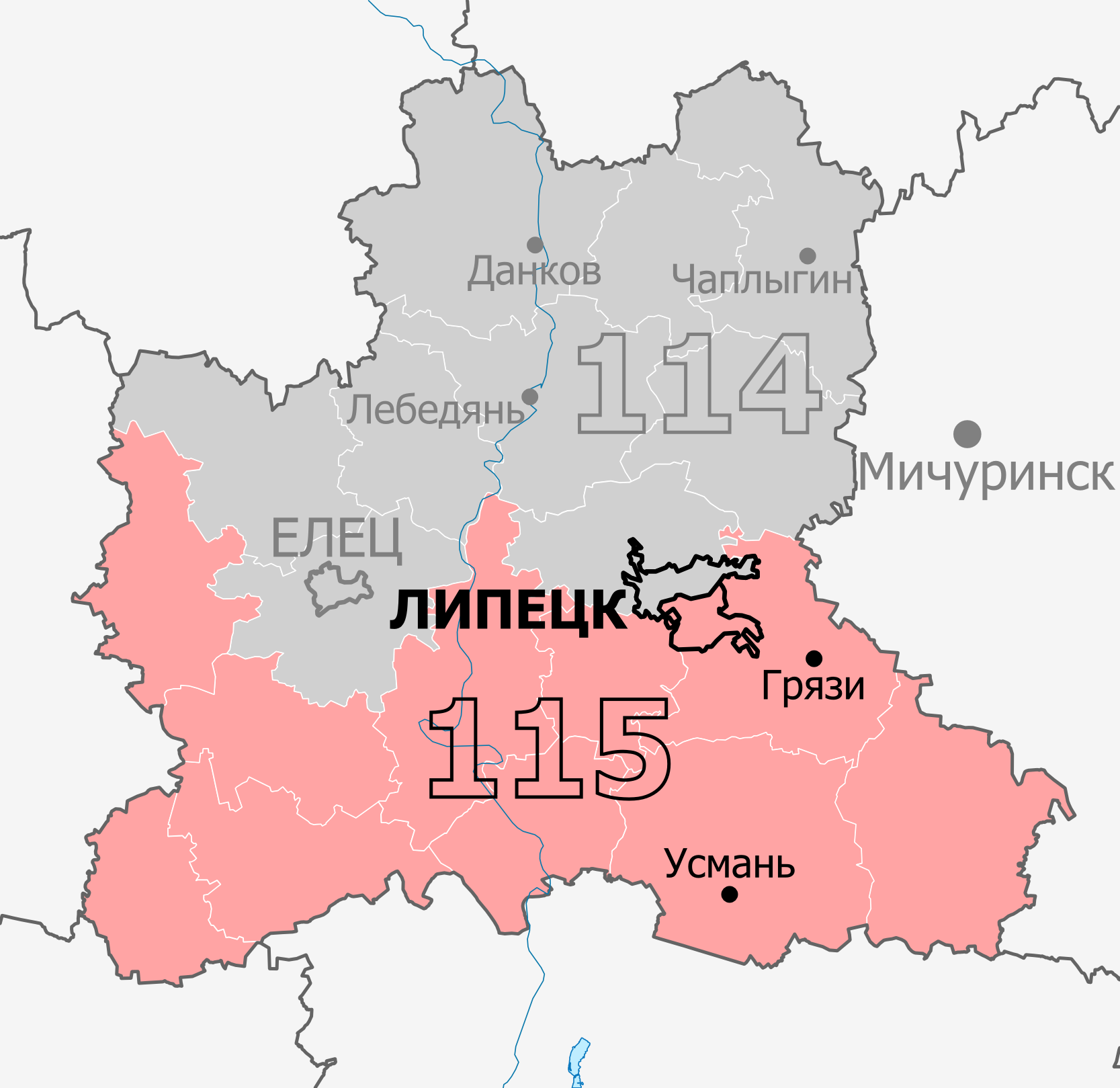
Constituency boundaries from 2016 to 2026

2016–2026: Dobrinsky District, Dolgorukovsky District, Gryazinsky District, Izmalkovsky District, Khlevensky District, Lipetsk (Levoberezhny, Oktyabrsky), Lipetsky District (Borinsky, Chastodubravsky, Gryaznovsky, Kruto-Khutorsky, Leninsky, Padovsky, Stebayevsky, Syrsky, Vasilyevsky, Verbilovsky), Terbunsky District, Usmansky District, Volovsky District, Zadonsky District
The constituency was created for the 2016 election from southern half of Lipetsk and Gryazi (formerly part of Lipetsk constituency) as well as rural southern Lipetsk Oblast (formerly part of Yelets constituency).

2026–present: Dobrinsky District, Dobrovsky District, Dolgorukovsky District, Gryazinsky District, Izmalkovsky District, Khlevensky District, Lipetsk (Levoberezhny, Oktyabrsky), Stanovlyansky District, Terbunsky District, Usmansky District, Volovsky District, Zadonsky District
After the 2025 redistricting the constituency was significantly changed, swapping its part of Lipetsky District for Dobrovsky and Stanovlyansky districts with Lipetsk constituency.

== Members elected ==
Election	Member	Party
2016	Mikhail Tarasenko (Note: died in July 2025)	United Russia
2021	Mikhail Tarasenko	United Russia
2026	Tatyana Dyakonova	United Russia

== Election results ==
=== 2016 ===
Summary of the 18 September 2016 Russian legislative election in the Levoberezhny constituency
Candidate	Party	Votes	%
Mikhail Tarasenko	United Russia	154,786	60.10%
Sergey Tokarev	Communist Party	34,283	13.31%
Larisa Ksenofontova	A Just Russia	26,330	10.22%
Oleg Khomutinnikov	Liberal Democratic Party	21,062	8.18%
Aleksandr Trofimov	Communists of Russia	7,665	2.98%
Yevgeny Rozhnov	Yabloko	6,347	2.46%
Total		257,549	100%

=== 2021 ===
Summary of the 17-19 September 2021 Russian legislative election in the Levoberezhny constituency
Candidate	Party	Votes	%
Mikhail Tarasenko (incumbent)	United Russia	114,494	48.07%
Sergey Tokarev	Communist Party	38,708	16.25%
Larisa Ksenofontova	A Just Russia — For Truth	15,390	6.46%
Vitaly Bodrov	Communists of Russia	14,820	6.22%
Oleg Tokarev	Party of Pensioners	13,060	5.48%
Maksim Zachinyayev	Liberal Democratic Party	12,023	5.05%
Andrey Kocherov	New People	10,307	4.33%
Sergey Zvyagin	Rodina	5,443	2.29%
Yelena Vasina	The Greens	5,062	2.13%
Aleksandr Shkurko	Party of Growth	2,021	0.85%
Total		238,173	100%

=== 2026 ===
Summary of the 18-20 September 2026 Russian legislative election in the Levoberezhny constituency
Candidate	Party	Votes	%
Tatyana Dyakonova	United Russia	110,831	46.89%
Nikolay Bykovskikh	Communist Party	36,582	15.48%
Maksim Zachinyayev	Liberal Democratic Party	19,432	8.22%
Denis Grishayev	New People	14,491	6.13%
Larisa Ksenofontova	A Just Russia	13,006	5.50%
Natalya Shchedrina	Party of Pensioners	12,359	5.23%
Aleksandr Naumov	Yabloko	8,280	3.50%
Yury Loginov	Communists of Russia	8,207	3.47%
Sergey Zvyagin	Rodina	4,793	2.03%
Sergey Sokolov	The Greens	3,749	1.59%
Total		236,368	100%
