= Krasny Luch =

Krasny Luch (Russian: Красный Луч) is the name of several inhabited localities in Russia.

== Urban localities ==
- Krasny Luch, Pskov Oblast, a work settlement in Bezhanitsky District of Pskov Oblast

== Rural localities ==
- Krasny Luch, Amur Oblast, a selo in Innokentyevsky Rural Settlement of Arkharinsky District of Amur Oblast
- Krasny Luch, Bryansk Oblast, a settlement in Rozhnovsky Selsoviet of Klintsovsky District of Bryansk Oblast
- Krasny Luch, Leningrad Oblast, a logging depot settlement in Kurskoye Settlement Municipal Formation of Volosovsky District of Leningrad Oblast
- Krasny Luch, Dankovsky District, Lipetsk Oblast, a settlement in Perekhvalsky Selsoviet of Dankovsky District of Lipetsk Oblast
- Krasny Luch, Dolgorukovsky District, Lipetsk Oblast, a village in Menshekolodezsky Selsoviet of Dolgorukovsky District of Lipetsk Oblast
- Krasny Luch, Gryazinsky District, Lipetsk Oblast, a settlement in Soshkinsky Selsoviet of Gryazinsky District of Lipetsk Oblast
- Krasny Luch, Volovsky District, Lipetsk Oblast, a settlement in Zamaraysky Selsoviet of Volovsky District of Lipetsk Oblast
- Krasny Luch, Nizhny Novgorod Oblast, a settlement in Shudsky Selsoviet of Varnavinsky District of Nizhny Novgorod Oblast
- Krasny Luch, Novgorod Oblast, a village in Slavitinskoye Settlement of Volotovsky District of Novgorod Oblast
- Krasny Luch, Oryol Oblast, a settlement in Mokhovskoy Selsoviet of Pokrovsky District of Oryol Oblast
- Krasny Luch, Rostov Oblast, a khutor in Krasnoluchskoye Rural Settlement of Oktyabrsky District of Rostov Oblast
- Krasny Luch, Ryazan Oblast, a settlement under the administrative jurisdiction of the work settlement of Lesnoy in Shilovsky District of Ryazan Oblast
- Krasny Luch, Vladimir Oblast, a village in Petushinsky District of Vladimir Oblast
