= Administrative divisions of Lipetsk Oblast =

Administrative districts of Russian federal subject

Lipetsk Oblast Russia
- Administrative center: Lipetsk

Administrative structure (as of 2015)
- Districts: 18
- Cities/towns: 8
- Urban-type settlements: 0
- Selsovets: 301

Municipal structure (as of 2002)
- Rural settlements: 1,587 (inhabited); 47 (uninhabited)

Lipetsk Oblast is a federal subject of Russia.

== Administrative and municipal divisions ==
- Cities and towns under the oblast's jurisdiction:
  - Lipetsk (Липецк) (administrative center)
    - city territorial okrugs:
      - Levoberezhny (Левобережный)
      - Oktyabrsky (Октябрьский)
      - Pravoberezhny (Правобережный)
      - Sovetsky (Советский)
  - Yelets (Елец)
- Districts:
  - Chaplyginsky (Чаплыгинский)
    - Towns under the district's jurisdiction:
      - Chaplygin (Чаплыгин)
    - with 22 selsovets under the district's jurisdiction.
  - Dankovsky (Данковский)
    - Towns under the district's jurisdiction:
      - Dankov (Данков)
    - with 22 selsovets under the district's jurisdiction.
  - Dobrinsky (Добринский)
    - with 19 selsovets under the district's jurisdiction.
  - Dobrovsky (Добровский)
    - with 17 selsovets under the district's jurisdiction.
  - Dolgorukovsky (Долгоруковский)
    - with 14 selsovets under the district's jurisdiction.
  - Gryazinsky (Грязинский)
    - Towns under the district's jurisdiction:
      - Gryazi (Грязи)
    - with 16 selsovets under the district's jurisdiction.
  - Izmalkovsky (Измалковский)
    - with 13 selsovets under the district's jurisdiction.
  - Khlevensky (Хлевенский)
    - with 15 selsovets under the district's jurisdiction.
  - Krasninsky (Краснинский)
    - with 10 selsovets under the district's jurisdiction.
  - Lebedyansky (Лебедянский)
    - Towns under the district's jurisdiction:
      - Lebedyan (Лебедянь)
    - with 16 selsovets under the district's jurisdiction.
  - Lev-Tolstovsky (Лев-Толстовский)
    - with 12 selsovets under the district's jurisdiction.
  - Lipetsky (Липецкий)
    - with 21 selsovets under the district's jurisdiction.
  - Stanovlyansky (Становлянский)
    - with 18 selsovets under the district's jurisdiction.
  - Terbunsky (Тербунский)
    - with 15 selsovets under the district's jurisdiction.
  - Usmansky (Усманский)
    - Towns under the district's jurisdiction:
      - Usman (Усмань)
    - with 24 selsovets under the district's jurisdiction.
  - Volovsky (Воловский)
    - with 15 selsovets under the district's jurisdiction.
  - Yeletsky (Елецкий)
    - with 15 selsovets under the district's jurisdiction.
  - Zadonsky (Задонский)
    - Towns under the district's jurisdiction:
      - Zadonsk (Задонск)
    - with 17 selsovets under the district's jurisdiction.
