= Nikolay Bortsov =

Russian politician (1945–2023)

- Николай Борцов
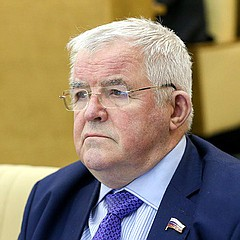
- Official Duma photograph, 2018

Member of the State Duma for Lipetsk Oblast
- In office 5 October 2016 – 23 April 2023
- Preceded by: constituency re-established
- Succeeded by: Dmitry Averov
- Constituency: Lipetsk (No. 114)
- In office 29 December 2003 – 24 December 2007
- Preceded by: Vladimir Toporkov
- Succeeded by: constituency abolished
- Constituency: Yelets (No. 102)

Member of the State Duma (Party List Seat)
- In office 24 December 2007 – 5 October 2016

Personal details
- Born: 8 May 1945 Lebedyan, Ryazan Oblast (now – Lipetsk Oblast), Russian SFSR, USSR
- Died: 23 April 2023 (aged 77) Lebedyan, Russia
- Party: United Russia
- Spouse: Nina Bortsova
- Children: Yuri Bortsov, Natalia Bortsova
- Education: All-Russian Distance Institute of Finance and Economic

Nikolay Ivanovich Bortsov (Russian: Николай Иванович Борцов; 8 May 1945 – 23 April 2023) was a Russian politician who served as a deputy of the 4th, 5th, 6th, 7th, and 8th State Dumas convocations.

== Biography ==
Bortsov was raised by his mother and grandmother as his father died at the front. After the 8th grade of secondary school, he started working as a loader at a pasta factory, simultaneously studying at an evening school.

In 1969 he graduated from the Michurinsk Technological College, in 1980 he received a second degree at the All-Russian Correspondence Institute of Finance and Economics.

After serving in the army, he got a job as a mechanic at a winery in Lebedyan.

Bortsov died on 23 April 2023, at the age of 77.

== Career ==
In 1981, he was appointed Director of the Cannery Lebedyansky. In 1992, together with his son Yuri, they acquired a controlling interest in Lebedyansky. By 2003, the factory ranked third in Russia in juice production. In 2008, Lebedyansky was sold to PepsiCo and The Pepsi Bottling Group.

In 2004, together with his son, he founded a charitable foundation that shares their second name. The fund specializes in the restoration of the Russian Orthodox Church temples, also assists war veterans and allocates funds to support science and education.

From 2003, Nikolay Bortsov was a deputy of the State Duma, running with the United Russia in 4th State Duma. In 2007 he was elected to the 5th State Duma. In 2011 he was elected to the 6th State Duma. In 2016 he was elected to the 7th State Duma. Since September 2021, he had served as a deputy of the 8th State Duma.

== Wealth ==
In 2021, Forbes included Bortsov in the list of the two hundred wealthiest businessmen in Russia.

== Sanctions ==
On 23 February 2022, against the backdrop of Russia's invasion of Ukraine, he was included in the EU sanctions list, as he "supported and pursued actions and policies that undermine the territorial integrity, sovereignty and independence of Ukraine, which further destabilize Ukraine".

On 24 March 2022, he was included in the US sanctions list alongside many members of the Duma for "supporting the Kremlin's efforts to violate the sovereignty and territorial integrity of Ukraine" and "complicity in Putin's war".

Later, for similar reasons, he was included in the sanctions lists of Canada, Switzerland, Australia, Japan, Ukraine and New Zealand.

Bortsov was also sanctioned by the United Kingdom Government in 2022 in relation to the Russo-Ukrainian War.

== Awards and honours ==
- Order of the Badge of Honour (1986)
- Order of Lenin (1991)
- Order of Honour (2003)
- Order of Friendship (2020)
- Gratitude from the Government of the Russian Federation (2019)
- The first honorary citizen of Lebedyan (2007)
- Honorary citizen of Lebedyansky District (2013)
- Badge of distinction "For services to the city of Lipetsk"

== See also ==
- List of members of the State Duma of Russia who died in office
