= Yeletsky =

Yeletsky (masculine), Yeletskaya (feminine), or Yeletskoye (neuter) may refer to:

- Yeletsky District, a district of Lipetsk Oblast, Russia
- Yeletsky (inhabited locality) (Yeletskaya, Yeletskoye), name of several inhabited localities in Russia
- Yeletsky (family), a princely family of Rurikid stock
