= Gryazi (inhabited locality) =

Gryazi (Russian: Грязи) is the name of several inhabited localities in Russia. The main town is located about 600 km south of Moscow and has a population of around 13,000 people. The town is situated on the banks of the Gryazi River and is known for its industrial and agricultural production. The major industries in Gryazi include food processing and machine building. The town also has a number of schools, hospitals and cultural institutions.

== Urban localities ==
- Gryazi, a town in Gryazinsky District of Lipetsk Oblast; administratively incorporated as a town under district jurisdiction.

== Rural localities ==
- Gryazi, Moscow Oblast, a village in Borodinskoye Rural Settlement of Mozhaysky District of Moscow Oblast
- Gryazi, Pskov Oblast, a village in Loknyansky District of Pskov Oblast
