= Lebedyansky =

Lebedyansky (masculine), Lebedyanskaya (feminine), or Lebedyanskoye (neuter) may refer to:

- Lebedyansky District, a district of Lipetsk Oblast, Russia
- Lebedyansky (company), a Russian multi-national company owned by PepsiCo
