= Kazinka =

Kazinka may refer to:

- Kazinka, Gryazinsky District, Lipetsk Oblast, a village (selo) in Gryazinsky District of Lipetsk Oblast, Russia
- Kazinka, Zadonsky District, Lipetsk Oblast, a village in Zadonsky District of Lipetsk Oblast, Russia
- Kazinka, Pskov Oblast, a village in Pskov Oblast, Russia
- Kazinka, name of several other rural localities in Russia
