= Dmitry Averov =

Russian politician (born 1974)

- Дмитрий Аверов
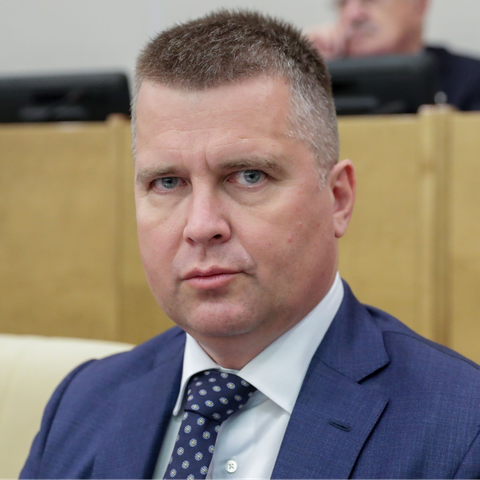

Member of the State Duma for Lipetsk Oblast
- Incumbent
- Assumed office September 2023
- Preceded by: Nikolay Bortsov
- Constituency: Lipetsk (No. 114)

Chairman of the Lipetsk Regional Council of Deputies
- In office 19 September 2021 – September 2023
- Preceded by: Pavel Putilin

Member of the Federation Council - representative from the executive authority of the Lipetsk Oblast
- In office 30 June 2021 – 19 September 2021
- Preceded by: Oleg Korolyov
- Succeeded by: Oksana Khlyakina

Deputy Head of Liptesk Oblast
- In office October 2018 – 30 June 2021

Deputy Head of Liptesk
- In office November 2016 – July 2017

Member of the Lipetsk City Council of Deputies
- In office 13 September 2015 – November 2016

Personal details
- Born: 3 June 1974 (age 52) Voronezh, RSFSR, USSR
- Party: United Russia
- Education: Voronezh State Technical University; Russian State University of Trade and Economics; Moscow International Higher Business School

Dmitry Lvovich Averov (Russian: Дмитрий Львович Аверов; born on 3 June 1974), is a Russian statesman and politician, who is currently a member of the State Duma, elected in September 2023. He was formerly a chairman of the Lipetsk Regional Council of Deputies serving from 2021 to 2023. Averov had also served as a Member of the Federation Council as a representative from the executive authority of the Lipetsk Oblast in 2021.

== Early life and education ==
Dmitry Averov was born on 3 June 1974 in Voronezh.

In 2002, he graduated from Voronezh State Technical University, engineer with a degree in Mechanical Engineering Technology.

In 2006, he graduated from the Russian State University of Trade and Economics, economist-manager with a degree in Economics and Enterprise Management.

In 2012, he graduated from the Moscow International Higher Business School MIRBIS.

== Career ==
On 13 September 2015, Averov was elected as a deputy of the Lipetsk City Council of Deputies of the V convocation from the United Russia party, receiving 43.52% of the votes.

In November 2016, he was appointed deputy, and in July 2017, first deputy head of Lipetsk by Sergey Ivanov. He coordinated the work in the areas of economics, consumer market and finance, procurement activities, public transport, road management and improvement, administrative and technical control departments and territorial districts. From October 2018 to June 2021, he was the Deputy Head of the Administration of the Lipetsk Oblast under Igor Artamonov. He oversaw issues of economics, foreign economic and investment activities.

== Federation Council ==
On 30 June 2021, Governor Artamonov vested Averov with the powers of a member of the Federation Council from the executive body of the region. Averov replaced Oleg Korolyov in this post. On 19 September 2021, he was relieved of his position in connection with his election to the post of Chairman of the Lipetsk Regional Council of Deputies.

== State Duma ==
In September 2023, Averov was elected a member of parliament of the State Duma.

== Personal life ==
He is married.
