= Lipetsky =

Lipetsky (masculine), Lipetskaya (feminine), or Lipetskoye (neuter) may refer to:

- Lipetsky District, a district of Lipetsk Oblast, Russia
- Lipetsk Oblast (Lipetskaya oblast), a federal subject of Russia
