= Tonus =

Tonus is the Latin equivalent of the English word tone, and may refer to:

- Muscle tone, the continuous and passive partial contraction of the muscles
- Arterial tone, the continuous and passive partial contraction of the arterioles
- Tonicity, the ability of a solution to cause water movement
- The Pythagorean interval of 9/8
- A brand of fruit juice produced by the Lebedyansky division of PepsiCo in Russia
