= Yeletsky (inhabited locality) =

Yeletsky (Russian: Елецкий; masculine), Yeletskaya (Елецкая; feminine), or Yeletskoye (Елецкое; neuter) is the name of several inhabited localities in Russia.

Urban localities

- Yeletsky, Komi Republic, an urban-type settlement under the administrative jurisdiction of the town of republic significance of Vorkuta, Komi Republic

Rural localities

- Yeletsky, Lipetsk Oblast, a settlement in Yeletsky Selsoviet of Yeletsky District of Lipetsk Oblast
- Yeletskoye, Belgorod Oblast, a selo in Novooskolsky District of Belgorod Oblast
- Yeletskoye, Lipetsk Oblast, a selo in Leninsky Selsoviet of Lipetsky District of Lipetsk Oblast
