= Donskoy Selsoviet =

Rural locality in Zadonsky District, Lipetsk Oblast, Russia

Coordinates: 52.63°N 38.98°E

Donskoy Selsoviet is a rural settlement in Zadonsky District of Lipetsk Region, Russia. It is located in the central part of Lipetsk Region and in the northern part of Zadonsky District. The area of the settlement is 150.11 square kilometers (58 sq mi). Its administrative center is Donskoye. Population: 5,055 (2014); 5,002 (2010 Census).

Locality	Type	Population (2010 Census)
Donskoye	village	3,807
Donskoy Rudnik	settlement	418
Don	railway station	241
Lukoshkinsky	settlement	173
Patriarshaya	railway station	145
Galichya Gora	village	105
Matyushkino	village	48
Annenka	village	38
Novoselje	village	27
