= Mikhail Tarasenko =

Russian politician (1947–2025)

- Михаил Тарасенко
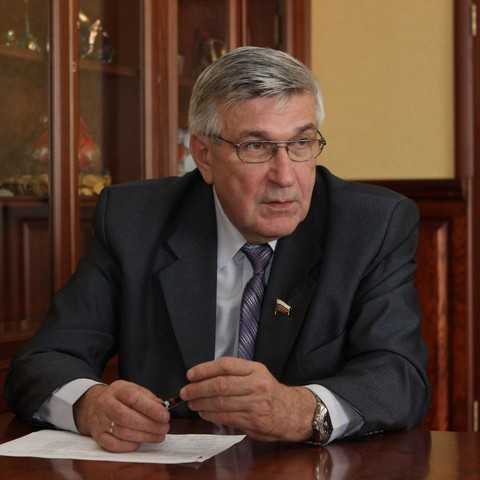
- Tarasenko in 2019

Member of the State Duma for Lipetsk Oblast
- In office 5 October 2016 – 22 July 2025
- Preceded by: constituency established
- Constituency: Levoberezhny (No. 115)

Member of the State Duma (Party List Seat)
- In office 24 December 2007 – 5 October 2016

Personal details
- Born: 21 November 1947 Taganrog, Rostov Oblast, Russian SFSR, USSR
- Died: 22 July 2025 (aged 77)
- Party: United Russia
- Spouse: Valentina Ivanovna
- Education: All-Union Distance Polytechnic Institute; Academy of Social Science

Mikhail Vasilievich Tarasenko (Russian: Михаил Васильевич Тарасенко; 21 November 1947 – 22 July 2025) was a Russian political figure and a deputy of the 8th State Duma.

== Career ==
After serving in the army, in 1968, Tarasenko started working at the Taganrog Iron & Steel Factory. In 1982, he was appointed the head of the Labor Protection Department of the Central Council of Russia's Mining and Metallurgical Trade Union. From 1996 to 2012, he was the head of Russia's Miners' & Metallurgical Workers' Union. In 2007, 2011, 2016, and 2021, he was elected deputy of the 5th, 6th, 7th, and 8th State Dumas, respectively.

== Sanctions ==
Tarasenko was sanctioned by the British government in 2022 in relation to the Russo-Ukrainian War.

== Death ==
Tarasenko died after a long illness on 22 July 2025, at the age of 77. Despite this, he was recorded in the State Duma as having voted on parliamentary motions 11 times during a legislative session that same day, shortly before his death was announced by the Duma's speaker, Vyacheslav Volodin.

== Awards ==
- Order "For Merit to the Fatherland" II degree (2 March 2018)
- Stolypin Medal (16 December 2019)
