= Tamara Chepasova =

Russian politician

Member of the State Duma
- In office 1993–1995
- Constituency: Lipetsk constituency

Personal details
- Born: 1 January 1950 (age 76)
- Party: Women of Russia
- Education: Penza Polytechnic Institute; Moscow Finance Institute; Academy of National Economy
- Occupation: Politician; economist; technologist

Tamara Eduardovna Chepasova (Russian: Тамара Эдуардовна Чепасова; née Zaytseva; born 1 January 1950) is a Russian politician who was deputy of the State Duma from 1993 until 1995. Prior to her election, she worked as a technologist and economist, serving as chief economist and chief technologist at the Aggregate Plant in Chaplygin, Lipetsk Oblast (1976–1986) and as chair of the Lipetsk Department of the State Committee on Antimonopoly Policy and Support for New Economic Structures (1991–1993). In 2012, she was elected to the Mitino District Duma.

== Biography ==
Tamara Eduardovna Chepasova was born on 1 January 1950 in Kochenyayevka, a village in Veshkaymsky District, Ulyanovsk Oblast. Her father Eduard Vasilyevich Zaytsev was a boarding school director in Chaplygin, Lipetsk Oblast. Her mother Klavdiya Mikhaylovna Zaytseva (née Makeyeva; 1923–2010) was a Soviet Army soldier who participated in the Battle of Stalingrad and was awarded the Medal "For the Capture of Budapest". She was educated at Penza Polytechnic Institute (graduating in 1972), the Moscow Finance Institute (graduating in 1986), and the Academy of National Economy (graduating in 1994).

Initially, Chepasova had a career as a technologist and in mechanical engineering plants, working at the Instrument-Making Plant in Vyborg (1972–1974), the Research Institute of Measuring Technology (1975–1976), and the Aggregate Plant in Chaplygin, where he was chief economist and chief technologist from 1976 until 1986. She later moved into politics, and she was chair of the Lipetsk Department of the State Committee on Antimonopoly Policy and Support for New Economic Structures from 1991 until 1993.

Chepasova was elected for the Women of Russia political bloc to the Lipetsk constituency in the 1993 Russian legislative election with 21.1% of the vote. She did not return to the constitutency for the 1995 election, and she was not elected to the 2nd State Duma. In 2012, she was elected to the Mitino District Duma for the No. 4 constituency.

As of 1994, Chepasova lived in Lipetsk, was married, and had two children. She also has two younger sisters.
