= Pruzhinki =

Rural locality in Lipetsky District, Lipetsk Oblast, Russia

Coordinates: 52°43′30″N 39°11′10″E

Pruzhinki (Russian: Пружинки) is a village (selo) in Lipetsky District of Lipetsk Oblast, Russia.

It was founded in the 17th century by service class people. In 1764, there were 100 farms in Pruzhinki. In 1803, the church of John the Theologian, which is now a monument of regional importance, was built.
