= Olga Belyavtseva =

Russian businesswoman

Olga Alekseevna Belyavtseva
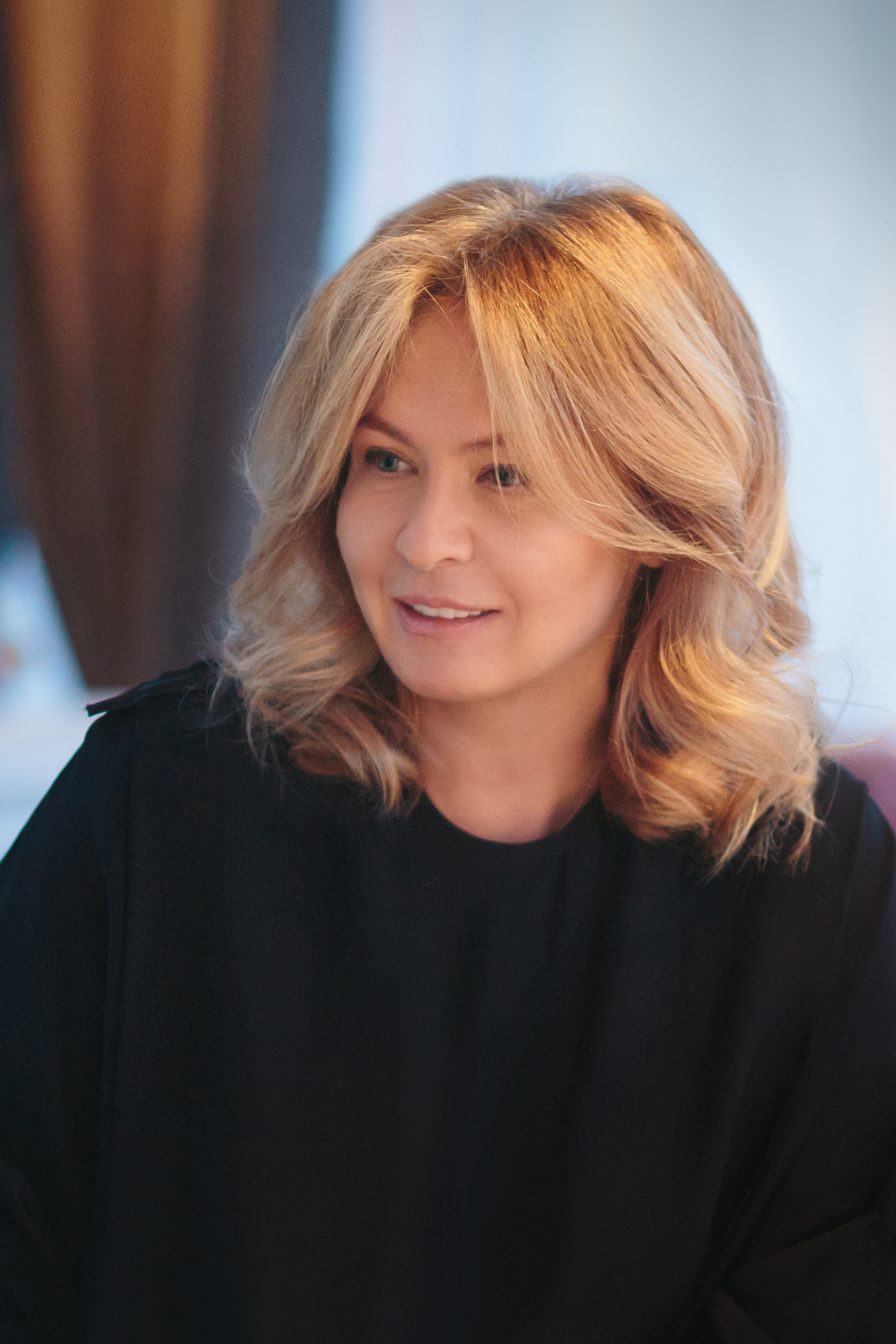
- Born: 25 October 1969 (age 56); Zadonsk, RSFSR
- Known for: Entrepreneur, investor
- Children: 3

Olga Alekseevna Belyavtseva (born 25 October 1969, Zadonsk) is a Russian entrepreneur, investor and business executive, a shareholder of Progress JSC and Agronom-Sad LLC, and the founder of the Evermount Capital Group private investment fund. She is also the chairman of the Children Committee of Business Russia.

In 2024, Belyavtseva was ranked second in Forbes Russia's "Top 10 Wealthiest Self-Made Women".

== Biography ==
Olga Belyavtseva was born on October 25 1969 in Zadonsk, and started her career in 1990. During the privatization period she joined the management team that established Lebedyansky Group.

Belyavtseva has been a shareholder and a member of the board of directors of Progress JSC.

She graduated with a degree in economics from the A. S. Griboedov Institute of International Law and Economics.

== Career ==
=== Evermount Capital Group ===
Since 2015, Belyavtseva has been developing the Evermount Capital Group investment fund, which focuses on food production, packaging, foodtech, digital solutions for the agricultural sector, and sustainable agriculture.

=== Lebedyansky Group ===
Throughout the 2000s, she participated in the development of the Lebedyansky Group's distribution platform, one of Russia's major juice manufacturers. The Group conducted an IPO in 2005, and was sold to PepsiCo and Pepsi Bottling Group consortium for 1.8 billion dollars in 2008.

=== Progress JSC ===
After leaving the Lebedyansky Group, Belyavtseva became a shareholder of Progress JSC, a company that produces children's nutrition products and is widely known in Russia under the brand FrutoNanny. During her tenure, the company secured a leading position in the Russian market. According to the Nielsen rating, Progress held a 35.5% share of the baby food market in 2024. Currently, the company is one of the major employers in Russia's FMCG segment.

In September 2024, the company underwent several changes to its shareholder structure due to Vladimir Lisin’s entry into the company’s capital. Belyavtseva kept her capital share.

=== Biplast LLC ===
Olga Belyavtseva is the owner of Biplast LLC, a company that specializes in producing homeware and plastic goods. Among its major clients are IKEA, Indesit and Beko.

=== Agronom-sad LLC ===
Starting in 2023, Belyavtseva began focusing on developing the agricultural sector. Agronom-Sad LLC (Gathered in the Garden brand) is one of the largest apple growers in Central Russia.

In terms of planting volumes, the company is currently one of the leaders in Eastern Europe.

Agronom-sad LLC is now a supplier for the “X5 Group”, “Magnit” and “Azbuka Vkusa” companies.

== Key deals ==
- The sale of Lebedyansky to PepsiCo in 2008. It was one of the biggest deals in Russian FMCG history.
- The sale of BiPack to Mondi Group in 2016 was valued at 2.8 billion rubles.
- Vladimir Lisin’s merger with Progress LLC capital in 2024.

== Ratings and Awards ==
- In 2021, Belyavtseva was included in Forbes' "Top 200 Russia's Richest Businessmen" with a net worth of 600 million dollars.
- She ranked 12th in Forbes Women in 2023.
- Belyavtseva ranked second in Forbes Russia's Richest Self-Made Women in 2024.
