= Lev Tolstoy (rural locality) =

Settlement in Lipetsk Oblast, Russia

Coordinates: 53°13′N 39°27′E

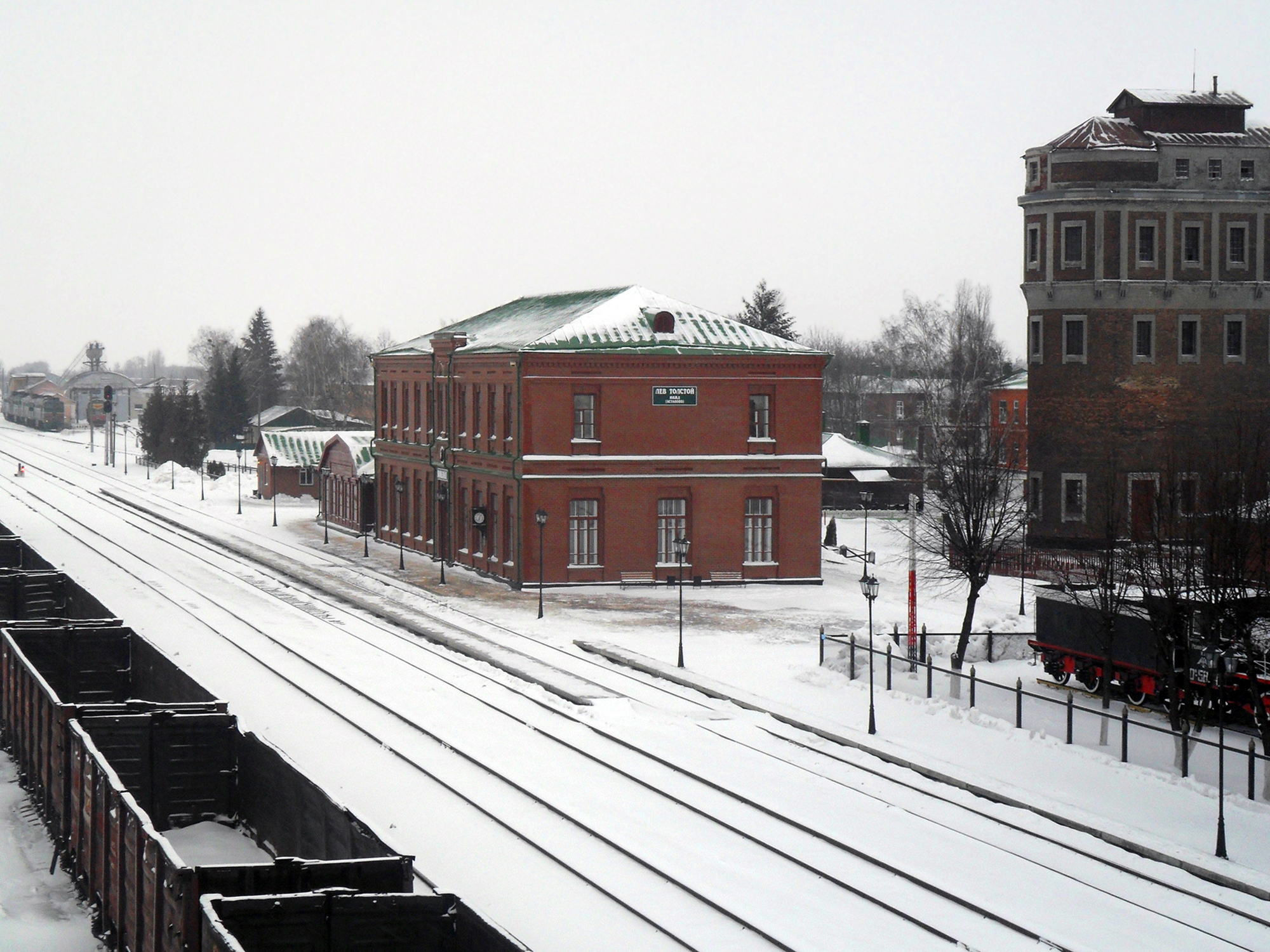
Lev Tolstoy railway station in 2010

Lev Tolstoy (Russian: Лев Толсто́й) is a rural locality (a settlement) and the administrative center of Lev-Tolstovsky District of Lipetsk Oblast, Russia. Population: 8,875 (2021 Census); 8,650 (2010 Census); 9,035 (2002 Census); 9,139 (1989 Soviet census). Until 1932 it was known as Astapovo.

== History ==
Astapovo railway station, built in 1891 on the intersection of the Kozlov–Volovo and Moscow–Yelets routes, was named after a nearby selo of Astapovo (Аста́пово), which was founded later than the mid-17th century. The name derives from the masculine first name Ostap. The Russian writer Leo Tolstoy fell ill at the Astapovo station and died here on November 20, 1910. To commemorate this event, the station was renamed Lva Tolstogo (Льва Толсто́го) in 1918. In 1932, the name of the station and of the settlement was changed to its modern form.
