= Galichya Gora =

Nature reserve in Lipetsk Oblast, Russia

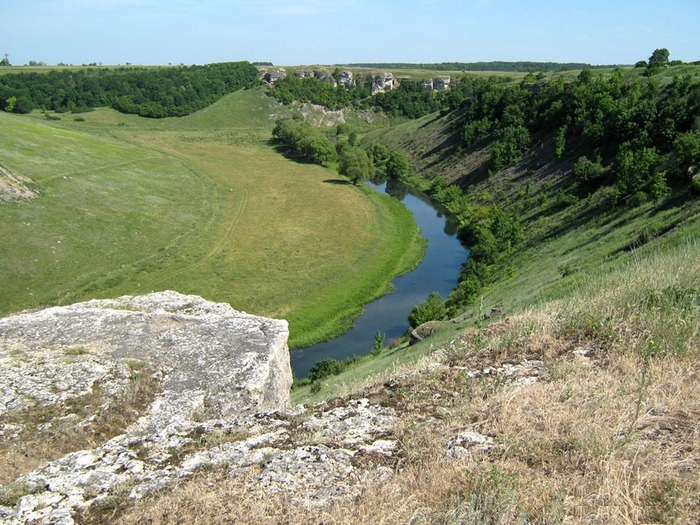
- Galichya Gora

- Location within Russia
- Location: Russia
- Nearest city: Zadonsk
- Coordinates: 52°36′5″N 38°55′42″E
- Area: 230 ha (570 acres)
- Established: 1925
- Governing body: Voronezh State University

Galichya Gora is a Zapovednik or nature reserve located in Yeletsky District of Lipetsk Oblast and is administered by Voronezh State University.

== History ==
Galichya Gora was founded on 25 April 1925. Originally it was administered by Yeletsky regional museum. However, on 17 April 1936, administration was transferred to Voronezh State University.

== Climate and ecoregion ==
Galichya Gora is located in the East European forest steppe ecoregion, a transition zone between the broadleaf forests of the north and the grasslands to the south.. This ecoregion is characterized by a mosaic of forests, steppe, and riverine wetlands.

The climate of Galichya Gora is Humid continental climate, warm summer (Köppen climate classification (Dfb)). This climate is characterized by large swings in temperature, both diurnally and seasonally, with mild summers and cold, snowy winters.

== Constituent areas ==
The reserve consists of six different areas:

- Galichya Gora, (the original reserve)
- Morozova Gora (added on 5 May 1941)
- Pluschan (added since 1953)
- Bykova Sheya (added since 1953)
- Voronov Kamen (added since 1953)
- Vorgolskoe (added since 1953)

== See also ==
- List of Russian Nature Reserves (class 1a 'zapovedniks')
- WikiCommons gallery: Galichya Gora
