= Kazaki =

Rural locality in Yeletsky District, Lipetsk Oblast, Russia

Coordinates: 52°38′00″N 38°16′19″E

Kazaki (Russian: Казаки́) is a rural locality (a selo) in Yeletsky District of Lipetsk Oblast, Russia. Population: 3,233 (2021 census); 3,395 (2010 Census); 3,256 (2002 Census).
