= Tatyana Dyakonova =

Russian politician (born 1970)

- Татьяна Дьяконова

Deputy of the 8th State Duma
- Incumbent
- Assumed office 19 September 2021

Personal details
- Born: 22 April 1970 (age 56) Osh, Kirghiz Soviet Socialist Republic, USSR
- Party: United Russia
- Education: Immanuel Kant Baltic Federal University

Tatyana Ivanovna Dyakonova (Russian: Татьяна Ивановна Дьяконова; born 22 April 1970, Osh, Kirghiz Soviet Socialist Republic) is a Russian politician and a deputy of the 8th State Duma. From 2018 to 2019, she worked as an assistant to the Minister of Economic Development Maxim Oreshkin. In 2019–2021, she headed the Department of Personnel Policy and Personnel Development of the Ministry of Economic Development. Since 2021, she has served as a deputy of the 8th State Duma from the Lipetsk Oblast constituency. She ran with the United Russia.

Tatyana Dyakonova is one of the winners of the prestigious competition Leaders of Russia initiated by the "Russia – Land of Opportunities" platform launched in 2017 by Vladimir Putin.

On September 19, 2021, she took part in the elections to the State Duma of the 8th convocation of the Russian Federation. She was listed as number two on regional group No. 35 of the United Russia party in the Lipetsk Oblast. As a result, she did not win a seat in the State Duma, but on September 29, 2021, she received a vacant deputy mandate. On December 4, 2021, she joined the United Russia party, after which she was elected to the Presidium of the party’s General Council.

== Family ==
Tatyana Dyakonova is married and has a son.

== Sanctions ==
She is one of the members of the State Duma the United States Treasury sanctioned on 24 March 2022 in response to the 2022 Russian invasion of Ukraine.

She was sanctioned by the UK government in 2022 in relation to the Russo-Ukrainian War.
