= Krasny Luch, Vladimir Oblast =

Krasny Luch Красный Луч
- Village
- Location within Vladimir Oblast Location within Russia
- Coordinates: 55°57′N 38°58′E
- Country: Russia
- Region: Vladimir Oblast
- District: Petushinsky District
- Time zone: UTC+3:00

Krasny Luch (Russian: Красный Луч) is a rural locality (a village) in Nagornoye Rural Settlement, Petushinsky District, Vladimir Oblast, Russia. The population was 36 as of 2010. There are 17 streets.

== Geography ==
Krasny Luch is located on the Kirzhach River, 39 km northwest of Petushki (the district's administrative centre) by road. Vetchi is the nearest rural locality.
