= Krasnoye, Krasninsky District, Lipetsk Oblast =

Rural locality in Lipetsk Oblast, Russia

Coordinates: 52°51′53″N 38°47′27″E

Krasnoye (Russian: Красное) is a rural locality (a selo) and the administrative center of Krasninsky District, Lipetsk Oblast, Russia. Population: 3,634 (2021 census); 3,832 (2010 census); 4.057 (2002 census); 4,338 (1989 Soviet census).

Krasnoye is the locality closest to Moscow (330 kilometres (210 miles) south of the city) where it was visually confirmed that Wagner Group troops had reached during their rebellion. The closest location overall may have been Kashira, but this is not confirmed.
