= Kazinka, Gryazinsky District, Lipetsk Oblast =

Rural locality in Gryazinsky District, Russia

Coordinates: 52°32′32″N 39°49′03″E

Kazinka (Russian: Казинка) is a village (selo) in Gryazinsky District of Lipetsk Oblast, Russia, located on the Matyrskoye Reservoir (formerly a part of the Matyra River) at its confluence with the Kazinchenka Spring (former Kazinka River).

Kazinka was settled by the peasants of the town of Romanov (modern village of Lenino) in the second half of the 17th century.

Historically, the village is divided into eight areas: Vygon, Kislyaki, Manezh, Moskovka, Podkamennoye, Svirkin Poryadok, Khutor, and Sikalovka.
