= Krasny Luch, Amur Oblast =

Krasny Luch Красный Луч
- Village
- Location within Amur Oblast Location within Russia
- Coordinates: 49°20′N 129°35′E
- Country: Russia
- Region: Amur Oblast
- District: Arkharinsky District
- Time zone: UTC+9:00

Krasny Luch (Russian: Красный Луч) is a rural locality (a selo) in Innokentyevsky Selsoviet of Arkharinsky District, Amur Oblast, Russia. The population was 34 as of 2018. There are 2 streets.

== Geography ==
Krasny Luch is located near the left bank of the Amur River, 44 km southwest of Arkhara (the district's administrative centre) by road. Innokentyevka is the nearest rural locality.
