= Voronezh State Technical University =

Russian public university

- Федеральное государственное бюджетное образовательное учреждение высшего образования «Воронежский государственный технический университет»
- Type: public
- Established: 1930s
- Rector: Dmitriy Proskurin
- Students: 20,000
- Location: Voronezh, Russia
- Campus: urban
- Language: Russian
- Website: https://cchgeu.ru/

Voronezh State Technical University (Russian: Воронежский государственный технический университет) is a public university located in Voronezh, Russia. It was established in 1956.

The university offers undergraduate, graduate, and doctoral programs across fields of study, including engineering, technology, economics, humanities, and natural sciences. VSTU places a strong emphasis on practical training and hands-on experience, ensuring that students are well-equipped with the necessary skills and knowledge to thrive in their chosen professions.

VSTU has a faculty of professors, researchers, and industry experts. The university maintains collaborations with industries and research organizations.

Voronezh State Technical University is known for its infrastructure and facilities. The university's campus provides laboratories, libraries, computer centers, and workshops.

== History ==
=== Background ===
During the years 1928-1934, the Central Chernozem Region served as an administrative and territorial unit within the Russian Soviet Federative Socialist Republic (RSFSR). Encompassing the territories that formerly belonged to the Voronezh, Kursk, Oryol, and Tambov governorates, the region's administrative center was Voronezh. At that time, the region was home to only two universities: Voronezh State University and Voronezh Agricultural University.

=== Timeline ===
- August 28, 1956: founded as the Voronezh Evening Machine-Building Institute;
- July 17, 1958: reorganized into the Voronezh Evening Polytechnic Institute;
- June 19, 1962: reorganized into the Voronezh Polytechnic Institute (VPI);
- September 22, 1993: renamed Voronezh State Technical University (VSTU).
- March 17, 2016: by order of the Ministry of Education and Science of the Russian Federation No. 224, VSTU and Voronezh State University of Architecture and Civil Engineering are reorganized into a regional flagship university of the Voronezh region (by joining VGASU to VSTU).

== Structure ==
- Road transport faculty
- Cultural and educational faculty
- Faculty of Civil Engineering
- Faculty of Architecture and Urban Planning
- Faculty of Engineering Systems and Structures
- Faculty of Information Technology and Computer Security
- Faculty of Mechanical Engineering and Aerospace Engineering
- Faculty of Radio Engineering and Electronics
- Faculty of Economics, Management and Information Technology
- Faculty of Energy and Control Systems
- Military Training Center
- Institute of International Education
- Construction Polytechnic College
- Graduate school
