= Lebedyansky (company) =

Russian food company

Lebedyansky JSC
- Type: Joint stock
- Industry: Food; Beverage
- Founded: 1967; 59 years ago
- Fate: Acquired by PepsiCo in 2008
- Headquarters: Lebedyan, Russia
- Key people: Brad Listenburg
- Products: Fruit and vegetable juices, baby food, soft drinks
- Revenue: ~ US$800 million (2007)
- Parent: PepsiCo

Lebedyansky (Russian: Лебедянский) is a Russian multi-national company that manufacturers fruit juice, baby food, vegetable juice, and soft drinks. The company is owned by PepsiCo, and is the largest fruit juice manufacturer in Eastern Europe and the sixth largest in the world. Lebedyansky has two major production centers, both located in the Lipetsk Oblast.

== History ==
In 1967, a cannery was established in Lebedyan, Lipetsk Oblast, around 350 kilometers south of Moscow. The company produced canned fruits and vegetables.

In 1992 the company was privatized and transformed into a joint stock company. In 1996, Lebedyansky launched its first branded product, "Tonus Juice" and in 1998, the company management decided to pursue a major expansion.

On 20 March 2008, PepsiCo announced their acquisition of 75.53% of Lebedyansky, for the sum of US$ 1.4 billion, making PepsiCo the largest shareholder, and parent company of Lebedyansky. The purchase was completed on 28 August 2008.

== Affiliated brands ==
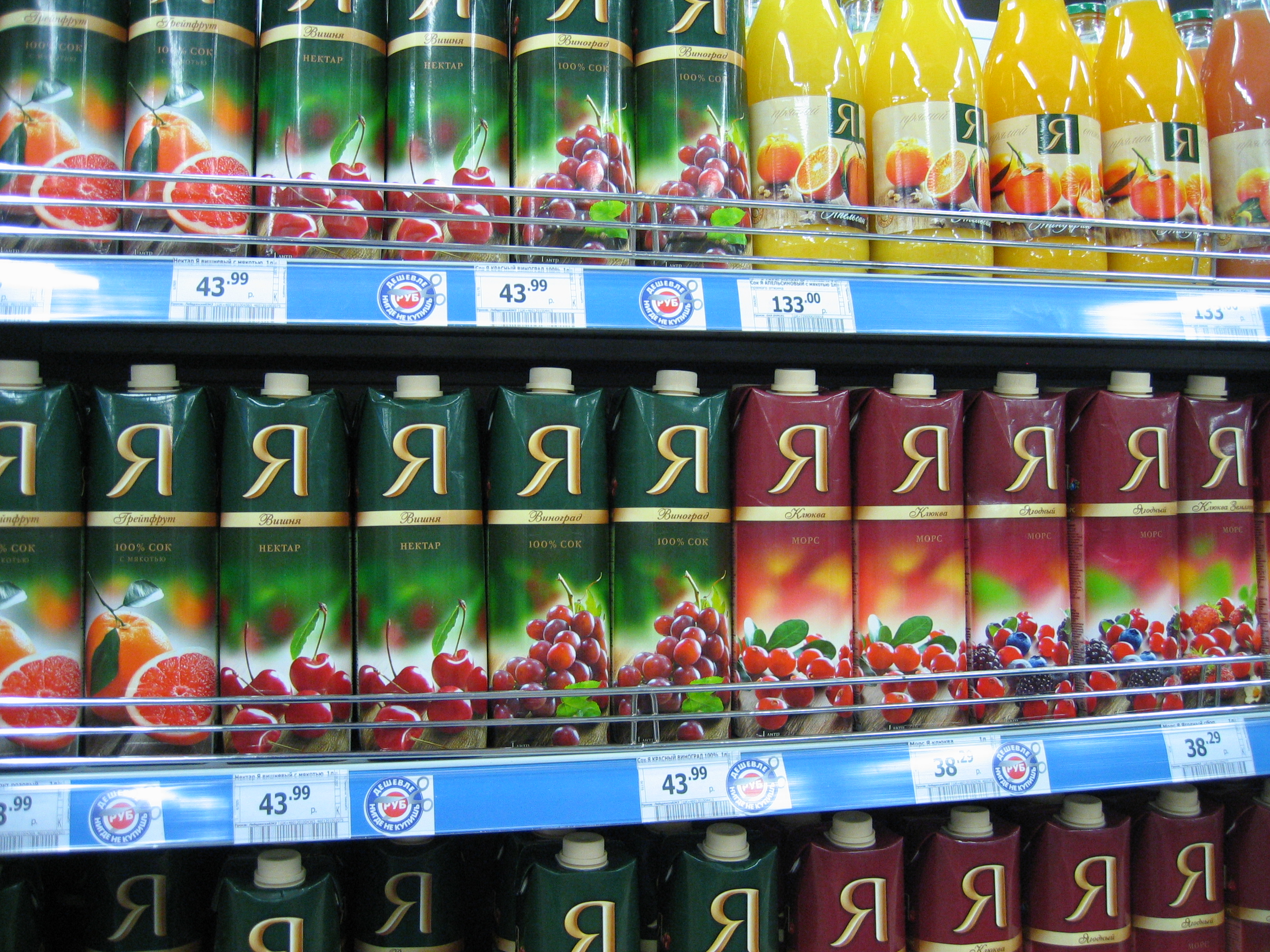
The Lebedyansky juices

In becoming the leading juice producer in Russia, Lebedyansky developed the following brands:

=== Premium ===
- Ya
  - 14 juices and nectars
  - 4 traditional Russian berry flavors

=== Mid-priced ===
- Tonus

=== Low-budget ===
- Fruktoviy Sad, a brand that received heavy advertising campaigns, by itself accounts for 16% of all juice sold in Russia
  - Apple Juice
  - Tomato Juice
  - 10 different fruit nectars
- Frustyle, a stylish brand that appeals to young people
  - Blood Orange
  - Kiwi
  - Mango-Papaya
  - Banana-Strawberry
- Privet

=== Baby food ===
- Lebedyanska
- Frutonjanja (en: Fruitnurse)

== Owners and management ==
In March 2005 Lebedyansky held an IPO in Russia, selling 19.9% of shares for 151 million dollars. Until the spring of 2008, the main owners of the company were State Duma deputy Nikolay Bortsov (30% of shares), his son Yuri Bortsov (25.13%), Olga Belyavtseva (18.4%), Dmitry Fadeev (2%); 23% of the company's shares were in free circulation. Capitalization at MICEX at the end of March 2008 was 40.6 billion rubles.

Having bought out the shares of the main owners and received the consent of the Federal Antimonopoly Service, PepsiCo began to buy back shares from minority shareholders. In the context of the financial crisis, PepsiCo's subsidiary Lebedyansky Holdings LLC offered attractive terms to minority shareholders and almost all of them agreed to the offer. In November 2009, Lebedyansky Holdings increased its stake to 100%, reducing the authorized capital by redeeming part of the outstanding ordinary shares. As of 31 December 2010, Lebedyansky OJSC is wholly owned by Lebedyansky Holdings LLC. On 2 February 2012, the company was transformed from Lebedyansky OJSC into Lebedyansky LLC.

The founders of Lebedyansky Holdings LLC are Frito Lay Manufacturing and PepsiCo Holdings.

The General Director is Maxim Viktorovich Mikhailov. Members of the Board of Directors: Tavkazakov Magomet Bashirovich (Chairman), Epifaniy Andreas, Mikhailov Maxim Viktorovich, Podchepaev Sergey Alekseevich, Kostikov Alexander Mikhailovich, Olkhova Olga Alekseevna, Marinus Lek.

== See also ==
- Wimm-Bill-Dann Foods, Russian yogurt and fruit juice producer, also owned by PepsiCo
- PepsiCo, American multi-national corporation, parent company, and largest shareholder of Lebedyansky
- Food industry of Russia
