= Lebedyan =

Town in Lipetsk Oblast, Russia

Lebedyan Лебедянь
- Town
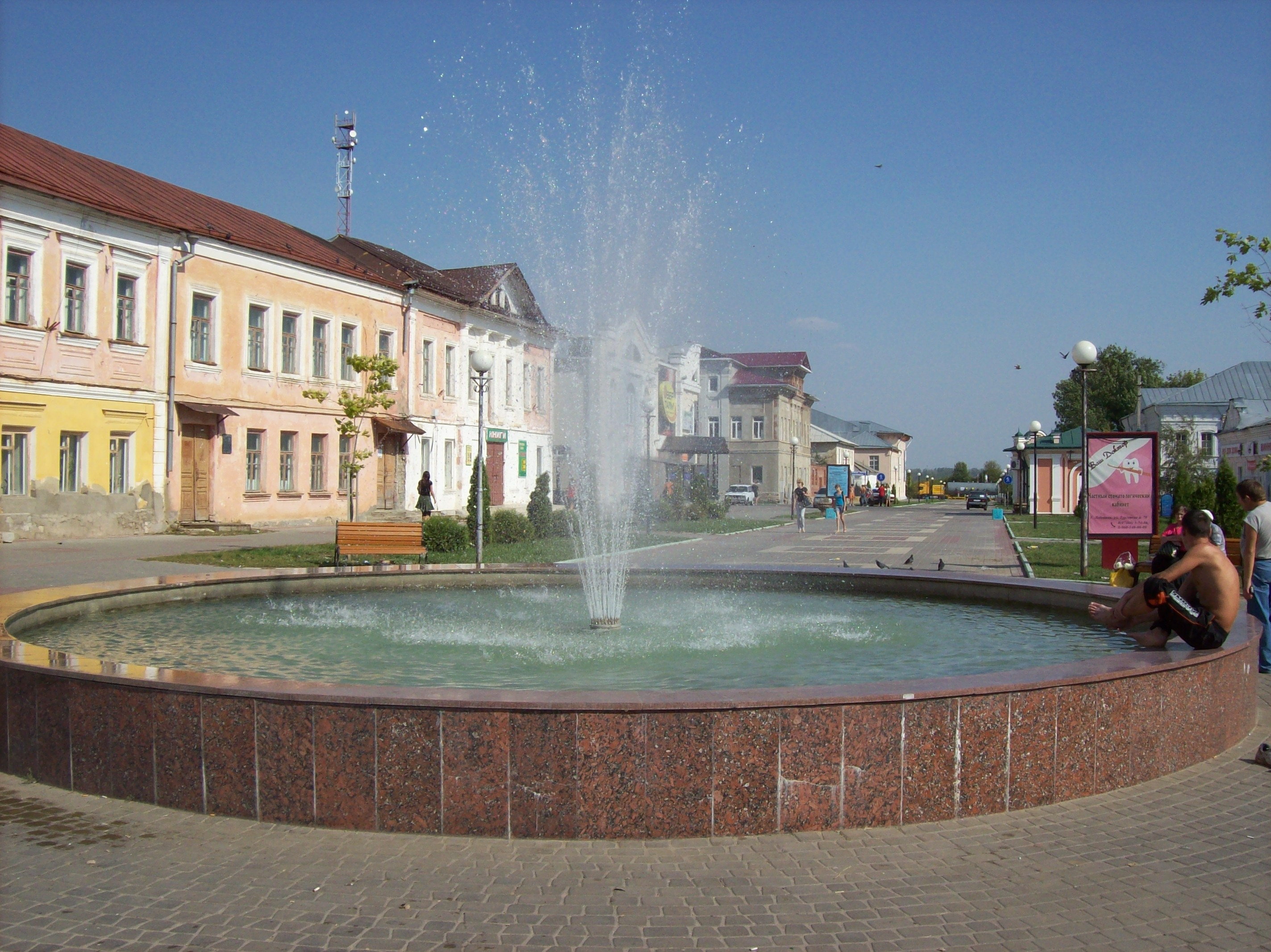
- Central Lebedyan

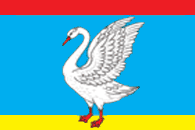
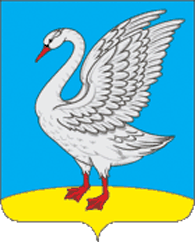
- Flag Coat of arms
- Interactive map of Lebedyan
- Location of Lebedyan Lebedyan (Lipetsk Oblast)
- Coordinates: 53°01′N 39°09′E
- Country: Russia
- Federal subject: Lipetsk Oblast
- Administrative district: Lebedyansky District
- Town under district jurisdictionSelsoviet: Lebedyan
- Founded: 1613
- Town status since: 1779
- Elevation: 160 m (520 ft)

Population (2010 Census)
  - Total: 21,012
  - Estimate (2021): 20,049 (−4.6%)

Administrative status
  - Capital of: Lebedyansky District, Lebedyan Town Under District Jurisdiction

Municipal status
  - Municipal district: Lebedyansky Municipal District
  - Urban settlement: Lebedyan Urban Settlement
  - Capital of: Lebedyansky Municipal District, Lebedyan Urban Settlement
- Time zone: UTC+3 (MSK)
- Postal codes: 399610–399613, 399619
- OKTMO ID: 42633101001
- Website: lebedyan.lipetsk.ru

Lebedyan (Russian: Лебедя́нь) is a town and the administrative center of Lebedyansky District in Lipetsk Oblast, Russia. It is located on the upper Don River, 62 kilometers (39 mi) northwest of Lipetsk, the administrative center of the oblast. Population: 20,049 (2021 census); 21,012 (2010 census); 22,966 (2002 census); 22,850 (1989 Soviet census).

== History ==
It was founded in 1613 largely to guard the holdings of I. N. Romanov, Tsar Michael I's uncle, and served as a border outpost protecting South Russia from the Crimean Tatars' incursions. The Trinity Monastery was established in 1621 and several churches were built by the end of the century; they are all now reduced to ruins.

Chartered in 1779, Lebedyan developed in the 19th century as a center of horse racing and horse breeding. Locals claim that the first racetrack in Russia was opened here in 1826. The Agricultural Society of Lebedyan, founded in 1847, was influential in preparing the emancipation reform of 1861.

In 1984 construction of an underground metro began as hobby tunneling. However, this was abandoned in 2010 without having opened.

== Administrative and municipal status ==
Within Russia's framework of administrative divisions, Lebedyan serves as the administrative center of Lebedyansky District. As an administrative division, it is incorporated within Lebedyansky District as Lebedyan Town Under District Jurisdiction. As a municipal division, Lebedyan Town Under District Jurisdiction is incorporated within Lebedyansky Municipal District as Lebedyan Urban Settlement.

== Economy ==
The town is the location of the largest fruit juice manufacturer in Eastern Europe, Lebedyansky.

== Architecture ==
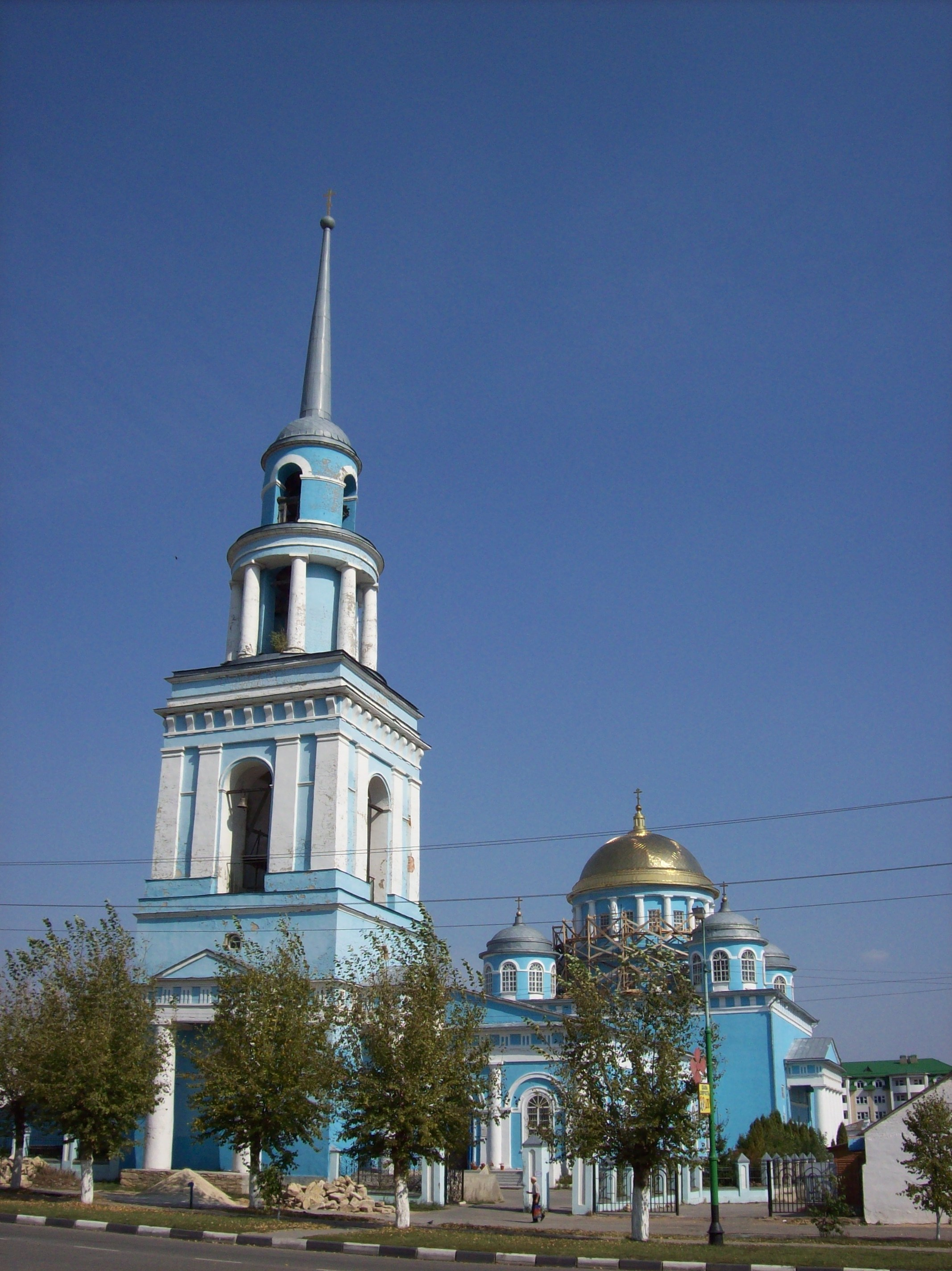
The New Cathedral

Lebedyan has two cathedrals, both dedicated to the icon of the Theotokos of Kazan. The old and neglected cathedral goes back to the 18th century, while the larger cathedral on the market square was designed in the Empire style and consecrated in 1839.

== Notable people ==
Lebedyan is the birthplace of the author Yevgeny Zamyatin. Other former residents of the town include the authors Mikhail Bulgakov and Andrey Bely. Ivan Turgenev incorporated a story titled Lebedyan in his collection A Sportsman's Sketches. It was also the home of Leonid Mulyarchik, who attempted to singlehandedly build a subway system in the town. (He eventually gave up on the project.)
