= Dankov =

Town in Lipetsk Oblast, Russia

Dankov Данков
- Town
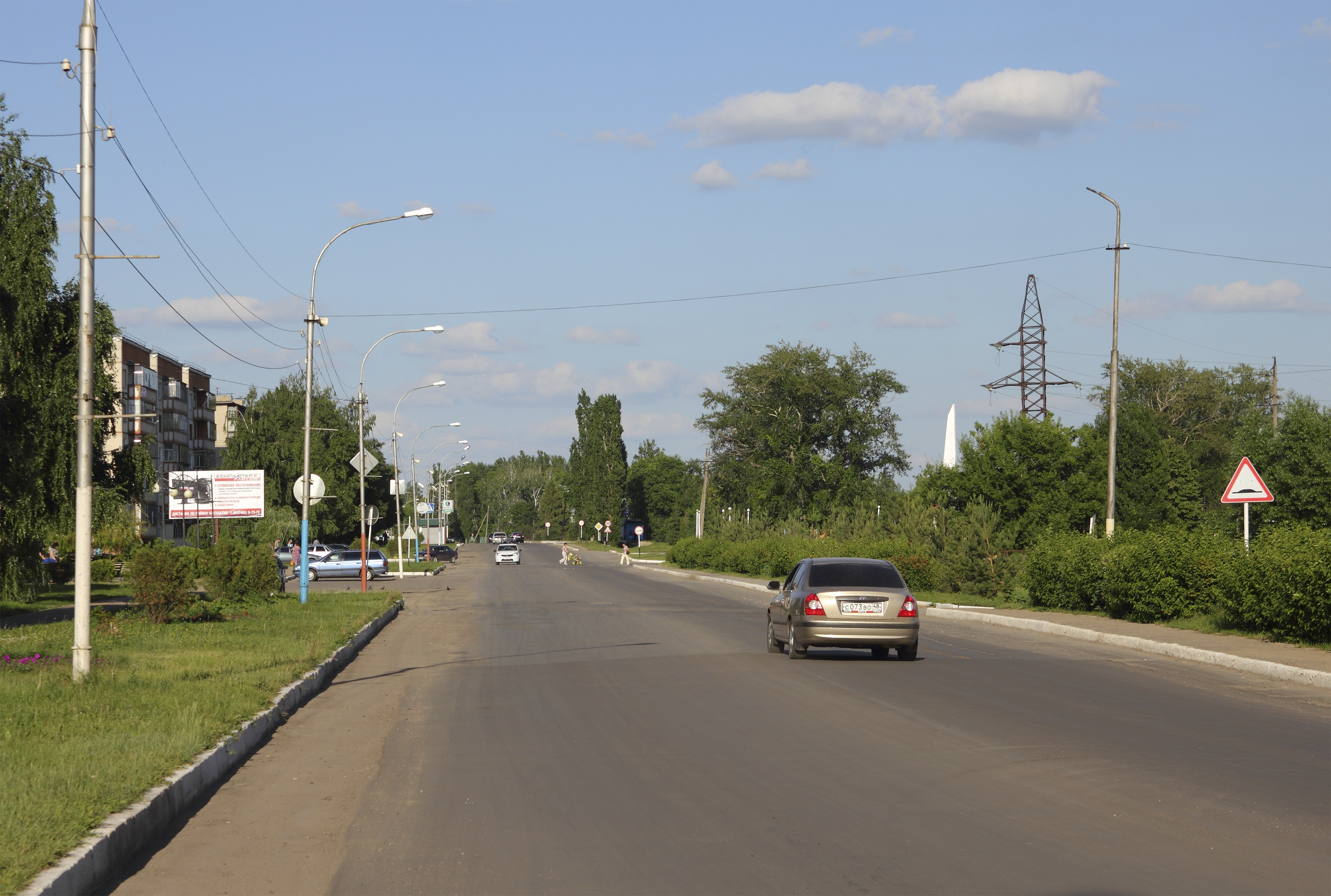
- Mira Street in Dankov

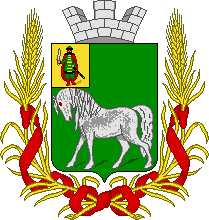
- Coat of arms
- Interactive map of Dankov
- Location of Dankov Dankov (Lipetsk Oblast)
- Coordinates: 53°15′N 39°08′E
- Country: Russia
- Federal subject: Lipetsk Oblast
- Administrative district: Dankovsky District
- Town under district jurisdictionSelsoviet: Dankov
- Founded: late 14th century
- Town status since: 1959
- Elevation: 140 m (460 ft)

Population (2010 Census)
  - Total: 21,064
  - Estimate (2021): 19,726 (−6.4%)

Administrative status
  - Capital of: Dankovsky District, Dankov Town Under District Jurisdiction

Municipal status
  - Municipal district: Dankovsky Municipal District
  - Urban settlement: Dankov Urban Settlement
  - Capital of: Dankovsky Municipal District, Dankov Urban Settlement
- Time zone: UTC+3 (MSK)
- Postal codes: 399850–399854, 399859
- OKTMO ID: 42609101001
- Website: web.archive.org/web/20130414024054/http://xn--80adbgh2auj.xn--p1ai/

Dankov (Russian: Данко́в) is a town and the administrative center of Dankovsky District in Lipetsk Oblast, Russia, located on the Don River 86 kilometers (53 mi) northwest of Lipetsk, the administrative center of the oblast. Population: 19,726 (2021 census); 21,064 (2010 census); 23,249 (2002 census); 24,659 (1989 Soviet census). It was previously known as Donkov.

== History ==
The fort of Donkov was founded by the Princes of Ryazan in the late 14th century and took its name from the Don River. The fort stood on the left bank of the Don, about 34 kilometers (21 mi) from the modern town, until 1568, when it was destroyed by the Crimean Tatars. It was then restored on a better fortified location but was again relocated in 1618. It is shown as Donko in Mercator's Atlas (1596), and as Donkagorod in Resania in Joan Blaeu's map of 1645.

By the 18th century, its spelling changed from Donkov to Dankov. The town was chartered by Catherine the Great but was demoted in status to that of a rural locality between 1796 and 1804 and again between 1924 and 1959.

On the night of 25 September 1918, during the Russian Civil War eleven hostages being held by the Ryazan Region Cheka were executed on wasteland adjoining the Dankov town cemetery. In 2011 descendants of the hostages raised crosses and a memorial there.

== Administrative and municipal status ==
Within the framework of administrative divisions, Dankov serves as the administrative center of Dankovsky District. As an administrative division, it is incorporated within Dankovsky District as Dankov Town Under District Jurisdiction. As a municipal division, Dankov Town Under District Jurisdiction is incorporated within Dankovsky Municipal District as Dankov Urban Settlement.
