= Volovo, Lipetsk Oblast =

Volovo Волово
- Selo
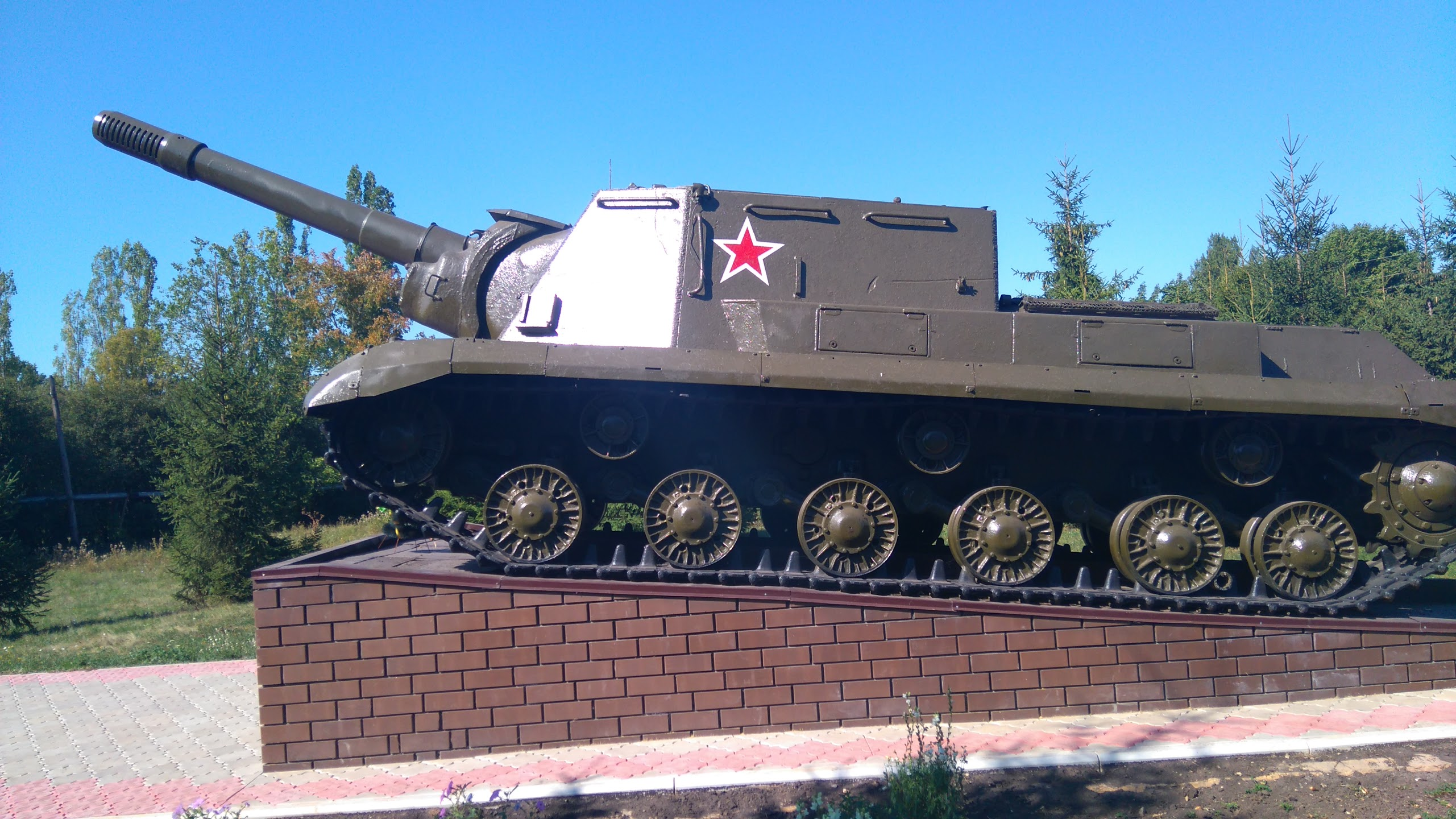
- Interactive map of Volovo
- Location of Volovo Volovo (Lipetsk Oblast)
- Coordinates: 52°01′35″N 37°53′15″E
- Country: Russia
- Federal subject: Lipetsk Oblast
- Administrative district: Volovsky District
- SelsovietSelsoviet: Volovsky
- First mentioned: 1794
- Elevation: 183 m (600 ft)

Population (2010 Census)
  - Total: 3,734
  - Estimate (2021): 3,373 (−9.7%)

Administrative status
  - Capital of: Volovsky District, Volovsky Selsoviet

Municipal status
  - Municipal district: Volovsky Municipal District
  - Rural settlement: Volovsky Selsoviet Rural Settlement
  - Capital of: Volovsky Municipal District, Volovsky Selsoviet Rural Settlement
- Time zone: UTC+3 (MSK)
- Postal code: 399580
- OKTMO ID: 42603416101

Volovo (Russian: Воло́во) is a rural locality (a selo) and the administrative center of Volovsky District of Lipetsk Oblast, Russia. Population: 3,373 (2021 census); 3,734 (2010 census); 4,072 (2002 census); 4,307 (1989 Soviet census).
