= Donskoye, Lipetsk Oblast =

Donskoye Донское
- Selo
- Interactive map of Donskoye
- Location of Donskoye Donskoye (Lipetsk Oblast)
- Coordinates: 52°36′46″N 38°59′17″E
- Country: Russia
- Federal subject: Lipetsk Oblast
- Administrative district: Zadonsky District

Population (2010 Census)
  - Total: 3,807
  - Estimate (2021): 3,953 (+3.8%)
- Time zone: UTC+3 (MSK)
- Postal code: 399240
- OKTMO ID: 42624424101

Donskoye (Russian: Донское) is a rural locality (a selo) in Zadonsky District of Lipetsk Oblast, Russia. Population: 3,953 (2021 census);

== Geography ==
Donskoye is located in the center of the Lipetsk Oblast, on the left bank of the Don River at the confluence of it and the Studenetz creek.

== History ==
Founded in 16th century. One of the first owners of the settlement was Nikita Romanovich Zakharyin-Yuriev - a grandfather of Michael I of Russia.

== Population ==
Year	Population
1779	710 (males)
1898	up to 5,000
1902	6,000
2010	3,807 (2010 census);
2021	3,953 (2021 census);
