= Lev-Tolstovsky District =

Lev-Tolstovsky District Лев-Толстовский район (Russian)
- District
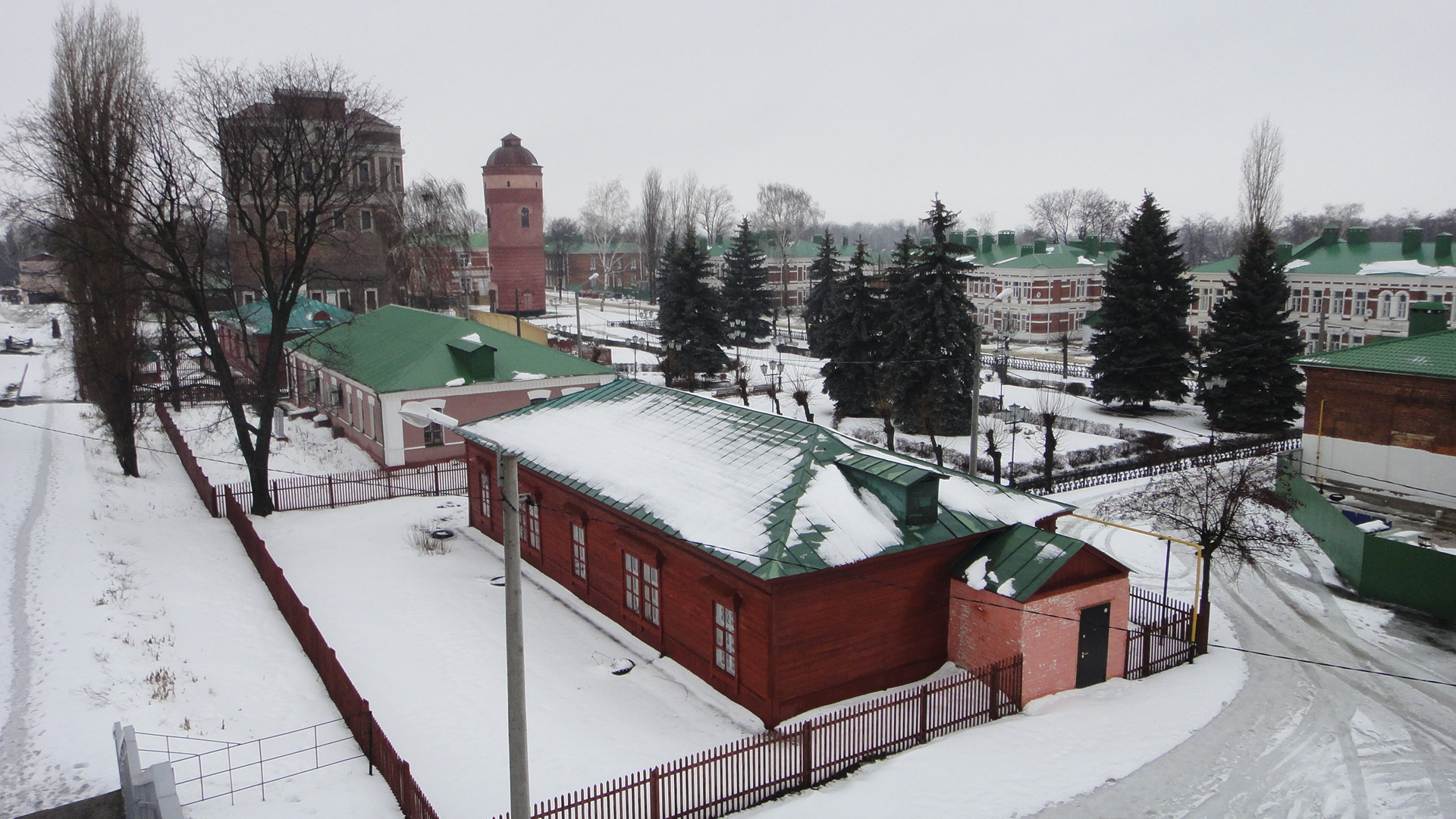
- Square in Lev Tolstoy, Lev-Tolstovsky District

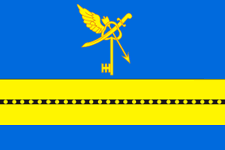
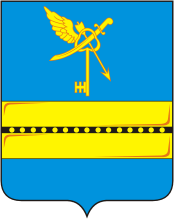
- Flag Coat of arms
- Location of Lev-Tolstovsky District in Lipetsk Oblast
- Coordinates: 53°12′28″N 39°26′57″E
- Country: Russia
- Federal subject: Lipetsk Oblast
- Established: 30 July 1928
- Administrative center: Lev Tolstoy

Area
  - Total: 968 km^{2} (374 sq mi)

Population (2010 Census)
  - Total: 17,141
  - Density: 17.7/km^{2} (45.9/sq mi)
  - Urban: 0%
  - Rural: 100%

Administrative structure
  - Administrative divisions: 10 selsoviet
  - Inhabited localities: 45 rural localities

Municipal structure
  - Municipally incorporated as: Lev-Tolstovsky Municipal District
  - Municipal divisions: 0 urban settlements, 10 rural settlements
- Time zone: UTC+3 (MSK)
- OKTMO ID: 42636000
- Website: http://lev-adm.ru/

Lev-Tolstovsky District (Russian: Лев-Толсто́вский райо́н) is an administrative and municipal district (raion), one of the eighteen in Lipetsk Oblast, Russia. It is located in the north of the oblast. The area of the district is 968 square kilometers (374 sq mi). Its administrative center is the rural locality (a settlement) of Lev Tolstoy.

== Demographics ==
Population: 16,850 (2021 census); 17,141 (2010 census); 17,862 (2002 Census); 17,748 (1989 Soviet census). The population of Lev Tolstoy accounts for 52.7% of the district's total population.
