= Krasninsky District, Lipetsk Oblast =

Krasninsky District Краснинский район (Russian)
- District
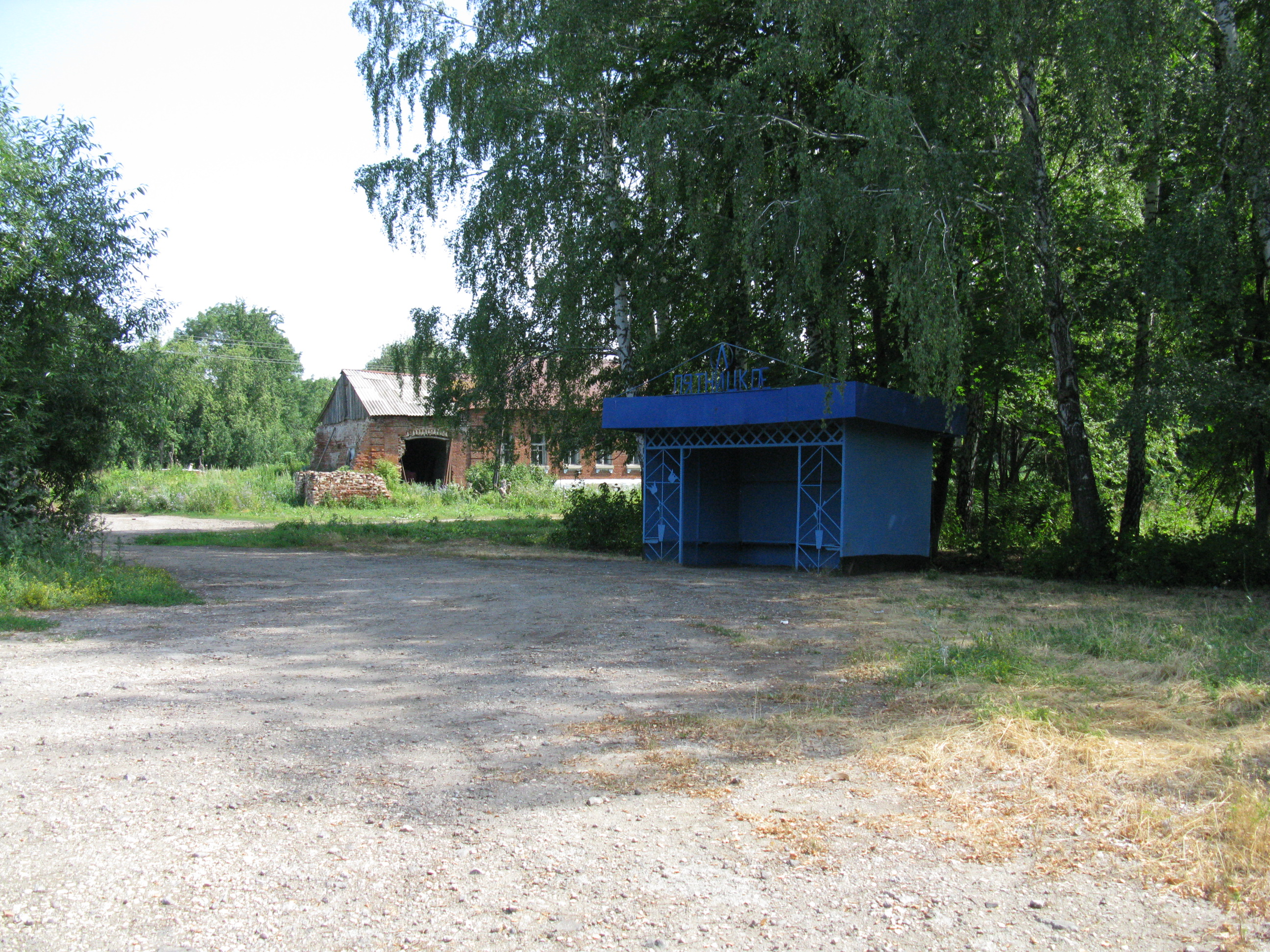
- Village (selo) Pyatnickoe, Krasninsky District

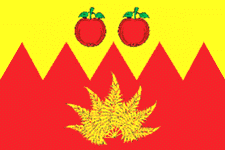
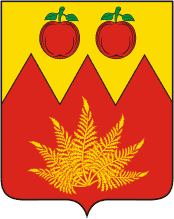
- Flag Coat of arms
- Location of Krasninsky District in Lipetsk Oblast
- Coordinates: 52°51′N 38°47′E
- Country: Russia
- Federal subject: Lipetsk Oblast
- Established: 30 July 1928
- Administrative center: Krasnoye

Area
  - Total: 980 km^{2} (380 sq mi)

Population (2010 Census)
  - Total: 13,498
  - Density: 14/km^{2} (36/sq mi)
  - Urban: 0%
  - Rural: 100%

Administrative structure
  - Administrative divisions: 8 selsoviet
  - Inhabited localities: 87 rural localities

Municipal structure
  - Municipally incorporated as: Krasninsky Municipal District
  - Municipal divisions: 0 urban settlements, 8 rural settlements
- Time zone: UTC+3 (MSK)
- OKTMO ID: 42630000
- Website: http://www.admkrasnoe.ru/

Krasninsky District (Russian: Кра́снинский райо́н) is an administrative and municipal district (raion), one of the eighteen in Lipetsk Oblast, Russia. It is located in the northwest of the oblast. The area of the district is 980 square kilometers (380 sq mi). Its administrative center is the rural locality (a selo) of Krasnoye. Population: 13,374 (2021 census); 13,498 (2010 census); 15,728 (2002 Census); 16,335 (1989 Soviet census). The population of Krasnoye accounts for 27.2% of the district's total population.
