= Volovsky District, Lipetsk Oblast =

Volovsky District Воловский район (Russian)
- District
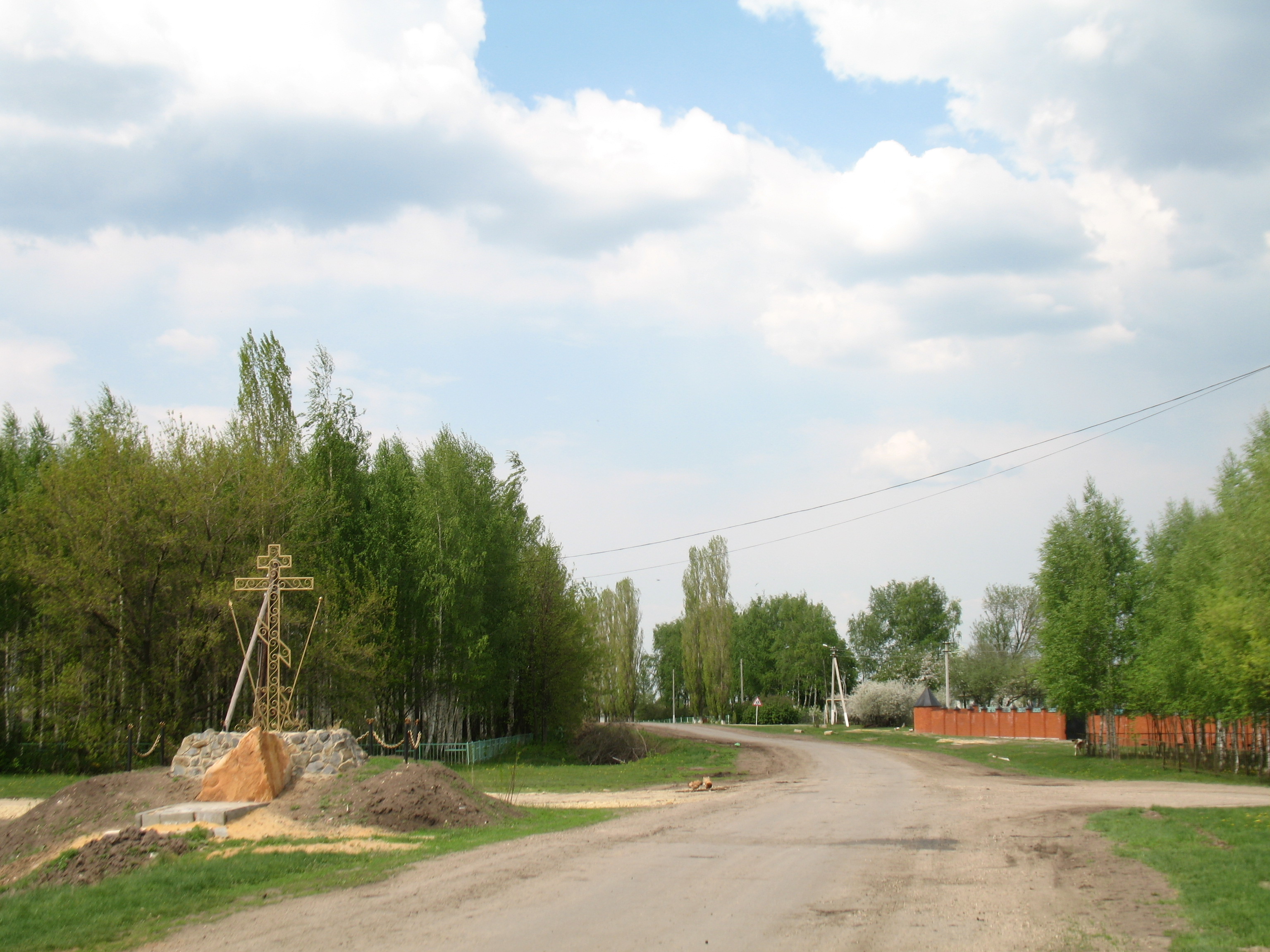
- Blagoveschensky Monastery, Volovsky District

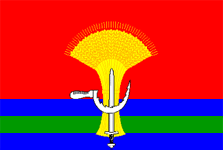
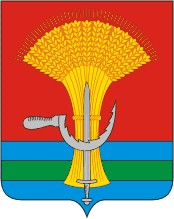
- Flag Coat of arms
- Location of Volovsky District in Lipetsk Oblast
- Coordinates: 52°01′08″N 37°52′55″E
- Country: Russia
- Federal subject: Lipetsk Oblast
- Administrative center: Volovo

Area
  - Total: 796 km^{2} (307 sq mi)

Population (2010 Census)
  - Total: 14,632
  - Density: 18.4/km^{2} (47.6/sq mi)
  - Urban: 0%
  - Rural: 100%

Administrative structure
  - Administrative divisions: 15 selsoviet
  - Inhabited localities: 77 rural localities

Municipal structure
  - Municipally incorporated as: Volovsky Municipal District
  - Municipal divisions: 0 urban settlements, 15 rural settlements
- Time zone: UTC+3 (MSK)
- OKTMO ID: 42603000
- Website: http://www.admvolovo.ru/

Volovsky District (Russian: Воло́вский райо́н) is an administrative and municipal district (raion), one of the eighteen in Lipetsk Oblast, Russia. It is located in the southwest of the oblast. The area of the district is 796 square kilometers (307 sq mi). Its administrative center is the rural locality (a selo) of Volovo. Population: 12,852 (2021 census); 14,632 (2010 census); 16,374 (2002 Census); 18,583 (1989 Soviet census). The population of Volovo accounts for 26.2% of the district's total population.
