= Gryazi =

Town in Lipetsk Oblast, Russia

Gryazi Грязи
- Town
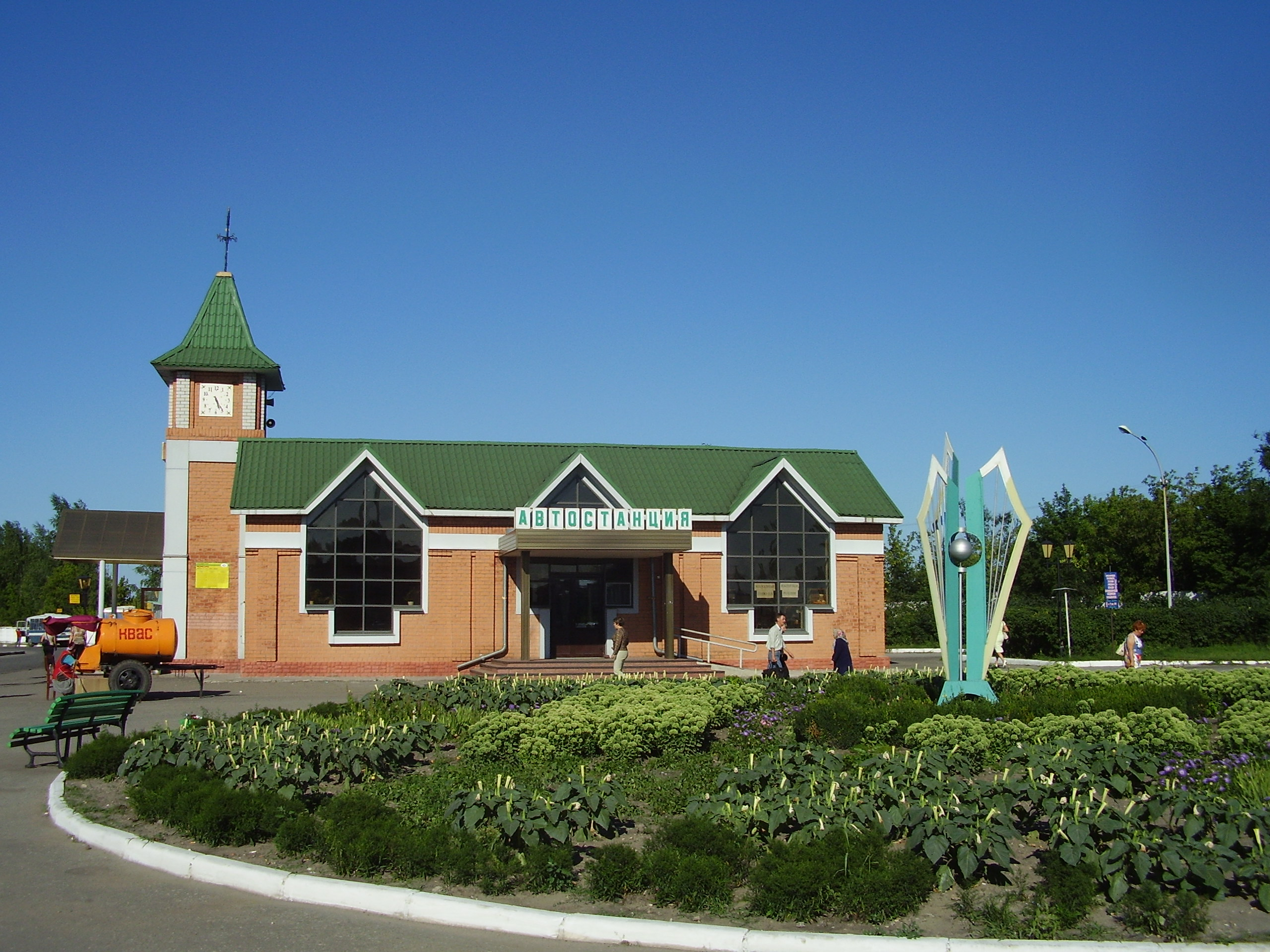
- Bus station in Gryazi

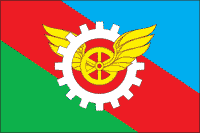
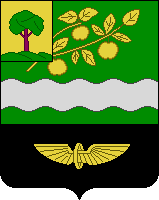
- Flag Coat of arms
- Interactive map of Gryazi
- Location of Gryazi Gryazi (Lipetsk Oblast)
- Coordinates: 52°30′N 39°58′E
- Country: Russia
- Federal subject: Lipetsk Oblast
- Administrative district: Gryazinsky District
- Town under district jurisdictionSelsoviet: Gryazi
- Founded: second half of the 19th century
- Town status since: 1938
- Elevation: 120 m (390 ft)

Population (2010 Census)
  - Total: 46,807
  - Estimate (2025): 43,640 (−6.8%)

Administrative status
  - Capital of: Gryazinsky District, Gryazi Town Under District Jurisdiction

Municipal status
  - Municipal district: Gryazinsky Municipal District
  - Urban settlement: Gryazi Urban Settlement
  - Capital of: Gryazinsky Municipal District, Gryazi Urban Settlement
- Time zone: UTC+3 (MSK)
- Postal codes: 399050, 399053–399061, 399099
- OKTMO ID: 42606101001

Gryazi (Russian: Гря́зи) is a town and the administrative center of Gryazinsky District in Lipetsk Oblast, Russia, located on the Matyra River (left tributary of the Voronezh; Don's basin) 30 kilometers (19 mi) southeast of Lipetsk, the administrative center of the oblast. Population: 43,908 (2021 census); 46,807 (2010 census); 47,478 (2002 census); 47,458 (1989 Soviet census).

== History ==
It was founded in the second half of the 19th century as a settlement around the Gryazi railway station, which was opened in 1868. Town status was granted to it in 1938.

== Administrative and municipal status ==
Within the framework of administrative divisions, Gryazi serves as the administrative center of Gryazinsky District. As an administrative division, it is incorporated within Gryazinsky District as Gryazi Town Under District Jurisdiction. As a municipal division, Gryazi Town Under District Jurisdiction is incorporated within Gryazinsky Municipal District as Gryazi Urban Settlement.
