= Dankovsky District =

Dankovsky District Данковский район (Russian)
- District
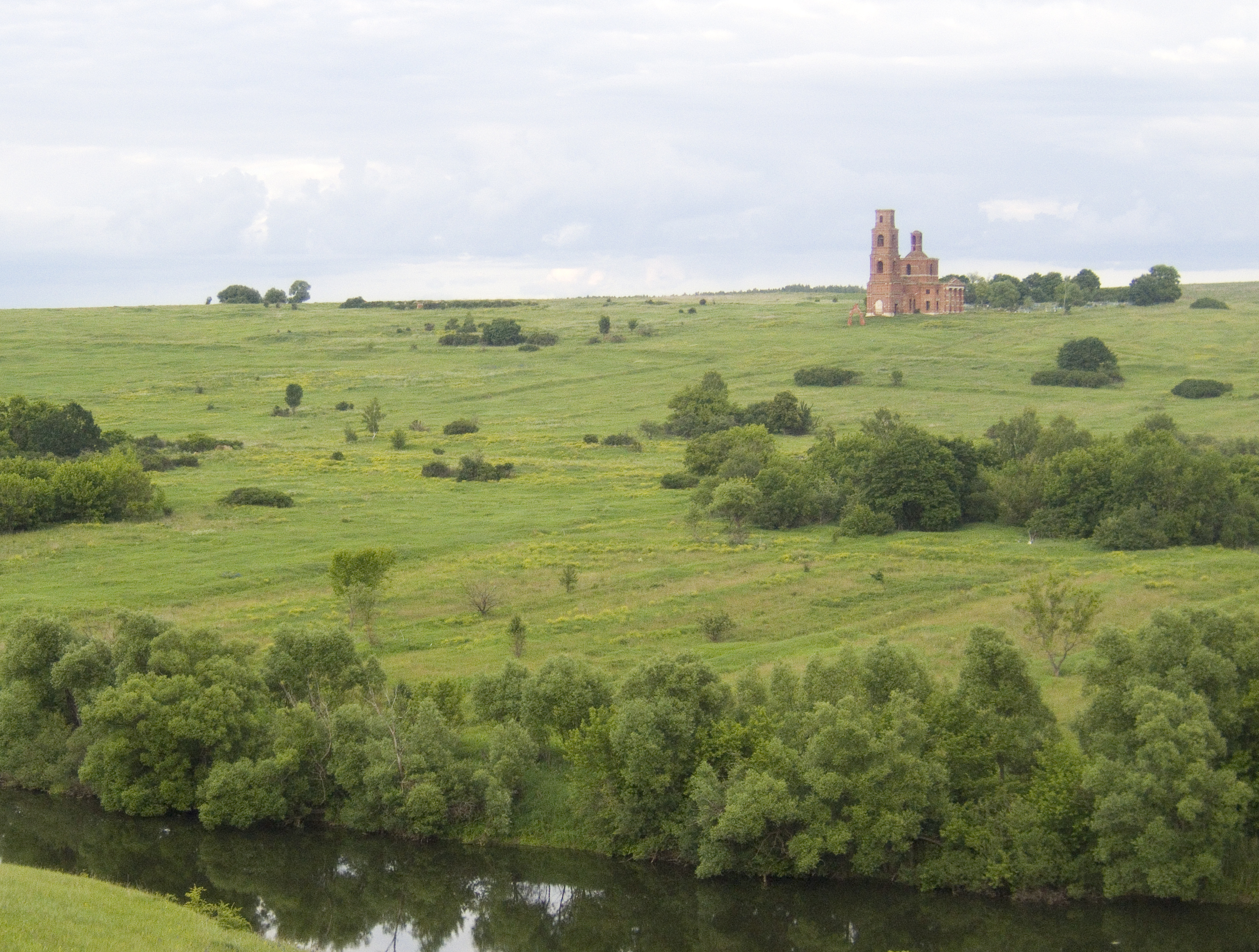
- View of 18th century church across the Don River, Danovsky District

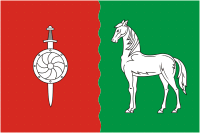
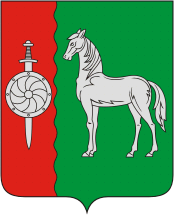
- Flag Coat of arms
- Location of Dankovsky District in Lipetsk Oblast
- Coordinates: 52°21′N 39°09′E
- Country: Russia
- Federal subject: Lipetsk Oblast
- Established: 30 July 1928
- Administrative center: Dankov

Area
  - Total: 1,894.85 km^{2} (731.61 sq mi)

Population (2010 Census)
  - Total: 35,468
  - Density: 18.718/km^{2} (48.480/sq mi)
  - Urban: 59.4%
  - Rural: 40.6%

Administrative structure
  - Administrative divisions: 1 Towns under district jurisdiction, 15 Selsoviets
  - Inhabited localities: 1 cities/towns, 148 rural localities

Municipal structure
  - Municipally incorporated as: Dankovsky Municipal District
  - Municipal divisions: 1 urban settlements, 15 rural settlements
- Time zone: UTC+3 (MSK)
- OKTMO ID: 42609000
- Website: http://www.admdankov.ru/

Dankovsky District (Russian: Данко́вский райо́н) is an administrative and municipal district (raion), one of the eighteen in Lipetsk Oblast, Russia. It is located in the north of the oblast. The area of the district is 1,894.85 square kilometers (731.61 sq mi). Its administrative center is the town of Dankov. Population: 33,271 (2021 census); 35,468 (2010 census); 40,766 (2002 Census); 19,040 (1989 Soviet census). The population of Dankov accounts for 59.3% of the district's total population.

== See also ==
- Polibino
