= Lebedyansky District =

Lebedyansky District Лебедянский район (Russian)
- District
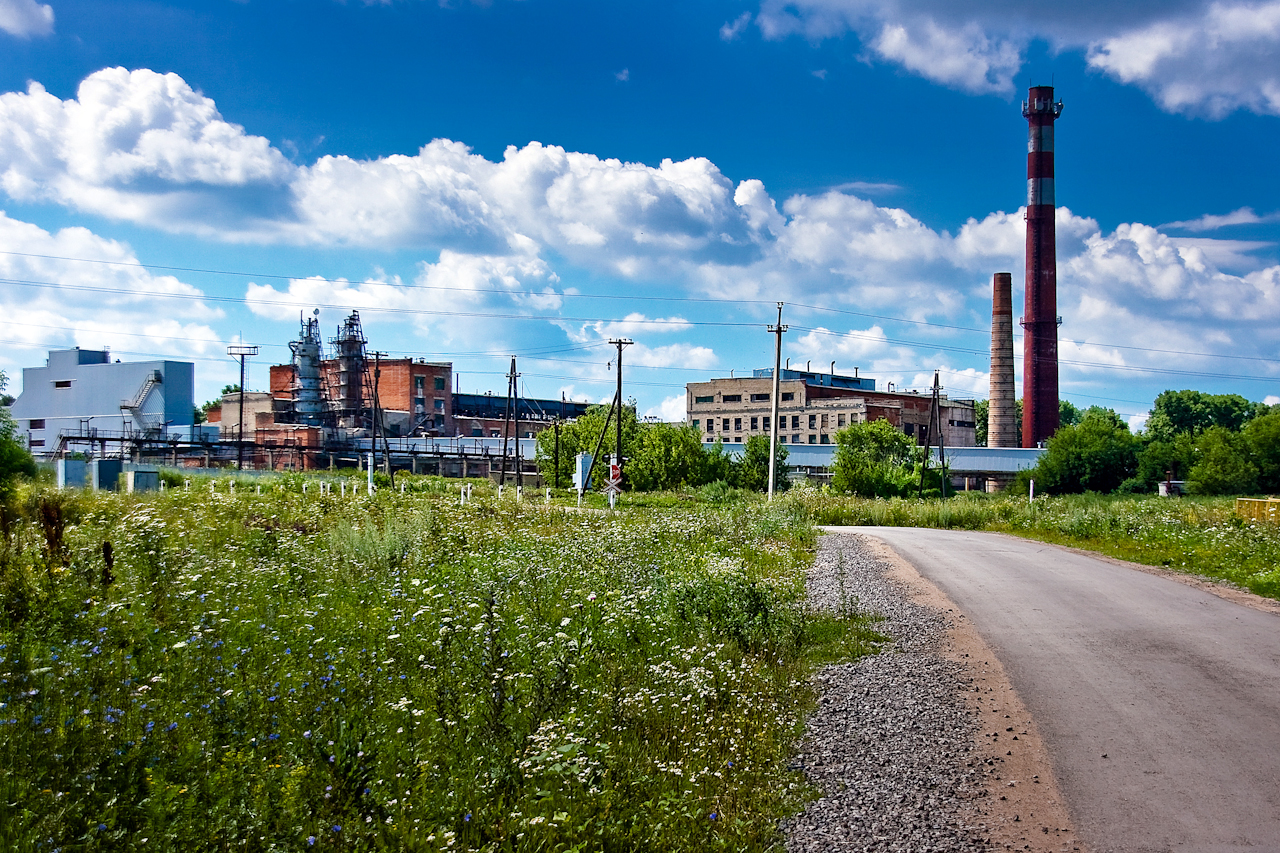
- Sugar Factory in Bolshoye Popovo, Lebedyansky District

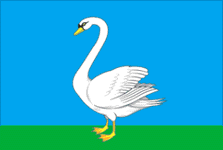
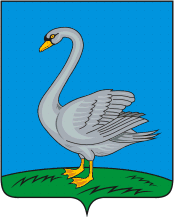
- Flag Coat of arms
- Location of Lebedyansky District in Lipetsk Oblast
- Coordinates: 53°01′N 39°08′E
- Country: Russia
- Federal subject: Lipetsk Oblast
- Established: 30 July 1928
- Administrative center: Lebedyan

Area
  - Total: 1,420 km^{2} (550 sq mi)

Population (2010 Census)
  - Total: 43,178
  - Density: 30.4/km^{2} (78.8/sq mi)
  - Urban: 48.7%
  - Rural: 51.3%

Administrative structure
  - Administrative divisions: 1 Towns under district jurisdiction, 16 Selsoviets
  - Inhabited localities: 1 cities/towns, 88 rural localities

Municipal structure
  - Municipally incorporated as: Lebedyansky Municipal District
  - Municipal divisions: 1 urban settlements, 16 rural settlements
- Time zone: UTC+3 (MSK)
- OKTMO ID: 42633000
- Website: http://www.lebadm.lipetsk.ru/

Lebedyansky District (Russian: Лебедя́нский райо́н) is an administrative and municipal district (raion), one of the eighteen in Lipetsk Oblast, Russia. It is located in the northern central part of the oblast. The area of the district is 1,445 square kilometers (558 sq mi). Its administrative center is the town of Lebedyan. Population: 40,686 (2021 census); 43,178 (2010 census); 46,644 (2002 Census); 46,250 (1989 Soviet census). The population of Lebedyan accounts for 49.3% of the district's total population.
