= Lipetsky District =

Lipetsky District Липецкий район (Russian)
- District
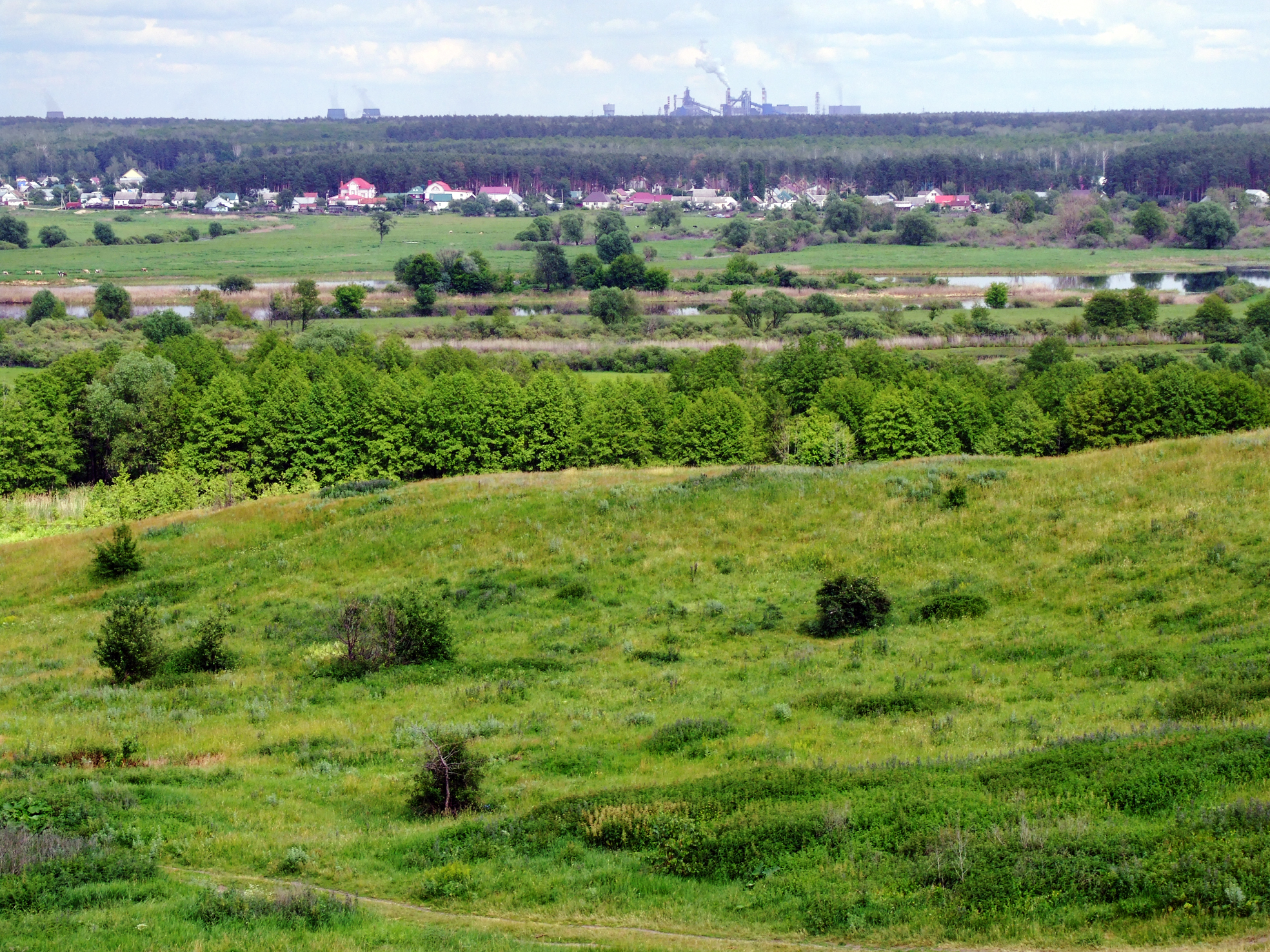
- Landscape in Lipetsky District

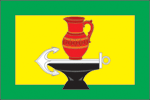
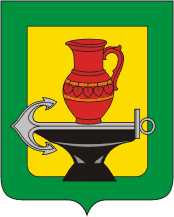
- Flag Coat of arms
- Location of Lipetsky District in Lipetsk Oblast
- Coordinates: 52°37′N 39°36′E
- Country: Russia
- Federal subject: Lipetsk Oblast
- Established: 30 July 1928
- Administrative center: Lipetsk

Area
  - Total: 1,510 km^{2} (580 sq mi)

Population (2010 Census)
  - Total: 49,258
  - Density: 32.6/km^{2} (84.5/sq mi)
  - Urban: 0%
  - Rural: 100%

Administrative structure
  - Administrative divisions: 21 selsoviet
  - Inhabited localities: 86 rural localities

Municipal structure
  - Municipally incorporated as: Lipetsky Municipal District
  - Municipal divisions: 0 urban settlements, 21 rural settlements
- Time zone: UTC+3 (MSK)
- OKTMO ID: 42640000
- Website: http://www.lipradm.ru

Lipetsky District (Russian: Ли́пецкий райо́н) is an administrative and municipal district (raion), one of the eighteen in Lipetsk Oblast, Russia. It is located in the center of the oblast. The area of the district is 1,510 square kilometers (580 sq mi). Its administrative center is the city of Lipetsk (which is not administratively a part of the district). Population: 59,655 (2021 census); 49,258 (2010 census); 48,383 (2002 Census); 48,223 (1989 Soviet census).

== Administrative and municipal status ==
Within the framework of administrative divisions, Lipetsky District is one of the eighteen in the oblast. The city of Lipetsk serves as its administrative center, despite being incorporated separately as a city under oblast jurisdiction—an administrative unit with the status equal to that of the districts.

As a municipal division, the district is incorporated as Lipetsky Municipal District. Lipetsk City Under Oblast Jurisdiction is incorporated separately from the district as Lipetsk Urban Okrug.
