= Yeletsky District =

Yeletsky District Елецкий район (Russian)
- District
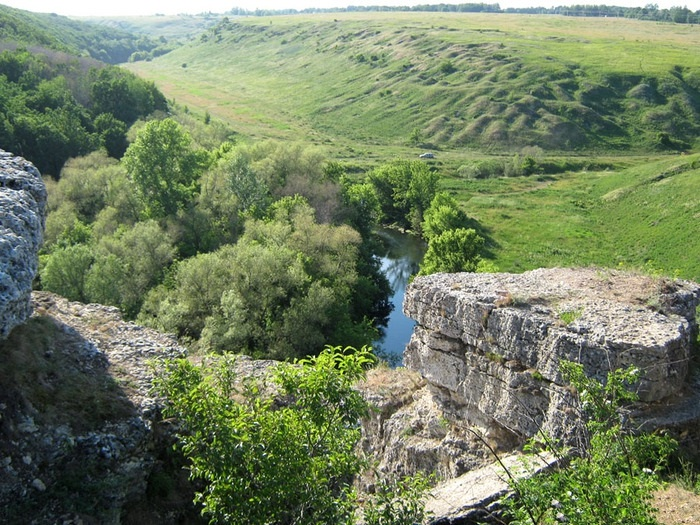
- Galichya Gora Nature Reserve, Yeletsky District

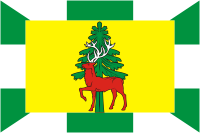
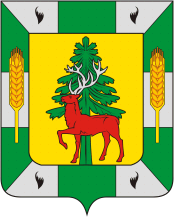
- Flag Coat of arms
- Location of Yeletsky District in Lipetsk Oblast
- Coordinates: 52°36′24″N 38°31′44″E
- Country: Russia
- Federal subject: Lipetsk Oblast
- Established: 10 July 1928
- Administrative center: Yelets

Area
  - Total: 1,170 km^{2} (450 sq mi)

Population (2010 Census)
  - Total: 30,130
  - Density: 25.8/km^{2} (66.7/sq mi)
  - Urban: 0%
  - Rural: 100%

Administrative structure
  - Administrative divisions: 15 selsoviet
  - Inhabited localities: 99 rural localities

Municipal structure
  - Municipally incorporated as: Yeletsky Municipal District
  - Municipal divisions: 0 urban settlements, 15 rural settlements
- Time zone: UTC+3 (MSK)
- OKTMO ID: 42621000
- Website: http://www.elradm.ru/

Yeletsky District (Russian: Еле́цкий райо́н) is an administrative and municipal district (raion), one of the eighteen in Lipetsk Oblast, Russia. It is located in the western central part of the oblast. The area of the district is 1,170 square kilometers (450 sq mi). Its administrative center is the city of Yelets (which is not administratively a part of the district). Population: 29,331 (2021 census); 30,130 (2010 census); 29,627 (2002 Census); 33,433 (1989 Soviet census).

== Administrative and municipal status ==
Within the framework of administrative divisions, Yeletsky District is one of the eighteen in the oblast. The city of Yelets serves as its administrative center, despite being incorporated separately as a city under oblast jurisdiction—an administrative unit with the status equal to that of the districts.

As a municipal division, the district is incorporated as Yeletsky Municipal District. Yelets City Under Oblast Jurisdiction is incorporated separately from the district as Yelets Urban Okrug.
