= Gryazinsky District =

Gryazinsky District Грязинский район (Russian)
- District
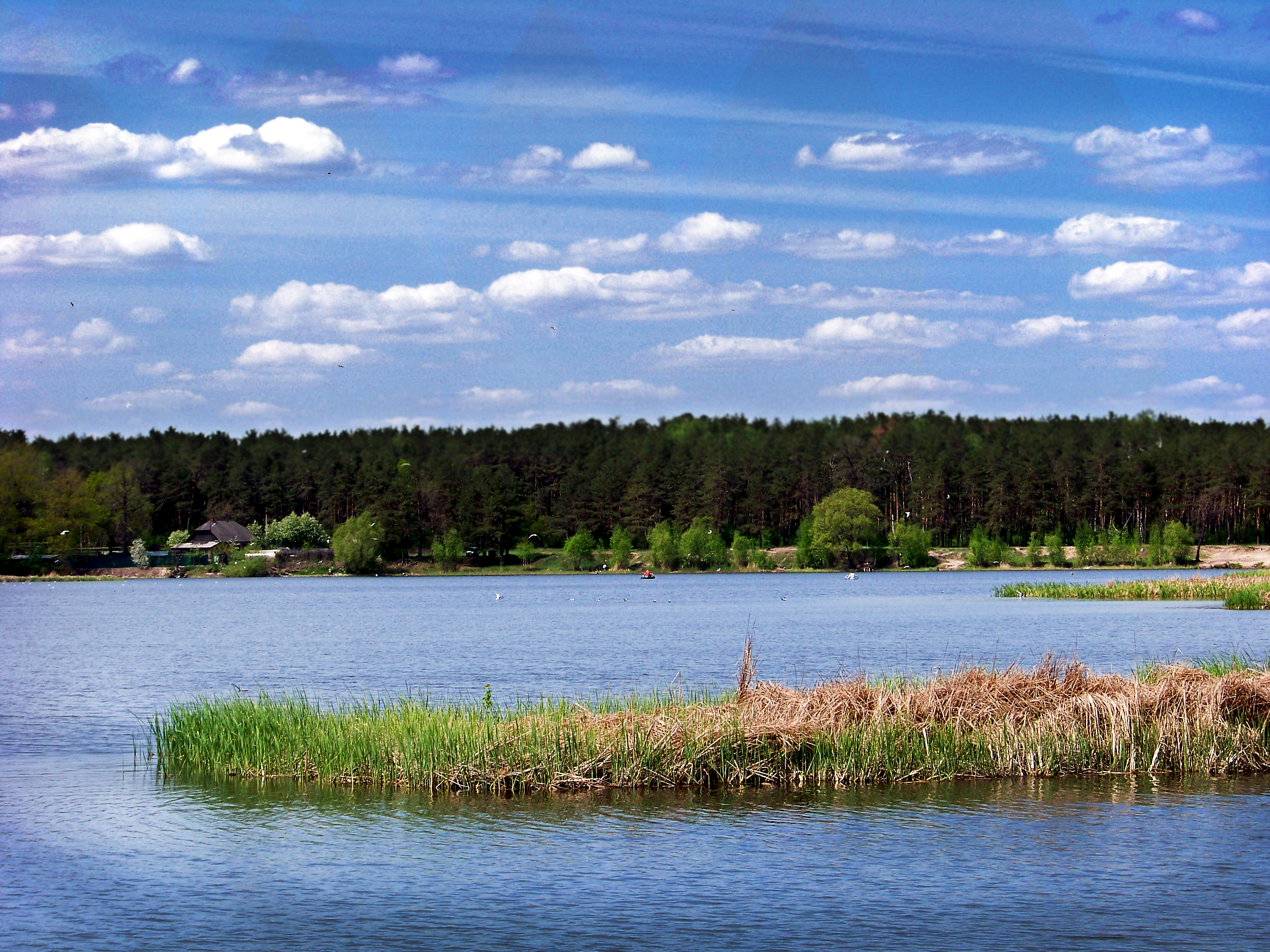
- Martyrskogo Reservoir, Gryazinsky District

- Flag Coat of arms
- Location of Gryazinsky District in Lipetsk Oblast
- Coordinates: 52°30′N 39°56′E
- Country: Russia
- Federal subject: Lipetsk Oblast
- Established: 30 July 1928
- Administrative center: Gryazi

Area
  - Total: 1,360 km^{2} (530 sq mi)

Population (2010 Census)
  - Total: 75,159
  - Density: 55.3/km^{2} (143/sq mi)
  - Urban: 62.3%
  - Rural: 37.7%

Administrative structure
  - Administrative divisions: 1 Towns under district jurisdiction, 16 Selsoviets
  - Inhabited localities: 1 cities/towns, 62 rural localities

Municipal structure
  - Municipally incorporated as: Gryazinsky Municipal District
  - Municipal divisions: 1 urban settlements, 16 rural settlements
- Time zone: UTC+3 (MSK)
- OKTMO ID: 42606000
- Website: http://www.gryazy.ru/

Gryazinsky District (Russian: Гря́зинский райо́н) is an administrative and municipal district (raion), one of the eighteen in Lipetsk Oblast, Russia. It is located in the southeast of the oblast. The area of the district is 1,360 square kilometers (530 sq mi). Its administrative center is the town of Gryazi. Population: 77,637 (2021 census); 75,159 (2010 census); 73,622 (2002 Census); 26,821 (1989 Soviet census). The population of Gryazi accounts for 56.6% of the district's total population.
