= Zadonsky =

Zadonsky (masculine), Zadonskaya (feminine), or Zadonskoye (neuter) may refer to:

- Zadonsky District, a district of Lipetsk Oblast, Russia
- Zadonsky (rural locality) (Zadonskaya, Zadonskoye), name of several rural localities in Russia

== See also ==
- Zadonsk
