= Sretensky Theological Academy =

Higher educational institution

- Сретенская духовная академия
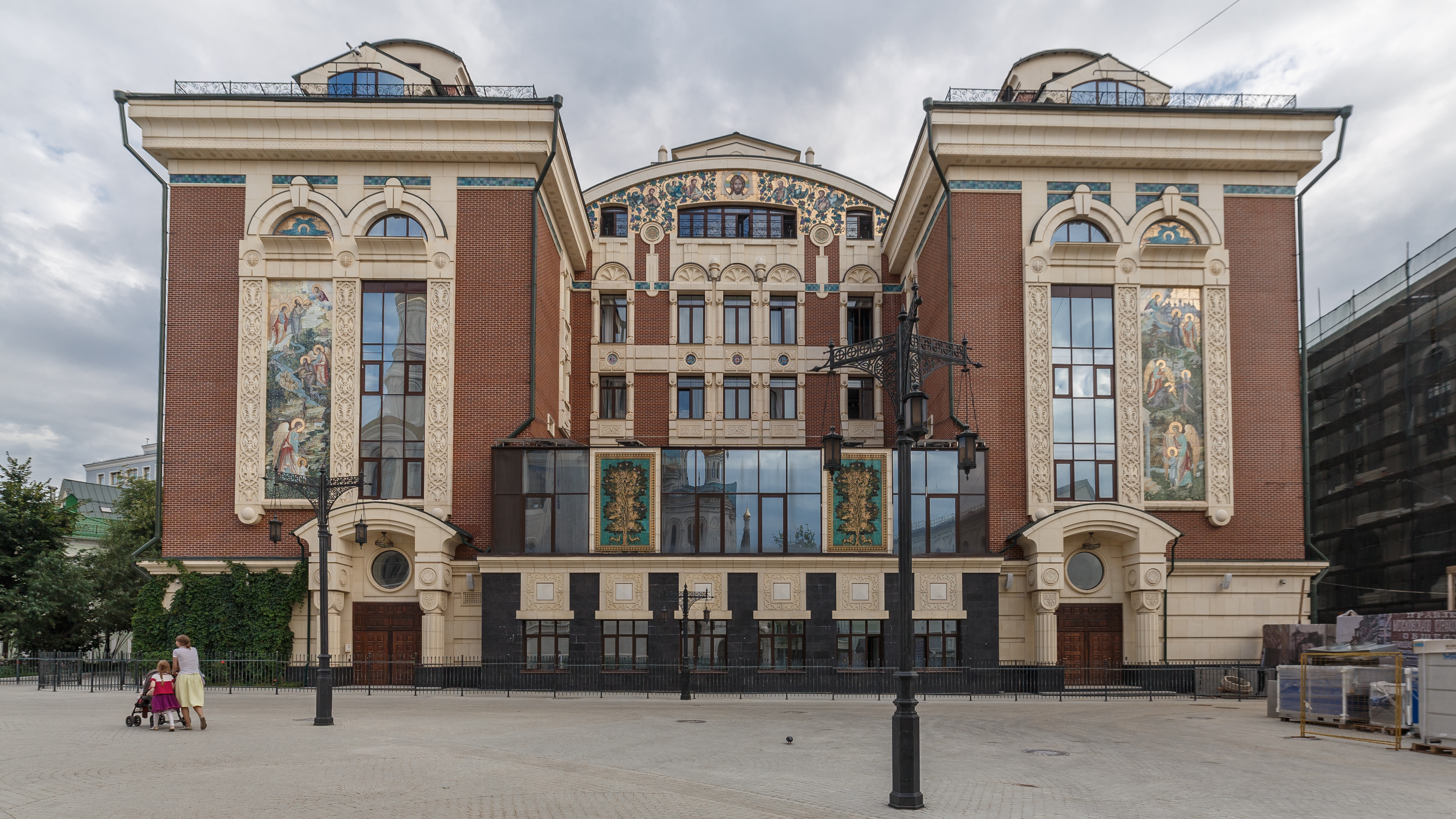
- Type: Theological College (1999-2002), Theological Seminary (2002-2021), Theological Academy (since 2021)
- Established: 15 July 1999
- Rector: John (Ludischev)
- Location: Moscow, Russia; 55.765339405°N 37.628780126°E
- Website: sdamp.ru

The Sretensky Theological Academy (Russian: Сретенская духовная академия) is a higher educational institution of the Russian Orthodox Church that trains Orthodox clergy. It is located on the territory of the Sretensky Monastery in the Sretensky District of Moscow. The academy has an extensive library (more than 40 thousand titles), which includes books of the 16th-19th centuries and a small archaeological museum (about 30 exhibits). There are electives for in-depth study of ancient languages (Ancient Greek, Biblical Hebrew, Latin).

== History ==
The abbot of the Sretensky Monastery, Moscow, Archimandrite Tikhon (Shevkunov), decided to establish the Sretensky Higher Orthodox Monastic School at the monastery: "The inhabitants gathered, mostly young people. Of course, they needed to be educated… Gradually, the idea was born... to create a monastic theological school. We assessed our capabilities, including financial ones, and I turned to Father John (Krestyankin) for a blessing. He was very pleased that we have such a desire and opportunity, and blessed us to create an educational institution within the walls of the Sretensky Monastery. Of course, the main blessing in this case was for the rector of our monastery, the late His Holiness Patriarch Alexy II." Classes began in October 1999. The first lecture was given by Doctor of Philology Alexander Uzhankov, it was devoted to Ancient Russian literature. The very first classes were held outside the walls of the monastery, in one of the buildings adjacent to the monastery. Later, when repairs were made in the fraternal monastic buildings, it became possible to arrange new premises for the seminary in them. Initially, the school did not have an official status: neither state nor ecclesiastical.

On December 26, 2002, it was transformed into a theological seminary. On April 13, 2021, it was transformed into a theological academy. On December 28, 2013, Patriarch of Moscow and all Rus', Kirill of Moscow, consecrated the new building of the Sretensky Seminary, equipped for teaching and living for students. Since May 19, 2018, the acting rector is Hieromonk Siluan (Nikitin). Since December 29, 2022, the rector of the academy is John (Ludischev).

== Rectors ==
- archimаndrite (later bishop) Tikhon (Shevkunov) (15 July 1999 - 19 May 2018)
- hieromonk Siluan (Nikitin) (May 19, 2018 - July 9, 2019) acting
- archbishop Ambrose (Yemakov) (July 9, 2019 - August 25, 2020) acting
- archpriest Maxim Kozlov (August 25, 2020 - June 17, 2021) acting
- archpriest Vadim Leonov (June 17, 2021 - December 29, 2022) acting
- hegumen John (Ludischev) (since December 29, 2022) acting until March 20, 2025
