= Pravoslavie.ru =

Russian Orthodox website

Pravoslavie.Ru
- Website type: Internet portal
- Available in: Russian, English, Serbian, Greek
- Creator: Tikhon (Shevkunov)
- Website: https://pravoslavie.ru
- Commercial: No
- Registration: None

Pravoslavie.ru is a Russian Orthodox information Internet portal. It was created on 29 December 1999 by the editors of Sretensky Monastery's Internet projects. It is run by the blessing of Patriarch Alexy II of Moscow of the Russian Orthodox Church. The site is considered a platform for presenting the moderate conservative views of the Russian Orthodox community.

Metropolitan Tikhon (Shevkunov) has been the site's editor-in-chief since its creation.

In addition to the main Russian-language version, the site administration launched versions in English, Serbian and Greek.

== History ==
The site was launched on 29 December 1999 and was originally called "Orthodoxy 2000". As Hieromonk Ignatius (Shestakov) recalled, "Before Pravoslavie.Ru, it seems, there was nothing useful at all. There were only a few weak church websites that almost nobody read. There were a couple of projects, but they had more of an oppositional character. Or there were libraries, but not a journal. <...> In those years we had a very right attitude from the very beginning: to write for everybody-believers and nonbelievers-to help people come to the Church.

In the winter of 2001, Pravoslavie.ru opened the project "Local Churches". The main goal of this project was to collect a database of the local Orthodox Churches on one information resource.

In the summer of 2004, the portal became a member of the Yandex.News affiliate program.

On 23 January 2006, it was announced that the portal Pravoslavie.Ru and the website "Orthodox Calendar" (days.ru) would unite. This event owed much to the preliminary work on the creation of the "Community of Orthodox Web Developers", of which both projects were among the initiators.

Pravoslavie.Ru took part in the first contest of Orthodox sites on Runet "Mrezha-2006," the jury of which was headed by the chief editor of the portal, Archimandrite Tikhon.

On 23 March 2006, on the eve of the opening of the IV All-Diaspora Council of the Russian Orthodox Church Abroad, which supported the restoration of the unity of the Local Russian Church, the website "Let us be of one mind" (pravos.org), which posted the most important documents on the relationship between the Moscow Patriarchate and the Russian Church Abroad, was launched. In fact, this website was an unofficial information resource of the Moscow Patriarchate Commission for Dialogue with the Russian Church Abroad and the Russian Church Abroad Commission for Negotiations with the Moscow Patriarchate, which drafted Act on Canonical Communion and the reunion procedure.

Since 2008, there has been a complete archive of materials for all years.

On 29 May 2008, to commemorate the 555th anniversary of the fall of Constantinople, the editors of the Internet projects of the Sretensky Monastery launched a thematic website, "Byzantine Lesson". The immediate reason for developing the site was the widespread media discussion of Father Tikhon's film "The death of an empire. Byzantine Lesson".

On 22 October 2008, in connection with the beginning of the "Days of Russia in Latin America", in which Sretensky Monastery took an active part, Pravoslavie.ru opened the official website of the choir of the Moscow Sretensky Monastery. The site was created in four languages: Russian, English, Spanish and Portuguese . (Note: The Russian and English versions are still available at the moment)

On 10 November 2010, it was announced that Pravoslavie.ru had registered on the social networks VKontakte, Facebook, Twitter and LiveJournal.

On 28 June 2011, the Serbian version of the portal was launched. The new project was launched on Vidovdan, a Serbian national holiday.

In 2013, the site was blocked in Uzbekistan, but the block was soon lifted.

On 23 November 2015, the new design of the portal with simplified access to materials, new headings and sections (including a media section) was announced. The new site has been designed with mobile devices in mind.

On 6 September 2019, the Greek version was launched.

== Recognition ==
On 17 January 2000, online directory @Rus named the Orthodoxy 2000 site "the best site for new additions."

In December 2003, journalist Ksenia Luchenko assessed the site as follows:

"At first it caused a cautious reaction from users because of its hurrah-patriotic and alarmist publications in the style of Russian House. However, in February 2001 the authors of the site supported the official position of the Synodal Biblical and Theological Commission on the issue of INN, and began to publish much more balanced and high-quality materials on other issues. Since then, "Pravoslavie.Ru" steadily occupies the top lines of ratings and has a reputation as the best expert Orthodox resource on Runet. In addition to news and comments on religious and social events, the site regularly publishes historical materials, articles on geopolitics, social issues and culture. Sermons by respected clergymen of the past and present, a "questions to the priest" section, publications by contemporary theologians, patrologists, and apologists, interviews by priests and public figures, and weekly press reviews-all this retains regular readers and attracts new ones."

In 2006, Pravoslavie.ru won fifth place in the popular vote at the Runet Prize, and later dropped out of the competition.

In 2020, Pravoslavie.Ru won the Prince Konstantin Ostrogsky Prize (Poland).

== Editorial board ==
- Metropolitan Tikhon (Shevkunov) is editor-in-chief;
- Anton Pospelov is the executive secretary;
- The Hieromonk Ignatius (Shestakov) — editor of the Serbian version of the site;
- Dmitry Tsypin is head of the Orthodox Calendar project.

In 2006-2011, Alexander Parmenov served as executive editor.

== Site statistics ==
About half a million unique addresses per month access the site. According to Rambler, Pravoslavie.ru remains the most read religious resource of Runet. According to Yandex, it is among the ten most cited resources of the Society section.

According to the 2011 survey "Who, How, and Why to Study the Orthodox World" conducted by the "Sreda" research service among 50 scholars of religion, Pravoslavie.ru was ranked third among the top five most visited websites by respondents.
