= Hilarion (Prikhodko) =

Russian priest

Archimandrite Ilarion (Russian: Иларио́н, 7 July [O.S. 24 June] 1924 – 29 May 2008) was a priest of the Russian Orthodox Church. He mostly served in Novgorod Oblast in the small village of Bronnitsa. There, he became widely known as a spiritual father, and many faithful attributed powers of clairvoyance and healing to him. The Russian Church is currently considering him for canonization.

== Biography ==
Fr. Ilarion was born as Ivan Fomich Prikhodko (Russian: Ива́н Фо́мич Прихо́дько) in the village of Alenovka in the Unechsky District, Bryansk Oblast. His parents Foma and Iuliana gave him and his two siblings a pious upbringing. The family worked the land until the Soviets dispossessed them in the drive to collectivize farming. The Germans took whatever was left after they occupied the territory during the Second World War. Young Ivan joined the army in 1943 and covertly practiced his faith. The horrors of war and a severe combat injury he suffered shook him to the core. In the hospital, after meeting two nuns of the Catacomb Church, he decided that he himself would become a monk. After the war, his mother blessed his new path; his father was deeply upset, but did not prevent Ivan from entering the monastery.

Ivan entered the Glinsk Hermitage, located in modern-day Ukraine, in 1950. The monastery, dedicated to the Nativity of the Mother of God, was founded in the 17th century and had a high spiritual reputation; St. Seraphim of Sarov called it “a great school of the spiritual life.” It was closed by the Soviets in 1922, but reopened in 1942. By the time the future Father Ilarion arrived, it was the only operating monastery in Russia. The monastery strictly operated according to the Athonite rule: all property was held in common, and no monk had personal possessions. Ivan developed spiritually from reading the works of the Church Fathers, following the rule of the monastery, and hearing the advice of the monastery's elders. In 1957, he was tonsured a monk with the new name of Ilarion, and two years later he became a hierodeacon. Even as a young deacon, people were beginning to come to him for spiritual advice.

Unfortunately, with the renewed religious persecution under Nikita Khrushchev, the Glinsk Hermitage was closed, and Fr. Ilarion had to leave the monastery. He served for several years in parishes in Belgorod Oblast, and was ordained to the priesthood in 1961. He attempted to study at Moscow Theological Academy, and then join the brotherhood of the Pskov-Caves Monastery, but failed both times due to government restrictions. He then successfully applied to the Leningrad Theological Academy, where he studied from 1963 to 1967, earning a doctorate in theology. As a student, he sought the spiritual counsel of Archimandrite John (Krestiankin) of the Pskov Monastery, and considered him his spiritual father for forty years until Fr. John's death in 2006. After graduation, Fr. Ilarion stayed at the academy for some years as a lecturer, and then attempted to join the brotherhood of the Trinity-Sergius Lavra. Due to his refusal to register with the government, however, he had to leave the monastery.

In 1973, Fr. Ilarion (now elevated to hegumen) began serving in Novgorod Oblast. He briefly served in a church in Novgorod, but was soon transferred to the Church of the Transfiguration in the village of Bronnitsa. He remained at Bronnitsa for the rest of his life, serving at the parish for over thirty years. Father Ilarion revived the spiritual life of Bronnitsa and the surrounding area, and had many devoted spiritual children. He eventually became the designated confessor for all the priests of the Novgorod Diocese. He was also known for his strong powers of prayer, as well as of clairvoyance and healing. He also had a special desire to visit the Holy Land and after finally making a pilgrimage there in 1999 wrote a book about his experiences entitled In the Promised Land. In his last years he suffered a decline in health, and reposed in 2008. After his death, all the clergy of the Novgorod Diocese served at his funeral, and thousands grieved. He was buried at the Khutyn Monastery. Archimandrite Ilarion is now considered a candidate for canonization by the Russian Orthodox Church.
