= Everyday Saints and Other Stories =

2011 book by the Archimandrite Tikhon

- Front page of Everyday Saints and Other Stories
- Author: Archimandrite Tikhon
- Language: Russian
- Genre: Prose
- Publication date: 2011
- Publication place: Russia
- Media type: Print
- Pages: 640
- ISBN: 978-0-9842848-3-2

Everyday Saints and Other Stories (Russian: «Несвятые святые» и другие рассказы) is a book by the Russian author Archimandrite Tikhon (now the Metropolitan), published in 2011. It is a bestseller, and over 1.1 million copies in Russian have been sold. Its translator Julian Henry Lowenfeld was baptized into the Orthodox faith that same year, on Holy Saturday, in Moscow's Sretensky Monastery, where Archimandrite Tikhon was hegumen at the time.

At the beginning of 2019, more than 3 million copies had already been sold in Russia. The English translation of the book was the subject of an event held in the Diplomatic Receptions Hall at Russia's Consulate General in Manhattan. A few days earlier there was a presentation of the book in the Library of Congress.

The book has been translated into more than 17 languages, including French, Chinese, Serbian and others.

The book describes life in the Pskov-Caves Monastery, as well as other noteworthy stories from the lives of ordinary people.

== Awards and honors ==
It was awarded the Book of the Year prize for 2012 in Moscow.

Its English translation won a first prize at New York's Read Russia 2012 Festival.
