= Maria Perveeva =

Russian teacher and politician

Member of the Constituent Assembly
- In office 1918
- Constituency: Voronezh

Personal details
- Born: 1879 Zadonsk, Russian Empire

Maria Dmitrievna Perveeva (Russian: Мария Дмитриевна Первеева, born 1879) was a Russian teacher and politician. In 1917 she was one of the ten women elected to the Constituent Assembly, the country's first female parliamentarians.

== Biography ==
Perveeva was born in Zadonsk in 1879. She trained to be a teacher and became involved in self-education, but was arrested in 1894 and 1901 for her activities. After being arrested again in 1904, she was freed from jail by local peasants. In 1905 she co-founded a group of revolutionaries in Valuysky District, which organised illegal meetings. She also joined the Socialist Revolutionary Party and became a member of the provincial committee in Voronezh Governorate. After another arrest, she briefly emigrated, but returned to Russia in 1907. However, she was arrested and sentenced to hard labour, spending ten years in prison in Irkutsk.

Following the start of the Russian Revolution, in 1917 she was a Socialist-Revolutionary candidate in Voronezh in the Constituent Assembly elections, and was one of ten women elected to the legislature. After the establishment of the Soviet Union, she became a member of the Society of Former Political Prisoners and Exiled Settlers, and worked in an artel in Khosta. In 1937 she was sentenced to eight years in a labour camp by the Krasnodar Krai branch of the NKVD; she was rehabilitated in 1963.
