= Interfax-Religion =

Russian religious news service

Интерфакс-Религия
- Available in: Russian and English
- Founded: December 20, 2004
- Dissolved: December 2022
- Country of origin: Russia
- Owner: Interfax
- Website: http://www.interfax-religion.ru/
- Commercial: Yes

Interfax-Religion was a Russian information web-portal, a division of Interfax News agency. This Internet resource was launched on December 20, 2004 with the support of the Interreligious Council of Russia. The editor-in-chief is Valentina Trubetskaya.

== History ==
Interfax-Religion website appeared after Archpriest Vsevolod Chaplin reached an agreement with Interfax to create a specialized portal dedicated to religion. In October 2009 Olga Gumanova, a freelance correspondent for Interfax-Religion, investigating the situation around the orphanage at Bogolyubsky nunnery in Vladimir region, where several female inmates escaped, was brutally beaten and threatened. The girl was not robbed, despite having money, gold jewelry and a cell phone with her.

In December 2010 the Interfax-Religion website was subjected to a nighttime DDoS and shut down, but was later restored.

In October 2014 Interfax-Religion was included in blacklist of 50 websites banned by the Communications Service under the Government of Tajikistan, and was blocked and unblocked several times by local internet providers and cellular operators. According to human rights defenders, it was related to the actions of the opposition.

== Content ==
=== News ===
The portal contains free access full-text versions of news about Religion in Russia religious life in Russia and abroad in Russian and English. There is also free access to the archive of Interfax religious news since 1989. The most important news items are published on the main feed of the agency and are included in its paid newsletter, which reaches an audience of approximately 20,000 subscribers around the world.

The newsfeed can be customized individually, automatically selecting materials by type, topic and geographical coverage – for example, only about Orthodoxy in Ukraine or only about Islam in Bashkiria.

=== Proportions ===
The share of news about a particular religious organization in the general news stream should correspond to the number of its adherents and its influence in society – this is the principle declared by the editorial board of the portal. All the news on the portal is divided into streams by headings as follows.:

- Orthodoxy
- Islam
- Judaism
- Buddhism
- Catholicism and Protestantism
- National religions
- New religious movements
- Atheism and secularism
- Dialog

The site presents exclusive interviews and analysis, as well as the results of thematic monitoring of the central, regional and religious printed and electronic media, including Internet resources, television-and radio broadcasts, devoted to religious life.

In addition, there is a special section "Memorable Dates", which indicates the largest religious holidays and the main biographical milestones of the leading spiritual leaders of Russia, close and far abroad countries. There are also "Reference materials", including biographies of significant persons, statistical data on confessions and others.

In December 2009, a joint project of Interfax-Religion portal and Moscow State Linguistic University was launched. (MSLU) – a weekly updated interactive map of 25 thousand religious communities in Russia, their exact names, locations and other information, classified into 12 categories.

== Reviews ==
Candidate of Philological Sciences, Associate Professor at the Department of Political and Public Communications at the RankhigS and journalist Ksenia Luchenko wrote in 2020 that Interfax-Religion "'for years has been the most operative, as if independent and yet personally affiliated with Chaplin, source of information about church affairs'." Luchenko also wrote that any representative of the Russian Orthodox Church, including ordinary priests, deacons, or bishops, used to present the portal's headline news as the opinion of the entire ROC ("'The ROC believes...'" or "'The ROC has criticized...'").

=== Positives ===
Patriarch of Moscow and All Russia Kirill:

I recall with pleasure how in 2004, with the support of the Interreligious Council of Russia, we created the Interfax-Religion portal, which became one of the largest information resources dedicated to news and analytics in the religious sphere. During this time, it has become a reliable reference point for those who are looking for truthful information about events in the life of the Russian Orthodox Church and other traditional communities.

Papal Nuncio in Russia Antonio Mennini:

Interfax-Religion is a reliable source of facts and objective comments.

Chief Rabbi of Russia Berl Lazar:

I cannot fail to note the excellent work of the Interfax-Religion news service, which over the years of its existence has become one of the world's most authoritative sources of information about the life of believers in Russia, including about our community. Your work is very much needed by people in Russia and abroad. You are fulfilling your journalistic duty at the highest professional level.

Chairman of the Central Spiritual Administration of Muslims, Supreme Mufti of Russia, Sheikh al-Islam Talgat Tajuddin:

Your outreach ministry keeps millions of people in the know. On behalf of the multi-representative flock of the CSDUM of Russia, we congratulate IA Interfax on the 25th anniversary and Interfax-Religion on the 10th anniversary of professional activity, and also sincerely thank you for the timely coverage of news, in particular, the work of the CSDUM of Russia.

=== Criticism ===
Chair of the Spiritual Administration of Muslims of Chuvashia Airat Khaibulov:

The Interfax-Religion website has a biased attitude towards Islam and false information in many cases. It often happened that the information presented on this site was not 100 percent true. What coverage of events in the Muslim community are they talking about? There is no this. When non-specialists get down to business, and even more so in the media, one-sided or unreliable information is obtained. I believe that this is unprofessional, people are incompetent in many matters of religion, especially when it comes to Islam.

Doctor of Historical Sciences, Corresponding Member of the Russian Academy of Sciences, Orientalist, Member of the Scientific Council of the Russian Council on International Affairs Vitaly Naumkin:

I am not inclined to exaggerate the scale of Islamophobia, but the fact that this site is oversaturated with negative information about certain kinds of Islamic movements, squabbles, etc., certainly creates a negative image of the Muslim community. To put an end to this, it is necessary to create a powerful information curtain, publish more positive materials.

Religious scholar, sociologist of religion, publicist and journalist Roman Lunkin, in a publication on the website of the Slavic Legal Center, accuses the portal of violating journalistic ethics and hooliganism. Lunkin calls the portal "pro-patriarchal", "Orthodox in orientation", and states that the portal is an agent of the ideological influence of the " Union of Orthodox Citizens " represented by its founder Kirill Frolov.

== See also ==
- NEWSru
- Nezavisimaya Gazeta
- Aleksandr Shchipkov
