= Tikhon of Zadonsk =

Russian bishop and spiritual writer

Saint Tikhon of Zadonsk
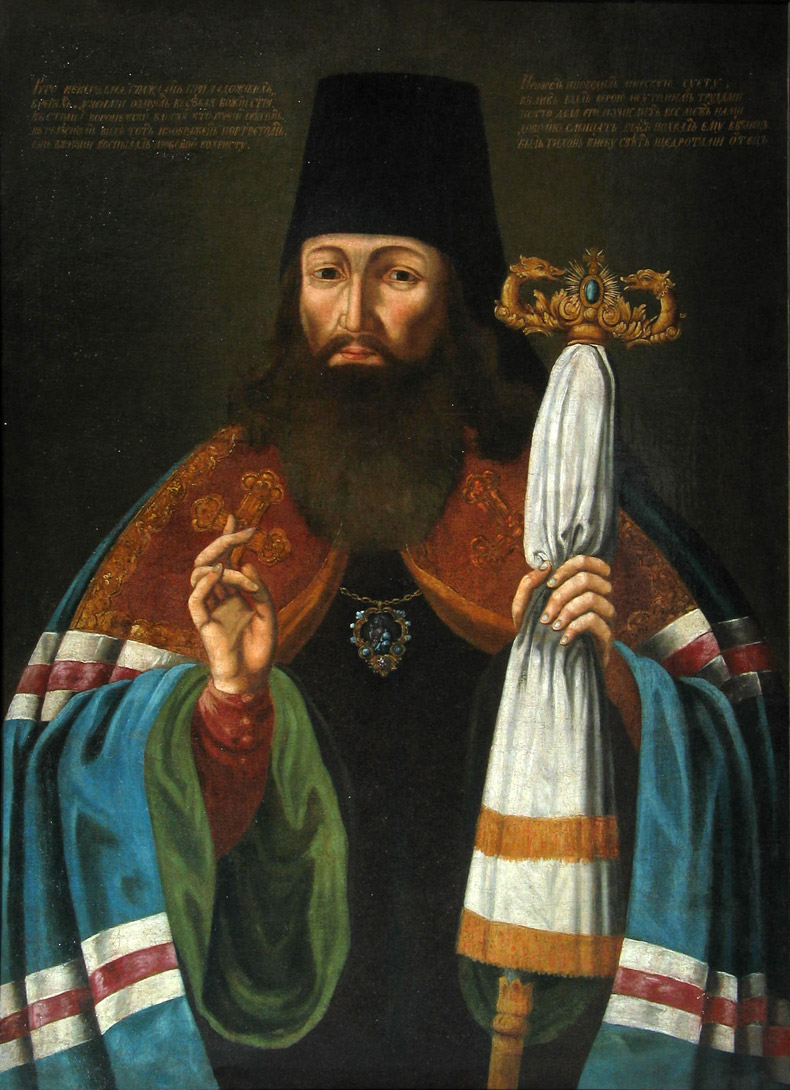
- Late 18th-century portrait

Bishop of Voronezh, Wonderworker of All Russia
- Born: 1724; Korotsko
- Died: 1783; Zadonsk
- Venerated in: Eastern Orthodox Church
- Canonized: 1861 by Holy Governing Synod of the Russian Orthodox Church
- Feast: August 13 (Repose); May 14 (Uncovering of Relics)
- Attributes: Vested as a bishop, often holding a Gospel Book or scroll, with his right hand raised in blessing
- Patronage: monks and clergy, missionaries, seminary students, sick people

Tikhon of Zadonsk (secular name Timofey Savelyevich Sokolov, Russian: Тимофей Савельевич Соколов; 1724–1783) was an 18th-century Russian Orthodox bishop and spiritual writer whom the Eastern Orthodox Church glorified (canonized) as a saint in 1861.

St. Tikhon was born in Novgorod, Russia, and grew up in extreme poverty. After spending much of his childhood working at peasant labour, he entered the Novgorod Seminary on a grant and was a brilliant student: he went on to teach Greek, Rhetoric and Philosophy at the seminary. He became a monk in 1758, and in 1763 was appointed Bishop of Voronezh, where he became revered for his energetic commitment to the spiritual education and wellbeing of both the laity and the clergy of his diocese. Due to ill health, he retired to the monastery at Zadonsk in 1769, where he lived until his death in 1783. At Zadonsk he wrote a number of luminous books and treatises, and became a much-loved spiritual advisor and man of God.

The life and works of Tikhon inspired Dostoevsky, who reflected them in the character of Bishop Tikhon in the novel Demons (1871–1872) and in the characters of Alyosha Karamazov and of the Elder Zosima in The Brothers Karamazov (1879–1880).

== Biography ==
Tikhon was born Timofey Kirillov in 1724 in the village of Korotsko, in the Novgorod region of Russia. When still an infant, he was given a new family name, Sokolov, by the head of the Novgorod Theological Seminary. Tikhon lived with his mother in extreme poverty, and was required to do peasant labour for long hours as a child. At the age of thirteen he was sent to a clergy school, and paid his way by working with the vegetable gardeners. At sixteen, he entered Novgorod Seminary under a state grant and excelled at his studies. In 1754, he became a teacher at the seminary, first in Greek, and later in Rhetoric and Philosophy. He took monastic vows with the name Tikhon in 1758.

On 13 May 1761 he was ordained a bishop of Kexholm and Ladoga, vicar bishop of the Diocese of Novgorod. On 3 February 1763 he was transferred to the Diocese of Voronezh. As Bishop he sought to revitalise the spiritual life of the cathedral and the community. He encouraged and instructed the clergy in their spiritual duties, formed a Mission to restore sectarians to Orthodoxy, turned judicial administration towards correction rather than punishment, and defended subordinates from secular authorities. He promoted education among the people, and transformed the Slavic-Latin school into a seminary, for which he developed the curriculum and assembled a staff of experienced instructors. Above all he sought to restore faith and enthusiasm for the spiritual life to both the monasteries and the people, through both preaching and writing. He wrote a treatise "On the Seven Holy Mysteries" designed to give clergy an understanding of the sacraments they performed, and another "On the Mystery of Holy Repentance" in which he offers a guide to spiritual advisors on receiving confession. He wrote a long essay entitled "Flesh and Spirit", fifteen articles of exhortation to the monks, and a number of special essays for the people sent to all the churches. Tikhon served as bishop for nearly five years, before requesting dismissal due to ill health. He at first settled at the Tolshevsky monastery near Voronezh before retiring to the monastery of Zadonsk in 1769, where he lived until his death in 1783.

At Zadonsk, Tikhon engaged in theological studies and writing, and adopted a strict ascetic life: despite his frail health he ate very little and often engaged in hard physical work. He was, however, indulgent to others' weaknesses, and was known for his deep humility and forgiveness, though he was himself naturally of a nervous and oversensitive temperament. Despite his erudition, he took lessons in spirituality from simple and illiterate monastic elders. In Zadonsk, Tikhon's reputation for piety, humility, kindness and wisdom drew many people to the monastery in search of his blessing and advice. He was not averse to leaving the monastery and moving among the local people if a situation required it, and would occasionally travel to more distant destinations.

Tikhon's two major literary works during his retirement were the books A Spiritual Treasury Gathered from the World (1770) and On True Christianity (1776). He also wrote shorter works especially for monks, such as "Rules of Monastic Life" and "Instruction to those who turn from the vain world". His own life at the monastery was described in some detail by two of his cell attendants.

On May 14, 1846, during the construction of the new cathedral at Zadonsk, Tikhon's relics were uncovered. His relics were rumoured to be incorrupt, and there were numerous reports of miracles occurring near them. The Russian Orthodox Church made Tikhon a saint in 1861. His feast day is celebrated on August 13, Julian calendar (August 26, Gregorian Calendar). Another feast day, the Uncovering of the Relics of Saint Tikhon of Zadonsk, was instituted to be celebrated annually on May 14.

== Character ==
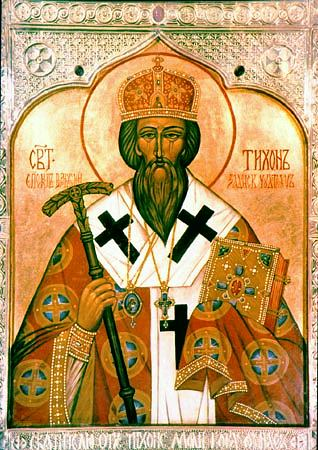
Old Russian icon of St. Tikhon.

St. Tikhon studied and taught in the Latin schools at Novgorod and Tver. Though primarily influenced by the Church Fathers, he also appreciated some modern western theologians, particularly Johann Arndt. Tikhon's chief work On True Christianity (Об истинном христианстве, Ob istinnom khristianstve) bore the same title as Arndt's principal work. Tikhon was exceptionally gifted with words and had a writing style that was artistic, simple, and "surprisingly limpid". Theologian Georges Florovsky describes Tikhon thus:

His grace and lucidity, his freedom—and not merely freedom from the world but also in the world—is the most striking quality in St. Tikhon's personality. He has the easy grace of a pilgrim or traveler neither deflected nor restrained by this world. "Every living being on earth is a wayfarer." However, this conquering grace was achieved through painful trial and ascetic effort. The dark waves of deep weariness and despair are quite clearly visible in Tikhon's limpid spirit as they rush over him... His peculiar subjective despair, his special temptation to melancholy as a form of uncustomary disclosure of the soul, is wholly unique in Russian asceticism and more readily suggestive of the Dark Night of the Soul by St. John of the Cross. At times Tikhon would fall into a helpless torpor, confinement, and immobility, when everything around him was dark, empty, and unresponsive. Sometimes he could not compel himself to leave his cell; at other times he seemingly tried to escape physically from despair by moving about. Tikhon's whole spirit had been overwhelmed in this ordeal, yet that trial left no traces or scars. The original luminosity of his soul was only purified in his personal progress.

Though Tikhon chose an ascetic life, he remained a pastor and a teacher, and did not refrain from actively involving himself in affairs of the world if his deep sensitivity to suffering was aroused. He was one of the first men of God to encounter the effects of the new Russian atheism, and this encounter is reflected in his writings and in anecdotes about him. He frequently intervened on behalf of mistreated peasants and sought to practice and promote Christian love in a time of darkness. On occasion he was physically attacked by landowners under the influence of the prevailing Voltairian antireligious ideas, but his strength and humility in these situations was said to be powerful enough to produce a change of heart in his assailant. He is reported by his monk-servant to have frequently engaged in ecstatic speech, but at other times to have become "lost in thought", whereupon he would retreat into solitude and prayer.

According to Florovsky, St. Tikhon "combined an intense concentration of the spirit with an exceptional capacity for tenderness and love." Florovsky describes Tikhon's books, particularly On True Christianity, as graceful, poetic and free, "less a dogmatic system than a book of mystical ethics", and the first attempt at a living theology, "a theology based on experience, in contrast and as a counterweight to scholastic erudition, which lacks any such experience."

== Influence ==
Russian author Fyodor Dostoevsky admired Tikhon, and was influenced by aspects of both his teaching and his character. A character called Tikhon plays a vital role in the controversial chapter "Stavrogin's Confession" (or "At Tikhon's") in Demons. The character is a former bishop living at a monastery, who suffers from a number of physical and nervous ailments but nonetheless demonstrates a profoundly compassionate insight into the state of mind of his interlocutor, the deeply troubled Nikolay Stavrogin. The teachings of the Elder, Zosima, in The Brothers Karamazov, are based on some of Tikhon's teachings, and constitute Dostoevsky's attempt to provide a truly Christian response to the materialistic, rationalistic, and nihilistic doctrines that were becoming increasingly dominant in Russian society at the time. Tikhon's re-affirmation of the doctrine of the immortality of the soul, and his lament for the moral and spiritual decay following from its rejection, is echoed in the novel. Like Dostoevsky, Tikhon connected the Resurrection with the creation of Heaven on Earth through Love, and not with the ideas of retribution and punishment contained in The Last Judgment:

How wonderful everything would be if everyone loved one another! Then there would be no robbery, no deceit, no murder... the jails would not be overflowing with prisoners, locked up for crimes, moneylending, failure to pay debts; there would finally be no poor or needy any longer, but all would be equal."

== Sayings ==
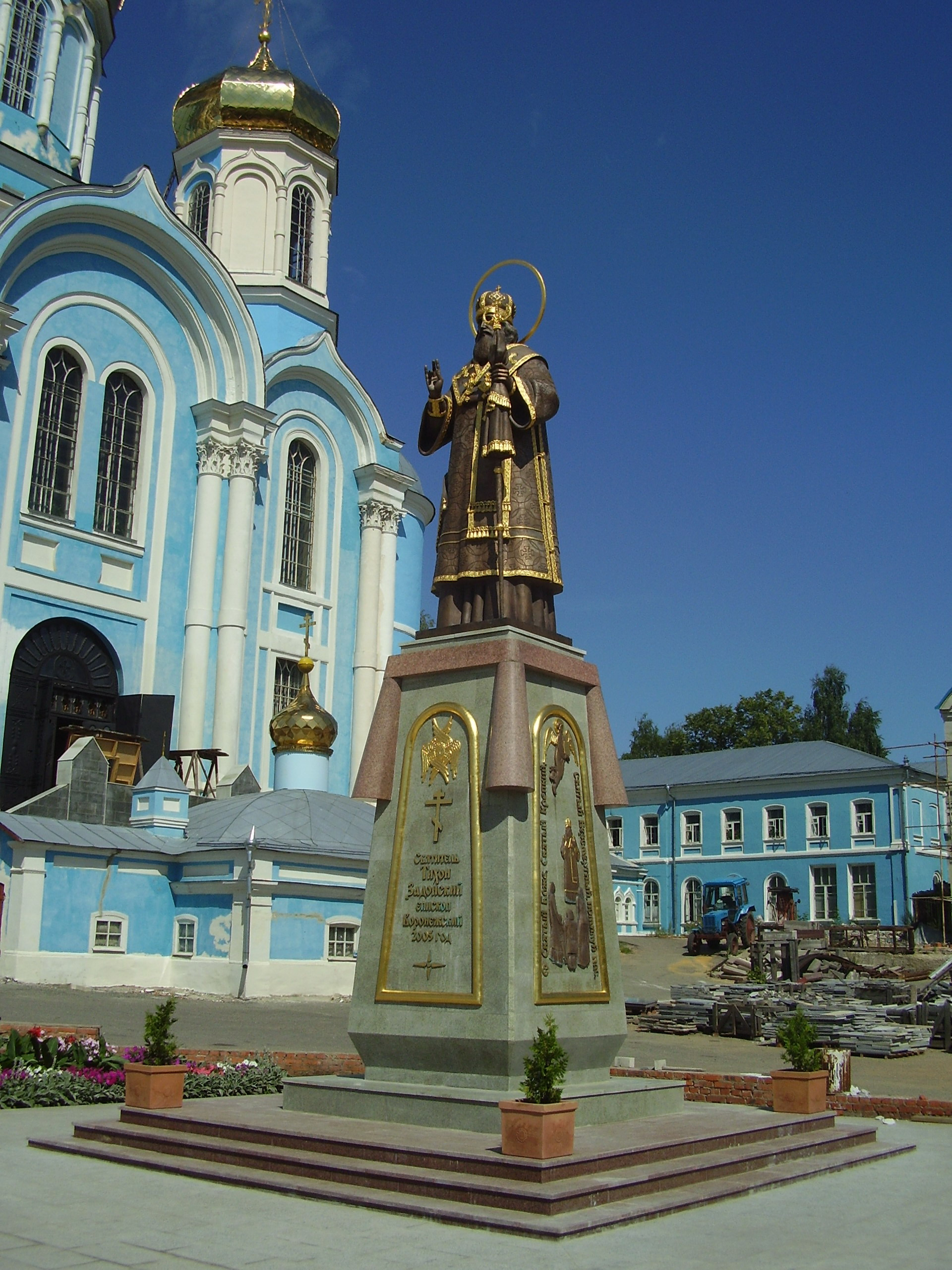
Monument to Tikhon in Zadonsk (sculptors I. P. Dikunov and E. N. Pak)

"Forgiveness is better than revenge."

"Love is higher than fasting".

"Try to know yourself, your own wickedness. Think on the greatness of God and your wretchedness. Meditate on the suffering of Christ, the magnitude of Whose love and suffering surpass our understanding. Ascribe the good that you do to God alone. Do not think about the sin of a brother but about what in him is better than in yourself .... Flee from glory, honors and praise, but if this is impossible, be sorry that such is your lot. Be benevolent to people of low origin. Be freely and willingly obedient not only to those above you but to those below .... The lowlier we are in spirit, the better we know ourselves, and without humility we cannot see God."

"Just as the body has an ear, so also does the soul. Not everybody has an ear that is open, nor does every soul. God commands the soul: do not kill, do not steal, do not commit adultery, turn away from evil and do good, etc. The soul whose ears are open, hears and listens to God speaking and does what God commands. Truly, such a soul cannot but hear God and obey His commandments if it has its ears open. Men listen and carry out the commands of earthly kings and lesser authorities, and will not a soul listen to God speaking if it has its ears open? Of course! And with what fervor and delight will it not listen and say to Him: Ready is my heart, O God, ready is my heart". (Ps. 108, Septuagint)

"For love does not seek its own, it labors, sweats, watches to build up the brother: nothing is inconvenient to love, and by the help of God it turns the impossible into the possible .... Love believes and hopes .... It is ashamed of nothing. Without it, what is the use of prayer? What use are hymns and singing? What is the use of building and adorning churches? What is mortification of the flesh if the neighbor is not loved? Indeed, all are of no consequence .... As an animal cannot exist without bodily warmth, So no good deed can be alive without true love; it is only the pretence of a good deed."

== Published works ==
- St. Tikhon of Zadonsk Journey to Heaven: Counsels on the Particular Duties of Every Christian, translated by Fr. George D. Lardas. (Jordanville, NY: Printshop of St. Job of Pochaev, 1991). ISBN 0-88465-046-4
- St. Tikhon of Voronezh, Wonderworker of Zadonsk On True Christianity Volume I, translated by Marianna Lilley. (Waynesboro, VA: Old Paths Press, 2020). ISBN 978-0-578-23520-2
- St. Tikhon of Voronezh, Wonderworker of Zadonsk On True Christianity Volume II, translated by Marianna Lilley. (Waynesboro, VA: Old Paths Press, 2020). ISBN 978-0-578-23862-3
- St. Tikhon of Voronezh, Wonderworker of Zadonsk On True Christianity Volume III, translated by Marianna Lilley. (Waynesboro, VA: Old Paths Press, 2020). ISBN 978-0-578-24375-7
- St. Tikhon of Voronezh, Wonderworker of Zadonsk On True Christianity Volume IV, translated by Marianna Lilley. (Waynesboro, VA: Old Paths Press, 2021). ISBN 978-1-7369836-0-7
- St. Tikhon of Voronezh, Wonderworker of Zadonsk On True Christianity Volume V, translated by Marianna Lilley. (Waynesboro, VA: Old Paths Press, 2021). ISBN 978-1-7369836-1-4
- St. Tikhon of Voronezh, Wonderworker of Zadonsk On True Christianity Volume VI, translated by Marianna Lilley. (Waynesboro, VA: Old Paths Press, 2021). ISBN 978-1-7369836-2-1
- St. Tikhon of Zadonsk Flesh & Spirit, translated by Marianna Lilley. (Waynesboro, VA: Old Paths Press, 2022). ISBN 978-1-7369836-5-2
- St. Tikhon of Zadonsk The Cell Letters, translated by Marianna Lilley. (Waynesboro, VA: Old Paths Press, 2022). ISBN 978-1-7369836-4-5
- St. Tikhon of Zadonsk A Treasury of Spiritual Riches, translated by Seraphim F. Englehardt. (Jordanville, NY: Holy Trinity Publications, 2023). ISBN 978-0884654827

== Sources ==
- Gorodetzky, Nadejda (1976). Saint Tikhon of Zadonsk: Inspirer of Dostoevsky. Crestwood, N.Y.: St. Vladamir's Seminary Press.
- Гавриил (Мельников), иером. (2023). Богословие святителя Тихона Задонского и его западный источник : проблематика, рецепция, интерпретация : монография. М.: ИНФРА-М. ISBN 978-5-16-018302-2.
