= Pskov-Caves Monastery =

Monastery in Pskov Oblast, Russia

Coordinates: 57°48′35″N 27°36′55″E

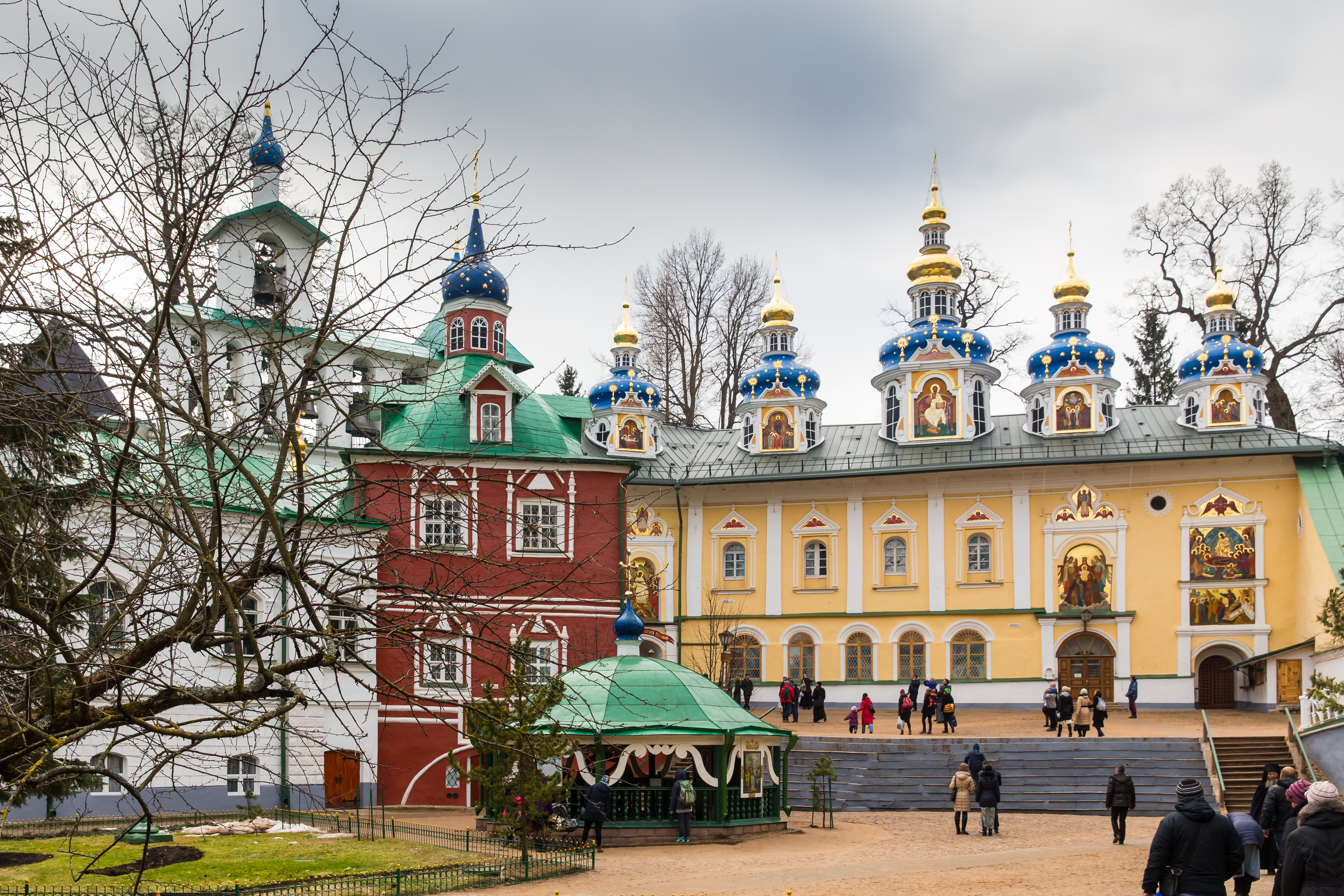
The katholikon

Pskov-Pechory Monastery or The Pskovo-Pechersky Dormition Monastery or Pskovo-Pechersky Monastery (Russian: Пско́во-Печ́ерский Успе́нский монасты́рь, Estonian: Petseri klooster) is a Russian Orthodox male monastery, located in Pechory, Pskov Oblast in Russia, just a few kilometers from the Estonian border. Pskov-Caves Monastery is one of the few Russian monasteries that have never been closed at any point in their existence, including during World War II and the Soviet regime. The monastery has been an important spiritual centre for the Seto people.

== History ==
The monastery was founded in the mid-15th century, when the first hermits settled in local caves. The first cave Church of the Dormition of the Theotokos (церковь Успения Богородицы) was built in 1473 (its modern facade was constructed in the 18th century).

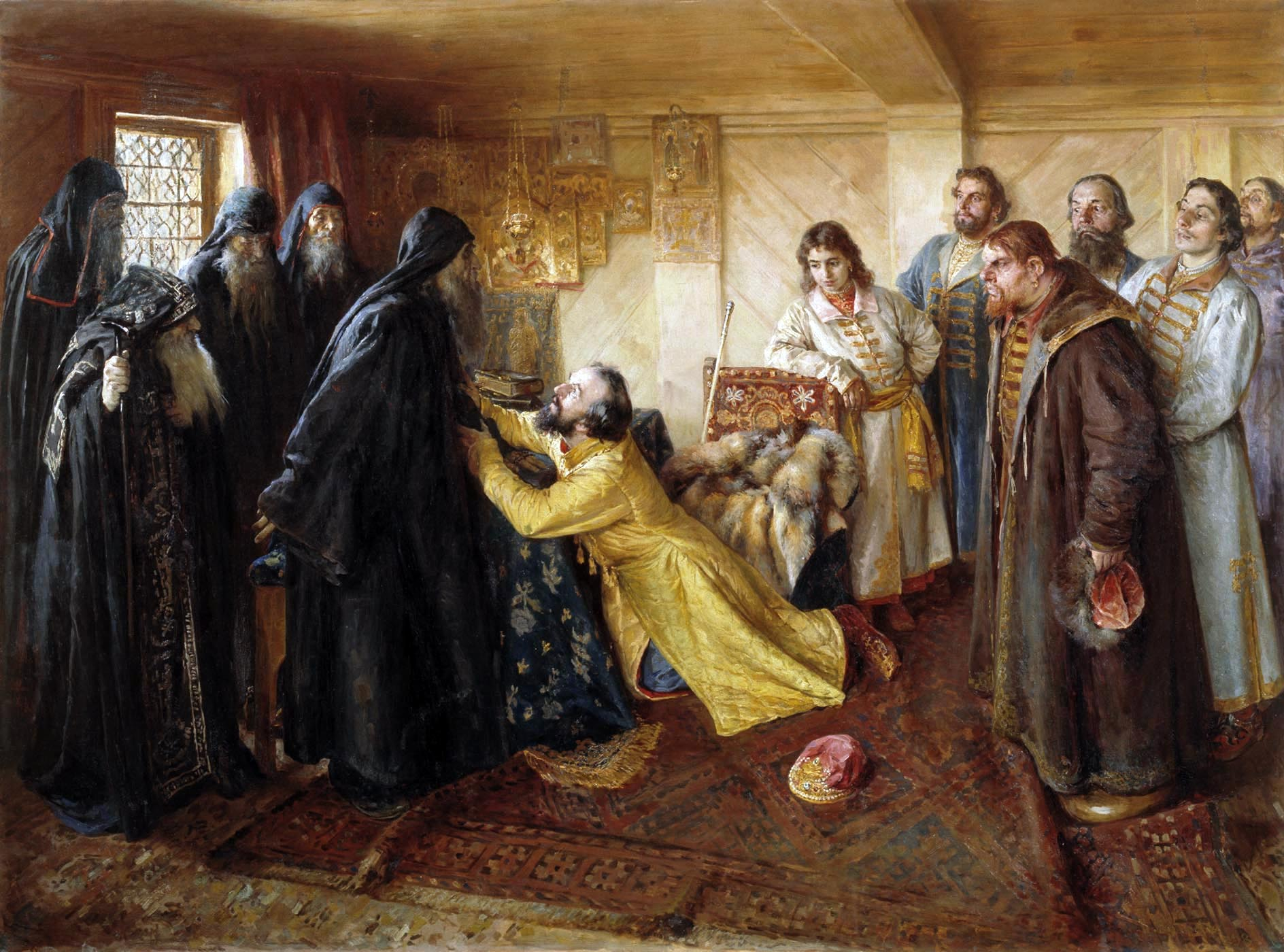
Ivan the Terrible's repentance: he asks the hegumen (father superior) Cornelius of the Pskovo-Pechorsky Monastery to let him take the tonsure at his monastery. Painting by Klavdy Lebedev.

After the monastery had been destroyed by the Livonian feudals, it was rebuilt by a Pskovian dyak Mikhail Munekhin-Misyur in 1519. A posad (settlement) was built next to the monastery, which would later grow into a town. In 1550s-1560s, Pskovo-Pechorsky Monastery and its posad were surrounded by a wall with towers (eventually, these fortifications were rebuilt in 1701).

The monastery became an important outpost for defending the western border of Russia. In 1581–1582, it withstood the siege laid by Stefan Batory’s army. In 1611–1616, the monastery repelled the attack of the Polish army led by Jan Karol Chodkiewicz and Aleksander Józef Lisowski and Swedish army led by Gustav II Adolf.

As a fortification Pskovo-Pechersky Monastery lost its importance after the Great Northern War of 1700–1721. In 1920–1944, Pskovo-Pechorsky Monastery belonged to Estonia. The monastery was one of the few acting male monasteries in the USSR, having been saved from destruction by Pechory being Estonian territory before World War II. In Soviet times, famous Russian mystic Sampson Sievers briefly lived and served in the monastery.

Since the fall of the Soviet Union the monastery has flourished. Currently the monastic community numbers over 90 who through their pastoral labors live the tradition of asceticism and eldership as witnessed recently by the Archimandrite John (Krestiankin). In 2013 the monastery marked the 540th anniversary of its existence.

In 2011 a book by one of its former inhabitants Archimandrite Tikhon (Shevkunov) Everyday Saints and Other Stories, reflecting the Monastery's life, appeared. Over a million copies were printed and over 3 million digital copies sold worldwide by 2012. In 2012 its English translation won a first prize at New York's Read Russia 2012 Festival. Its translator Julian Henry Lowenfeld was baptized into the Orthodox faith that same year, on Holy Saturday, in Moscow's Sretensky Monastery, where Archimandrite Tikhon was hegumen at the time.
