= Glinsk Hermitage =

Orthodox monastery in Sosnivka, Ukraine

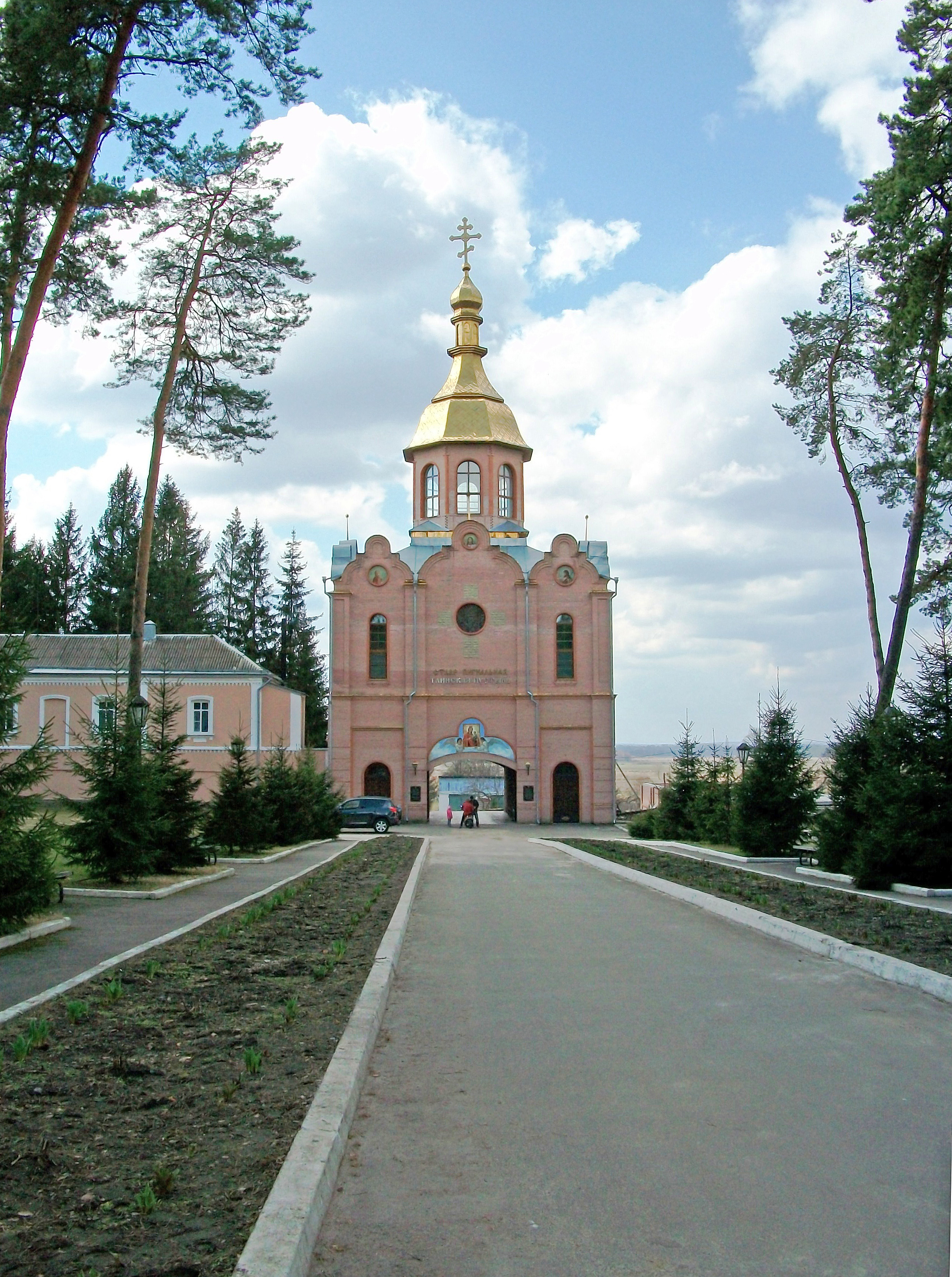
- Gate Church of the Iveron Icon of the Theotokos

- Location within Sumy Oblast Location within Ukraine
- Interactive map of Glinsk Hermitage

Monastery information
- Full name: Nativity of the Theotokos Stavropegial Male Monastery
- Order: Basilian (Orthodox)
- Denomination: Ukrainian Orthodox Church (Moscow Patriarchate)
- Established: 1648
- Dedication: Nativity of the Theotokos
- Diocese: Konotop and Hlukhiv

People
- Founder: Monks from Molchensky Monastery (Putivl)
- Abbot: Metropolitan Vladimir (Sabodan) of Kiev
- Prior: Bishop Anthony (Kripak) of Putivl

Site
- Location: Sosnivka
- Country: Ukraine
- Coordinates: 51°37′31″N 34°03′43″E

The Glinsk Hermitage (formally known as the Nativity of the Theotokos Stavropegial Male Monastery) is a stavropegial monastery of the Ukrainian Orthodox Church (Moscow Patriarchate) located in the village of Sosnivka, near the Russian border. In the 19th and early 20th centuries it was a major spiritual center of the Russian Orthodox Church, and many of its elders have been recently canonized as saints. The monastery is under the Ukrainian Orthodox Church (Moscow Patriarchate) in the diocese of Konotop and Hlukhiv.

== History ==
According to tradition, the monastery was founded in the 17th century in a wooded thicket not far from the city of Putivl, in the village of Sosnovka. There, a miraculous icon of the Nativity of the Theotokos was discovered on a tall pine by beekeepers. The site became a shrine for pilgrimage, and monks from the Molchensky Monastery in Putivl settled there and founded the monastery in 1648. As the thicket was once used by potters as a source of clay (Russian: glina), the monastery became informally known as the Glinsk Hermitage. The first official documentation of the existence of the monastery appeared in the late 17th century; decrees from Patriarch Joachim and Tsars Peter the Great and Ivan V confirmed the right of the monks from Putivl to live at the hermitage. The hermitage was alternatively a dependence of the Molchensky Monastery and the Metropolitan of Kiev before becoming independent in 1764.

Through most of the 18th century the hermitage prospered, and had many benefactors, including Peter the Great’s close advisor Alexander Menshikov. By 1764 the monastery had nearly 12,000 acres of land, which included 80 apiaries and extensive farmland and fishing grounds. However, a 1787 decree of Paul I dispossessed the monastery of nearly all its territory, leaving it with a tiny fraction of its wealth and a subsidy of 300 rubles a year.

The monastery was revived in the early 19th century through the strong leadership of Abbot Philaret (Danilevsky), who served as the monastery’s superior for over twenty years. He restored the monastic order and revived its hesychastic spirit through introducing a new monastic rule based on the order of monasteries on Mount Athos as well as the precepts of Paisius Velichkovsky. The rule was imitated in whole or in part by fourteen other monasteries in Imperial Russia. St. Seraphim of Sarov was a contemporary of Abbot Philaret and would send some of his disciples to become monks at Glinsk, calling it a “great school of monastic life.” The monastery had a high spiritual reputation and enjoyed a close relationship with the Optina Monastery, pilgrims visited the elders of both monasteries for spiritual guidance. The Hermitage also prospered materially and by the end of the 19th century had extensive facilities, including a vocational school for boys, a hospital, and four water-powered mills; the monastery used its resources to undertake extensive charitable work. A report to the Most Holy Synod of the Russian Church commended the monastery for its high level of spiritual life. Some members of the monastic brotherhood later became spiritual fathers of their own monasteries as well as missionaries such as Makarii (Glukharev), who in the early 19th century served as the main transmitter of Orthodox Christianity to the people of the Altai region.

After the Russian Revolution the new atheist government sought to eradicate religion, and the local Soviet closed the monastery in September 1922. The Glinskaya Icon of the Nativity of the Theotokos was transported to a nearby village, where it vanished without a trace. Many of the monks were killed or imprisoned and many of its buildings, including seven of its eight churches, were demolished; the remaining church was converted into a club. The monastery property was in turn a playground, cooperative farm, and industrial combine). With the beginning of the Second World War, and the occupation of the area by German troops, the site was abandoned, and twelve monks, led by the exiled Archimandrite Nektary, returned to the site. The revived monastery remained open from 1942 to 1961, during which the monastery experienced a spiritual revival. However, life at the monastery was difficult: there was no electricity or plumbing, and often the monks had to subsist on beets because they had no bread. Yet many pilgrims came to pray and work to rebuild the monastery. After nineteen years, the monastery was closed in 1961 by the Soviet government as a result of Nikita Khrushchev’s renewed persecution of Christianity.

After Mikhail Gorbachev’s reforms in support of freedom of conscience and the dissolution of the Soviet Union, the monastery was finally able to be reopened in 1994. In 1996 it regained its stavropegial status, and is now under the jurisdiction of the Ukrainian Orthodox Church (Moscow Patriarchate). As a stavropegial monastery, the titular abbot is Metropolitan Vladimir (Sabodan) of Kiev, but the actual superior is Bishop Anthony (Kripak) of Putivl, who acts as the monastery’s prior (Russian: namestnik).

== Elders ==
Many of the elders of the Glinsk Hermitage have been recently canonized as saints by the Ukrainian Orthodox Church (Moscow Patriarchate). On 8 May 2008 thirteen elders, including Abbot Philaret, were glorified as locally venerated saints. In the summer of 2010, three more elders were glorified: Schema-Archimandrite Seraphim, Schema-Archimandrite Andronik, and Schema-Metropolitan Seraphim (Zenobius). In addition, Archimandrite Ilarion (Prikhodko), another modern elder, was a monk at the hermitage and became a hierodeacon there. After the monastery reopened in 1994, the brotherhood offered to make him their superior, but he refused, wanting to stay with the parish he had been leading for over twenty years.
