= Tikhon Shevkunov =

Russian bishop and writer

Tikhon Shevunov
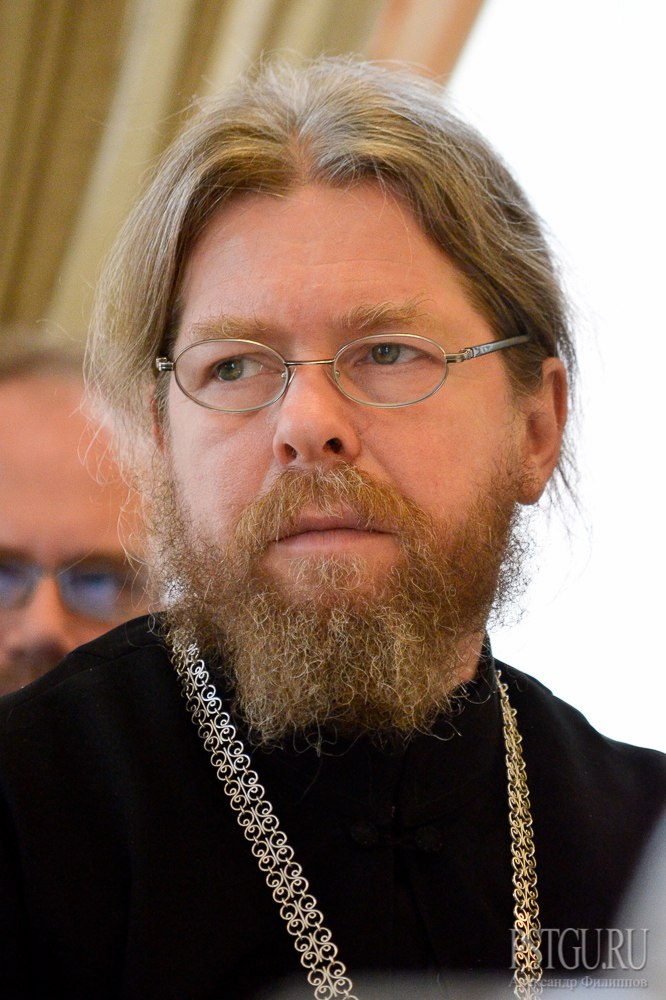
- Bishop Tikhon in April 2016
- Church: Russian Orthodox Church
- Diocese: Eparchy of Vladimir

Orders
- Ordination: 18 July 1991 (deacon); 24 October 2015 (Bishop)
- Rank: Metropolitan

Personal details
- Born: Yuri Vasilyevich Smirnov; 2 July 1958 (age 68) Moscow, Russian SFSR, Soviet Union
- Denomination: Eastern Orthodox Church
- Parents: Yelena Shevkunova
- Education: Gerasimov Institute of Cinematography

Metropolitan Tikhon (Russian: Митрополит Тихон, secular name Georgiy Alexandrovich Shevkunov, Russian: Георгий Александрович Шевкунов; born 2 July 1958 in Moscow) is a bishop of the Russian Orthodox Church and a popular writer. He is the Metropolitan of Pskov and Porkhov; in October 2023 it was reported that he was to be moved to the Diocese of Simferopol and Crimea.

From 2015 to 2018 he was the head of the Western Vicariat of Moscow city.

He was superior of the Sretensky Monastery in Moscow from 1995 to 2018. Tikhon is often referred to as the personal confessor of Russian president Vladimir Putin.

== Biography ==
He was born to Yelena Shevkunova. In 1982 Georgy Shevkunov graduated from the screenwriting school of the Gerasimov Institute of Cinematography. The same year he accepted Christianity, was baptized and moved to the Pskov-Caves Monastery first as a toiler then as a novice. His confessor was Archimandrite John Krestiankin.

In 1986 he was transferred to the publishing department of the Moscow Patriarchate, where he worked under Metropolitan Pitirim (Nechayev). His first appointment was connected with commemoration of the millennial anniversary of the baptism of Rus.

In the first Perestroika years he published a few polemical articles including "Have no fellowship with the works of darkness," ("Не участвуйте в делах тьмы") originally published in The Journal of the Moscow Patriarchate and republished more than one hundred times by different publishers. The work criticized then emerged practice of occult healing. His article "The Church and the State" was published by Literaturnaya Rossiya in November 1990. In the article Shevkunov argued that emerging Russian democracy would definitely act against Russian Orthodox Church.

On 2 July 1991 in Donskoy Monastery Shevkunov took monastic vows assuming the name Tikhon after Patriarch Tikhon of Moscow. At the same time he was ordained as a Hierodeacon and in a month he was ordained as a Hieromonk.

In 1993 Tikhon was appointed the head of the newly created Moscow Metochion of the Pskov-Caves Monastery. The building of the Metochion was previously occupied by the collective of Orthodox Christian thinker and missionary Georgy Kochetkov. Tikhon later criticized Kochetkov and his followers for their "modernism".

In 1995 the Metochion was reformed into the restored Sretensky Stauropegic Monastery and on 8 September 1995 Patriarch Alexy II ordained Tikhon as a Hegumen.

On 8 September 1998 Tikhon was elevated to Archimandrite status.

In 1999 he founded Sretensky Theological Seminary and headed it as rector. He graduated (by correspondence) the same seminary in 2004.

On 5 March 2010 he was appointed the Responsible Secretary of the Patriarchal Council for Culture and on 31 March 2010 a member of the Council for Culture of the President of Russia.

Since 22 March 2011 he has been a member of the Supreme Council of the Russian Orthodox Church.

22 October 2015 the Holy Synod of the Russian Orthodox Church appointed Tikhon to be a Vicar of Moscow Eparchy. The next day he was announced as the Bishop of Yegoryevsk and on 24 October 2015 Patriarch Kirill of Moscow chirotonized him as the Bishop. On 29 October 2015 he was appointed the head of the Western Vicariat of Moscow city.

On 28 February 2025, the FSB arrested two church officials who were accused of trying to kill Tikhon Shevkunov. Ukrainian military intelligence denied the accusations saying they were “absurd" and "lies".

== Church building ==
Tikhon organized the construction of a Cathedral to New Martyrs and Confessors of Russian Church in the historical centre of Moscow, Lubyanka. The construction is controversial as the newly-built cathedral (55 meters high) would be higher than the Dormition Cathedral in Moscow Kremlin (45 meters high). Building of churches higher than Dormition Cathedral was traditionally forbidden in Moscow.

== Books ==
Tikhon is the author of the following books:

- "Father Serafim" (2002) - a children's book telling the story of Seraphim of Sarov.
- "Death of an Empire. Byzantium Lesson" published by Eksmo in 2008.
- "Everyday Saints and Other Stories" (Russian: Несвятые Святые и Другие Рассказы; literally "Unsaintly Saints and Other Stories") first published in 2011, translated to English in 2012. The book was published in more than 2 million copies claiming to be the most popular modern book of the Russian Orthodox Church. In 2012 the book was the best selling book in Russia, competing only with Fifty Shades of Grey.
- "With God's Help Everything Possible. About Faith and Fatherland" (2014).

== Movies ==
- 1989 — Сказы матушки Фроси о монастыре Дивеевском (documentary) (Mother Frosya's Tales about Diveyevo Monastery)
- 2007 — Псково-Печерская обитель (Pskov-Caves Monastery) (documentary).
- 2008 — Death of an Empire. Bysantium lesson(documentary). The movie won the Golden Eagle Award for Best Documentary of 2008. While the film's subject is Byzantium, many critics believed that the lesson about frequent turnover of leaders causing the death of empires was directed to modern Russia rather than ancient Byzantium.
- 2009 — «Чижик-пыжик, где ты был? Фильм о взрослых проблемах наших детей».
- 2010 — «Береги себя». Короткие фильмы антиалкогольной рекламы.
- 2010 — «Давайте выпьем!».
- 2013 — «Женский день».

== Exhibitions ==
Tikhon organized a number of historical exhibitions in Moscow Manege. The last one "My History. 20th Century" was devoted to the 1930-1940s in Russia and often talked about supposed positive contributions by Joseph Stalin. The critics considered the exhibition as an "apology of the Orthodox Christian Stalinism".

== Internet ==
Tikhon is a prolific internet writer. He is the editor-in-chief of the internet-portal Pravoslavie.ru and the author of many publications there.

== Ideology ==
Tikhon is considered to be an ultra-conservative, but it is claimed that he never published anything 'xenophobic.' However, while leading a commission investigating the execution of Tsar Nicholas II and his family, Tikhon stated in 2017 that "many members of the commission believe it was a ritual murder that held special significance for Bolshevik commander Yakov Yurovsky," the commander of the execution squad who was of Jewish birth. This description fits the longstanding formula of blood libels used as pretexts for pogroms and other atrocities against Jews in Europe. Tikhon contested that his accusations were antisemitic or that they referred to Jews at all.

Tikhon supports the Annexation of Crimea by the Russian Federation and he is a member of Crimean Expert-Consultative Council.

He is said to be against ecumenism between the Catholic Church and the Russian Orthodox Church, repeating the saying "Catholics are not even a church and as a result not even Christian."

== Relations with Vladimir Putin ==
Tikhon is rumoured to be the personal confessor (духовник) and spiritual adviser of Russian president Vladimir Putin although both men neither confirm nor deny it. Once asked about his relations with Putin, Tikhon answered: "You can believe those rumours if you want, but they certainly aren't spread by me," adding "I am no Cardinal Richelieu!" Still the men are very close, with Putin often taking Tikhon on his international trips. Their acquaintance goes back to late '90s. According to controversial Russian banker Sergei Pugachev, it was he who introduced Shevkunov to Putin.

In 2026, Tikhon was sanctioned by the European Union as part of a wider package imposed in relation to the Russo-Ukrainian war and the death of Alexei Navalny.

== Awards ==
- Order "For Merit to the Fatherland"
- Order of Friendship (2008)
- Order of Saint Vladimir
- Order of Holy Prince Daniel
