= Diocese of Pskov =

Diocese of Pskov and Porkhov
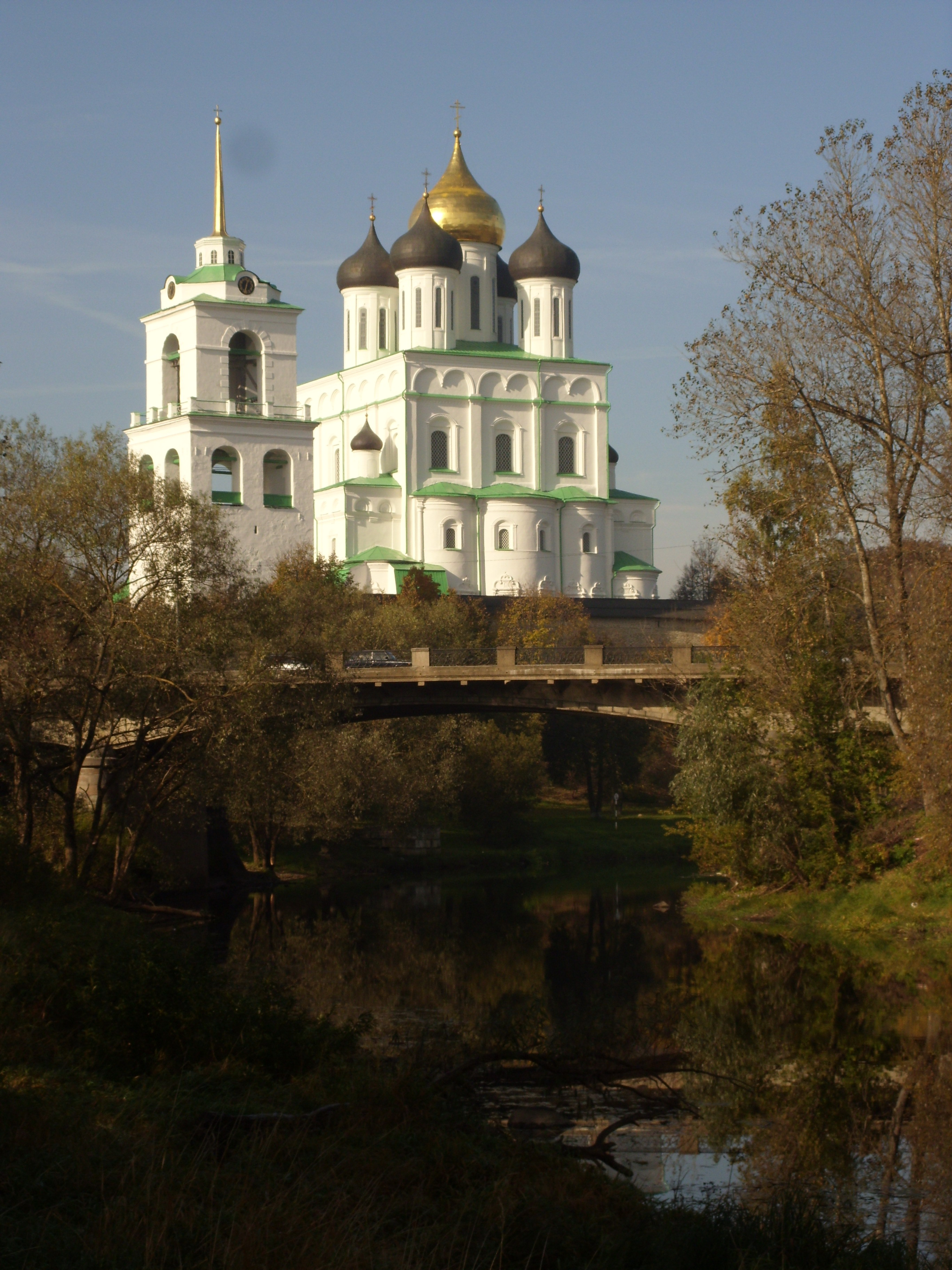

Location
- Headquarters: Trinity Cathedral, Pskov

Information
- Denomination: Eastern Orthodox
- Sui iuris church: Russian Orthodox Church
- Established: 1589
- Language: Old Church Slavonic
- Governance: Eparchy

Website
- www.pskov-eparhiya.ru

The Diocese of Pskov and Porkhov (Russian: Псковская и Порховская епархия) is an eparchy of the Russian Orthodox Church. The ruling bishop is Metropolitan Tikhon (Shevkunov). As of 2008 it consists of 10 monasteries, 212 churches, 108 chapels, 178 priests, 20 deacons.

The diocese was established on January 26 (February 4) 1589 after separating from the Novgorod Diocese.

The cathedra in 1682 was formed by 13 metropolitan, 6 archbishops and 49 bishops. Therefore, suggested to be in Pskov Department of Metropolitan, and was appointed the first metropolitan Markell.

Tikhon (Shevkunov) has been metropolitan of the diocese since 2018. In 2023, it was reported that he was to be moved to the Crimea.
