= Voronezh electoral district =

Constituency of the Russian Republic

Voronezh
- Former Civilian constituency for the All-Russian Constituent Assembly
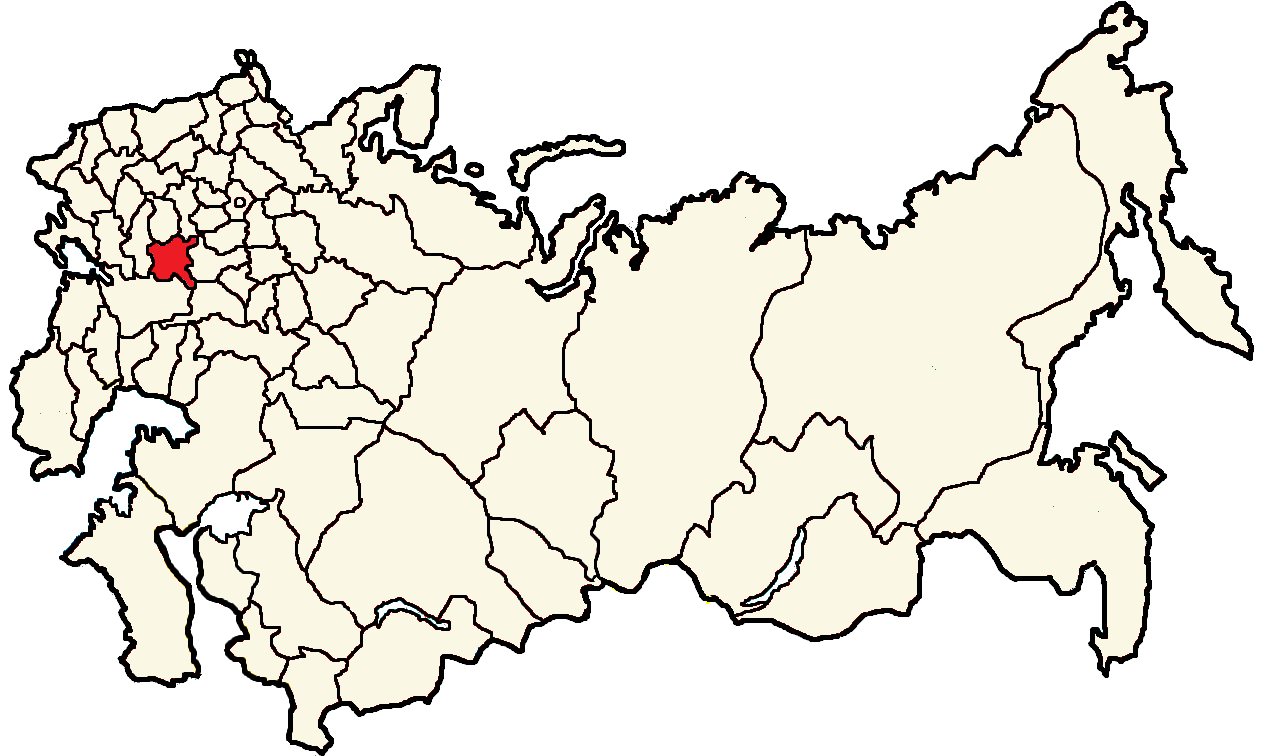

Former constituency
- Created: 1917
- Abolished: 1918
- Number of members: 15
- Number of Uyezd Electoral Commissions: 12
- Number of Urban Electoral Commissions: 1
- Number of Parishes: 224

The Voronezh electoral district (Russian: Воронежский избирательный округ) was a constituency created for the 1917 Russian Constituent Assembly election. The electoral district covered the Voronezh Governorate. 8 out of 16 candidate lists submitted were disqualified from contesting.

== Results ==
Voronezh
Party	Vote	%
List 3 - Socialist-Revolutionaries	875,300	79.72
List 2 - Bolsheviks	151,517	13.80
List 1 - Kadets	36,488	3.32
List 5 - Left SRs-Ukrainian SRs- Polish Socialist Party alliance	11,871	1.08
List 4 - Mensheviks	8,658	0.79
List 8 - Union of Landowners	7,231	0.66
List 6 - Popular Socialists	6,116	0.56
List 7 - Mazury Society of Novokhopersky Uezd	796	0.07
Total:	1,097,977	

Deputies Elected
Kardashov	Bolshevik
Nevsky	Bolshevik
Antipin	SR
Bliznyuk	SR
Burevoy-Soplyakov	SR
Gladkikh	SR
Khrenovsky	SR
Kogan-Bernstein	SR
Mamkin	SR
Nikitin	SR
Oganovsky	SR
Perveeva	SR
Postnikov	SR
Smirnov	SR
Zinin	SR

In Voronezh town the Kadets emerged victorious, obtaining 12,380 votes (58.1%), the SRs 2,611 votes (12.2%), the Bolsheviks 2,536 votes (11.9%), the Mensheviks 1,531 (7.2%), the Popular Socialists 1,289 votes (6.1%), the Union of Landowners 596 votes (2.8%), the Ukrainian SR-SR leftist-PPS list 360 votes (1.7%) and the Mazury list 9 votes. In the Voronezh garrison, the Bolsheviks dominated the polls. They obtained 1,991 votes (56.3%), the SRs 847 votes (23.9%), the Kadets 393 votes (11.1%), the Ukrainian SRs and allies 195 votes (5.5%), the Mensheviks 51 votes (1.4%), the Popular Socialists 33 votes (0.9%), the Union of Landowners 30 votes (0.8%) and the Mazury Society 2 votes (0.1%).
