= Golden Eagle Award for Best Nonfiction Film (Russia) =

Annual Russian film award

- Awarded for: Best Nonfiction Film of the Year
- Country: Russia
- Presented by: National Academy of Motion Pictures Arts and Sciences of Russia
- First award: 2002
- Currently held by: Огненный лис (Fire fox, 2024)
- Website: Official site of the National Academy of Motion Picture Arts and Sciences of Russia

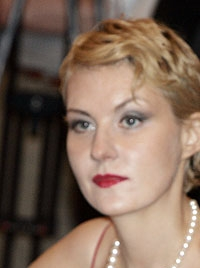
Renata Litvinova's documentary Зеленый театр в Земфире was nominated in 2008

The Golden Eagle Award for Best Nonfiction Film (Russian: Золотой Орёл за лучший неигровой фильм) is one of twenty award categories presented annually by the National Academy of Motion Pictures Arts and Sciences of Russia. It is one of the Golden Eagle Awards, which were conceived by Nikita Mikhalkov as a counterweight to the Nika Award established in 1987 by the Russian Academy of Cinema Arts and Sciences.

Each year the members of the academy shortlist three films for the award. The first film to be awarded was Охота на ангела или Четыре любви поэта и прорицателя. The most recent award was given to Огненный лис, in 2024. Sergey Miroshnichenko holds the record for the most nominations and wins (six and two, respectively).

== Nominees and winners ==
Key

Sign	Meaning
#	Indicates the winner

=== 2000s ===
Year	Original title	Transliterated title (per BGN/PCGN standard)	Director(s)	Ref(s)
2002	Охота на ангела или Четыре любви поэта и прорицателя#	Okhota na angela ili Chetyre lyubvi poeta i proritsatelya	Andrey Osipov	
2002	Живи и радуйся	Zhivi i raduysya	Yuri Schiller	
2002	Форсаж	Forsazh	Natalya Gugueva	
2003	Погибли за Францию#	Pogibli za Frantsiyu	Sergey Zaitsev	
2003	Георгий Жженов. Русский крест (first film)	Georgiy Zhzhenov. Russkiy krest	Sergey Miroshnichenko	
2003	Горе уму или Эйзенштейн и Мейерхольд: двойной портрет в интерьере эпохи	Gore umu ili Eyzenshteyn i Meyerkhol'd: dvoynoy portret v interyere epokhi	Galina Evtushenko	
2004	Михаил Булгаков на Кавказе#	Mikhail Bulgakov na Kavkaze	Georgy Natanson	
2004	Страсти по Марине	Strasti po Marine	Andrey Osipov	
2004	Я умер в детстве	Ya umer v detstve	Georgy Paradzhanov	
2005	Георгий Жженов. Русский крест. Фильм третий «Последние могикане»#	Georgiy Zhzhenov. Russkiy krest. Fil'm tretiy "Posledie mogikane"	Sergey Miroshnichenko	
2005	Правда о «Курске»	Pravda o "Kurske"	Andrey Selivanov	
2005	Тимур. История последнего полета	Timur. Istoriya poslednovo polyota	Natalya Gugueva	
2006	С Романом Карменом... путешествие в молодость#	S Romanom Karmenom... puteshestvie v molodost	Viktor Lisakovich	
2006	Блокада	Blokada	Sergey Loznitsa	
2006	Зощенко и Олеша: двойной портрет в интерьере эпохи	Zoshchenko i Olyosha: dvoynoy portret v interyere epoxi	Evgeny Tsymbal	
2007	Рожденые в СССР. 21 год#	Rozhdenye v SSSR. 21 god	Sergey Miroshnichenko	
2007	Ребро. Портрет жены художника на фоне эпох	Rebro. Portret zheny khudozhnika na fone epokh	Valentin Zalotukha, Galina Leontyeva	
2007	Юрий Арабов. Механика судьбы	Yuri Arabov. Mekhanika sud'by	Arkady Kogan	
2008	Гибель Империи. Византийский урок#	Gibel' Imperii. Vizantiyskiy urok	Olga Savostyanova	
2008	Анастасия	Anastasiya	Viktor Lisakovich	
2008	Зеленый театр в Земфире	Zelenyy teatr v Zemfire	Renata Litvinova	
2009	Рерберг и Тарковский. Обратная сторона «Сталкера»#	Rerberg i Tarkovskiy. Obratnaya storona "Stalkera"	Igor Mayboroda	
2009	Сумерки богов	Sumerki bogov	Sergey Miroshnichenko	
2009	Этюды о Гоголе	Etyudy o Gogole	Evgeny Potievsky	

=== 2010s ===
Year	Original title	Transliterated title (per BGN/PCGN standard)	Director(s)	Ref(s)
2010	Виктор Астафьев. Веселый солдат#	Viktor Astafyev. Vesyolyy soldat	Andrey Zaitsev	
2010	Илья Глазунов. За стойкость при поражении	Ilya Glazunov. Za stoykost' pri porazhenii	Sergey Miroshnichenko	
2010	Священный огонь Химба	Svyashchenyy ogon' Khimba	Sergey Yastrzhembsky	
2011	Михаил Ульянов. О времени и о себе#	Mikhail Ul'yanov. O vremeni i o sebe	Galina Evtushenko	
2011	Книга тундры. Легенда о Вуквукае-маленьком камне	Kniga tundry. Legenda o Vukvukae-malen'kom kamne	Aleksey Vakhrushev	
2011	Река жизни	Reka zhizni	Sergey Miroshnichenko	
2012	Антон тут рядом#	Anton tut ryadom	Lyubov Arkus	
2012	Зима, уходи!	Zima, ukhodi!	Numerous	
2012	Да здраствуют антиподы!	Da zdrastvuyut antipody!	Viktor Kossakovsky	
2013	Африка: Кровь и красота	Afrika: Krov’ i krasota	Sergey Yastrzhembsky	
2013	«Дилогия (Высокая ставка, мы не подписывали договора в Версале)	«Dilogiya (Vysokaya stavka, my ne podpisyvali dogovora v Versale)	Viktor Lisakovich	
2013	Кто такой этот Кустурица?	Kto takoy etot Kusturitsa?	Natalia Gugueva	
2014	Янковский	Yankovsky	Arkadiy Kogan	
2014	Беслан. Память	Beslan. Pamyat’	Vadim Tsalikov	
2014	Лев Толстой и Илья Гинзбург: Двойной портрет на фоне эпохи	Lev Tolstoy i Il’ya Ginzburg: Dvoynoy portret na fone epokhi	Galina Evtushenko	
2015	Варлам Шаламов. Опыт юноши	Varlam Shalamov. Opyt yunoshi	Pavel Pechënkin	
2015	Лев Толстой и Дзига Вертов: Двойной портрет в интерьере эпохи	Lev Tolstoy i Dziga Vertov: Dvoynoy portret v inter’yere epokhi	Anna Evtushenko, Galina Evtushenko	
2015	Не стреляйте в оператора!	Ne strelyayte v operatora!	Valeriy Timoshchenko	
2016	Кровавые бивни	Krovavyye bivni	Sergey Yastrzhembsky	
2016	24 снега	24 snega	Mikhail Barynin	
2016	Забытые полёты	Zabytye polyoty	Andrey Osipov	
2017	Геннадий Шпаликов. Жизнь обаятельного человека	Gennadij Shpalikov. Zhizn' obayatel'nogo cheloveka	Olesya Fokina	
2017	Про рок	Pro rok	Evgenij Grigor'ev	
2017	«Фабрика грёз» для товарища Сталина»	«Fabrika gryoz» dlya tovarishcha Stalina»	Boris Karadzhev	
2018	Медведи Камчатки. Начало жизни	Medvedi Kamchatki. Nachalo zhizni	Irina Zhuravlyova, Vladislav Grishin	
2018	Довженко. Жизнь в цвету	Dovzhenko. Zhizn' v cvetu	Ekaterina Tyutina	
2018	Параджанов. Тарковский. Антипенко. Светотени	Paradzhanov. Tarkovskij. Antipenko. Svetoteni	Andrey Osipov	
2019	Без срока давности. Открывая шкаф позора	Bez sroka davnosti. Otkryvaya shkaf pozora	Aleksandr Zvyagincev	
2019	Антон Чехов и Исаак Левитан: Двойной портрет в интерьере эпохи	Anton Chekhov i Isaak Levitan: Dvojnoj portret v inter'ere ehpokhi	Galina Evtushenko	
2019	Оперение	Operenie	Il'ya Zernov	

=== 2020s ===
Year	Original title	Transliterated title (per BGN/PCGN standard)	Director(s)	Ref(s)
2020	Пространство стиха: Борис Слуцкий	Prostranstvo stikha: Boris Sluckij	Viktor Tkachyov	
2020	Станиславский. Жажда жизни	Stanislavskij. Zhazhda zhizni	Julia Bobkova	
2020	Шаман	Shaman	Andrey Osipov	
2021	Бондарчук. Battle	Bondarchuk. Battle	Il'ya Belov	
2021	Байкал. Удивительные приключения Юмы	Bajkal. Udivitel'nye priklyucheniya Yumy	Anastasia Popova	
2021	Кто тебя победил никто	Kto tebya pobedil nikto	Lyubov' Arkus	
2022	Фаза Луны	Faza Luny	Andrej Osipov	
2022	Балабанов. Колокольня. Реквием	Balabanov. Kolokol'nya. Rekviem	Lyubov Arkus	
2022	Голоса Арктики	Golosa Arktiki	Ivan Vdovin	
2023	Мельников	Mel'nikov	Marina Maria Melnik	
2023	Киноязык эпохи: Марлен Хуциев	Kinoyazyk ehpokhi: Marlen Khuciev	Andrey Istratov	
2023	Симоновы и Трошкины: двойной портрет в интерьере эпохи	Simonovy i Troshkiny: dvojnoj portret v inter'ere ehpokhi	Galina Evtushenko	
2024	Огненный лис	Ognennyj lis	Dmitry Shpilenok	
2024	Где живёт счастье. Соловки	Gde zhivyot schast'e. Solovki	Danil Akimov	
2024	Улыбнись!	Ulybnis'!	Marianna Kireeva	
