= Zadonsk =

Town in Lipetsk Oblast, Russia

Zadonsk Задонск
- Town
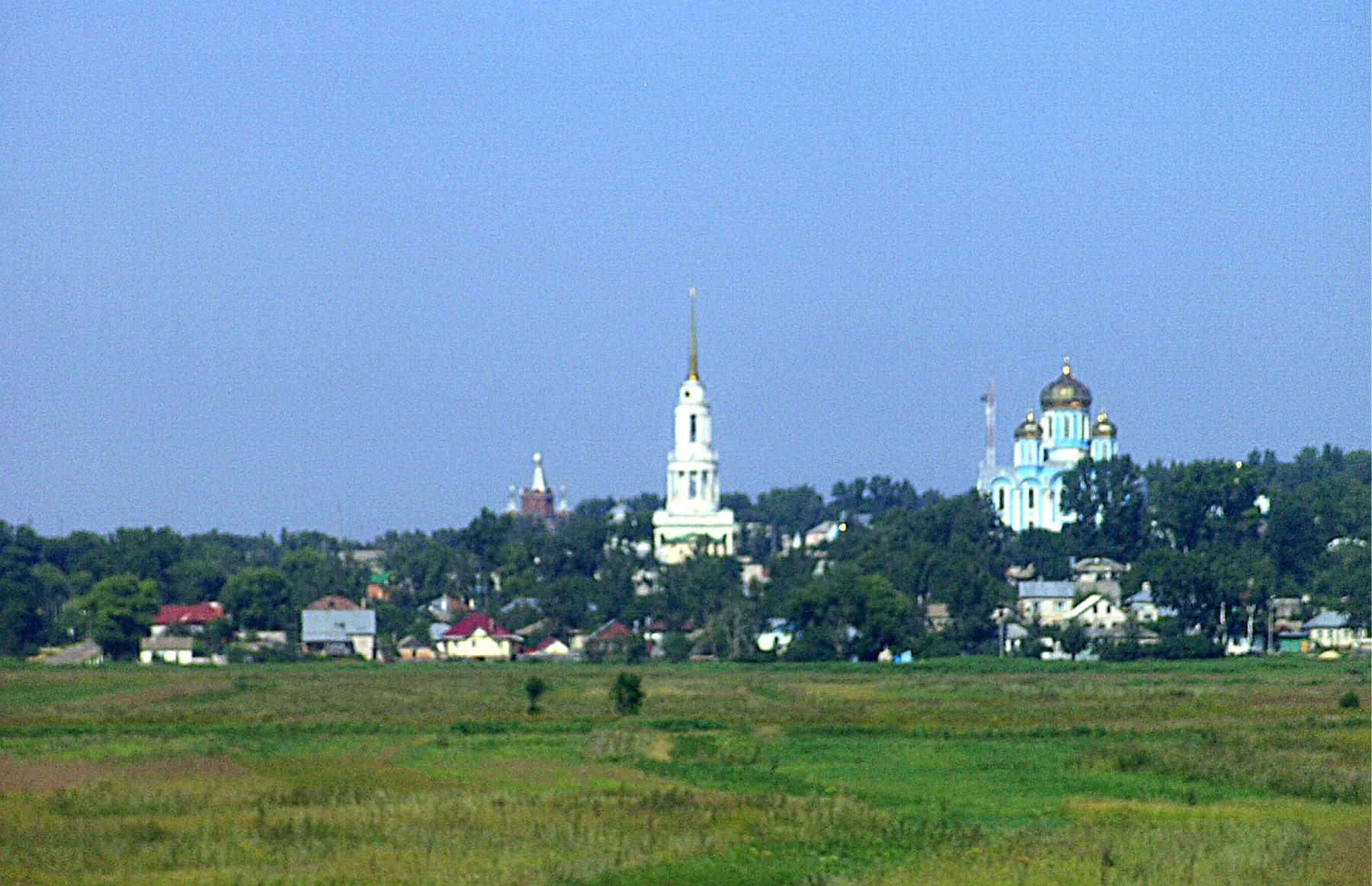
- Zadonsk as seen from the M4 Highway

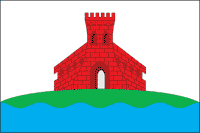
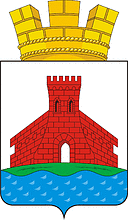
- Flag Coat of arms
- Interactive map of Zadonsk
- Location of Zadonsk Zadonsk (Lipetsk Oblast)
- Coordinates: 52°24′N 38°56′E
- Country: Russia
- Federal subject: Lipetsk Oblast
- Administrative district: Zadonsky District
- Town under district jurisdictionSelsoviet: Zadonsk
- Founded: 1615
- Town status since: 1779
- Elevation: 140 m (460 ft)

Population (2010 Census)
  - Total: 9,698
  - Estimate (2021): 9,887 (+1.9%)

Administrative status
  - Capital of: Zadonsky District, Zadonsk Town Under District Jurisdiction

Municipal status
  - Municipal district: Zadonsky Municipal District
  - Urban settlement: Zadonsk Urban Settlement
  - Capital of: Zadonsky Municipal District, Zadonsk Urban Settlement
- Time zone: UTC+3 (MSK)
- Postal codes: 399200, 399201, 399249
- OKTMO ID: 42624101001

Zadonsk (Russian: Задо́нск) is a town and the administrative center of Zadonsky District in Lipetsk Oblast, Russia, located on the left bank of the Don River, from which it takes its name, 92 kilometers (57 mi) southwest of Lipetsk, the administrative center of the oblast. Population: 9,887 (2021 census); 9,698 (2010 census); 10,473 (2002 census); 11,186 (1989 Soviet census).

== History ==
It originated in 1615 as a settlement near the walls of the Zadonsky (literally, "over-the-Don") monastery, founded in 1610 by several monks from the Sretensky Monastery in Moscow. The abbey became famous in the 1770s, when a miracle-working starets Tikhon settled there. He died in 1783 and was buried in Zadonsk, which would prosper due to crowds of pilgrims who visited his grave each year. Zadonsk was granted town status in 1779.

== Administrative and municipal status ==
Within the framework of administrative divisions, Zadonsk serves as the administrative center of Zadonsky District. As an administrative division, it is incorporated within Zadonsky District as Zadonsk Town Under District Jurisdiction. As a municipal division, Zadonsk Town Under District Jurisdiction is incorporated within Zadonsky Municipal District as Zadonsk Urban Settlement.

== Gallery ==
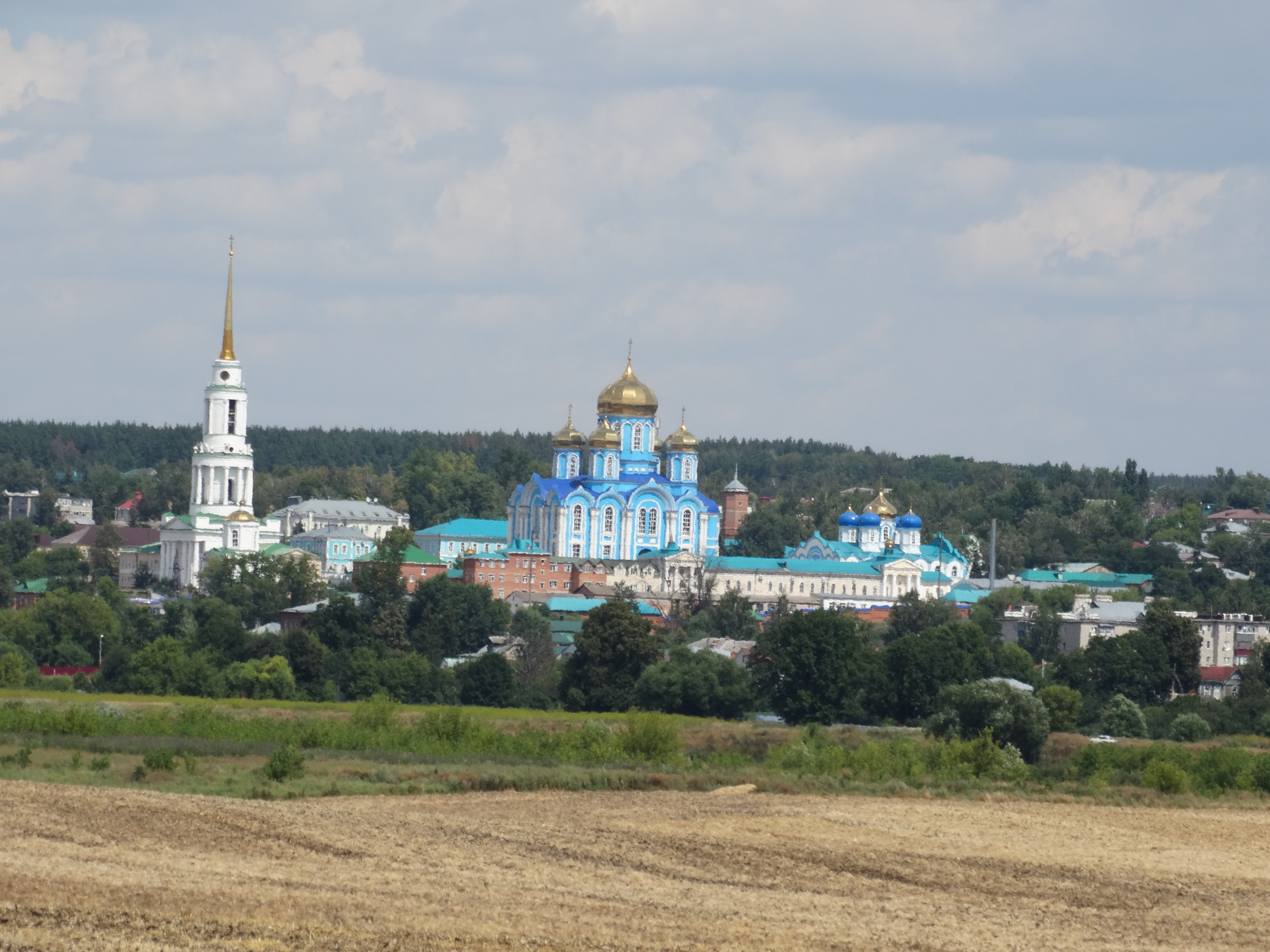

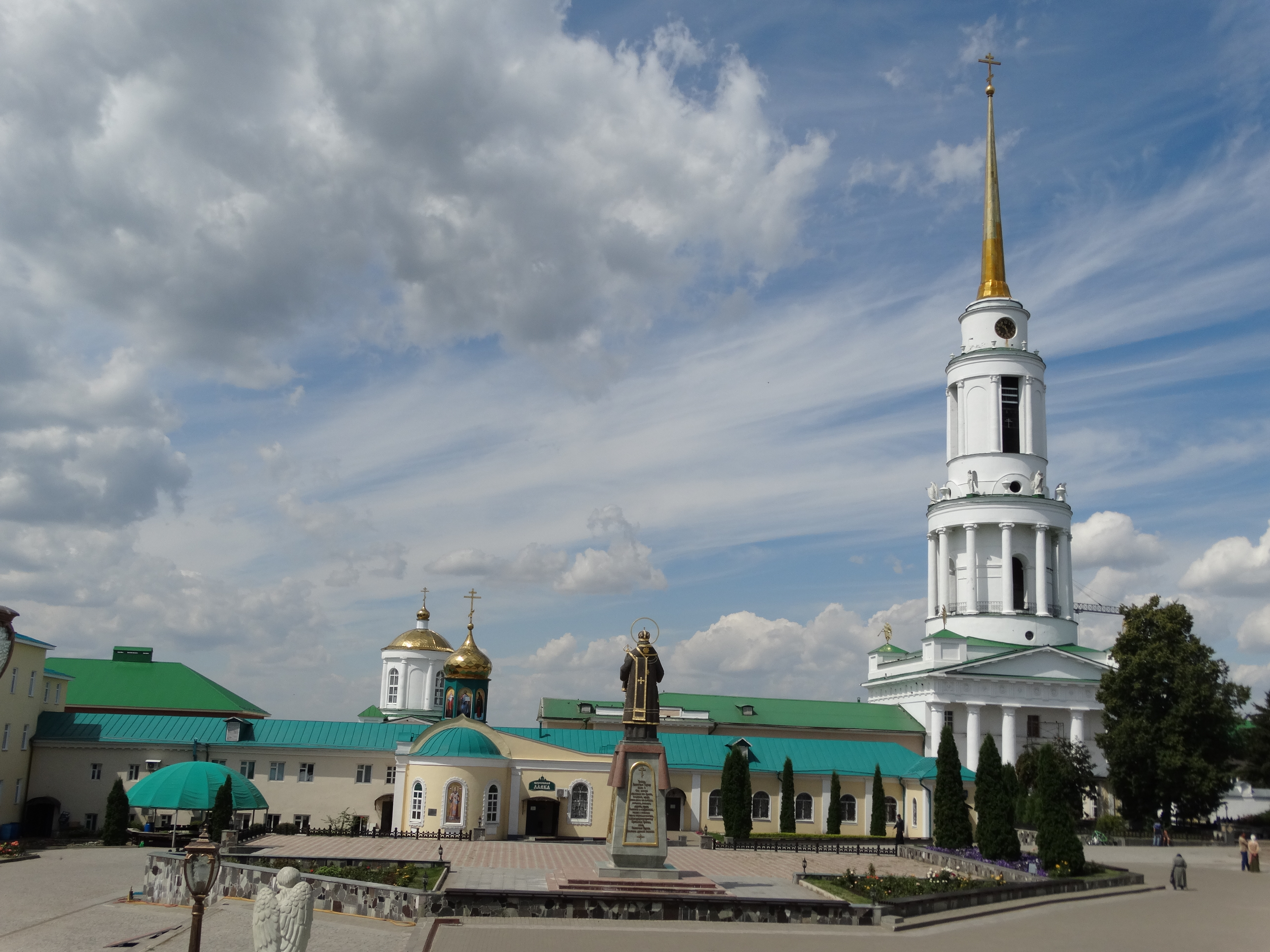

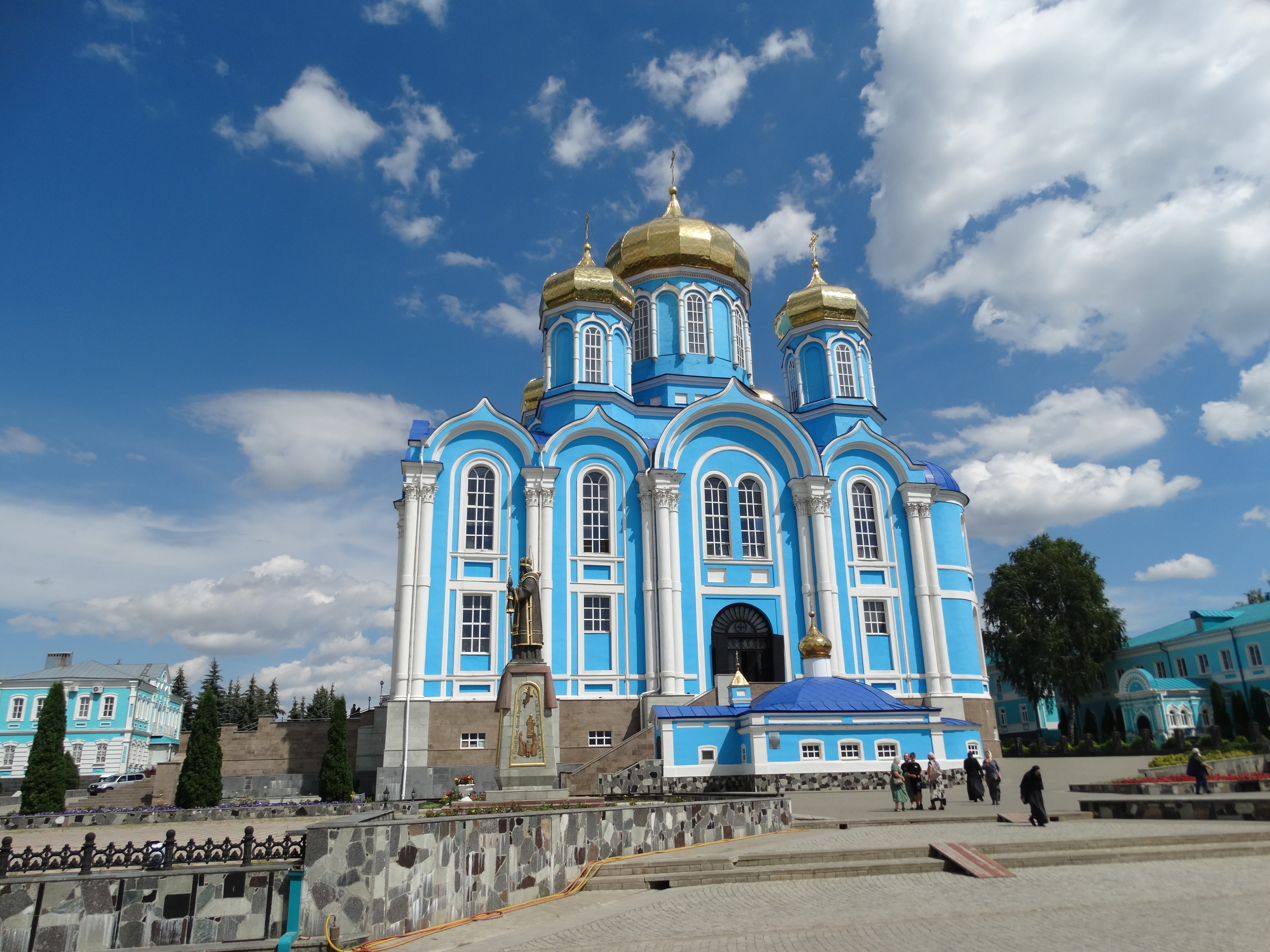

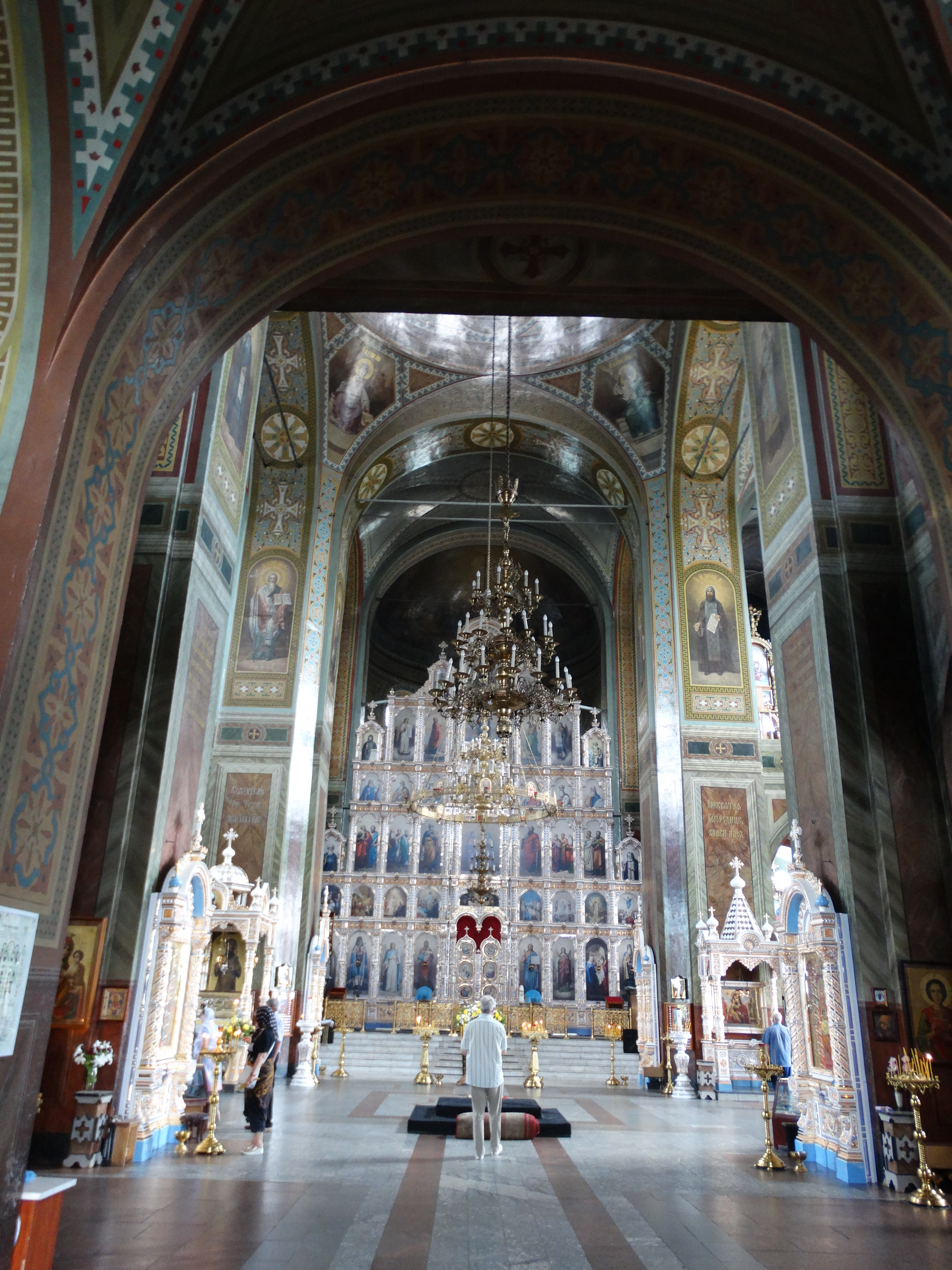

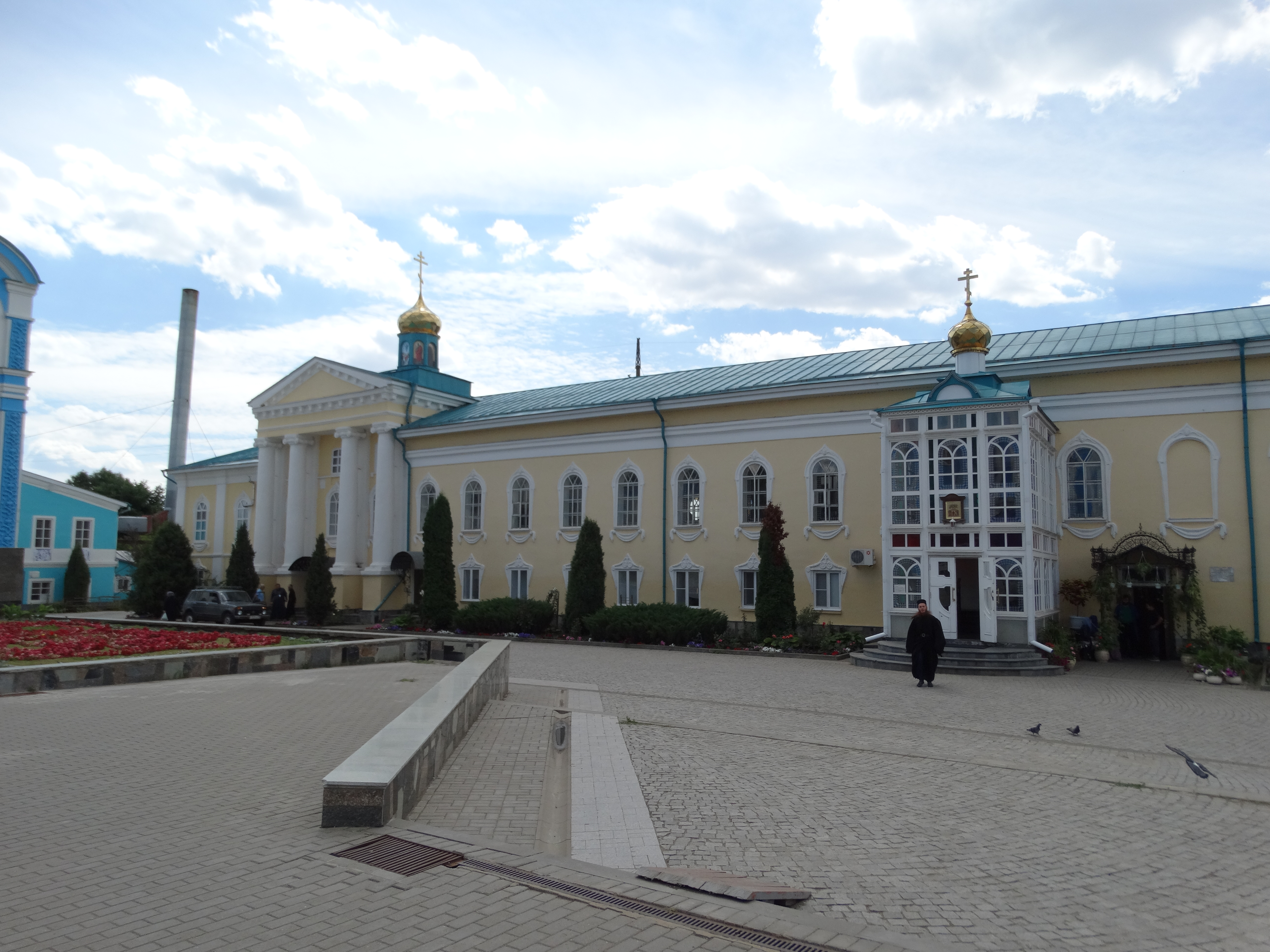
