= Julian Henry Lowenfeld =

American poet

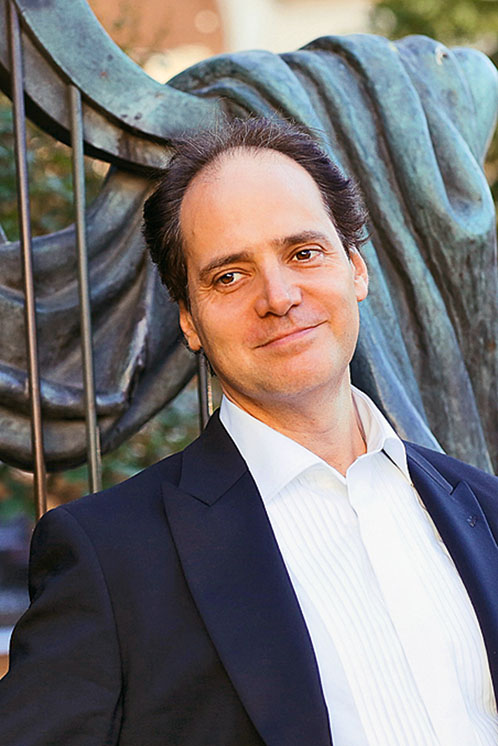
- Born: June 7, 1963 (age 63); Washington D.C., U.S.
- Citizenship: United States; Russia
- Occupations: poet, playwright, trial lawyer, composer, translator
- Notable work: My Talisman: The Poetry & Life of Alexander Pushkin

Julian Henry Lowenfeld (born June 7, 1963) is an American poet, playwright, trial lawyer, composer, and prize-winning translator, best known for his translations of Alexander Pushkin's poetry into English.

== Life ==
Lowenfeld was born in Washington, D.C. to Andreas Lowenfeld, a German-Jewish Professor of International Law (NYU), and Elena Lowenfeld, a Cuban guitar player and art critic. His great-grandfather Raphael Löwenfeld, a correspondent for the newspaper Berliner Tagesblatt in St. Petersburg, was the first translator of Leo Tolstoy into German, and Tolstoy's play The Power of Darkness had its world premiere in the Schiller Theater, Berlin, which Löwenfeld founded. After the Russian Revolution, the Nabokov family lived in the Löwenfeld home in Berlin.

Lowenfeld studied Russian literature at Harvard, did postgraduate work at St. Petersburg University and then obtained his J.D. degree at New York University. As a trial lawyer, Lowenfeld won several multimillion-dollar judgments on behalf of major Russian film studios Mosfilm, Lenfilm, and Soyuzmultfilm Studios and their licensees against copyright pirates in the USA.

Lowenfeld translates from 8 languages, including Russian, German, Spanish, French, Italian and Latin. He has translated verses of Lermontov, Blok, Mandelshtam, Tsvetaeva, Akhmatova, Yesenin, Mayakovsky, Rilke, Goethe, Heine, Pessoa, Lorca, Machado, Martí, Neruda, Leopardi, Petrarch, Dante, Catullus, Ovid, Martial, and Horace.

His translations of Alexander Pushkin are considered to be "the most brilliant and fullest translation" of Pushkin's works:

Я вас любил: любовь еще, быть может, I loved you once, and still, perhaps, love’s yearning

В душе моей угасла не совсем; Within my soul has not quite burned away.

Но пусть она вас больше не тревожит; Yet may that nevermore you be concerning;

Я не хочу печалить вас ничем. I would not wish you sad in any way.

Original: Alexander Pushkin Translation: Julian Henry Lowenfeld.

Pushkin's Little Tragedies, translated into verse by Lowenfeld, were staged at the Baryshnikov Arts Center in New York in 2009.

== Performances ==
Lowenfeld has recited, in both Russian and English, at theatrical and musical productions around the world.

== Awards ==
In 2007, Lowenfeld translated the video collection Animated Soviet Propaganda (4 DVDs), which won the New York Times' "Critics' Choice" Award.

Lowenfeld's dual language compilation titled My Talisman: The Poetry & Life of Alexander Pushkin earned him the prestigious Russian art and literature ‘Petropol’ prize in 2010.

In 2012, his translation of the Russian bestseller Everyday Saints and Other Stories won first prize at New York's Read Russia 2012 Festival. Over a million books were printed and over 3 million digital copies sold worldwide by 2012.

For his "outstanding literary translations and dedicated efforts to popularize Russian culture in the English language" Lowenfeld has received numerous prizes and awards.

== Religious beliefs ==
In year 2012 Julian Henry Lowenfeld was baptized into Christian Orthodox faith in Moscow's Sretensky Monastery.
