= Zadonsky (rural locality) =

Zadonsky (Russian: Задонский; masculine), Zadonskaya (Задонская; feminine), or Zadonskoye (Задонское; neuter) is the name of several rural localities in Rostov Oblast, Russia:

- Zadonsky, Azovsky District, Rostov Oblast, a khutor in Zadonskoye Rural Settlement of Azovsky District
- Zadonsky, Bagayevsky District, Rostov Oblast, a settlement in Bagayevskoye Rural Settlement of Bagayevsky District
