= John Krestiankin =

Russian archimandrite

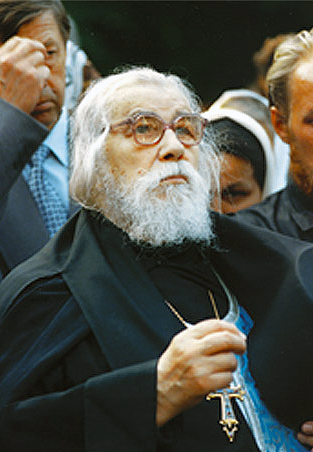
John Krestiankin

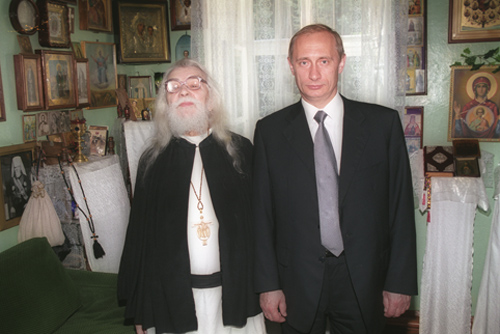
Father John Krestiankin and Vladimir Putin, 2000

Archimandrite John (Ioann, Russian: Архимандрит Иоанн, secular name Ivan Mikhailovich Krestiankin, Russian: Иван Михайлович Крестьянкин; 1910–2006) was an archimandrite of the Pskov Caves Monastery of Russian Orthodox Church.

He was born in 1910 in the city of Oryol as an eighth child in the family of Mikhail and Elizaveta Krestiankin. The name Ivan was given to the boy in honour of Saint John of the Desert. His letters and theological works are well known and widely published in Russia and some other countries. Many cases of Fr. John's clairvoyance and wonderworking were recorded.

In 1950 John was arrested by the Soviet authorities for his pastoral service and sentenced for seven years of labour camps. He was freed in 1955.

Father John was a spiritual father and confessor for many Orthodox parishioners, providing religious instructions and guidance on various aspects of the faith and Christian life within the Orthodox Church. Among his notable spiritual children was Archimandrite Tikhon (Shevkunov), the author of the best-selling spiritual memoir Everyday Saints, and Archimandrite Hilarion (Prikhodko), a highly regarded spiritual father in his own right who ministered in the Novgorod region.

Among his most famous books are "The Experience of Preparing a Confession", "Sermons, Thoughts and Congratulations", "Reference Book for Monastics and Laymen", the compilation "Letters of Archimandrite John (Krestiankin)".

John Krestiankin died in 2006 at the age of 95 years.

On 8 February 2021 the Pskov Diocese of the Russian Orthodox Church announced that it is currently in the process of canonizing him.

== Bibliography ==
- The Experience of Preparing a Confession (Опыт построения исповеди)
- Sermons, Thoughts and Congratulations
- Reference Book for Monastics and Laymen
