= Zadonsky District =

Zadonsky District Задонский район (Russian)
- District
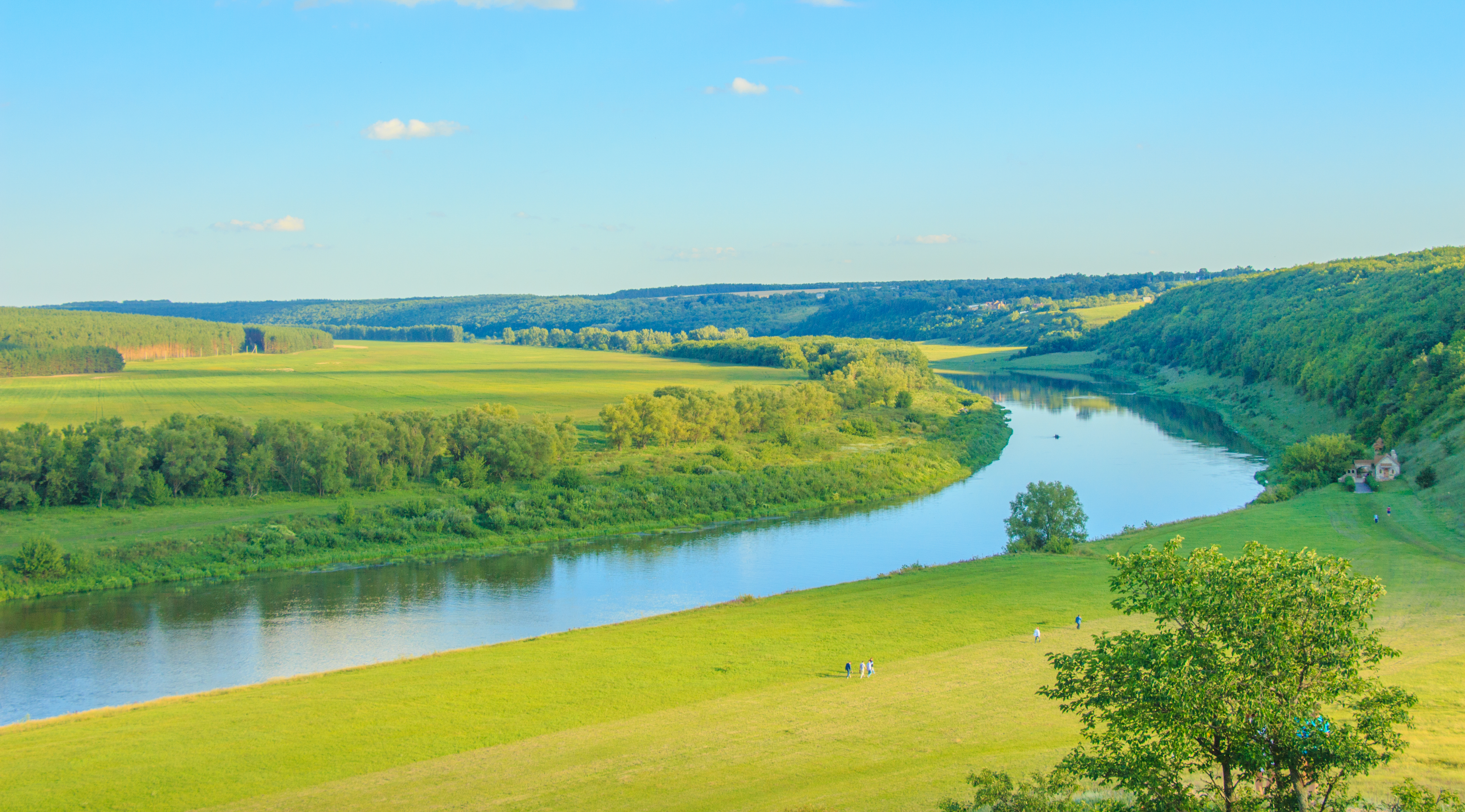
- A view over the Don River from Kamenka, Zadonsky District

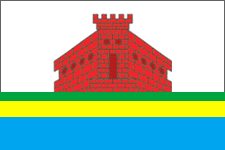
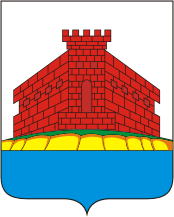
- Flag Coat of arms
- Location of Zadonsky District in Lipetsk Oblast
- Coordinates: 52°23′N 38°55′E
- Country: Russia
- Federal subject: Lipetsk Oblast
- Administrative center: Zadonsk

Area
  - Total: 1,503 km^{2} (580 sq mi)

Population (2010 Census)
  - Total: 34,959
  - Density: 23.26/km^{2} (60.24/sq mi)
  - Urban: 27.7%
  - Rural: 72.3%

Administrative structure
  - Administrative divisions: 1 Towns under district jurisdiction, 17 Selsoviets
  - Inhabited localities: 1 cities/towns, 122 rural localities

Municipal structure
  - Municipally incorporated as: Zadonsky Municipal District
  - Municipal divisions: 1 urban settlements, 17 rural settlements
- Time zone: UTC+3 (MSK)
- OKTMO ID: 42624000
- Website: http://www.admzadonsk.ru/

Zadonsky District (Russian: Задо́нский райо́н) is an administrative and municipal district (raion), one of the eighteen in Lipetsk Oblast, Russia. It is located in the southern central part of the oblast. The area of the district is 1,503 square kilometers (580 sq mi). Its administrative center is the town of Zadonsk. Population: 34,408 (2021 census); 34,959 (2010 census); 37,244 (2002 Census); 39,281 (1989 Soviet census). The population of Zadonsk accounts for 28.7% of the district's total population.
