= Ksenia Luchenko =

- Ксения Валерьевна Лученко
- Luchenko in 2020
- Born: 13 June 1979 (age 47); Moscow, Soviet Union
- Education: Moscow State University
- Occupations: Journalist, writer, researcher, media educator

Ksenia Luchenko (Russian: Ксения Валерьевна Лученко; born 13 June 1979) is a Russian journalist, writer and researcher specialising in the Russian Orthodox Church and its relations with the state and society. She has also worked in media education and served as dean of the Faculty of Media Communications at the Moscow School for the Social and Economic Sciences, known as Shaninka.

Her book Blagimi namereniyami (With Good Intentions, 2025), on church–state relations in Russia, received the PolitProsvet special award of the Enlightener Prize. She left Russia in April 2022, following the full-scale invasion of Ukraine. In March 2026, a Russian court sentenced her in absentia to eight years' imprisonment over an anti-war social-media post.

== Early life and education ==
Luchenko was born in Moscow on 13 June 1979. She graduated from the Faculty of Journalism at Moscow State University in 2001. In 2009, she defended her dissertation for the degree of Candidate of Philological Sciences, examining the use of the internet in the information and communication activities of religious organisations in Russia.

== Career ==
=== Journalism ===
From 2002, Luchenko worked for the Publishing Council of the Russian Orthodox Church and as a columnist for the newspaper Tserkovny vestnik. She edited the television programme Russky vzglyad between 2006 and 2009 and was editor-in-chief of the online publication Tatyana's Day from November 2009 to February 2011.

Her reporting and analysis have focused on religious life in post-Soviet Russia and the political role of Orthodoxy. She has also edited documentary films about Soviet dissidents and intellectuals. Her work has been published by Meduza and the Carnegie Moscow Center.

Luchenko runs the Telegram channel Pravoslaviye i zombi (Orthodoxy and Zombies), which covers the Russian Orthodox Church and supports priests who oppose Russia's war in Ukraine. For the channel, she won the Digital Channels category of the 2025 Profession–Journalist award; the winners were announced in February 2026.

=== Teaching and research ===
Luchenko began teaching at the School of Media Communications of the Russian Presidential Academy of National Economy and Public Administration (RANEPA) in 2015. In 2019, she became head of the Department of Theory and Practice of Media Communications at RANEPA's Institute of Social Sciences. She also served as dean of the Faculty of Media Communications at Shaninka until spring 2022.

In 2018, she began working on the teaching methodology of How to Read Media?, a media literacy project run by the Goethe-Institut in Moscow and Colta.ru with support from the European Union.

After emigrating in April 2022, Luchenko continued her research and educational work abroad. She was a visiting fellow in the Wider Europe programme of the European Council on Foreign Relations in 2023–2024. She co-founded the Faculty of Liberal Arts and Sciences (FLAS) in Montenegro and became head of its Journalism and Media Studies programme. She has also worked as a research fellow at the New Eurasian Strategies Centre, specialising in church–state relations, ideology and media.

== Books ==
Luchenko's Matushki: Zheny svyashchennikov o zhizni i o sebe (Matushki: Priests' Wives on Their Lives and Themselves, 2012) examines the lives of Russian Orthodox priests' wives. She has also written children's non-fiction, including Ya muravey (I Am an Ant), an introduction to the lives of ants illustrated by Andrey Popov.

Her 2025 book Blagimi namereniyami: Russkaya tserkov i vlast ot Gorbacheva do Putina (With Good Intentions: The Russian Church and the State from Gorbachev to Putin) traces changes in relations between the Russian Orthodox Church and political power from the late Soviet period onwards. Luchenko argues that the church moved from a degree of independence during perestroika and the early post-Soviet years towards a close ideological alliance with Vladimir Putin's government. Published by Ekho Knigi with support from the StraightForward Foundation, the book received the PolitProsvet special award of the Enlightener Prize in November 2025.

== Criminal prosecution ==
On 16 May 2025, the Russian Ministry of Justice placed Luchenko on its register of foreign agents. Investigators opened a criminal case in September 2025 over a Telegram post of 8 July 2024 condemning the Russian missile strike on the Okhmatdyt children's hospital in Kyiv.

On 24 March 2026, Moscow's Gagarin District Court convicted her in absentia of disseminating knowingly false information about the Russian Armed Forces. The court sentenced her to eight years' imprisonment and imposed a four-year ban on administering websites. Luchenko rejected the allegation that her post contained false information. She and her lawyers filed an appeal on 6 April 2026.

== Selected bibliography ==
- Luchenko, Ksenia (2012). Матушки: Жены священников о жизни и о себе [Matushki: Priests' Wives on Their Lives and Themselves] (in Russian). Moscow.
- Luchenko, Ksenia (2022). Я муравей [I Am an Ant] (in Russian). Illustrated by Andrey Popov. Alpina Deti. ISBN 978-5-9614-7898-3.
- Luchenko, Ksenia (2025). Благими намерениями: Русская церковь и власть от Горбачёва до Путина [With Good Intentions: The Russian Church and the State from Gorbachev to Putin] (in Russian). Ekho Knigi. ISBN 978-601-82257-6-5.
