= Sretensky Monastery =

Orthodox monastery in Moscow, Russia

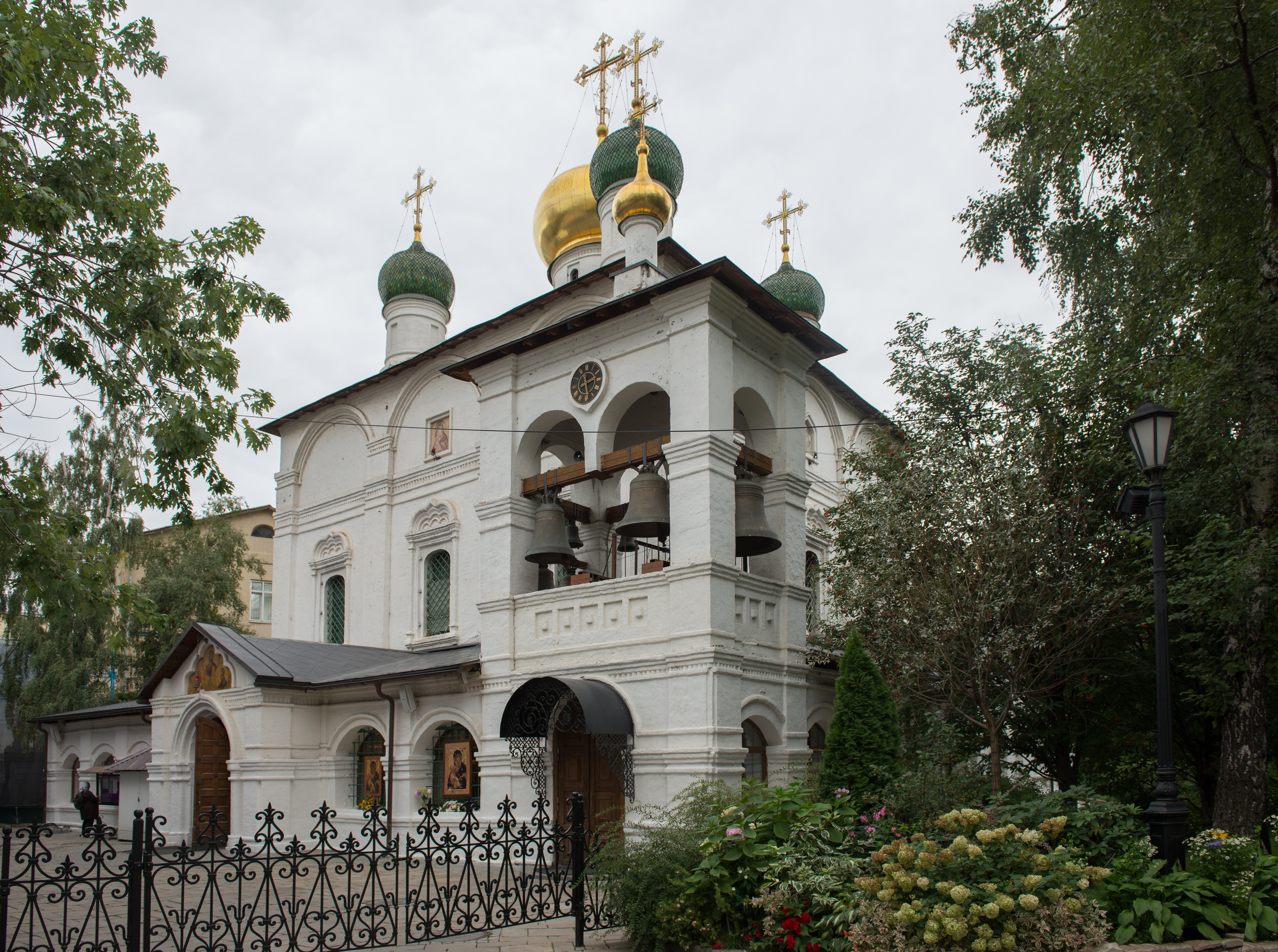
- The katholikon (1677–1679) on the territory of the monastery
- Interactive map of Sretensky Monastery

Monastery information
- Order: Orthodox
- Established: 1397
- Diocese: Moscow

People
- Founder: Vasili I

Site
- Location: Moscow, Russia
- Coordinates: 55°45′56.4″N 37°37′48.8″E

Sretensky Monastery (Russian: Сретенский монастырь, romanized: Sretenskiy monastyr') is an Orthodox monastery in Moscow, founded by Grand Prince Vasili I in 1397. It used to be located close to the present-day Red Square, but in the early 16th century it was moved northeast to what is now Bolshaya Lubyanka Street. The Sretensky Monastery gave its name to adjacent streets and byways, namely Sretenka Street, Sretensky Boulevard, Sretensky Lane, Sretensky Deadend, and Sretensky Gates Square. Sretensky Theological Academy is subordinated to the monastery.

== History ==
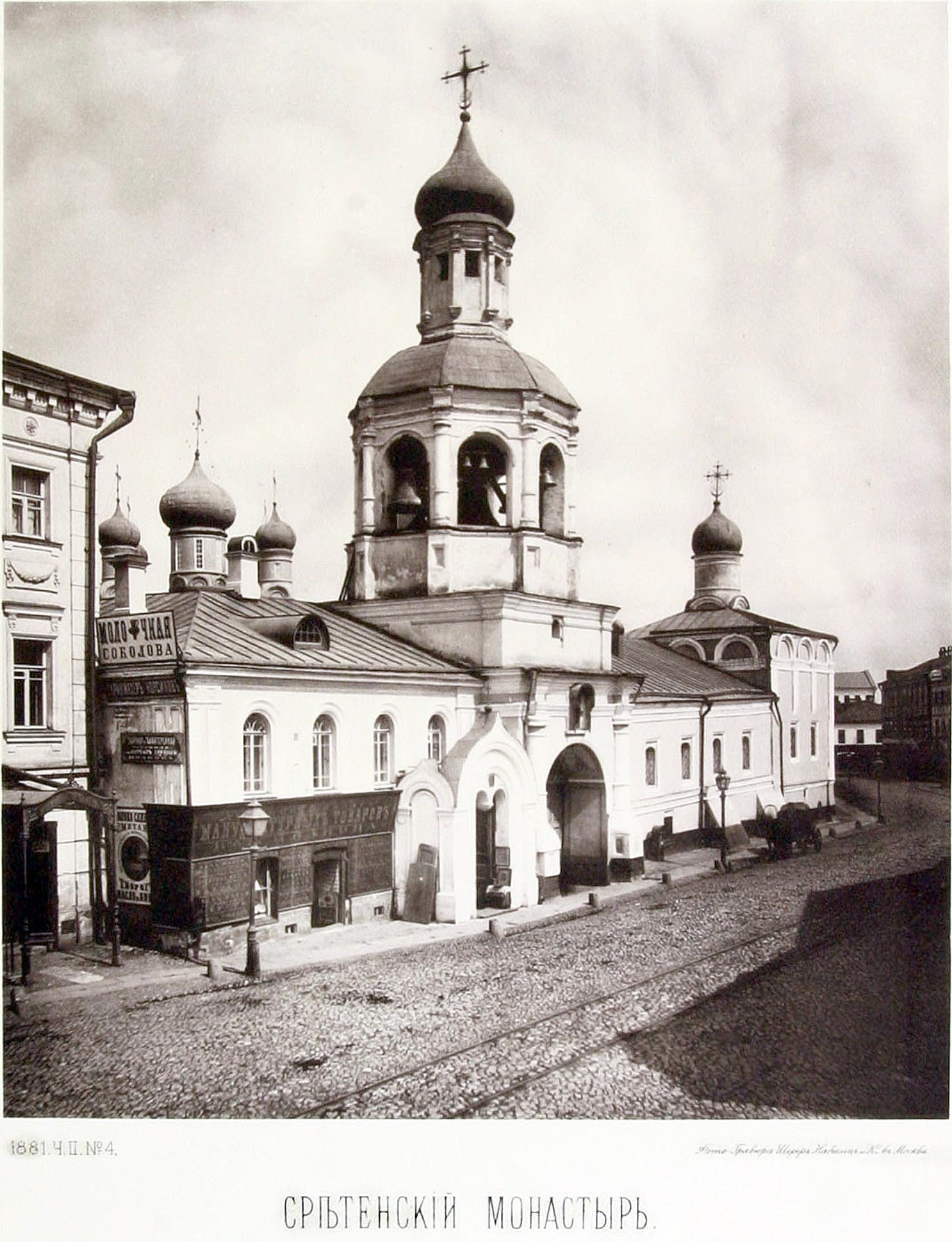
View of the monastery from Lubyanka Street in 1882.

Unlike most other Russian Orthodox churches of the same name the monastery is not, as might be expected, named after one of the twelve Great Feasts of Russian Orthodox Church Sretenie Gospodne (Presentation of Our Lord in the Temple), with Sretenie being a Church Slavonic word for "meeting".

The origin of the monastery's name comes from the fact that it was built on the spot where the muscovites and the ruling Prince had met the icon of Our Lady of Vladimir on August 26, 1395. It was being moved from Vladimir to Moscow to protect the capital from the imminent invasion of Tamerlane. Soon thereafter, the armies of Tamerlane retreated and the grateful monarch founded the monastery to commemorate the miracle. In 1552, the Muscovites gathered at the walls of the monastery to meet the Russian army returning after the conquest of Kazan.

In 1925, the monastery was closed down. In 1928–1930, most of its buildings were dismantled by the Soviets, including the Church of Mary of Egypt (14th-16th century) and Church of Saint Nicholas (16th century). Only the Cathedral of the Meeting of the Icon of Our Lady of Vladimir (собор Сретения Владимирской иконы Богоматери) with a side chapel to the Nativity of John the Forerunner (built in 1679 by the order of tsar Fyodor Alexeyevich) survived to this day.

Services in the Vladimirsky Cathedral resumed in 1991. The cathedral was transferred to the authority of the Pskovo-Pechorsky Monastery in 1994, but nowadays it is a separate monastic establishment, with Patriarch Kirill as its archimandrite. In July 1995 the Holy Synod re-established Sretensky as a stauropegial monastery and appointed Tikhon (Shevkunov) as its namestnik, the Patriarch's representative; he held the post until May 2018. Since August 2020 the namestnik has been Hegumen Ioann (Ludishchev).

A monastic theological school was founded on the same site in 1999 and was reorganised as a seminary in December 2002; it is now the Sretensky Theological Academy.

== The new church ==
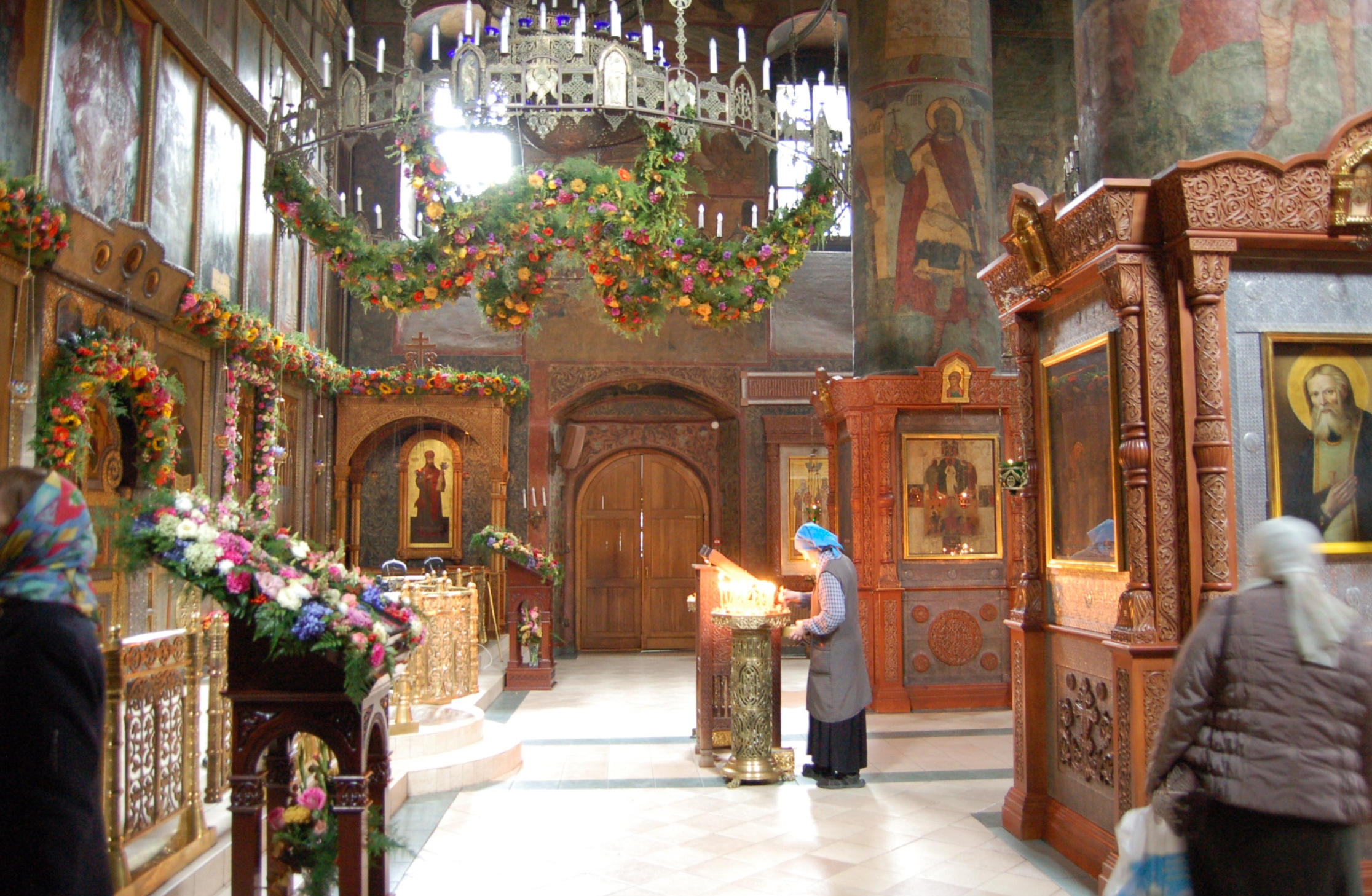
Inside the old katholikon

In November 2013, an official body that oversees construction on heritage sites approved the construction of a large "church on blood" dedicated to the New Martyrs and Confessors of the Russian Orthodox Church. The 61-metre-high building, fittingly situated next door to the infamous Lubyanka Prison, was completed in early 2017, in time for the 100th anniversary of the October Revolution when attacks on the Russian Orthodox Church had begun. Architectural preservationists voiced their concern that the outsize building would irrevocably alter the surrounding cityscape.

== Choir ==
The monastery maintains an all-male choir, which sings at its services and gives concerts in Russia and abroad.

In October 2012 about thirty of its singers toured the United States, visiting nine cities in twenty days; the tour began with a performance at the Library of Congress for invited guests and a public concert at the Terrace Theater of the Kennedy Center in Washington. Alongside Russian Orthodox church music, its programmes have included Russian, Ukrainian and Cossack folk songs, twentieth-century Russian repertoire and the spiritual "Go Down Moses".

The choir performed the Russian national anthem at the opening ceremony of the 2014 Winter Olympics in Sochi.

In March 2019 the choir appeared at the Adelaide Festival in Australia, giving a concert of sacred and folk repertoire at Adelaide Town Hall. The concert was nominated for Best Chamber and/or Instrumental Ensemble Concert at the 19th Helpmann Awards.
