= Dmitryashevka =

Dmitryashevka Russian: Дмитряшевка
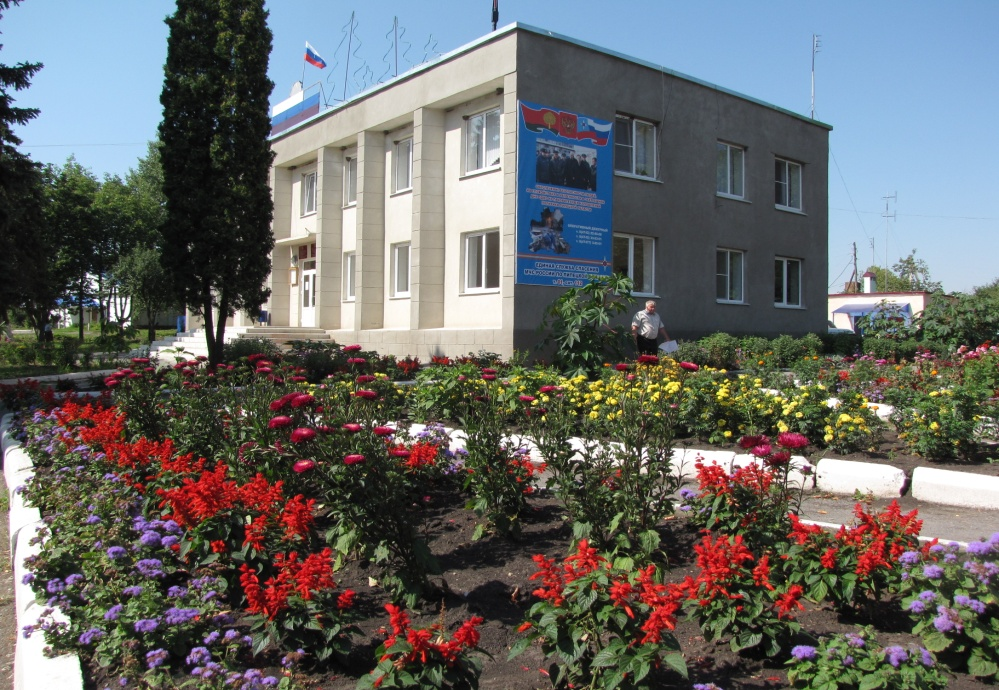
- The administration of rural settlement in Dmitryashevka
- Interactive map of Dmitryashevka
- Location of Dmitryashevka Dmitryashevka (Lipetsk Oblast)
- Coordinates: 52°8′48″N 39°3′23″E
- Country: Russia
- Federal subject: Lipetsk Oblast
- Administrative district: Khlevensky District
- SelsovietSelsoviet: Dmitryashevsky
- Founded: 1630—1659

Government
  - Head of rural settlement: Dedov Aleksandr Viktorovich
- Elevation: 160 m (520 ft)

Population (2010 Census)
  - Total: 1,570
  - Estimate (2010): 1,570 (0%)

Municipal status
  - Municipal district: Khlevensky Municipal District
  - Urban settlement: Dmitryashevka Rural Settlement
  - Capital of: Khlevensky Municipal District, Dmitryashevka Rural Settlement
- Time zone: UTC+3 (MSK)
- Postal code: 399250
- OKTMO ID: 42652416101
- Website: дмитряшевка-48.рф

Dmitryashevka (Russian: Дмитря́шевка, Dmitryashevka) is a village (English: selo, Russian: село́) of Khlevensky District in the Lipetsk Oblast, Russia. It stands on the right bank of the Don River. Through the village passes highway Khlevnoye – Fomino-Negatchyovka.

== Geography ==
The administrative center is located at a distance of 75 km from the city of Lipetsk and 9 km – from the district center Khlevnoye. Total area Dmitryashevka rural settlement is 8806 hectares. Bordered Otskotchnoye settlement, Fomino-Negatchyovka, Lower Kolybelka, Upper Kolybelka, Khlevnoye settlement.

In the north-west of the village adjacent Gudovka.

== History ==
It formed originally from the neighboring village of Khlevnoye in the middle of the seventeenth century as well. The name of the village comes from the name of the first settler – Dmitriy Rodionov, according to the documents first mention of it belongs to the seventeenth century (1630–1659 years).

In 1811 have built a church in honor of Protection of the Holy Virgin, the congregation numbered to 2010 people. According to the archives, with the 1848 and there parochial school.

Until 1956 and Dmitryashevka was the center of Dmitryashevka district.

Dmitryashevka rural settlement is in the northern part Khlevensky District Lipetsk Oblast with administrative center in the village of Dmitryashevka.

On the territory of the settlement is dominated by chernozem type of soil.
