= Khlevny =

Khlevny (Russian: Хлевный; masculine), Khlevnaya (Хлевная; feminine), or Khlevnoye (Хлевное; neuter) is the name of several rural localities in Russia:

- Khlevnoye, Lipetsk Oblast, a selo in Khlevensky Selsoviet of Khlevensky District of Lipetsk Oblast
- Khlevnoye, Ryazan Oblast, a village in Alyashevsky Rural Okrug of Zakharovsky District of Ryazan Oblast
