= Mihail Popovici =

Mihail Popovici (born 29 October 1942) is a Moldovan cardiologist, academician, and professor who has contributed to cardiovascular medicine, research, and public health reform in Moldova. He is a full member of the Academy of Sciences of Moldova and has played a central role in the modernization of cardiology services and research both nationally and internationally.

== Education ==
Popovici graduated from the Nicolae Testemițanu State University of Medicine and Pharmacy, earning his Doctor of Medicine degree in 1965 and PhD in 1970. He later was awarded a Doctor of Science degree in 1986 from the National Medical Research Center of Cardiology in Moscow. He was awarded the title of university professor in cardiology by the Supreme Attestation Commission of the USSR in 1990.

== Professional and academic leadership ==
Popovici began his academic career as an assistant and lecturer of biochemistry at the Nicolae Testemițanu State University of Medicine and Pharmacy between 1965–1976. In 1977, he was entrusted with founding the Laboratory of Cardiology Research at the institution, which quickly evolved into a major clinical-experimental sector under his leadership.

Popovici was the founding director of the Moldavian Institute of Cardiology in Chișinău, from 1984 to 2014, establishing it as a leading center for cardiovascular research and clinical care. He then became the Deputy Director of Science at the Institute. Popovici also led the Institute for Preventive and Clinical Medicine, formed by merging several research institutions, from 1988 to 1997.

== Scientific contributions and research ==
Popovici is credited with founding a scientific school of cardiology in Moldova, focusing on both experimental and clinical aspects of cardiovascular diseases. He has been a leader in public health initiatives, notably as a national coordinator of the Countrywide Integrated Noncommunicable Diseases Intervention (CINDI) program in Moldova since 1991, focusing on the prevention and management of chronic diseases.

Popovici's research interests include: pathogenesis, diagnosis, and treatment of toxic and dilated cardiomyopathy, physiopathology of congestive heart failure and ventricular remodeling, study of ischemic heart disease, coronary restenosis, and atherosclerotic plaque, and impact of environmental toxins, particularly pesticides, on cardiac health. He introduced the concept of cardiomyopathies, which gained international recognition, and contributed to the development of new diagnostic and therapeutic approaches for various cardiovascular conditions.

== Publications and innovation ==
Popoivici authored over 600 scientific publications, including 20 monographs, compendia, and clinical guidelines and is the holder of 17 patents, with several inventions awarded medals at international exhibitions. He has led 21 research projects at a national level and 7 internationally, and has supervised more than 20 doctoral and postdoctoral theses.

== National and international recognition ==
Popovici is an academician of the Academy of Sciences of Moldova. He has also been awarded the Moldovan Laureate of the State Prize for science, technology, and production in 1994 and the Order of the Republic, Moldova's highest award, in 2002.

== Public service and professional activities ==
Popovici has contributed to public health policy and education as a Member of Moldovan Parliament between 1990–1994, when he voted for the Declaration of Independence and served on the Health and Social Assistance Committee. He was also a Member of the National Council for Accreditation and Attestation between 2014–2017 and the President of the Moldovan Society of Cardiology as well as an active participant in European and global congresses of cardiology, often as a speaker and session moderator.
