= Mikhail Boldyrev =

Soviet politician (1894–1939)

- Михаил Болдырев
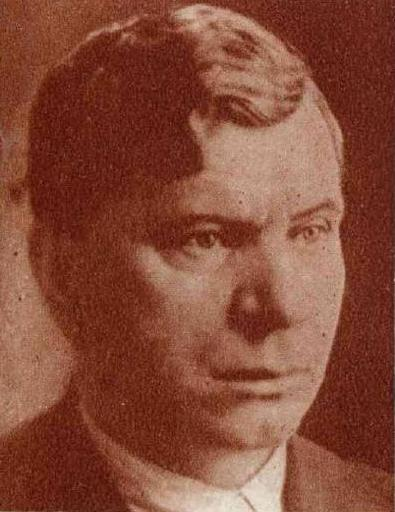

People's Commissar of Health of the USSR
- In office 2 August 1937 – 16 July 1938
- Premier: Vyacheslav Molotov
- Preceded by: Grigory Kaminsky
- Succeeded by: Nikolai Grashchenkov

Member of the Supreme Soviet of the USSR
- In office 1937–1946

Personal details
- Born: Missing required parameter 1=month! 1894 Zadonsky Uyezd Russian Empire
- Died: 25 February 1939 (aged 44–45) Moscow, Russian SFSR, Soviet Union
- Resting place: Donskoye Cemetery
- Party: RSDLP (Bolsheviks); Russian Communist Party (1918–1937)

Mikhail Fyodorovich Boldyrev (Russian: Михаил Фёдорович Болдырев; 1894–1939) was a Soviet politician who served in various positions in the Soviet state and party apparatus including as People's Commissar for Health.

== Biography ==
Born in October 1894 in the village of Arkhangelskiye Borki, Zadonsky Uyezd, Voronezh Governorate (now Lipetsk District, Lipetsk Oblast), to a family of farmers. He graduated from the Zadonsk City School in 1909.

In 1909–1910, he worked in a store. In 1910–1912, he worked as a clerk's apprentice, clerk, and sales assistant in stores in Voronezh, Yelets, Rostov-on-Don, and Taganrog. From 1912–1915, he worked as a machine operator, wagon driver, and stone quarryman in the Donbas mines. In 1914, he was arrested for participating in the revolutionary movement, but was immediately released. In 1915, he graduated from the school for military paramedics. From 1915 to 1917, he served as a senior medical assistant in the Tsarist army.

He was a member of the RSDLP(b) since 1917. From 1917 to 1919, he was chairman of the Zadonsk District Executive Committee. He participated in the suppression of the Left Socialist Revolutionary uprising in Moscow in 1918. From 1919 to 1922, he was a member of the Voronezh Provincial Executive Committee, chairman of the Ostrogozhsk District Revolutionary Committee, member of the Voronezh Provincial Revolutionary Committee, secretary and deputy chairman of the Voronezh Provincial Executive Committee. From 1922 to 1924, he was deputy chairman of the Don Regional Executive Committee.

From 1924 to 1928, he was secretary of the Council of People's Commissars of the RSFSR.

In December 1928–1929, he was chairman of the Yaroslavl Provincial Executive Committee. From 1929 to 1930, he was Chairman of the Yaroslavl District Executive Committee. From 1930 to 1931, he was Deputy Director of the Yaroslavl Rubber Plant.

From 1931 to 1932, he was Secretary of the Moscow Regional Executive Committee. From 1932 to 1937, he was Head of the Moscow Regional Department of Health.

From 1937 to 1938, he was People's Commissar of Health of the USSR. He was a member of the 5th Central Executive Committee of the USSR and a deputy of the 1st convocation of the Supreme Soviet of the USSR.

He was arrested on July 16, 1938 and was convicted and executed on February 25, 1939. He was rehabilitated on April 9, 1955.
