= Peter Herzen =

Soviet surgeon, and one of the pioneers of oncology in the USSR

- Пётр Герцен
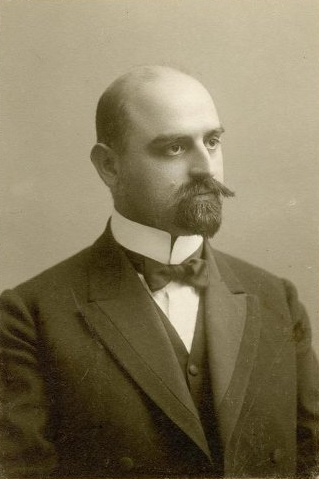
- Herzen in the early years of his medical practice
- Born: Peter Alexandrovich Herzen; 20 May 1871; Florence, Kingdom of Italy
- Died: 2 January 1947 (aged 75); Moscow, Soviet Union
- Education: University of Lausanne; Imperial Moscow University
- Known for: Founder of a major surgical school, one of the founders of Russian oncology, organiser of healthcare in the USSR
- Awards: Order of the Red Banner of Labour (twice); Medal "For the Defence of Moscow"; Medal "For Valiant Labour in the Great Patriotic War 1941–1945"; Honoured Scientist of the RSFSR; Badge of Excellence in Healthcare (USSR)
- Scientific career
- Fields: Medicine, surgery, oncology
- Workplaces: Imperial Moscow University; Staro-Yekaterinenskaya Hospital; Moscow State University (Medical Faculty); Morozov Institute for the Treatment of Tumours; 1st Moscow Medical Institute
- Academic advisors: César Roux

Peter Alexandrovich Herzen (Russian: Пётр Александрович Герцен; 20 May 1871 – 2 January 1947) was a Soviet surgeon, doctor of medicine, healthcare manager, and professor. He was also one of the pioneers of oncology in the USSR.

He was the son of the Swiss physiologist Alexander Alexandrovich Herzen and the grandson of the Russian publicist, writer, and philosopher Alexander Ivanovich Herzen.

Herzen was the head of the Department of Operative Surgery at the 1st Moscow State University from 1919 to 1921, the head of the Department of General Surgery at the First Moscow State University from 1921 to 1934, the head of the Department of Hospital Surgery at the 1st Moscow Medical Institute from 1934 to 1947, the director of the Institute for the Treatment of Tumors from 1922 to 1934, a corresponding member of the Academy of Sciences of the Soviet Union (1939), an Honored Scientist of the RSFSR (1934), an honorary member of the French Academy of Surgery, a member of the International Society of Surgeons, a member of the Higher Attestation Commission, the chairman of the boards of the All-Russian and All-Union Societies of Surgeons from 1926 to 1928 and from 1935 to 1936, and chairman of the XXI (1929) and XXIV (1938) All-Union Congresses of Surgeons.

After his death in 1947, the Moscow Research Institute of Oncology was named after him.

== Biography ==
=== Origins and education ===
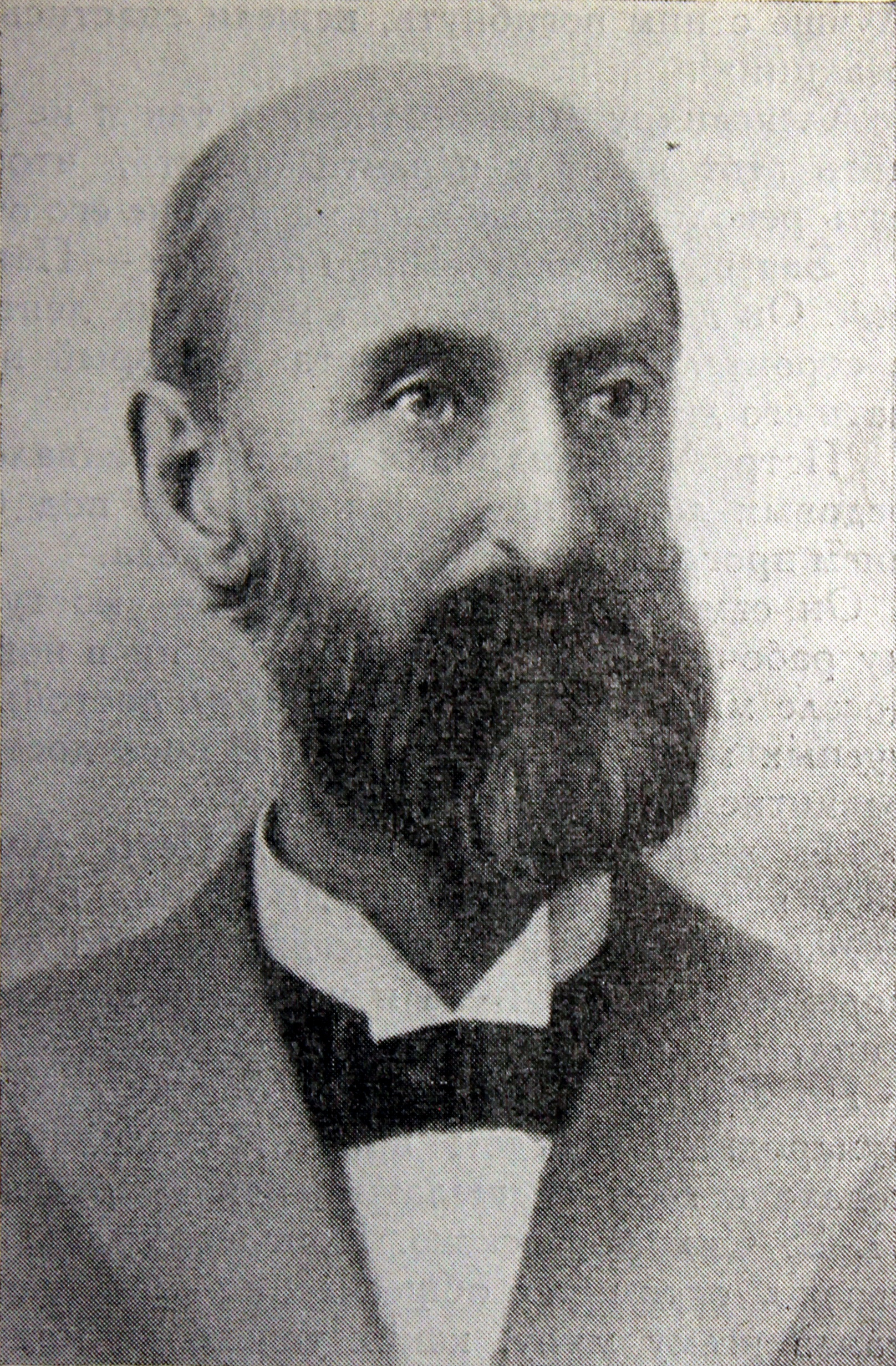
A. A. Herzen — father

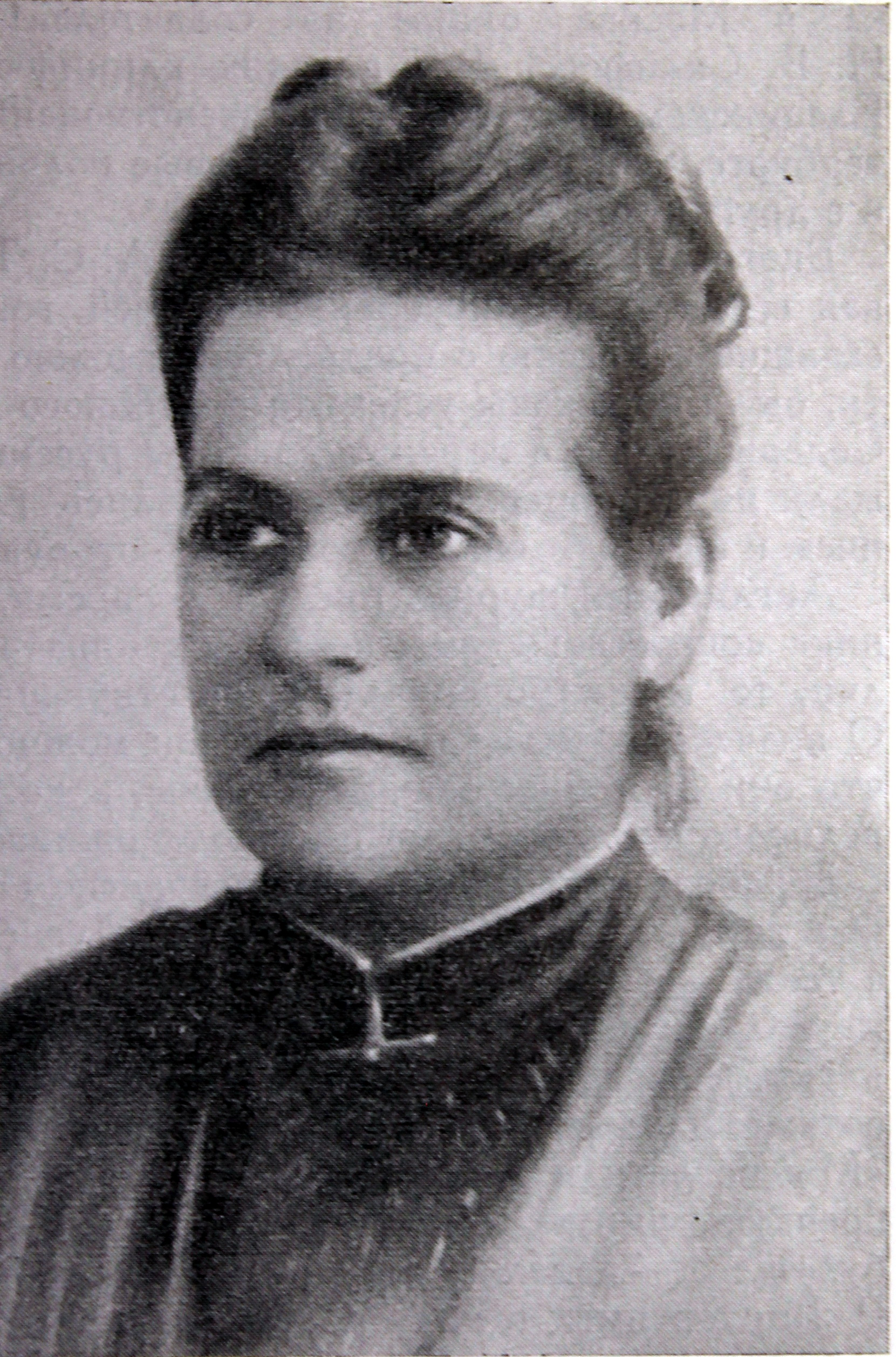
Thérèse (Teresina) Félici — mother

Peter Alexandrovich Herzen was born on May 8, 1871 in Florence, Kingdom of Italy, into the family of the Swiss physiologist of Russian origin Alexander Alexandrovich Herzen and the daughter of a peasant, the Italian Thérèse (Toreze) Félici (Thérèse Félici, 1851–1927). Besides Peter, the family had nine more children: three girls and six boys. He was the grandson of the Russian publicist, writer, and philosopher Alexander Ivanovich Herzen.

In 1896, Peter Alexandrovich graduated from the medical faculty of the University of Lausanne, where he attended lectures by professors such as Kaufmann, Heinrich Stilling, Roth, Bumm, after which he worked for one year as an unsalaried assistant in the clinic of the Swiss surgeon César Roux. At the same time, he conducted researhes in his father's physiological laboratory at the University of Lausanne. Just one year after graduating from university, Herzen successfully defended his dissertation in Lausanne for the degree of Doctor of Medicine titled On the Causes of Death after Bilateral Vagotomy in Their Relation to Survival Conditions, based on extensive experimental material and receiving positive reviews in the specialized literature.

=== After moving to the Russian Empire ===
In 1897, after declining César Roux's offer of a staff assistant position in the clinic, Herzen moved to Russia, as his grandfather had willed. (Note: Peter Alexandrovich Herzen was the only one of Alexander Ivanovich Herzen’s descendants to fulfill the latter’s dying wish to return to Russia.) Quickly learning Russian (that he did not know), (Note: Throughout the rest of his life, P. A. Herzen spoke with a noticeable French accent, sometimes misplacing the stress in words.) he enrolled as an auditor in the fifth year of the medical faculty of Moscow University. In December 1898, P. A. Herzen received his Russian diploma as a physician with honors, having passed state examinations for the entire university course. That same year, Peter Alexandrovich began working as an extern physician (Note: In the Russian Empire (before 1917) — a non-staff physician who worked for free in a hospital or some other institution for the purpose of gaining practical experience.) at the Old Catherine's Hospital under the guidance of the Moscow surgeon and experienced educator I. D. Sarychev, a student of N. V. Sklifosovsky. He worked in this clinic first as an extern physician (until 1900), then as a resident of the surgical department (until 1920) for 22 years (with interruptions for military service as a military surgeon), acquiring vast practical experience and surgical skill here. At the same time as Herzen, talented surgeons such as V. N. Rozanov and V. M. Mints studied and worked at Old Catherine's Hospital. During 1904–1905, in the Russo-Japanese War, as a military surgeon with the Moscow detachment, he spent 14 months on the Manchurian front. In 1909, Herzen defended his second doctoral dissertation Experimental Study on the Effect on the Kidneys of Substances Arising in the Blood during Immunization of Animals with Renal Tissue or Damage to One Kidney, and in 1910 he was elected privatdozent of the faculty surgical clinic of Moscow University, headed by Professor I. K. Spizharny. During World War I, he served as a surgeon in the active army.

=== After the October Revolution ===
After the October Revolution, Peter Alexandrovich's wife left for Italy with their three children, but he did not follow them. In 1919, P. A. Herzen was elected as the head of the Department of Operative Surgery at the 1st Moscow State University, which became vacant after the departure of Professor F. A. Rein. There, he revised the operative surgery program, basing it on the physiological justification of applied surgical treatment methods. Since 1920, he simultaneously lectured on operative surgery at the 2nd Moscow State University, heading that department from 1920 to 1922. During the Russian Civil War, P. A. Herzen served as a consultant to the 151st military hospital (1920–1921). In 1921, he was elected head of the Department of General Surgery at the 1st Moscow State University, which in 1922 was transferred to the base of the Institute for the Treatment of Tumors (now the Moscow Research Institute of Oncology named after P. A. Herzen). Since that moment, Peter Alexandrovich headed both the department and the institute, remaining its director until 1934. Despite his high position, Herzen personally consulted a large number of outpatients daily at the institute's polyclinic, performed many complex operations, and conducted detailed clinical rounds; he could spend hours working at the microscope, studying blood pictures in patients with systemic diseases of the hematopoietic organs. In 1926, Herzen was first elected chairman of the Moscow Surgical Society, and in 1929 — chairman of the XXI Congress of Russian Surgeons. After the death of Professor A. V. Martynov in 1934, Herzen became head of the Department of Hospital Surgery at the 1st Moscow Medical Institute (now the First Moscow State Medical University), which he led until the end of his life. In 1934, he was awarded the honorary title of Honoured Scientist of the RSFSR, and on January 29, 1939, he was elected a corresponding member of the Academy of Sciences of the Soviet Union in the Department of Mathematical and Natural Sciences, specialty "Surgery".

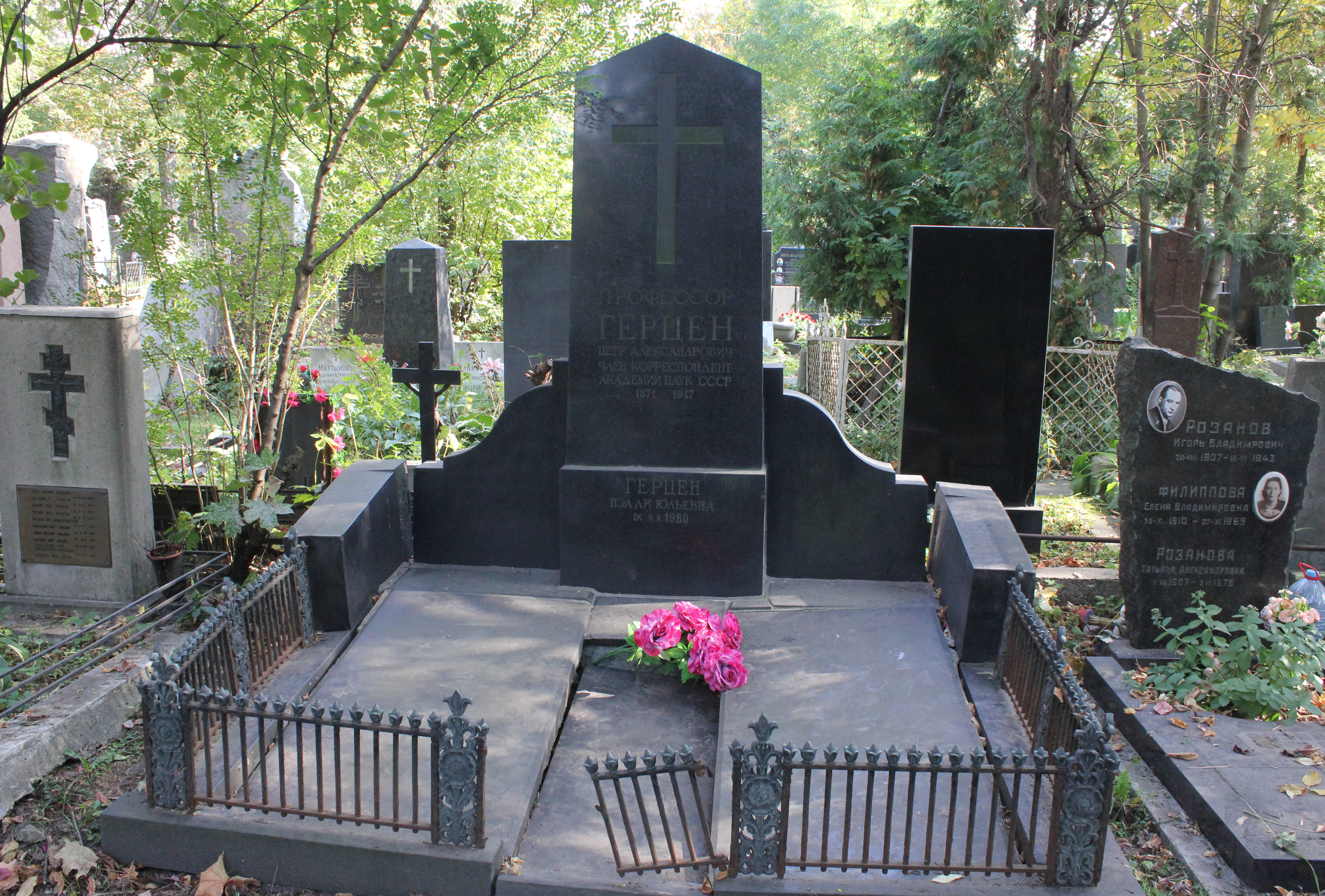
Grave of Herzen at Novodevichy Cemetery in Moscow.

During the Great Patriotic War, P. A. Herzen remained in Moscow throughout, operating on and treating the wounded, and was awarded the Medal "For Valiant Labour in the Great Patriotic War 1941–1945".

P. A. Herzen died on January 2, 1947, in Moscow after a serious illness. He is buried at Novodevichy Cemetery, plot No. 4.

== Contributions to Russian medicine ==
Peter Alexandrovich Herzen authored about 100 scientific works, including 5 monographs. Among them, particularly significant are the works On the Technique of Cholecystenterostomy (1903), Surgical Treatment of Traumatic Aneurysms (1911), Introduction to the Clinic of Surgical Forms of Cancer (1930), Breast Cancer (1930), and On Hemorrhages (1940). Herzen proposed 16 original methods and modifications of surgical operations, including the operation for forming an artificial presternal esophagus from the small intestine (1907), cholecystectomy, intraperitoneal fixation of the rectum in cases of its prolapse, operations for femoral hernias, anterior cerebral hernias, closure of fistulas of the parotid salivary gland, and others. As a surgeon with a broad scope, Herzen made a substantial contribution to the study and development of problems in the surgical treatment of diseases of the abdominal cavity organs, blood vessels, as well as oncological, urological, and cardiac surgical issues. He gained wide recognition after the publication of his works Skull Fractures in Children, On Suppuration in Typhoid Fever, and On Heart Suture in Its Wounding.

=== In abdominal surgery ===
At the II Congress of Russian Surgeons in 1901, he reported on his modification of cholecystoenterostomy: after transecting the jejunum, its distal end was connected to the gallbladder, while the proximal end was sutured into the side of the jejunum below the anastomosis, which prevented the development of ascending cholangitis.

In 1913, P. A. Herzen was the first to perform omentorenopexy — a surgical operation consisting of wrapping the lower pole of the kidney with the omentum and suturing it to the renal capsule. This operation is used in ascites caused by portal hypertension.

In his dispute with the advocate of gastroenterostomy in the treatment of peptic ulcer of the stomach, V. V. Uspensky, Herzen argued for the advantages of gastrectomy.

The clinic of hospital surgery at the 1st Moscow Medical Institute, headed by P. A. Herzen, effectively developed issues in the surgical treatment of diseases of the biliary tract. At the 5th Regional Conference of Surgeons of the Moscow Region (1934), reporting on biliary duct surgery, Herzen advocated early cholecystectomy as the operation of choice, abandoning cholecystostomy, of which he had long been a proponent. In his article Surgery of the Biliary Tract, he detailed the pathology of the gallbladder and biliary ducts, thoroughly discussed various types of surgical interventions, and emphasized the need for early cholecystectomy before the development of severe complications. P. A. Herzen supplemented the classification of S. P. Fyodorov (in particular, dividing chronic recurrent cholecystitis into uncomplicated and complicated forms) with dyskinetic forms and proposed the term "initial forms of cholecystitis" instead of diagnoses such as "hydrops of the gallbladder" and "sclerosing cholecystitis".

Herzen spoke at surgical congresses of various levels on numerous occasions, and his reports were devoted to issues of surgical treatment of spleen diseases. In 1924, at the XVI Congress of Russian Surgeons, he delivered a report On the Surgical Treatment of Certain Forms of Splenomegaly; a similar report was made in 1925 at the XXXIV Congress of French Surgeons, and in 1926 at the XVIII Congress of Russian Surgeons (On Spleen Diseases in Connection with Indications for Splenectomy and Its Long-Term Results). In these presentations, he pointed to the hemolytic role of the spleen and its ability to accumulate "blood poisons". In many spleen diseases, the severity of which is determined by dysfunction or hyperfunction of this organ, the patient's condition can be alleviated by its removal. He was the first in the Soviet Union to perform splenectomy for hemorrhagic diathesis.

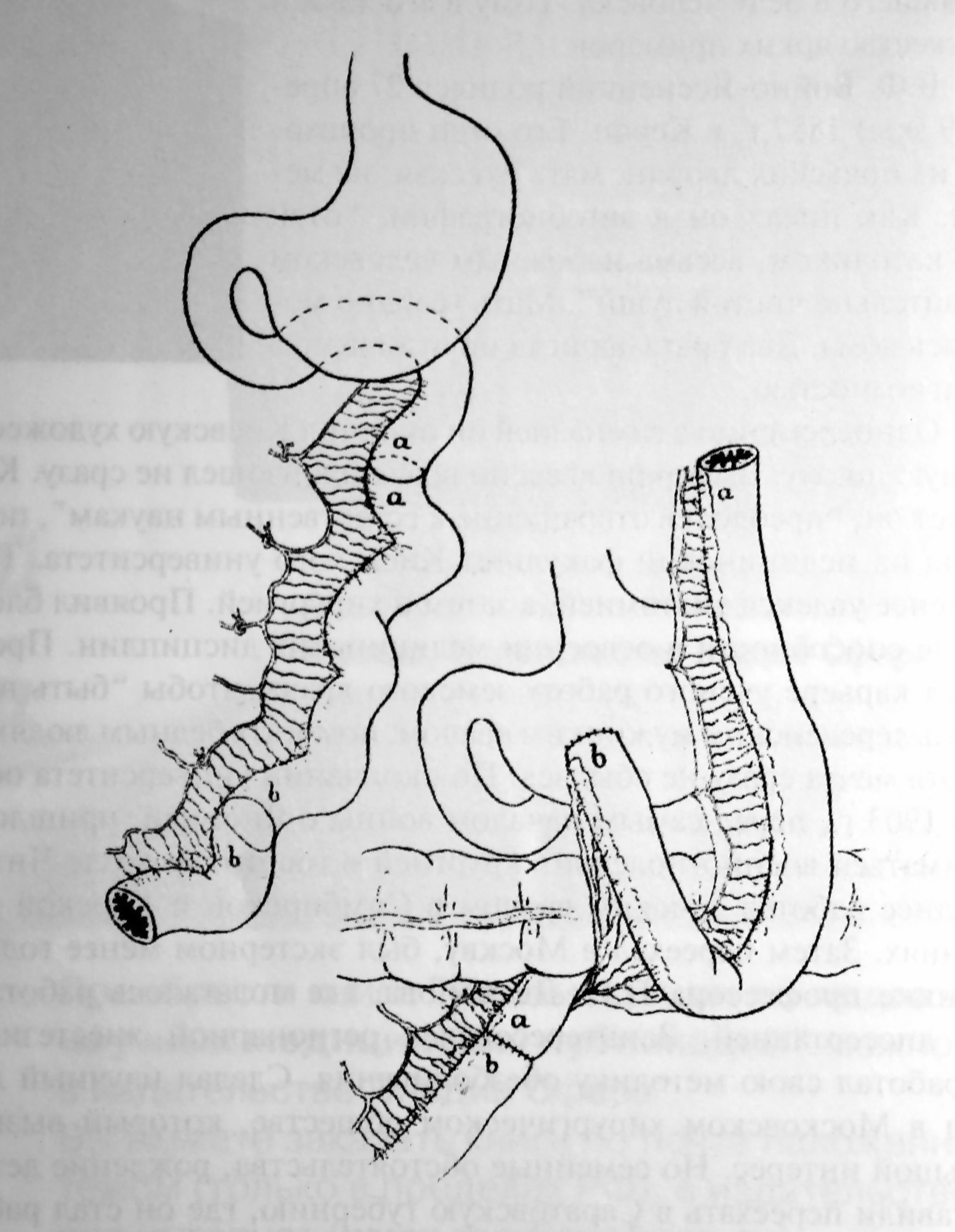
Schematic of the Roux—Herzen operation, published by César Roux in the journal Le Semaine Médicale in January 1907

In the late 1930s, Herzen wrote an extensive article on chronic appendicitis and pseudoappendicitis, noting the difficulty in diagnosing chronic appendicitis due to the fact that in practice surgeons often encounter not inflammation of the appendix itself, but inflammatory changes in the cecum (typhlitis, typhlocolitis) and spastic conditions of the ascending colon, ileocecal valve. Herzen expressed the opinion that as these diseases simulating appendicitis are properly studied, the term "pseudoappendicitis" should disappear from medical usage. He also drew attention to the fact that involvement of the appendix is often secondary, while the primary problem lies in changes in the cecum (its atony, dilatation, excessive mobility) with involvement of the sympathetic nervous system in the pathological process, and warned surgeons against narrow and one-sided interpretation of chronic pain in the right iliac region as a symptom complex of chronic appendicitis.

=== In thoracic surgery ===
Chronology of P. A. Herzen's performance of the stages of the first successful presternal small intestine esophageal plasty

September 10, 1907 — Stage I: mobilization of a segment of small intestine and advancement to the neck, with ligation of 3 mesenteric arteries;

October 4, 1907 (24 days later) — Stage II: intestinal transplant sutured into the stomach, with resection of about 20 cm of intestinal tube in the epigastrium; the stomach was small and pulled posteriorly; implantation of the intestine performed near the middle of the lesser curvature on the anterior wall of the stomach;

November 17, 1907 (44 days later) — Stage III: anastomosis between the esophagus and intestine on the neck, with mobilization of the intestine over 15 cm; its end obliquely refreshed; esophagus isolated and transected, lower end closed tightly, upper end slightly incised laterally and longitudinally, then connected to the intestine.

On the 8th day after the operation, an esophageal fistula formed, requiring insertion of a gutta-percha probe through the mouth into the intestinal transplant for intensified feeding. On the 21st day the fistula closed, the probe was removed, and the patient began normal feeding.

At the VII Congress of Russian Surgeons (1907), P. A. Herzen reported on the operation for forming an artificial presternal esophagus in connection with its benign stricture. This operation was first proposed by the Swiss surgeon César Roux in 1906 to replace the natural esophagus. After performing the initial stages (forming a transplant from the small intestine and advancing it through a subcutaneous tunnel to the base of the neck), due to the patient's cachexia, Roux postponed connecting the transplant to the esophagus to a later time, bringing the upper end of the intestine out to the skin as a jejunostomy. However, this patient required several reconstructive operations to connect the transplant to the esophagus in the neck; only in 1911 was Roux able to complete the plasty. The world's first successful completed total subcutaneous small intestine esophageal plasty was performed in Moscow by César Roux's student P. A. Herzen in three stages in September–November 1907 on a 20-year-old patient with post-burn stenosis of the esophagus resulting from sulfuric acid poisoning 6 months before the operation. (Note: Herzen's patient, who was the first to undergo successful esophageal reconstruction, lived for more than 30 years, returned to a normal life, and had children.) In his report to the Congress of Russian Surgeons, Herzen pointed out five difficult-to-resolve aspects of Roux's method and proposed ways to eliminate these drawbacks: first, divide the entire operation into 3 and not 2 stages: first advance the intestine to the neck, then suture it into the stomach, and finally connect it to the esophagus, significantly shortening the duration of the first stage performed on the most debilitated patients; second, pass the long upper segment of the mobilized intestine through a spacious opening created in the mesocolon and gastrocolic ligament into the upper floor of the abdominal cavity, and from there through a tunnel under the skin to the neck. This operation became known in domestic and foreign medical literature as the Roux—Herzen operation.

My dear colleague!

I've just seen your mother today and got your address, and I hasten to sincerely congratulate you on this splendid success.

I am very glad that students surpass their teachers and rejoice at the opportunity to tell you so: You know that all your successes will always find a sympathetic response in Lausanne...

(From a letter by César Roux to P. A. Herzen)

For many years afterward, attempts by other domestic and foreign surgeons to repeat the Roux—Herzen operation were mostly unsuccessful.

In 1925, P. A. Herzen performed the first thoracoscopy in the USSR for chronic empyema of the pleura.

=== In oncology ===
Upon assuming the position of director of the Institute for the Treatment of Tumors, P. A. Herzen carried out a significant reorganization, establishing major radium-X-ray and hematology departments, as well as experimental, clinical, and anatomical pathology laboratories, thereby elevating this medical institution — where patients with oncopathology received care in accordance with modern scientific standards — to a leading position in the USSR. The number of operations increased threefold, while mortality decreased from 45% to 10%. Under Herzen's leadership, large-scale research was conducted at the institute on transplantation of tumors, development of immunity to them, and other areas of experimental oncology. A series of Herzen's works were devoted to oncological problems, in which he examined theoretical and practical aspects of treating malignant tumors, emphasizing the role of precancerous diseases as well as exogenous and endogenous factors in their development, the dependence of the degree of malignancy on the patient's age and sex, and the nature of the neoplasm. Herzen's highly valuable works on lip cancer and tongue cancer stand out. In 1930, his scientific works Introduction to the Clinic of Surgical Forms of Cancer, Cancer of the Ampulla of Vater, and Breast Cancer were published. Breast cancer was the subject of a separate chapter in the 1937 book Malignant Neoplasms published in Kyiv, where Herzen presented his many years of experience in this field and proposed distinguishing 4 stages of breast cancer, based on which he substantiated a scheme for cancer prevention on a national scale. In his works on oncology, Herzen constantly emphasized the importance of early diagnosis of malignant neoplasms and timely surgical intervention. While an advocate of the surgical method for treating cancer patients, Herzen was at the same time opposed to expanding surgical operations in advanced tumor processes and believed that this issue should be resolved individually, taking into account the stage of the process, histological form and location of the tumor, patient's age, and peculiarities of the clinical course of the disease. During these years, P. A. Herzen and his institute staff intensively addressed issues of treating esophageal cancer, cervical cancer, colorectal cancer, introduced electrosurgery for tumor removal, investigated the effects of radiation therapy methods in treating malignant neoplasms of various localizations, and studied the lymphatic system of the stomach in health and cancer. Significant attention was paid to combined treatment of malignant tumors, prevention of cancer, and precancerous conditions.

P. A. Herzen was convinced that effective treatment of oncology patients required widespread health education of the population and active participation of healthcare authorities. He initiated the establishment in Moscow in 1930 of a special committee to develop regulations for the Moscow Oncology Organization. Herzen delivered lectures in many cities, insisted on organizing 9 oncology stations in Moscow, obliging institute staff to serve as district oncologists, and achieved the opening of branches in Ryazan, Tula, Kolomna, and several other cities. At the same time, he initiated the holding of "Anti-Cancer Week" and the 1st Regional Oncology Conference. Peter Alexandrovich and his staff began delivering lectures on oncology issues for physicians of major preventive medical institutions in the Moscow Oblast. Herzen emphasized the importance of strict registration and statistics of oncological diseases, creation of specialized medical institutions (oncological dispensaries), training of oncologist physicians, and raising the qualifications of general practitioners in oncology.

=== In cardiovascular surgery ===
Drawing on his experience treating wounded patients with blood vessel injuries during the Russo-Japanese War of 1904–1905, P. A. Herzen wrote the monograph Surgical Treatment of Traumatic Aneurysms Based on Observations from the Russo-Japanese War and Subsequent Years (1911), which became the first Russian book to most comprehensively cover this problem. In this monograph, he most fully for his time described the symptomatology of aneurysms, disease course, possible complications, indications and contraindications for surgical operation, determining surgeons' tactics for vascular injuries in military field surgery conditions, and detailed methods of corresponding operative interventions. Herzen was one of the first to ligature not only the artery but also the accompanying vein during ligation to prevent gangrene of the limb. Among his scientific works, special attention is deserved by the monograph On Hemorrhages (1940), which presented the latest data of the time on hemostasis, the significance of heparin, thrombus formation, as well as described a number of technical features playing a major role in vessel ligation and proposed an original transperitoneal method of ligating renal vessels. During ligation of a large arterial trunk performed for its traumatic injury, Herzen recommended excising this trunk along the wounded segment or removing the corresponding sympathetic trunk ganglia along the spine, which significantly improves blood circulation and optimizes trophism of the affected limb. P. A. Herzen explained in detail to surgeons — readers of the monograph — what tactics to follow in injuries to large vessels of the skull, oral cavity, lungs, abdominal organs, and other localizations. In addition, the monograph focused surgeons' attention on secondary hemorrhages in severe putrefactive processes and provided recommendations on this issue, which proved invaluable during the Great Patriotic War, when military field surgeons encountered the problem of secondary hemorrhages in putrefactive inflammation of wounds.

Herzen also prepared works On Pericardiotomy and On the Casuistry of Heart Wounds. He was one of the first in Russia to suture the myocardium in heart wounds: two operations for heart wounds were performed by him in 1902. He published his experience in this field in 1904, thoroughly analyzing issues of diagnosing heart wounds and technical features of operative intervention. Among other recommendations, Herzen justified the possibility of luxating the heart into the wound and fixing it by the surgeon's hand. Herzen applied an active tactic in treating purulent pericarditis, which remained relevant for a long time after his works.

At the IX Pirogov Congress in 1904, Herzen proposed completely removing the bony part of the chest wall in the precordial region during operations for heart wounds, viewing this as prevention of heart compression in case of possible development of adhesive pericarditis in the future.

=== In urology ===
In 1906, at the VI Congress of Russian Surgeons, Herzen reported on the technique of transvesical prostatectomy. In 1907, he published a clinical case of surgical treatment of gunshot injury to renal vessels and liver: surgical intervention on both organs achieved complete recovery of the patient. That same year, he performed a rare urological operation — pelvioureteral plasty for remitting hydronephrosis — with very good results (this operation by Herzen was the 14th in world literature). In his doctoral dissertation defended in 1909, Experimental Study on the Effect on the Kidneys of Substances Arising in the Blood during Immunization of Animals with Renal Tissue or Damage to One Kidney, Herzen pointed to the connection between his research and conclusions on nephrolysins and nephrotoxins with problems of renal surgery: he considered ligation of the ureter without simultaneous removal of the kidney unacceptable, as nephrotoxins formed in the atrophying kidney exert a toxic effect on the healthy kidney.

=== In surgery of the autonomic nervous and endocrine systems ===
In his dissertation defended in Lausanne in 1897 for the degree of Doctor of Medicine, On the Causes of Death after Bilateral Vagotomy in Their Relation to Survival Conditions, based on extensive experimental material, Herzen shed light on many unclear questions at the time regarding the role of sectioning the vagus nerves in their various divisions and the influence of sectioning on the functioning of the gastrointestinal tract, as well as the permissibility of such sectioning. P. A. Herzen clarified the consequences of vagotomy, among which he noted significant dilatation and atony of the stomach, leading animals to death without gastric lavage or imposition of a gastrostomy. Analyzing data from studies by Bernard (1858), Contejeon (1892), Krechl (1892), and his own observations, Herzen concluded that in addition to impaired gastric motility in vagotomized animals, their digestive activity is reduced. Vagotomy at the neck level has no direct effect on abdominal organs but noticeably influences heart and lung function. Sectioning of the vagus nerves at the level of the lower esophageal sphincter or within the thoracic cavity usually does not lead to death.

In nephroptosis, Herzen removed the aorto-renal sympathetic ganglion simultaneously with nephropexy, obtaining good treatment results; he performed removal of sympathetic nerves of the ileocolic artery for partial denervation of the cecum and elimination of pain associated with mobile cecum and primary chronic appendicitis. P. A. Herzen was the first in the Soviet Union to perform operations for heart failure and angina pectoris, performing subtotal thyroidectomy and removing sympathetic ganglia in the neck, which reduced the intensity of metabolic processes in the body and decreased oxygen consumption by the myocardium, thereby easing the work of the diseased heart. Herzen performed surgical interventions on the brain and spinal cord; in spontaneous gangrene, he performed epinephrectomy, ganglionectomy, and neurotomy. P. A. Herzen wrote the work On the Surgical Treatment of Acromegaly. In diffuse toxic goiter, Herzen performed removal of the stellate ganglion.

=== In anesthesiology ===
P. A. Herzen paid great attention to the development of issues in local anesthesia. In 1901, he conducted studies on the use of conduction anesthesia, and from that moment preferred the simultaneous application of conduction and infiltration anesthesia for local anesthesia of the traumatized focus to be operated on, which allowed better results. At the same time, Herzen was not an advocate of only one anesthesia method, believing that in more complex cases, when it is necessary to operate on several wounds of different localizations or perform a more complex operation, preference should be given to general anesthesia; moreover, narcosis eliminates the danger of developing secondary shock. In the work Narcosis and Anesthesia, he thoroughly expounds the advantages of intravenous narcosis using barbiturate preparations hexobarbital and pronarcon.

== Scientific school and pedagogical activity ==
P. A. Herzen conducted extensive pedagogical work from 1910 until his death in 1947. He was the first in attempting to introduce new forms of teaching operative surgery and topographic anatomy, as he was convinced that a purely anatomical presentation of operative surgery did not fully meet the modern requirements of medical science: a surgeon must know what functional disorders may result even from a technically flawless operation performed by him. Thanks to these views, a physiological direction became established in the department he headed in the teaching of operative surgery, consisting in the physiological substantiation of the surgical treatment methods applied.

My teacher Peter Alexandrovich Herzen used to tell me, that a doctor should be fearless. And he demonstrated this quality by his own example. One of his urgent night operations remains etched in my memory. A patient with a greatly enlarged spleen was brought from another hospital, where they had not dared to remove the organ due to the risk of fatal bleeding. The enormous size of the spleen did not allow "access" to the blood vessels. Then Peter Alexandrovich isolated the splenic pedicle with his left hand and transected the vessels blindly. And when blood gushed out, he quickly closed the stream with his fingers, calmly, feeling his way deep inside by touch, sutured and ligated the artery and vein, each the thickness of a finger. With shining eyes he approached us from the operating table: "See, it is not the surgeon who fears blood, but blood that should fear the surgeon".

— B. V. Petrovsky on P. A. Herzen

He often performed surgeries surrounded by students and trainee physicians, believing that teaching should take place not only in the lecture hall, but also at the patient's bedside, in the operating theatre, dressing room or anatomical theatre. However, Herzen was also a well-regarded lecturer.

Peter Alexandrovich was not demanding, or rather indulgent, and I do not recall him ever making a more or less sharp remark to a doctor for an oversight in work, even if the latter deserved it. (A. M. Zabludovsky on P. A. Herzen)

Being an skilled surgeon-anatomist who amazed students and doctors with his knowledge, Herzen tried to instill his love for anatomy in students during lectures, practical classes, and in the operating room. He said:

A surgeon has no right to pick up a knife without knowing anatomy and the possible complications and their causes.

In the clinic, Herzen granted considerable independence and initiative to doctors in scientific work and was less demanding toward them. However, despite a certain liberalism toward young doctors, he remained influential through his surgical skills, research ideas, passion for surgery, and charisma.

P. A. Herzen created a major school of surgeons who studied a wide range of surgical issues: problems of vascular surgery, oncology, surgical diseases of the organs of the chest and abdominal cavity. Among his students are many renowned scientists, including the following: V. I. Astrakhan, E. L. Beryozov, Yu. M. Bomash, Ya. M. Bruskin, B. G. Egorov, K. D. Yesipov, I. S. Zhorov, A. M. Zabludovsky, P. I. Ilchenko, V. A. Ivanov, A. I. Kozhevnikov, G. E. Koritsky, F. M. Lampert, I. G. Lukomsky, N. P. Maslov, P. G. Melikhov, B. V. Milonov, L. M. Nisnevich, D. E. Odinov, G. E. Ostroverkhov, B. V. Petrovsky, L. N. Pozdnyakov, E. S. Rabinovich, G. A. Reynberg, A. I. Savitsky, V. M. Svyatukhin, S. R. Frenkel, A. N. Shabanov, E. S. Shakhabazyan. Herzen's school was always characterized by the forward-looking nature of its scientific directions and continuous progressive development. Many of Herzen's students worked in medical institutions in various parts of the Soviet Union, where they continued to develop relevant problems in surgery.

A. L. Myasnikov, who studied under him in the 1920s, recalled:

… another talented surgeon who, at our request, repeated operative surgery forgotten since the third year, P. A. Herzen —A. I. Herzen writer's grandson— loudly shouted in strange Russian (he was raised in France): "Don't be afraid of bleeding. What a beautiful picture. Press it with your finger —and that's it— slap!"

== Public activities ==
Herzen had authority among both national and foreign medical communities. He was a member of the Central Committee of the Medsantrud trade unions, the Scientific Council of the Ministry of Health of the USSR, and served as editor of the journals Khirurgiya and Novy Khirurgichesky Arkhiv. In 1934, Peter Alexandrovich headed the surgical section of the review committee for young medical scientists, organized by the Central Committee of the Komsomol (Komsomol CC). He was an honorary member of the French Academy of Surgery, a member of the International Society of Surgeons, and a member of the Higher Attestation Commission. Herzen was elected chairman of the boards of the All-Russian and All-Union Societies of Surgeons (1926–1928, 1935–1936), chairman of the 21st (1929) and 24th (1938) All-Union Congresses of Surgeons, which clearly demonstrates the official recognition of him as the head of domestic surgery of that period, as well as the high appreciation of his contributions to the country's medical community.

P. A. Herzen was the organizer of the "anti-cancer week" held in the Soviet Union in April 1930. At the same time, a special committee was established, which, in addition to Herzen himself, included V. N. Rozanov and V. R. Khesin. The committee developed the regulations for the Moscow Oncological Organization and held the first Moscow Oncological Conference, attended by a large number of scientists and practicing physicians, which marked the beginning of the systematic development in the USSR of the fight against malignant neoplasms with the involvement of physicians, government bodies, and the public.

== Awards and honours ==
- Two Orders of the Red Banner of Labour (7 May 1940; 10 June 1945)
- Medal "For the Defence of Moscow"
- Medal "For Valiant Labour in the Great Patriotic War 1941–1945"
- Badge of Excellence in Healthcare
- Honoured Scientist of the RSFSR (1934)

== Legacy ==
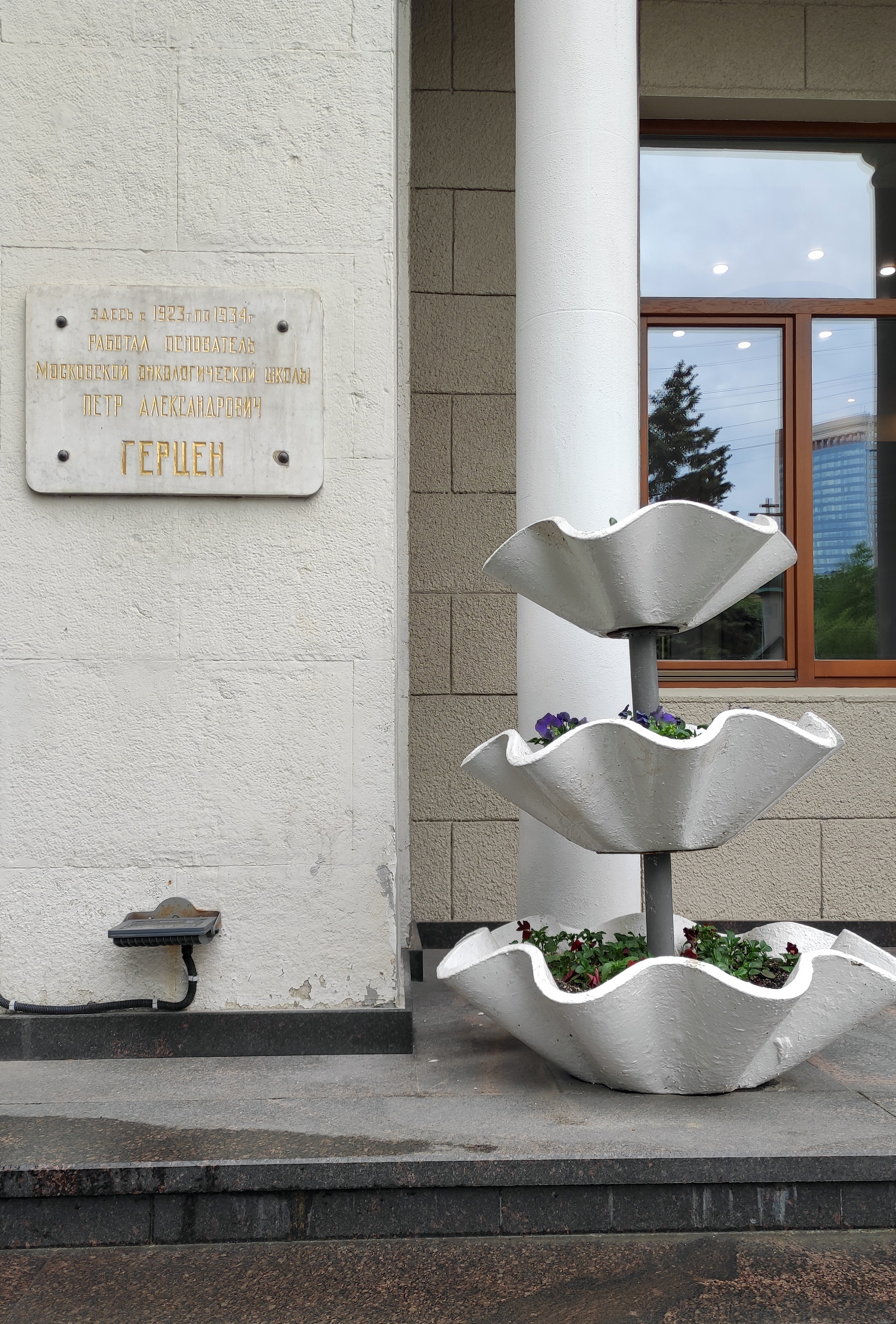
Memorial plaque in memory of P. A. Herzen in Moscow at 3 Second Botkinsky Proyezd

- In 1947, following P. A. Herzen's death, the Moscow Oncology Research Institute was named after him. A memorial plaque has been installed on the institute building at 3 Second Botkinsky Proyezd, bearing the inscription: "From 1923 to 1934, the founder of the Moscow oncological school, Peter Alexandrovich Herzen worked here". A bust of Herzen has been installed inside the institute building, and in Peter Alexandrovich's former operating room, efforts by contemporary physicians have recreated his office where the professor conducted his research and received patients; exhibits include a physician's bag with a set of medical instruments for house calls, surgical instruments, manuscripts, a significant number of personal belongings, his desk, armchair, lamp, leather sofa, and cabinets.
- A memorial plaque in his honour has been installed at the First Moscow State Medical University named after I. M. Sechenov.
- From the second half of 2012, the publishing house Media Sfera has been issuing the peer-reviewed scientific and practical medical journal Oncology. Journal named after P. A. Herzen, devoted to the issues of practical clinical oncology, the organisation of anti-cancer efforts, and the prevention of oncological diseases.
- In December 2023, a monument to Peter Alexandrovich Herzen was unveiled (sculptor: K. R. Chernyavsky) near the building of the Moscow Oncology Research Institute.

== Medical terms bearing the name of P. A. Herzen ==
- Herzen's approach in mastectomy: the skin incision begins from the coracoid process of the scapula, borders the base of the breast, and ends at the xiphoid process or the base of the sternum.
- Herzen's operation:

1. A two-stage surgical operation used for anterior craniocerebral hernias, the first stage of which involves ligation and transection of the intracranial portion of the hernia sac neck and plastic repair of the inner opening of the bony canal of the hernia using a free periosteal–osseous flap obtained by cutting from the frontal eminence (without performing plastic repair of the dural defect), while the second stage consists of complete excision of the outer part of the hernia;
2. A surgical operation used for femoral hernia, in which closure of the hernial orifice is achieved by attaching the inguinal ligament to the pubic bone with wire sutures passed through holes drilled in the bone.
3. A surgical operation for a mobile caecum: the abdominal cavity is opened by an oblique incision in the right iliac region, the vermiform appendix is removed; the excess portion of the peritoneum on the mesentery of the caecum and in the region of the iliac fossa lateral to the intestine is resected, after which the edge of the incision of the parietal peritoneum is sutured in an oblique direction with interrupted sutures to the tenia libera; upon tightening of the sutures, fixation and narrowing of the intestine occurs.

- Herzen–Monprofit operation — a palliative surgical operation used for cancer of the head of the pancreas, consisting of creating an anastomosis between the gallbladder and the distal end of a loop of the jejunum excluded by a U-shaped Roux anastomosis.
- Herzen–Lichtenberg operation — a surgical operation used for hydronephrosis, consisting of the creation of a longitudinal pelvi-ureteral anastomosis.
- Zerenin–Kümmell–Herzen operation — a surgical operation used for rectal prolapse, consisting of transabdominal fixation of the pelvic portion of the sigmoid colon to the anterior longitudinal ligament of the spine in the region of the sacral promontory.
- Keetley–Torek–Herzen operation — a surgical operation used for cryptorchidism, consisting of mobilisation and lowering of the testis to the bottom of the scrotum with its fixation to the fascia of the thigh by the tunica albuginea for 2–4 months.
- Marie–Herzen operation — a surgical operation used for portal hypertension and ascites, consisting of wrapping the kidney with a pedicled omentum.
- Roux–Herzen operation — a surgical operation consisting of the creation of an artificial oesophagus from the small intestine, passed subcutaneously in front of the sternum.
- Torek–Herzen operation — a two-stage surgical operation used for cryptorchidism, in the first stage of which the testis is lowered into the scrotum and, through an incision in the region of the scrotal floor, fixed to the broad fascia of the thigh with simultaneous suturing of the edges of the scrotal incision to the edges of the incision on the thigh, while in the second stage, performed 6–12 months later, the scrotum is separated from the thigh and the testis from the fascia.
- Herzen–Bakulev method — a method of oesophagojejunostomy following gastrectomy: a portion of the stomach along the lesser curvature is left on the oesophagus; an anastomosis with a loop of the jejunum is placed on the formed "small stomach".
- Herzen–Friedrich method — a surgical operation used for rectal prolapse, consisting of suturing the sigmoid colon in a tensioned position to the anterior abdominal wall after preliminary creation of an anastomosis between both limbs of the intestine.
- Herzen's bile diversion method (Roux–Herzen method) — a method of cholecystojejunostomy: an anastomosis is created between the end of a V-shaped excluded loop of the jejunum and the gallbladder.

== Principal scientific works ==
- Herzen, Pierre (1897). Les causes de mort après la double vagotomie dans leur rapport avec les conditions de survie. Travail du Laboratorie de physiologie de l'Université de Lausanne (in French). Lausanne: Impr. L. Vincent.
- Herzen P. A. (1901). Частичная ринопластика: Восстановление кончика носа [Partial Rhinoplasty: Reconstruction of the Nose Tip] (in Russian). Moscow: T-vo skoropech. A. A. Levenson.
- Herzen P. A. (1903). "К вопросу о технике холецистэнтеростомии" [On the Question of the Technique of Cholecystoenterostomy]. Russkoye khirurgicheskoye obozreniye (in Russian). 1 (1). Moscow: 32.
- Herzen P. A. (1903). О полной промежностной простатектомии [On Complete Perineal Prostatectomy] (in Russian). Moscow: T-vo tip. A. I. Mamontova.
- Herzen P. A. (1904). "Два случая операции на сердце. IV съезд Российских хирургов, 1903" [Two Cases of Heart Surgery. 4th Congress of Russian Surgeons, 1903]. Russky khirurgichesky arkhiv (in Russian). 1. Saint Petersburg: 144–145.
- Herzen P. A. (1904). К казуистике ранений сердца: (Доложено на Пирогов. съезде 1904 г.) [On Case Reports of Cardiac Wounds: (Presented at the Pirogov Congress of 1904)] (in Russian). Moscow: T-vo tip. A. I. Mamontova.
- Herzen P. A. (1904). "К казуистике ранений сердца" [On Case Reports of Cardiac Wounds]. Meditsinskoye obozreniye (in Russian). 61 (7). Moscow: 465–472.
- Herzen P. A. (1907). О ремиттирующем гидронефрозе и о лоханочно-мочеточниковой пластике [On Remitting Hydronephrosis and on Pelvi-ureteral Plasty] (in Russian). Moscow: (Unknown).
- Herzen P. A. (1907). О технике чрезпузырной простатектомии [On the Technique of Transvesical Prostatectomy] (in Russian). Moscow: T-vo skoropech. A. A. Levenson.
- Herzen P. A. (1907). "О технике чрезпузырной простатектомии" [On the Technique of Transvesical Prostatectomy]. Труды VI съезда российских хирургов [Proceedings of the 6th Congress of Russian Surgeons] (in Russian). Moscow: (Unknown). pp. 221–223.
- Herzen P. A. (1908). "Случай доброкачественного сужения пищевода, оперированного по видоизменённому способу Ру" [A Case of Benign Oesophageal Stricture Operated on by the Modified Roux Method]. Труды VII съезда российских хирургов [Proceedings of the 7th Congress of Russian Surgeons] (in Russian). Moscow: (Unknown). pp. 210–213, 220–221.
- Herzen P. A. (1909). О нефролизине [On Nephrolysin]. Moscow: T-vo "Pechatnya S. P. Yakovleva".
- Herzen P. A. (1909). Экспериментальное исследование о действии на почки веществ, возникающих в крови при иммунизации животных почечною тканью или при повреждении одной почки: Дис. на степ. д-ра мед [Experimental Study of the Effect on the Kidneys of Substances Arising in the Blood upon Immunisation of Animals with Renal Tissue or upon Injury to One Kidney: Doctoral Dissertation in Medicine] (in Russian). Moscow: T-vo "Pechatnya S. P. Yakovleva".
- Herzen P. A. (1911). О некоторых новых способах обеззараживания рук и операционного поля [On Some New Methods of Disinfecting the Hands and the Operative Field]. Moscow: (Unknown).
- Herzen P. A. (1911). Хирургическое лечение травматических аневризм: По наблюдениям Русско-японской войны и последующих лет [Surgical Treatment of Traumatic Aneurysms: Based on Observations from the Russo-Japanese War and Subsequent Years] (in Russian). Moscow: (Unknown).
- Herzen P. A. (1924). "О перикардиотомии" [On Pericardiotomy]. Klinicheskaya meditsina (in Russian). 2 (1). Moscow: 5–8.
- Herzen P. A. (1928). "О раке языка" [On Cancer of the Tongue]. Novy Khirurgichesky Arkhiv (in Russian). 16 (3). Dnepropetrovsk.
- Herzen P. A. (1930). "Введение в клинику хирургических форм рака" [Introduction to the Clinical Study of Surgical Forms of Cancer]. Novaya khirurgiya (in Russian). 11 (7).
- Herzen P. A. (1933). "Случай антеторакальной пластики пищевода путём перемещения желудка" [A Case of Antithoracic Oesophageal Plasty by Gastric Transposition]. Novy Khirurgichesky Arkhiv (in Russian). 38 (110). Dnepropetrovsk: 264–265.
- Herzen P. A. (1934). "О границах оперативного лечения раковых опухолей в связи с их патологическими свойствами" [On the Limits of Surgical Treatment of Cancerous Tumours in Relation to Their Pathological Properties]. Voprosy onkologii [Issues of Oncology]. Vol. 5. pp. 126–147.
- Herzen P. A. (1940). О кровотечениях [On Haemorrhages] (in Russian). Moscow: Medgiz.
- Herzen P. A. (1936). "О хирургии сердечных заболеваний" [On the Surgery of Cardiac Diseases]. Sovetskaya khirurgiya (in Russian) (3). Moscow: Medgiz: 379–393.
- Herzen P. A. (1956). Yanishevsky F. I. (ed.). Избранные труды [Selected Works] (in Russian). Moscow: Medgiz.
- Herzen P. A. (1960). Причины смерти после двусторонней ваготомии в их связи с условиями выживания [The Causes of Death after Bilateral Vagotomy in Their Relation to Conditions of Survival] (in Russian). Translated from French by R. M. Gurvich. Moscow: Medgiz.

== Family ==
Wife: Elena Mikhailovna Zoti, daughter of an honorary citizen. Their children:

- Elena (1899–?)
- Alexander (1900–?)
- Konstantin (1902–?)
- Vladimir (1907–?)

== Bibliography ==
- Afyani, V. Yu., ed. (2008). "Herzen, Pyotr Aleksandrovich". Архив Российской академии наук: Путеводитель по фондам (Москва): фонды личного происхождения [Archive of the Russian Academy of Sciences: Guide to the Fondy (Moscow): Fonds of Personal Origin] (in Russian). Moscow: Nauka. pp. 112–113. ISBN 978-5-02-010366-5.
- Semashko, Nikolai Aleksandrovich, ed. (1929). "Herzen, Pyotr Aleksandrovich". Герцен Пётр Александрович // Большая медицинская энциклопедия: В 35 томах [Peter Aleksandrovich Herzen // The Great Medical Encyclopedia: in 35 volumes] (in Russian). Vol. 6. Vyvikhi — Gimza (1st ed.). Moscow: Soviet Encyclopedia. pp. 697–698.
- Prokhorov, A. M., ed. (1998). "Herzen, Pyotr Aleksandrovich". Герцен Пётр Александрович // Большой энциклопедический словарь [Peter Alexandrovich Herzen // Great Encyclopedic Dictionary]. Great Encyclopedic Dictionary (in Russian) (2nd, revised and enlarged ed.). Moscow: Great Russian Encyclopedia. pp. 271. ISBN 5-85270-305-2.
- "Herzen, Pyotr Aleksandrovich". Герцен Пётр Александрович // Москва. Энциклопедический справочник [Peter Alexandrovich Herzen // Moscow: Encyclopedic Reference Guide]. Moscow. Encyclopedic Reference Book (in Russian). Moscow: Great Russian Encyclopedia. 1992.
- Andreev, A. A.; Ostroushko, A. P. (2021). "Петр Александрович Герцен — основоположник онкологии в СССР, заслуженный деятель науки РСФСР. К 150-летию со дня рождения" [Pyotr Aleksandrovich Herzen — founder of oncology in the USSR, Honored Scientist of the RSFSR. On the 150th anniversary of his birth]. Vestnik eksperimental'noi i klinicheskoi khirurgii (in Russian). 14 (3): 248–249. doi:10.18499/2070-478X-2021-14-3-248-249.
- Zabludovsky, A. M. (1947). "Памяти Петра Александровича Герцена" [In memory of Pyotr Aleksandrovich Herzen]. Khirurgiia. Zhurnal im. N. I. Pirogova (in Russian) (9). Moscow: 3. ISSN 0023-1207.
- Knopov, M. Sh. (1998). "П. А. Герцен и его школа" [P. A. Herzen and his school]. Annaly khirurgii (in Russian) (6). Moscow: Meditsina: 14–16. ISSN 1560-9502.
- Knopov, M. Sh.; Taranukha, V. K. (2011). "Петр Александрович Герцен. К 140-летию со дня рождения" [Peter Aleksandrovich Herzen. On the 140th anniversary of his birth] (PDF). Khirurgiia. Zhurnal im. N. I. Pirogova (in Russian) (5). Moscow: Media Sfera: 78–80. ISSN 0023-1207. Archived from the original (PDF) on August 26, 2014.
- Kovanov, V. V. (1972). П. А. Герцен: к 100-летию со дня рождения (1871—1971) [P. A. Herzen: on the 100th anniversary of his birth (1871–1971)]. Outstanding figures of Russian medicine and healthcare. Moscow: Meditsina. p. 55.
- Andreev, A. Yu., ed. (2010). "Herzen, Pyotr Aleksandrovich". Императорский Московский университет: 1755—1917 (in Russian). Moscow: Rossiiskaia politicheskaia entsiklopediia (ROSSPEN). p. 156. ISBN 978-5-8243-1429-8.
- Kuzmin, M. K. (1971). "Научный подвиг Петра Александровича Герцена" [The scientific feat of Petr Aleksandrovich Herzen]. Sovetskaia meditsina (in Russian) (8). Moscow: Meditsina: 141. ISSN 0038-5077.
- Kuzmin, M. K. (1951). "П. А. Герцен — хирург-новатор и патриот" [P. A. Herzen — innovative surgeon and patriot]. Sovetskaia meditsina (in Russian) (8). Moscow: 36. ISSN 0038-5077.
- Melikhov, P. T. (1939). "40-летний юбилей врачебной, научно-исследовательской и общественной деятельности заслуженного деятеля науки проф. П. А. Герцена" [40th anniversary of the medical, scientific-research and public activities of the Honored Scientist Prof. P. A. Herzen]. Khirurgiia. Zhurnal im. N. I. Pirogova (in Russian) (4). Moscow: 122–124. ISSN 0023-1207.
- Bakulev, Aleksandr Nikolaevich, ed. (1958). "Herzen, Pyotr Aleksandrovich". Большая медицинская энциклопедия [Great Medical Encyclopedia] (in Russian). Vol. 6. Vul'va — Ginantrop (2nd ed.). Moscow: Gosudarstvennoe izdatel'stvo meditsinskoi literatury. p. 972.
- Petrovskii, Boris Vasil'evich, ed. (1977). "Herzen, Pyotr Aleksandrovich". Большая медицинская энциклопедия: В 30 томах [Great Medical Encyclopedia: In 30 volumes] (in Russian). Vol. 5. Gambuzia — Gipotiazid (3rd ed.). Moscow: Soviet Encyclopedia. pp. 331–332.
- Petrovsky, B. V. (1971). "Петр Александрович Герцен (К 100-летию со дня рождения)" [Peter Aleksandrovich Herzen (On the 100th anniversary of his birth)]. Khirurgiia. Zhurnal im. N. I. Pirogova (in Russian) (5). Moscow: 3. ISSN 0023-1207.
- Petrovsky, B. V. (1957). "Творческий путь П. А. Герцена" [The creative path of P. A. Herzen]. Khirurgiia. Zhurnal im. N. I. Pirogova (in Russian) (5). Moscow: 3. ISSN 0023-1207.
- Telichkin, I. A. (1997). "Памяти Петра Александровича Герцена (К 125-летию со дня рождения и 50-летию со дня смерти)" [In memory of Pyotr Aleksandrovich Herzen (On the 125th anniversary of his birth and 50th anniversary of his death)]. Khirurgiia. Zhurnal im. N. I. Pirogova (in Russian) (7). Moscow: Media Sfera: 71–72. ISSN 0023-1207.
