= Yevgeniy Chazov =

Russian physician (1929–2021)

- Евгений Чазов
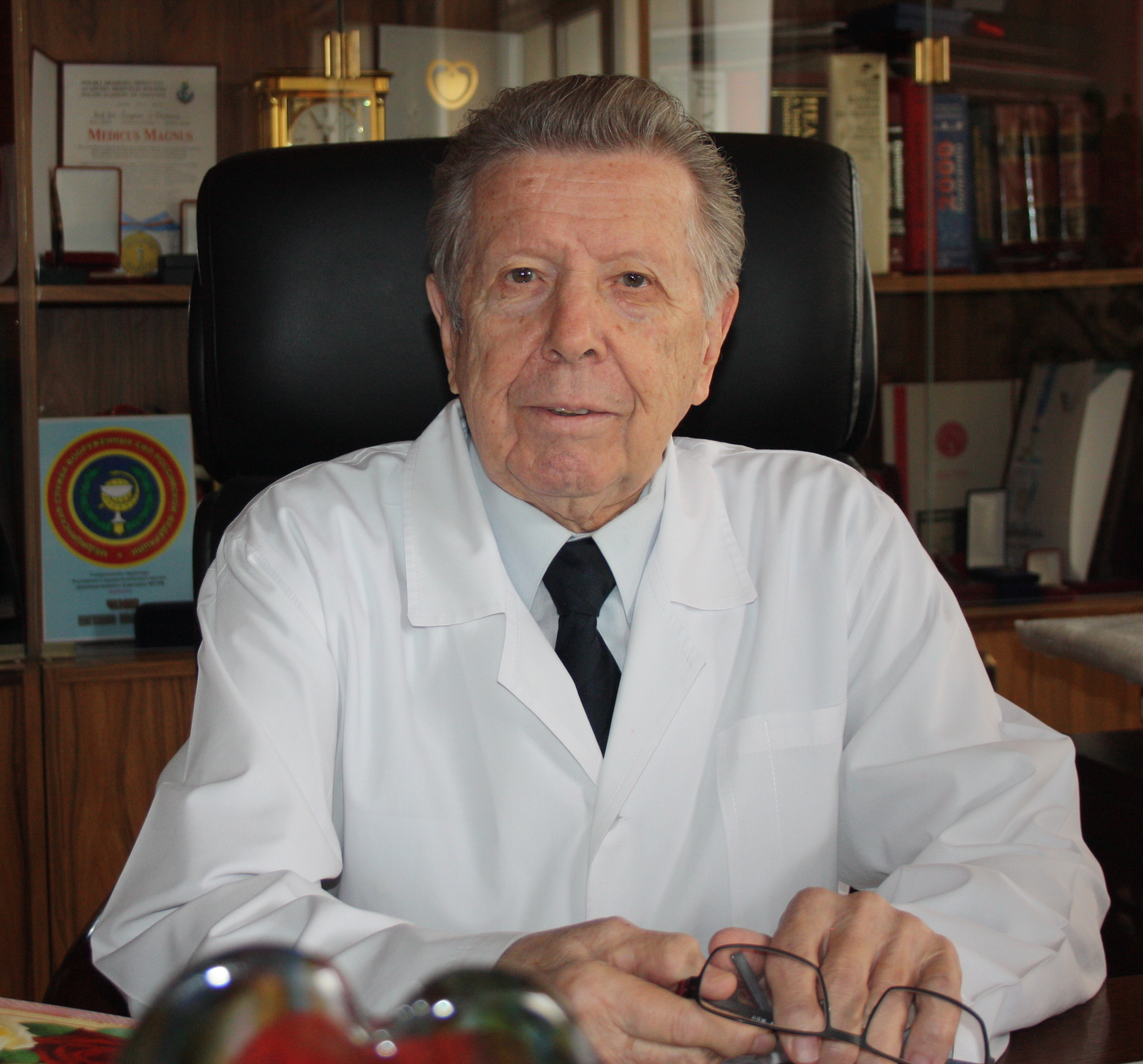
- Chazov in 2014

Minister of Health of the Soviet Union
- In office 17 February 1987 – 29 March 1990
- Premier: Nikolai Ryzhkov
- Preceded by: Sergei Burenkov
- Succeeded by: Igor Denisov

Personal details
- Born: 10 June 1929 Nizhny Novgorod, Russian SFSR, Soviet Union
- Died: 12 November 2021 (aged 92) Moscow, Russia
- Party: Communist Party of the Soviet Union
- Education: Kiev Medical Institute
- Awards: Order of Lenin (1969, 1976, 1978, 1981); USSR State Prize (1975); Hero of Socialist Labour (1978); Lenin Prize (1982); Order "For Merit to the Fatherland" (2004, 2009, 2014, 2019)

Yevgeniy Ivanovich Chazov (Russian: Евгений Иванович Чазов; 10 June 1929 – 12 November 2021) was a physician of the Soviet Union and Russia, specializing in cardiology, Chief of the Fourth Directorate of the ministry of health, academic of the Russian Academy of Sciences and the Russian Academy of Medical Sciences, a recipient of numerous awards and decorations, Soviet, Russian, and foreign.

== Biography ==
Chazov was born in 1929. He was a graduate of the Kiev Medical Institute. Following his graduation he worked as a clinic surgeon, and later joined the research institute of therapy of the USSR Academy of Medical Sciences. He served as a managing director of the A. L. Myasnikov Research Institute. Chazov was the director of the Moscow cardiological center since 1976. It is one of the largest such centers in the world, comprising 10 separate institutes. As the chief of the fourth directorate of the Ministry of Health, which took care of Soviet leaders, he was widely regarded to be a person responsible for the health of the Soviet leadership, although he sometimes denied that he was their "personal physician". He was the deputy health minister and appointed minister of health in 1987. Chazov was a member of the central committee of the Communist Party.

In his book of memoirs, Health and Power he described many circumstances concerning the health of the Soviet leaders and of some leaders of the Soviet satellites.

== Research ==
Chazov was one of pioneers of thrombolytic therapy of myocardial infarction.

== Nobel Peace Prize ==
Yevgeniy Chazov was a co-founder and co-president of International Physicians for the Prevention of Nuclear War. Charged with promoting research on the probable medical, psychological, and biospheric effects of nuclear war, the group was awarded the Nobel Peace Prize on 10 December 1985. On the occasion of the award, Chazov gave the acceptance speech in Oslo. At that time the group represented more than 135,000 members from 41 countries. Many groups protested about the decision to include Chazov, and alleged that Chazov was responsible for some of the Soviet abuses of psychiatry and medicine and for attacks against a 1975 recipient of the Nobel Peace Prize, the physicist and Soviet dissident Andrei D. Sakharov.

== Personal life ==
Chazov was married three times. He had two daughters, Tatyana and Irina (cardiologist, member of the Russian Academy of Sciences), from the first and second marriage, respectively.

== Legacy ==
On 16 December 2022, a monument to the founder of "Kremlin medicine" - cardiologist Evgeny Chazov was erected on the territory of the Moscow Central Clinical Hospital of the Presidential Administration of the Russian Federation.

== Gallery ==
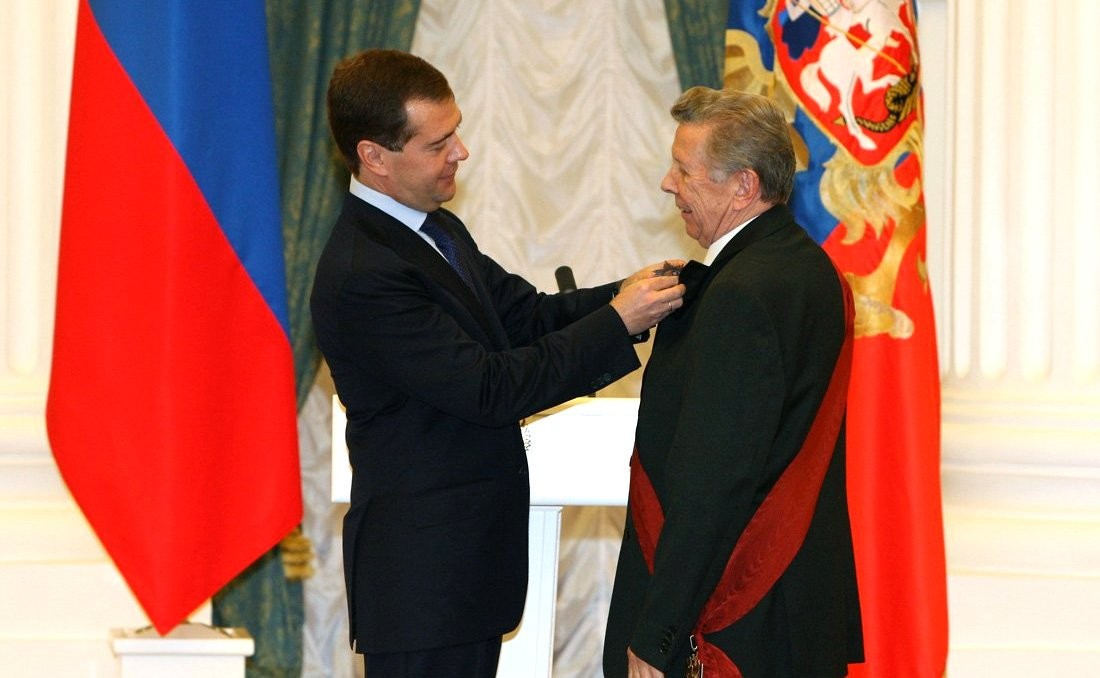
Presentation of the Order "For Merit to the Fatherland", 1st class (November 2, 2009)

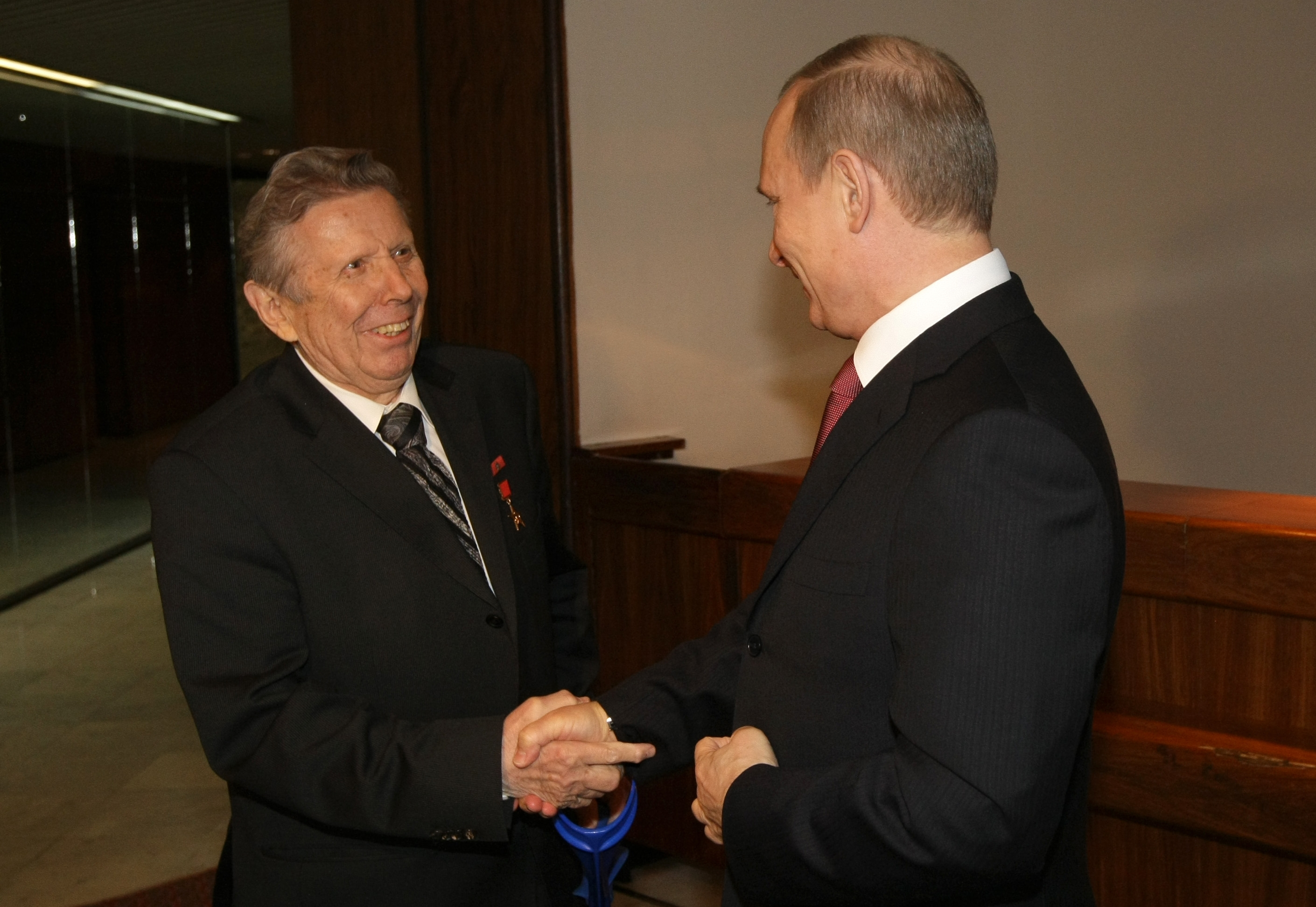
With Vladimir Putin (April 16, 2011)

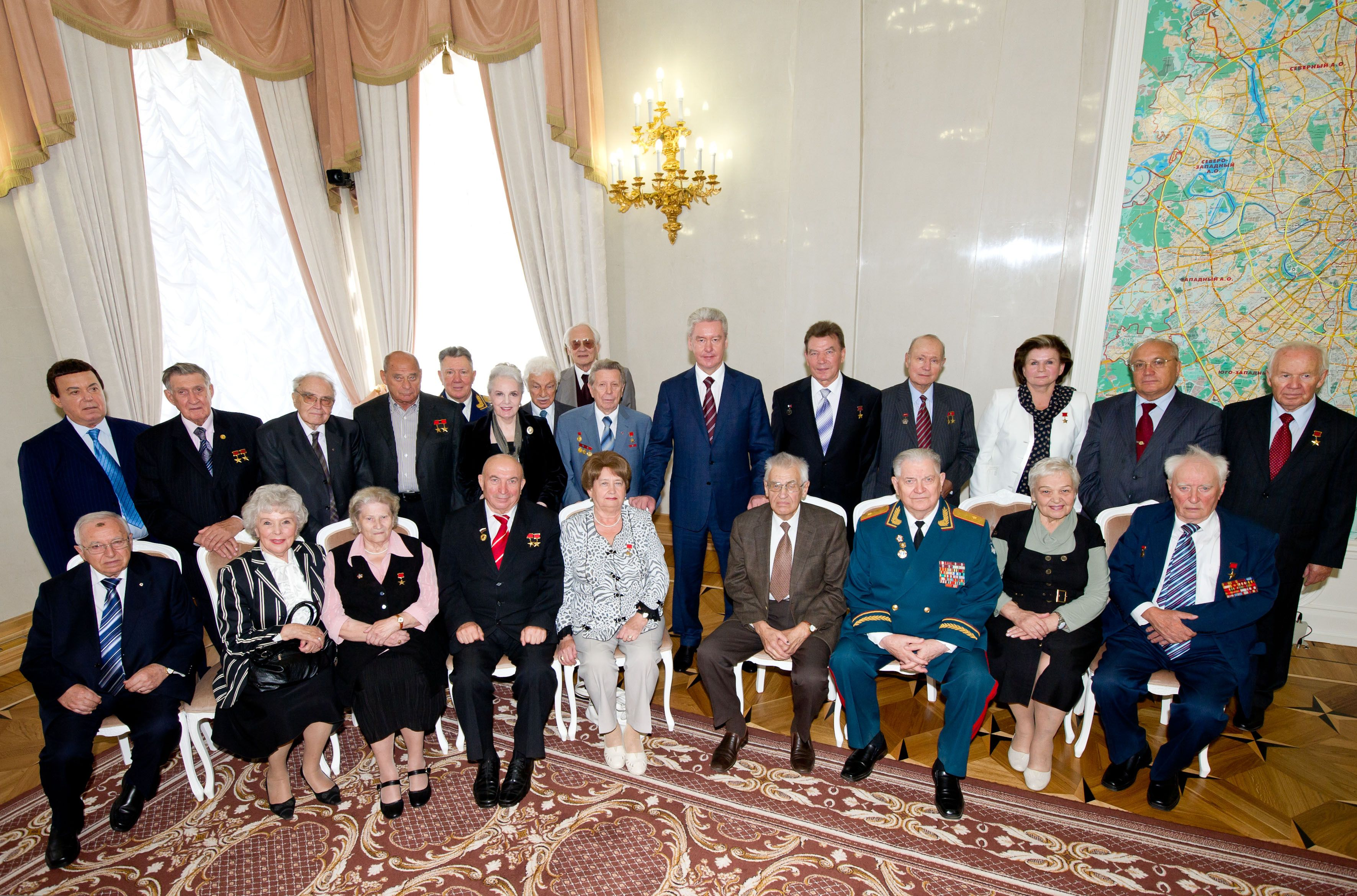
With Sergey Sobyanin and other honor people (September 2, 2011)

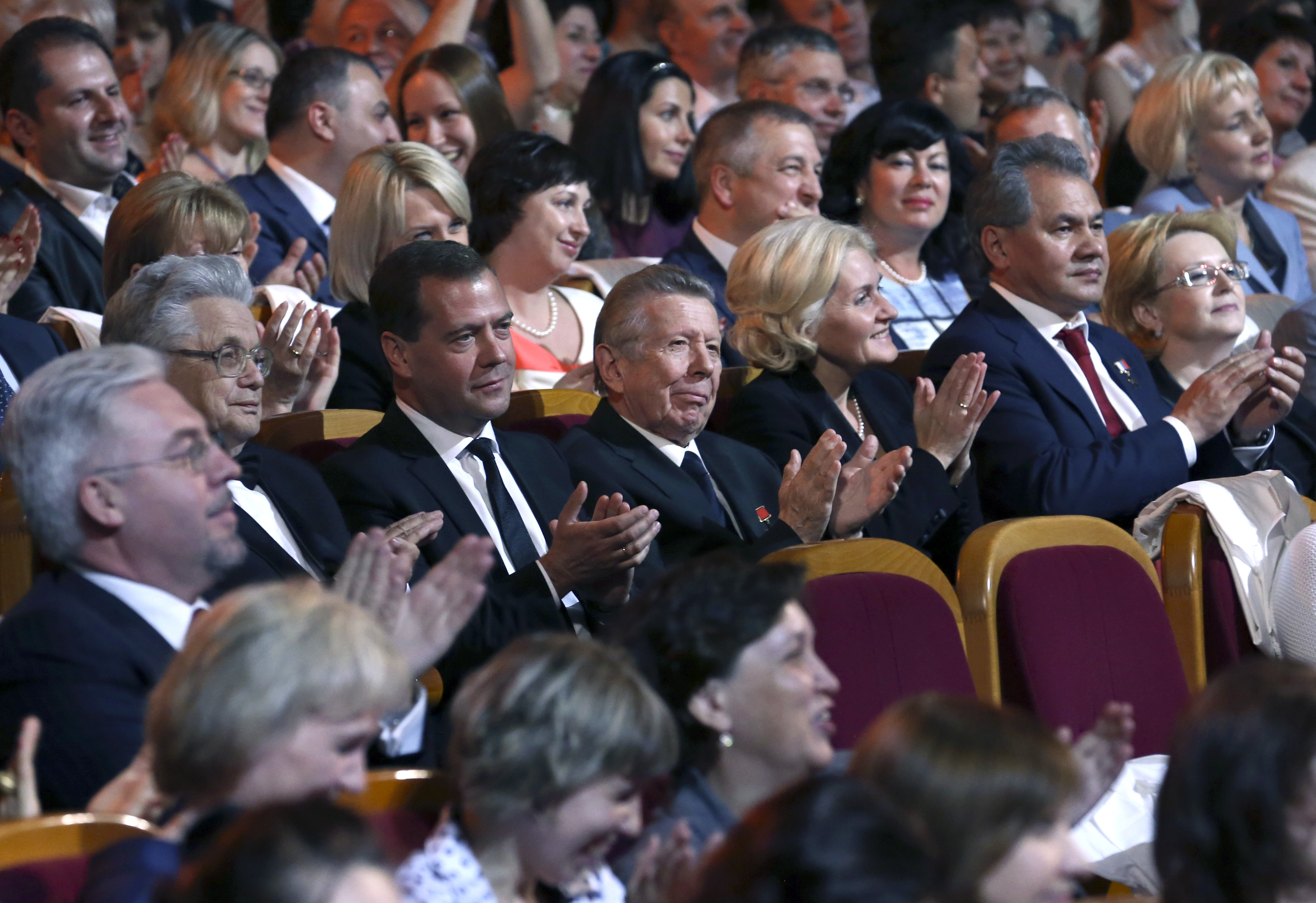
On Prizvanie Prize (June 13, 2013)

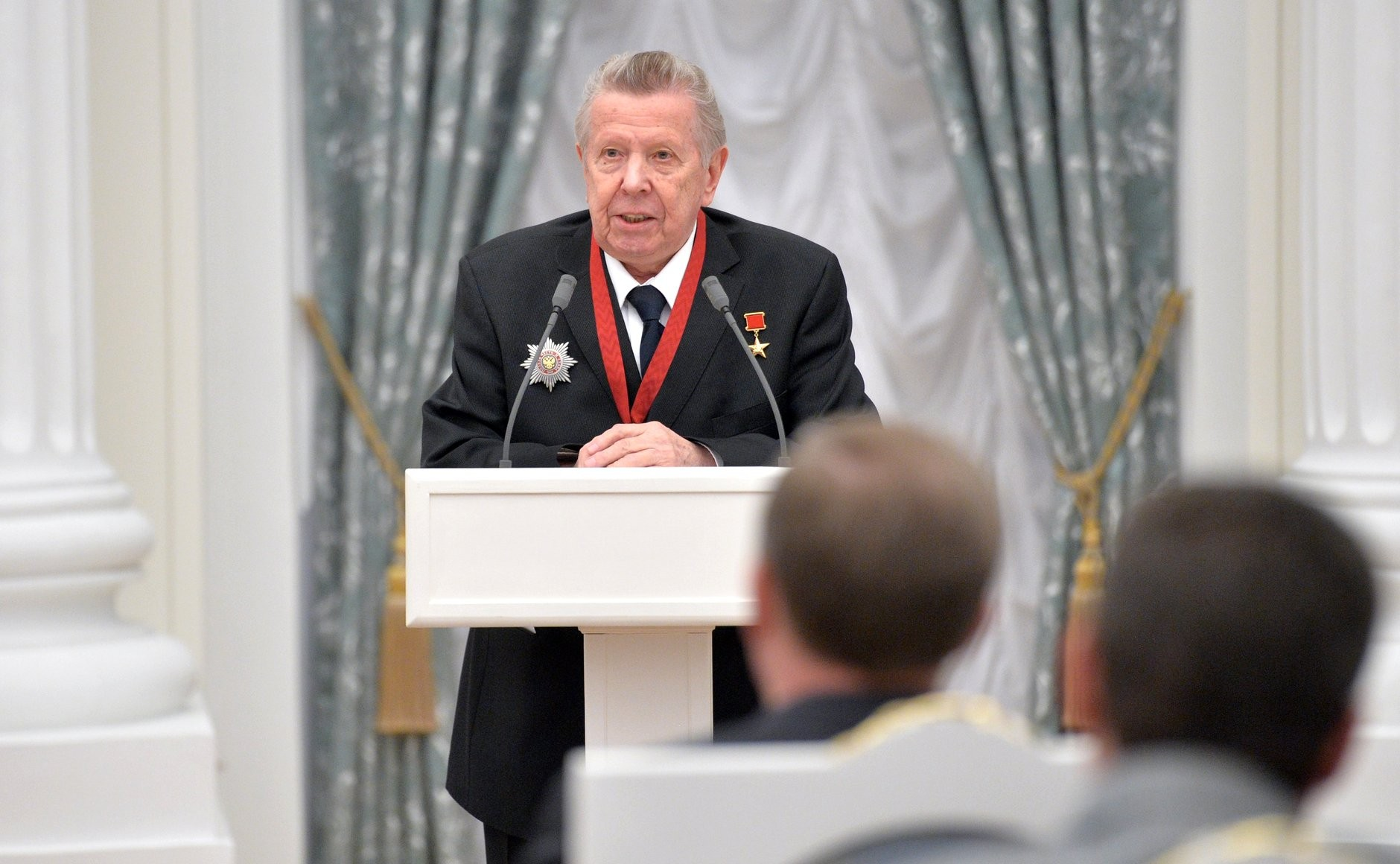
Presentation of the Order "For Merit to the Fatherland", 3rd class (May 21, 2015)
