= César Roux =

Swiss surgeon (1857–1934)

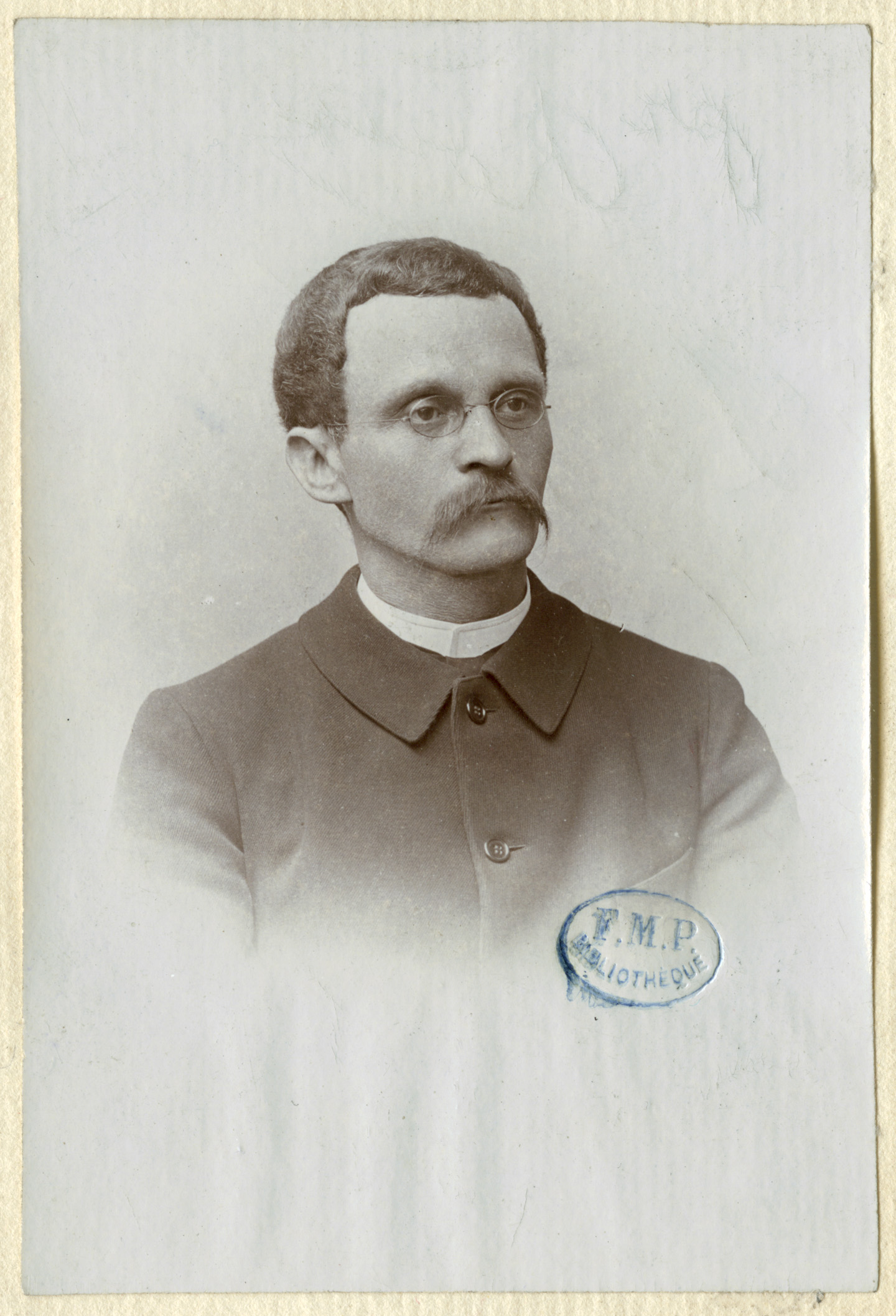
César Roux

César Roux (23 March 1857, in Mont-la-Ville – 21 December 1934, in Lausanne) was a Swiss surgeon, who described the Roux-en-Y procedure.

He studied medicine at the University of Bern, where his influences included Christoph Theodor Aeby and Theodor Langhans. Following graduation in 1880, he remained in Bern as an assistant to Theodor Kocher. In 1887 he became chief of both surgical departments at the cantonal hospital in Lausanne.

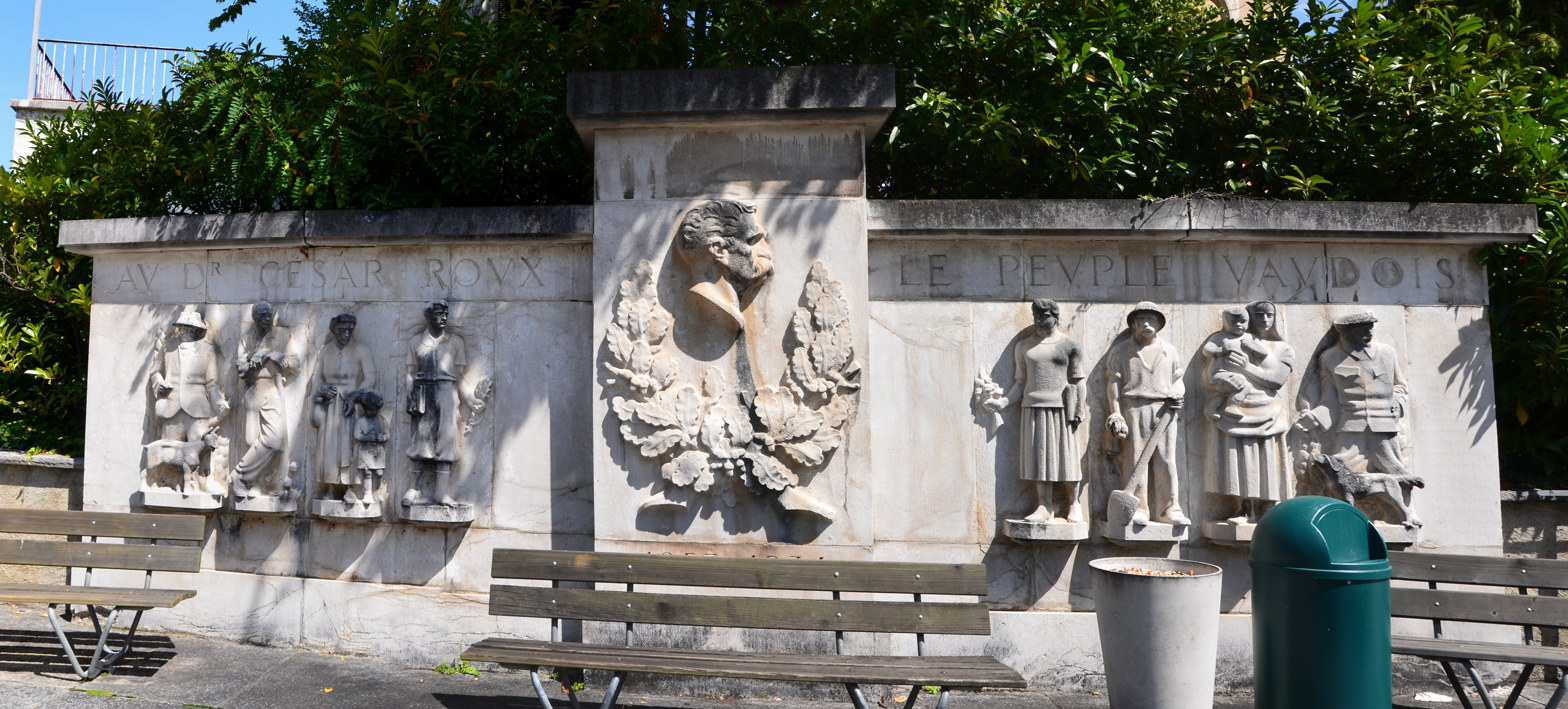
Bas-relief of César Roux at the cantonal hospital in Lausanne

In 1885 he was named an associate professor of forensic medicine at the Academy of Lausanne, and when the academy achieved university status in 1890, he was appointed director of the surgical clinic at the faculty of medicine.

In 1926, Roux performed the first successful surgical removal of a pheochromocytoma.

== See also ==
- Peter Herzen
