= Christoph Theodor Aeby =

Swiss anatomist and anthropologist

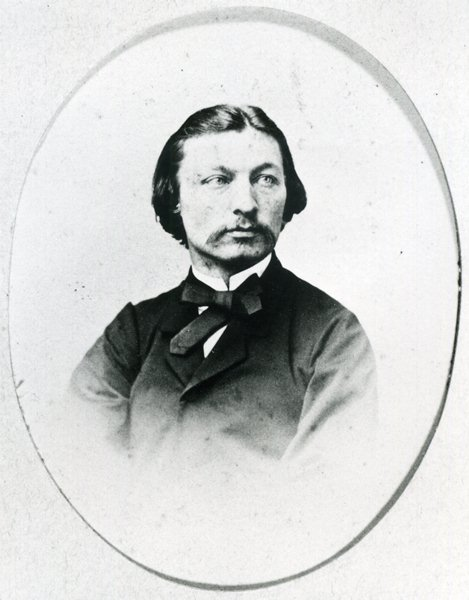
- Christoph Theodor Aeby (ca. 1880)
- Born: February 25, 1835
- Died: July 7, 1885 (aged 50); Berlin
- Occupations: Anatomist, anthropologist, academic
- Known for: Aeby's plane

Academic work
- Notable students: Stefania Berlinerblau, César Roux
- Main interests: Comparative anatomy
- Notable works: Der Bronchialbaum der Säugethiere und des Menschen; Beiträge zur Kenntniss der Mikrocephalie

Christoph Theodor Aeby (25 February 1835 – 7 July 1885) was a Swiss anatomist, anthropologist, and academic. His main scientific interest was comparative anatomy and his studies were said to be facilitated by a large collection of bones, which he assembled in Bern. He is particularly noted for his work on the bronchial tree, which was published as a monograph in 1880. Through his work, a term in anthropology was named after him - the "Aeby's plane", which pertains to the plane through the nasion and brasion.

== Biography ==
Aeby was born in Phalsbourg, Lorraine, France. He was the son of a farmer who owned a large tract of land in Alsace. He studied medicine at Basel and Göttingen. In 1863 he was named a professor of anatomy at the University of Bern (1866/67, academic rector), and in 1884 at the University of Prague as successor to Carl Toldt. Some of his noted students include the surgeons Stefania Berlinerblau and César Roux.

He died in Bilin, Bohemia at the age of 50.

== Works ==
He is best known for his contributions to anthropology, which include a new and valuable craniometric method. He performed research of microcephaly, publishing Beiträge zur Kenntniss der Mikrocephalie (1874) as a result. He also demonstrated the influence of atmospheric pressure on the several joints of the human body, and conducted significant studies involving the upper respiratory tract. In 1878, Aeby is also credited for describing the muscle rectus labi proprius.

A mountain climber, he was co-author of Das Hochgebirge von Grindelwald (The high mountains of Grindelwald, 1865).

== Associated eponyms ==
- "Aeby's muscle": The depressor labii inferioris muscle.
- "Aeby's plane": A craniometric plane. It passes through the nasion and basion perpendicular to the median plane of the cranium.

== Selected works ==
- Eine neue Methode zur bestimmung der Schädelform von Menschen und Säugethieren, 1862 – A new method for determining the shape of the skull in humans and mammals
- Die Schädelformen des Menschen und der Affen : eine morphologische Studie, 1867 – The skull shapes of humans and monkeys: a morphological study.
- Beiträge zur Kenntniss der Mikrocephalie, 1874 – Contribution to the knowledge of microcephaly.
- Schema des Faserverlaufes im menschlichen Gehirn und Rückenmark, 1884 – Schema involving the fiber path in the human brain and spinal cord.
- Der Bronchialbaum der Säugethiere und des Menschen : nebst Bemerkungen über den Bronchialbaum der Vögel und Reptilien, 1880 – The bronchial tract of mammals and humans.
