= Grigory Kaminsky =

Soviet politician (1895–1938)

- Григорий Каминский
- Kaminsky in the 1930s

People's Commissar for Health of the USSR
- In office 15 February 1934 – 26 June 1937
- Premier: Vyacheslav Molotov
- Preceded by: Mikhail Vladimirsky
- Succeeded by: Mikhail Boldyrev

First Secretary of the Central Committee of the Azerbaijan Communist Party
- In office 24 October 1920 – 24 July 1921
- Preceded by: Mirza Davud Huseynov
- Succeeded by: Sergey Kirov

Personal details
- Born: 1 November 1895 Ekaterinoslav, Russian Empire
- Died: 10 February 1938 (aged 42) Moscow, Russian SFSR, Soviet Union
- Party: RSDLP (Bolsheviks) (1913–1918); Russian Communist Party (1918–1937)

Grigory Naumovich Kaminsky (Azerbaijani: Ҝригориј Камински Наум оғлу, romanized: Griqoriy Kaminski Naum oğlu, Russian: Григорий Наумович Каминский; 1 November 1895 – 10 February 1938) was a Soviet politician who was the 2nd First Secretary of Azerbaijan Communist Party, and one of the founders of the health care system in the Soviet Union.

== Early life ==
Kaminsky was born in the family of a Jewish blacksmith in Ekaterinoslav, Ukraine. He became involved in the revolutionary movement as a 16 year old pupil in a Gymnasium in Minsk, in Belarus, distributing Pravda to factory workers. He joined the Bolsheviks in 1913. In 1915, he entered the Lomonosov Moscow State University, to study medicine.

== Political career ==
In 1917, while still a student, Kaminsky became a member of Moscow bureau of Russian Social Democratic Labour Party, and had to break off his studies in March when the party sent him to Tula, where Bolsheviks and Mensheviks were united in a single party organisation, but which split after Vladimir Lenin's return to Russia. In May, Kaminsky was elected secretary of the Tula Bolsheviks. In July 1918, he launched Kommunar, Tula's first legally published Bolshevik newspaper. During the Russian Civil War, he was also chairman of the Military Revolutionary Committee, and a political commissar with the 2nd army. He was recalled in September 1920, to acting as head of the People's Commissariat of Nationalities, while the People's Commissar, Joseph Stalin, was absent on the front line during the war with Poland. Late in 1920, Kaminsky was sent to Azerbaijan, soon after it had been reoccupied by the Red Army. Aged only 25, he was First Secretary of Azerbaijan Communist Party, chairman of the Baku Commune and Red Army deputies. He was recalled to Moscow in 1921, and replaced by Sergei Kirov.

=== Agricultural co-operatives ===
With the introduction of the New Economic Policy in 1921, a major concern of the communist party was that the re-introduction of free trade in the countryside would result in rich peasants – known as kulaks exploiting the poor. As a counter measure, the communist party encouraged the formation of peasant co-operatives. Kaminsky was put in charge of their development, as Deputy Chairman of the Agricultural Union, and Chairman of the Union of Agricultural and Forestry Workers (Vserabotzemles), and head of several specialised centres. In this capacity, he was a leading champion of co-operatives.

During a Politburo session in January 1925, he warned that most peasants did not yet see the value of co-operating, and called for co-operatives to be given a commercial advantage over individual producers, and for co-operative chairmen to be elected, not appointed, and objected to the ruling which banned kulaks from joining co-operatives, because "it is much more profitable to have a kulak in agricultural co-operatives under our supervision than outside it. His policy was vehemently opposed by Leon Trotsky, leader of the Left Opposition, who claimed, in July 1926, that it would lead to the co-operatives being run not by communists and poor peasants but by 'middle' peasants.

In 1928, after Stalin had decided to drive peasants onto collective farms, Kaminsky was appointed head of Kolkhozsentr, the main farm agency for the Russian republic. In this role, he was an enthusiast advocate of the rapid formation of large collective farms, equipped with tractors and other machinery, which he believed would be the route out of poverty for peasants struggling to subsist on small landholdings. In contrast to his earlier views, he argued that kulaks should be barred from joining kolkhozes, and should be repressed. During an agricultural conference in January 1930, he urged delegates not to fear going too far in the drive for collectivisation, because it was a "revolutionary cause".

=== Party official ===
Late in 1929, Kaminsky was appointed head of the Central Committee department for agitation and mass campaigns. From 1930 until his arrest, he was elected a candidate member of the Central Committee. In 1930, he was appointed the Secretary of Moscow State Committee of the Communist Party, rising to the rank of Second Secretary.

=== Commissar for Health ===
Kaminsky served as the for the Russian Federal Republic from 15 February 1934. In August, he was given the additional title of USSR Chief Sanitory Inspector. In July 1936, he was appointed the first USSR People's Commissar for Health. He is credited with extensive work in establishing production of medicine, preparation of medical personnel, fighting malaria in Soviet Union and promotion of medical science in education system.

Kaminsky tried to protect scientists working in the field of health from being harassed for political reasons. On 26 December 1936, Pravda published an article deploring the suppression of a bulletin that had been prepared ahead of the Second Congress of Neurologists and Psychiatrists. Kaminsky had ordered it to be withdrawn because of a paragraph which accused three named scientists of 'pseudoscience' linked to fascism and racism. He was rebuked for that, and for proposing that Solomon Levit, the founder of soviet genetics, should be elected to the praesidium of the congress, when he had recently been expelled from the communist party. In an unpublished speech, he maintained that Professor Levit could still contribute usefully to science from outside the party, and warned that "If you declare people to be fascists, you need to know that this threatens them with prison". (Professor Levit was arrested and shot in 1938) Kaminsky also protested against the practice of suppressing information about epidemics.

== Death ==
On 18 February 1937, Sergo Ordzhonikidze – whom Kaminsky had known since his time in Azerbaijan in 1920 – committed suicide, and Kaminsky was required to sign an official medical report falsely claiming that he had had a heart attack. This may have prompted him to take a stand against the spread of the Great Terror.

The speech that Kaminsky reputedly delivered during a plenary session of the Central Committee of June 1937 was not included in the report, and is known only from hearsay. The historian Robert Conquest was told by an unnamed source that he spoke "with particular effect and firmness, presenting a full but calm indictment of Yezhov (head of the NKVD) and his methods." He is reputed to have told Stalin: "The NKVD is still arresting honest people." To which Stalin retorted: "They are enemies of the people, and you are a bird of the same feather." Anna Larina, widow of Nikolai Bukharin was told years later that Kaminsky spoke out against her husband's arrest. He is also credited with denouncing the future NKVD chief Lavrentiy Beria, then the party boss in Transcaucasia, mentioning that Beria had worked for the counterintelligence of the Musavat party in Azerbaijan. Nikita Khrushchev corrobated this in his memoirs.

Kaminsky was arrested that same day, 25 June 1937. He told the arresting officers: "Comrades, it's provocation!". He was accused of having been recruited by Bukharin into an anti-soviet organisation in 1929, and of having created a wrecking organisation with the commissariat of health. He admitted the charges under interrogation, probably under torture, but at his trial on 8 February 1938, which lasted 15 minutes, he said that he did not feel that he was an 'enemy of the people.' He was sentenced to death and executed by firing squad the same day.

Kaminsky was posthumously 'rehabilitated' in March 1955.

Party political offices
| Preceded by Mirza Davud Husseynov | Executive Secretary of the Azerbaijan Communist Party; 1920–1921 | Succeeded by Sergey Kirov |
