= Igor Denisov (politician) =

Russian physician and politician (1941–2021)

- Игорь Денисов

Minister of Health of the Soviet Union
- In office 18 April 1990 – 18 August 1991
- Preceded by: Yevgeniy Chazov
- Succeeded by: position abolished

Rector of Ryazan State Medical University
- In office November 1983 – 13 October 1987
- Preceded by: Anatoly Nikulin
- Succeeded by: Evgeny Stroyev

Member of the Central Committee of the Communist Party of the Soviet Union
- In office 1990–1991

Personal details
- Born: 3 September 1941 Svobodny, Amur Oblast, Russian SFSR, Soviet Union
- Died: 17 November 2021 (aged 80) Moscow, Russia
- Party: CPSU

Igor Denisov (Russian: И́горь Никола́евич Дени́сов; 3 September 1941 – 17 November 2021) was a Soviet-Russian physician and politician. He served at Ryazan State Medical University from 1983 to 1987. A member of the Communist Party of the Soviet Union, he served on its Central Committee from 1990 to 1991 and was the last Minister of Health of the Soviet Union.
