= Stefania Berlinerblau =

Jewish-American anatomist and physician (1852–1921)

- Born: 1852; Kherson, Russian Empire (now Ukraine)
- Died: September 4, 1921 (aged 68–69); Boston, Massachusetts, U.S.
- Occupation: Physician

Stefania Berlinerblau or Fanny Berlin (1852 – September 4, 1921) was an American anatomist and physician. She is noted for her investigations on blood circulation, which led to the demonstration of the artery-vein connections. She is also considered a pioneer in pushing for the recognition of women in the medical field. She was one of the first Jewish women who practiced surgery in the United States and was a co-founder of the New England Women's Medical Society, seven years before the acceptance of women into the Massachusetts Medical Society.

== Early life and education ==
Berlinerblau was born in 1852 in Kherson, Kherson Governorate, Russian Empire (currently Ukraine). She was the daughter of Markus Berlinerblau. At a young age, her ambition was to become a physician. After she completed her gymnasium education, she persuaded her parents to let her study medicine in Switzerland. Together with a friend, she became part of a colony of Russian medical students who were enrolled at the University of Zurich. An account cited that during this period, Berlinerblau was a strong sympathizer of Prince Pyotr Kropotkin, Sergey Stepnyak-Kravchinskii, and other Russian revolutionaries. For her revolutionary activities, spirited personality, and nihilist view, she was identified as one of the Kosakenpferdchen or "Cossack ponies". This group's appearance and politics had been described as "frightfully revolutionary", prompting German newspapers to warn women from associating with these students. In 1873, Tsar Alexander II banned women from studying in Zurich forcing her to transfer to Berlin where she completed her medical training.

To obtain her medical degree at the Bern Institute of Anatomy, she completed her dissertation on the blood circulation in mammals under the guidance of Christoph Theodor Aeby. Her method involved the tracing of the substances' movements from arteries to veins using dyes, which ultimately led to a demonstration of the artery-vein connections. She completed her degree in 1875, the same year she published her work on blood circulation in the journal Archiv für Anatomi und Physiologie.

== Career ==
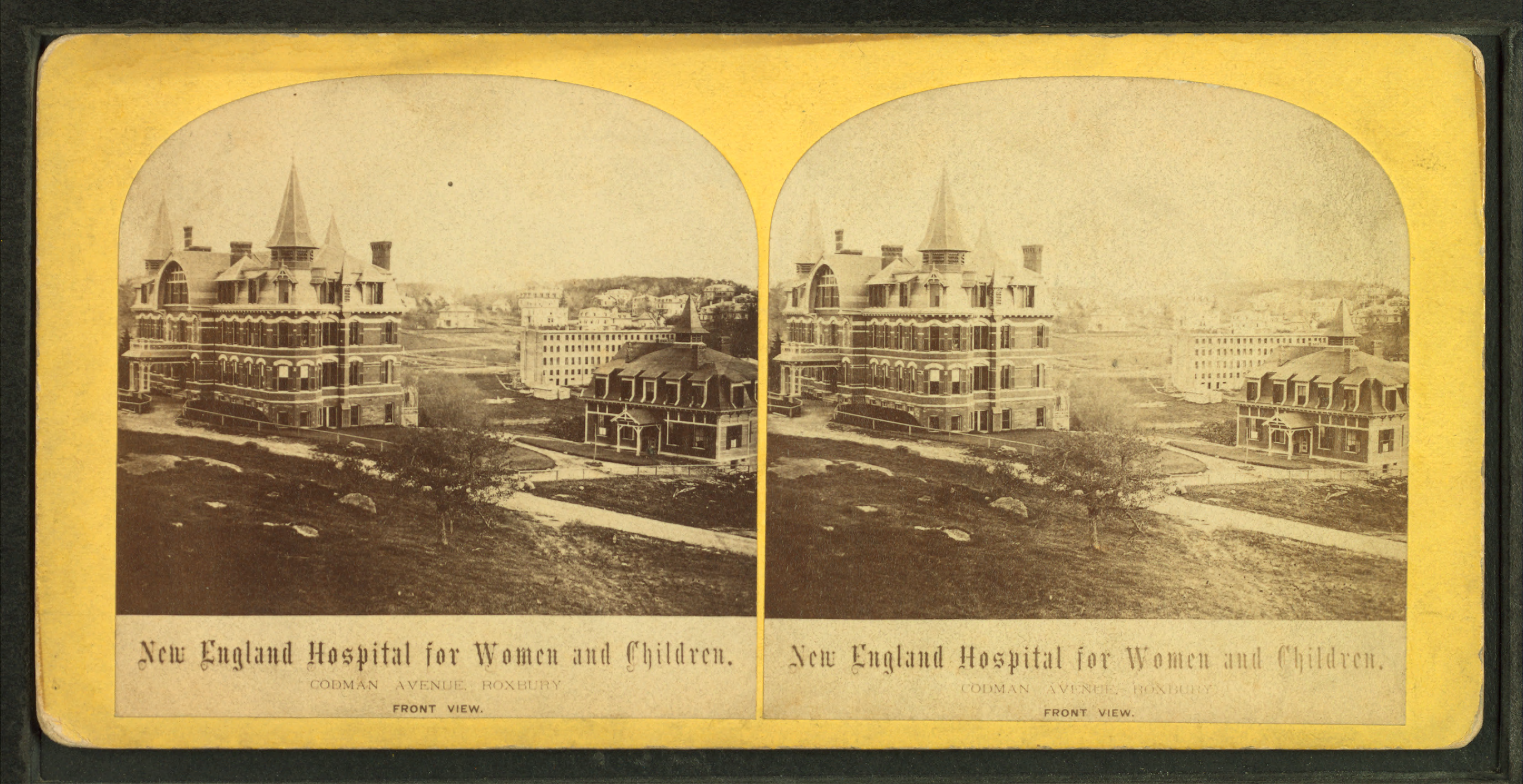
The New England Hospital for Women and Children was the only hospital in Boston that accepted female physicians during Berlinerblau's time.

By 1877, Berlinerblau had relocated to Boston for her residency at the New England Hospital for Women and Children. When she assumed her residency, she changed her name from Berlinerblau to Berlin and was published in several newspapers in the city. She was appointed to a visiting physician position in 1879. The institution was the only hospital that accepted female physicians in Boston. Berlinerblau was one of the four female surgeons in the hospital, which was administered by Dr. Marie Zakrzewska, who was also an immigrant from Berlin. This group of physicians, which included Elizabeth Keller and Mary Smith, also constituted the hospital's board of physicians, driving the institution's direction and growth for over twenty years.

By 1881, Berlinerblau had become a noted surgeon known for performing laparotomies. She also served as the New England Hospital's chief surgeon until 1894. She established a private practice after she resigned, finally retiring in 1916 due to failing eyesight.

As a woman, Berlinerblau was barred from joining the Massachusetts Medical Society. Due to this restriction, she founded the New England Women's Medical Society in 1878 together with nine other women surgeons.

Berlinerblau's published works included a paper in the American Journal of Obstetrics in which she described her surgical methods. This publication, entitled Three Cases of Complete Prolapsus Uteri Operated upon According to the Method of Léon Le Fort, detailed her successful surgical correction of uterine prolapse.

Berlinerblau died on September 4, 1921, at her home in Boston's Roxbury district.

== Publications ==
- Three Cases of Complete Prolapsus Uteri Operated upon According to the Method of Leon Le Fort (1878)
- A Case of Supposed Extra-Uterine Pregnancy Treated by Electricity (1884)
- A Case of Ante-Uterine Hematocele Laparatomy Recovery (1889)
- A Case of Tubal Pregnancy (1893)
