= Khlevnoye, Lipetsk Oblast =

Rural locality in Lipetsk Oblast, Russia

Khlevnoye Хлевное
- Selo
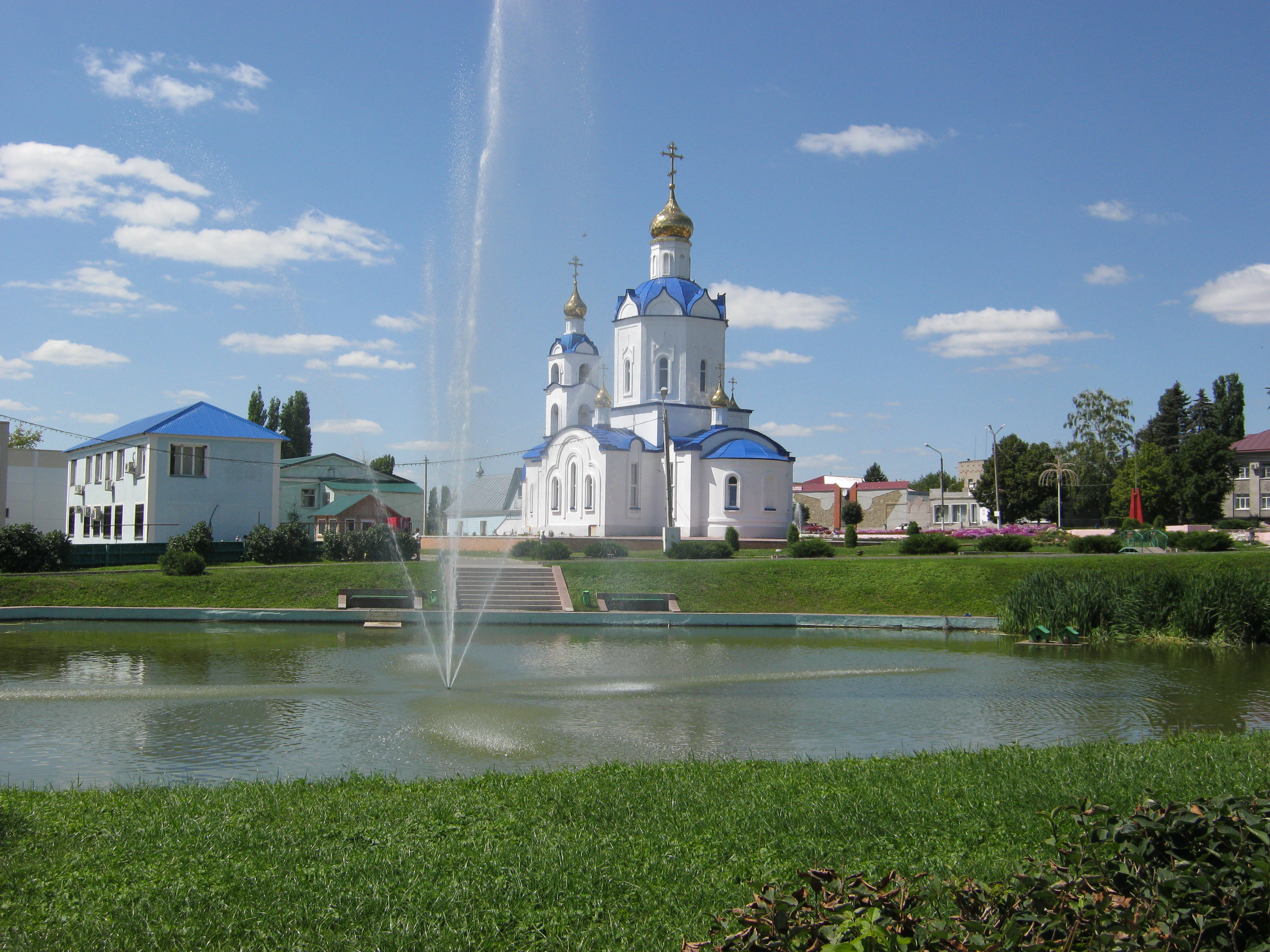
- Interactive map of Khlevnoye
- Location of Khlevnoye Khlevnoye (Lipetsk Oblast)
- Coordinates: 52°11′42″N 39°05′21″E
- Country: Russia
- Federal subject: Lipetsk Oblast
- Administrative district: Khlevensky District
- SelsovietSelsoviet: Volovsky
- Founded: 1630
- Elevation: 160 m (520 ft)

Population (2010 Census)
  - Total: 5,969
  - Estimate (2021): 6,012 (+0.7%)

Administrative status
  - Capital of: Khlevensky District, Khlevensky Selsoviet

Municipal status
  - Municipal district: Khlevensky Municipal District
  - Rural settlement: Volovsky Selsoviet Rural Settlement
  - Capital of: Khlevensky Municipal District, Khlevensky Selsoviet Rural Settlement
- Time zone: UTC+3 (MSK)
- Postal code: 399260
- OKTMO ID: 42652453101

Khlevnoye (Russian: Хлевное) is a rural locality (a selo) and the administrative center of Khlevensky District, Lipetsk Oblast, Russia. In the 19th century the village was part of Khlevenskaya volost, Zadonsky Uyezd, Voronezh Governorate. Population: 6,012 (2021 census); 5,969 (2010 census); 6,205 (2002 census); 5,898 (1989 Soviet census).
