= National Medical Research Center of Cardiology =

National Medical Research Center for Cardiology Национальный медицинский исследовательский центр кардиологии имени Чазова
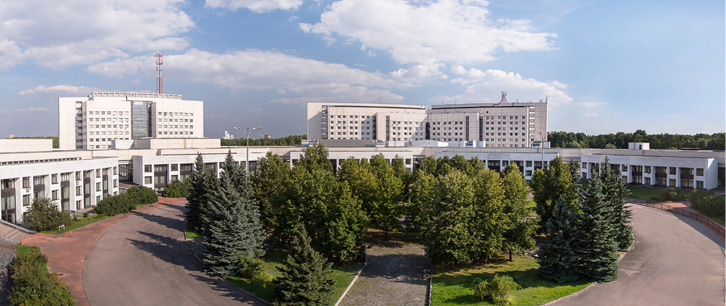

Geography
- Location: Moscow, Russia

Organisation
- Type: Specialist hospital

Services
- Emergency department: Yes

Helipads
- Helipad: yes

History
- Founded: 1945

Links
- Website: http://www.cardioweb.ru

National Medical Research Center for Cardiology named after academician Yevgeniy Chazov of the Ministry of Health of the Russian Federation (Russian: ФГБУ «Национальный медицинский исследовательский центр кардиологии имени академика Е.И. Чазова» (НМИЦ кардиологии) Министерства здравоохранения Российской Федерации) is one of the leading and oldest specialized medical institutions in Russia, whose activities are aimed at diagnosing, treating and preventing cardiovascular diseases.

== History ==
The history of the cardiological complex dates back to 1945, when the Institute of Experimental and Clinical Therapy of the USSR Academy of Medical Sciences was organized on the basis of the clinics of the All-Union Institute of Experimental Medicine. The first director of the institute was the therapist, doctor of medical sciences, academician of the Academy of Medical Sciences V. F. Zelenin.

Three years later, the Institute of Clinical Therapy was reorganized into the Institute of Therapy, and Academician A. L. Myasnikov was appointed director, who, upon taking office, identified priority areas for study: hypertension and atherosclerosis. Soon the institute became the leading institution in the Soviet Union dealing with cardiovascular pathologies. However, for further development, the institute needed to expand its staff and territory. This became possible after moving to Petroverigsky Lane. The priority areas of the Institute's activities include coronary circulation and its regulation, renal circulation and arterial hypertension; research on atherosclerosis has also expanded significantly. In 1963, the Institute established the first specialized department in the Soviet Union for the treatment of acute myocardial infarction.

In 1965, after the death of A. L. Myasnikov, Yevgeniy Chazov who worked also in the Kremlin Hospital became the director. A year later, the institute received the name of the former director and became known as the Research Institute of Therapy named after. A. L. Myasnikov, and a year later changed the name to the Institute of Cardiology. A. L. Myasnikova. At that time, the institute carried out extensive research on the possibilities of diagnosing and treating secondary forms of arterial hypertension. An experimental laboratory for cardiac electrophysiology was also founded, where two antiarrhythmic drugs, ethmozine and ethacizine, were created.

On May 16, 1973, the first clinical echocardiographic study was carried out at the institute. Yuri Belenkov, an employee of the institute, becomes a pioneer in the development and implementation of this diagnostic method into wide practice. In 1975, by a decree of the Council of Ministers of the USSR, the All-Union Cardiology Research Center (VKSC) was created, the composition of which was constantly increasing, and by 1981 it included the Research Institute of Cardiology named after. A. L. Myasnikova, Institute of Experimental Cardiology and Institute of Preventive Cardiology. On June 5 of the same year, in the Department of Emergency Cardiology of the VKSC, for the first time in the world, a patient with myocardial infarction underwent thrombolysis using intracoronary administration of fibrinolysin at a dose 10 times lower than with intravenous administration, which led to the creation of a new method of treatment - thrombolytic therapy.

On August 24, 1982 The Institute of Clinical Cardiology and the Institute of Experimental Cardiology move to a new complex of 26 buildings on 3rd Cherepkovskaya Street. The work of a group of architects (I.M. Vinogradsky, V.K. Legoshin and others) on this complex of buildings was awarded the USSR State Prize in Literature, Art and Architecture in 1990.

In 1984, the Department of Cardiac Surgery was opened, headed by Academician R.S. Akchurin. In 1988, the Institute of Preventive Cardiology was withdrawn from the VKSC, which was later transformed into the Center for Preventive Medicine. In 1996, by an order of the Government of Russia, the center received the name of the Russian Cardiology Research and Production Complex (RKNPC) of the Ministry of Health of Russia.

In 2016, plans were announced for the reconstruction and expansion of building 9b of the RKNPC, which houses the cardio-reanimation ward The reconstruction provides for a change in the space-planning decisions of the building, with placement on the first floor of a therapeutic inpatient department for 30 beds.

On May 1, 2017, in accordance with the order of the Minister of Health of the Russian Federation, Corresponding Member of the Russian Academy of Sciences, Doctor of Medical Sciences, Professor Sergey Boytsov was appointed General Director.

On July 12, 2017, the RKNPC was renamed the National Medical Research Center for Cardiology.
