= Ministry of Health (Soviet Union) =

Government ministry of the Soviet Union

Ministry of Health of the USSR
- Министерство здравоохранения СССР; Ministerstvo zdravookhraneniya SSSR
- All ministry seals of the Soviet Union used the Soviet coat of arms

Agency overview
- Formed: 16 July 1923
- Preceding agency: General Directorate of Public Health of the Russian Empire (1917)
- Dissolved: 15 November 1991
- Superseding agency: Ministry of Health of the Russian Federation (1992)
- Jurisdiction: Union of Soviet Socialist Republics
- Headquarters: Moscow, RSFSR, Soviet Union

The Ministry of Health (MOH) of the Union of Soviet Socialist Republics (USSR) (Министерство здравоохранения СССР), formed on 15 March 1946, was one of the most important government offices in the Soviet Union. It was formerly (until 1946) known as the People's Commissariat for Health (Народный комиссариат здравоохранения). The Ministry, at the all-Union level, was established on 6 July 1923, after the signing of the Treaty on the Creation of the USSR, and was, in turn, based upon the People's Commissariat for Health of the RSFSR formed in 1917. The Ministry was led by the Minister of Health, prior to 1946 a People's Commissar, who was nominated by the Chairman of the Council of Ministers and confirmed by the Presidium of the Supreme Soviet, and was a member of the Council of Ministers.

== Duties and responsibilities ==
The main duties of the ministry were to develop and to prepare these for legislation and to maintain a decent level of health organisation in the USSR. The ministry missariat monitored and supervised the application of standards and measures to improve Soviet health care. According to the July 1936 decree establishing the People's Commissariat for Health, the commissariat had control over all financial assets related or linked to health care. As such, the ministry controlled all financial functions regarding health. It coordinated medical personnel all over the country, but also local council deputies. MOH was obliged to take active measures against deficiencies in the health care system, and to further develop and implement measures to improve it.

The MOH, with the help of other ministries and Soviet institutions, was responsible for the construction of new medical institutions around the country. Maintenance of hospital and other medical institutions were carried out by the MOH and the State Committee for Construction. According to the Regulations on the Ministry of Health of the USSR, MOH was responsible for maintenance and the construction of public health care services, and organising and conducting forensic medical and forensic psychiatric examination and establishing public pharmaceutical services. It was also assigned to develop and publish guidelines on organising and improving curative and preventive care, maternal and child health and to oversee the formulation of therapeutic and preventive work in health care.

The competence of the MOH within the jurisdiction of the USSR was periodically reviewed by the Council of Ministers.

== Organisation ==
The Ministry of Health was an all-union ministry, which meant that it controlled the fifteen ministries of health of the union republics. The union health ministries, in turn, were in charge of the autonomous oblasts and district health departments. The union ministries, along with the oblasts and the district health departments, were in control of the public hospitals and medicine in their area.

== History ==
A July 1936 decree by the Central Executive Committee and the Council of People's Commissars established the People's Commissariat for Health. Grigory Kaminsky, having served as People's Commissar for Health of the RSFSR, became the first commissar of the All-Union Commissariat for Health. Kaminsky was arrested in 1938 after his speech in 1937 which denounced the ongoing stalinist repression in the country (Great Purge). In a very short period of time since the formation of the commissariat, the diseases and viruses which had for a long time been a major problem had been eliminated. In 1946, the People's Commissariat for Health was renamed Ministry of Health.

== Commissars and ministers ==
The following persons headed the Commissariat/Ministry as commissars (narkoms), ministers, and deputy ministers of the Soviet time:

Name	Took office	Left office	Duration
People's Commissar for Health of the RSFSR and USSR
Nikolai Semashko	18 July 1918	26 January 1930	11 years, 192 days
Mikhail Vladimirsky	26 January 1930	15 February 1934	4 years, 20 days
Grigory Kaminsky	15 February 1934	26 June 1937	3 years, 131 days
Mikhail Boldyrev	2 August 1937	16 July 1938	348 days
Georgy Miterev	8 September 1939	15 March 1946	6 years, 188 days
Minister of Health of the USSR
Georgy Miterev	19 March 1946	17 February 1947	335 days
Yefim Smirnov	17 February 1947	9 December 1952	5 years, 296 days
Andrey Tretyakov	27 January 1953	1 March 1954	1 year, 33 days
Maria Kovrigina	1 March 1954	12 January 1959	4 years, 317 days
Sergei Kurashov	12 January 1959	27 August 1965	6 years, 227 days
Boris Petrovsky	8 September 1965	12 December 1980	15 years, 95 days
Sergei Burenkov	12 December 1980	26 December 1986	6 years, 14 days
Yevgeniy Chazov	17 February 1987	29 March 1990	3 years, 40 days
Igor Denisov	18 April 1990	26 November 1991	1 year, 222 days

== See also ==
- Government of the Soviet Union (Council of Ministers) – Ministries
  - Ministry of Medical Industry
