= Khlevensky District =

Khlevensky District Хлевенский район (Russian)
- District
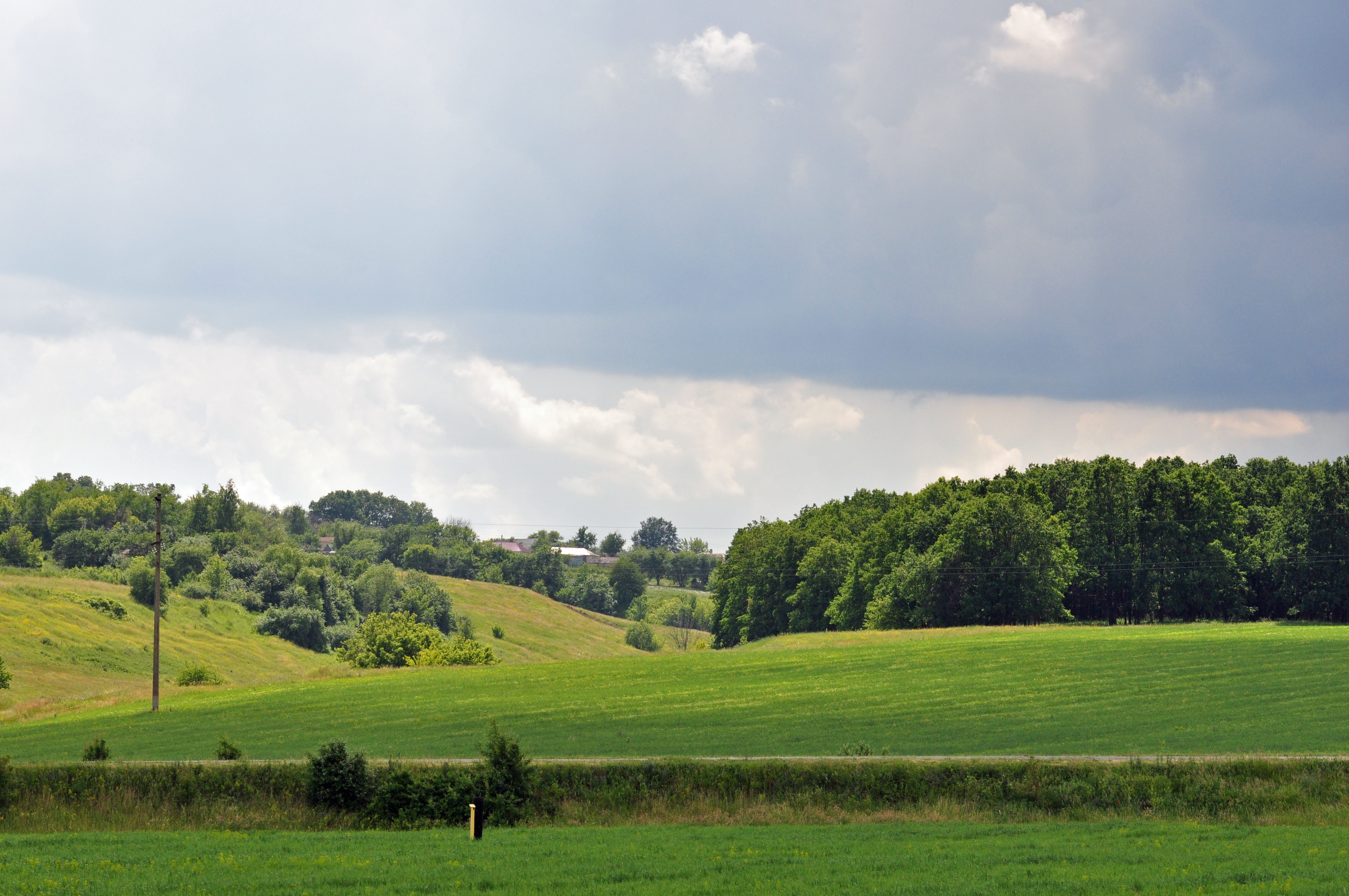
- Landscape in Khlevensky District

- Flag Coat of arms
- Location of Khlevensky District in Lipetsk Oblast
- Coordinates: 52°12′04″N 39°05′31″E
- Country: Russia
- Federal subject: Lipetsk Oblast
- Administrative center: Khlevnoye

Area
  - Total: 910 km^{2} (350 sq mi)

Population (2010 Census)
  - Total: 20,208
  - Density: 22/km^{2} (58/sq mi)
  - Urban: 0%
  - Rural: 100%

Administrative structure
  - Administrative divisions: 15 selsoviet
  - Inhabited localities: 48 rural localities

Municipal structure
  - Municipally incorporated as: Khlevensky Municipal District
  - Municipal divisions: 0 urban settlements, 15 rural settlements
- Time zone: UTC+3 (MSK)
- OKTMO ID: 42652000
- Website: http://admrhlevnoe.ru/

Khlevensky District (Russian: Хле́венский райо́н) is an administrative and municipal district (raion), one of the eighteen in Lipetsk Oblast, Russia. It is located in the south of the oblast. The area of the district is 910 square kilometers (350 sq mi). Its administrative center is the rural locality (a selo) of Khlevnoye. Population: 19,213 (2021 census); 20,208 (2010 census); 22,251 (2002 Census); 24,106 (1989 Soviet census). The population of Khlevnoye accounts for 31.3% of the district's total population.
