= Zadonsky Uyezd =

Zadonsky Uyezd (Задонский уезд) was one of the subdivisions of the Voronezh Governorate of the Russian Empire. It was situated in the northern part of the governorate. Its administrative centre was Zadonsk.

== Demographics ==
At the time of the Russian Empire Census of 1897, Zadonsky Uyezd had a population of 123,184. Of these, 99.9% spoke Russian as their native language.
