= Khava =

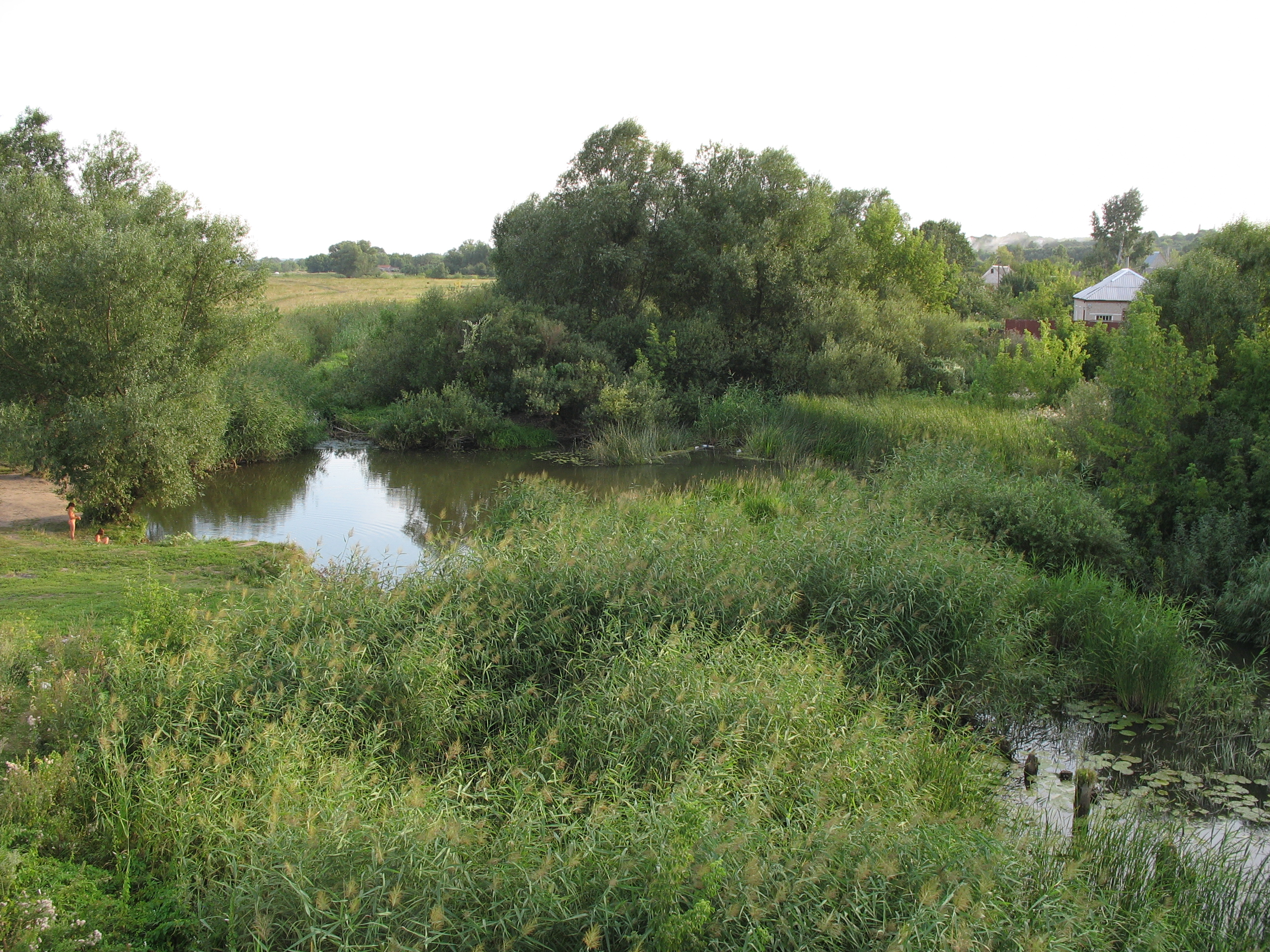
- The Khava in the village of Rozhdestvenskaya Khava
- Native name: Хава (Russian)

Location
- Country: Russia
- Region: Voronezh Oblast

Physical characteristics
- Mouth: Usman
  - coordinates: 51.6047°N 39.5202°E
- Length: 97 km (60 mi)
- Basin size: 1,460 km^{2} (560 sq mi)

Basin features
- Progression: Usman→ Voronezh→ Don→ Sea of Azov
- Tributaries
  - right: Pravaya Khava

The Khava (Russian: Хава) is a river in the Voronezh Oblast in Russia. It is a left tributary of the river Usman. It is 97 kilometres (60 mi) long, and has a drainage basin of 1,460 square kilometres (560 sq mi).

== Villages ==
- Verkhnyaya Khava
- Talovaya
- Sukhie Gai
- Pravaya Khava
- Rozhdestvenskaya Khava
- Uspenskaya Khava
- Volna-Shepelinovka
- Parusnoe
