= Plavitsa =

- Native name: Плавица (Russian)

Location
- Country: Russia
- Region: Voronezh Oblast, Lipetsk Oblast, Tambov Oblast

Physical characteristics
- Mouth: Matyra
  - coordinates: 52.4597°N 40.4046°E
- Length: 89 km (55 mi)
- Basin size: 964 km^{2} (372 sq mi)

Basin features
- Progression: Matyra→ Voronezh→ Don→ Sea of Azov

The Plavitsa (Russian: Плавица) is a river that flows within the basin of the river Don in Voronezh Oblast, Lipetsk Oblast and Tambov Oblast, Russia. The Plavitsa is a left tributary of the Matyra. It is 89 kilometres (55 mi) long, and has a drainage basin of 964 square kilometres (372 sq mi).
