= Usman, Russia =

Town in Lipetsk Oblast, Russia

Usmanʹ Усмань
- Town
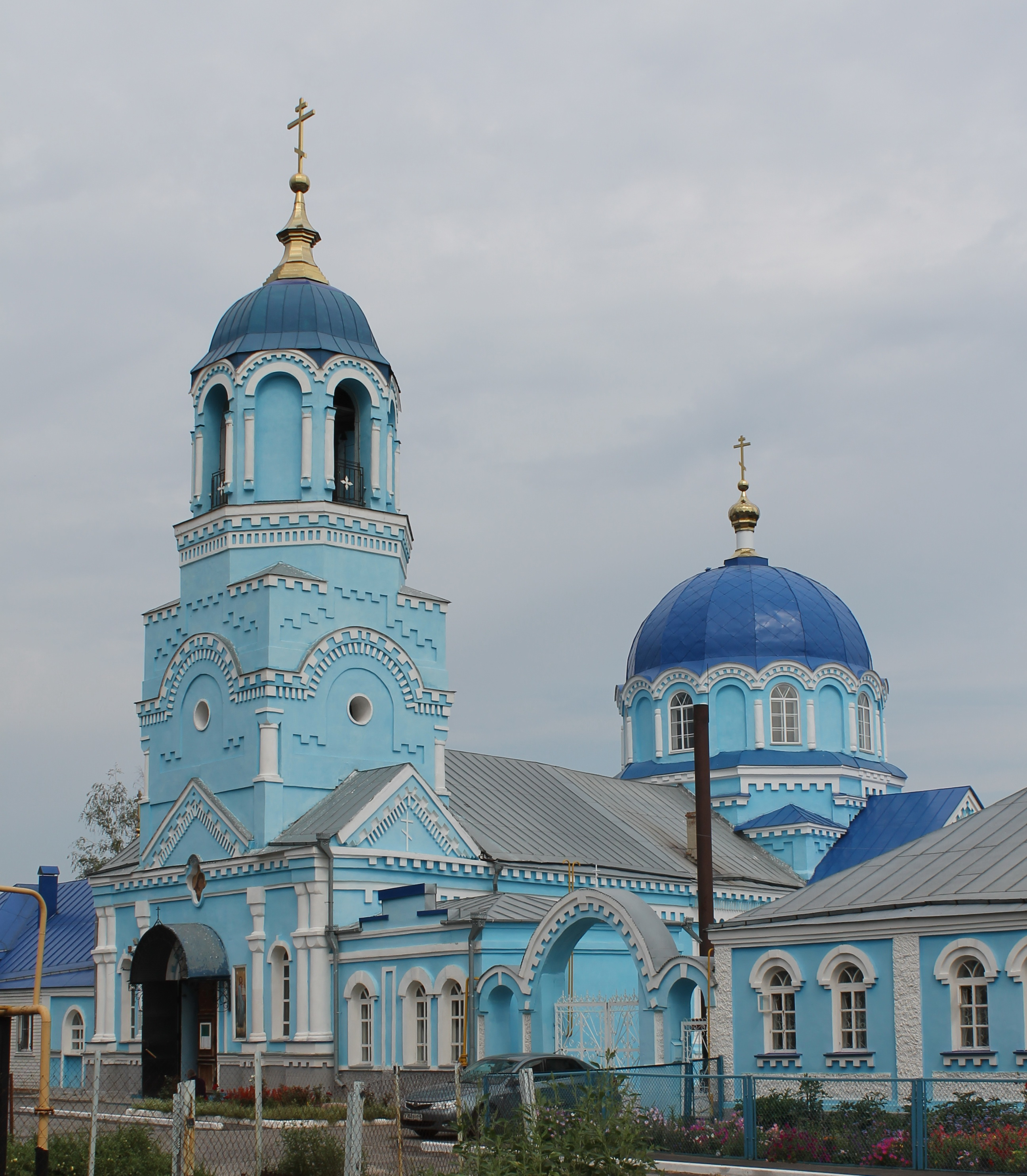

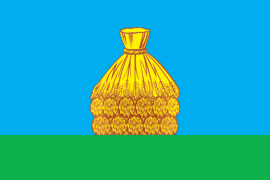
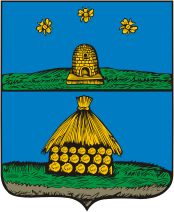
- Flag Coat of arms
- Interactive map of Usmanʹ
- Location of Usmanʹ Usmanʹ (Lipetsk Oblast)
- Coordinates: 52°03′N 39°44′E
- Country: Russia
- Federal subject: Lipetsk Oblast
- Administrative district: Usmansky District
- Town under district jurisdictionSelsoviet: Usman
- Founded: 1645
- Town status since: 1779
- Elevation: 140 m (460 ft)

Population (2010 Census)
  - Total: 18,685
  - Estimate (2021): 19,662 (+5.2%)

Administrative status
  - Capital of: Usmansky District, Usman Town Under District Jurisdiction

Municipal status
  - Municipal district: Usmansky Municipal District
  - Urban settlement: Usman Urban Settlement
  - Capital of: Usmansky Municipal District, Usman Urban Settlement
- Time zone: UTC+3 (MSK)
- Postal codes: 399370–399373, 399379
- OKTMO ID: 42648101001

Usman (Russian: У́смань) is a town and the administrative center of Usmansky District in Lipetsk Oblast, Russia, located on the Usman River, 75 kilometers (47 mi) south of Lipetsk, the administrative center of the oblast. Population: 19,662 (2021 census); 18,685 (2010 census); 20,133 (2002 census); 20,878 (1989 Soviet census).

== History ==
Founded in 1645, it was first an ostrog (fortress) on the Belgorod Line and named after the Usman River. In 1652, it was raided by the Tatars. It was granted town status in 1779.

== Administrative and municipal status ==
Within the framework of administrative divisions, Usman serves as the administrative center of Usmansky District. As an administrative division, it is incorporated within Usmansky District as Usman Town Under District Jurisdiction. As a municipal division, Usman Town Under District Jurisdiction is incorporated within Usmansky Municipal District as Usman Urban Settlement.

== Notable facts ==
- The minor planet 16515 Usmanʹgrad was named after the town.
- Usman was the birthplace of:
  - Nikolay Basov (1922–2001), co-recipient of the 1964 Nobel Prize in Physics
  - Astronomer Nikolai Chernykh (1931–2004), a discoverer of minor planets
  - Pyotr Nikolsky (1858–1940), a dermatologist
