= Rozhdestvenskaya Khava =

Rural locality in Novousmansky District, Voronezh Oblast, Russia

Coordinates: 51°40′N 39°40′E

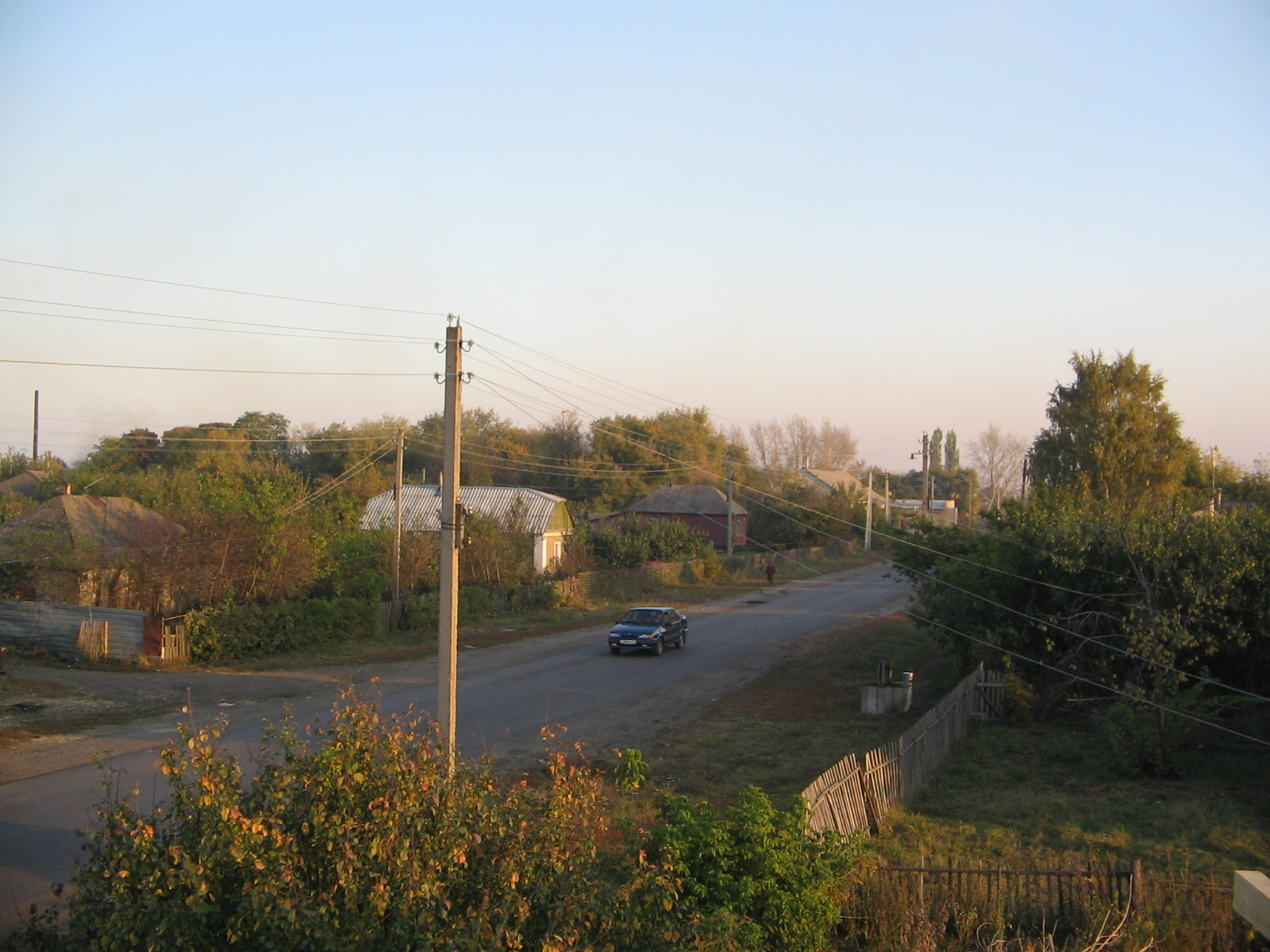
Entrance to Rozhdestvenskaya Khava

Rozhdestvenskaya Khava (Russian: Рожде́ственская Ха́ва) is a rural locality (a selo) in Novousmansky District of Voronezh Oblast, Russia, located on the right bank of the Khava River 35 kilometers (22 mi) from Voronezh. Population: over 2,000 (2002 est.).

== History ==
Founded in the first decade of the 18th century, it was named for a nativity church on the Khava River. In the 19th century the village was the center of Rozhdestvenskaya volost, Voronezhsky Uyezd, Voronezh Governorate. In 1859, it had 2,787 inhabitants living in 248 households.

== Facilities ==
There is a middle school, a music school, a library, a house of culture, a church, a bank, a hospital, a village council, a post office, a sawmill, and several grocery stores in Rozhdestnevskaya Khava.
