= Voronezhselmash =

Farm equipment manufacturer in Voronezh, Russia

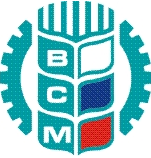

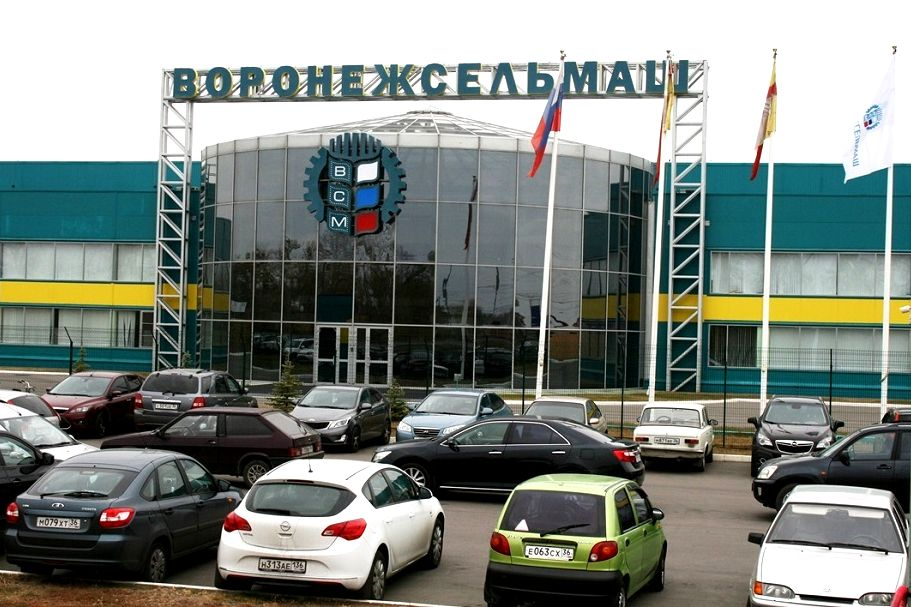
- Voronezhselmash
- Company type: Public
- Industry: Аgricultural engineering
- Founded: 1917
- Founders: Petichev Anton Nikolaevich
- Headquarters: Voronezh, Voronezh Oblast, Russia
- Area served: Worldwide
- Key people: Karpenko Roman Nikolaevich, Egor Koblik
- Products: Fotoseparators (Wheat, Mustard, Oat, Rice, Millet, Buckwheat and others); Fiber-optical sorters; Elevator equipment; Grain cleaning equipment; 3D printers
- Services: The general contractor for the construction of grain elevators, feed mills, seed lines
- Number of employees: 1000
- Website: http://vselmash.ru

Voronezhselmash (Russian: Воронежсельмаш) produces equipment for post-harvest handling, drying and storing grain, including grain elevators and separators. Construction of grain elevators for turnkey grain storage.
