= Russian ship of the line Goto Predestinatsia =

Russian ship

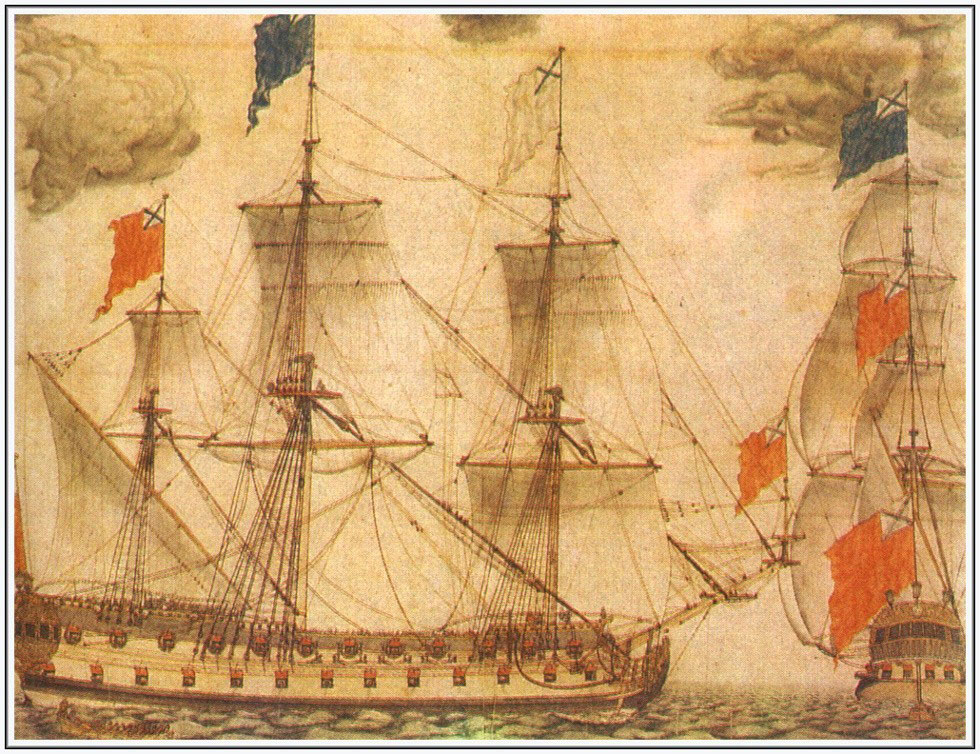
- Drawing of Goto Predestinatsia, Pieter Bergman, 1700

History

Russia
- Name: Goto Predestinatsia
- Laid down: 19 November 1698
- Launched: 27 April 1700
- Honours and awards: Ottoman–Venetian War (1714–1718)
- Fate: Sold in 1711

General characteristics
- Class & type: 58-gun ship of the line
- Length: 36 m (118 ft)
- Beam: 19.5 m (64 ft)
- Propulsion: Sails
- Sail plan: Full-rigged ship
- Complement: 253
- Armament: 58 guns: 26 × 16 pdrs; 24 × 8 pdrs; 8 × 3 pdrs

Goto Predestinatsia (God's Predestination, literally The Providence of God, Russian: Гото Предестинация) was a Russian 18th century navy flagship, 58-gun three-masted ship of the line.

She was commissioned on 27 April 1700 at the Voronezh Admiralty wharf, and was in service until 1711 as a part of the Azov flotilla. After the unsuccessful Prut campaign and the loss of Azov the Goto Predestinatsia was sold to the Ottoman Empire.

She was the first Russian ship of the line and the first ship of this rate built in Russia without any help from foreign experts.

== Replica ==
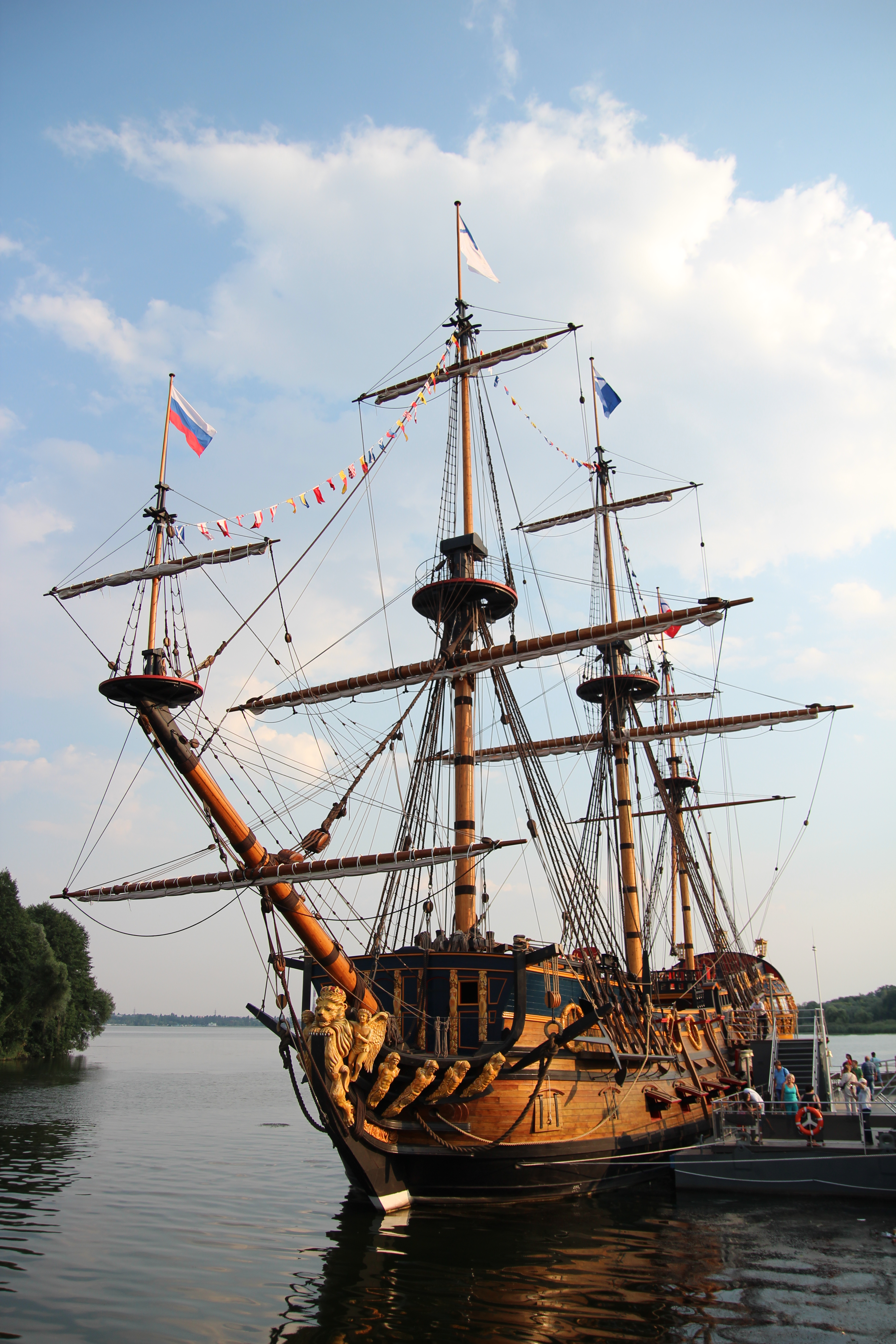
Replica of the Voronezh, built in 2014, Ship-Museum.

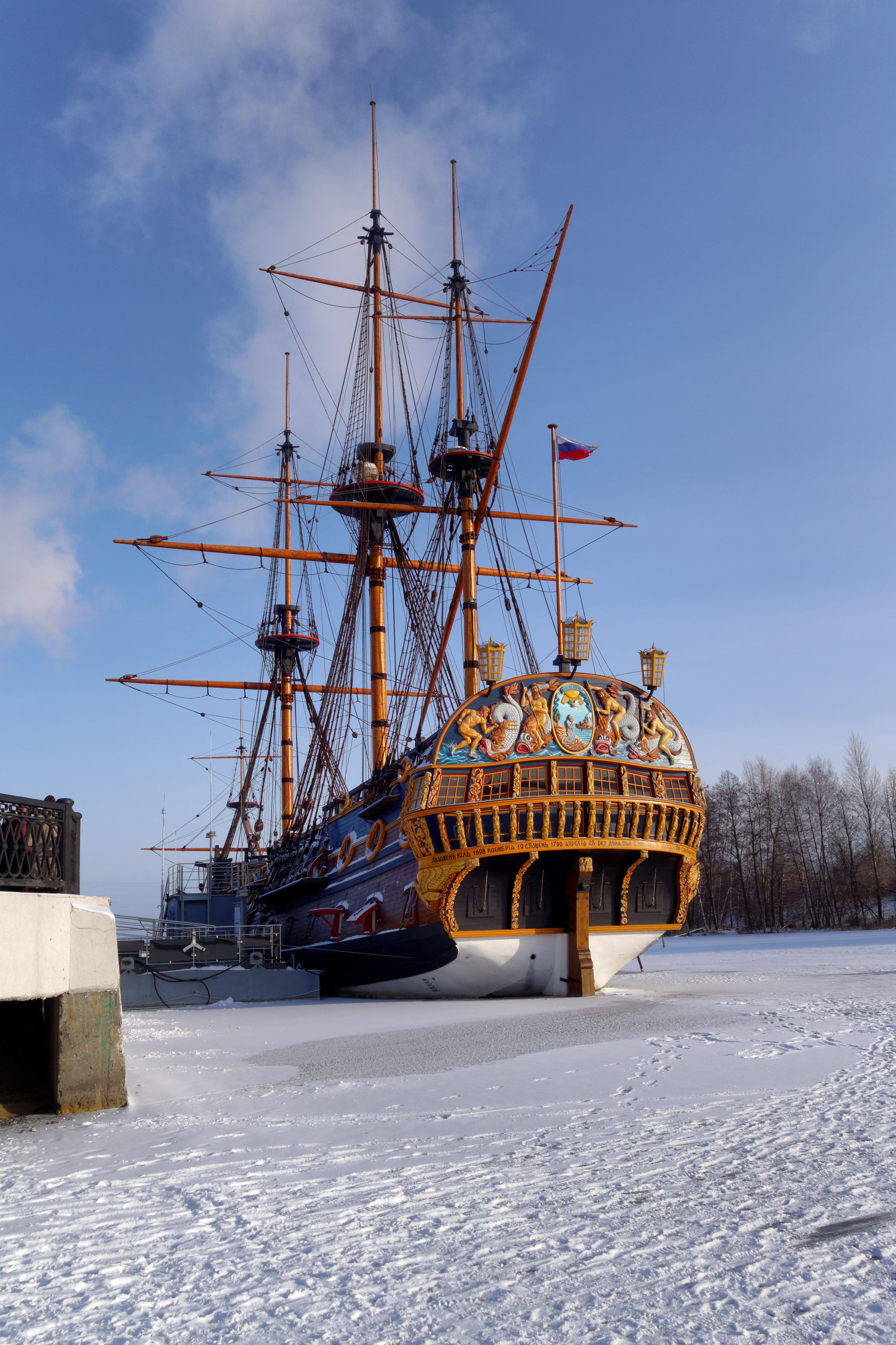
Replica of Goto Predestinatsia at Voronezh

== Sources ==
- Goto Predestinatsia (in Russian).
