= Usmansky District =

Usmansky District Усманский район (Russian)
- District
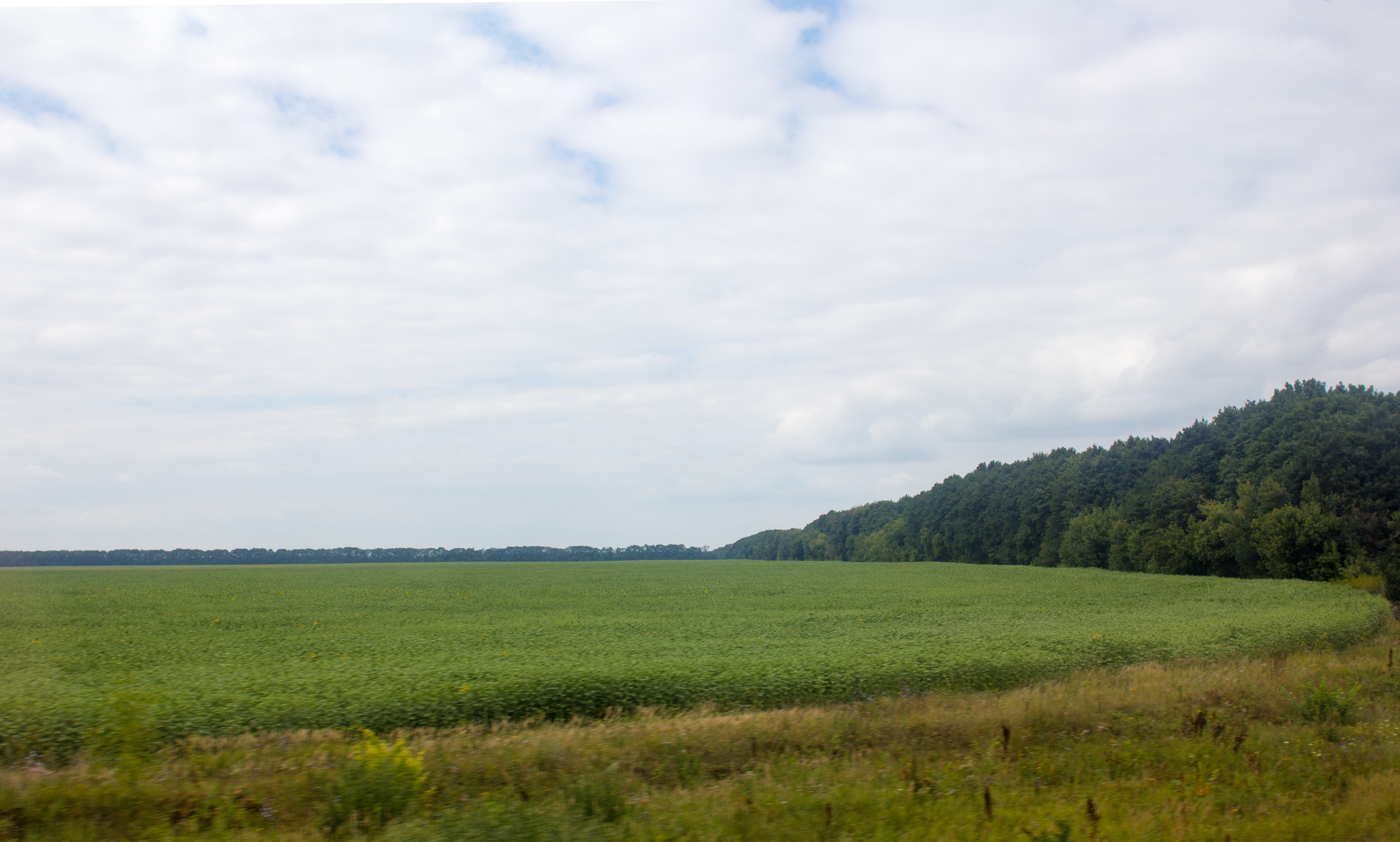
- Landscape in Usmansky District

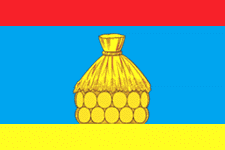
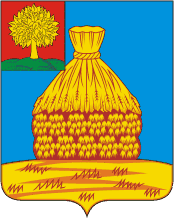
- Flag Coat of arms
- Location of Usmansky District in Lipetsk Oblast
- Coordinates: 52°03′N 39°44′E
- Country: Russia
- Federal subject: Lipetsk Oblast
- Established: 30 July 1928
- Administrative center: Usman

Area
  - Total: 1,910 km^{2} (740 sq mi)

Population (2010 Census)
  - Total: 50,906
  - Density: 26.7/km^{2} (69.0/sq mi)
  - Urban: 36.7%
  - Rural: 63.3%

Administrative structure
  - Administrative divisions: 1 Towns under district jurisdiction, 24 Selsoviets
  - Inhabited localities: 1 cities/towns, 62 rural localities

Municipal structure
  - Municipally incorporated as: Usmansky Municipal District
  - Municipal divisions: 1 urban settlements, 24 rural settlements
- Time zone: UTC+3 (MSK)
- OKTMO ID: 42648000
- Website: http://usmadm.ru

Usmansky District (Russian: У́сманский райо́н) is an administrative and municipal district (raion), one of the eighteen in Lipetsk Oblast, Russia. It is located in the southeast of the oblast. The area of the district is 1,910 square kilometers (740 sq mi). Its administrative center is the town of Usman. Population: 50,166 (2021 census); 50,906 (2010 census); 54,027 (2002 Census); 57,637 (1989 Soviet census). The population of Usman accounts for 39.2% of the district's total population.
