= Matyra =

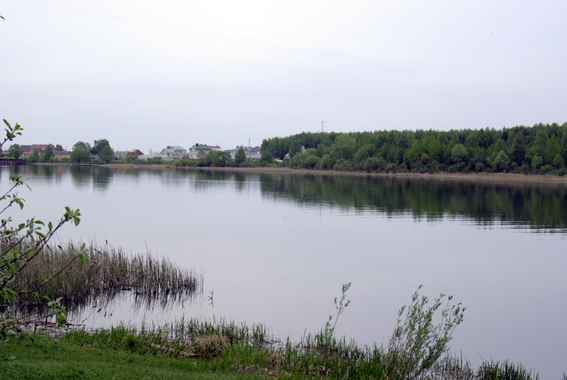
- Native name: Матыра (Russian)

Location
- Country: Russia

Physical characteristics
- Mouth: Voronezh
  - coordinates: 52.6255°N 39.6878°E
- Length: 180 km (110 mi)
- Basin size: 5,180 km^{2} (2,000 sq mi)

Basin features
- Progression: Voronezh→ Don→ Sea of Azov
- Tributaries
  - left: Plavitsa

The Matyra (Russian: Маты́ра) is a river in the Tambov and Lipetsk oblasts of Russia. It is a left tributary of the river Voronezh (in the Don's drainage basin). It has a length of 180 kilometres (110 mi) and a drainage basin of 5,180 square kilometres (2,000 sq mi). The average discharge 39 kilometres (24 mi) from its mouth is 11.7 cubic metres per second (410 cu ft/s). The town of Gryazi is along the Matyra.

A reservoir was created on the river in 1976.
