= Voronezh State Theater of Opera =

Voronezh State Opera and Ballet Theater
- Воронежский государственный театр оперы и балета
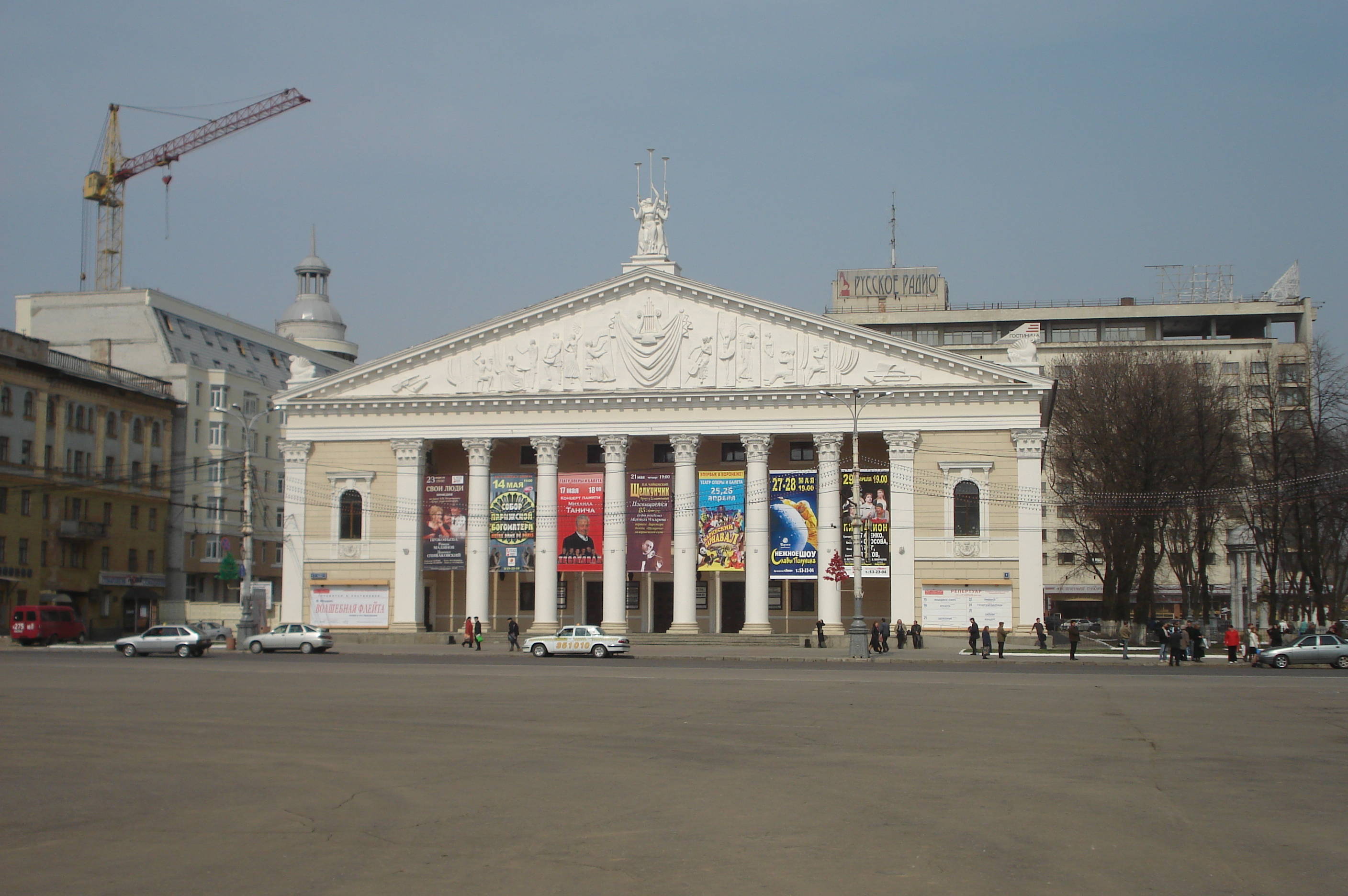
- Voronezh State Theater of Opera
- Interactive map of Voronezh State Opera and Ballet Theater
- Former names: Voronezh Musical Comedy Theater (1931–1960)
- Address: Voronezh, Russia
- Coordinates: 51°39′41″N 39°11′56″E
- Type: Opera and ballet theater

Construction
- Opened: 1931
- Rebuilt: 1961

Voronezh State Theater of Opera was founded in 1870 in Voronezh. It tours as the State Ballet Theater of Russia since 1961. Its General Director is Mr. Igor Nepomniachtchi, its artistic director is Mr. Alexandre Zykov, and the Principal Conductor is Mr. Youri Anissitchkine.

== History ==
The theater's history began in 1931 with the founding of the Musical Comedy Theater in Voronezh, which presented musical comedies and operettas. In 1960, it was renamed the Musical Theater at the initiative of Tikhon Khrennikov, who toured Voronezh in 1958. The theater was reconstructed in 1961. The date of February 25, 1961, is considered the birth of the Opera and Ballet Theater, as Eugene Onegin was performed on that day, followed by Swan Lake the next day.

Anatoli Lioudmiline (1903–1966), a People's Artist of the RSFSR, was instrumental in shaping the theater's repertoire in the 1960s, staging works such as Rigoletto, Aida, La Traviata, Carmen, Tosca, The Queen of Spades, Madama Butterfly, The Demon, and contemporary pieces. After his death, Iaroslav Vochtchak directed productions of Mazeppa, Il Trovatore, and A Russian Woman. In 1968, under his leadership, the theater received its current name.

Since the 1990s, the Principal Conductor has been Youri Anissitchkine, and the artistic director has been Alexandre Zykov. The theater has performed more than forty works over the past forty years and regularly tours abroad.

== See also ==
- Russian ballet
