= Pieter Bergman =

Pieter Bergman (Russian: Питер Бергман) was a Swedish-born officer of the Imperial Russian Navy in 1698 - 1706, cartographer.

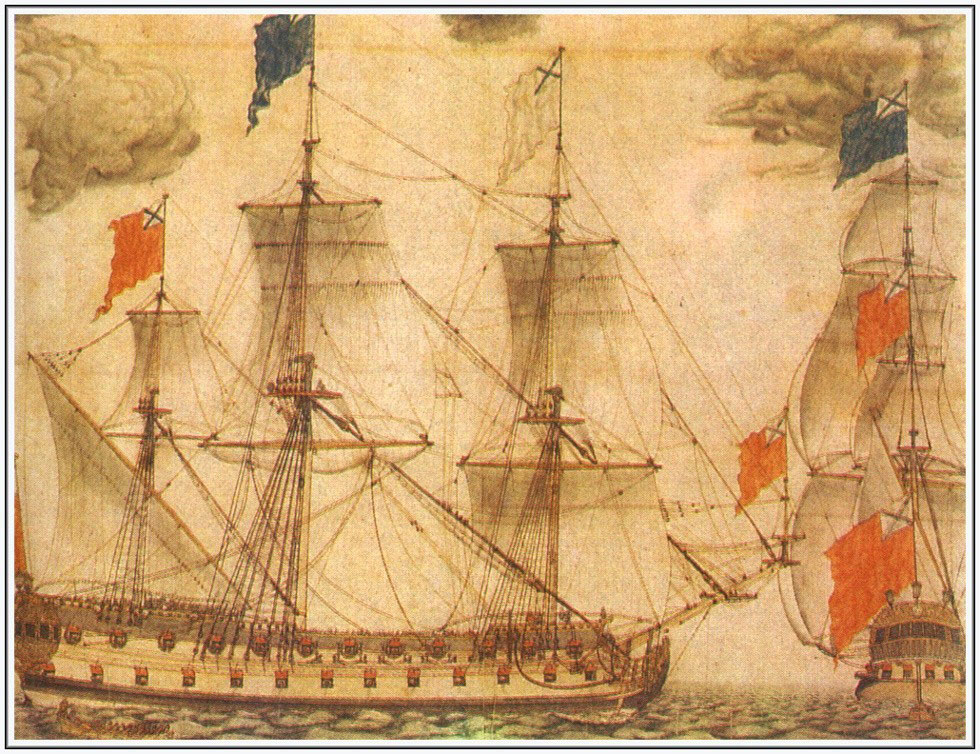
Pieter Bergman. Russian ship of the line Goto Predestinatsia

He has created a drawing of the Russian ship of the line Goto Predestinatsia and several maps of the sea of Azov.
