= Pravaya Khava =

Pravaya Khava Правая Хава
- Selo
- Location within Voronezh Oblast Location within Russia
- Coordinates: 51°43′N 39°47′E
- Country: Russia
- Region: Voronezh Oblast
- District: Verkhnekhavsky District
- Time zone: UTC+3:00

Pravaya Khava (Russian: Правая Хава) is a rural locality (a selo) and the administrative center of Pravokhavskoye Rural Settlement, Verkhnekhavsky District, Voronezh Oblast, Russia. The population was 563 as of 2010. There are 7 streets.

== Geography ==
Pravaya Khava is located 19 km southwest of Verkhnyaya Khava (the district's administrative centre) by road. Ilyinovka is the nearest rural locality.
