= Usman (river) =

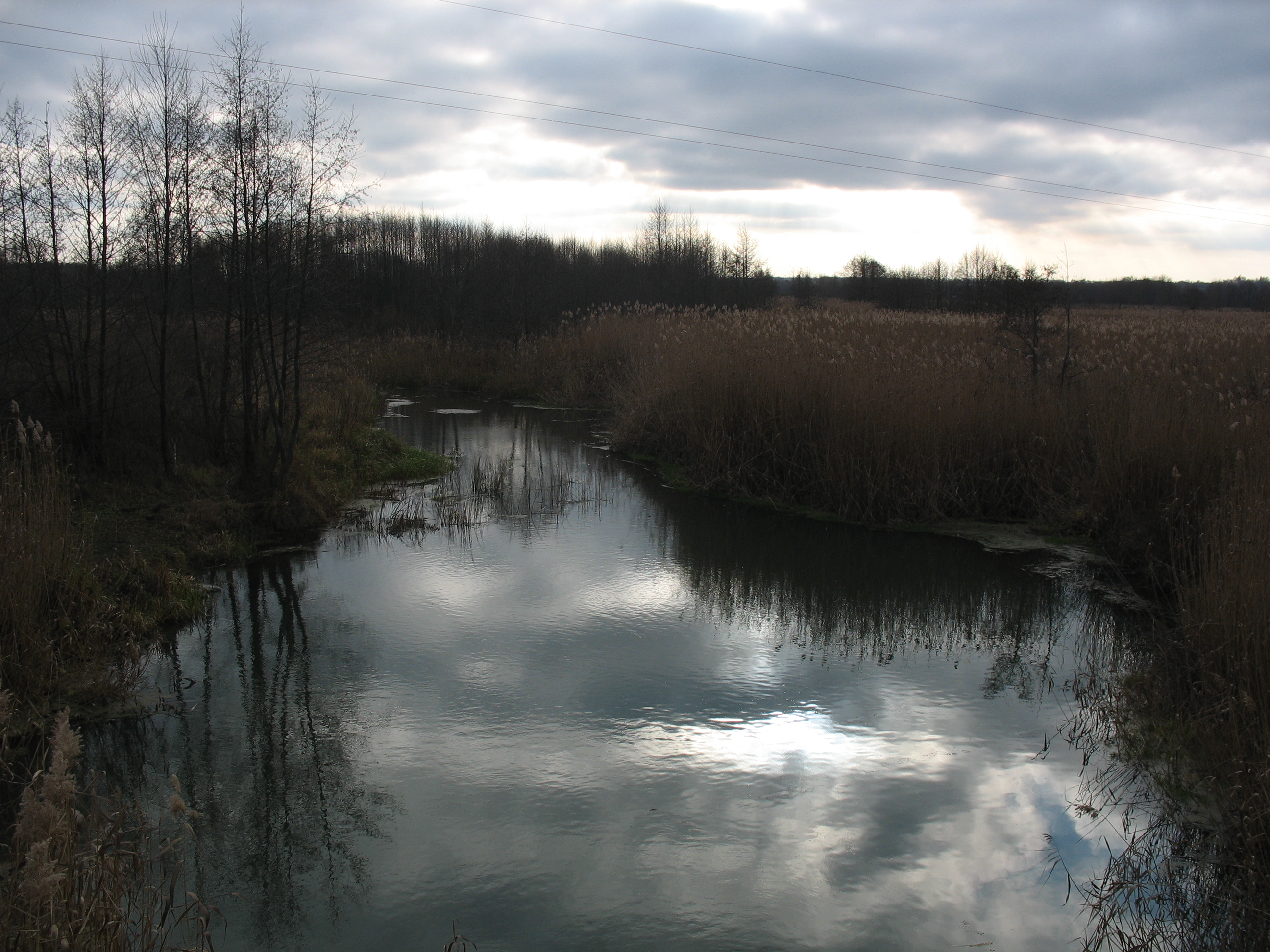
- Native name: Усмань (Russian)

Location
- Country: Russia

Physical characteristics
- Mouth: Voronezh
  - coordinates: 52.1332°N 39.7877°E
- Length: 151 km (94 mi)
- Basin size: 2,840 km^{2} (1,100 sq mi)

Basin features
- Progression: Voronezh→ Don→ Sea of Azov
- Tributaries
  - left: Khava

The Usman (Russian: У́смань) is a river in the Voronezh and Lipetsk oblasts of Russia. It is a left tributary of the river Voronezh, and is 151 kilometres (94 mi) long, with a drainage basin of 2,840 square kilometres (1,100 mi^{2}). The Usman is home to diverse species of aquatic life.
