= Voronezh =

City in Voronezh Oblast, Russia

Voronezh Воронеж
- City
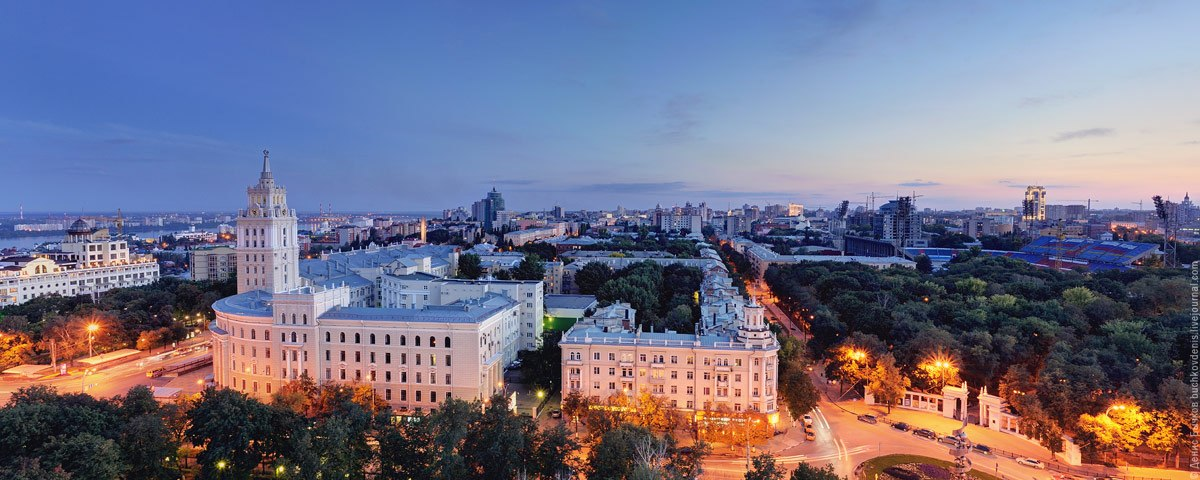
- Peter 1 monument Stone Bridge Uspenskiy Admiralty Temple Voronezh Puppet Theater "Shut" Voronezh State Theater of Opera The Main Office of the South-Eastern Railway

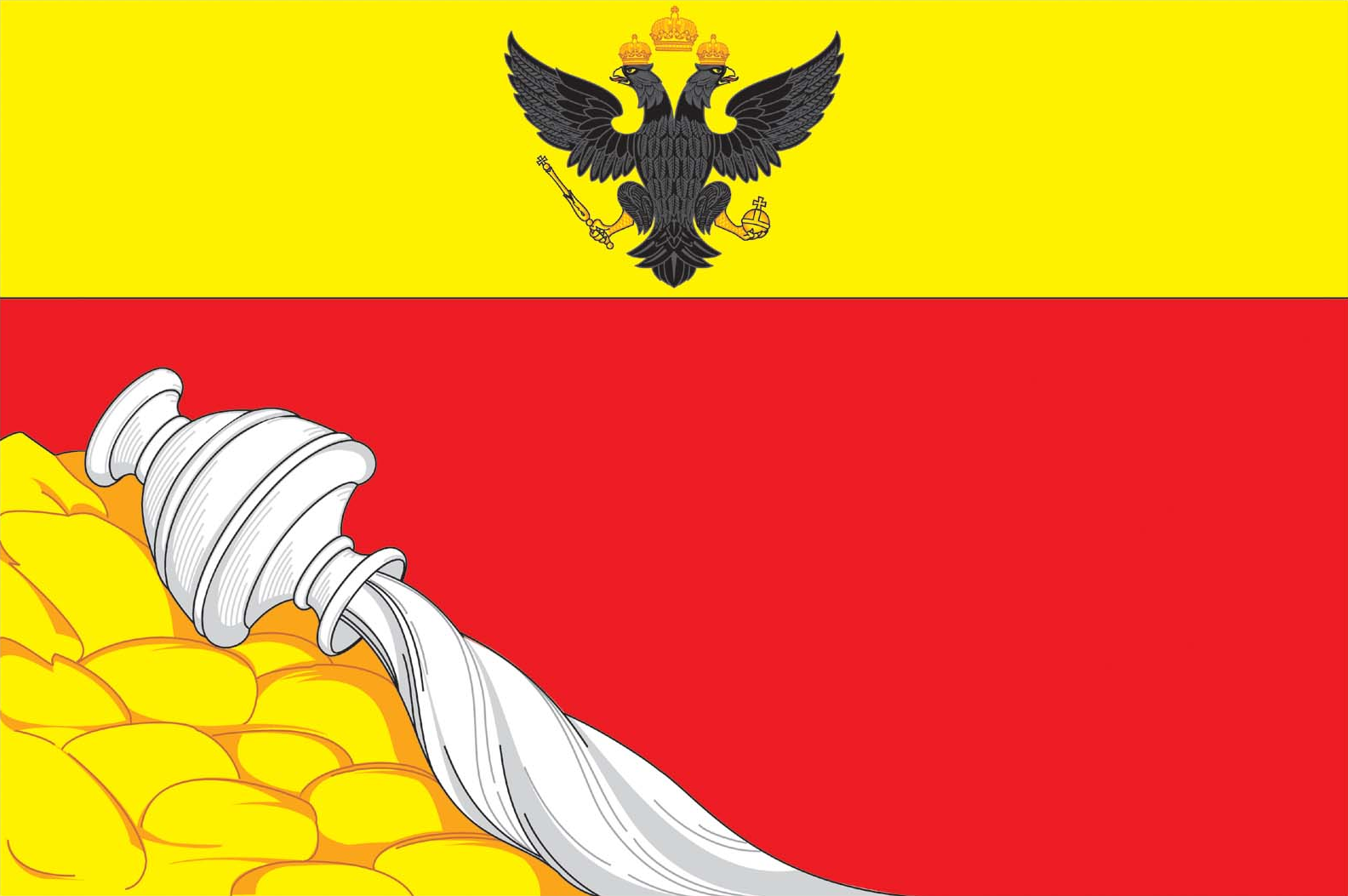
- Flag Coat of arms
- Interactive map of Voronezh
- Location of Voronezh Voronezh (Voronezh Oblast) Voronezh (European Russia) Voronezh (Europe)
- Coordinates: 51°40′18″N 39°12′38″E
- Country: Russia
- Federal subject: Voronezh Oblast
- Founded: 1586

Government
  - Body: City Duma
  - Mayor: Sergei Petrin

Area
  - Total: 601 km^{2} (232 sq mi)
- Elevation: 154 m (505 ft)

Population (2010 Census)
  - Total: 889,680
  - Estimate (2025): 1,041,722 (+17.1%)
  - Rank: 15th in 2010
  - Density: 1,480/km^{2} (3,830/sq mi)
- Demonym: none

Administrative status
  - Subordinated to: Voronezh Urban Okrug
  - Capital of: Voronezh Oblast, Voronezh Urban Okrug

Municipal status
  - Urban okrug: Voronezh Urban Okrug
  - Capital of: Voronezh Urban Okrug
- Time zone: UTC+3 (MSK)
- Postal code: 394000–394095
- Dialing code: +7 473
- OKTMO ID: 20701000001
- City Day: Third Saturday of September
- Website: www.voronezh-city.ru

Voronezh (Note: Alternatively romanized as Voronež or Voronège.) (Note: /vəˈroʊnɪʃ, -ˈrɒn-/ və-ROH-nish, -RO-; Russian: Воронеж, IPA: [vɐˈronʲɪʂ]) is a city and the administrative centre of Voronezh Oblast in southwestern Russia, straddling the Voronezh River 12 kilometers (7.5 mi) from where it flows into the Don River. The city sits on the Southeastern Railway, which connects western Russia with the Urals and Siberia, the Caucasus and Ukraine, and the M4 highway (Moscow–Voronezh–Rostov-on-Don–Novorossiysk). In recent years the city has experienced rapid population growth, rising to 1,057,681 in the 2021 Census, up from 889,680 recorded in the 2010 Census, making it the 14th-most populous city in the country.

== History ==
=== Foundation and name ===
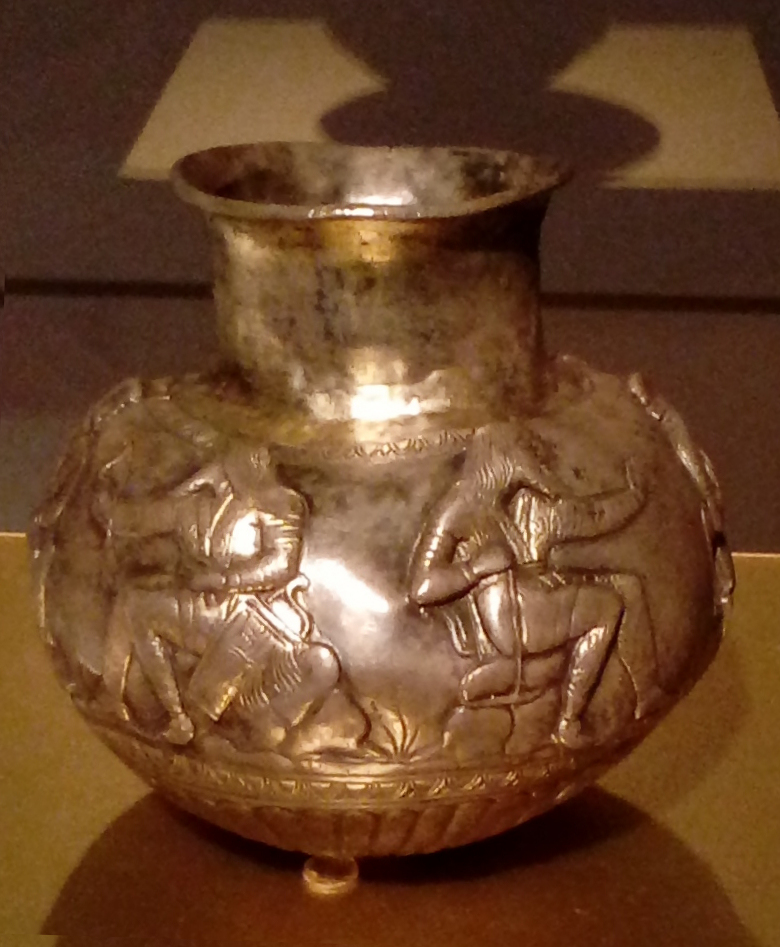
Scythian vessel from Voronezh, 4th century BC. Hermitage Museum.

The first chronicle references to the word Voronezh are dated 1177, when Yaropolk, the prince of Ryazan, having lost the battle, fled "to Voronozh" and there was moving "from town to town". Modern data of archaeology and history interpret Voronezh as a geographical region, which included the Voronezh River (a tributary of the Don) and a number of settlements. In the lower reaches of the river, a unique Slavic town-planning complex of the 8th to early 11th century was discovered, which covered the territory of the present city of Voronezh and its environs (about 42 km long, about 13 forts and many unfortified villages). By the 12th to 13th centuries, most of the old towns were desolate, but new settlements appeared upstream, closer to Ryazan.

For many years, the hypothesis of the Soviet historian Vladimir Zagorovsky dominated: he produced the toponym Voronezh from the hypothetical Slavic personal name Voroneg. This man allegedly gave the name of a small town in the Principality of Chernigov (now the village of Voronizh in Ukraine). Later, in the 11th or 12th century, the settlers were able to "transfer" this name to the Don region, where they named the second city Voronezh, and the river received its name from the city. However, now many researchers criticize the hypothesis, since in reality neither the name of Voroneg nor the second city was revealed, and usually the names of Russian cities repeated the names of the rivers, but not vice versa.

The linguistic comparative analysis of the name Voronezh was carried out by the Khovansky Foundation in 2009. There is an indication of the place names of many countries in Eurasia, which may partly be not only similar in sound, but also united by common Indo-European languages: Varanasi, Varna, Verona, Brno, etc.

A comprehensive scientific analysis was conducted in 2015–2016 by the historian Pavel Popov. His conclusion: Voronezh is a probable Slavic macrotoponym associated with outstanding signs of nature, has a root voron- (from Proto-Slavic vorn) in the meaning of "black, dark" and the suffix -ezh (-azh, -ozh). It was not "transferred" and in the 8th to 9th centuries it marked a vast territory covered with black forests (oak forests) – from the mouth of the Voronezh River to the Voronozhsky annalistic forests in the middle and upper reaches of the river, and in the west to the Don (many forests were cut down). This historian believes that the main "city" of the early town-planning complex could repeat the name of the region – Voronezh. Now the hillfort is located in the administrative part of the modern city, in the Voronezh upland oak forest. This is one of Europe's largest ancient Slavic hillforts, the area of which – more than 9 hectares – 13 times the area of the main settlement in Kiev before the baptism of Rus' in the year 988.

Folk etymology claims the name comes from combining the Russian words for raven (ворон, voron) and hedgehog (ёж, yozh) into Voronezh (Воронеж). According to this explanation, two Slavic tribes named after the animals used this combination to name the river which later in turn provided the name for a settlement. There is not believed to be any scientific support for this explanation.

In the 16th century, the Middle Don basin, including the Voronezh River, was gradually conquered by the Grand Principality of Moscow from the Nogai Horde (a successor state of the Golden Horde), and the current city of Voronezh was established in 1586 by Feodor I as a fort protecting the Muravsky Trail trade route against the slave raids of the Nogai and Crimean Tatars. The city was named after the river.

=== 17th to 19th centuries ===
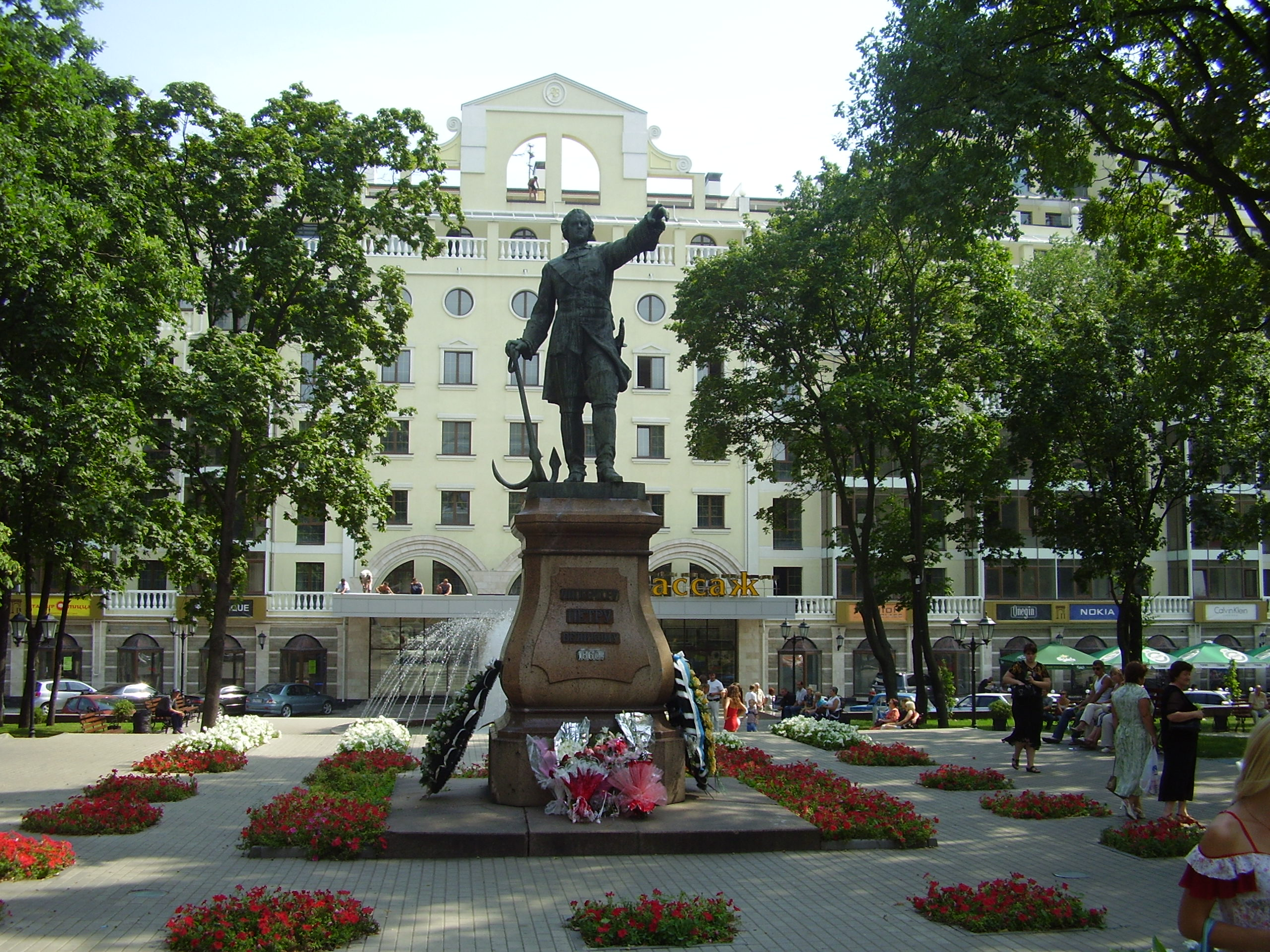
A monument to Peter the Great

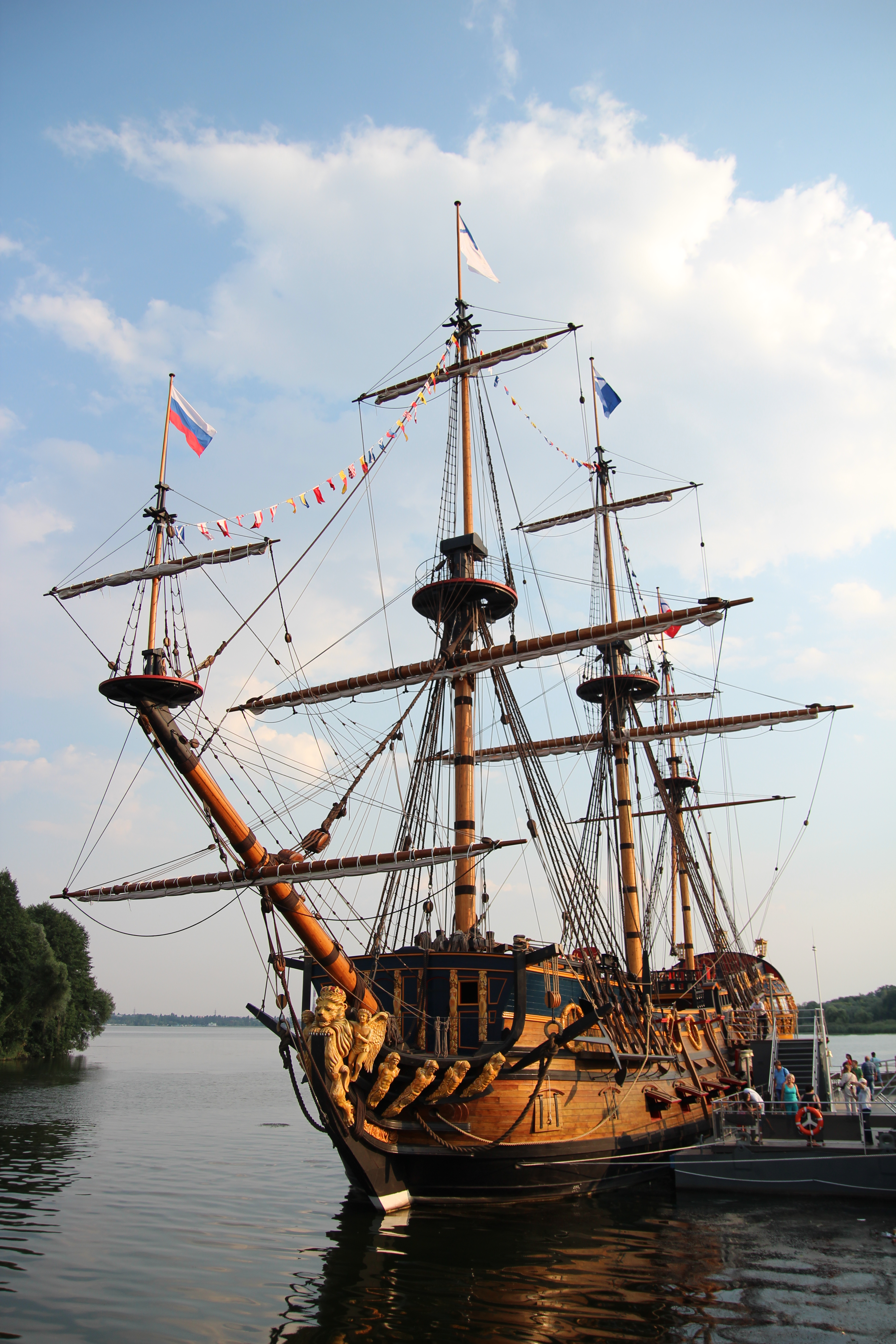
Voronezh. Ship Museum Goto Predestinatsia

In the 17th century, Voronezh gradually evolved into a sizable town. Weronecz is shown on the Worona river in Resania in Joan Blaeu's map of 1645. Peter the Great built a dockyard in Voronezh where the Azov Flotilla was constructed for the Azov campaigns in 1695 and 1696. This fleet, the first ever built in Russia, included the first Russian ship of the line, Goto Predestinatsia. The Orthodox diocese of Voronezh was instituted in 1682 and its first bishop, Mitrofan of Voronezh, was later proclaimed the town's patron saint.

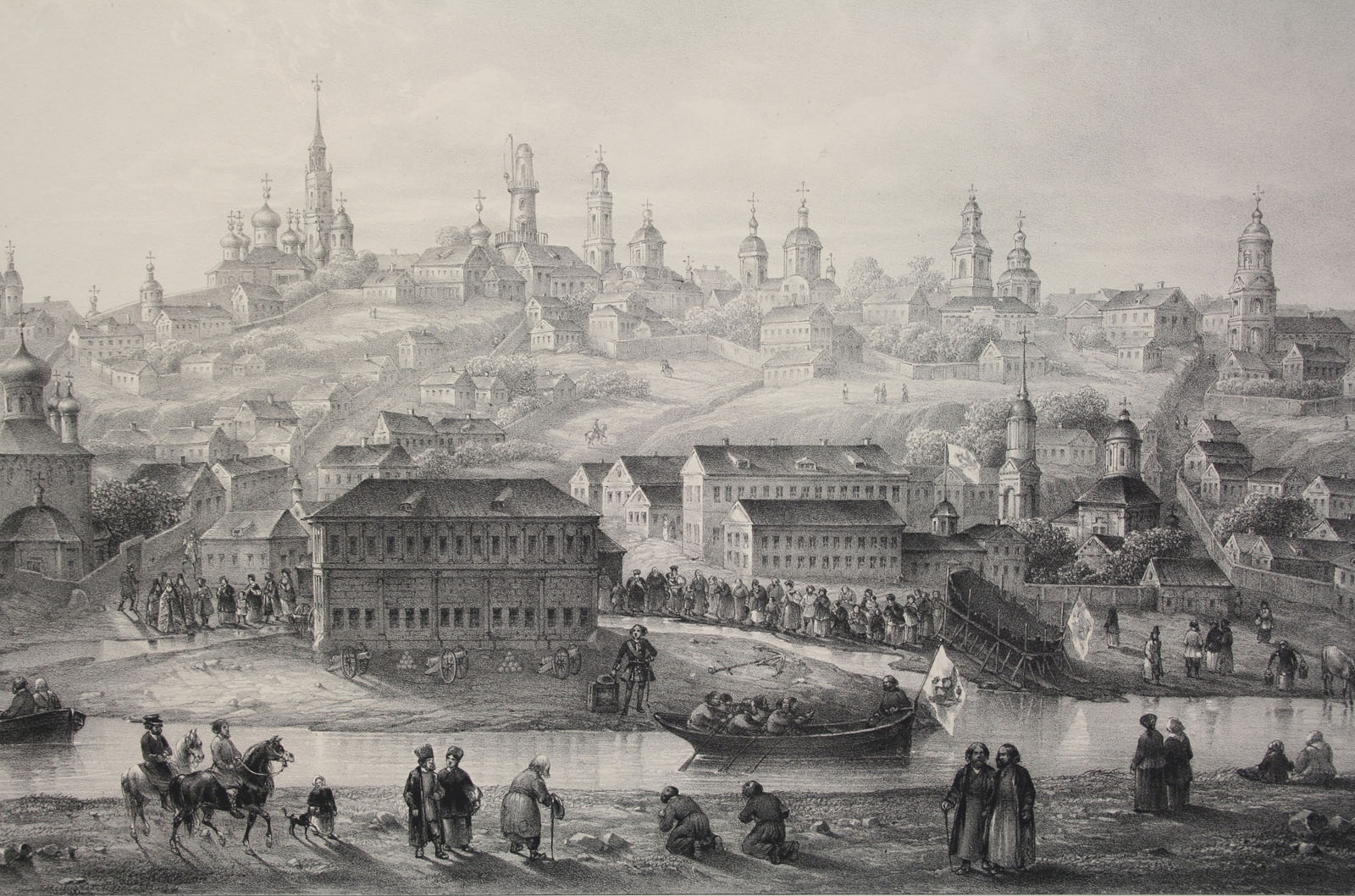
View of Voronezh in the 18th century

Owing to the Voronezh Admiralty Wharf, for a short time, Voronezh became the largest city of South Russia and the economic center of a large and fertile region. In 1711, it was made the seat of the Azov Governorate, which eventually morphed into the Voronezh Governorate.

In the 19th century, Voronezh was the center of Voronezh Governorate. Manufacturing industry (mills, tallow-melting, butter-making, soap, leather, and other works) as well as bread, cattle, suet, and the hair trade developed in the town. A railway connected Voronezh with Moscow in 1868 and Rostov-on-Don in 1871.

=== 20th century ===
==== World War II ====
During World War II, Voronezh was the scene of fierce fighting between Soviet and combined Axis troops. The Germans used it as a staging area for their attack on Stalingrad, and made it a key crossing point on the Don River. In June 1941, two BM-13 (Fighting machine #13 Katyusha) artillery installations were built at the Voronezh excavator factory. In July, the construction of Katyushas was rationalized so that their manufacture became easier and the time of volley repetition was shortened from five minutes to fifteen seconds. More than 300 BM-13 units manufactured in Voronezh were used in a counterattack near Moscow in December 1941. In October 22, 1941, the advance of the German troops prompted the establishment of a defense committee in the city. On November 7, 1941, there was a troop parade, devoted to the anniversary of the October Revolution. Only three such parades were organized that year: in Moscow, Kuybyshev, and Voronezh. In late June 1942, the city was attacked by German and Hungarian forces. In response, Soviet forces formed the Voronezh Front. By July 6, the German army occupied the western river-bank suburbs before being subjected to a fierce Soviet counter-attack. By July 24 the frontline had stabilised along the Voronezh River as the German forces continued southeast into the Great Bend of the Don. The attack on Voronezh represented the first phase of the German Army's 1942 campaign in the Soviet Union, codenamed Case Blue.

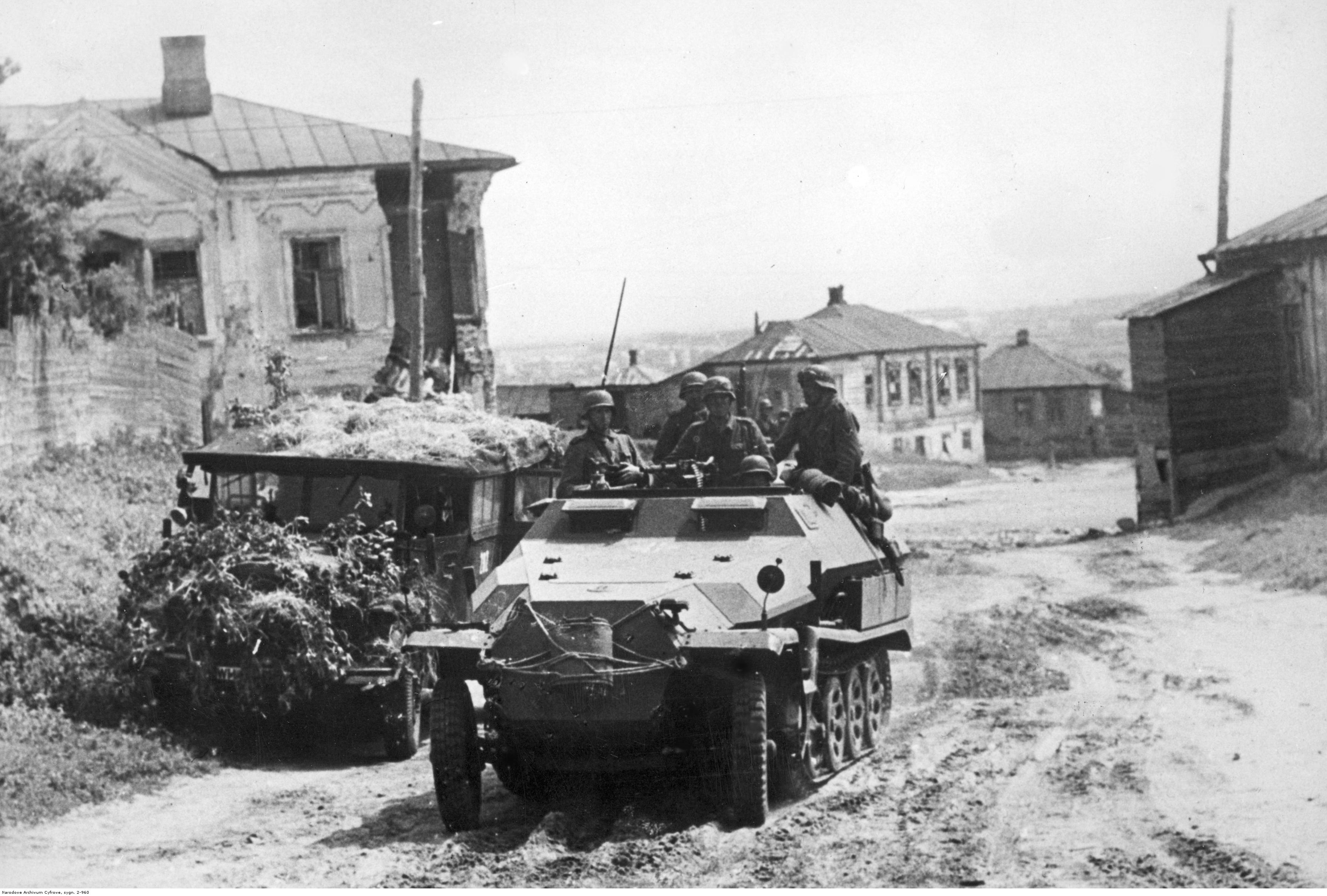
German mechanized forces on their way to Voronezh, July 1942

Until January 25, 1943, parts of the Second German Army and the Second Hungarian Army occupied the western part of Voronezh. During Operation Little Saturn, the Ostrogozhsk–Rossosh Offensive, and the Voronezhsko-Kastornenskoy Offensive, the Voronezh Front exacted heavy casualties on Axis forces. On January 25, 1943, Voronezh was liberated after ten days of combat. During the war the city was almost completely ruined, with 92% of all buildings destroyed.

==== Post-war ====
By 1950, Voronezh had been rebuilt. Most buildings and historical monuments were repaired. It was also the location of a prestigious Suvorov Military School, a boarding school for young boys who were considered to be prospective military officers, many of whom had been orphaned by war.

In 1950–1960, new factories were established: a tire factory, a machine-tool factory, a factory of heavy mechanical pressing, and others. In 1968, Serial production of the Tupolev Tu-144 supersonic plane was established at the Voronezh Aviation factory. In October 1977, the first Soviet domestic wide-body plane, Ilyushin Il-86, was built there.

In 1989, TASS published details of an alleged UFO landing in the city's park and purported encounters with extraterrestrial beings reported by a number of children. A Russian scientist that was cited in initial TASS reports later told the Associated Press that he was misquoted, cautioning, "Don't believe all you hear from TASS," and "We never gave them part of what they published", and a TASS correspondent admitted the possibility that some "make-believe" had been added to the TASS story, saying, "I think there is a certain portion of truth, but it is not excluded that there is also fantasizing".

From 1989 onwards explorers found burials of those shot during the Great Terror and in 1993 the wooded land of Dubovka was turned into a memorial area where they were reburied.

=== 21st century ===
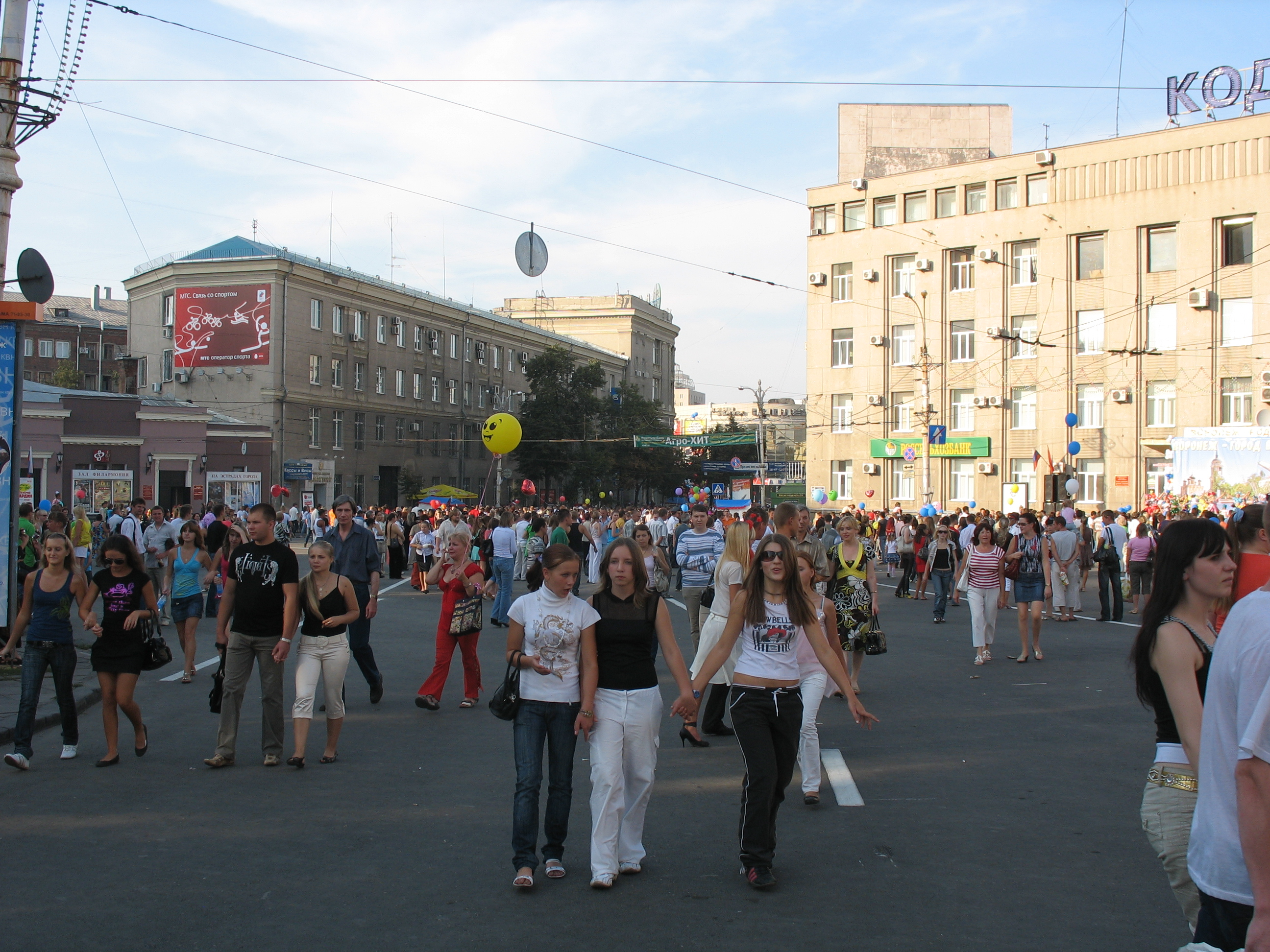
City Day in Voronezh in 2008

From 10 to 17 September 2011, Voronezh celebrated its 425th anniversary. The anniversary of the city was given the status of a federal scale celebration that helped attract large investments from the federal and regional budgets for development. On December 17, 2012, Voronezh became the fifteenth city in Russia with a population of over one million people. Today Voronezh is the economic, industrial, cultural, and scientific center of the Central Black Earth Region. As part of the annual tradition in the Russian city of Voronezh, every winter the main city square is thematically drawn around a classic story. In 2020, the city was decorated using the motifs from Pyotr Ilyich Tchaikovsky's The Nutcracker. In the year of 2021, the architects drew inspiration from Hans Christian Andersen's fairy tale The Snow Queen as well as the animation classic The Snow Queen from the Soviet Union. The fairy tale replica city will feature the houses of Kai and Gerda, the palace of the snow queen, an ice rink, and illumination.

In June 2023, during the Wagner Group rebellion, forces of the Wagner Group took control of the military facilities in the city. Later they were confirmed to have taken the city itself.

On the night of 27 October 2024, during the Russo-Ukrainian War, Ukraine launched a drone attack on two distilleries in Voronezh, distilleries that make rocket and aviation fuel and explosives.

== Administrative and municipal status ==
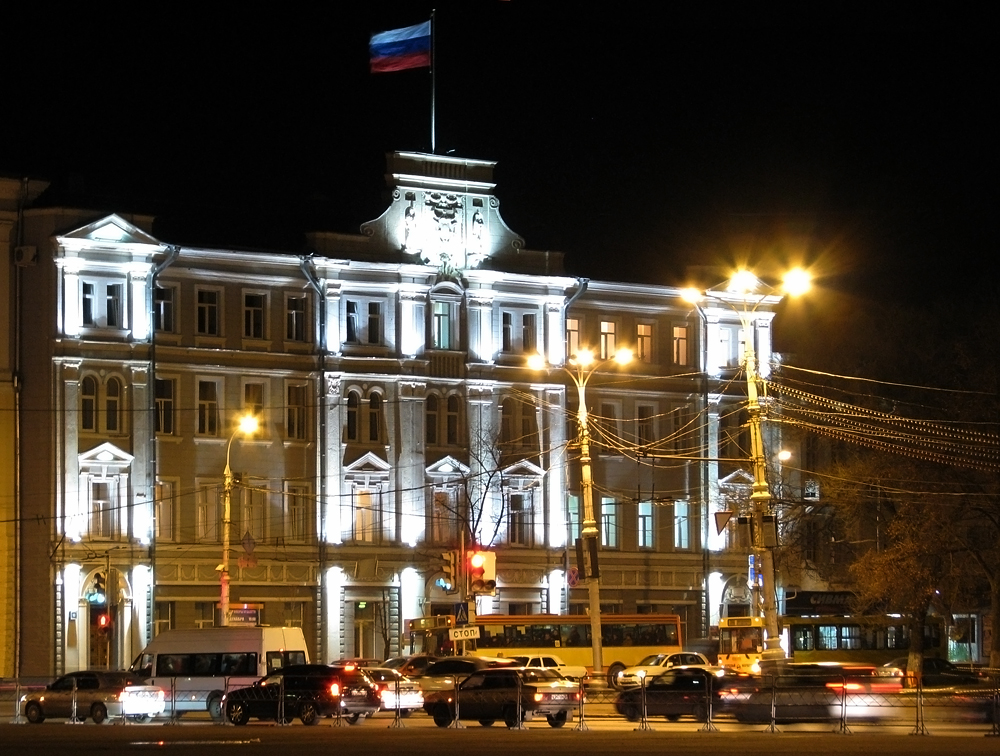
The Mayor's office of Voronezh

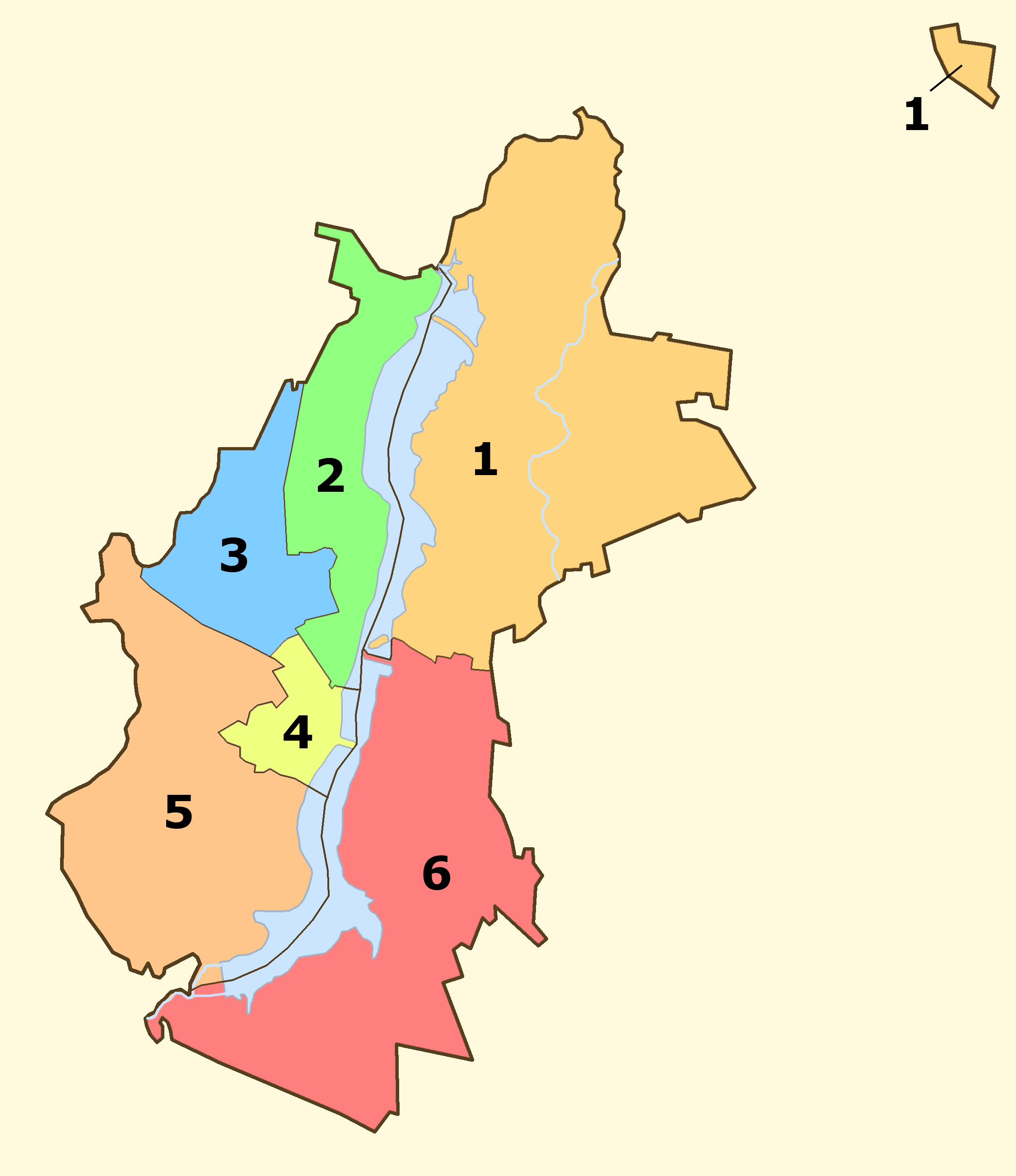
Administrative districts of Voronezh

Voronezh is the administrative center of the oblast. Within the framework of administrative divisions, it is incorporated as Voronezh Urban Okrug—an administrative unit with the status equal to that of the districts. As a municipal division, this administrative unit also has urban okrug status.

=== City divisions ===
The city is divided into six administrative districts:

1. Zheleznodorozhny (183,17 km²)
2. Tsentralny (63,96 km²)
3. Kominternovsky (47,41 km²)
4. Leninsky (18,53 km²)
5. Sovetsky (156,6 km²)
6. Levoberezhny (123,89 km²)

=== Demographics ===
Historical population
Year	Pop.	±%
1897	80,599	—
1926	118,191	+46.6%
1939	326,932	+176.6%
1959	447,164	+36.8%
1970	660,182	+47.6%
1979	782,950	+18.6%
1989	886,844	+13.3%
2002	848,752	−4.3%
2010	889,680	+4.8%
2021	1,057,681	+18.9%
Source: Census data

At the time of the official 2021 Census, the ethnic makeup of the city's population whose ethnicity was known (960,357) was:

Ethnicity	Population	Percentage
Russians	918,247	95.6%
Ukrainians	4,806	0.5%
Armenians	4,416	0.5%
Tajiks	1,946	0.2%
Uzbeks	1,707	0.2%
Azerbaijanis	1,679	0.2%
Turkmens	1,383	0.1%
Others	26,173	2.7%

== Economy ==
The leading sectors of the urban economy in the 20th century were mechanical engineering, metalworking, the electronics industry and the food industry.

In the city are such companies as:

- Voronezh Aircraft Production Association (where, amongst other types, the Tupolev Tu-144 was built)

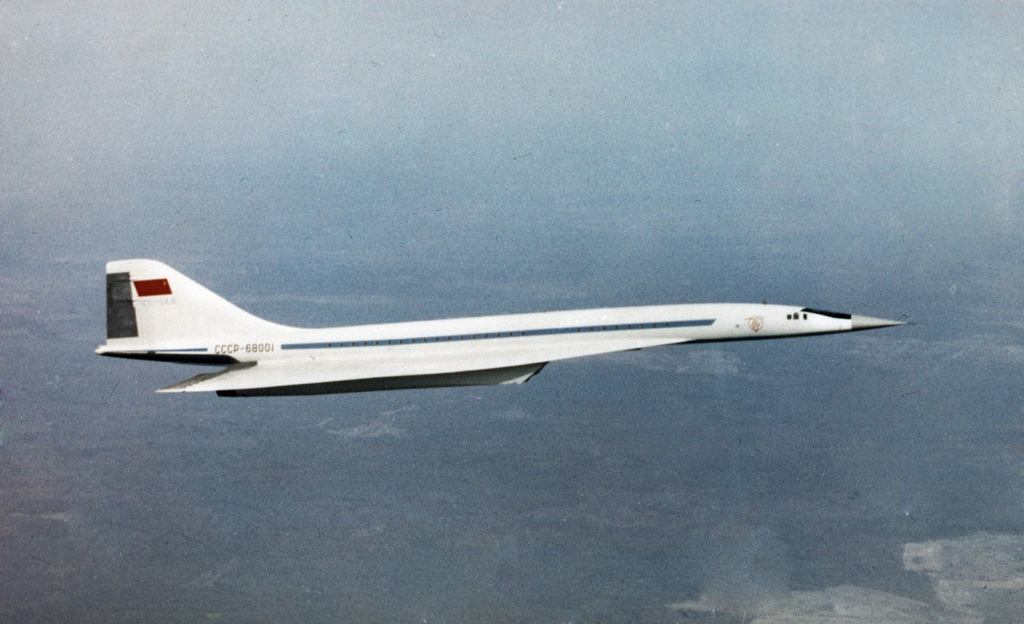
Tupolev Tu-144

- Voronezhselmash (agricultural engineering)
- Sozvezdie (headquarter, JSC Concern “Sozvezdie”, creator of the Altai radiotelephone)
- Verofarm (pharmaceutics, owner Abbott Laboratories),
- Voronezh Mechanical Plant (production of missile and aircraft engines, oil and gas equipment)
- Mining Machinery Holding - RUDGORMASH (production of drilling, mineral processing and mining equipment)
- VNiiPM Research Institute of Semiconductor Engineering (equipment for plasma-chemical processes, technical-chemical equipment for liquid operations, water treatment equipment)
- KBKhA Chemical Automatics Design Bureau with notable products:
- Pirelli Voronezh.
- Koltsovsky Market in Voronezh

On the territory of the city district government Maslovka Voronezh region with the support of the Investment Fund of Russia, is implementing a project to create an industrial park, "Maslowski", to accommodate more than 100 new businesses, including the transformer factory of Siemens. On September 7, 2011 in Voronezh there opened a Global network operation center of Nokia Siemens Networks, which was the fifth in the world and the first in Russia.

=== Construction ===
In 2014, 926,000 square meters of housing was delivered.

== Geography ==
=== Urban layout ===
Information about the original urban layout of Voronezh is contained in the "Patrol Book" of 1615. At that time, the city fortress was logged and located on the banks of the Voronezh River. In plan, it was an irregular quadrangle with a perimeter of about 238 meter. inside it, due to lack of space, there was no housing or siege yards, and even the cathedral church was supposed to be taken out. However, at this small fortress there was a large garrison—666 households of service people. These courtyards were reliably protected by the second line of fortifications by a standing prison on taras with 25 towers covered with earth; behind the prison was a moat, and beyond the moat there were stakes. Voronezh was a typical military settlement (ostrog).

In the city prison there were only settlements of military men: Streletskaya, Kazachya, Belomestnaya atamanskaya, Zatinnaya and Pushkarskaya. The posad population received the territory between the ostrog and the river, where the Monastyrskaya settlements (at the Assumption Monastery) was formed. Subsequently, the Yamnaya Sloboda was added to them, and on the other side of the fort, on the Chizhovka Mountain, the Chizhovskaya Sloboda of archers and Cossacks appeared. As a result, the Voronezh settlements surrounded the fortress in a ring. The location of the parish churches emphasized this ring-like and even distribution of settlements: the Ilyinsky Church of the Streletskaya Sloboda, the Pyatnitskaya Cossack and Pokrovskaya Belomestnaya were brought out to the passage towers of the prison. The Nikolskaya Church of the Streletskaya Sloboda was located near the marketplace (and, accordingly, the front facade of the fortress), and the paired ensemble of the Rozhdestvenskaya and Georgievskaya churches of the Cossack Sloboda marked the main street of the city, going from the Cossack Gate to the fortress tower.

=== Climate ===
Voronezh has a humid continental climate (Köppen: Dfb) with long, cold winters and warm to hot summers. Winters are slightly milder than in areas further north and east, and snow season last shorter than in these areas. Summer temperatures can often go over 35 °C (95 °F), and sometimes over 40 °C (104 °F).

Climate data for Voronezh (1991–2020, extremes 1918–present)
Month	Jan	Feb	Mar	Apr	May	Jun	Jul	Aug	Sep	Oct	Nov	Dec	Year
Record high °C (°F)	8.6 (47.5)	11.0 (51.8)	22.7 (72.9)	29.2 (84.6)	35.7 (96.3)	38.9 (102.0)	40.1 (104.2)	40.5 (104.9)	34.4 (93.9)	26.5 (79.7)	18.2 (64.8)	12.4 (54.3)	40.5 (104.9)
Mean daily maximum °C (°F)	−3.4 (25.9)	−2.6 (27.3)	3.6 (38.5)	14.4 (57.9)	21.7 (71.1)	25.0 (77.0)	27.2 (81.0)	26.5 (79.7)	19.7 (67.5)	11.5 (52.7)	3.0 (37.4)	−1.9 (28.6)	12.1 (53.8)
Daily mean °C (°F)	−6.0 (21.2)	−5.7 (21.7)	−0.3 (31.5)	8.7 (47.7)	15.5 (59.9)	19.1 (66.4)	21.1 (70.0)	19.9 (67.8)	14.0 (57.2)	7.4 (45.3)	0.4 (32.7)	−4.3 (24.3)	7.5 (45.5)
Mean daily minimum °C (°F)	−8.5 (16.7)	−8.5 (16.7)	−3.5 (25.7)	3.9 (39.0)	9.8 (49.6)	13.7 (56.7)	15.6 (60.1)	14.2 (57.6)	9.2 (48.6)	4.0 (39.2)	−1.9 (28.6)	−6.6 (20.1)	3.5 (38.3)
Record low °C (°F)	−36.5 (−33.7)	−36.2 (−33.2)	−32.0 (−25.6)	−16.8 (1.8)	−3.3 (26.1)	−1.6 (29.1)	5.0 (41.0)	0.4 (32.7)	−5.2 (22.6)	−15.2 (4.6)	−25.1 (−13.2)	−33.4 (−28.1)	−36.5 (−33.7)
Average precipitation mm (inches)	42 (1.7)	39 (1.5)	38 (1.5)	41 (1.6)	48 (1.9)	61 (2.4)	58 (2.3)	52 (2.0)	51 (2.0)	51 (2.0)	43 (1.7)	48 (1.9)	572 (22.5)
Average extreme snow depth cm (inches)	16 (6.3)	22 (8.7)	16 (6.3)	1 (0.4)	0 (0)	0 (0)	0 (0)	0 (0)	0 (0)	0 (0)	2 (0.8)	9 (3.5)	22 (8.7)
Average rainy days	8	6	8	12	13	15	13	10	13	14	13	9	134
Average snowy days	21	20	14	3	0.2	0	0	0	0.1	3	12	20	93
Average relative humidity (%)	84	82	77	66	61	67	68	67	73	79	85	85	75
Mean monthly sunshine hours	62	86	125	184	268	284	286	254	185	111	45	38	1,928
Source 1: Pogoda.ru.net
Source 2: NOAA (sun, 1961–1990)

== Transportation ==
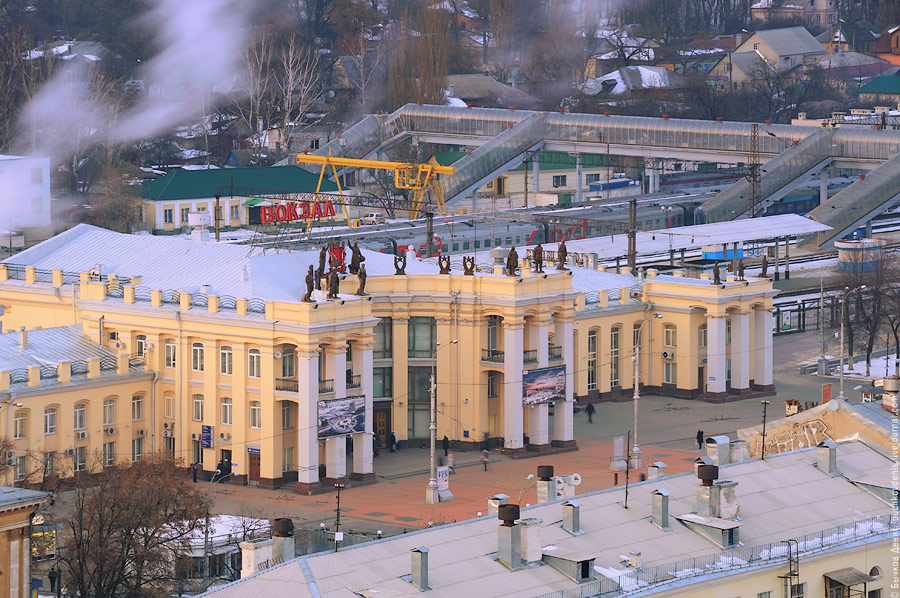
Voronezh railway station

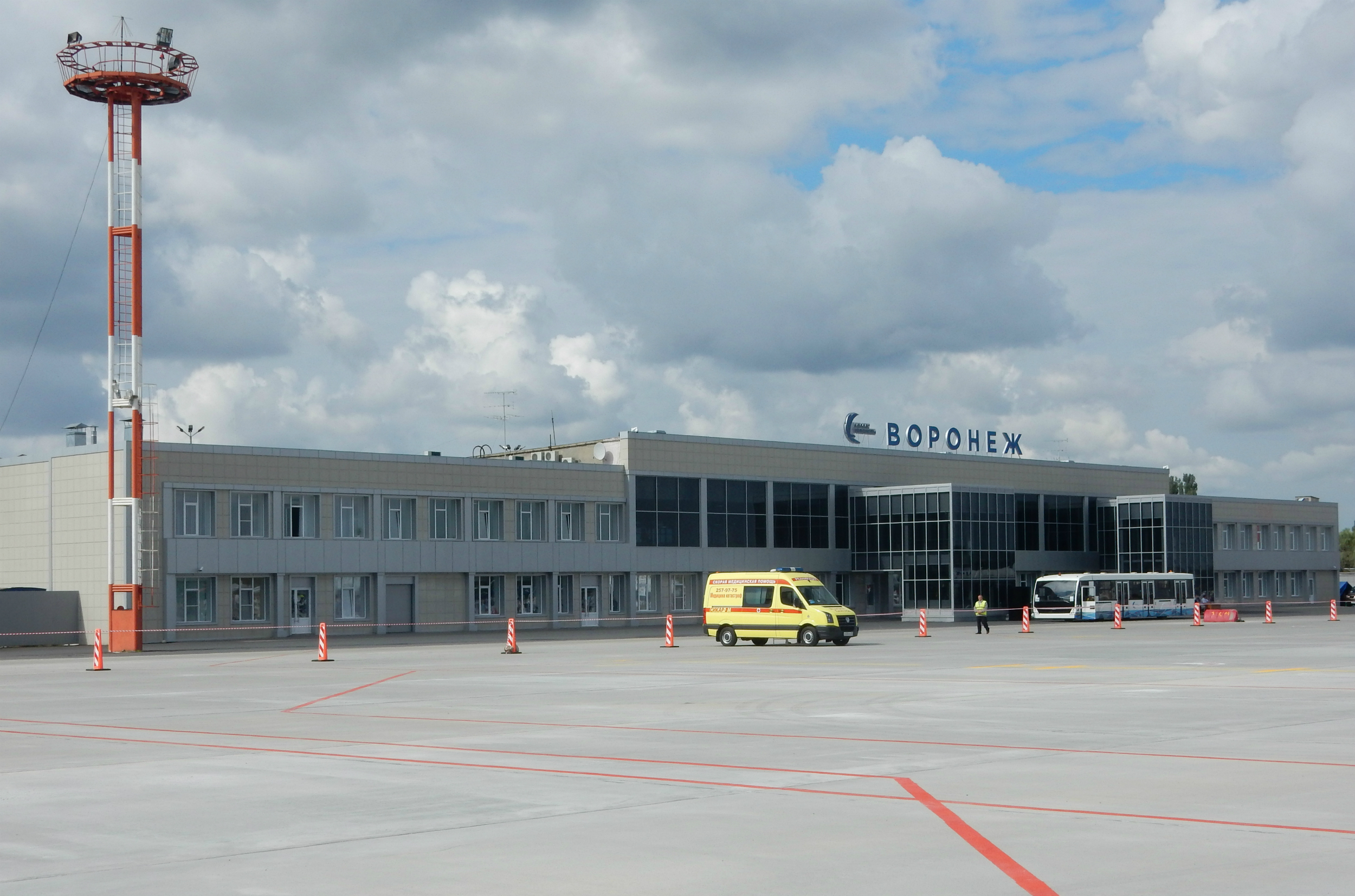
Voronezh International Airport

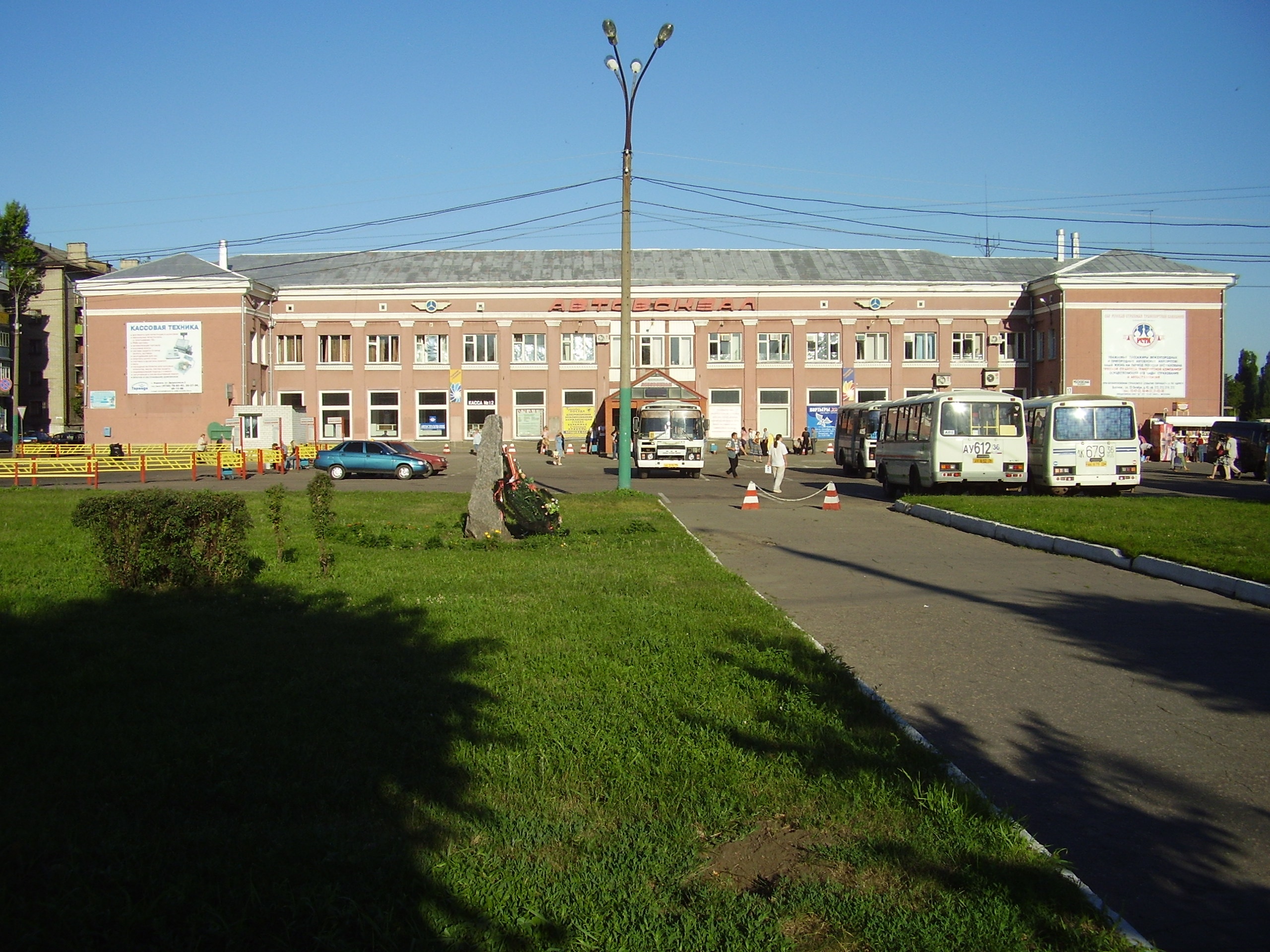
Voronezh Bus Station

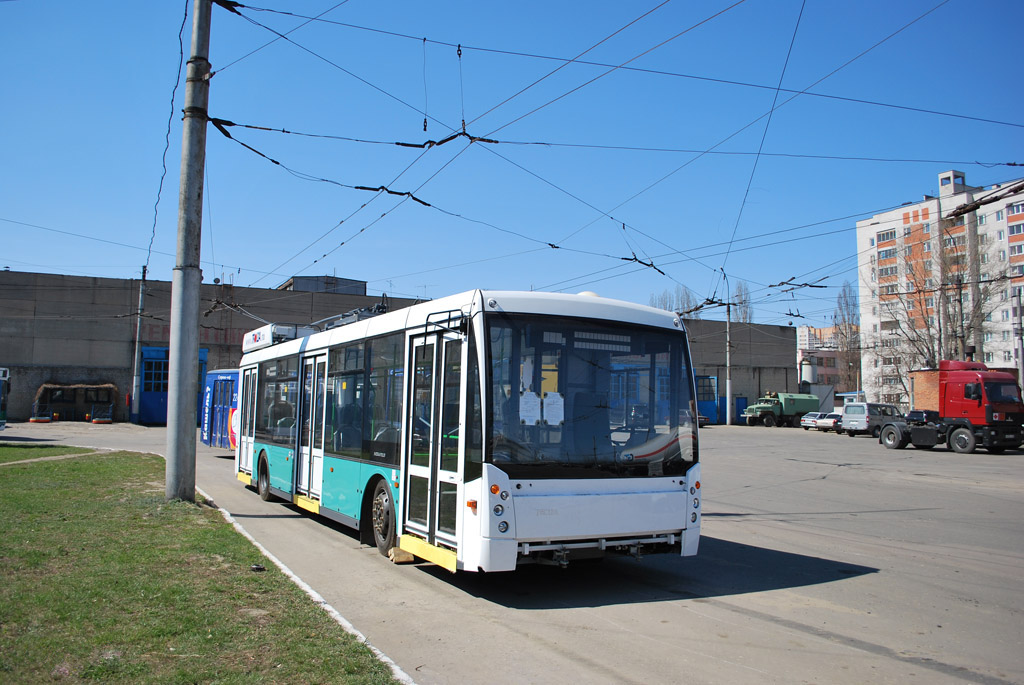
A Trolleybus in Voronezh

=== Air ===
The city is served by the Voronezh International Airport, which is located north of the city and is home to Polet Airlines. Voronezh is also home to the Pridacha Airport, a part of a major aircraft manufacturing facility VASO (Voronezhskoye Aktsionernoye Samoletostroitelnoye Obshchestvo, Voronezh aircraft production association) where the Tupolev Tu-144 (known in the West as the "Concordski"), was built and the only operational unit is still stored. Voronezh also hosts the Voronezh Malshevo air force base in the southwest of the city, which, according to a Natural Resources Defense Council report, houses nuclear bombers.

=== Rail ===
Since 1868, there is a railway connection between Voronezh and Moscow. Rail services form a part of the South Eastern Railway of the Russian Railways. Destinations served direct from Voronezh include Moscow, Kyiv, Kursk, Novorossiysk, Sochi, and Tambov. The main train station is called Voronezh-1 railway station and is located in the center of the city.

=== Bus ===
There are three bus stations in Voronezh that connect the city with destinations including Moscow, Belgorod, Lipetsk, Volgograd, Rostov-on-Don, and Astrakhan.

== Education and culture ==
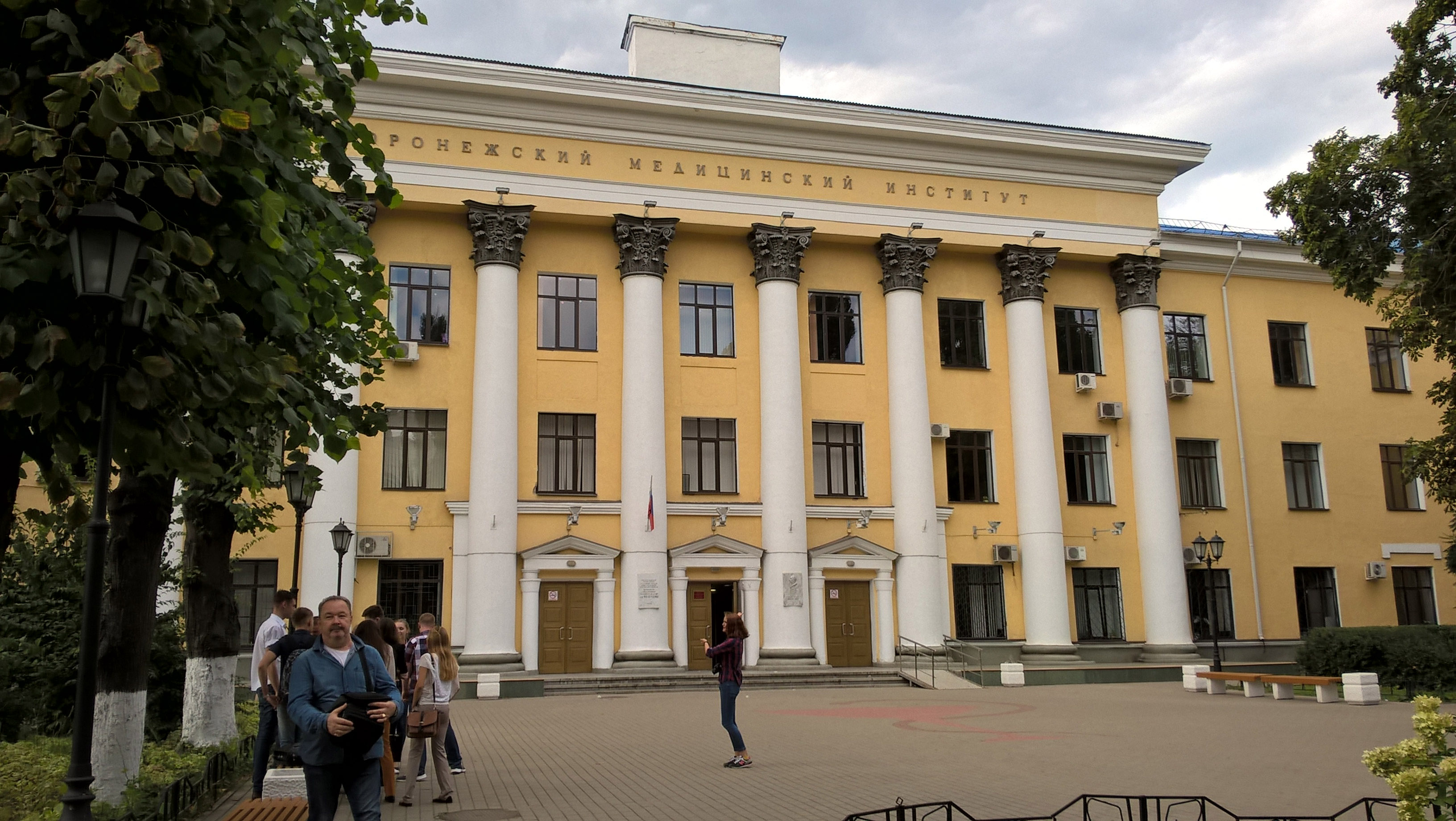
Voronezh State Medical University

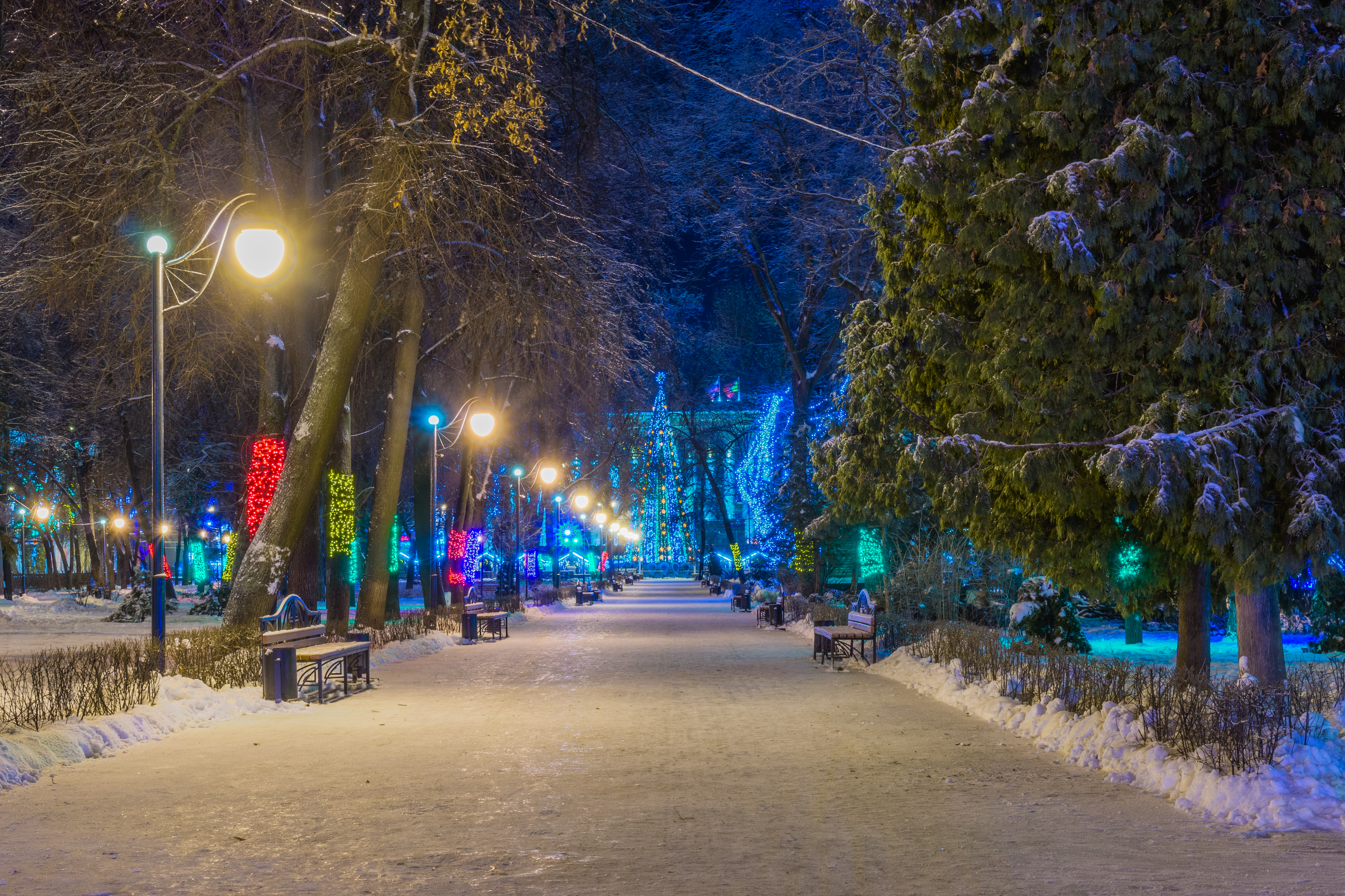
Snow at night in a Voronezh park

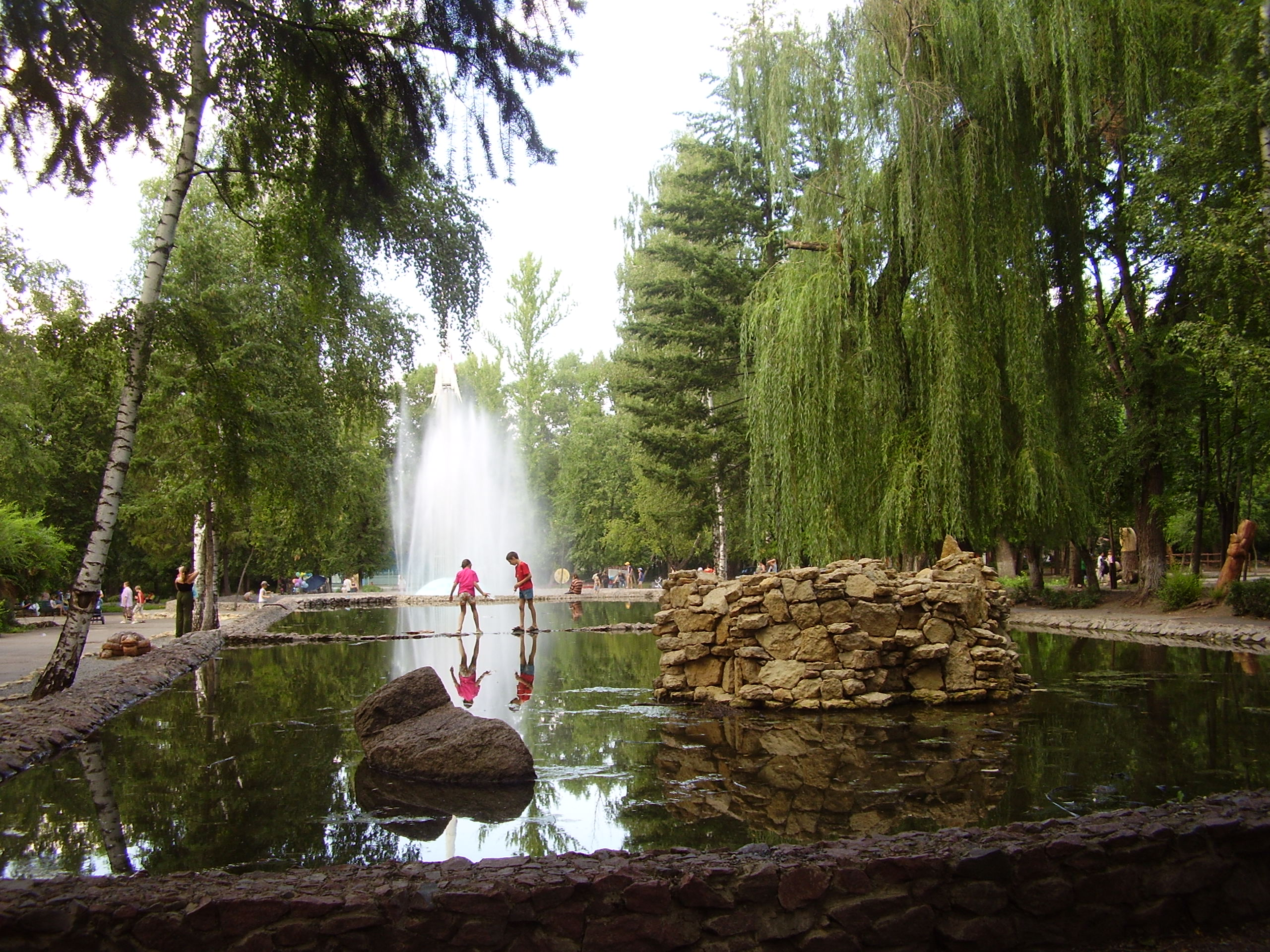
Aviastroiteley Park

The city has seven theaters, twelve museums, a number of movie theaters, a philharmonic hall, and a circus. It is also a major center of higher education in central Russia. The main educational facilities include:

- Voronezh State University
- Voronezh State Technical University
- Voronezh State University of Architecture and Construction
- Voronezh State Pedagogical University
- Voronezh State Agricultural University
- Voronezh State University of Engineering Technologies
- Voronezh State Medical University named after N. N. Burdenko
- Voronezh State Academy of Arts
- Voronezh State University of Forestry and Technologies named after G.F. Morozov
- Voronezh State Institute of Physical Training
- Voronezh Institute of Russia's Home Affairs Ministry
- Voronezh Institute of High Technologies
- Military Educational and Scientific Center of the Air Force «N.E. Zhukovsky and Y.A. Gagarin Air Force Academy» (Voronezh)
- Plekhanov Russian University of Economics (Voronezh branch)
- Russian State University of Justice
- Admiral Makarov State University of Sea and River Fleet (Voronezh branch)
- International Institute of Computer Technologies
- Voronezh Institute of Economics and Law

and a number of other affiliate and private-funded institutes and universities. There are 2000 schools within the city.

=== Theaters ===
- Voronezh Chamber Theatre
- Koltsov Academic Drama Theater
- Voronezh State Opera and Ballet Theatre
- Shut Puppet Theater

=== Festivals ===
Platonov International Arts Festival

== Sports ==
Club	Sport	Founded	Current league	League Rank	Stadium
Fakel Voronezh	Football	1947	Russian Premier League	1st	Tsentralnyi Profsoyuz Stadion
Energy Voronezh	Football	1989	Women's Premier League	1st	Rudgormash Stadium
Buran Voronezh	Ice Hockey	1977	Higher Hockey League	2nd	Yubileyny Sports Palace
VC Voronezh	Volleyball	2006	Women's Higher Volleyball League A	2nd	Kristall Sports Complex

== Religion ==
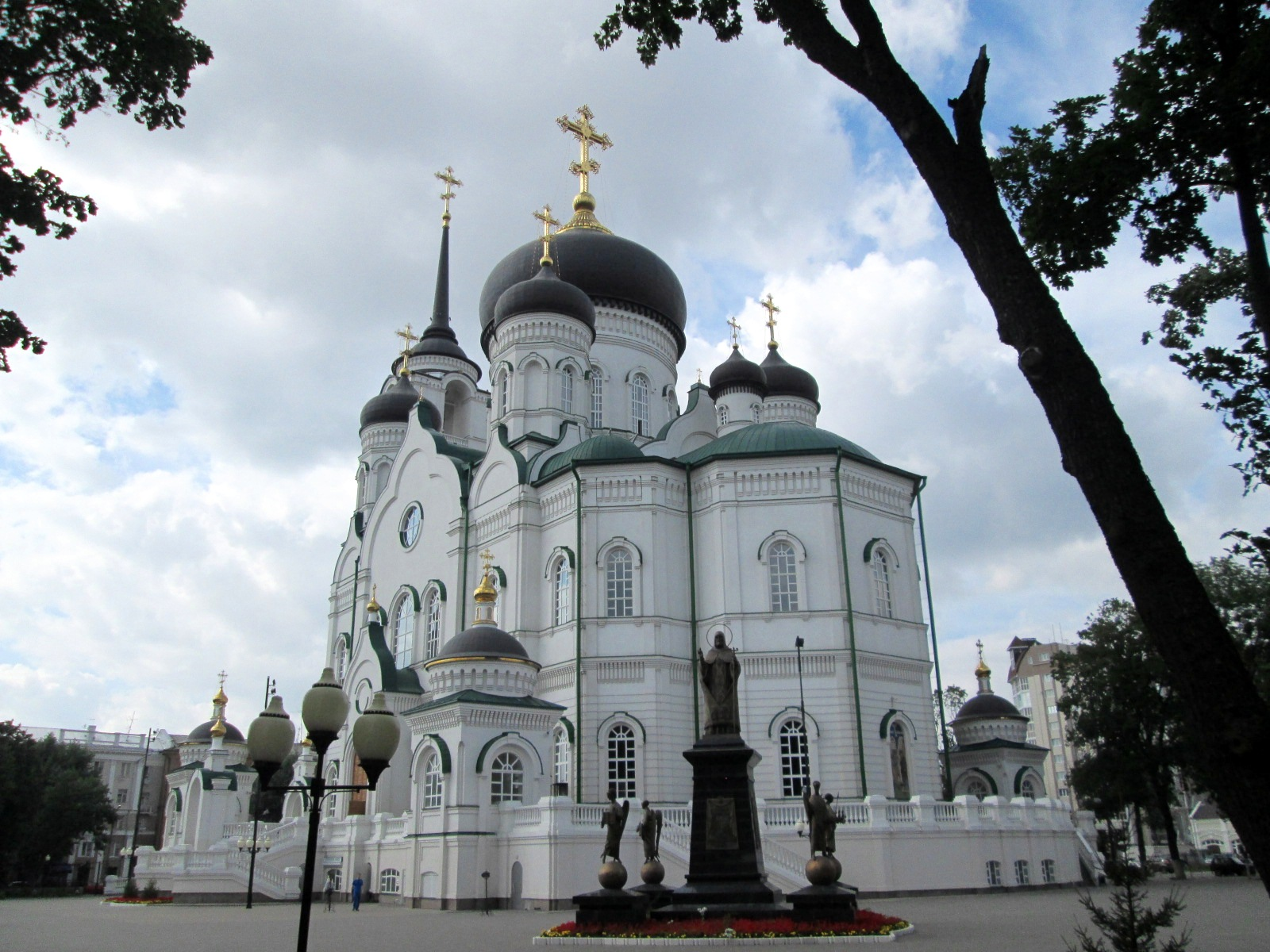
Annunciation Orthodox Cathedral in Voronezh

Orthodox Christianity is the predominant religion in Voronezh. There is an Orthodox Jewish community in Voronezh, with a synagogue located on Stankevicha Street. A notable Christian Armenian community, up to 4,000 individuals, is also present.

In 1682, the Voronezh diocese was formed to fight the schismatics. Its first head was Bishop Mitrofan (1623–1703) at the age of 58. Under him, the construction began on the new Annunciation Cathedral to replace the old one. In 1832, Mitrofan was glorified as a saint by the Russian Orthodox Church.

In the 1990s, many Orthodox churches were returned to the diocese. Their restoration was continued. In 2009, instead of the lost one, a new Annunciation Cathedral was built with a monument to St. Mitrofan erected next to it.

== Cemeteries ==
There are ten cemeteries in Voronezh:

- Levoberezhnoye Cemetery
- Lesnoye Cemetery
- Jewish Cemetery
- Nikolskoye Cemetery
- Pravoberezhnoye Cemetery
- Budyonnovskoe Cemetery
- Yugo-Zapadnoye Cemetery
- Podgorenskоye Cemetery
- Kominternovskoe Cemetery

Ternovoye Cemetery is а historical site closed to the public.

== Sister cities ==
Date		Sister City
1989	(Germany)	Wesermarsch, Lower Saxony, Germany
1991	(United States)	Charlotte, North Carolina, United States
1992	(China)	Chongqing, China
1995	(Bulgaria)	Sliven, Bulgaria
1996	(Spain)	León, Castile and León, Spain

== See also ==
- Voronezh radar

== Further reading and cultural references ==
- Charlotte Hobson's book, Black Earth City, is an account of life in Voronezh at the time of the fall of the Soviet Union based on her experiences after spending a year in Voronezh as a foreign student in 1991–1992.
- Nadezhda Mandelstam's Hope Against Hope, the first volume of her memoirs concerning her husband, the poet Osip Mandelstam, provides many details about life in Voronezh in the 1930s under Stalinist rule.
- Alan Sillitoe, the English writer, published a collection of poems entitled Love in the Environs of Voronezh and Other Poems in 1968.
- In the song Red Army Blues by the Waterboys, on the album A Pagan Place, there is a line "Took the train to Voronezh, that was as far as it would go."
