= Voronezh (river) =

River in Russia

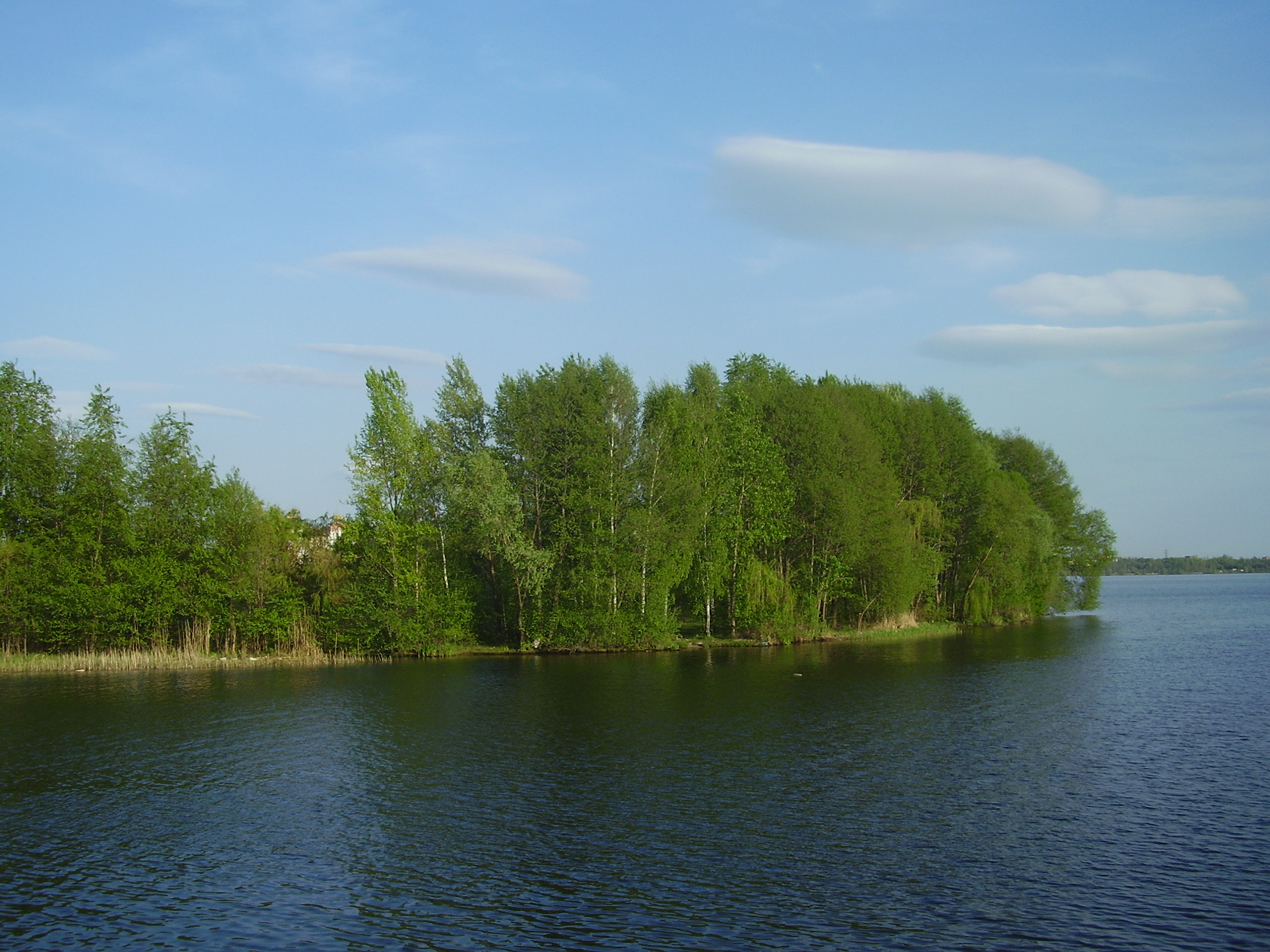
- Native name: Воронеж (Russian)

Location
- Country: Russia

Physical characteristics
- Mouth: Don
  - coordinates: 51°31′36″N 39°05′12″E
- Length: 342 km (213 mi)
- Basin size: 21,600 km^{2} (8,300 sq mi)

Basin features
- Progression: Don→ Sea of Azov
- Tributaries
  - left: Matyra, Usman

The Voronezh (Russian: Воро́неж, pronounced [vɐˈronʲiʂ]), also romanized as Voronež, is a river in Tambov, Lipetsk, and Voronezh oblasts in Russia, a left tributary of the Don. The Voronezh is 342 kilometres (213 mi) long, with a drainage basin of 21,600 square kilometres (8,300 mi^{2}). It freezes up in the first half of December and stays under the ice until late March. The lower reaches of the river are navigable. The cities of Lipetsk and Voronezh are along the Voronezh River.

Going upstream, it leaves the Don south of Voronezh and goes north parallel and east of the Don for about 150 kilometres (93 mi). West of Michurinsk it swings east and splits into the Lesnoy and Polny Voronezh Rivers ("Forest and Field Voronezh"). These go north about 75 kilometres (47 mi) to the border of Ryazan Oblast. To the north are tributaries of the Oka. To the east are the basins of the south-flowing Bityug which joins the Don and the north-flowing Tsna which reaches the Oka via the Moksha.

The river is named for an earlier town destroyed by the Mongol invasion, whose name in turn was borrowed from a place name in the Principality of Chernigov, derived from the personal name Voroneg. From the 1650s the Belgorod Line of forts ran along the Voronezh. In 1706 Peter the Great built boats along the Voronezh and sailed them down the Don to attack the Turkish fortress of Azov.
