= Ozyorny (inhabited locality) =

Ozyorny/Ozerny (Russian: Озёрный/Озерный; masculine), Ozyornaya/Ozernaya (Озёрная/Озерная; feminine), or Ozyornoye/Ozernoye (Озёрное/Озерное; neuter) is the name of several inhabited localities in Russia.

== Altai Krai ==
As of 2010, three rural localities in Altai Krai bear this name:

- Ozerny, Altai Krai, a settlement in Komsomolsky Selsoviet of Pavlovsky District
- Ozernoye, Kulundinsky District, Altai Krai, a selo in Semenovsky Selsoviet of Kulundinsky District
- Ozernoye, Zarinsky District, Altai Krai, a selo in Starodracheninsky Selsoviet of Zarinsky District

== Altai Republic ==
As of 2010, three rural localities in the Altai Republic bear this name:

- Ozyornoye, Mayminsky District, Altai Republic, a selo in Manzherokskoye Rural Settlement of Mayminsky District
- Ozernoye, Ongudaysky District, Altai Republic, a selo in Tenginskoye Rural Settlement of Ongudaysky District
- Ozernoye, Ust-Kansky District, Altai Republic, a selo in Kozulskoye Rural Settlement of Ust-Kansky District

== Amur Oblast ==
As of 2010, one rural locality in Amur Oblast bears this name:

- Ozyornoye, Amur Oblast, a selo in Ozernensky Rural Settlement of Seryshevsky District

== Astrakhan Oblast ==
As of 2010, one rural locality in Astrakhan Oblast bears this name:

- Ozernoye, Astrakhan Oblast, a selo in Ozernovsky Selsoviet of Ikryaninsky District

== Republic of Bashkortostan ==
As of 2010, two rural localities in the Republic of Bashkortostan bear this name:

- Ozyorny, Republic of Bashkortostan, a selo in Mindyaksky Selsoviet of Uchalinsky District
- Ozernoye, Republic of Bashkortostan, a village in Krasnobashkirsky Selsoviet of Abzelilovsky District

== Belgorod Oblast ==
As of 2010, one rural locality in Belgorod Oblast bears this name:

- Ozerny, Belgorod Oblast, a khutor under the administrative jurisdiction of Rovensky Settlement Okrug of Rovensky District

== Bryansk Oblast ==
As of 2010, three rural localities in Bryansk Oblast bear this name:

- Ozerny, Pogarsky District, Bryansk Oblast, a settlement in Kistersky Selsoviet of Pogarsky District
- Ozyorny, Unechsky District, Bryansk Oblast, a settlement in Rassukhsky Selsoviet of Unechsky District
- Ozyornoye, Bryansk Oblast, a village in Novomlynsky Selsoviet of Starodubsky District

== Republic of Buryatia ==
As of 2010, one rural locality in the Republic of Buryatia bears this name:

- Ozerny, Republic of Buryatia, a settlement in Ozerny Selsoviet of Yeravninsky District

== Chelyabinsk Oblast ==
As of 2010, three rural localities in Chelyabinsk Oblast bear this name:

- Ozerny, Agapovsky District, Chelyabinsk Oblast, a settlement in Buranny Selsoviet of Agapovsky District
- Ozerny, Kartalinsky District, Chelyabinsk Oblast, a settlement in Poltavsky Selsoviet of Kartalinsky District
- Ozerny, Krasnoarmeysky District, Chelyabinsk Oblast, a settlement in Petrovsky Selsoviet of Krasnoarmeysky District

== Irkutsk Oblast ==
As of 2010, two rural localities in Irkutsk Oblast bear this name:

- Ozerny, Bratsky District, Irkutsk Oblast, a settlement in Bratsky District
- Ozerny, Usolsky District, Irkutsk Oblast, a settlement in Usolsky District

== Ivanovo Oblast ==
As of 2010, one rural locality in Ivanovo Oblast bears this name:

- Ozerny, Ivanovo Oblast, a selo in Ivanovsky District

== Jewish Autonomous Oblast ==
As of 2010, one rural locality in the Jewish Autonomous Oblast bears this name:

- Ozyornoye, Jewish Autonomous Oblast, a selo in Oktyabrsky District

== Kaliningrad Oblast ==
As of 2010, two rural localities in Kaliningrad Oblast bear this name:

- Ozernoye, Chernyakhovsky District, Kaliningrad Oblast, a settlement in Kaluzhsky Rural Okrug of Chernyakhovsky District
- Ozernoye, Gvardeysky District, Kaliningrad Oblast, a settlement in Ozerkovsky Rural Okrug of Gvardeysky District

== Republic of Kalmykia ==
As of 2010, one rural locality in the Republic of Kalmykia bears this name:

- Ozerny, Republic of Kalmykia, a settlement in Komsomolskaya Rural Administration of Chernozemelsky District

== Kaluga Oblast ==
As of 2010, one rural locality in Kaluga Oblast bears this name:

- Ozernoye, Kaluga Oblast, a village in Medynsky District

== Komi Republic ==
As of 2010, one rural locality in the Komi Republic bears this name:

- Ozerny, Komi Republic, a settlement in Ozerny Rural-type Settlement Administrative Territory of Pechora

== Kostroma Oblast ==
As of 2010, one rural locality in Kostroma Oblast bears this name:

- Ozernaya, Kostroma Oblast, a village in Pyshchugskoye Settlement of Pyshchugsky District

== Krasnodar Krai ==
As of 2010, one rural locality in Krasnodar Krai bears this name:

- Ozerny, Krasnodar Krai, a settlement in imeni M. Gorkogo Rural Okrug of Kavkazsky District

== Krasnoyarsk Krai ==
As of 2010, two rural localities in Krasnoyarsk Krai bear this name:

- Ozerny, Krasnoyarsk Krai, a settlement in Pochetsky Selsoviet of Abansky District
- Ozernoye, Krasnoyarsk Krai, a selo in Ozernovsky Selsoviet of Yeniseysky District

== Kurgan Oblast ==
As of 2010, three rural localities in Kurgan Oblast bear this name:

- Ozernoye, Almenevsky District, Kurgan Oblast, a village in Yulamanovsky Selsoviet of Almenevsky District
- Ozernoye, Zverinogolovsky District, Kurgan Oblast, a selo in Ozerninsky Selsoviet of Zverinogolovsky District
- Ozernaya, Kurgan Oblast, a village in Kamyshinsky Selsoviet of Safakulevsky District

== Mari El Republic ==
As of 2010, one rural locality in the Mari El Republic bears this name:

- Ozerny, Mari El Republic, a settlement in Krasnomostovsky Rural Okrug of Kilemarsky District

== Republic of Mordovia ==
As of 2010, two rural localities in the Republic of Mordovia bear this name:

- Ozerny, Saransk, Republic of Mordovia, a settlement in Ozerny Selsoviet of the city of republic significance of Saransk
- Ozerny, Zubovo-Polyansky District, Republic of Mordovia, a settlement under the administrative jurisdiction of the work settlement of Yavas, Zubovo-Polyansky District

== Nizhny Novgorod Oblast ==
As of 2010, one rural locality in Nizhny Novgorod Oblast bears this name:

- Ozerny, Nizhny Novgorod Oblast, a settlement under the administrative jurisdiction of the work settlement of Shimorskoye, which is under the administrative jurisdiction of the town of oblast significance of Vyksa

== Novosibirsk Oblast ==
As of 2010, four rural localities in Novosibirsk Oblast bear this name:

- Ozerny, Chistoozyorny District, Novosibirsk Oblast, a settlement in Chistoozyorny District
- Ozerny, Kuybyshevsky District, Novosibirsk Oblast, a settlement in Kuybyshevsky District
- Ozerny, Novosibirsky District, Novosibirsk Oblast, a settlement in Novosibirsky District
- Ozernoye, Novosibirsk Oblast, a village in Ust-Tarksky District

== Omsk Oblast ==
As of 2010, two rural localities in Omsk Oblast bear this name:

- Ozernoye, Nizhneomsky District, Omsk Oblast, a village in Khortitsky Rural Okrug of Nizhneomsky District
- Ozernoye, Russko-Polyansky District, Omsk Oblast, a village in Alabotinsky Rural Okrug of Russko-Polyansky District

== Orenburg Oblast ==
As of 2010, two rural localities in Orenburg Oblast bear this name:

- Ozerny, Orenburg Oblast, a settlement in Ozerny Selsoviet of Svetlinsky District
- Ozernoye, Orenburg Oblast, a selo in Pylayevsky Selsoviet of Pervomaysky District

== Oryol Oblast ==
As of 2010, one rural locality in Oryol Oblast bears this name:

- Ozernoye, Oryol Oblast, a village in Mokhovskoy Selsoviet of Pokrovsky District

== Primorsky Krai ==
As of 2010, one rural locality in Primorsky Krai bears this name:

- Ozernoye, Primorsky Krai, a selo in Yakovlevsky District

== Pskov Oblast ==
As of 2010, one rural locality in Pskov Oblast bears this name:

- Ozernaya, Pskov Oblast, a village in Pustoshkinsky District

== Rostov Oblast ==
As of 2010, one rural locality in Rostov Oblast bears this name:

- Ozerny, Rostov Oblast, a settlement in Voznesenskoye Rural Settlement of Morozovsky District

== Ryazan Oblast ==
As of 2010, one rural locality in Ryazan Oblast bears this name:

- Ozerny, Ryazan Oblast, a settlement in Bulgakovsky Rural Okrug of Kasimovsky District

== Saratov Oblast ==
As of 2010, two rural localities in Saratov Oblast bear this name:

- Ozyorny, Saratov Oblast, a settlement in Dergachyovsky District
- Ozyornoye, Saratov Oblast, a selo in Atkarsky District

== Smolensk Oblast ==
As of 2010, two inhabited localities in Smolensk Oblast bear this name:

- Ozyorny, Smolensk Oblast, a settlement under the administrative jurisdiction of Ozyornenskoye Urban Settlement of Dukhovshchinsky District
- Ozyornaya, Smolensk Oblast, a village in Ozyornoye Rural Settlement of Shumyachsky District

== Stavropol Krai ==
As of 2010, two rural localities in Stavropol Krai bear this name:

- Ozyorny, Stavropol Krai, a settlement in Temizhbeksky Selsoviet of Novoalexandrovsky District
- Ozyornoye, Stavropol Krai, a selo in Verkhnestepnovsky Selsoviet of Stepnovsky District

== Sverdlovsk Oblast ==
As of 2010, two rural localities in Sverdlovsk Oblast bear this name:

- Ozyorny, Beloyarsky District, Sverdlovsk Oblast, a settlement in Beloyarsky District
- Ozyorny, Rezhevskoy District, Sverdlovsk Oblast, a settlement in Rezhevsky District

== Tambov Oblast ==
As of 2010, one rural locality in Tambov Oblast bears this name:

- Ozyorny, Tambov Oblast, a settlement in Nashchekinsky Selsoviet of Bondarsky District

== Republic of Tatarstan ==
As of 2010, one rural locality in the Republic of Tatarstan bears this name:

- Ozyorny, Republic of Tatarstan, a settlement in Vysokogorsky District

== Tomsk Oblast ==
As of 2010, two rural localities in Tomsk Oblast bear this name:

- Ozyornoye, Kolpashevsky District, Tomsk Oblast, a selo in Kolpashevsky District
- Ozyornoye, Teguldetsky District, Tomsk Oblast, a village in Teguldetsky District

== Tver Oblast ==
As of 2010, one urban locality in Tver Oblast bears this name:

- Ozyorny, Tver Oblast, an urban-type settlement in Tver Oblast; incorporated as a closed administrative-territorial formation of the same name

== Tyumen Oblast ==
As of 2010, two rural localities in Tyumen Oblast bear this name:

- Ozyornoye, Tyumen Oblast, a selo in Ozyorninsky Rural Okrug of Vikulovsky District
- Ozyornaya, Tyumen Oblast, a village in Aslaninsky Rural Okrug of Yalutorovsky District

== Vladimir Oblast ==
As of 2010, one rural locality in Vladimir Oblast bears this name:

- Ozyorny, Vladimir Oblast, a selo in Yuryev-Polsky District

== Vologda Oblast ==
As of 2010, one rural locality in Vologda Oblast bears this name:

- Ozyorny, Vologda Oblast, a settlement in Mishutinsky Selsoviet of Vozhegodsky District

== Voronezh Oblast ==
As of 2010, one rural locality in Voronezh Oblast bears this name:

- Ozyorny, Voronezh Oblast, a settlement under the administrative jurisdiction of Novokhopyorsk Urban Settlement of Novokhopyorsky District

== Zabaykalsky Krai ==
As of 2010, one rural locality in Zabaykalsky Krai bears this name:

- Ozyornaya, Zabaykalsky Krai, a selo in Chernyshevsky District
