= Lake Manzherok =

Lake in Russia

- Манјӱрек
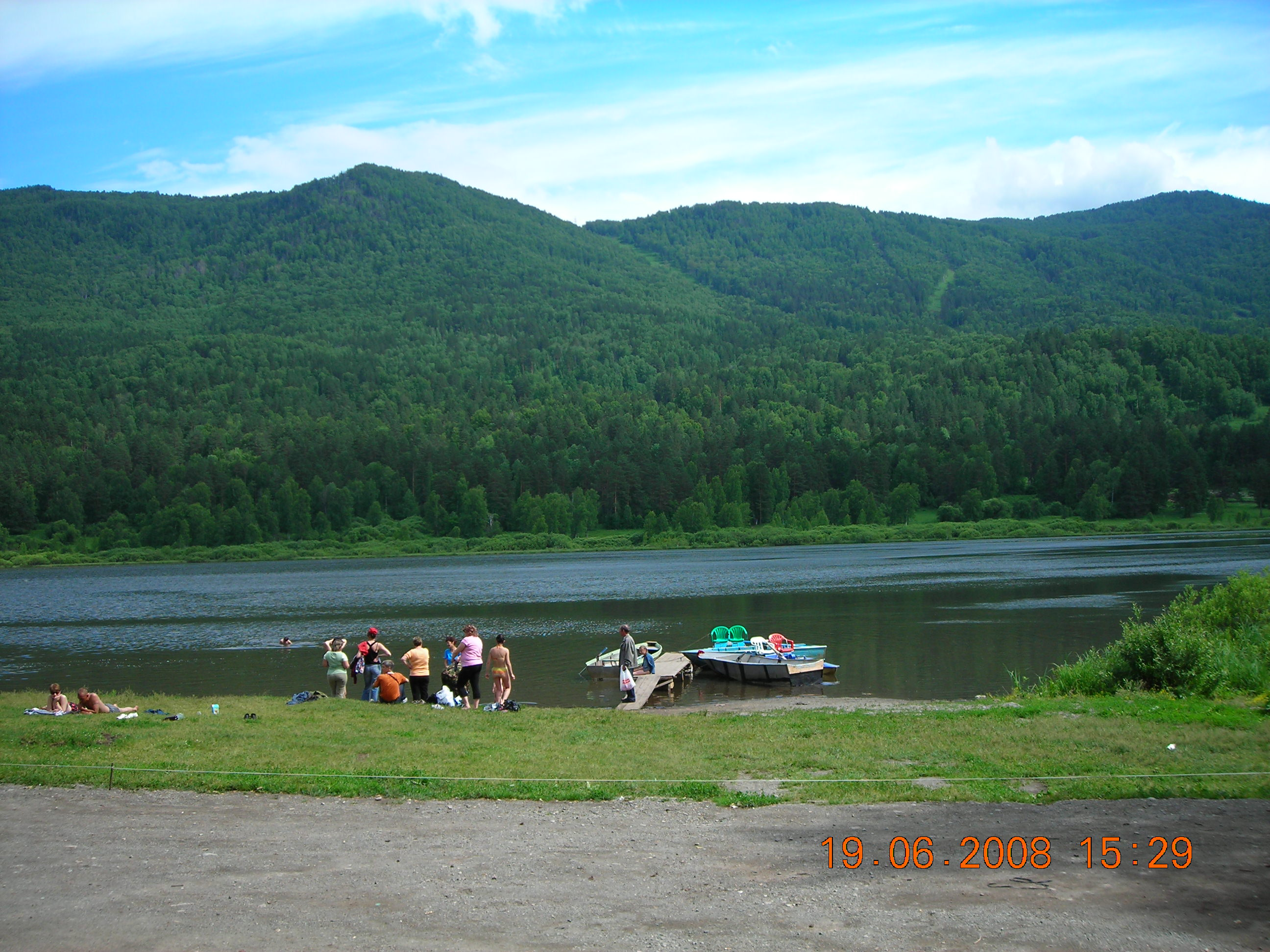
- Lake Manzherok

- Location: Altai Republic, Russia
- Coordinates: 51°49′17″N 85°48′40″E
- Max. length: 1.1 km (0.68 mi)
- Max. width: 0.4 km (0.25 mi)
- Surface area: 0.37 km^{2} (0.14 sq mi)

Lake Manzherok (Manzherok, Altay: Manјӱrek, Manĵürek) is a lake in the Altai Republic, located on the right bank of the Katun, at an altitude of 373 m above sea level. The Altai name of the lake is Doingol. The length of the lake is 1112 m, the maximum width is 400 m, the depth is 2.5-2.8 m, and the area is 37.6 ha. The village of the same name is located 2 km from the lake, on the banks of the Katun River. Near the lake is the village of Ozernoye. The lake is a natural monument.

The lake is fed by streams, atmospheric precipitation and groundwater. The water is fresh and soft. The water has a dirty green color, low transparency (60–180 cm), temperature - 22 °C in summer. According to chemical analysis, the lake belongs to the chloride-carbonate type. The bottom of the lake is composed of dark gray lake silt.

The lake can be called the oxbow of Katun.

In summer, the lake warms up. In 1966, the Soviet-Mongolian Friendship Festival was held on the lake. The lake is a popular tourist destination. Many camp sites organize excursions here. Since 2008, a ski resort has been built near Lake Manzherok.

== Flora and fauna ==
Many species of birds nest around the lake, some of them are listed in the Red List. A few years ago, crucian carp, tench, perch, carp and northern pike were found in the lake, fishing was possible all year round. In recent years, fishing in Manzherok has been problematic, probably due to a drain that was carried out to clean the lake. The lake stands out among other reservoirs of the Altai Mountains with a large variety of aquatic plants, 25 species in total. These are:

1. Endemic — water caltrop, listed in the Red List, (on the verge of destruction);
2. Potamogetonaceae;
3. In July, in the middle of the lake you can see a lot of blooming Nymphaea (also on the verge of destruction).

The vegetation of the eastern and southeastern slopes is diverse: pine, spruce, fir, birch, honeysuckle, blackcurrant, crataegus, rhododendron, buckthorn, etc. The northeastern and southwestern shores are low and very swampy. Of the entire length of the coastline, only 500 m is a solid coast.

== In culture ==
- The song "Manzherok" by Oscar Feltsman to the lyrics by Naum Olev, performed by Edita Piekha, became a hit, despite the fact that it was written by special order for the festival of friendship between the Mongolian-Soviet youth in 1966.
- The film "There Is Such a Lad": at the thirty-second minute, the characters drive through the village of Manzherok on a truck.

== Bibliography ==
- Акимова, T. A.; Злобина, Т. И.; Полунина, О. Е. (2008). Достопримечательности Горного Алтая (in Russian). Барнаул: Пять плюс. pp. 96–232. ISBN 978-5-9900731-8-0.
- Безматерных, Д. М.; Кириллов, В. В.; Балыкин, С. Н.; Ковешников, М. И.; Дьяченко, А. В.; Медникова, Г. М. (2020). "Влияние дноуглубительных работ на морфометрические характеристики, показатели качества воды и донных отложений озера Манжерокское (Республика Алтай)". Научно-практический журнал «Водное хозяйство России: проблемы, технологии, управление» (in Russian) (1): 6–18.
- Безматерных, Д. М.; Кириллов, В. В.; Ермолаева, Н. И.; Киприянова, Л. М.; Яныгина, Л. В.; Митрофанова, Е. Ю.; Вдовина, О. Н.; Котовщиков, А. В.; Зарубина, Е. Ю. (2020). "Влияние дноуглубительных работ на гидробиологические и санитарно-микробиологические характеристики озера Манжерокского (Республика Алтай)". Научно-практический журнал «Водное хозяйство России: проблемы, технологии, управление» (in Russian) (3): 106–127.
- Вдовина, Т. В.; Злобина, Т. И.; Танакова, М. В. (2006). Алтай. Путешествие по Чуйскому тракту (in Russian). Барнаул: Пять плюс. pp. 106–107. ISBN 5-9900731-1-9.
