= Verkhny Saydys =

Verkhny Saydys Верхний Сайдыс
- Settlement
- Location within Altai Republic Location within Russia
- Coordinates: 51°45′N 86°12′E
- Country: Russia
- Region: Altai Republic
- District: Mayminsky District
- Time zone: UTC+7:00

Verkhny Saydys (Russian: Верхний Сайдыс; Altay: Ӱстӱги Сайдыс, Üstügi Saydıs) is a rural locality (a settlement) in Mayminsky District, the Altai Republic, Russia. The population was 3 in 2016.

== Geography ==
Verkhny Saydys is located 47 km southeast of Mayma (the district's administrative centre) by road. Sredny Saydys is the nearest rural locality.
