= Rybalka (rural locality) =

Rybalka Рыбалка
- Settlement
- Location within Altai Republic Location within Russia
- Coordinates: 51°55′N 85°51′E
- Country: Russia
- Region: Altai Republic
- District: Mayminsky District
- Time zone: UTC+7:00

Rybalka (Russian: Рыбалка; Altay: Ай-Балык, Ay-Balık) is a rural locality (a settlement) in Mayminskoye Rural Settlement of Mayminsky District, the Altai Republic, Russia. The population was 62 as of 2016. There are 7 streets.

== Geography ==
Rybalka is located on the Katun River, 13 km south of Mayma (the district's administrative centre) by road. Katun is the nearest rural locality.
