= Karlushka =

Karlushka Карлушка
- Settlement
- Location within Altai Republic Location within Russia
- Coordinates: 51°58′N 85°51′E
- Country: Russia
- Region: Altai Republic
- District: Mayminsky District
- Time zone: UTC+7:00

Karlushka (Russian: Карлушка; Altay: Карлу, Karlu) is a rural locality (a settlement) in Mayminskoye Rural Settlement of Mayminsky District, the Altai Republic, Russia. The population was 442 as of 2016. There are 4 streets.

== Geography ==
Karlushka is located on the Katun River, 4 km southwest of Mayma (the district's administrative centre) by road. Mayma is the nearest rural locality.
