= Ust-Muny =

Ust-Muny Усть-Муны
- Village
- Location within Altai Republic Location within Russia
- Coordinates: 51°43′N 85°45′E
- Country: Russia
- Region: Altai Republic
- District: Mayminsky District
- Time zone: UTC+7:00

Ust-Muny (Russian: Усть-Муны; Altay: Ыны, Inı) is a rural locality (a selo) and the administrative centre of Ust-Munynskoye Rural Settlement of Mayminsky District, the Altai Republic, Russia. The population was 445 as of 2016. There are 19 streets.

== Geography ==
Ust-Muny is located on the Katun River, 47 km south of Mayma (the district's administrative centre) by road. Barangol is the nearest rural locality.
