= Tuyekta =

Tuyekta Туекта
- Village
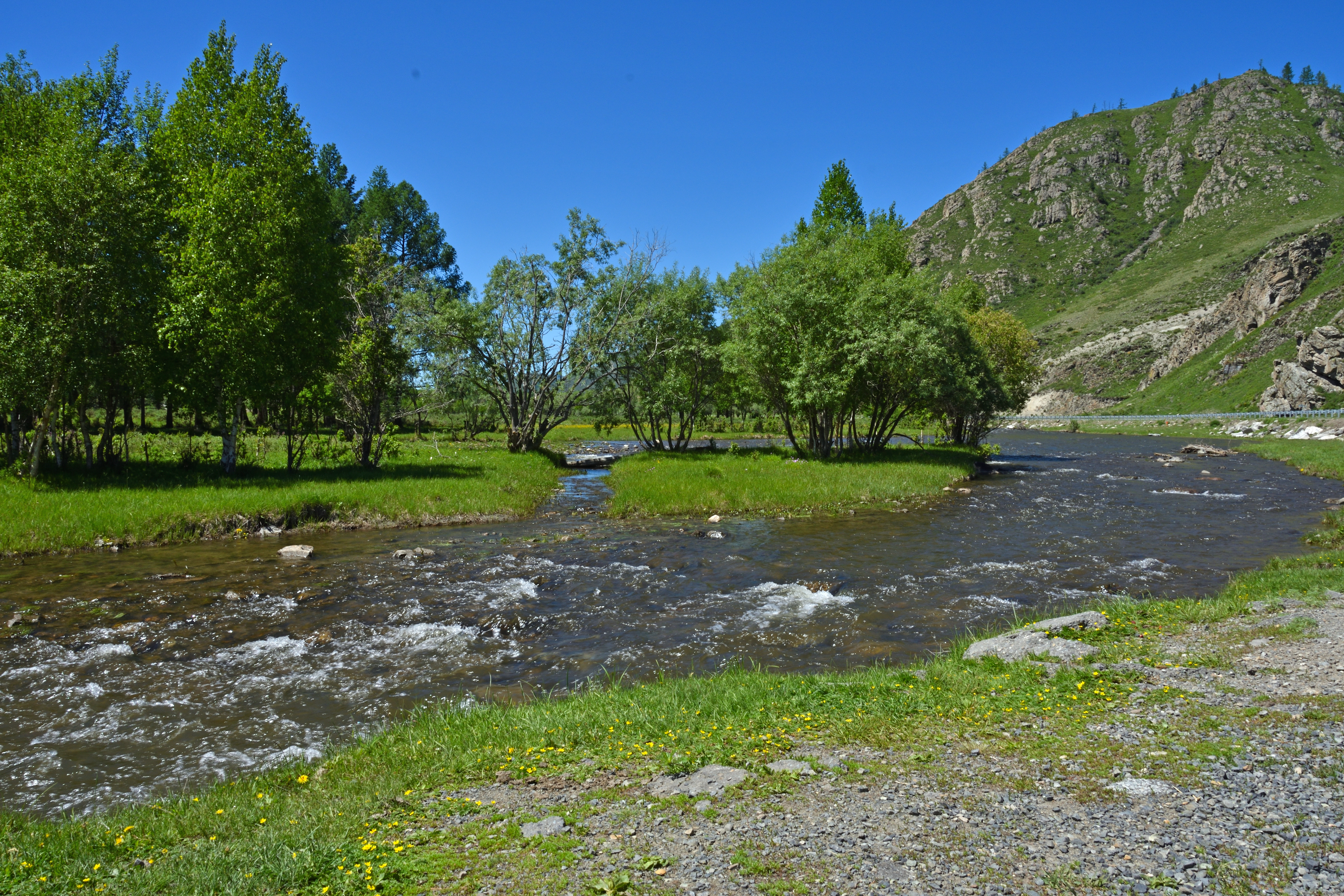
- Ursul river in Tuyekta

- Location within Altai Republic Location within Russia
- Coordinates: 50°50′N 85°52′E
- Country: Russia
- Region: Altai Republic
- District: Ongudaysky District
- Time zone: UTC+7:00

Tuyekta (Russian: Туекта; Altay: Туйакты, romanized: Tuyaqtı) is a rural locality (a selo) in Tenginskoye Rural Settlement of Ongudaysky District, the Altai Republic, Russia. The population was 329 as of 2016. There are 3 streets.

== Geography ==
Tuyekta is located on the bank of the Ursul River, 22 km northwest of Onguday (the district's administrative centre) by road. Karakol is the nearest rural locality.
