= Yelo, Russia =

Yelo Ело
- Village
- Location within Altai Republic Location within Russia
- Coordinates: 50°46′N 85°33′E
- Country: Russia
- Region: Altai Republic
- District: Ongudaysky District
- Time zone: UTC+7:00

Yelo (Russian: Ело; Altay: Joло, Ĵolo) is a rural locality (a selo) and the administrative centre of Yelinskoye Rural Settlement of Ongudaysky District, the Altai Republic, Russia. The population was 800 as of 2016. There are 12 streets.

== Geography ==
It is located in the intermontane basin between the Seminsky and Terektinsky ridges, on the right bank of the Ursul River, at the mouth of the Karylyk river, 52 km west of Onguday (the district's administrative centre) by road. Kara Koby is the nearest rural locality.

== Notable person ==
Amadu Mamadakov (born 1976), actor
