= Alfyorovo =

Alfyorovo Алфёрово
- Village
- Location within Altai Republic Location within Russia
- Coordinates: 51°58′N 86°00′E
- Country: Russia
- Region: Altai Republic
- District: Mayminsky District
- Time zone: UTC+7:00

Alfyorovo (Russian: Алфёрово; Altay: Боочы-Арка, Booçı-Arka) is a rural locality (a selo) in Kyzyl-Ozyokskoye Rural Settlement of Mayminsky District, the Altai Republic, Russia. The population was 1467 as of 2016. There are 33 streets.

== Geography ==
Alfyorovo is located on the right bank of the river Ulalushki, northeast of the city of Gorno-Altaisk, with which the village is connected by regular bus and automobile lighting, 13 km southeast of Mayma (the district's administrative centre) by road. Gorno-Altaisk is the nearest rural locality.
