= Soviet-Mongolian Friendship Festival =

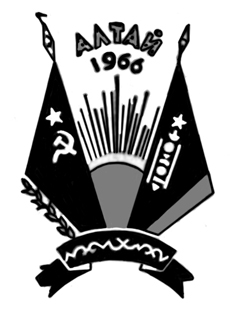
- The emblem of the Soviet-Mongolian Friendship Festival, 1966
- Dates: 17 August 1966 - 25 August 1966
- Locations: Altai Republic, Altai Krai, Russia

The Soviet-Mongolian Friendship Festival was held from 17 August to 25 August 1966 in Altai Republic and Altai Krai, Russia.

The festival was attended by delegations from Ulaanbaatar and USSR. The participants of the festival met in a small village of the Altai Autonomous Region - Manzherok. The Mongolian delegation was headed by the secretary of the Mongolian Revolutionary Youth League - Bata. The festival program included performances by famous artists and singers, sports competitions, a series of seminars dedicated to the education of young people, as well as rally in support of Vietnam.

== Program of the Festival ==
On the first day of the festival, the grand opening and acquaintance of the delegations took place in the festival town, organized on the basis of the pioneer camp named after Vladimir Lenin, near Lake Manzherok. A group of young people from Sevastopol handed to Bata a piece of granite from the famous Malakhov Kurgan, a leaf from a tree planted on it by the first secretary of the MPP Tsedenbal during his stay in the USSR, and a handful of earth from the Mount Sapun. At five o'clock in the evening, the delegations lined up on the sports field. The festival was opened by the first secretary of the Altai Regional Komsomol Committee V. Kiryushov. On this day, the song "Manzherok" was performed for the first time. The lyrics were written by Naum Olev, the music was composed by Oscar Feltsman.

The second day of the festival began with a seminar on "Educating young people on the revolutionary, combat and labor traditions of the party and the people." The reports of the Secretary of the Mongolian Revolutionary Youth League Bata and the first secretary of Kemerov Komsomol Committee Boris Roghatin on the tasks of youth unions were listened. Sports competitions were also held on this day. In the evening, the festival participants met with the secretaries of Komsomol organizations, schools and colleges in tourist camp "Youth".

On the third day, seminars and sports competitions in volleyball and tennis were held.

On the fourth day, the competitions between the teams of the USSR and Mongolia continued, and the head of the Mongolian delegation, Bata, was interviewed.

The fifth day of the festival was held in Gorno-Altaysk. The guests were welcomed by Fyodor Kazantsev, who has devoted more than 20 years to gardening. The director of the base, Yuri Brown, briefly introduces people from Mongolia and various cities of the Soviet Union to the history and affairs of the collective. In 1933, the first gardens were laid in the Altai Mountains. In 1966, scientists and plant breeders of the base had many new varieties that were recognized not only in Siberia. In the evening a concert was held on Vladimir Lenin Square.

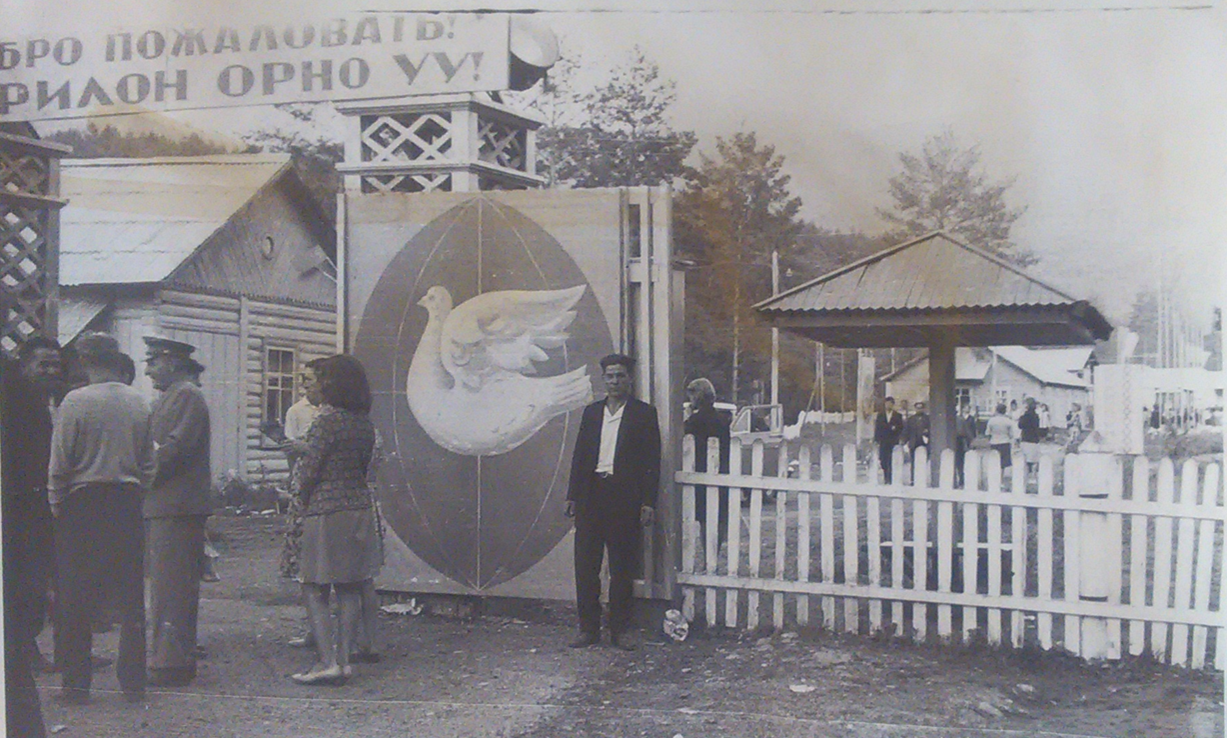
The entrance of the festival town in Manzherok, 1966

On the sixth day of the festival a "holiday on the water" was held. Lake Manzherok hosted demonstrations by scuba divers, kayaking, and water skiing. Several parachutists landed on the water surface. Mongolian writer, the laureate of the State Prize, Ts. Gaitov read his new poems. A meeting of young teachers was held, where various issues of organizing and conducting classes and leisure were discussed. Also, it was the last day of seminars.

The seventh day of the festival was the last one that participants spent in Manzherok. The participants of the festival said goodbye to Manzherok and drove cars from the town to Biysk. A special train was supposed to deliver the Soviet and Mongolian delegations to Barnaul.

On the next and eighth day, the guests spent the whole day getting acquainted with the sights of Barnaul and the collectives of its leading enterprises in those years. Afterwards, they visited the exhibition of achievements of national hospitality.

In the ninth day the festival participants visited the construction site of the Sports Palace where they helped with the cleaning of the territory. Each of them received as a gift a picture with the inscription: "Construction of a closed demonstration rink, mountains. Barnaul, Stroygaz Trust, August 1966". Sports competitions in wrestling, volleyball and table tennis were held. In the evening, festival participants and residents of Barnaul celebrated the closing ceremony of the festival.

== Interesting facts ==
A common misconception is that the song "Manzherok" was performed at the festival by Edita Piekha. Although she made this song famous in the country, actually she did not attend the festival.
