= Kupchegen =

Kupchegen Купчегень
- Village
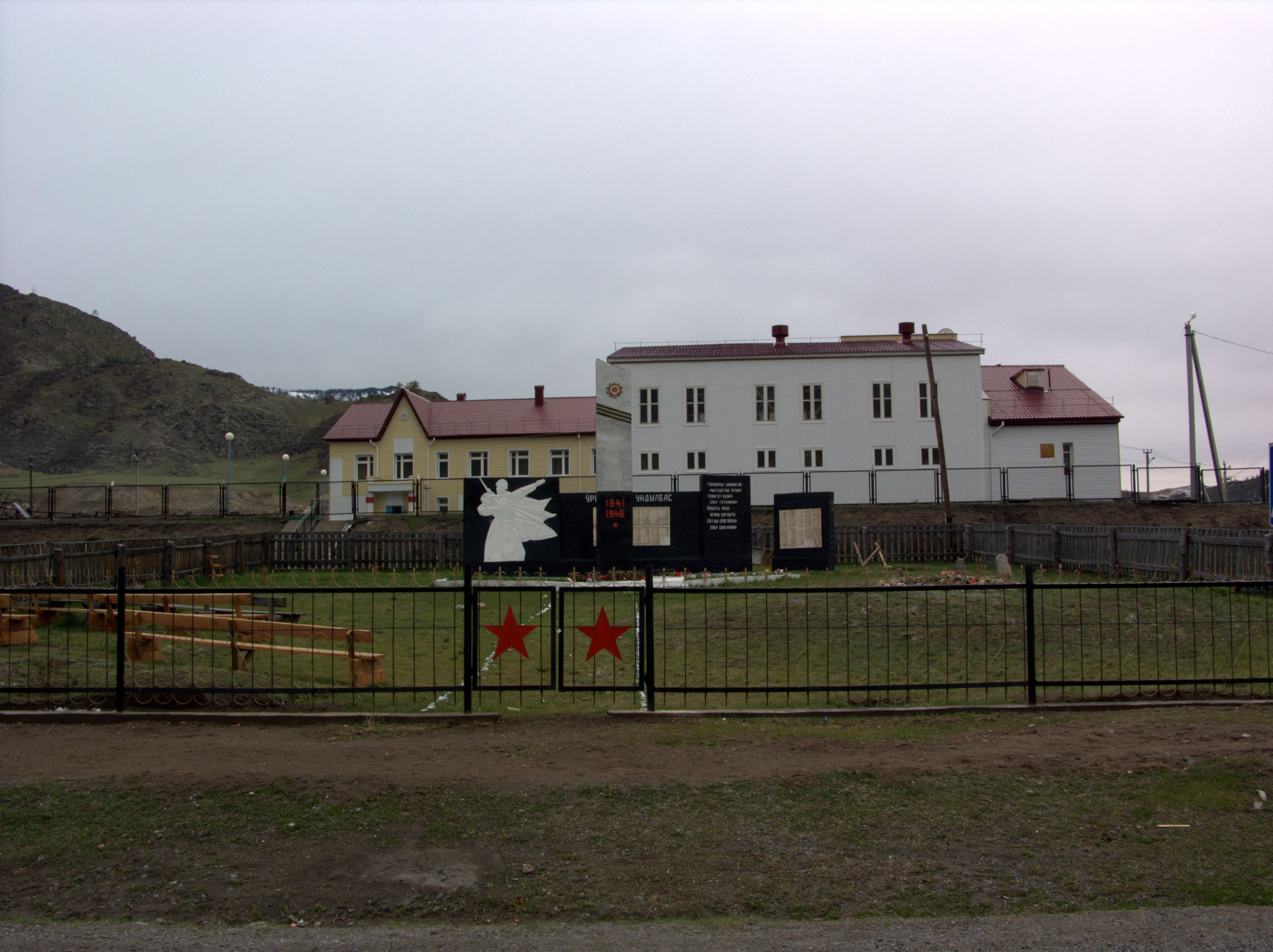

- Location within Altai Republic Location within Russia
- Coordinates: 50°37′N 86°25′E
- Country: Russia
- Region: Altai Republic
- District: Ongudaysky District
- Time zone: UTC+7:00

Kupchegen (Russian: Купчегень; Altay: Кӱпчеген, Küpçegen) is a rural locality (a selo) and the administrative centre of Kupchegenskoye Rural Settlement of Ongudaysky District, the Altai Republic, Russia. The population was 551 as of 2016. There are 9 streets.

== Geography ==
Kupchegen is located in the mountain valley of the Ulegem Ridge at the mouth of the Kupchegen River, 38 km southeast of Onguday (the district's administrative centre) by road. Khabarovka is the nearest rural locality.
