= Chibitka =

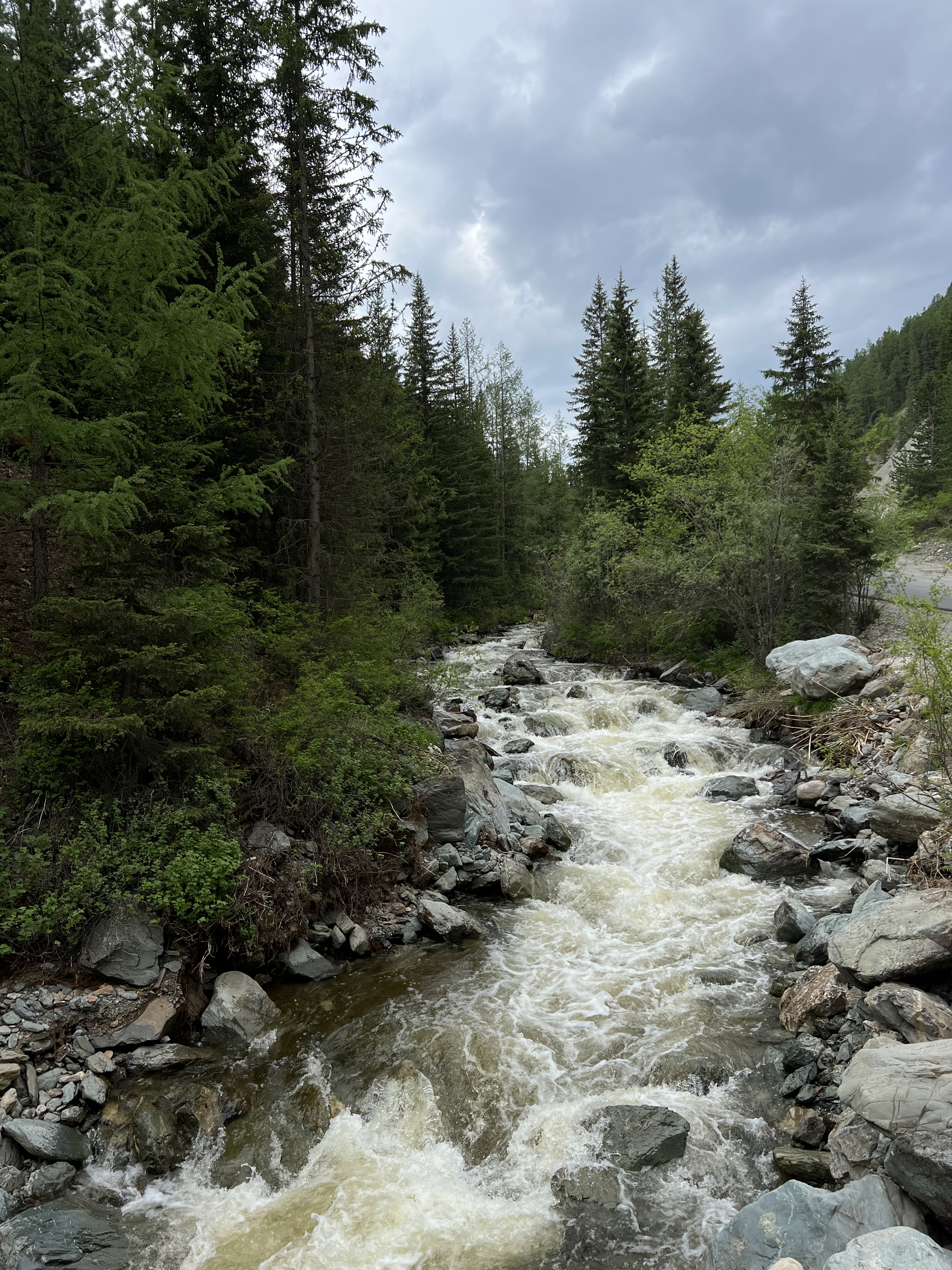

Location
- Country: Russia

Physical characteristics
- Source
  - location: Kurai Range
- Mouth: Chuya
  - coordinates: 50.3186°N 87.4983°E
- Length: 39 km (24 mi)

Basin features
- Progression: Chuya→ Katun→ Ob→ Kara Sea

The Chibitka (Russian: Чибитка, Altay: Чибит суу, Çibit suu, literally: "Yellow river") is in the Altai Republic, Russia. It is a right tributary of the Chuya. It is 39 kilometres (24 mi) long. It flows into the Chuya in the village Chibit.

In the Chibitka basin there are more than 20 lakes such as Lake Uzun-Kol and Cheybek-Kohl on the eastern slope of the Kurai Range. Thereafter, the right tributary flows into the Chibitka, which includes Lake Uzun-Kol in its upper reaches.
