= Barangol =

Barangol Барангол
- Settlement
- Location within Altai Republic Location within Russia
- Coordinates: 51°40′N 85°46′E
- Country: Russia
- Region: Altai Republic
- District: Mayminsky District
- Time zone: UTC+7:00

Barangol (Russian: Барангол; Altay: Бараан-Коол, Baraan-Kool) is a rural locality (a selo) in Ust-Muninskoye Rural Settlement of Mayminsky District, the Altai Republic, Russia. The population was 115 as of 2016. There are 5 streets.

== Geography ==
Barangol is located on the Katun River, 52 km south of Mayma (the district's administrative centre) by road. Verkh Barangol is the nearest rural locality.
