= Boochi =

Boochi Боочи
- Selo
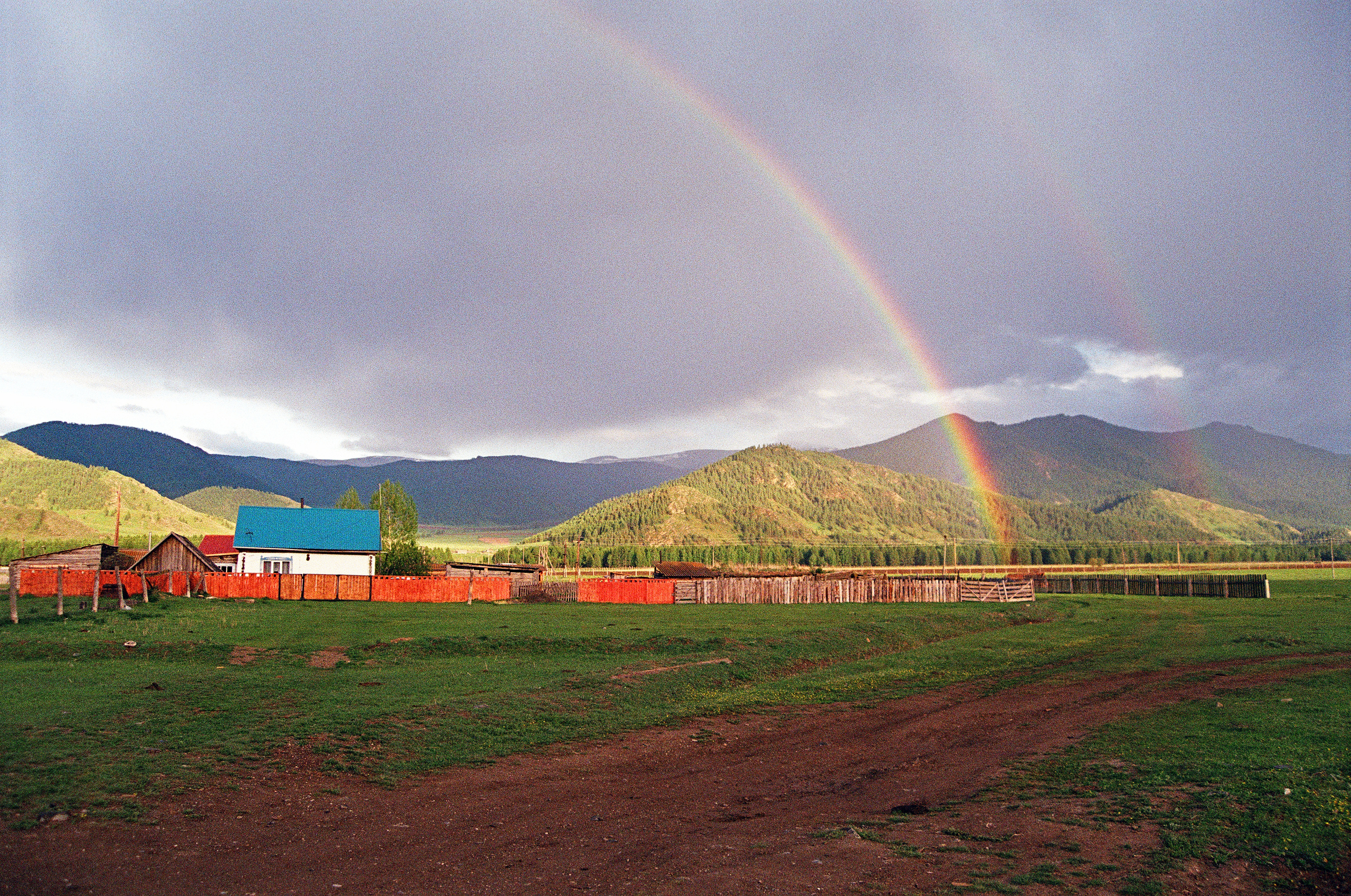
- The village with a rainbow

- Location within Altai Republic Location within Russia
- Coordinates: 50°44′N 85°49′E
- Country: Russia
- Region: Altai Republic
- District: Ongudaysky District
- Time zone: UTC+7:00

Boochi (Russian: Боочи; Altai: Боочы, Booçı) is a rural locality (a selo) in Ongudaysky District, the Altai Republic, Russia. The population was 262 as of 2016. There are 6 streets.

== Geography ==
Boochi is located 29 km west of Onguday (the district's administrative centre) by road. Kulada and Bichiktu-Boom are the nearest rural localities.
