= Malaya Inya =

Malaya Inya Малая Иня
- Selo
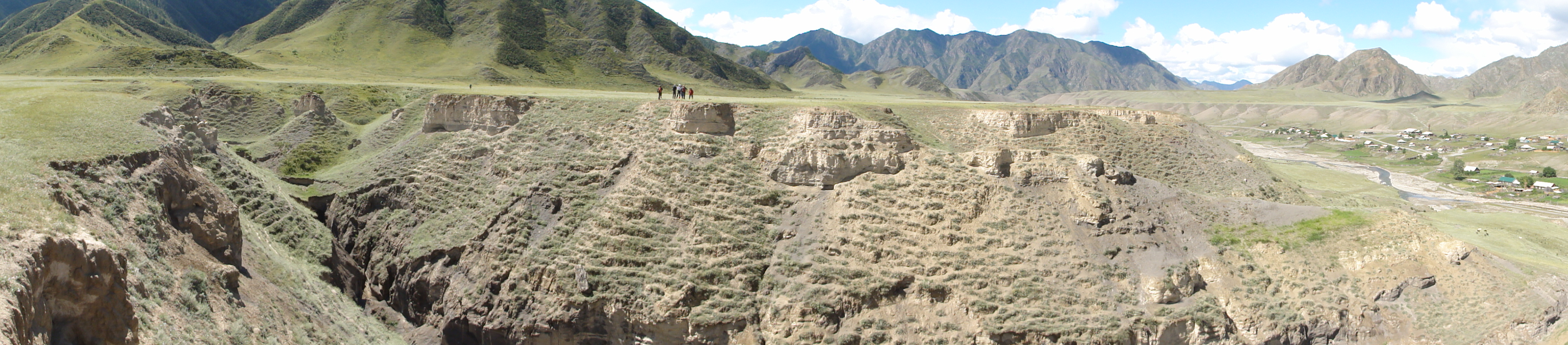
- The village is on the right

- Location within Altai Republic Location within Russia
- Coordinates: 50°26′N 86°40′E
- Country: Russia
- Region: Altai Republic
- District: Ongudaysky District
- Time zone: UTC+7:00

Malaya Inya (Russian: Малая Иня; Altay: Кичӱ Ийин, Kiçü İyin) is a rural locality (a selo) in Minusinsky District, the Altai Republic, Russia. The population was 181 as of 2016. There are 3 streets.

== Geography ==
Malaya Inya is located 73 km southeast of Onguday (the district's administrative centre) by road. Inya is the nearest rural locality.
