= Souzga =

Souzga Соузга
- Village
- Location within Altai Republic Location within Russia
- Coordinates: 51°53′N 85°51′E
- Country: Russia
- Region: Altai Republic
- District: Mayminsky District
- Time zone: UTC+7:00

Souzga (Russian: Соузга; Altay: Суску, Susku) is a rural locality (a selo) and the administrative centre of Souzginskoye Rural Settlement of Mayminsky District, the Altai Republic, Russia. The population was 1267 as of 2016. There are 12 streets.

== Geography ==
Souzga is located on the Katun River, 17 km south of Mayma (the district's administrative centre) by road. Turbaza "Yunost" is the nearest rural locality.
