= Ozyorny =

Ozyorny (masculine), Ozyornaya (feminine), Ozyornoye (neuter), or Ozyornye (plural for all genders) may refer to:

- Ozyorny (inhabited locality) (Ozerny, Ozyornaya, Ozyornoye), name of several inhabited localities in Russia
- Ozyornaya (Moscow Metro), a metro station in Moscow, Russia.
- Ozyornaya railway station, a railway station in Saint Peterburg, Russia
- Ozerne (air base), an air base in Zhytomyr Oblast, Ukraine
- Ozernoye, Panfilov District, a settlement in Chüy Region, Kyrgyzstan
- Mayly, formerly known as Ozyornoye, Pavlodar Region, Kazakhstan

== Rivers ==
- Ozyornaya (river, Severnaya Zemlya), a river on October Revolution Island in Krasnoyarsk Krai, Russia
- Ozyornaya (river, Sea of Okhotsk), a river in Kamchatka Krai, Russia

== See also ==
- Ozyornye, a village in Kirov Oblast, Russia
- Ozerne (disambiguation)
