= Inya =

Inya may refer to:

- Inya (river), a tributary of the Ob in Russia
- Inya (Sea of Okhotsk), a river in Khabarovsk Krai
- Inya (rural locality), a village in Altai Republic, Russia
- Inya Lake, a lake in Yangon, Myanmar
- Inya, Ngazun, a village in Ngazun Township, Mandalay Region, Myanmar
- Inya, Tada-U, a village in Tada-U Township, Mandalay Region, Myanmar
- Inya, Pyay, a village in Pyay Township, Bago Region, Myanmar
- Inya, another name for the Burmese author Nu Nu Yi
