= Chuya (disambiguation) =

The Chuya is a tributary of the Katun, in Altai Republic, Russia.

Chuya may also refer to:

== People with the given name ==
- Marubashi Chūya (丸橋 忠弥; died 1651), Japanese rōnin, instructor in martial arts and military strategy
- María de Jesús "Chuya" Díaz Marmolejo (born 1967), Mexican politician
- Chūya Nakahara (中原 中也; 1907–1937), Japanese poet
- Chūya Koyama (小山 宙哉; born 1978), Japanese writer

== Places ==
- Chuya (Irkutsk Oblast), an abolished village in Mamsko-Chuysky District, Irkutsk Oblast, Russia
- Chuya (Lena), a tributary of the Lena, in Buryatia and Irkutsk Oblast, Russia
- Chuya, Altai (river), is a river in the Altai Republic in Russia
- Chuya Belki, a mountainous region in the Altai Mountains
- Chuya Steppe, an intermontane basin in the Altai Mountains

== See also ==
- Chuja (disambiguation)
