= Ozenne =

Ozenne may refer to:

- Julie Ozenne (born 1978), French politician
- Le Mesnil-Ozenne, commune in Normandy

== See also ==
- Ozerne
