= Inya (rural locality) =

Inya Иня
- Village
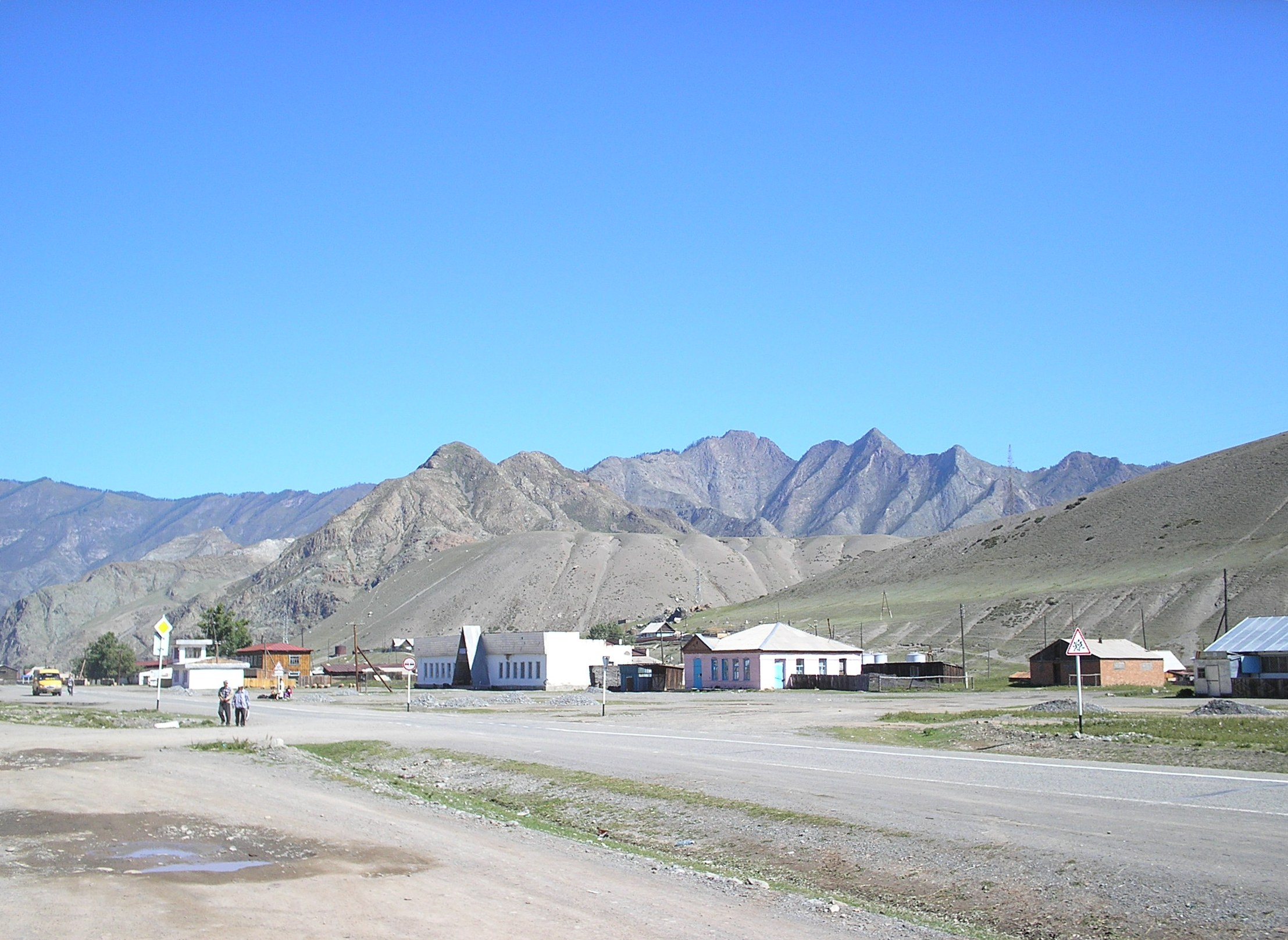

- Location within Altai Republic Location within Russia
- Coordinates: 50°27′N 86°37′E
- Country: Russia
- Region: Altai Republic
- District: Ongudaysky District
- Time zone: UTC+7:00

Inya (Russian: Иня; Altay: Ийин, İyin) is a rural locality (a selo) in Ininskoye Rural Settlement of Ongudaysky District, the Altai Republic, Russia. The population was 730 as of 2016.

== Geography ==
Inya is located on the right bank of the Katun River, 68 km southeast of Onguday (the district's administrative centre) by road. Malaya Inya is the nearest rural locality.
