= Sredny Saydys =

Sredny Saydys Средний Сайдыс
- Village
- Location within Altai Republic Location within Russia
- Coordinates: 51°45′N 86°09′E
- Country: Russia
- Region: Altai Republic
- District: Mayminsky District
- Time zone: UTC+7:00

Sredny Saydys (Russian: Средний Сайдыс; Altay: Орто Сайдыс, Orto Saydıs) is a rural locality (a selo) in Kyzyl-Ozyokskoye Rural Settlement of Mayminsky District, the Altai Republic, Russia. The population was 203 as of 2016. There are 5 streets.

== Geography ==
Sredny Saydys is located on the Saydys River, 43 km southeast of Mayma (the district's administrative centre) by road. Alexandrovka is the nearest rural locality.
