= Ozyornoye, Mayminsky District, Altai Republic =

Ozyornoye, Mayminsky District, Altai Republic Озёрное
- Village
- Location within Altai Republic Location within Russia
- Coordinates: 51°48′N 85°47′E
- Country: Russia
- Region: Altai Republic
- District: Mayminsky District
- Time zone: UTC+7:00

Ozyornoye (Russian: Озёрное; Altay: Кӧл-Јик, Köl-Ĵik) is a rural locality (a selo) in the Manzherokskoye Rural Settlement of Mayminsky District, Altai Republic, Russia. The population was 167 as of 2016. There are 36 streets in the locality.

== Geography ==
Ozyornoye is located 34 km south of Mayma (the district's administrative centre) by road. Manzherok is the nearest rural locality.
