= Argut =

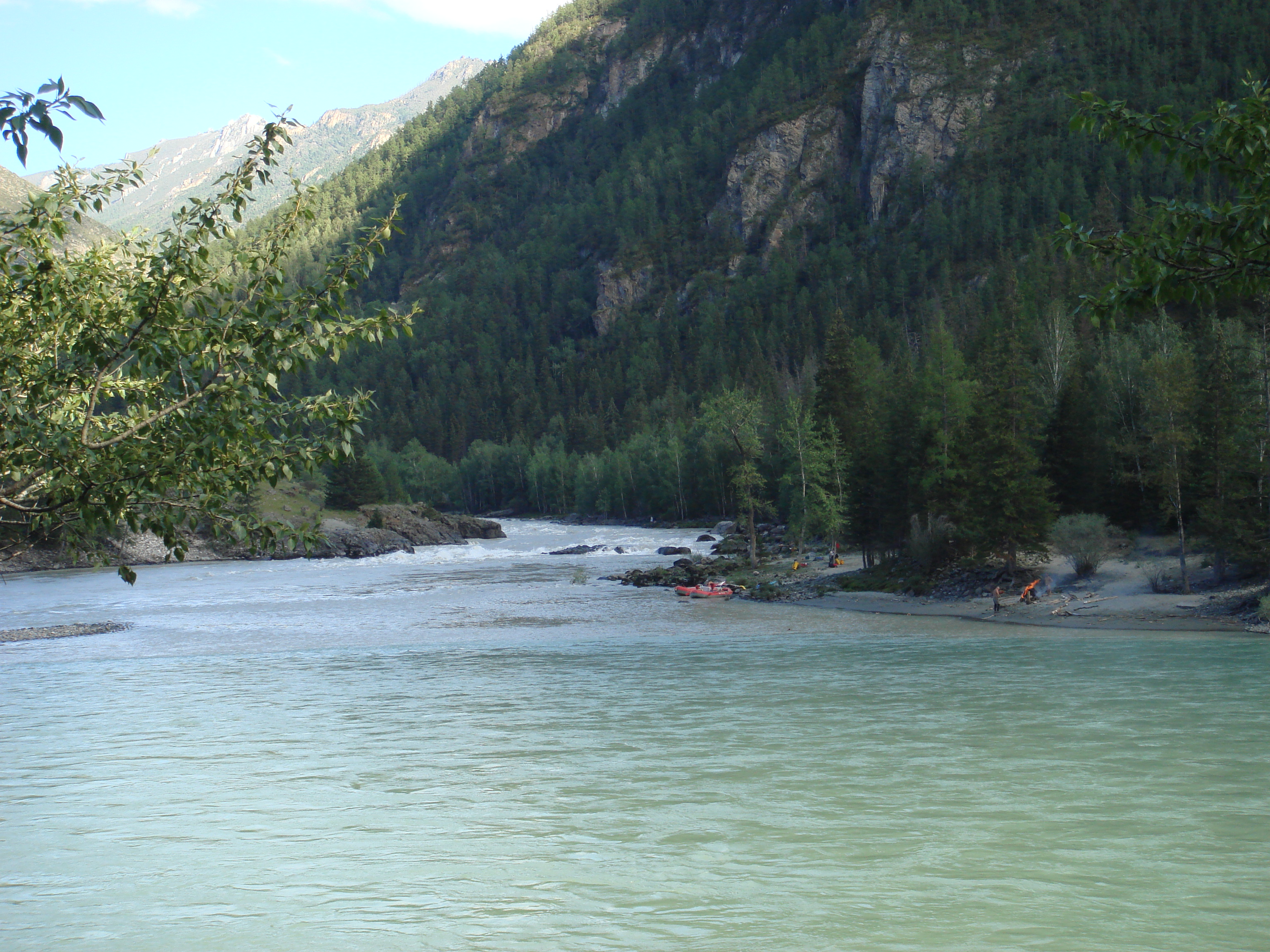

Location
- Country: Russia

Physical characteristics
- Mouth: Katun
  - coordinates: 50°14′20″N 86°40′34″E
- Length: 232 km (144 mi)
- Basin size: 9,550 km^{2} (3,690 sq mi)

Basin features
- Progression: Katun→ Ob→ Kara Sea

The Argut (Russian: Аргут; Altay: Аркыт, romanized: Arqıt) is a river in central Altai Republic, a right tributary of Katun. Upstream from its confluence with the Dzhazator, it is called Akalakha.

== Geography ==
The Argut is 232 kilometres (144 mi) long (including Akalakha), and has a drainage basin of 9,550 square kilometres (3,690 sq mi). Due to the abundance of glaciers 40% of the runoff is yielded glaciers and permanent snow (in particular, from the northern slope of the Tavan Bogd massif), 34% - seasonal snow 17% - rain, 9% - by groundwater. The river is frozen from November until April.
