= Chuja =

Chuja may refer to:

- Chuja Islands, South Korean archipelago between Jeju and Wando
- Chunja, Rapti, village in Nepal

== See also ==
- Chuya (disambiguation)
