= Lake Cheybek-Kohl =

Lake in Russia

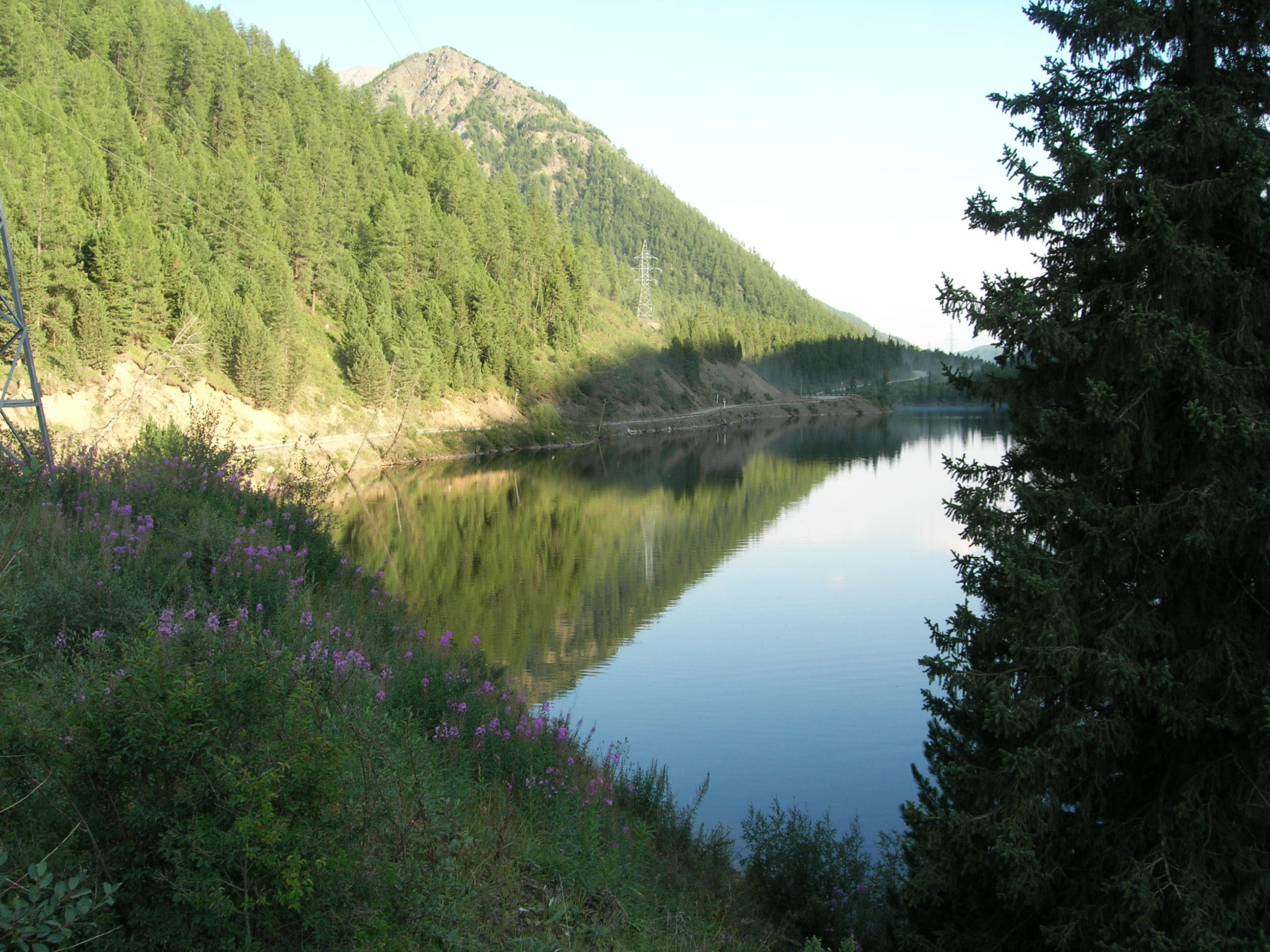
- The northern bank

- Location within Altai Republic Location within Russia
- Location: Altai Republic
- Coordinates: 50°24′00″N 87°36′00″E
- Primary inflows: Chibit River
- Primary outflows: Chibit River
- Basin countries: Russia
- Max. length: 1,735 m (5,692 ft)
- Max. width: 425 m (1,394 ft)
- Max. depth: 33 m (108 ft)
- Surface elevation: 1,816 m (5,958 ft)

Lake Cheybek-Kohl (Russian: Чейбеккёль, Altay: Чӧйбӧк-Кӧл, Çöybök-Köl, literally: "Long Lake") (or Dead lake) is in Altai Mountains and the Altai Republic, Russia. It is located in the upper reaches of the Chibit River, at elevation 1816 m. The lake is a natural phenomenon — it was formed by the damming of the river. It belongs to dam type of the lakes.

Because the lake has no fish, it is called Dead. An early theory for lack of fish was that there may be mercury in the water. From this, Ivan Efremov wrote the story "Lake of Mountains' spirits". The Mercury content is normal, but there are still no fish in the lake, because they can't be lifted to the lake. Now Cheubek-Kohl rental, there are growing fish.

== Sources ==
1. Т. Вдовина, Т. И. Злобина, О. Полунина Достопримечательности Горного Алтая. — Барнаул: Пять плюс, 2008. — 232 с. — ISBN 978-5-9900731-8-0 (in Russian)
