= Ust-Sema =

Ust-Sema Усть-Сема
- Village
- Location within Altai Republic Location within Russia
- Coordinates: 51°38′N 85°45′E
- Country: Russia
- Region: Altai Republic
- District: Chemalsky District
- Time zone: UTC+7:00

Ust-Sema (Russian: Усть-Сема; Altay: Себи-Оозы, romanized: Sebi-Ôzı) is a rural locality (a selo) in Cheposhskoye Rural Settlement of Chemalsky District, the Altai Republic, Russia. The population was 402 as of 2016. There are 15 streets.

== Geography ==
Ust-Sema is located on the right bank of the Katun River, 37 km northwest of Chemal (the district's administrative centre) by road. Verkh Barangol is the nearest rural locality.
