= Srostki =

Srostki Сростки
- Selo
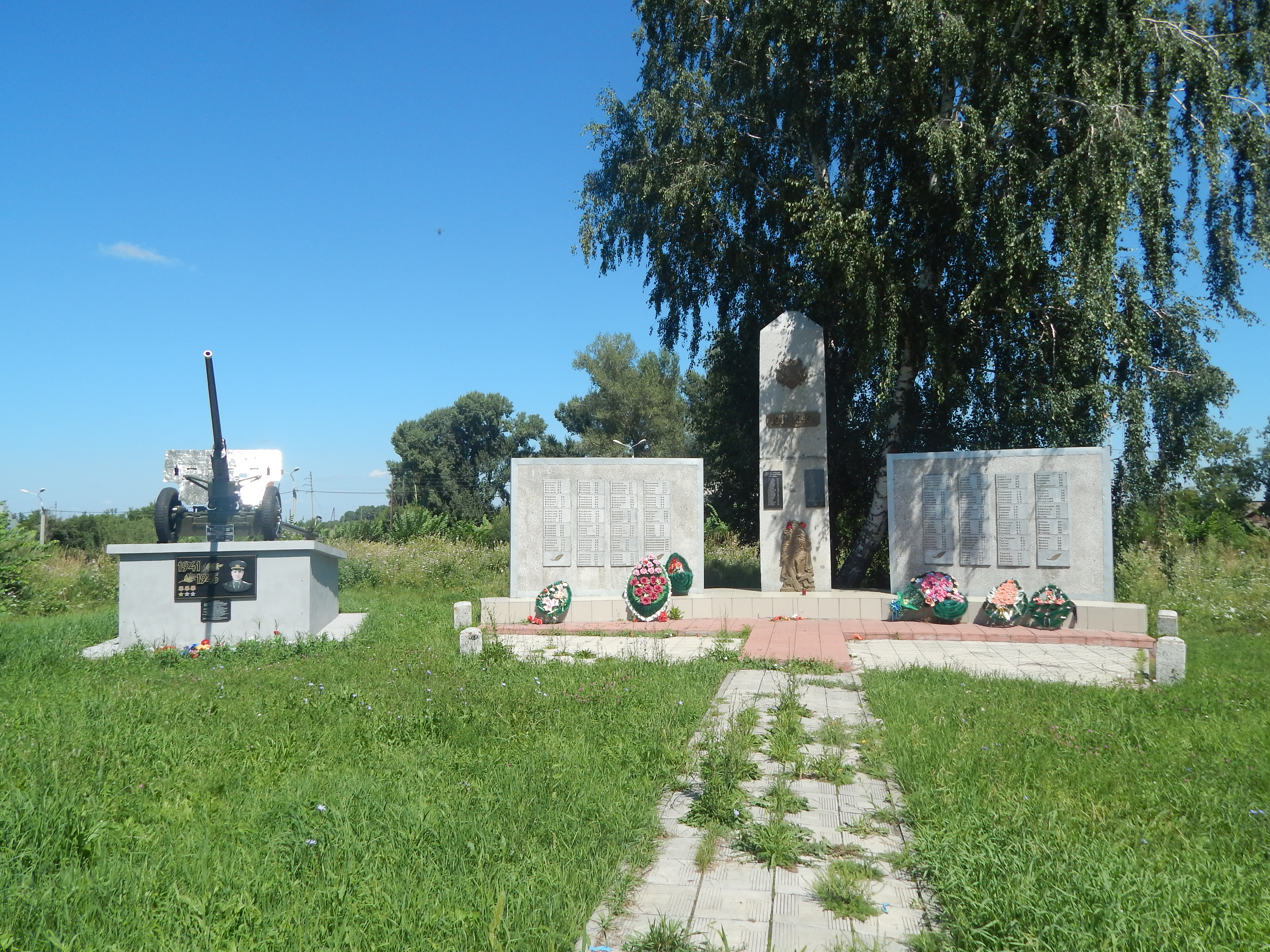
- Memorial of World War II

- Location within Altai Krai Location within Russia
- Coordinates: 52°25′N 85°42′E
- Country: Russia
- Region: Altai Krai
- District: Biysky District
- Time zone: UTC+7:00

Srostki (Russian: Сростки) is a rural locality (a selo) and the administrative center of Srostinsky selsoviet, Biysky District, Altai Krai, Russia. The population was 2,769 as of 2013. There are 30 streets.

Vasily Shukshin, a prominent Soviet actor and Village Prose writer, was born here in 1929.

== Geography ==
Srostki is located on the Katun River, 37 km southeast of Biysk (the district's administrative centre) by road. Talitsa is the nearest rural locality.
