= Kuyus =

Kuyus Куюс
- Village
- Location within Altai Republic Location within Russia
- Coordinates: 51°01′N 86°14′E
- Country: Russia
- Region: Altai Republic
- District: Chemalsky District
- Time zone: UTC+7:00

Kuyus (Russian: Куюс; Altay: Куйус, Kuyus) is a rural locality (a selo) and the administrative centre of Kuyusskoye Rural Settlement of Chemalsky District, the Altai Republic, Russia. The population was 210 as of 2016. There are 6 streets.

== Geography ==
Kuyus is located in the valley of the Katun River, 55 km south of Chemal (the district's administrative centre) by road. Oroktoy is the nearest rural locality.
