= Manzherok =

Manzherok Манжерок
- Village
- Location within Altai Republic Location within Russia
- Coordinates: 51°49′N 85°46′E
- Country: Russia
- Region: Altai Republic
- District: Mayminsky District
- Time zone: UTC+7:00

Manzherok (Russian: Манжерок; Altay: Ман-Јӱрек, Man-Ĵürek) is a rural locality (a selo) in Manzherokskoye Rural Settlement of Mayminsky District, the Altai Republic, Russia. The population was 1567 as of 2016. There are 44 streets.

== Geography ==
Manzherok is located on the Katun River, 31 km southwest of Mayma (the district's administrative centre) by road. Ozyorny is the nearest rural locality.
