= Verkh-Katunskoye =

Verkh-Katunskoye Верх-Катунское
- Selo
- Location within Altai Krai Location within Russia
- Coordinates: 52°27′N 85°26′E
- Country: Russia
- Region: Altai Krai
- District: Biysky District
- Time zone: UTC+7:00

Verkh-Katunskoye (Russian: Верх-Катунское) is a rural locality (a selo) and the administrative center of Verkh-Katunsky Selsoviet, Biysky District, Altai Krai, Russia. The population was 2,723 as of 2013. There are 29 streets.

== Geography ==
Verkh-Katunskoye is located on the Katun River, 19 km southeast of Biysk (the district's administrative centre) by road. Chuysky is the nearest rural locality.
