= Külle =

Külle Күлле
- posyolok
- Location within Tatarstan
- Country: Russia
- Region: Tatarstan
- District: Biektaw District
- Time zone: UTC+3:00

Külle (Tatar: Күлле, romanized: Külle) is a rural locality (a posyolok) in Biektaw District, Tatarstan. The population was 494 as of 2010. Külle is located 20 km west of Biektaw, district's administrative centre, and 21 km north of Qazan, republic's capital, by road.

The village was established in 1980.

There are 14 streets in the village.
