= Ozyornoye, Jewish Autonomous Oblast =

Ozyornoye Озёрное
- Selo
- Location within Jewish Autonomous Oblast Location within Russia
- Coordinates: 48°07′N 131°17′E
- Country: Russia
- Region: Jewish Autonomous Oblast
- District: Oktyabrsky District
- Time zone: UTC+10:00

Ozyornoye (Russian: Озёрное) is a rural locality (a selo) in Oktyabrsky District, Jewish Autonomous Oblast, Russia. Population: 211 (2010 census); 294 (2002 census); There are 15 streets in this selo.

== Geography ==
This rural locality is located 7 km from Amurzet (the district's administrative centre), 177 km from Birobidzhan (capital of Jewish Autonomous Oblast) and 7,048 km from Moscow. Puzino is the nearest rural locality.
