= Ozyorny, Republic of Bashkortostan =

Ozyorny Озёрный
- Selo
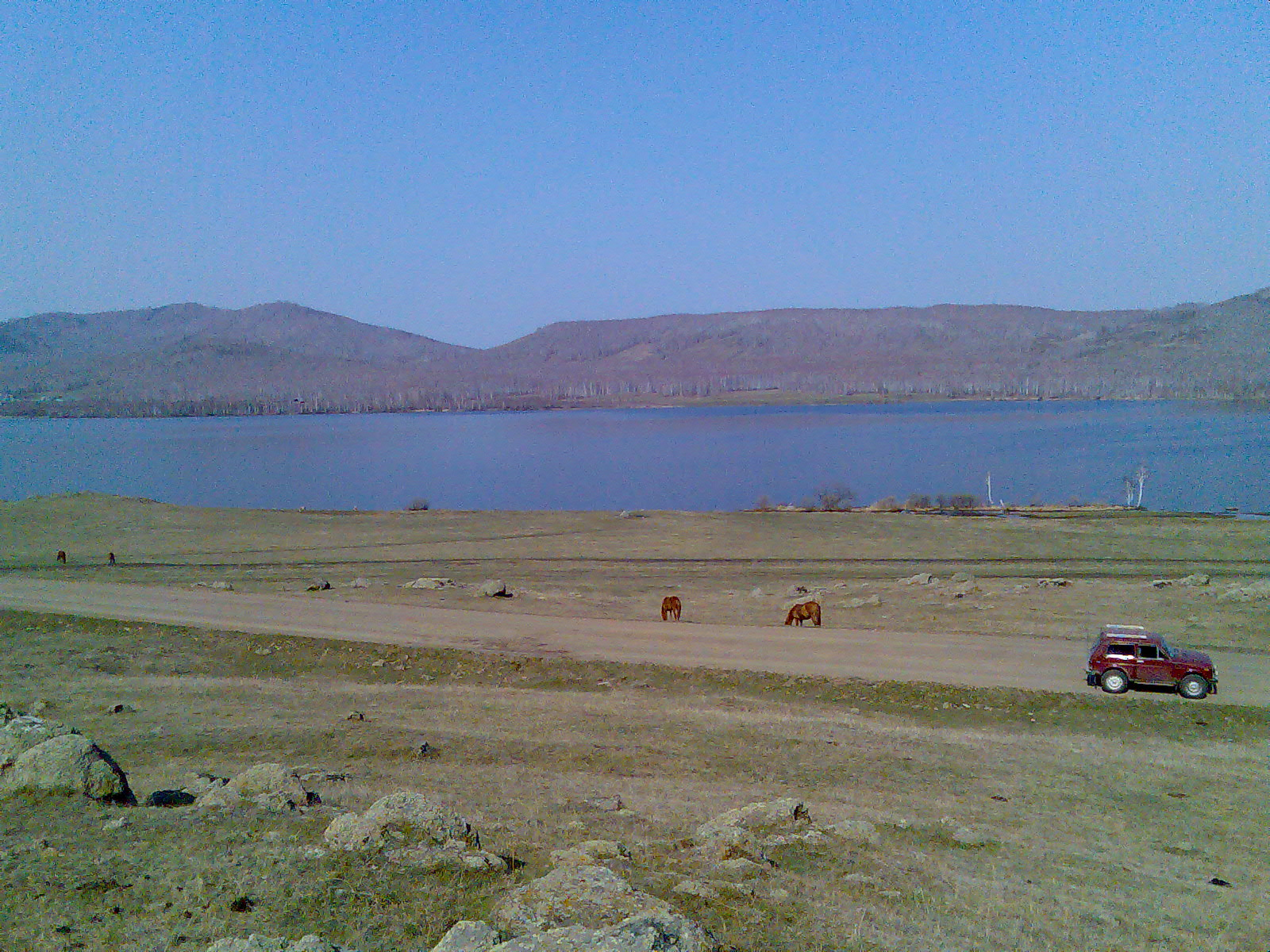
- Lake Uzunkul near Ozyorny

- Location within Bashkortostan Location within Russia
- Coordinates: 53°57′N 58°51′E
- Country: Russia
- Region: Bashkortostan
- District: Uchalinsky District
- Time zone: UTC+5:00
- Postal code: 453746

Ozyorny (Russian: Озёрный; Bashkir: Яңы Оҙонгүл, Yañı Oźongül) is a rural locality (a selo) that is located in Mindyaksky Selsoviet, Uchalinsky District, Bashkortostan, Russia. The population was 404 as of 2010. There are 9 streets.

== Geography ==
Ozyorny is located 72 km southwest of Uchaly (the district's administrative centre) by road. Uzungulovo is the nearest rural locality.
