= Ozernoye, Republic of Bashkortostan =

Ozernoye Озёрное
- Village
- Location within Bashkortostan Location within Russia
- Coordinates: 53°27′N 58°48′E
- Country: Russia
- Region: Bashkortostan
- District: Abzelilovsky District
- Time zone: UTC+5:00

Ozernoye (Russian: Озёрное) is a rural locality (a village) in Krasnobashkirsky Selsoviet, Abzelilovsky District, Bashkortostan, Russia. The population was 595 as of 2010. There are 8 streets.

== Geography ==
Ozernoye is located 31 km northeast of Askarovo (the district's administrative centre) by road. Mikhaylovka is the nearest rural locality.
