= Chuya, Altai (river) =

Chuya
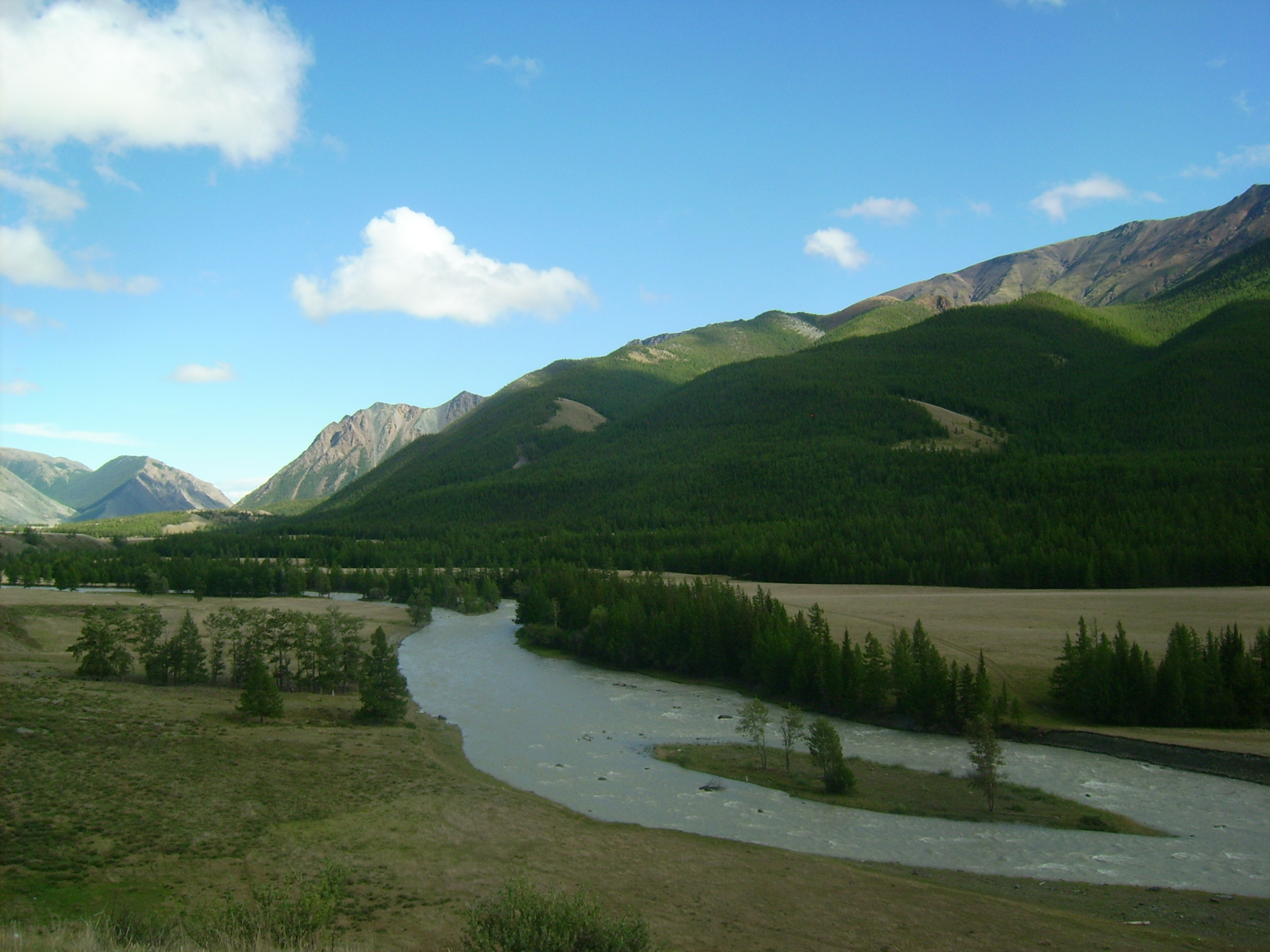

Location
- Country: Russia

Physical characteristics
- Mouth: Katun
  - coordinates: 50°23′38″N 86°40′22″E
- Length: 232 km (144 mi)
- Basin size: 9,550 km^{2} (3,690 sq mi)

Basin features
- Progression: Katun→ Ob→ Kara Sea

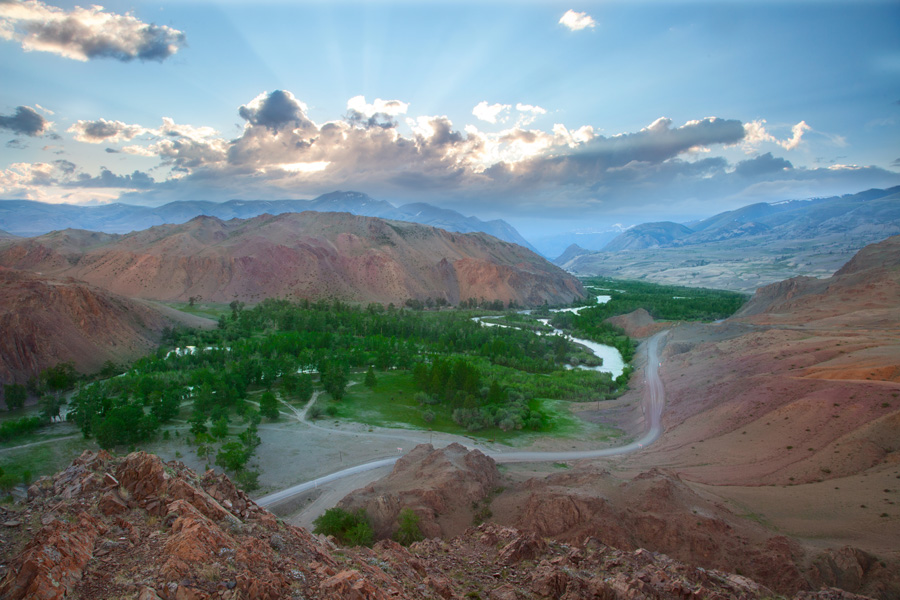
The Chuya

The Chuya (Russian: Чуя; Altay: Чуй, romanized: Çuy) is a river in the Altai Republic in Russia, a right tributary of the Katun (Ob's basin). The Chuya is 320 kilometres (200 mi) long, and its drainage basin covers 11,200 square kilometres (4,300 mi^{2}). The river freezes in October or early November and thaws in late April. The town Kosh-Agach lies on the Chuya. The Chuya Highway (R256) runs through its valley. One of its tributaries is the Chibitka.
