= Ozernoye, Astrakhan Oblast =

Ozernoye Озёрное
- Selo
- Location within Astrakhan Oblast Location within Russia
- Coordinates: 46°04′N 47°28′E
- Country: Russia
- Region: Astrakhan Oblast
- District: Ikryaninsky District
- Time zone: UTC+4:00

Ozernoye (Russian: Озёрное, Oirat: Ик Моһа) is a rural locality (a selo) and the administrative center of the Ozernovsky Selsoviet in Ikryaninsky District, Astrakhan Oblast, Russia. The population was 653 as of 2010. There are 2 streets in the locality.

== Name ==
The original name of the village given by its first Kalmyk inhabitants was Ик Моһа (Ik Moğa) which means 'big snake' in Kalmyk. It was renamed to Ozernoye by the local authorities in an effort to erase the area's Kalmyk history after the deportation of the Kalmyks to Siberia in 1943.

== Geography ==
Ozernoye is located 21 km west of Ikryanoye (the district's administrative centre) by road. Gusinoye is the nearest rural locality.
