= Chibit =

Chibit Чибит
- Village
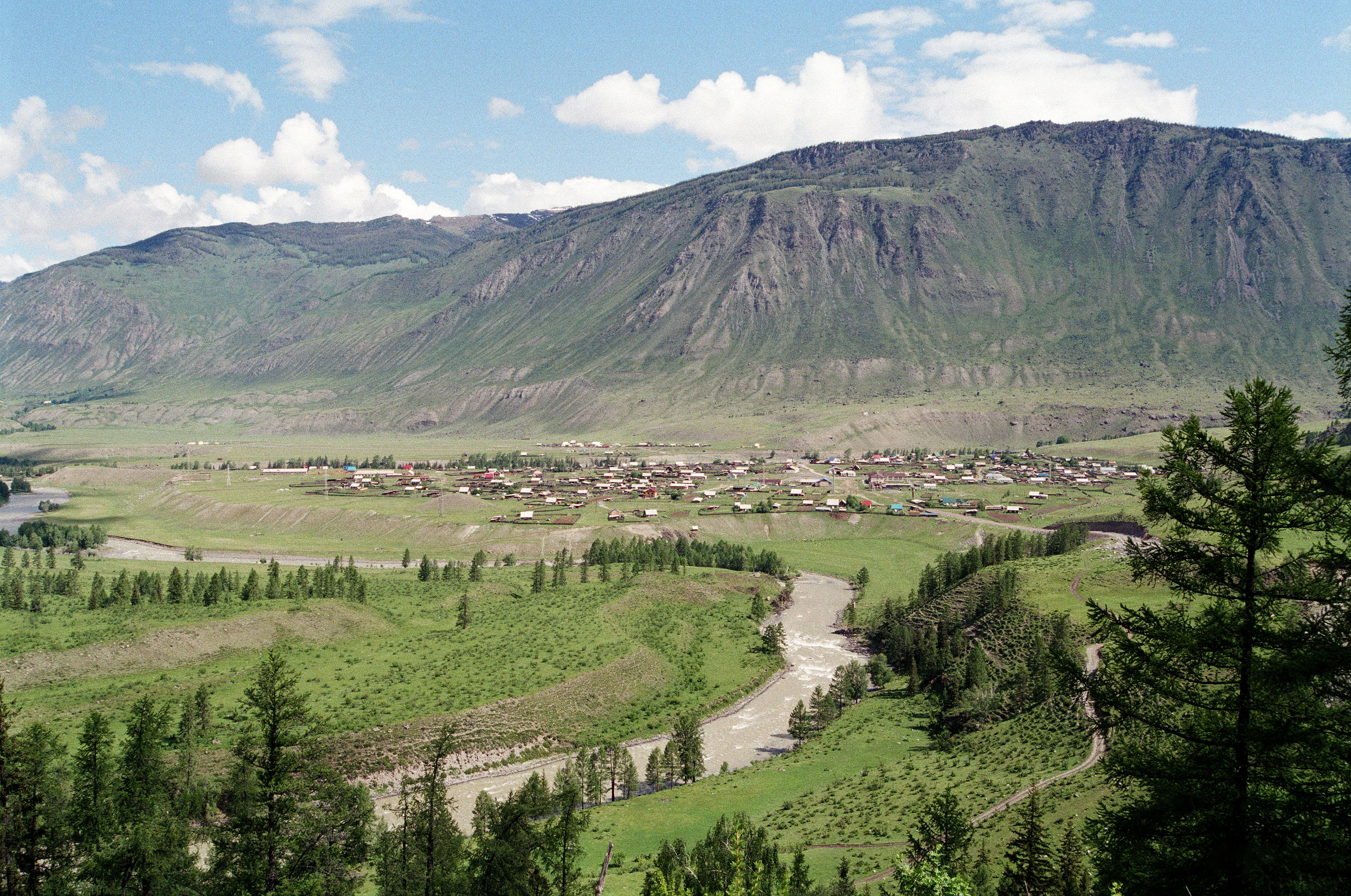

- Location within Altai Republic Location within Russia
- Coordinates: 50°19′N 87°30′E
- Country: Russia
- Region: Altai Republic
- District: Ulagansky District
- Time zone: UTC+7:00

Chibit (Russian: Чибит; Altay: Чибит, Çibit) is a rural locality (a selo) in Ulagansky District, the Altai Republic, Russia. The population was 622 as of 2016. There are 11 streets. The Chibitka River flows into the Chuya in Chibit.

== Geography ==
Chibit is located 63 km southwest of Ulagan (the district's administrative centre) by road. Aktash is the nearest rural locality.
