= Ozyornaya, Zabaykalsky Krai =

Ozyornaya Озёрная
- Selo
- Location within Zabaykalsky Krai Location within Russia
- Coordinates: 52°48′N 117°34′E
- Country: Russia
- Region: Zabaykalsky Krai
- District: Chernyshevsky District
- Time zone: UTC+9:00

Ozyornaya (Russian: Озёрная) is a rural locality (a selo) in Chernyshevsky District, Zabaykalsky Krai, Russia. Population: 19 (2021 census); 20 (2010 census); There are 2 streets in this selo.

== Geography ==
This rural locality is located 49 km from Chernyshevsk (the district's administrative centre), 287 km from Chita (capital of Zabaykalsky Krai) and 5,383 km from Moscow. Zhireken is the nearest rural locality.
