= Aya, Altai Krai =

Aya Ая
- Selo
- Location within Altai Krai Location within Russia
- Coordinates: 51°56′N 85°48′E
- Country: Russia
- Region: Altai Krai
- District: Altaysky District
- Time zone: UTC+7:00

Aya (Russian: Ая) is a rural locality (a selo) and the administrative center of Aysky Selsoviet, Altaysky District, Altai Krai, Russia. The population was 2,233 as of 2013. There are 23 streets.

== Geography ==
Aya is located on the Katun River, 43 km east of Altayskoye (the district's administrative centre) by road. Dubrovka is the nearest rural locality.
