= Ozyorny, Voronezh Oblast =

Ozyorny Озёрный
- Settlement
- Location within Voronezh Oblast Location within Russia
- Coordinates: 51°11′N 41°49′E
- Country: Russia
- Region: Voronezh Oblast
- District: Novokhopyorsky District
- Time zone: UTC+3:00

Ozyorny (Russian: Озёрный) is a rural locality (a settlement) in Novokhopyorsk, Novokhopyorsky District, Voronezh Oblast, Russia. The population was 239 as of 2010. There are 3 streets.

== Geography ==
Ozyorny is located 17 km northeast of Novokhopyorsk (the district's administrative centre) by road. Oktyabrskoye is the nearest rural locality.
