= Ursul (Russia) =

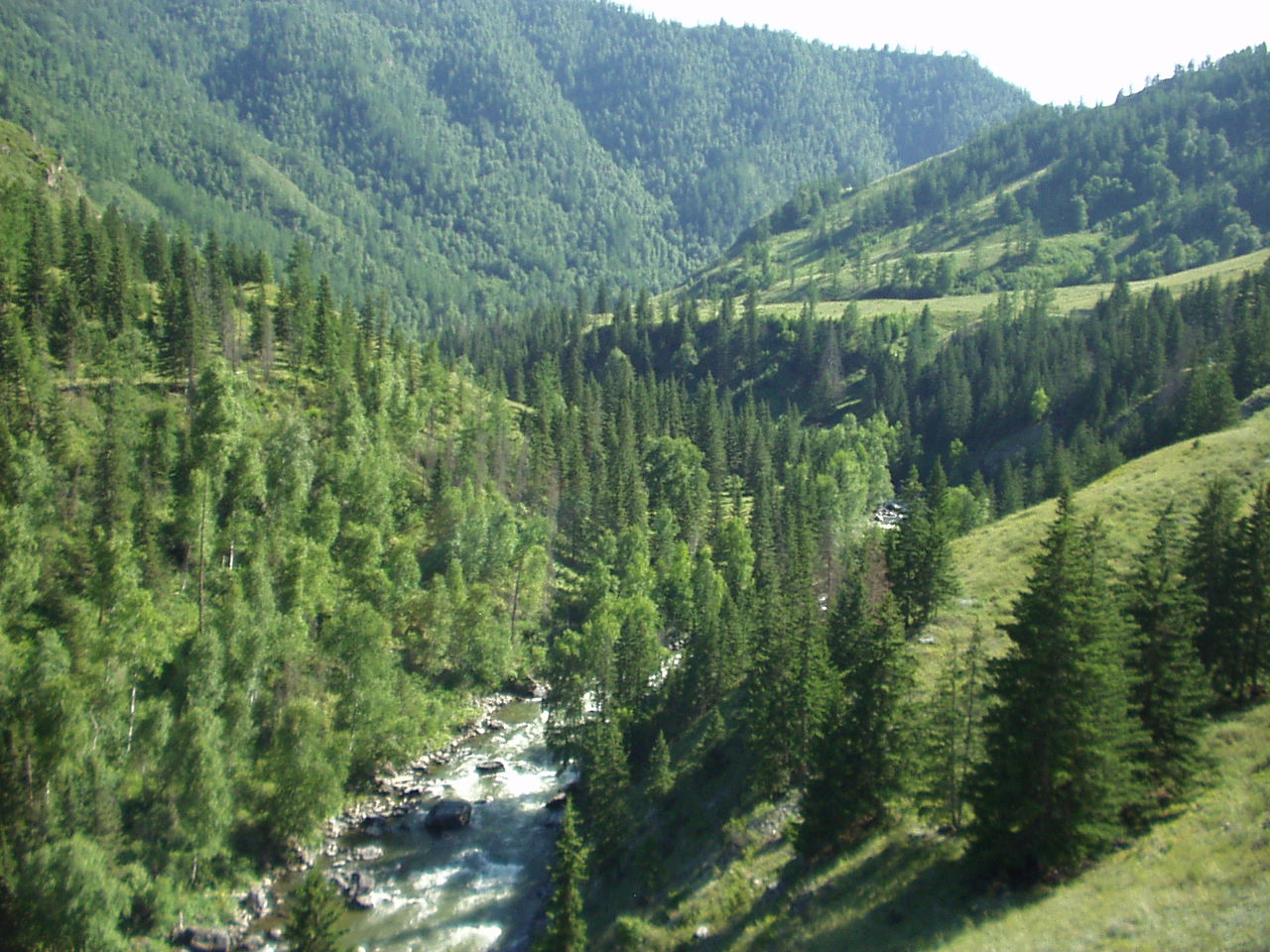

Location
- Country: Russia

Physical characteristics
- Mouth: Katun
  - coordinates: 50°46′23″N 86°27′50″E
- Length: 119 km (74 mi)
- Basin size: 3,710 km^{2} (1,430 sq mi)

Basin features
- Progression: Katun→ Ob→ Kara Sea

The Ursul (Russian: Урсул; Altay: Урсул) is a river of Ongudaysky District, in the Altai Republic, Russia. It is 119 kilometres (74 mi) long, and has a drainage basin of 3,710 square kilometres (1,430 sq mi). It is a tributary of Katun River. The town Onguday lies on the Ursul.

== Gallery ==
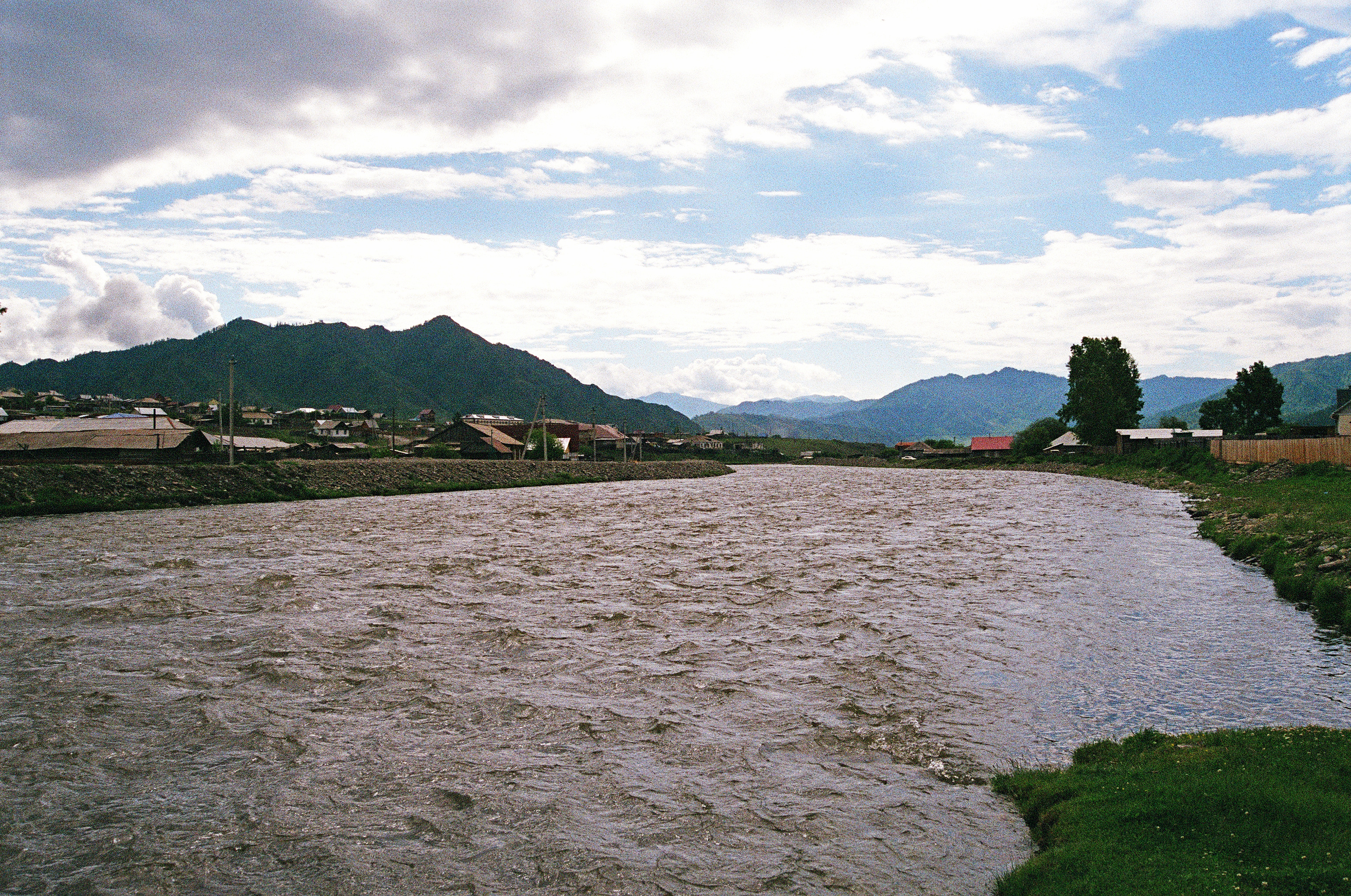
Onguday. Ursul River.
