= Ozerne =

Ozerne may refer to:

- Ozerne, Kramatorsk Raion, a village in Donetsk Oblast, Ukraine
- Ozerne, Zhytomyr Oblast, an urban-type settlement in Zhytomyr Oblast, Ukraine
- Ozerne (air base), an air base in Ozerne, Zhytomyr Oblast, Ukraine
- Ozerna, Edmonton, Canada, a neighborhood
