= Naum Olev =

Russian lyricist

Naum Mironovich Olev (Russian: Наум Миронович Олев, February 22, 1939, Moscow, USSR - April 10, 2009, Moscow, Russia) was a Russian lyricist of Jewish origin who penned the songs for Mary Poppins, Goodbye (1983) and Treasure Island (1988), among many other Soviet musical films.
