= Katun (river) =

- Etymology: Altai for 'woman', from Proto-Turkic *xātun 'queen, lady'
- Native name: Катунь (Russian)

Location
- Country: Russia
- Region: Altai Republic, Altai Krai

Physical characteristics
- Source: Katun Glacier
  - location: Belukha Mountain, Altai Republic
  - coordinates: 49.7635°N 86.564°E
  - elevation: 2,300 m (7,500 ft)
- Mouth: Ob
  - location: Confluence with Biya, near Biysk, Altai Krai
  - coordinates: 52°25′54″N 85°01′26″E
  - elevation: 195 m (640 ft)
- Length: 688 km (428 mi)
- Basin size: 60,900 km^{2} (23,500 sq mi)
- Discharge
  - location: Srostki, 58 kilometres (36 mi) from the mouth
  - average: 617 m^{3}/s (21,800 cu ft/s)
  - minimum: 16 m^{3}/s (570 cu ft/s)
  - maximum: 2,930 m^{3}/s (103,000 cu ft/s)

Basin features
- Progression: Ob→ Kara Sea
- Tributaries
  - left: Koksa, Ursul, Kamenka
  - right: Kucherla, Argut, Chuya, Isha

The Katun (Russian: Катунь [kɐˈtunʲ]; Altay: Кадын, romanized: Qadın [qɑˈdɯn]) is a river in the Altai Republic and the Altai Krai of Russia. It forms the Ob as it joins the Biya some 19 kilometres (12 mi) southwest of Biysk. The Katun is 688 kilometres (428 mi) long, and its drainage basin covers 60,900 square kilometres (23,500 mi^{2}). It originates in the Katun glaciers on the southwestern slope of Belukha Mountain.

The river freezes up in late November or early December and breaks up in early or mid-April. The main tributaries of the Katun are, from source to mouth: Koksa (left), Kucherla (right), Argut (right), Chuya (right), Ursul (left), Sema (left) and Isha (right). The river is navigable.

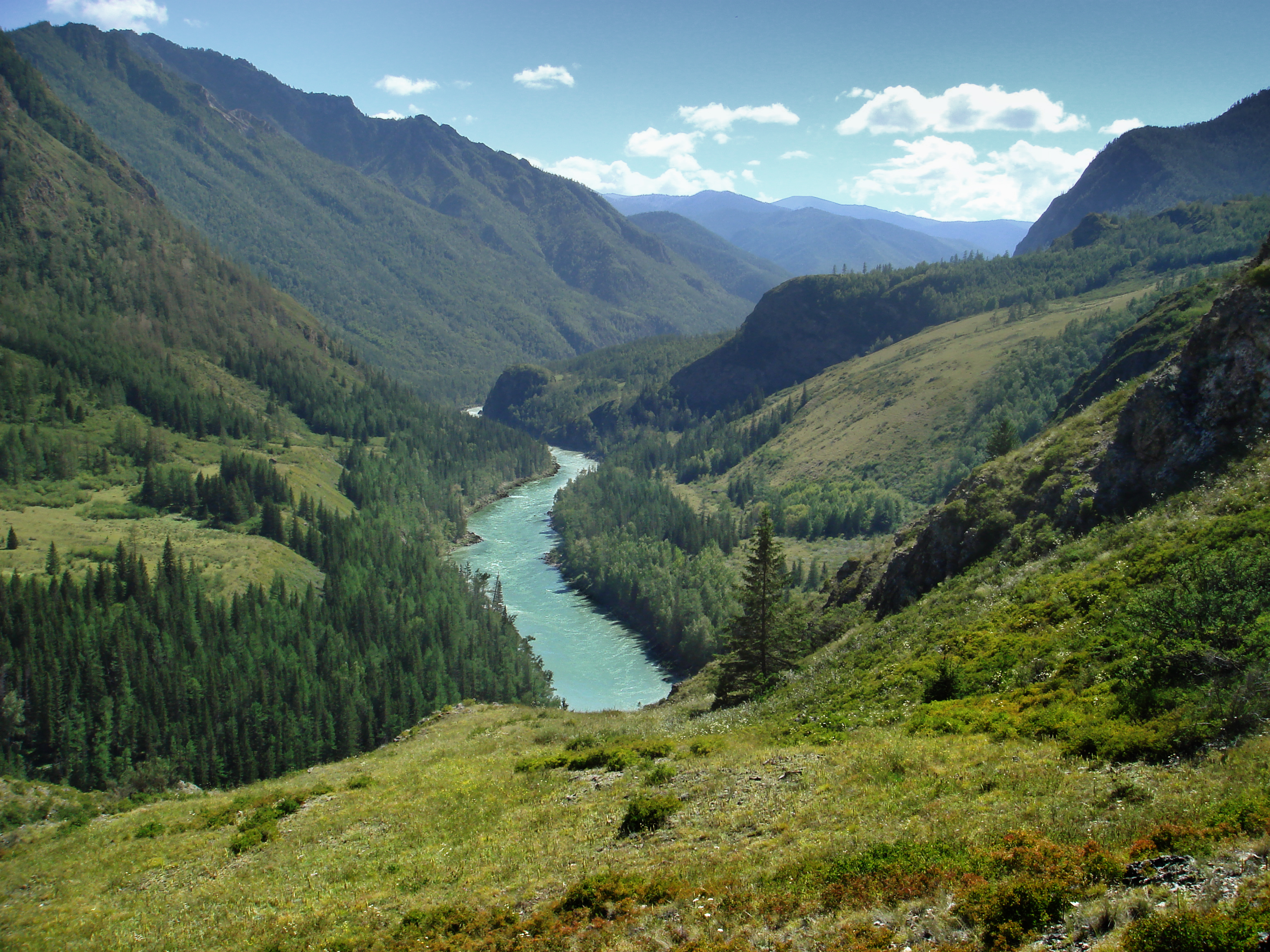
The Katun in the Altai Republic

In its upper reach of the Katun flows down a distant and sparsely populated area, but a few kilometers downstream near the village Kuyus, the coastal population density grows steadily and the area downstream of the village Ust-Sema is the most populated. There are numerous buildings, holiday camps and guest houses in the pine forest near the village. The main settlements along the Katun are, from source to mouth: Ust-Koksa, Katanda, Inya, Chemal, Manzherok, Souzga, Aya, Mayma, Srostki and Verkh-Katunskoye.

According to some geomorphologists, the so-called Altai flood swept along the Katun River at the end of the last ice age. This event probably helped define some peculiar features of the local landscape.
