= Onguday =

Onguday Онгудай
- Selo

Other transcription(s)
  - Altay: Оҥдой
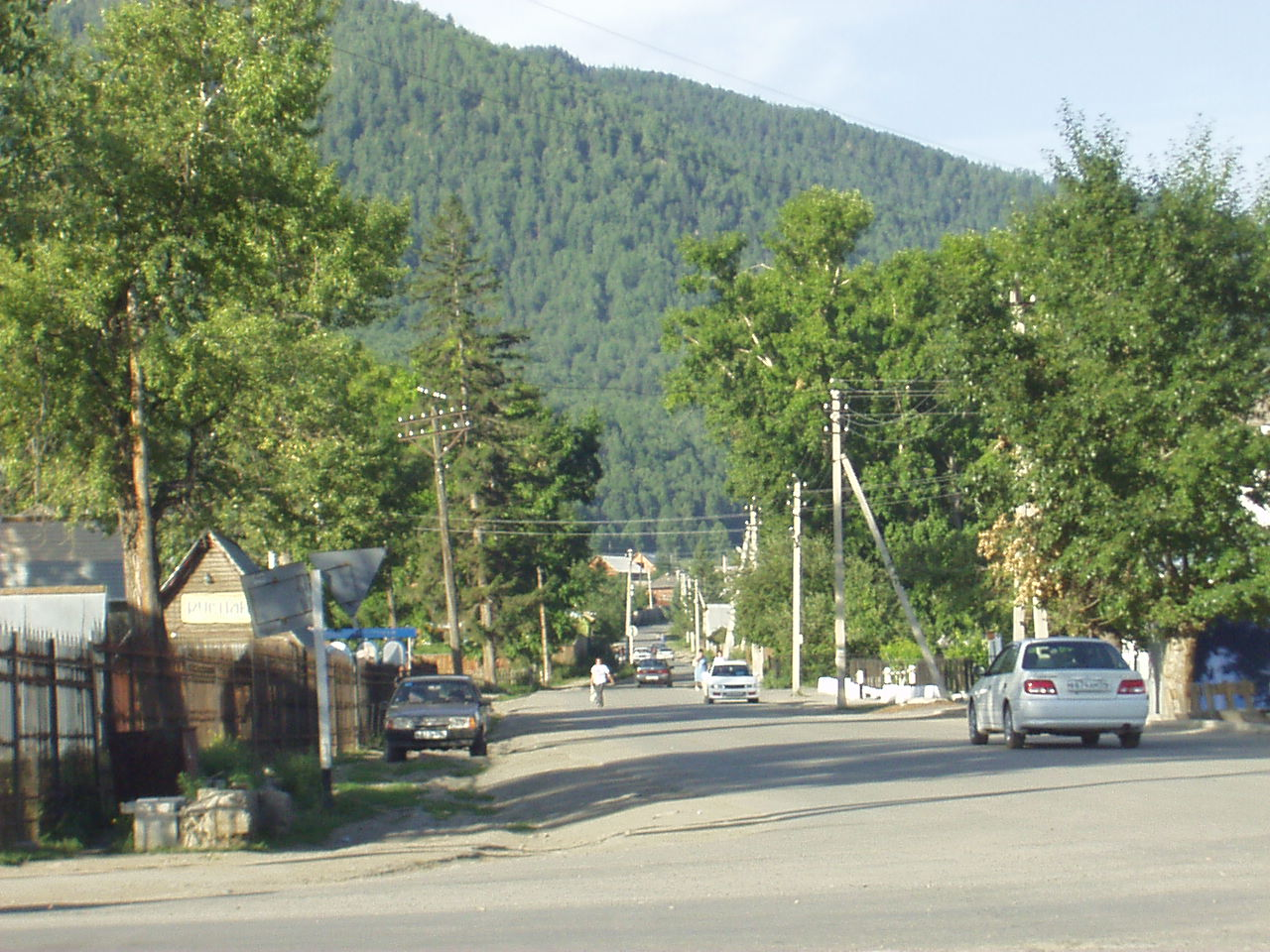

- Flag Coat of arms
- Interactive map of Onguday
- Location of Onguday Onguday (Altai Republic)
- Coordinates: 50°45′N 86°08′E
- Country: Russia
- Federal subject: Altai Republic
- Administrative district: Ongudaysky District
- SelsovietSelsoviet: Ongudaysky
- Founded: 1626
- Elevation: 860 m (2,820 ft)

Population (2010 Census)
  - Total: 5,655
  - Estimate (2021): 5,786 (+2.3%)

Administrative status
  - Capital of: Ongudaysky District, Ongudaysky Selsoviet

Municipal status
  - Municipal district: Ongudaysky Municipal District
  - Rural settlement: Ongudayskoye Rural Settlement
  - Capital of: Ongudaysky Municipal District, Ongudayskoye Rural Settlement
- Time zone: UTC+6 (MSK+3)
- Postal code: 649440
- OKTMO ID: 84620445101

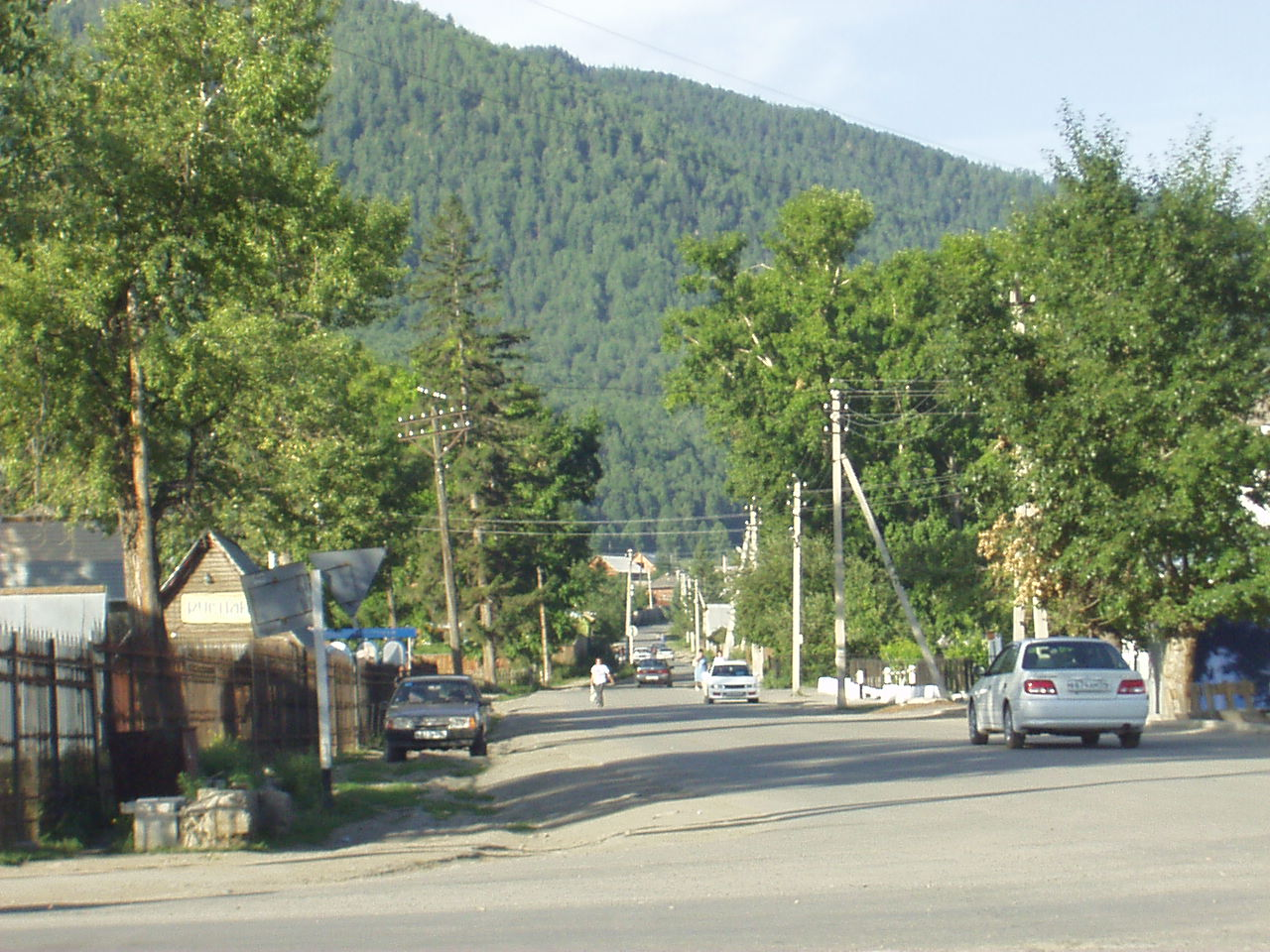
A street in Onguday

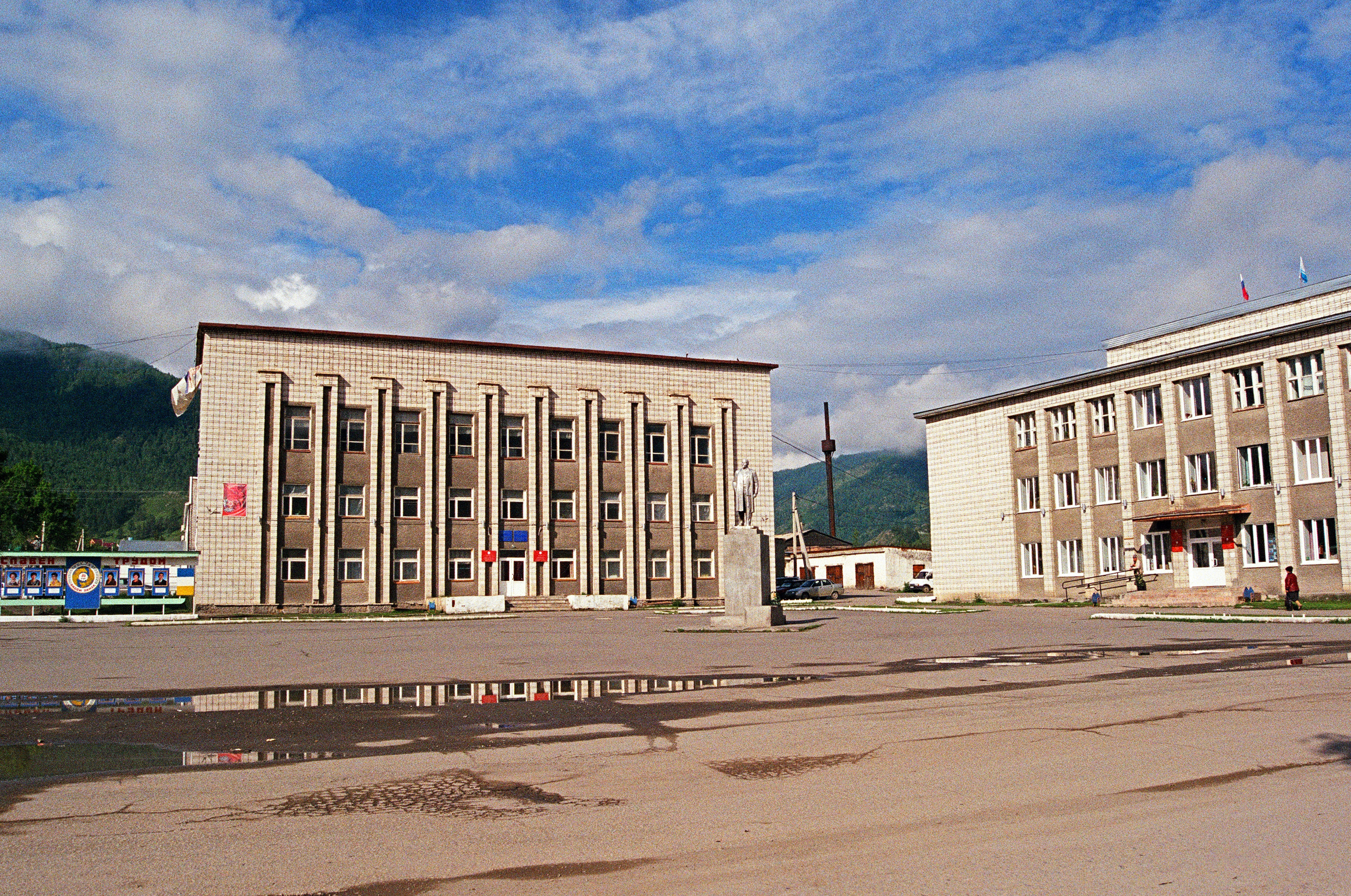
Lenin Square in Onguday

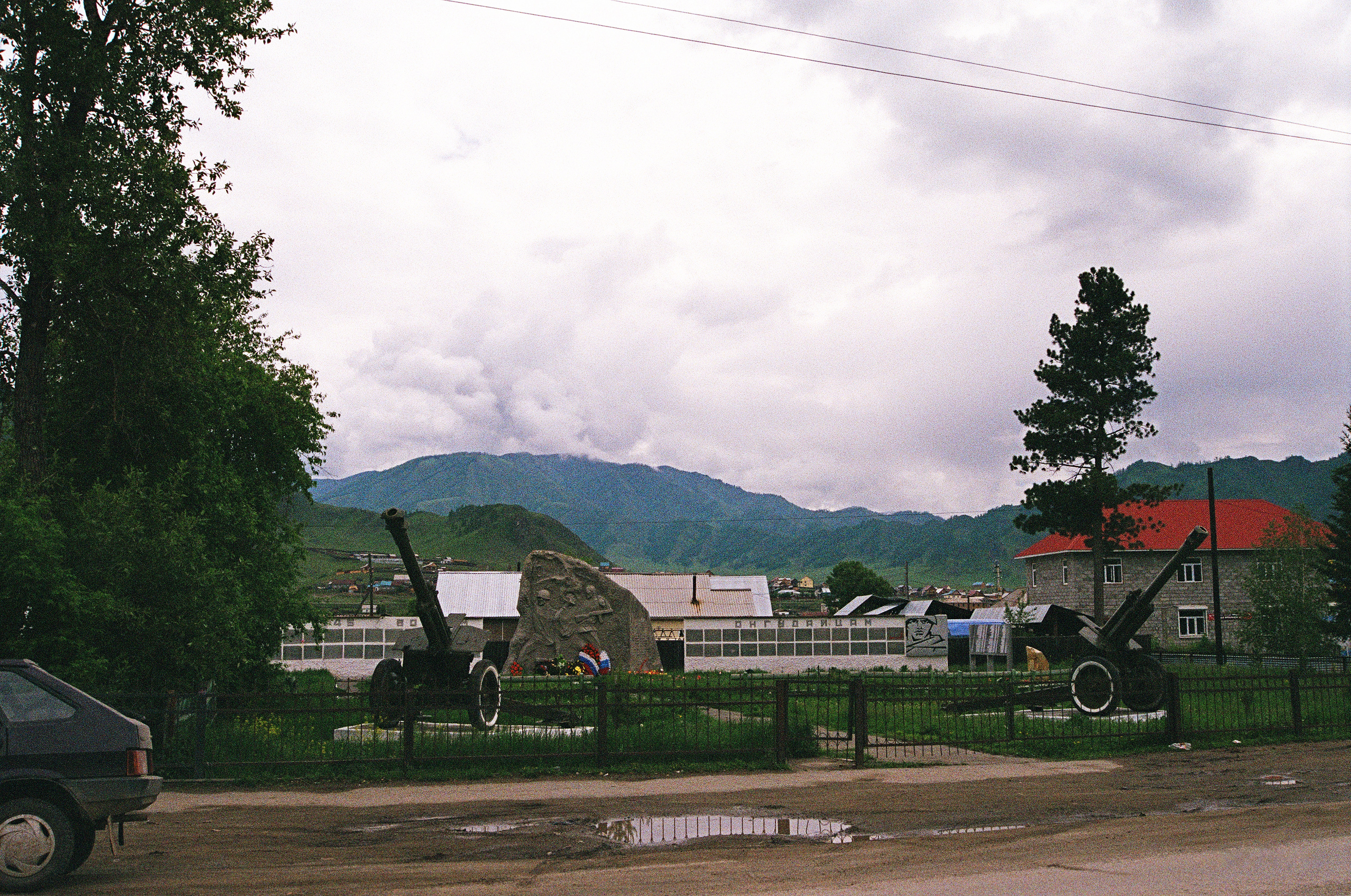
A public garden commemorating World War II veterans

Onguday population
- 2010 Census: 5,655
- 2002 Census: 5,376
- 1989 Census: 5,399
- 1979 Census: 4,472

Onguday (Russian: Онгуда́й; Altay: Оҥдой, Oñdoy) is a rural locality (a selo) and the administrative center of Ongudaysky District in the Altai Republic, Russia, located on the Ursul River, 210 kilometers (130 mi) from Gorno-Altaysk, the capital of the republic. As of the 2010 Census, its population was 5,655, consisting mainly of the Altai people and Russians.

== Etymology ==
Local name Ongdoy (from mongolian onge — "cave, cavity", doy — possession affix;literally — "having cave, cavities"

== History ==
It was founded in 1626. In 1856-1857, the camp-settlement of the Altai spiritual mission of the Russian Orthodox Church was founded. In 1860, the first school was opened, for which a building was built in 1881. In 1879, the Assumption Church was built and consecrated in 1881. In 1908 the Church of St. Innocent of Irkutsk was built. In 1910, about 800 people lived in the village.

== Climate ==
Onguday has a monsoon-influenced humid continental climate (Köppen Dwb) with warm, damp summers and frigid, dry winters. The warmest month is July, when the average temperature is, the highest temperature recorded being +39.7 °C (103.5 °F). The coldest month of the year is January, when the average temperature is −19.5 °C (−3.1 °F), with the record low of −43.9 °C (−47.0 °F).

Climate data for Onguday (1958–1997)
Month	Jan	Feb	Mar	Apr	May	Jun	Jul	Aug	Sep	Oct	Nov	Dec	Year
Record high °C (°F)	10.0 (50.0)	8.6 (47.5)	24.6 (76.3)	26.0 (78.8)	32.0 (89.6)	34.0 (93.2)	39.7 (103.5)	35.8 (96.4)	32.2 (90.0)	26.1 (79.0)	14.5 (58.1)	14.0 (57.2)	39.7 (103.5)
Mean daily maximum °C (°F)	−14.1 (6.6)	−9.4 (15.1)	0.9 (33.6)	11.2 (52.2)	17.8 (64.0)	22.6 (72.7)	24.2 (75.6)	21.8 (71.2)	16.7 (62.1)	7.8 (46.0)	−4.8 (23.4)	−13.1 (8.4)	6.8 (44.2)
Daily mean °C (°F)	−19.5 (−3.1)	−16.0 (3.2)	−6.1 (21.0)	3.9 (39.0)	10.5 (50.9)	15.2 (59.4)	16.9 (62.4)	14.3 (57.7)	8.9 (48.0)	1.2 (34.2)	−10.1 (13.8)	−18.0 (−0.4)	0.1 (32.2)
Mean daily minimum °C (°F)	−24.8 (−12.6)	−22.5 (−8.5)	−13.2 (8.2)	−3.9 (25.0)	2.8 (37.0)	7.7 (45.9)	10.0 (50.0)	7.4 (45.3)	1.8 (35.2)	−4.8 (23.4)	−15.3 (4.5)	−22.9 (−9.2)	−6.5 (20.3)
Record low °C (°F)	−43.9 (−47.0)	−38 (−36)	−33.9 (−29.0)	−22.8 (−9.0)	−10.2 (13.6)	−2.8 (27.0)	1.0 (33.8)	−2.8 (27.0)	−10 (14)	−26.2 (−15.2)	−41 (−42)	−43.9 (−47.0)	−43.9 (−47.0)
Average precipitation mm (inches)	9.6 (0.38)	5.2 (0.20)	16.4 (0.65)	34.0 (1.34)	67.4 (2.65)	71.1 (2.80)	66.7 (2.63)	52.3 (2.06)	45.8 (1.80)	32.3 (1.27)	29.4 (1.16)	17.3 (0.68)	447.5 (17.62)
Average precipitation days	3	2	3	5	8	10	11	11	6	5	5	6	81
Average relative humidity (%)	72.9	74.3	66.7	60.5	56.0	66.8	70.1	69.0	65.6	75.9	79.7	83.7	70.1
Source: Weatherbase
