= Ongudaysky District =

Ongudaysky District Онгудайский район (Russian)
- District

Other transcription(s)
  - Altay: Оҥдой аймак
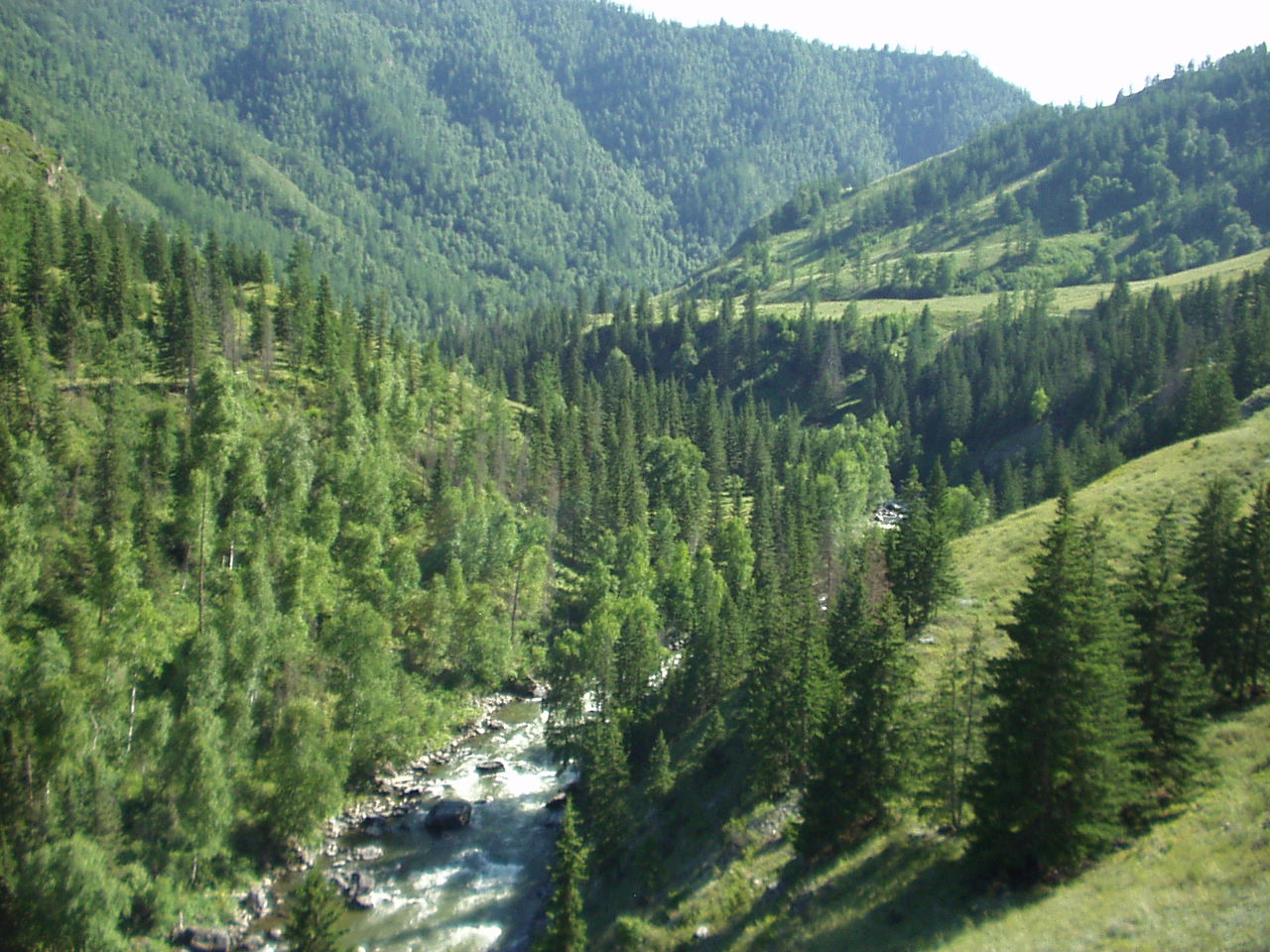
- The Ursul River in Ongudaysky District

- Flag Coat of arms
- Location of Ongudaysky District in the Altai Republic
- Coordinates: 50°45′N 86°07′E
- Country: Russia
- Federal subject: Altai Republic
- Established: 1924
- Administrative center: Onguday

Area
  - Total: 11,744 km^{2} (4,534 sq mi)

Population (2010 Census)
  - Total: 15,046
  - Density: 1.2812/km^{2} (3.3182/sq mi)
  - Urban: 0%
  - Rural: 100%

Administrative structure
  - Administrative divisions: 10 Rural settlements
  - Inhabited localities: 30 rural localities

Municipal structure
  - Municipally incorporated as: Ongudaysky Municipal District
  - Municipal divisions: 0 urban settlements, 10 rural settlements
- Time zone: UTC+6 (MSK+3)
- OKTMO ID: 84620000
- Website: http://www.ongudai-ra.ru

Population of Ongudaysky District
- 2010 Census: 15,046
- 2002 Census: 15,642
- 1989 Census: 16,417
- 1979 Census: 14,964

Ongudaysky District (Russian: Онгуда́йский райо́н; Altay: Оҥдой аймак, Oñdoy aymak) is an administrative and municipal district (raion), one of the ten in the Altai Republic, Russia. It is located in the center of the republic. The area of the district is 11,744 square kilometers (4,534 sq mi). Its administrative center is the rural locality (a selo) of Onguday. As of the 2010 Census, the total population of the district was 15,046, with the population of Onguday accounting for 37.6% of that number.

== Administrative and municipal status ==
Within the framework of administrative divisions, Ongudaysky District is one of the ten in the Altai Republic. As a municipal division, the district is incorporated as Ongudaysky Municipal District. Both administrative and municipal districts are divided into the same ten rural settlements, comprising thirty rural localities. The selo of Onguday serves as the administrative center of both the administrative and municipal district.
