= Mayminsky District =

Mayminsky District Майминский район (Russian)
- District

Other transcription(s)
  - Altay: Майма аймак
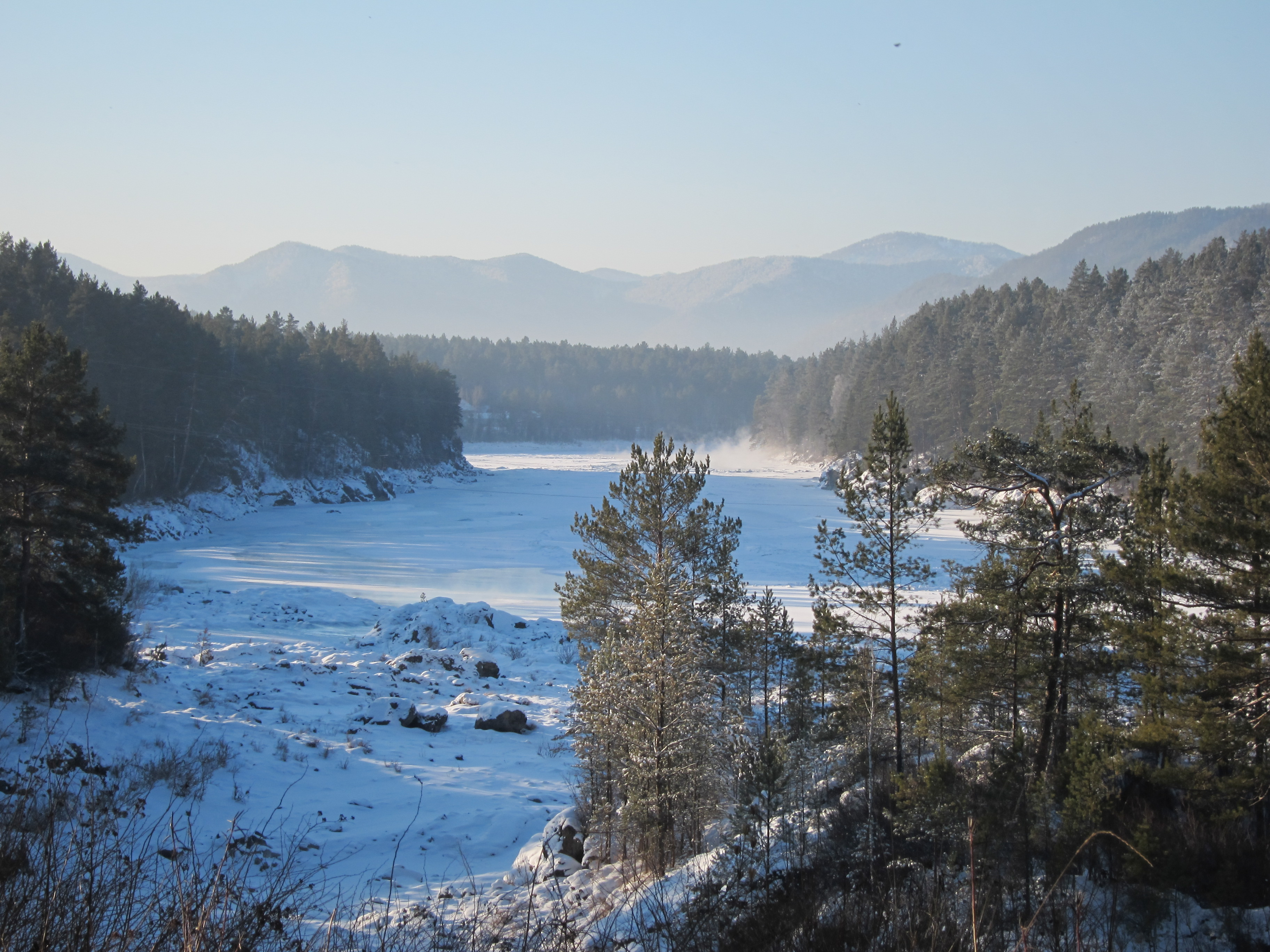
- The Katun River near the settlement of Barangol in Mayminsky District

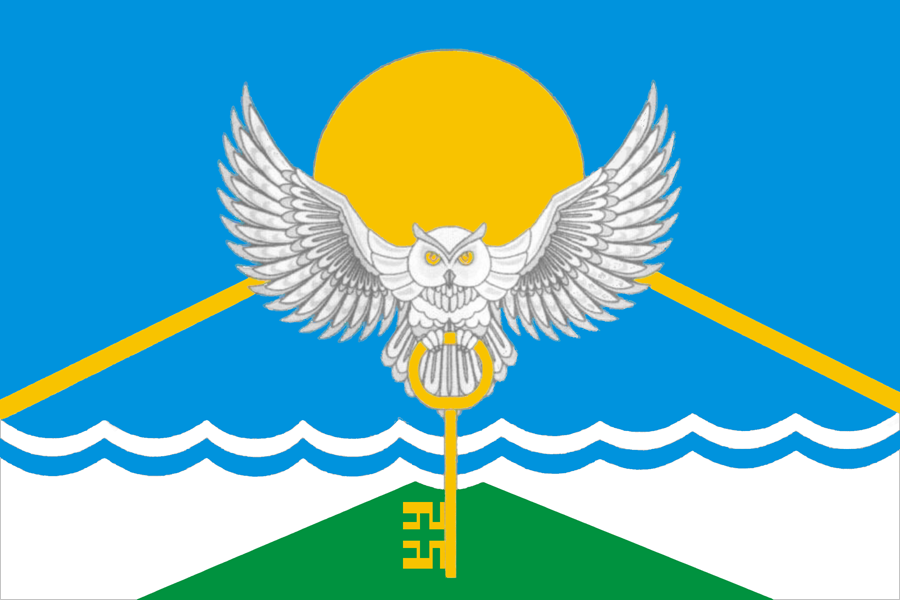
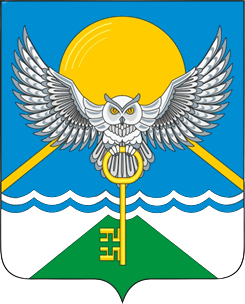
- Flag Coat of arms
- Location of Mayminsky District in the Altai Republic
- Coordinates: 52°01′N 85°55′E
- Country: Russia
- Federal subject: Altai Republic
- Established: February 15, 1938
- Administrative center: Mayma

Area
  - Total: 1,285 km^{2} (496 sq mi)

Population (2010 Census)
  - Total: 28,642
  - Density: 22.29/km^{2} (57.73/sq mi)
  - Urban: 0%
  - Rural: 100%

Administrative structure
  - Administrative divisions: 6 Rural settlements
  - Inhabited localities: 25 rural localities

Municipal structure
  - Municipally incorporated as: Mayminsky Municipal District
  - Municipal divisions: 0 urban settlements, 6 rural settlements
- Time zone: UTC+6 (MSK+3)
- OKTMO ID: 84615000
- Website: http://www.maima-altai.ru

Population of Mayminsky District
- 2010 Census: 28,642
- 2002 Census: 26,306
- 1989 Census: 22,396
- 1979 Census: 26,955

Mayminsky District (Russian: Ма́йминский райо́н; Altay: Майма аймак, Mayma aymak) is an administrative and municipal district (raion), one of the ten in the Altai Republic, Russia. It is located in the northwest of the republic. The area of the district is 1,285 square kilometers (496 sq mi). Its administrative center is the rural locality (a selo) of Mayma. As of the 2010 Census, the total population of the district was 28,642, with the population of Mayma accounting for 56.5% of that number.

== History ==
The district was established on February 15, 1938.

== Administrative and municipal status ==
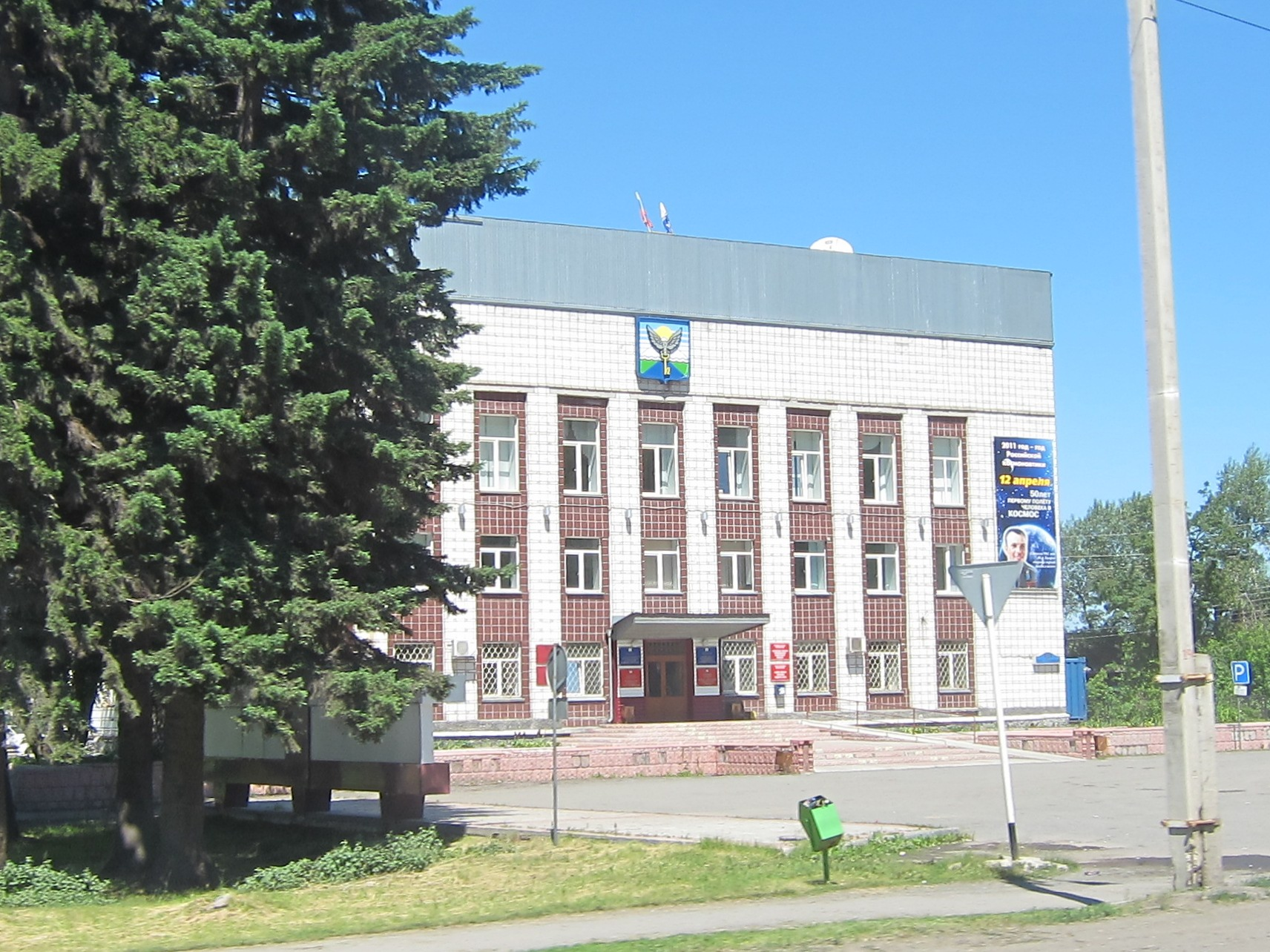
Mayminsky District Administration building

Within the framework of administrative divisions, Mayminsky District is one of the ten in the Altai Republic. As a municipal division, the district is incorporated as Mayminsky Municipal District. Both administrative and municipal districts are divided into the same six rural settlements, comprising twenty-five rural localities. The selo of Mayma serves as the administrative center of both the administrative and municipal district.

== Economy ==
The district's economy is agricultural in nature, with developed beekeeping and the cultivation of hops.
