= Mayma =

Mayma Майма
- Selo

Other transcription(s)
  - Altay: Майма
- Flag
- Interactive map of Mayma
- Location of Mayma Mayma (Altai Republic)
- Coordinates: 52°00′12″N 85°53′50″E
- Country: Russia
- Federal subject: Altai Republic
- Administrative district: Mayminsky District
- SelsovietSelsoviet: Mayminsky
- Founded: 1811

Population (2010 Census)
  - Total: 16,174
  - Estimate (2021): 16,890 (+4.4%)

Administrative status
  - Capital of: Mayminsky District, Mayminsky Selsoviet

Municipal status
  - Municipal district: Mayminsky Municipal District
  - Rural settlement: Mayminskoye Rural Settlement
  - Capital of: Mayminsky Municipal District, Mayminskoye Rural Settlement
- Time zone: UTC+6 (MSK+3)
- Postal code: 649100
- OKTMO ID: 84615430101

Mayma (Russian: Майма́, Altay: Майма) is a rural locality (a selo) and the administrative center of Mayminsky District of the Altai Republic, Russia. Population: 16,174 (2010 census); 15,344 (2002 census); 12,856 (1989 Soviet census).
