= Bekovo =

Bekovo (Russian: Беково) is the name of several inhabited localities in Russia.

Urban localities

- Bekovo, Penza Oblast, a work settlement in Bekovsky District of Penza Oblast

Rural localities

- Bekovo, Kemerovo Oblast, a selo in Belovsky District of Kemerovo Oblast
- Bekovo, Tyumen Oblast, a selo in Sladkovsky District of Tyumen Oblast
- Bekovo, Leningrad Oblast, a village in Luzhsky District of Leningrad Oblast
