= Sosnovka, Bekovsky District, Penza Oblast =

Sosnovka Сосновка
- selo
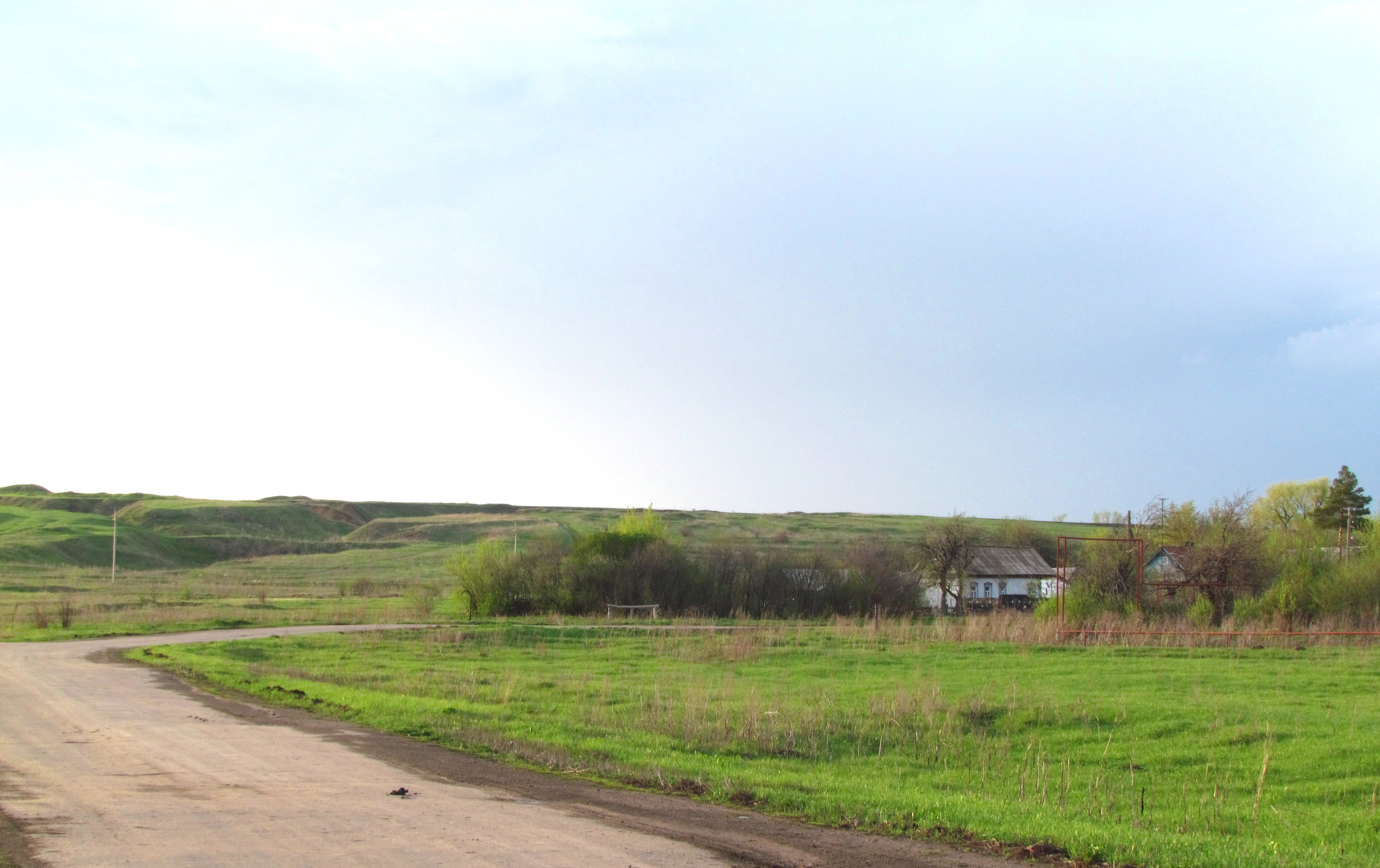
- Entrance to Sadovaya (Latyshovka) st.
- Interactive map of Sosnovka
- Location of Sosnovka Sosnovka (Penza Oblast)
- Coordinates: 52°25′04″N 43°31′31″E
- Country: Russia
- Federal subject: Penza Oblast
- Administrative district: Bekovsky District
- Selsoviet: Sosnovskiy Selsoviet
- Founded: the beginning of the 18th century
- Rural locality status since: the beginning of the 18th century

Population
  - Estimate (2014): less than 1,000 )

Administrative status
  - Capital of: Sosnovskiy Selsoviet

Municipal status
  - Municipal district: Bekovsky Municipal District
  - Rural settlement: Sosnovskiy Selsoviet
  - Capital of: Sosnovskiy Selsoviet
- Time zone: UTC+3 (MSK)
- Postal code: 442950
- Dialing code: +7 (841–41)
- OKTMO ID: 56609425101
- Website: sosnovka.bekovo.pnzreg.ru

Sosnóvka (Russian: Сосно́вка, means Piny Village) is a selo and the administrative center of Sosnovskiy Selsoviet (rural settlement "Sosnovskiy Selsoviet") of Bekovsky District in Penza Oblast, Russia.

The selo had 10 peasant (farmer) farms in 1998. It also had 580 farms and 1380 inhabitants at 1 January 2004. As of 2015 it has less than 1000 inhabitants. There are more than 700 households, many of them abandoned.

There are Vertunovskaya railway station with station-house (Open JSC Russian Railways, Pochtovaya st.), a post office (office of Federal state unitary enterprise "Russian Post", Pochtovaya st., 88), telegraph, telephone, first-aid and obstetric point, ambulance station attached to railway station, secondary school (municipal educational institution Sosnovka secondary comprehensive school, муниципальное образовательное учреждение средняя общеобразовательная школа с. Сосновка, Shkol'naya st., 1) with 132 pupils in 2015, library, five shops, railway club, a branch of Open JSC Sberbank of Russia, a monument to soldiers who perished in the Second World War. The selo also has a network gasification and centralized water supply.

Sosnovka has Vertunovskaya railway station of Tambov–Rtishchevo line of South Eastern Railway. There is also railway communication with Bekovo on Vertunovskaya–Bekovo railway branch (Bekovo branch).

Bekovo–Sosnovka–Varvarino asphalt route of a regional significance passes through the territory of Sosnovskiy Selsoviet. Asphalt road of 600 meters (2,000 ft) length goes to the selo.

Sosnovskiy Selsoviet administration is located in Sosnovka at: Tsentral'naya usad'ba ("Central farmstead") st., 6, s. Sosnovka, Bekovsky District, Penza Oblast, Russia, 442950 (ул. Центральная усадьба, 6, с. Сосновка, Бековский район, Пензенская область, Россия, 442950). The head of Sosnovskiy Selsoviet is delegate of Committee of local self-government of Sosnovskiy Selsoviet Morozova Elena Aleksandrovna. Since 2014 the head of Sosnovskiy Selsoviet administration is Vyacheslav Anatol'yevich Markin (Russian: Вячеслав Анатольевич Маркин).

== Geography and climate ==
Sosnovka is located in South-Western part of Bekovsky District in Penza Oblast, 700 kilometers (430 mi) south-east of Moscow, 195 kilometers (121 mi) south-west of Penza (administrative center of the oblast) and 13 kilometers (8.1 mi) south-west of Bekovo (administrative center of the district) along Vertunovka – Bekovo railway branch.

The selo is located in the Western part of the Volga Upland, in the zone forest steppe terrestrial ecosystem, in the first agroclimatic area of the oblast, which is characterized by enough moistening at hydrothermic coefficient 1.0 – 1.1. The natural vegetation: forests, meadow drains, bushes, swamp vegetation.

The climate is temperate-continental at an average temperature +20 °C of June, and −12 °C of January.

The selo is located in the Khopyor River basin. The distance to the Khopyor is 2 kilometers (1.2 mi). To the east of the selo the Mitkirey River flows from the North to the South. The Sosnovochka River (means Small Piny River) flows through the selo from the West to the East. Both rivers are tributaries of the Khopyor.

== History ==
There are a Bronze Age matted burial mound height 2.5 meters (8 ft 2 in) in 1.5 kilometers (0.93 mi) to the West from the selo; and a Bronze Age ploughed up burial ground of three mounds in 3 kilometers (1.9 mi) South-West from the selo.

According to local legend, the name of the selo came from a large lake surrounded by pine trees. Definitely one can only say this is area of pinewoods.

=== 18th century (Russian Empire) ===
Three settlements were founded on the place of present-day selo in the early to the middle of the 18th century, before 1721:

- selo Rozhdestvenskoye (Russian: село Рождественское, "Christmas Village"), or Sosnovka (Russian: Сосновка, "Piny Village"), founded by landlord colonel (polkovnik) prince (knyaz) Fyodor Grigor'yevich Tyufyakin (Russian: Фёдор Григорьевич Тюфякин); 84 "census souls" were in 1747
- sel`tso Rozhdestvenskoye (Russian: сельцо Рождественское), or Mitkirey (Russian: Миткирей), founded by landlord prime-major of the 1st Moscow Regiment Pyotr Grigog'evich Plemyannikov (Russian: Пётр Григорьевич Племянников); 88 "census souls" were in 1747
- sel`tso Rozhdestvenskoye, or Sosnovka, or Mitkirey, founded by Cathedral of the Annunciation, Moscow; 288 "census souls" were in 1747.

Peasants came from Nizhny Lomov, Penza, Shatsk, Moscow, Saransk, Yaroslavl, Simbirsk districts (uyezds). 460 "census souls" were in 1747 in all. In 1747 these three settlements were in Zaval'niy stan of Penza District (Uyezd).

In 1780 these settlements were included in Serdobsk District (Uyezd) of Saratov Governorate (Guberniya). It was a rich trade place.

According to the map of General Land Surveying of 1790 Two settlements were situated on this place in the late of the 18th century:

- selo Rozhdestvenskoye, or Vlasovka; it was a mistake of the map-maker, correctly is Sosnovka
- selo Troitskoye (Russian: село Троицкое, "Trinity Village"), or Sosnovka

In 1795 selo Troitskoye, or Sosnovka consisted of three parts:

- estates of economic peasants 181 farmsteads, 758 "census souls"
- estate of lieutenant (poruchik) Ivan Andreyevich and Guards ensign (praporshchik) Nikonor Andreyevich, princes Divletkildeyevy, 42 farmsteads, 152 "census souls"
- estate prince (knyaz) of Sergey Fyodorovich Golitzyn, 17 farmsteads, 89 "census souls".

=== From 19th century to 1917 (Russian Empire) ===
In 1811 one part of the selo was inhabited by state peasants (677 "census souls"), another part by praedial serf of general-major Sergey Fyodorovich Golitzyn (89 "census souls" on 586 desyatinas and of princes Ivan Andreyevich и Nikonor Andreyevich Divletkildeyevy (152 "census souls" on 1219 desyatinas).

Prior to the Abolition of Serfdom (1861) one part of selo Troitskoye belonged to prince N. N. Divlet-Kil'deyev. There were 105 "census souls" of peasants, 8 "census souls" of house-serfs, 31 ½ impost units, tyaglo (in corvee labour). Peasants used 23 farmsteads on 12,6 desyatinas of farm land, 255,8 desyatinas of ploughed fields, 29 desyatinas of hayfields. Landlord had 304 desyatinas useful land, including 152,4 desyatinas of forest and bushes. In 1859 there were fair and market. At Eastertide people saluted with gun by tradition.

After Abolition of Serfdom former landlord's peasants redeemed the land.

Up to collectivization (1928—1937) peasant community divide into three associations ("societies"):

- the 1st of former peasants of landlord Prozorovskiy-Golitzyn
- the 2nd of former peasants of Divletkil'deyev and Artsybashev
- the 3rd of former state peasants.

By the end of the 19th century were made new streets. About 1872 was made Latyshovka street (nowadays Sadovaya, "Garden" street). According to local legend, the name of the street came from certain Latvians, who had settled on this place. Nowadays Khopyornaya (Khopyor) street was called Nakhalovka ("Impudent") st., because a certain man settled without permission ("impudently") near forest. Later it was renamed to Khopyornaya, because it is situated near the Khopyor River.

There were water and wind mills, well-developed animal husbandry, pottery and tanning industry in Bekovo region, and the waterway on the Khopyor River. Landowners and industrialists Ustinovs, who owned many lands in Bekovo region, have vast contacts in trade and industry. All that facilitated development of trade in Bekovo region and communication with other places.

In 1871 railroad and Vertunovskaya railway station were built (see below).

Since 1877 the selo had been the center of volost' of Serdobsk District (Uyezd). There was volost' administration, 376 farmsteads, one church, 5 shops, market on Fridays.

In 1903 railway lunchroom and railway club-house ("people's house") were opened. In 1911 in the selo there were 642 farmsteads, one church, schools (see below), post-and-telegraph office, market, machine and tractor station, mill and brickworks.

=== The church ===
The church was built in 1880 in the geographical center of the selo on the upland near the cemetery. It was built from pinewood The church was visible from afar. The house of priest and deacon was near the church. The church burned down in 1903. The cause of the fire is unknown. The church was built again by insurance premium in 1915 and dedicated on 27 June. The church might be destroyed in the first decades of Soviet Period.

=== Soviet Period (Soviet Russia and the Soviet Union), 1917–1991 ===
After October Revolution (1917) peasants worked at kolkhozes, brickworks and railroad. Many people worked in town Rtishchevo. In 1921 there was big fire, Bol'shaya ("Big") street had burnt down. Many houses started to be built on Latyshovka, Beryozovka ("Birch"), Nakhalovka, Bol'shaya and Soviet streets. There were an ambulance station and pharmacy. Later the ambulance station attached to the Vertunovskaya railway station was opened. About 1930–1932, a maternity hospital attached to railway ambulance station was opened. Also, there were a post office, market, mill, granary, vegetable store cellar, liquor shop, railway lunchroom and railway club-house ("people's house").

During Second World War about 1091 men were drafted to Soviet Army from Sosnovskiy Selsoviet. More than 400 of them never came back. All men, who could hold a rifle, went to the battle-front, who could hold a rifle. People went both by summons and voluntarily. The Germans bombed Liski, Balashov, outskirts of Rtishchevo and Saratov. Wounded soldier were conveyed through military area on railroad to military hospitals in Bekovo, Sakhzavod (settlement of sugar factory) and Zubrilovo (in the former estate of princes Prozorovskiy-Golitzyns).

In 1967 house of culture, office of Sosnovskiy sovkhoz (state farm; see below) and lunchroom were built; water pipe was constructed in the houses near the railway station. In 1968 the monument to the fallen warrior-fellow-villagers was erected. In 1974 rural palace of culture was opened. There was a fishing artel in the selo. The fish from the Khopyor River was supplied to state shops in the selo.

=== Schools ===
In 1911 there were parochial school and zemstvo school with two classes in the center of the selo. In 1916 in zemstvo school there were 122 pupils and 3 teachers.

Right after October Revolution (1917) a new primary school was opened. It was situated in the former house of priest and deacon. Fire-tower was situated near this place.

In Soviet Period there were three primary schools:

- in the Barskaya ("Barin's") street (in the former house of mistress of landlord Tyufyakin)
- in the center of the selo, it was the former zemstvo school
- in Zalinia, in the Pochtovaya ("Postal") street, it was attached to railway organization.

In 1930 primary/secondary school was opened in Zalinia, it had with 7 grades and called school of peasant youths. It was situated in two former buildings of landlord Smirnov. Later the third building was made. Pupils were also from all of the local primary schools: from the settlements Kryukovka, Vlasovka, Malyonovka, Podsot, Sennoy Ovrag ("Hay Ravine"), Pervoye and Vtoroye Otdeleniye (settlements of the First and the Second branches of Sosnovskiy sovkhoz) – there were many children.

Children of the selo also learned in the secondary school of Sakhzavod, opened in 1955. After Second World War shortage of labour was, and women were called to renew destroyed equipment. Therefore, nursery and kindergartens was opened. The nursery was opened in 1948 and was attached to selsoviet. It was situated in private house in the Bol'shaya street. To 1956 building for nursery was made. In 1967 nursery-kindergarten attached to Sosnovskiy sovkhoz was opened. About 1970s nursery-kindergarten No. 120 was opened, it was attached to railway station and situated in the building of the former school No. 86 attached to railway organization.

=== Kolkhozes and Sovkhoz "Sosnovskiy" ===
In 1923 some inhabitants were to resettled to khutor (hamlet) near the forest, where distillery of Smirnov was situated. Khutor was named Krasnyy ("Red"). It was a lot of vacant lands, therefore farming artel' "Krasnyy Khutor" was established. Farming artel' was organized by twenty-five-thousander Nikolay Vasil'yevich Lizunkov. In 1929 the artel' got a first tractor Fordson. In 1930 was established large Kolkhoz of Kalinin, including Sosnovka and village Sennoy Ovrag. Chairman of the kolkhoz was twenty-five-thousander I. D. Kalinkin. Since 1955 Sosnovka became a central farmstead of Kalinin Kolkhoz. Later the Kolkhoz of Voroshilov and Kolkhoz "Pobeda" ("Victory") were established; they included some settlement: Malyonovka, Podsot, Vlasovka, Soglasovka, Kryukovka. Kolkhozes existed up to 1959. Kolkhozes included farms. One of the farms was situated between Big st. and Kuznechnaya ("Blacksmith's") st. near the dairy point.

In February 1960 kolkhozes were united in Sovkhoz "Sosnovskiy". In 1967 the building of mechanized thrashing floor and warehouses at Tsentral'naya usad'ba ("Central farmstead") st. Since 1972 Sosnovka became a central farmstead of the sovkhoz. Sovkhoz specialize in production of grain, meat, milk and sugar beet. There were separator point, power-saw bench, forge workshop and repair workshop of agricultural machinery.

=== Railroad ===
In 1871 railway line Umyot – Atkarsk and Vertunovskaya railway station were built (the name Vertunovskaya is from neighbour selo Vertunovka). Vertunovskaya station were included in Ryazan-Ural Railway. Towards 1881 the railway station was state. In January, 1892 года government give the railroad to private company. Large company Joint-Stock Company of Ryazan-Ural Railway was found. The railroad contributed to the development of Sosnovka.

Sosnovka—Bekovo (Vertunovskaya-Bekovo) railway branch was built by industrialists Ustinovs. It was put in operation in 1874. Bekovo branch was the first in Russia, which was built at private expense. Ministry of Finance and Ministry of Communications couldn't decide, to give license for the building or no. The license was received on 22 February 1874, but by that time the branch was already built. In early March the railway communication began. Ustinov put the branch into operation to Tambov-Saratov Railway. The branch was leased by state. Later Tambov—Saratov Railway became state, and Ryazan-Ural Railway was found. State Kozlov-Saratov line was passed to Ryazan-Ural Railway. State bought Bekovo branch for 800 thousand rubles and it was passed to Company of Ryazan-Ural Railway. When Bekovo branch was gone into operation and trade grew, including corn-trade, Bekovo became the largest trading centre in Serdobsk District (Uyezd).

After construction of the railway Sosnovka grew quickly. Large part of the population worked at construction and service of railway tracks.

After October Revolution semi-automatic block system was brought in at Vertunovskaya station, railway tracks were reconstructed. Since the sugar factory (Sakhzavod) went into operation in 1933–34, density of freight traffic grew. Railwaymen contributed greatly to victory in the Second World War (1945). Railroad engineers Aleksandr Nikitovich Shchavelev and Dmitriy Ivanovich Tarantin, who were born in Sosnovka, fell in pursuance of military missions. There was large goods traffic on railroad, but railwaymen handled a task. After the Second World War density of freight traffic grew. The number of railway tracks was increased at the station, from three to six. All-electric interlocking was introduced (it cancelled work of pointsmen) and radio communication with railroad engineers.

Population
Year	1747	1795	1811	1859	1877	1897	1911	1926	1939	1959	1979	1989	1998	2004	2009	2014
Population changes	about 920	about 2000	about 1850	1667	1578	3122	4263	4726	3697	2988	2150	1687	1574	1380	about 1000	less than 1000

== Economy ==
The villagers are busy individual farming on household plots, the service of railways and other communications, and, to a small extent, commercial agriculture and trade. There is a branch of LLC "Agricultural Company Euroservice-Bekovo" (ООО "Агрофирма Евросервис-Беково") (cattle, agriculture) in the selo. This enterprise was declared bankrupt in 2010.

== Streets ==
Official name (Translation) / People's name (Translation)

- Vokzal'naya (Railway-Station)
- Zarechnaya (Over-the-River)
- Komsomol'skaya (Komsomol)
- Leninskaya (Lenin) / Bol'shaya (Big)
- Nagornaya (Hilltop)
- Oktyabr'skaya (October) / Barskaya (Master's)
- Pervomayskaya (May-Day) / Samodurovka (Wilful-Person)
- Pochtovaya (Postal)
- Revolutsionnaya (Revolutionary) / Berezovka (Birch)
- Sadovaya (Garden) / Latyshovka (Latvians)
- Sovetskaya (Soviet)
- Khopyornaya (Khopyor) / Nakhalovka (Impudent)
- Tsentral'naya usad'ba (Central farmstead)
- Shkol'naya (School)

== Notable people ==
Vladimir Labutin was a graduate of Sosnovka secondary school, who volunteered to the battle-front of the Second World War, and repeated the feat of Alexander Matrosov: he closed embrasure of Nazi bunker by his chest.

A. P. Korneev lived and worked in Sosnovka. He was a selectionist who raised a variety of tomato named "Kornievskiy", which is widely known.

Writer and artist Ivan Fyodorovich Sedov was born and lived in Sosnovka.

== Gallery of Sosnovka and its surroundings ==
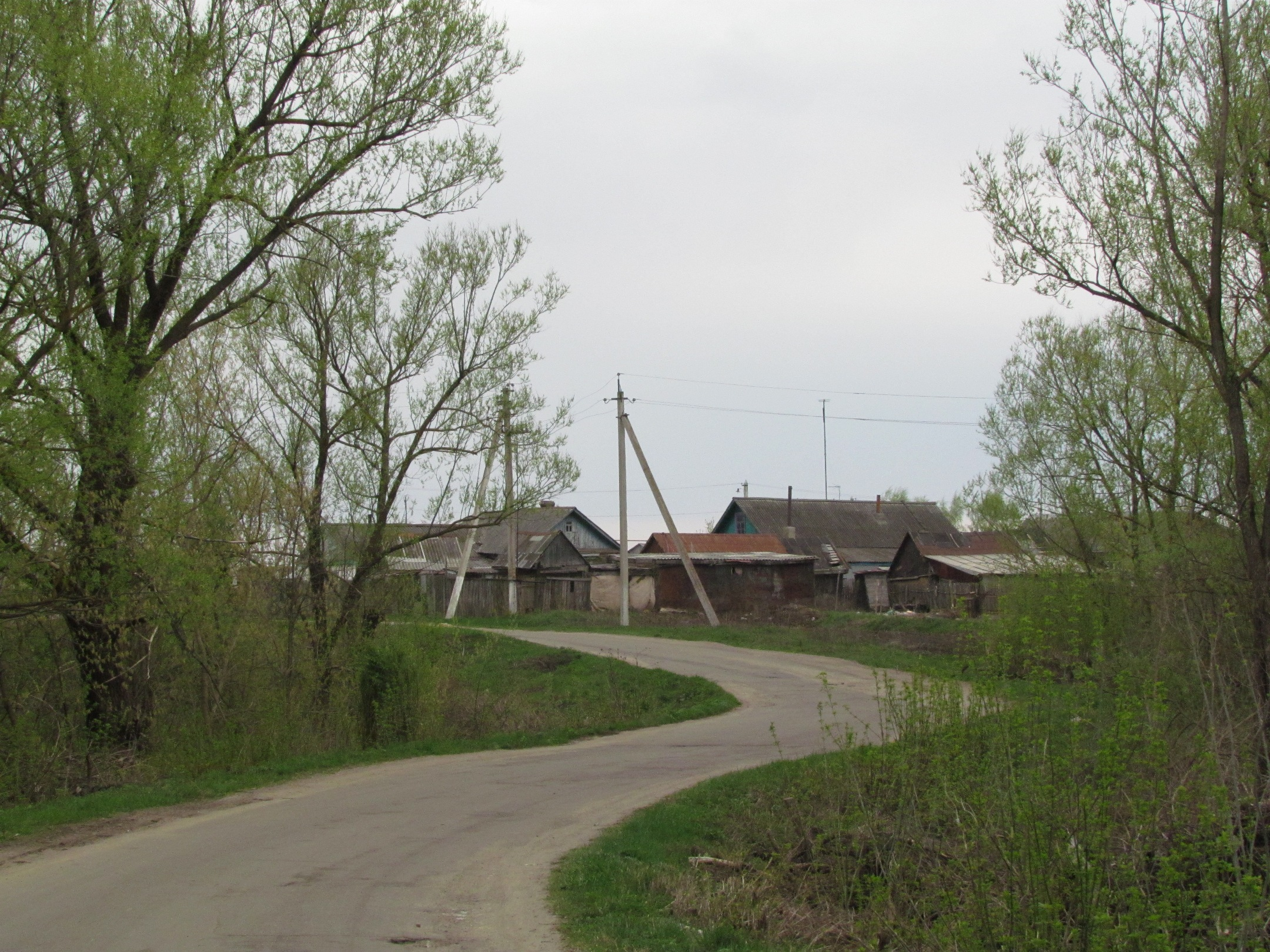
Entrance from Bekovo–Sosnovka–Varvarino route. 2015

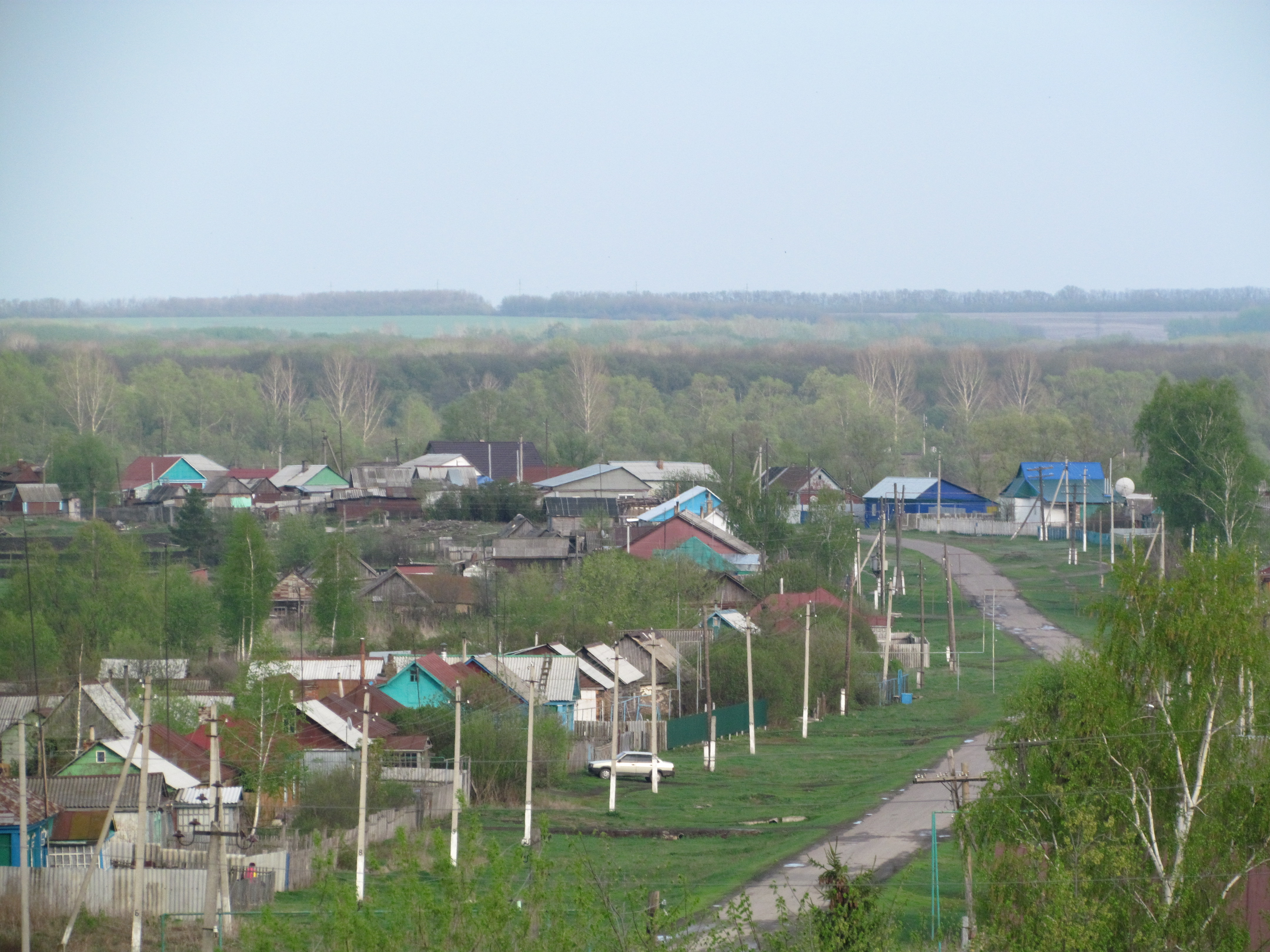
Lenin (Big) st. 2015

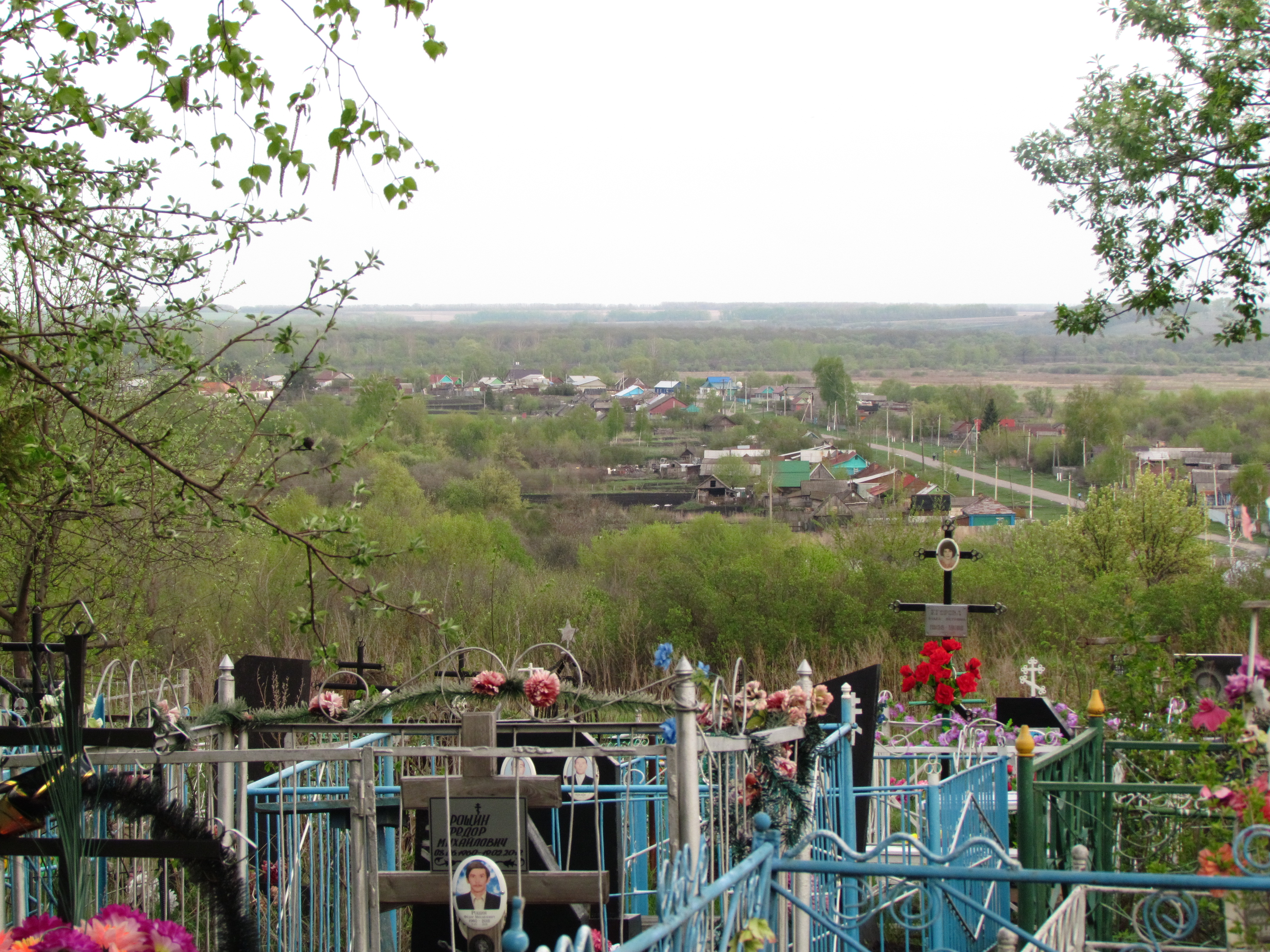
View from cemetery to Big st. 2015

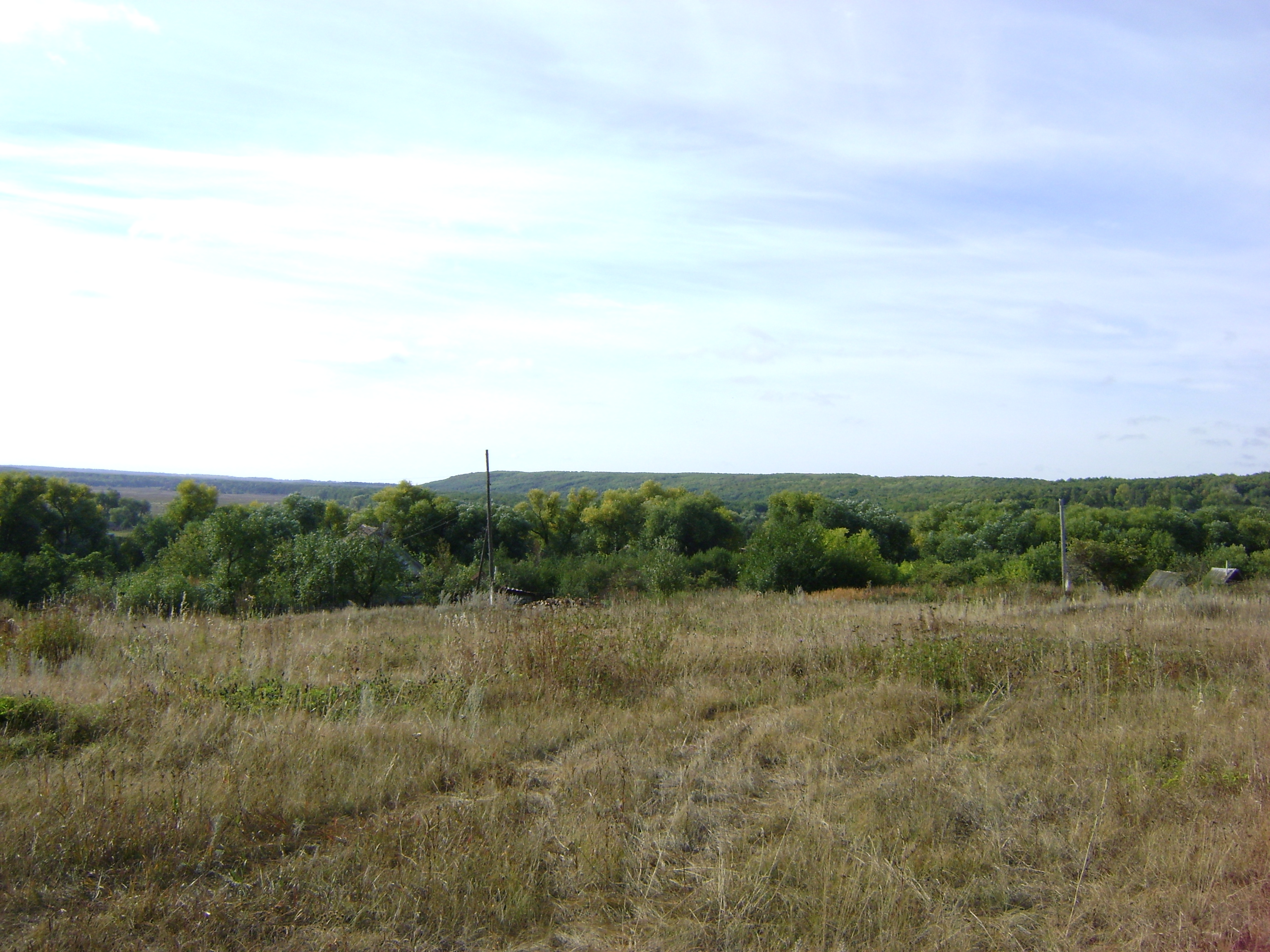
View of the flood land of the Khopyor River from the Sosnovka cemetery. 2009

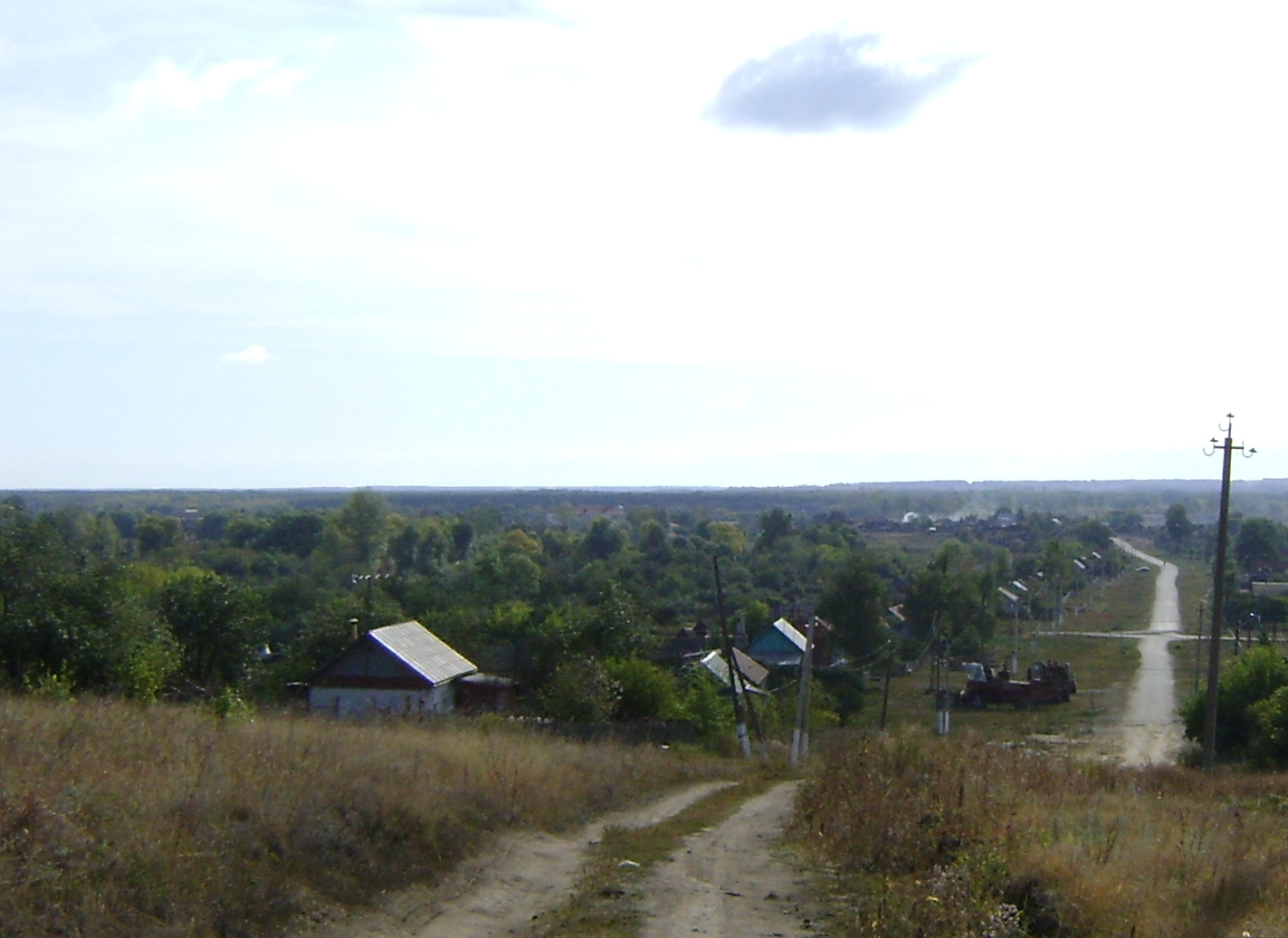
View from the hill to Big st. 2009

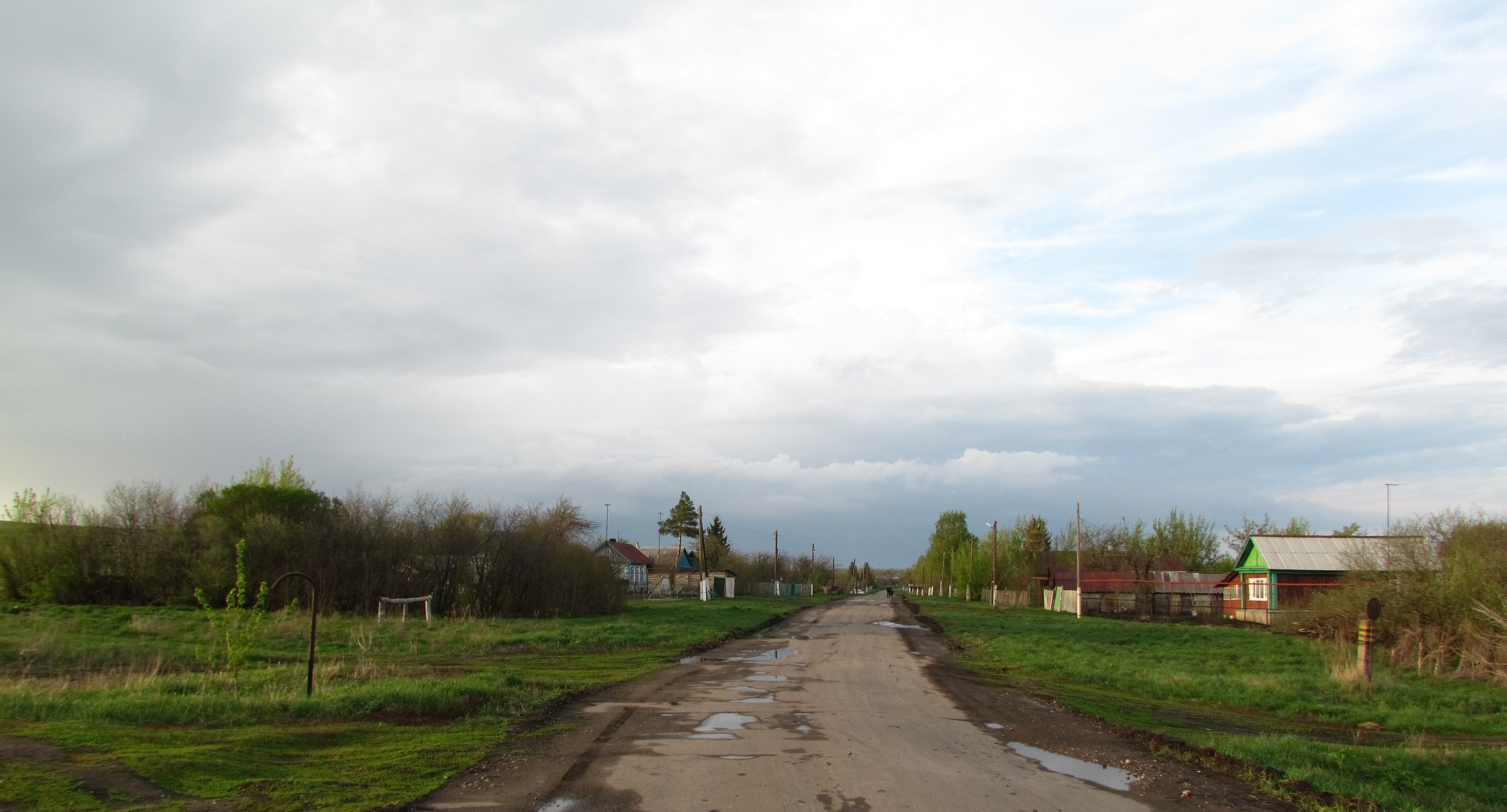
Latyshovka st. 2015

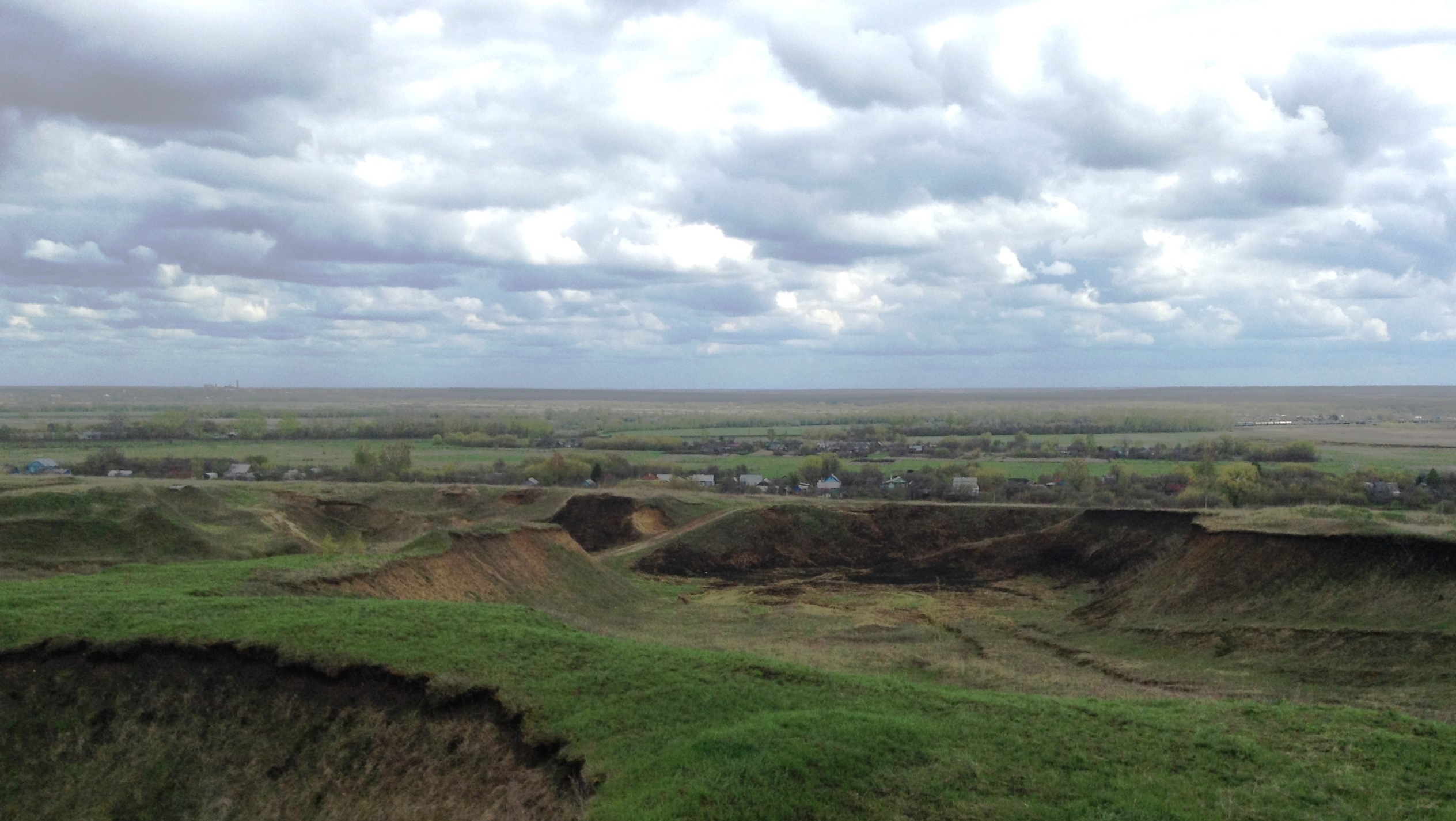
View from the abandoned quarry. 2014

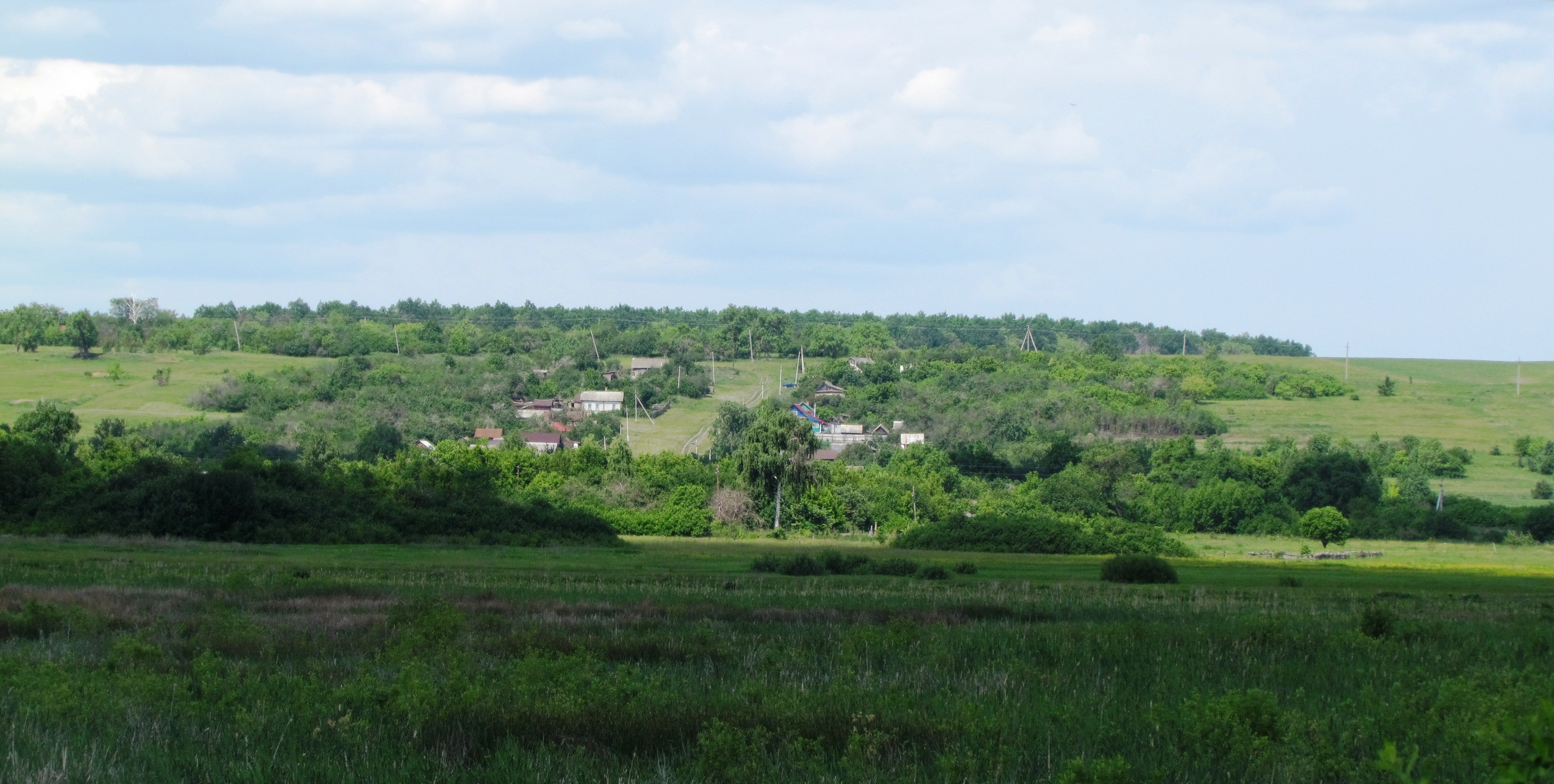
Beryozovaya st. 2015

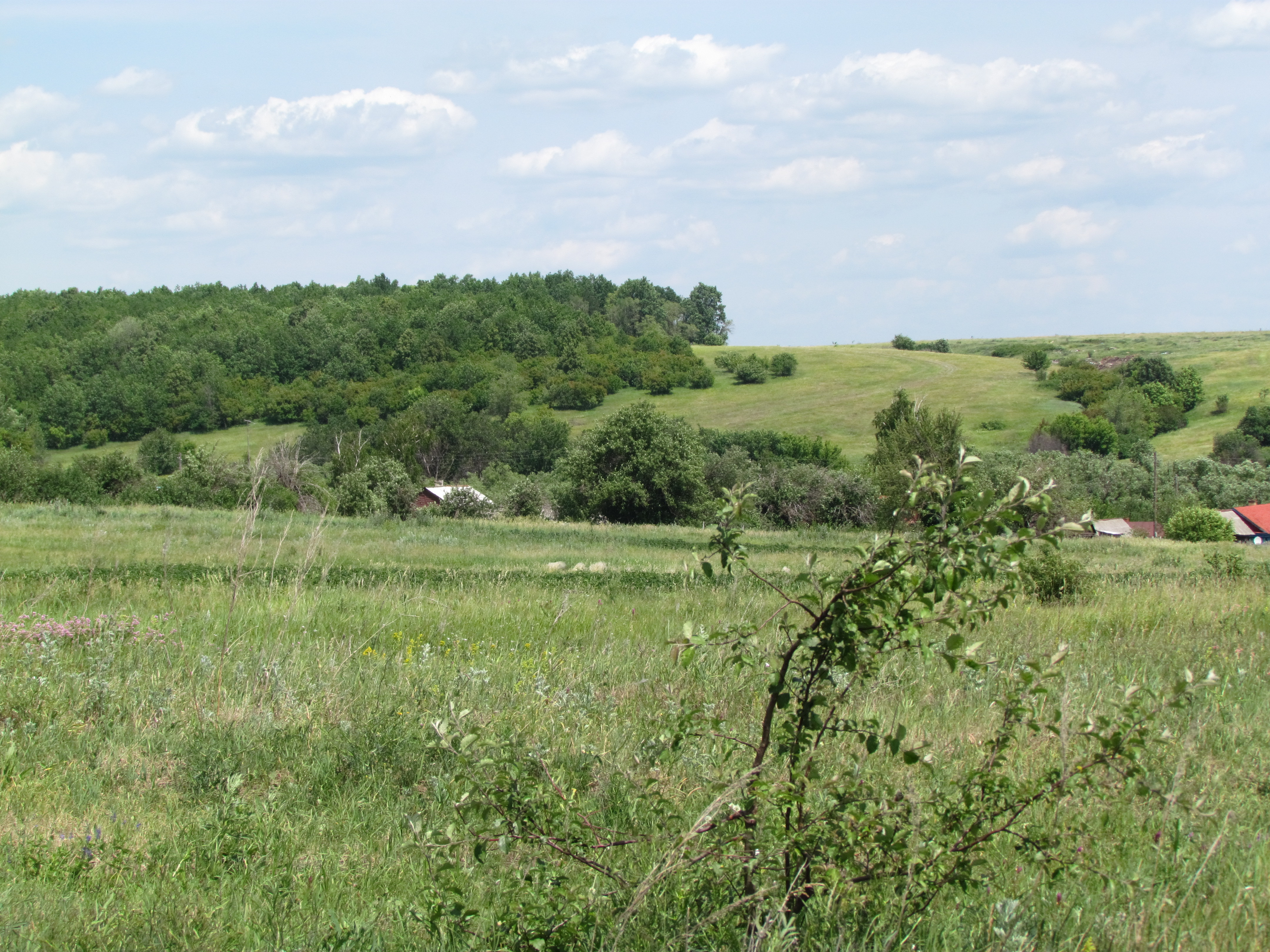
Oktyabr'skaya st. 2015

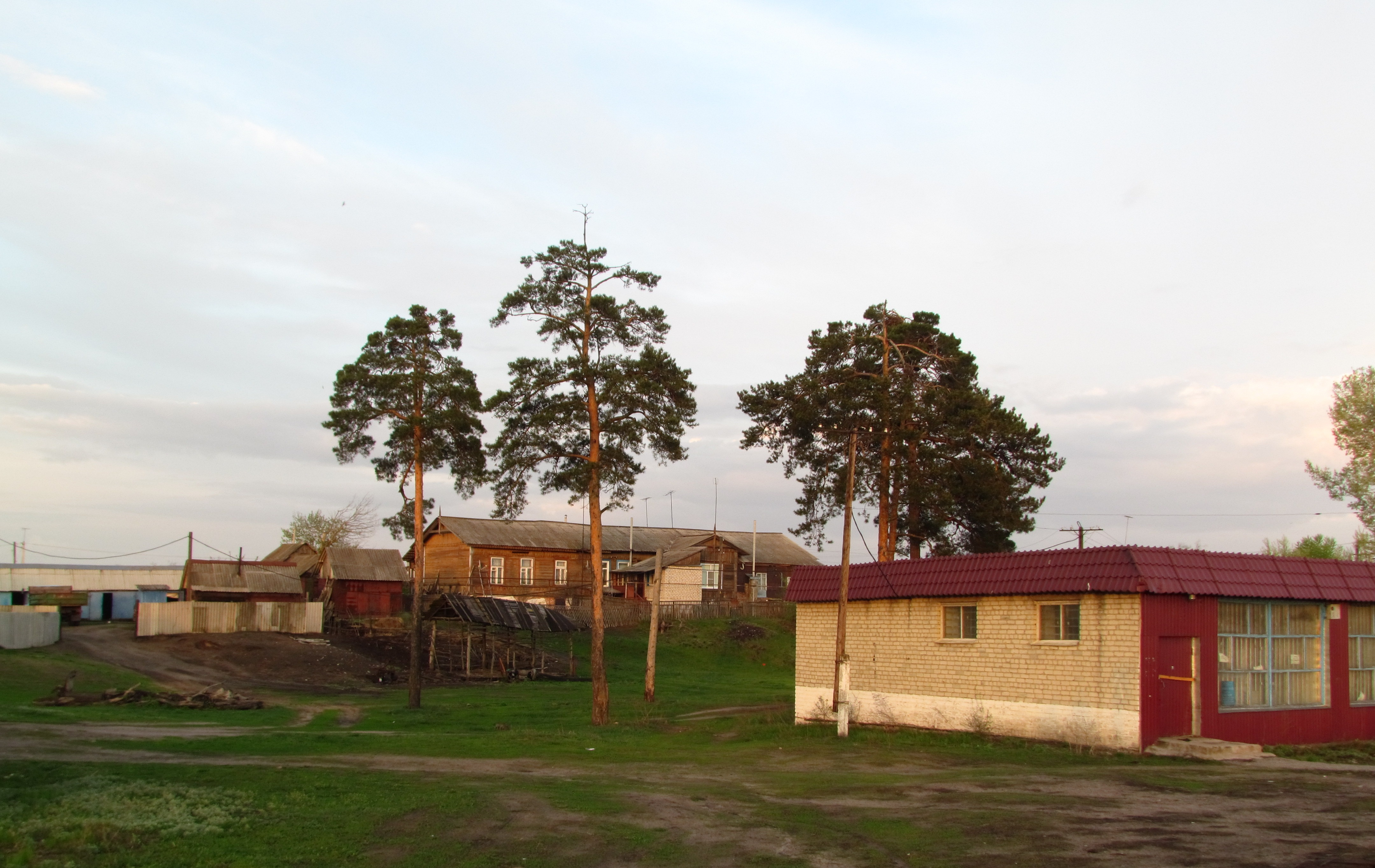
Sosny (pine trees) in Sosnovka. 2015

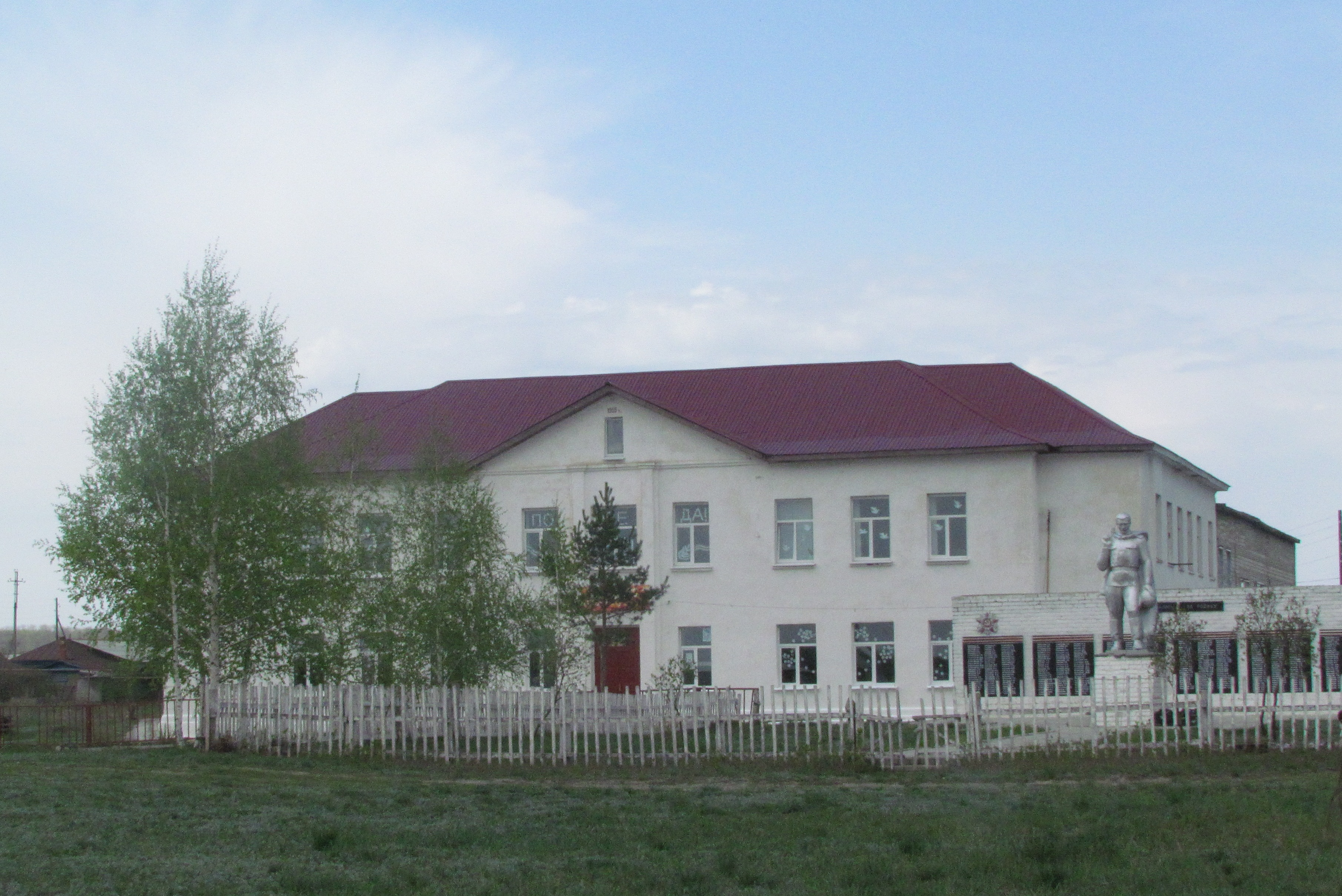
Sosnovka high school. 2015.

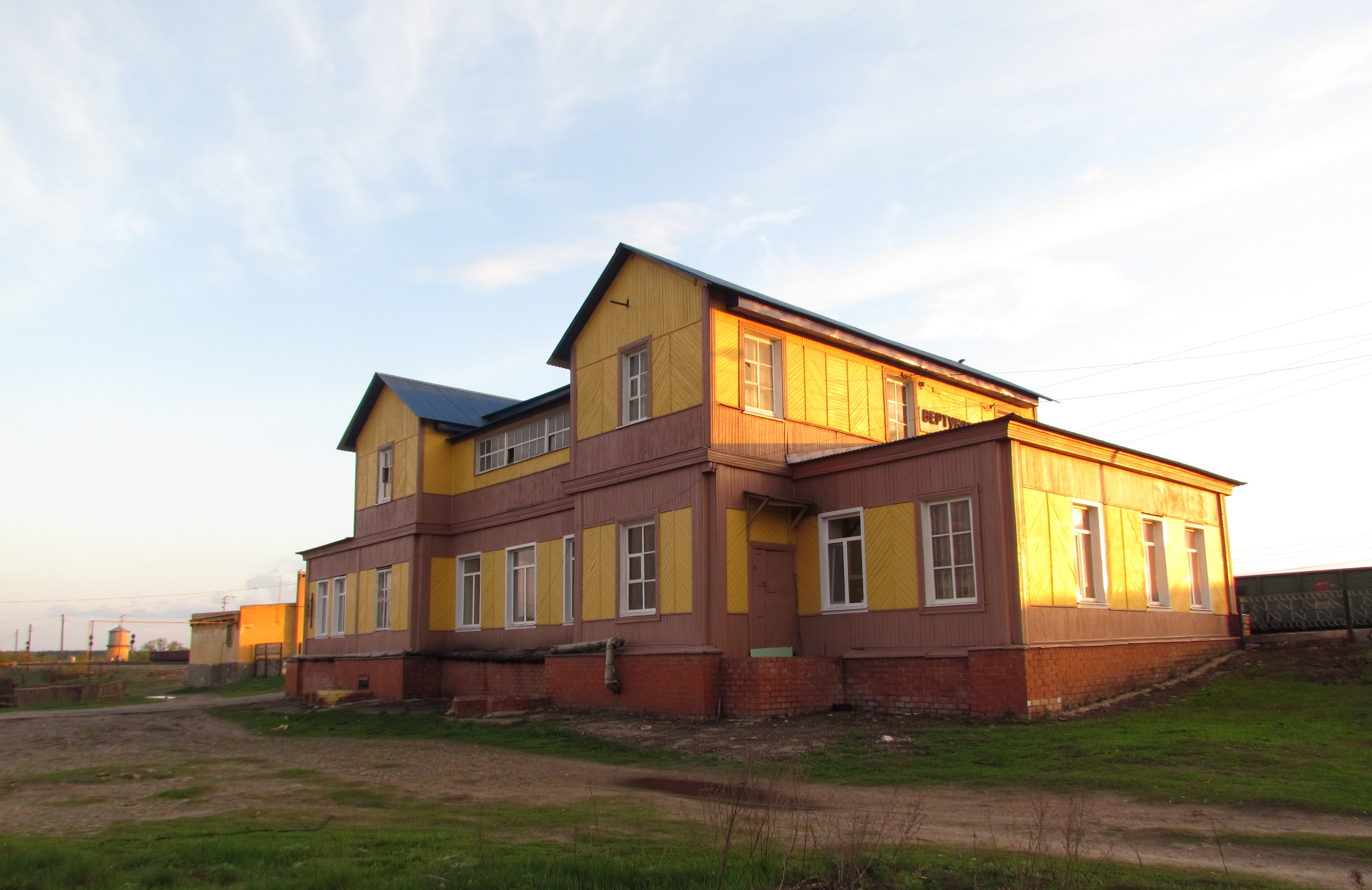
Vertunovskaya railway station. 2015.

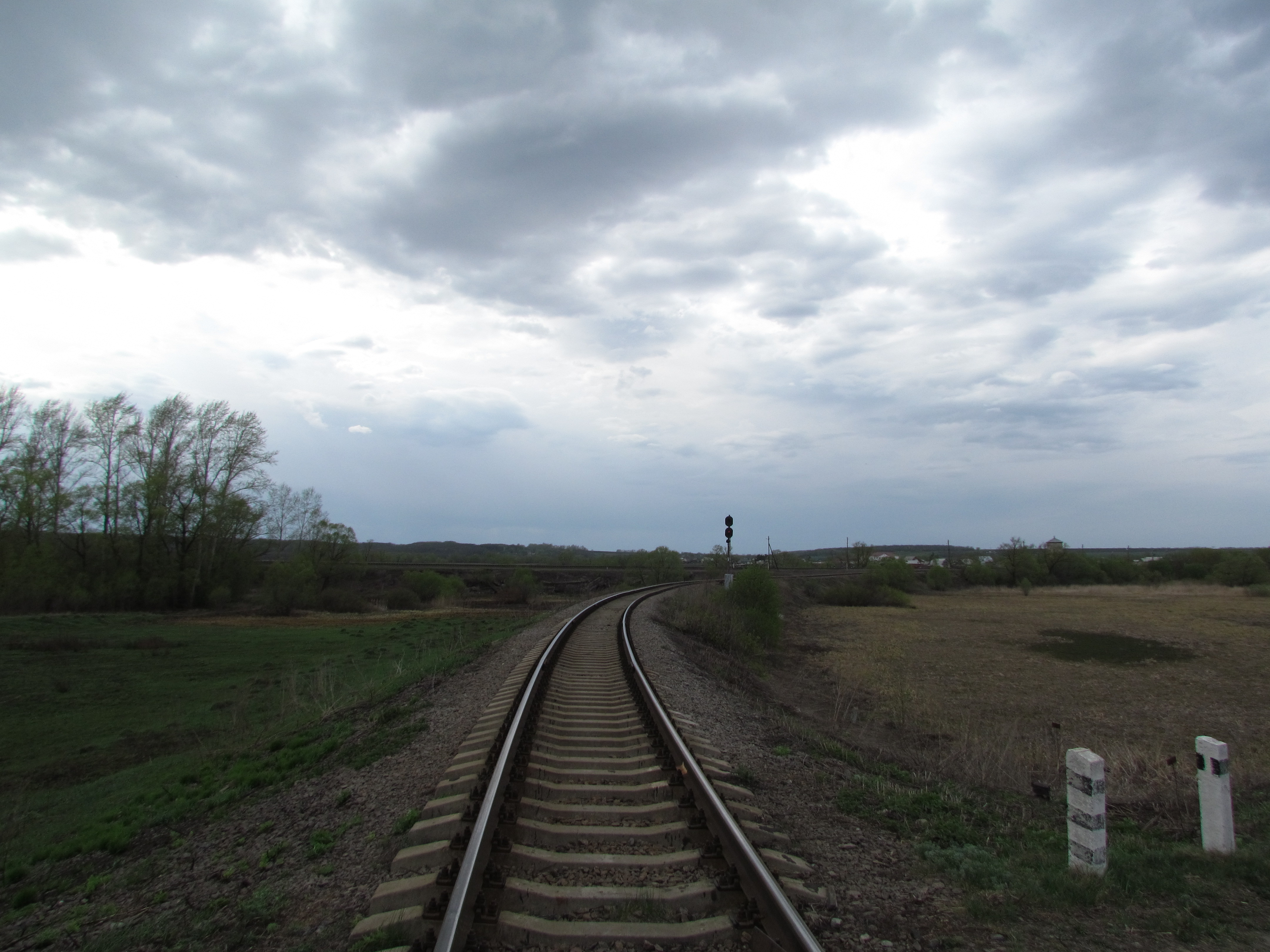
Bekovo railway branch. 2015 год

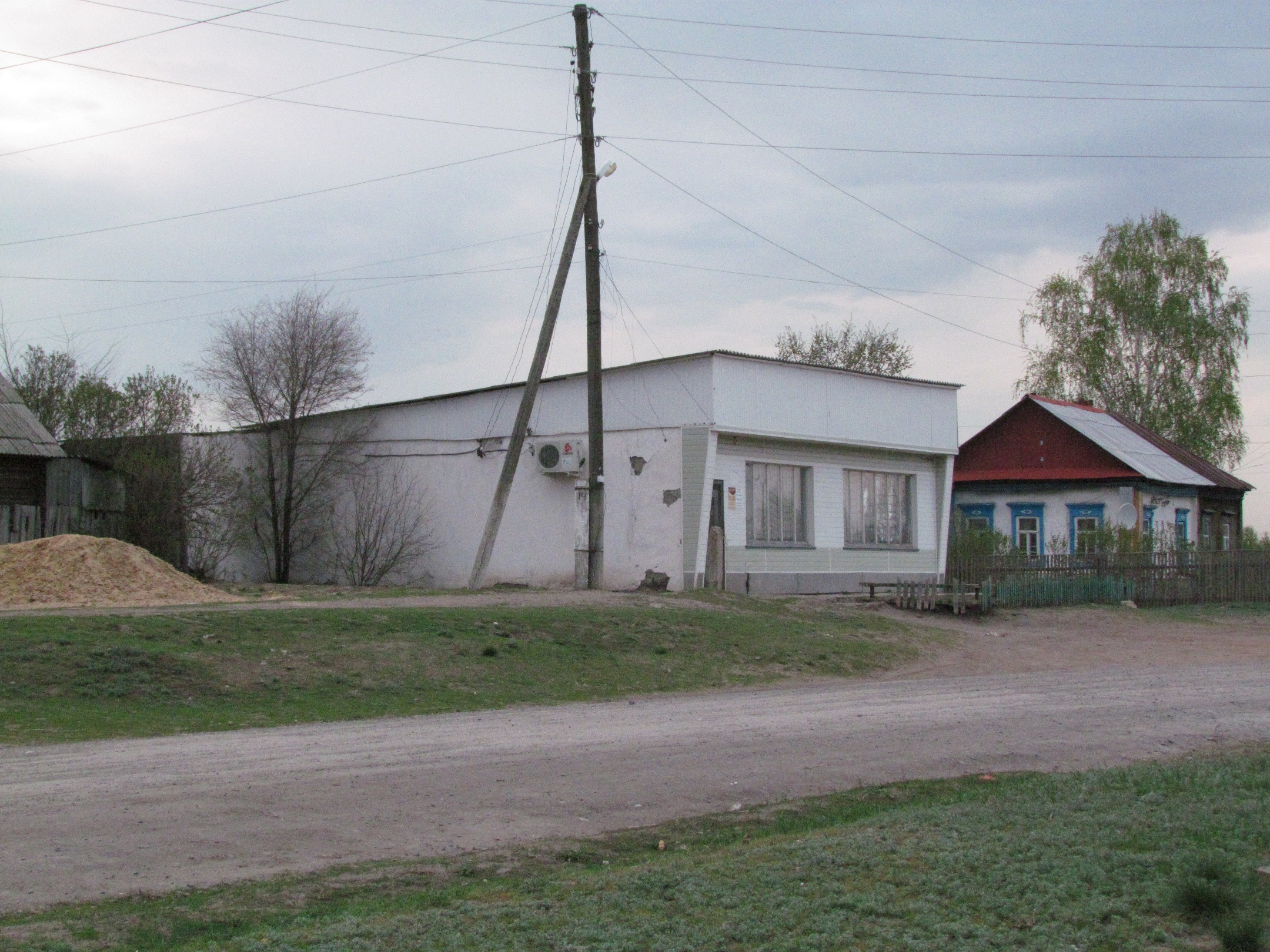
Sosnovka main shop. 2015

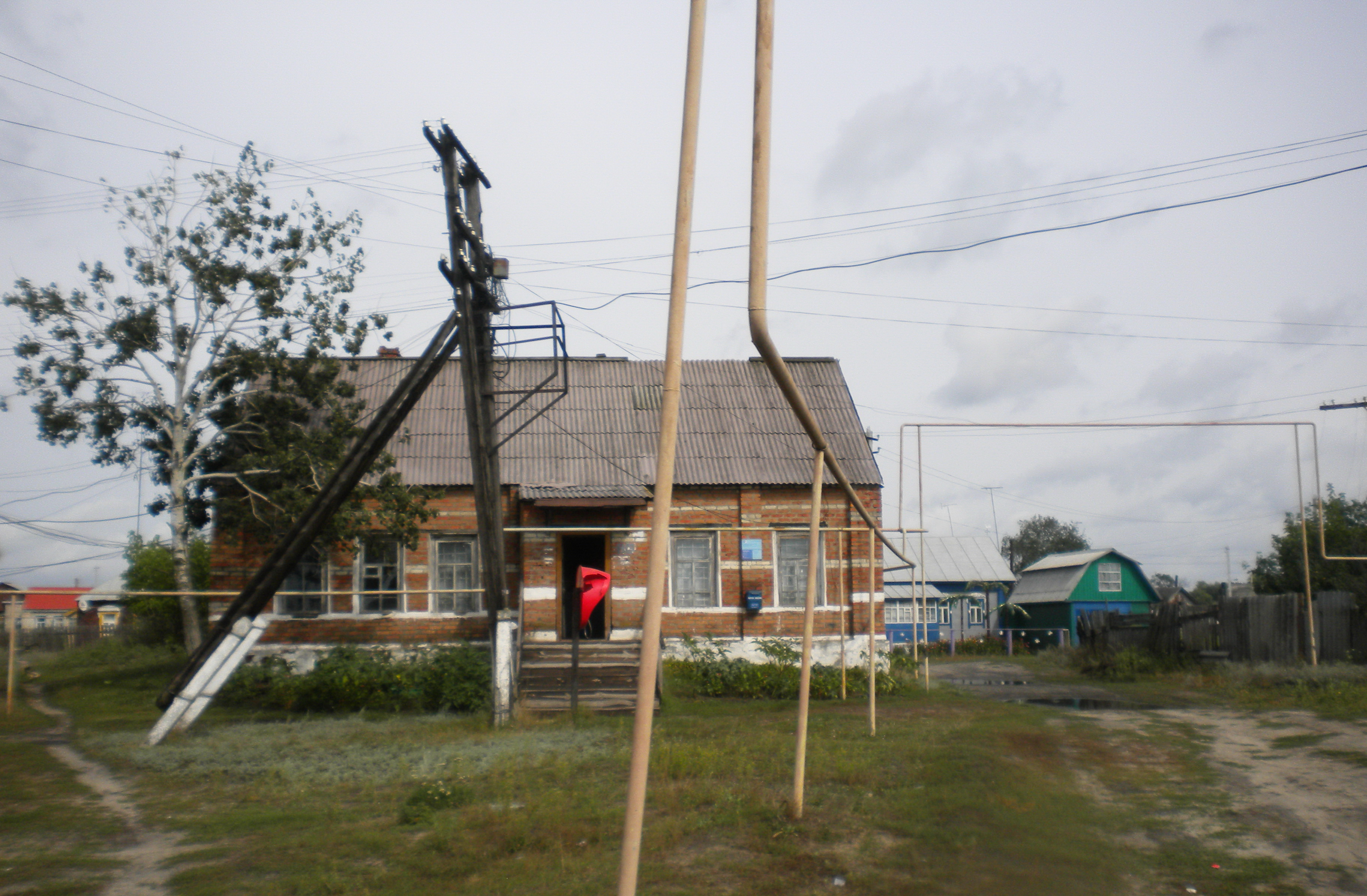
Post office. 2012

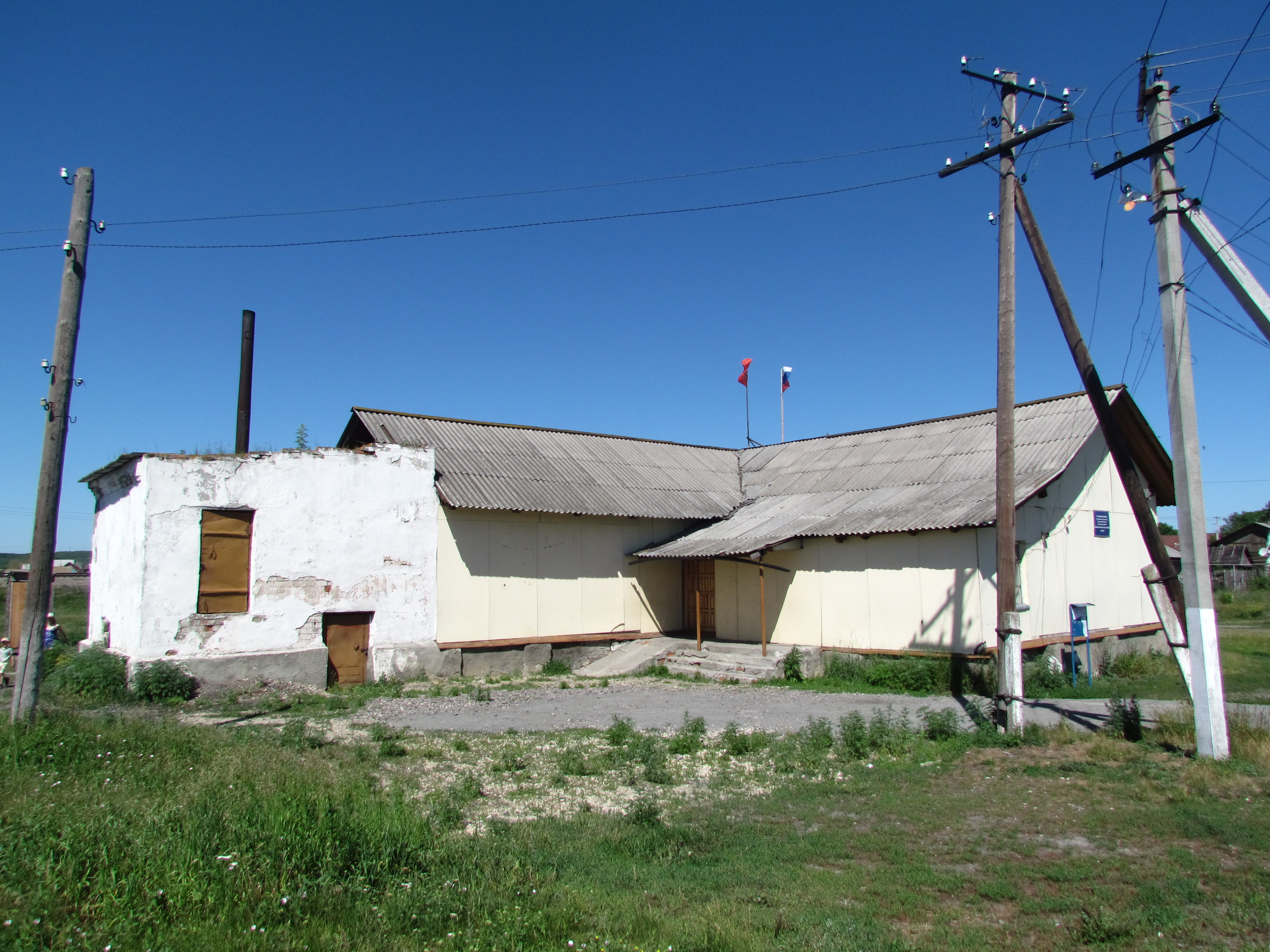
Library and Leisure Center (club-house). 2015

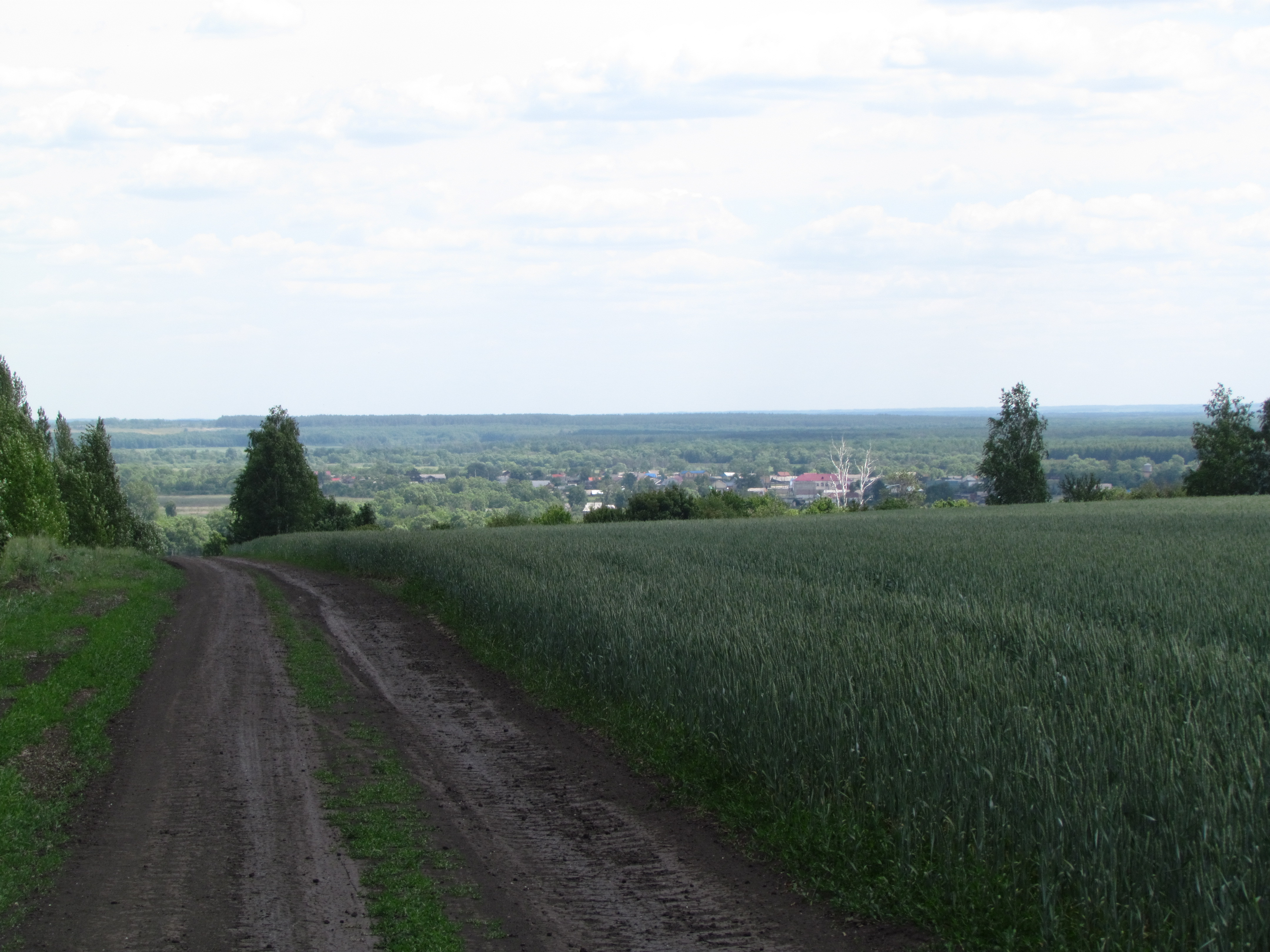
Entrance from the West. 2015

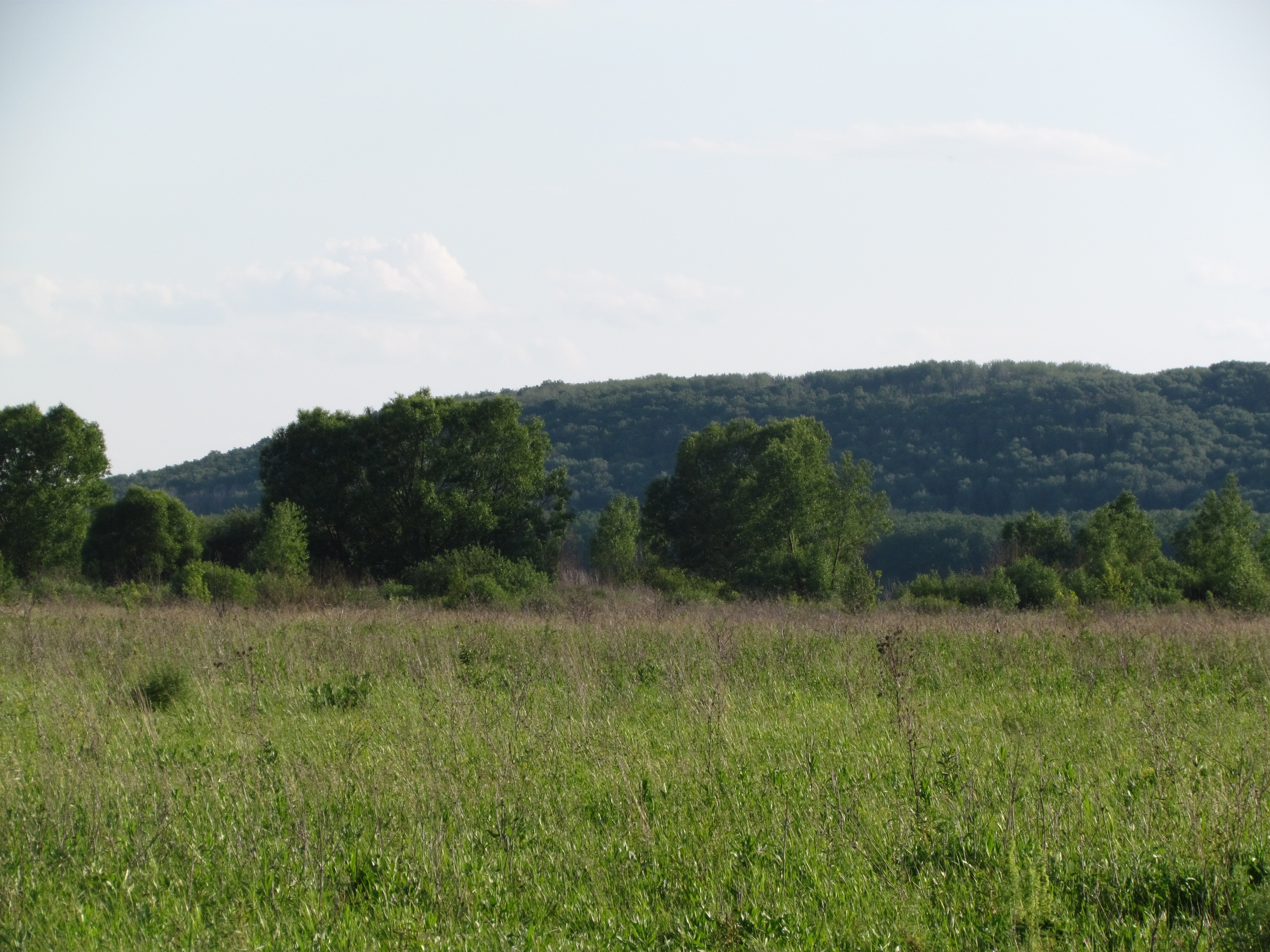
Valley of the Khopyor River. 2015

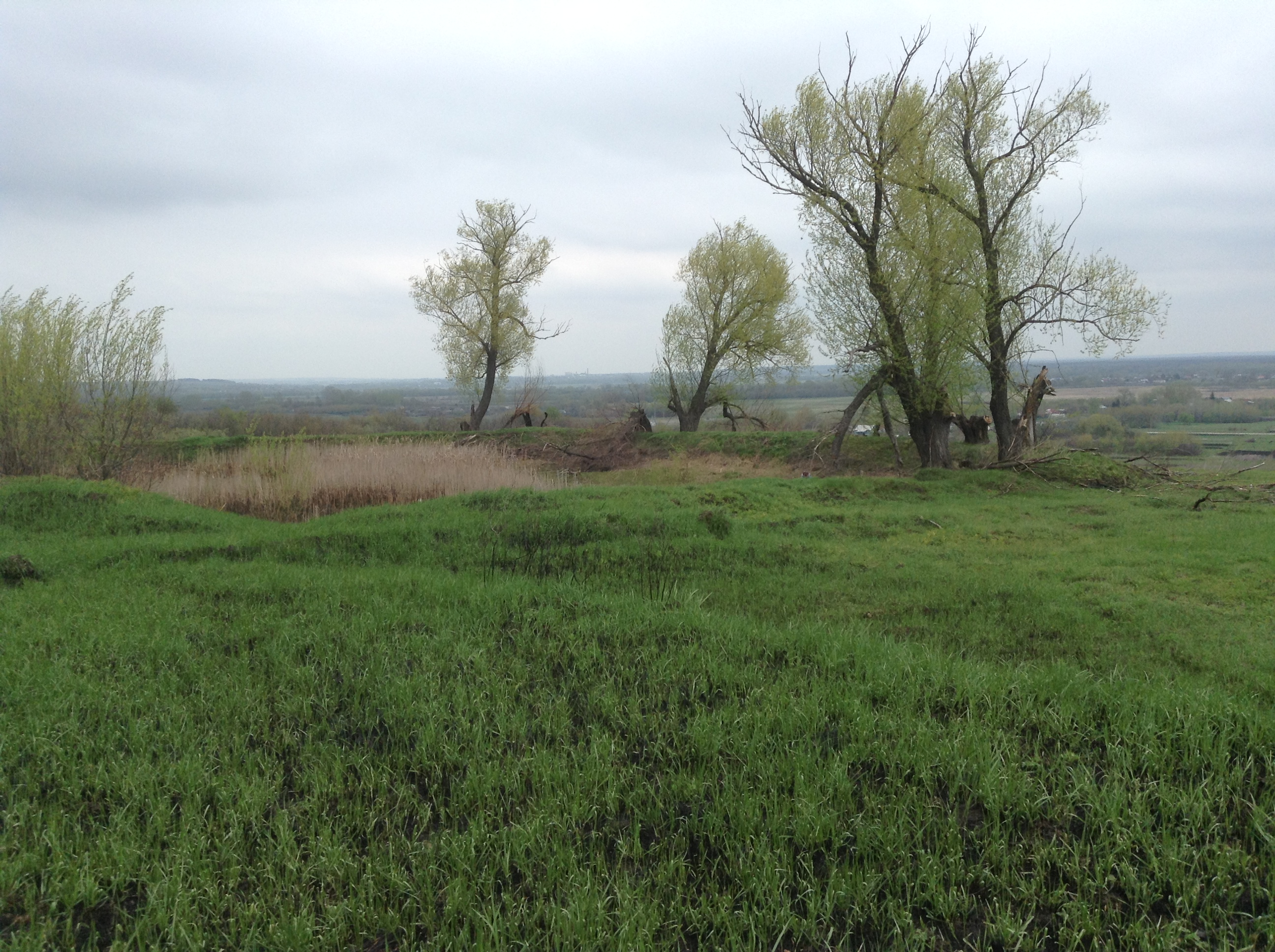
Lake near Beryozovaya st. 2014

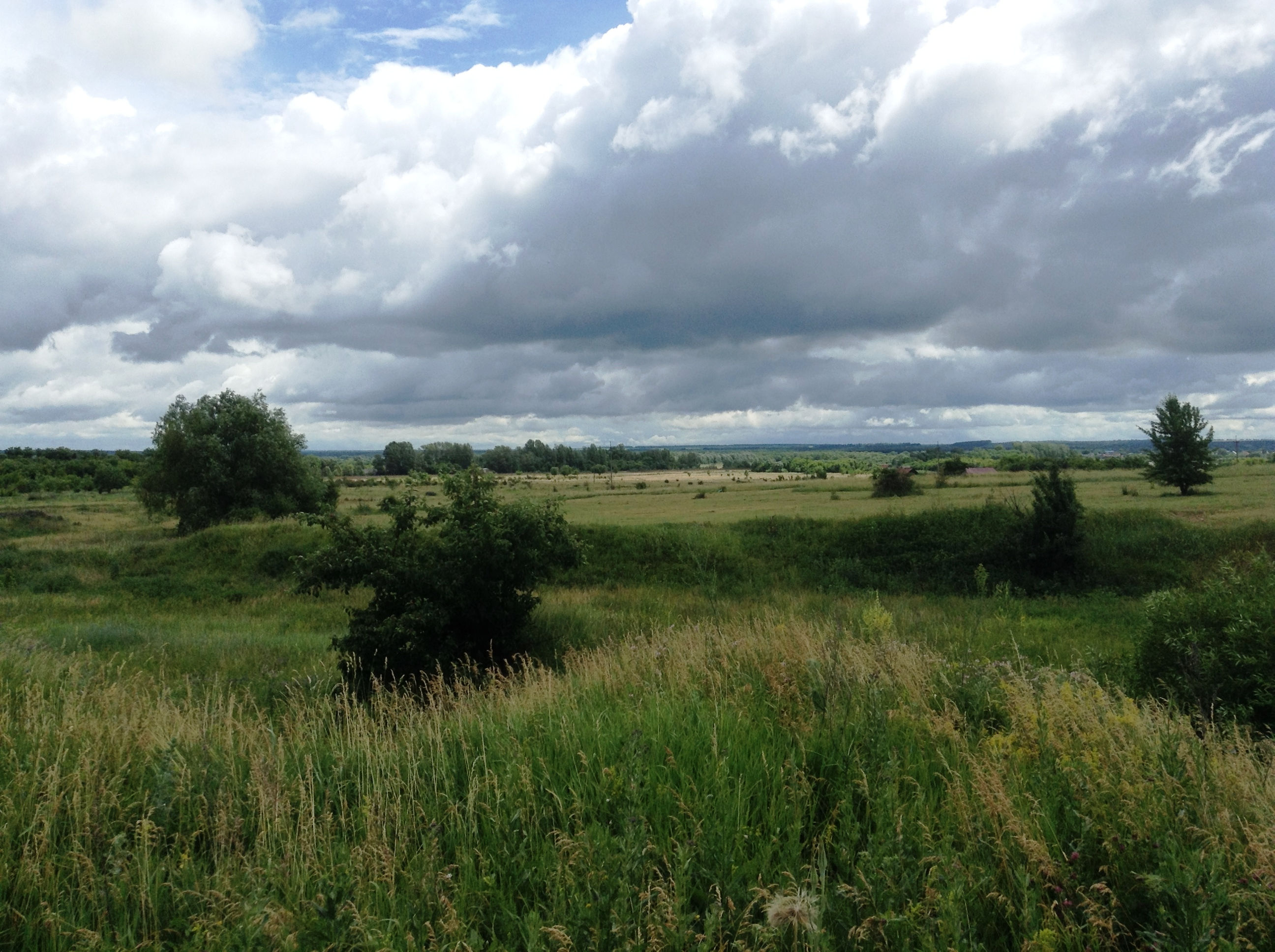
Near the Railway Crossing. 2014

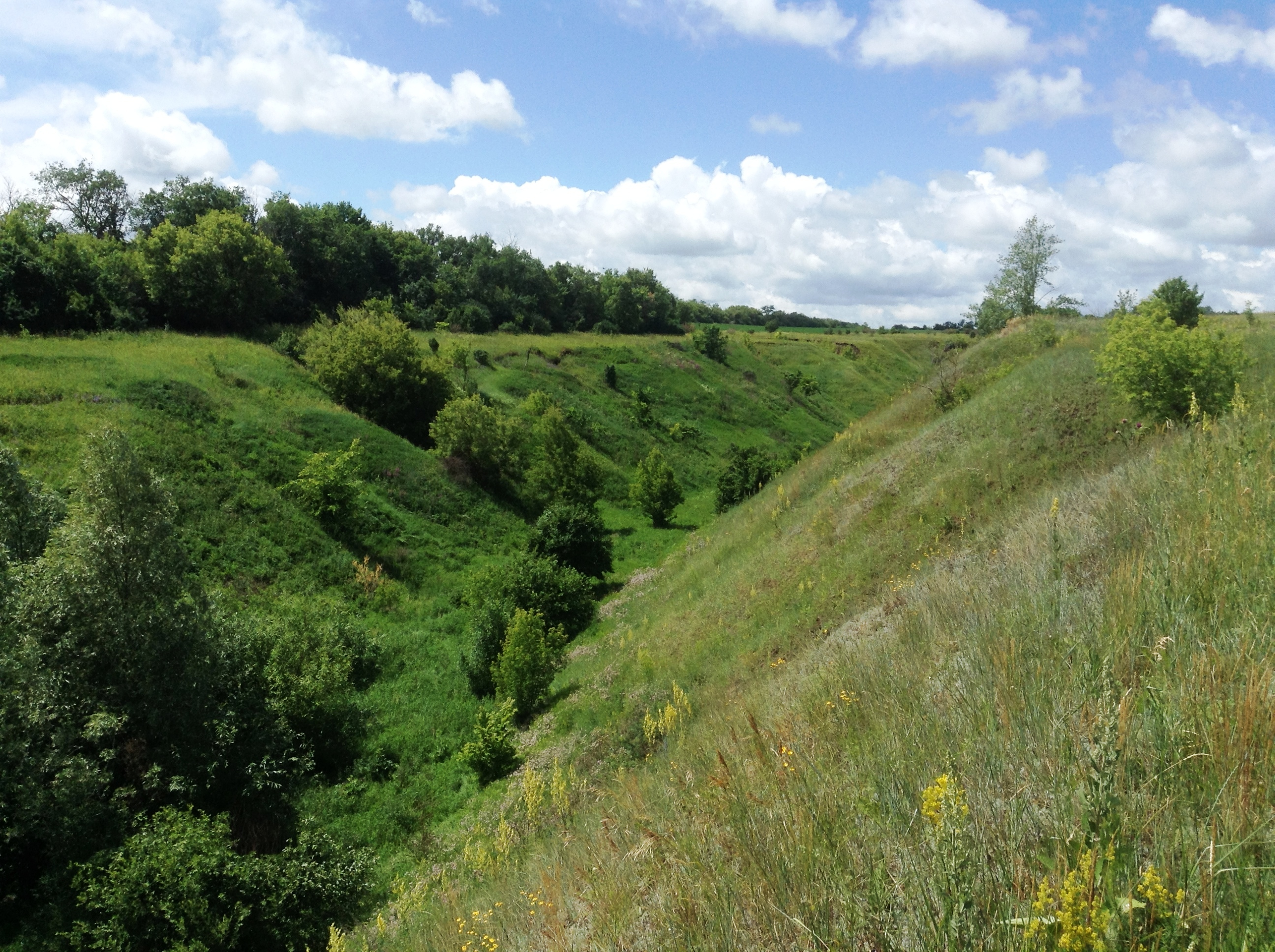
Ravine near the Railway Crossing. 2014

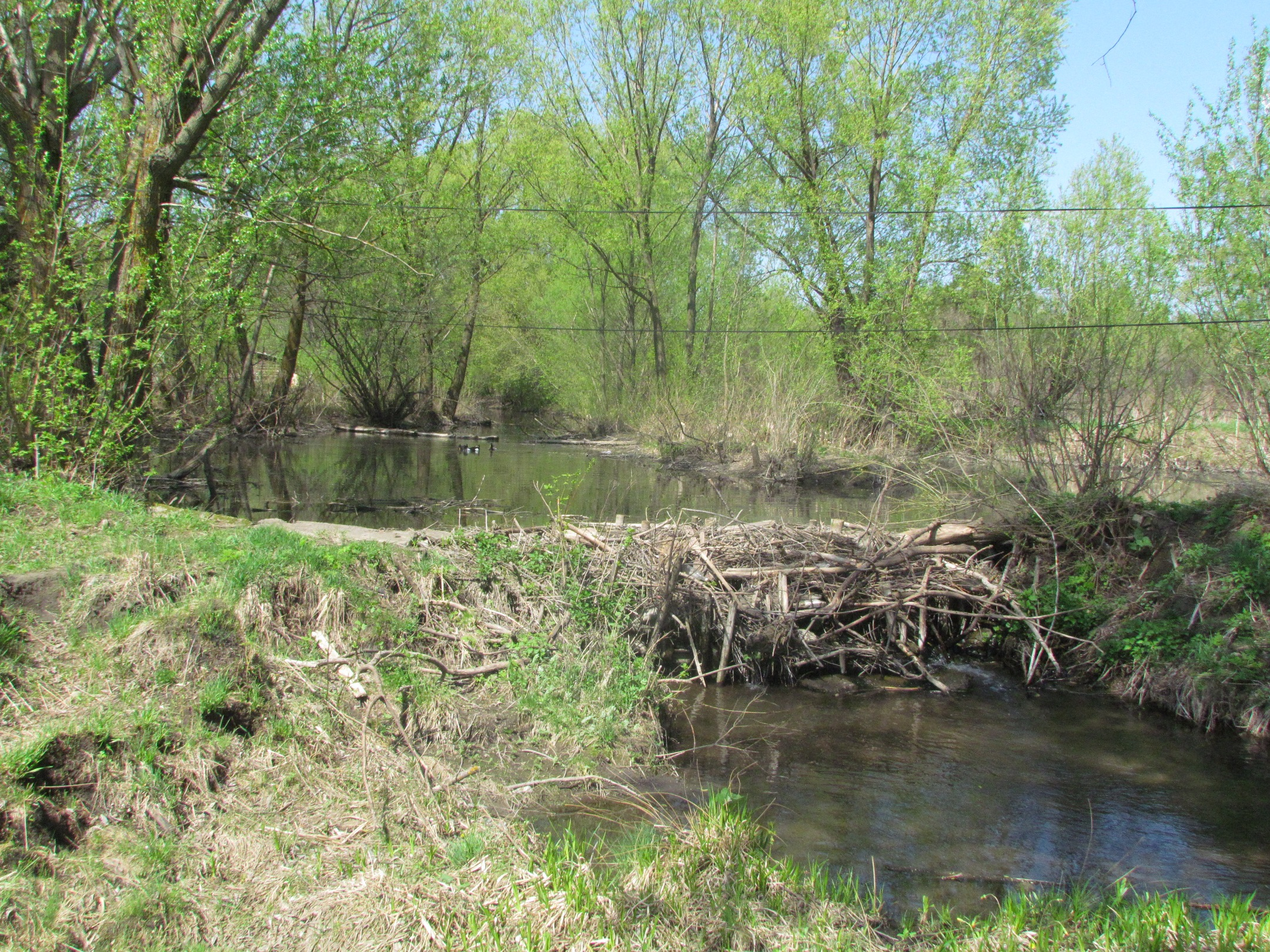
Beaver dam on Sosnovochka river. 2015.

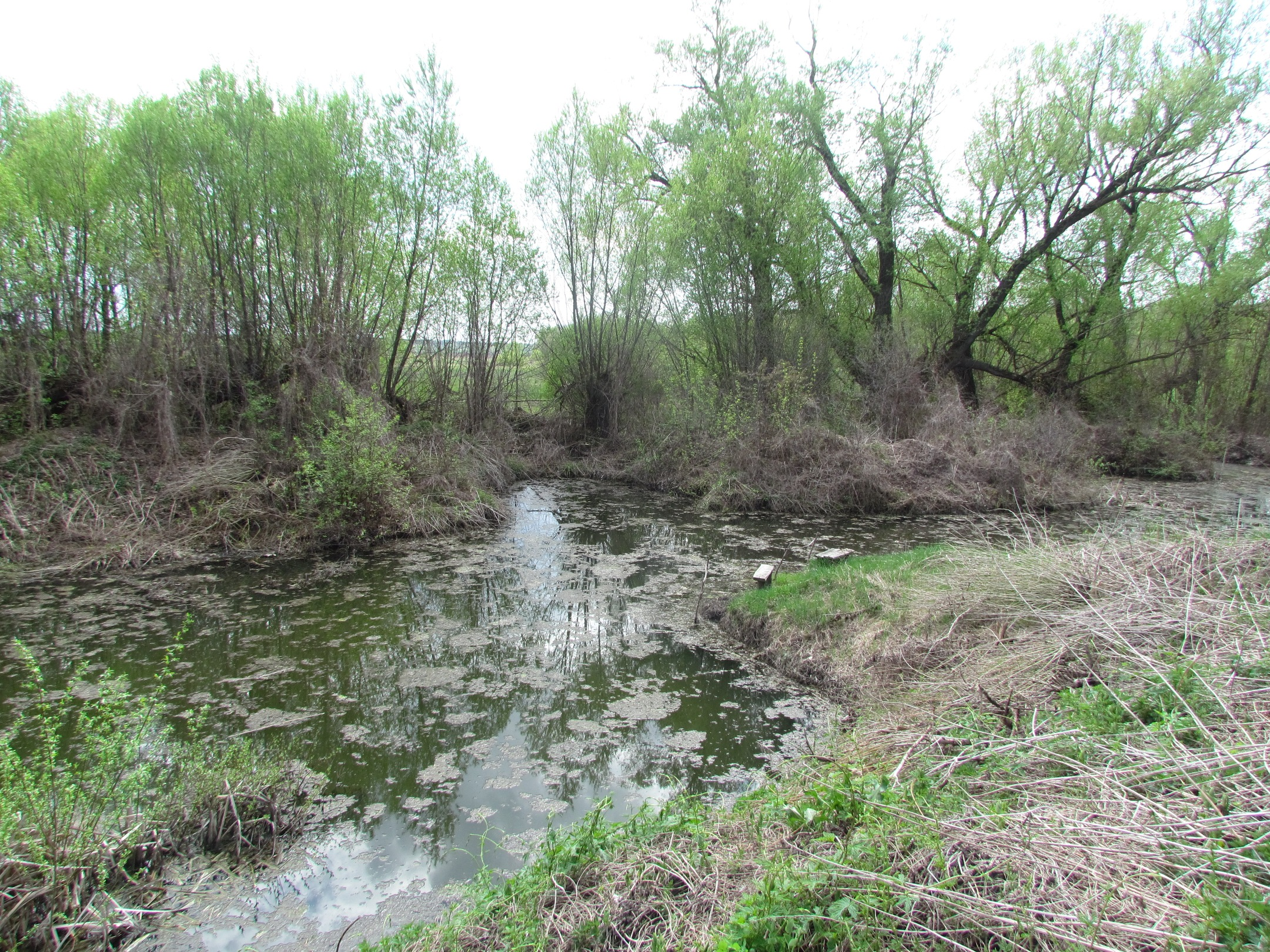
Pound near Pervomayskaya (Samodurovka) st. 2015

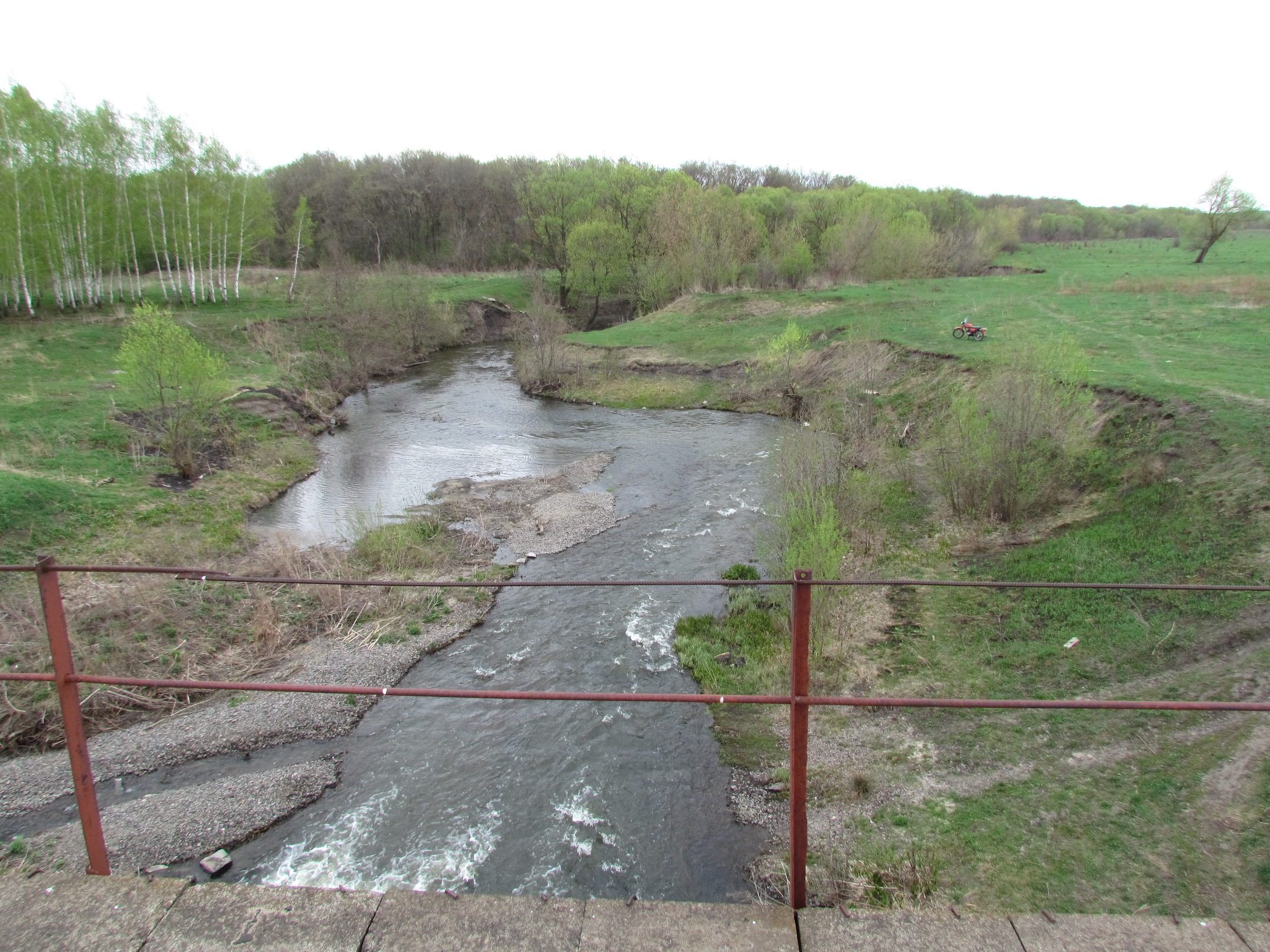
The Mitkirey river near Bekovo railway bridge. 2015

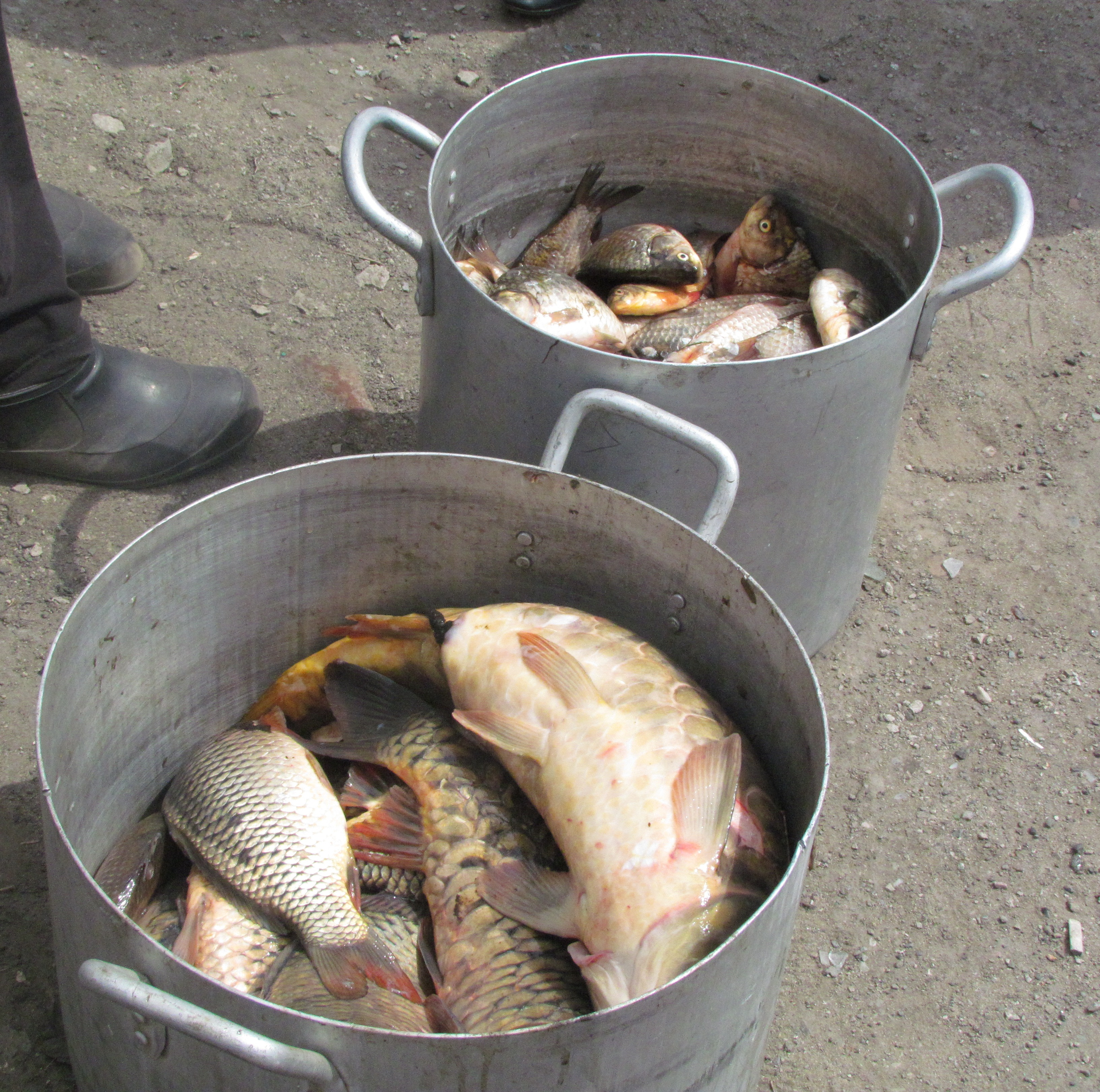
Carps from the Khopyor River. 2015

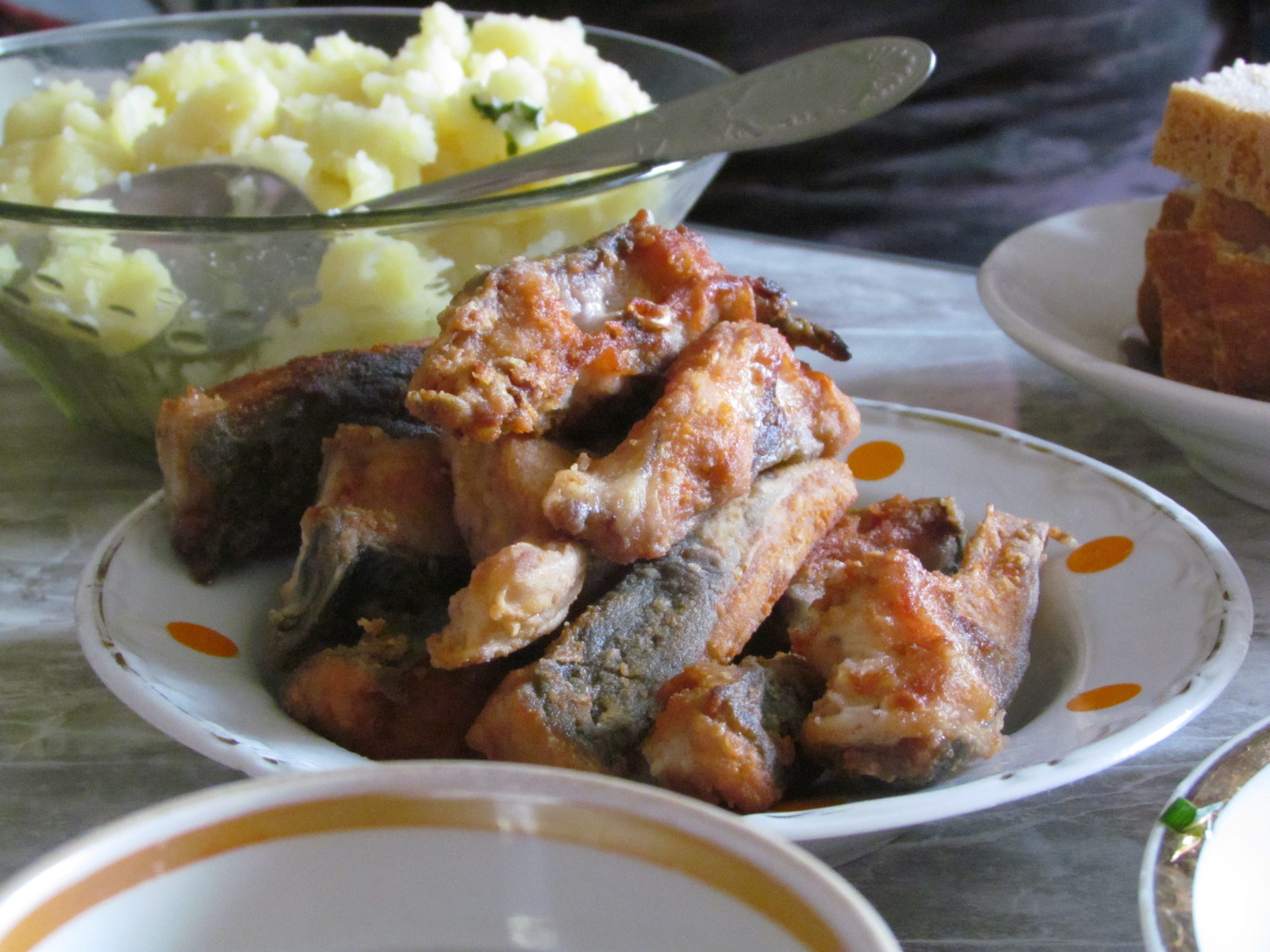
Carps on the table. 2015
