= Bekovo, Penza Oblast =

Bekovo Беково
- Work settlement
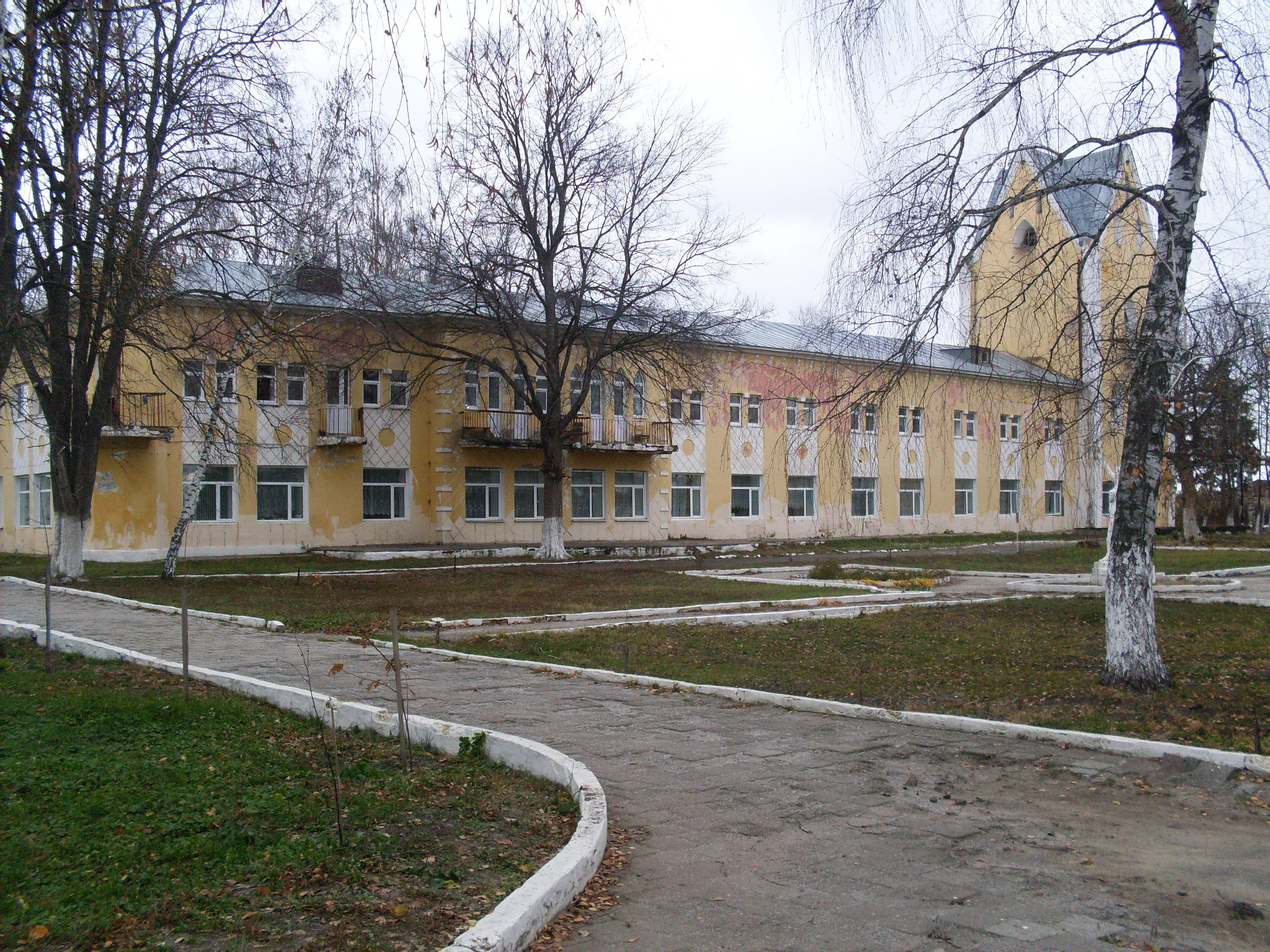
- Bekovo. The Gothic lock. 2011.

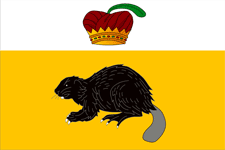
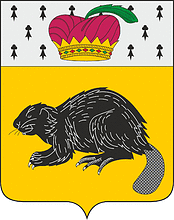
- Flag Coat of arms
- Interactive map of Bekovo
- Location of Bekovo Bekovo (Penza Oblast)
- Coordinates: 52°27′54″N 43°42′36″E
- Country: Russia
- Federal subject: Penza Oblast
- Administrative district: Bekovsky District
- Founded: Late 17th century
- Urban-type settlement status since: 1959
- Elevation: 155 m (509 ft)

Population (2010 Census)
  - Total: 6,941
  - Estimate (2021): 6,099 (−12.1%)

Administrative status
  - Capital of: Bekovsky District

Municipal status
  - Municipal district: Bekovsky Municipal District
  - Urban settlement: Bekovo Urban Settlement
  - Capital of: Bekovsky Municipal District, Bekovo Urban Settlement
- Time zone: UTC+3 (MSK)
- Postal codes: 442940, 442941
- OKTMO ID: 56609151051

Bekovo (Russian: Бе́ково) is an urban locality (a work settlement) and the administrative center of Bekovsky District of Penza Oblast, Russia, located to the extreme south of the oblast on the right bank of the Khopyor River, 154 kilometers (96 mi) from Penza. Population: 6,941 (2010 census); 6,891 (2002 census); 7,311 (1989 Soviet census).

== History ==
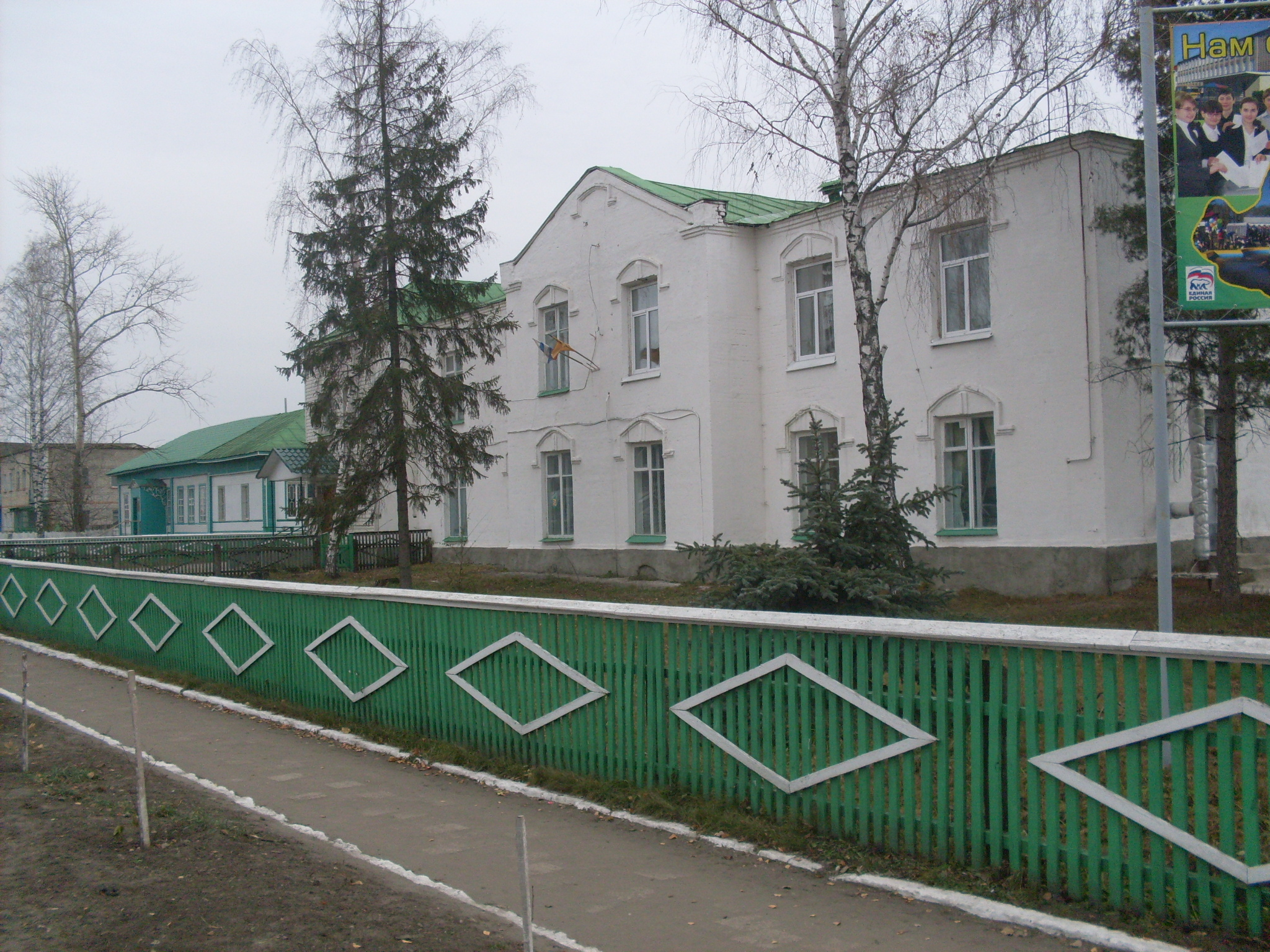
Bekovo Administration building, 2011

It was founded in the late 17th century and renamed in the 18th century after Alexander Bekovich-Cherkassky. The inhabitants built the church of St. Nicholas in 1771 and the Church of the Intercession in 1813. Urban-type settlement status was granted to Bekovo in 1959.

== Transportation ==
It has a railway station on the Tambov-Saratov line, now belonging to the South-Eastern Railway, which opened on February 22, 1874.

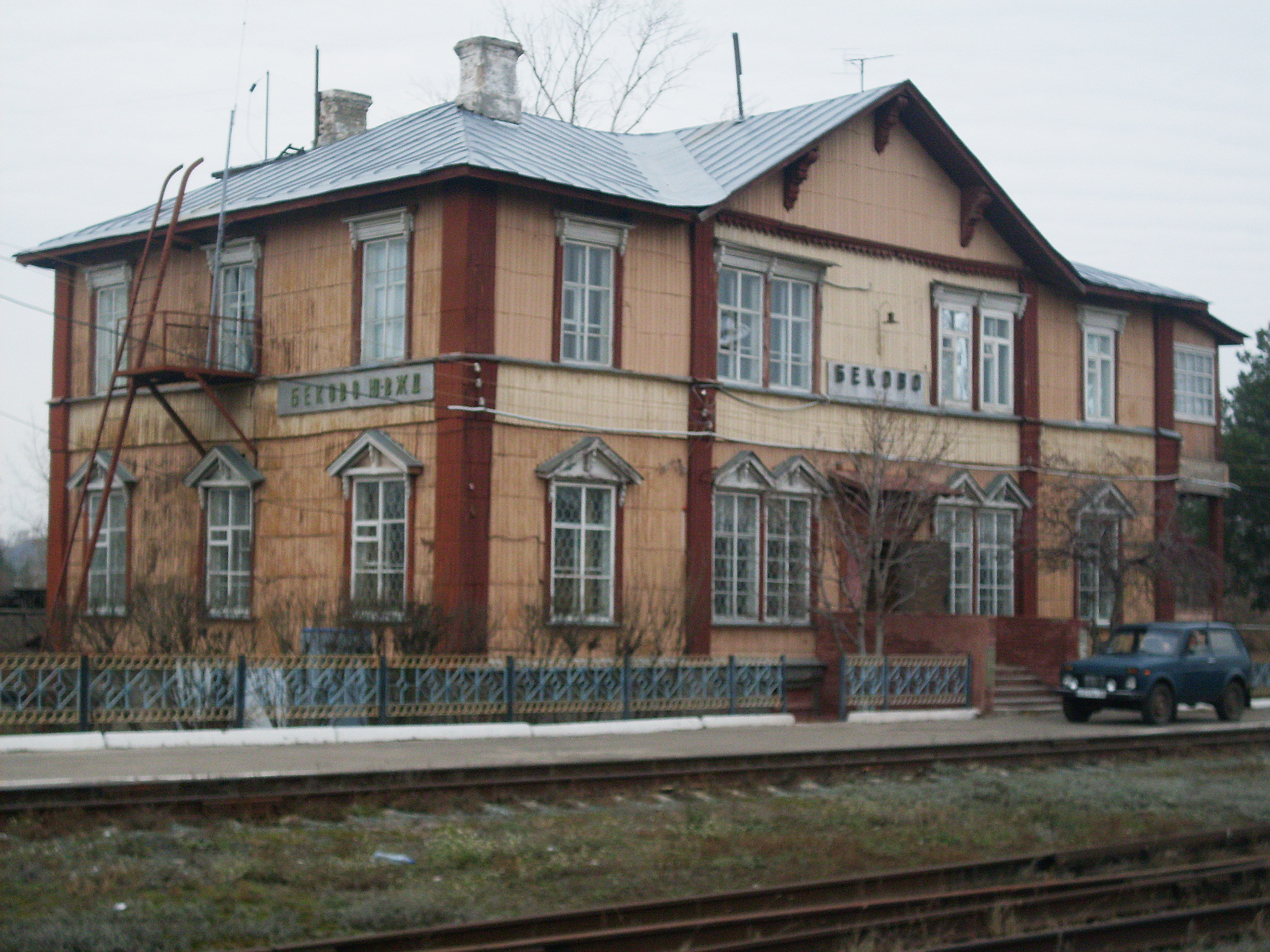
Bekovo railway station.
2011

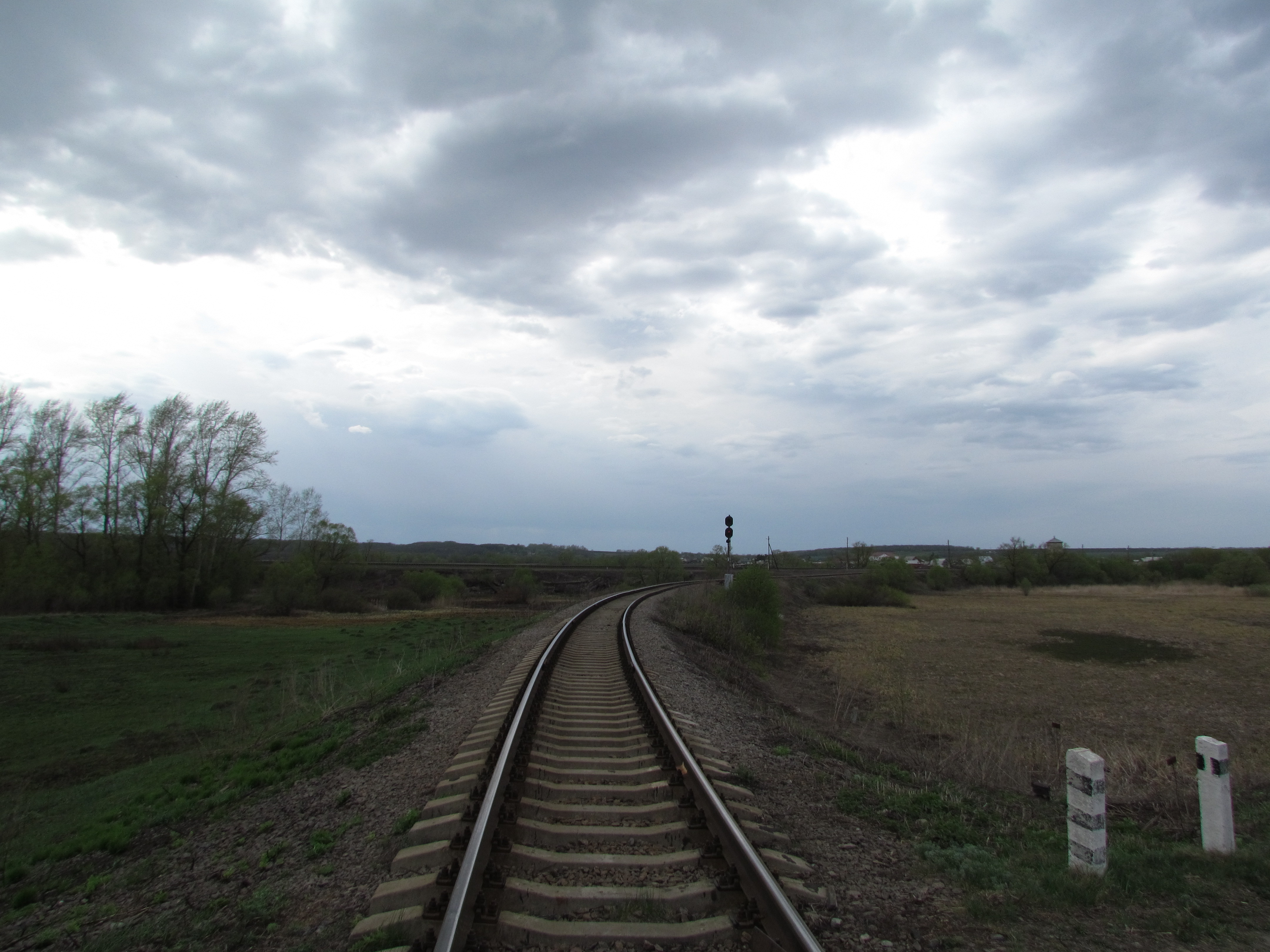
Bekovo railway branch near Sosnovka
2015 год

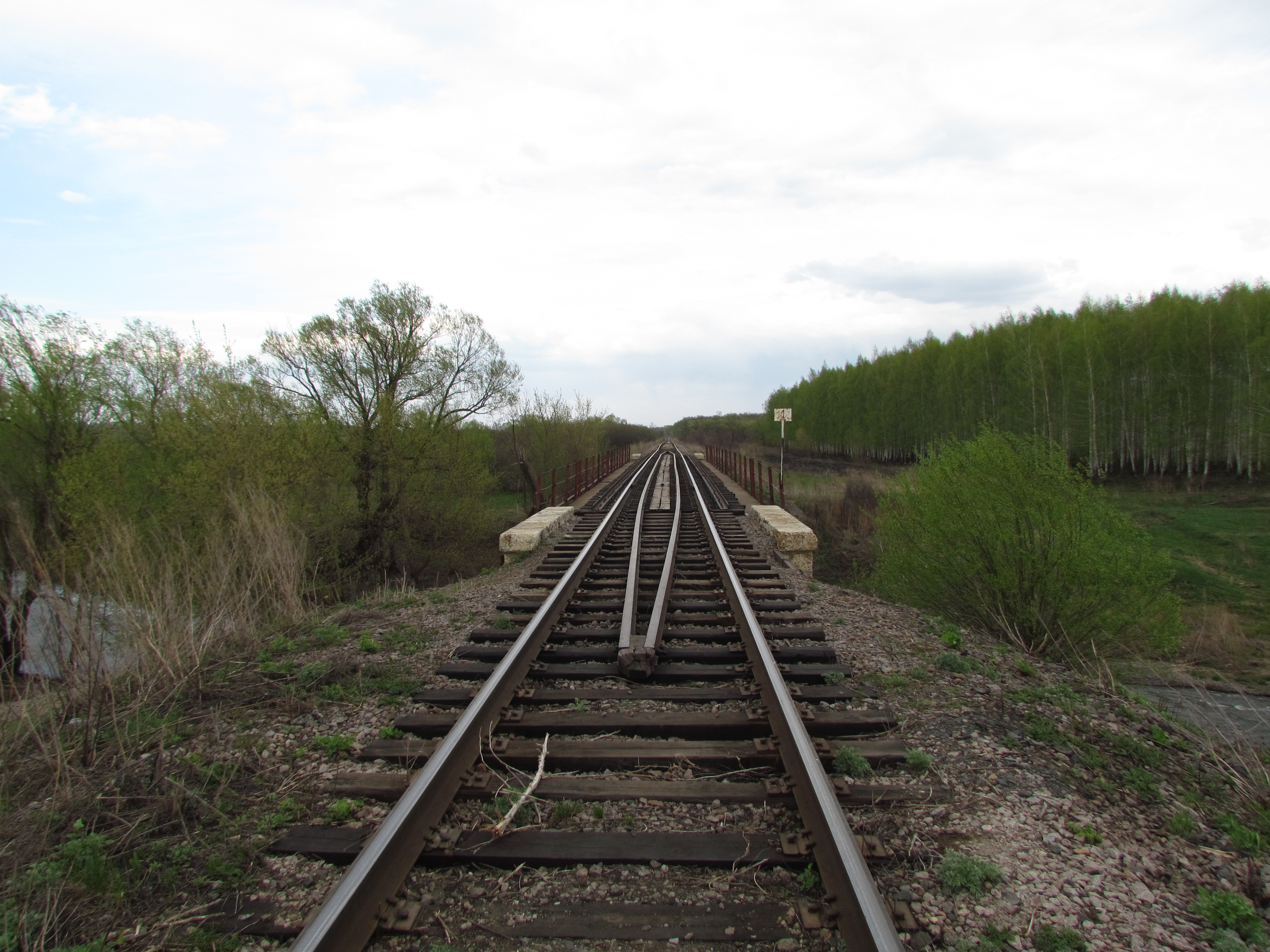
Bekovo railway bridge across the Mitkirey river near Sosnovka,
2015 год
