= Bekovsky District =

Bekovsky District Бековский район (Russian)
- District
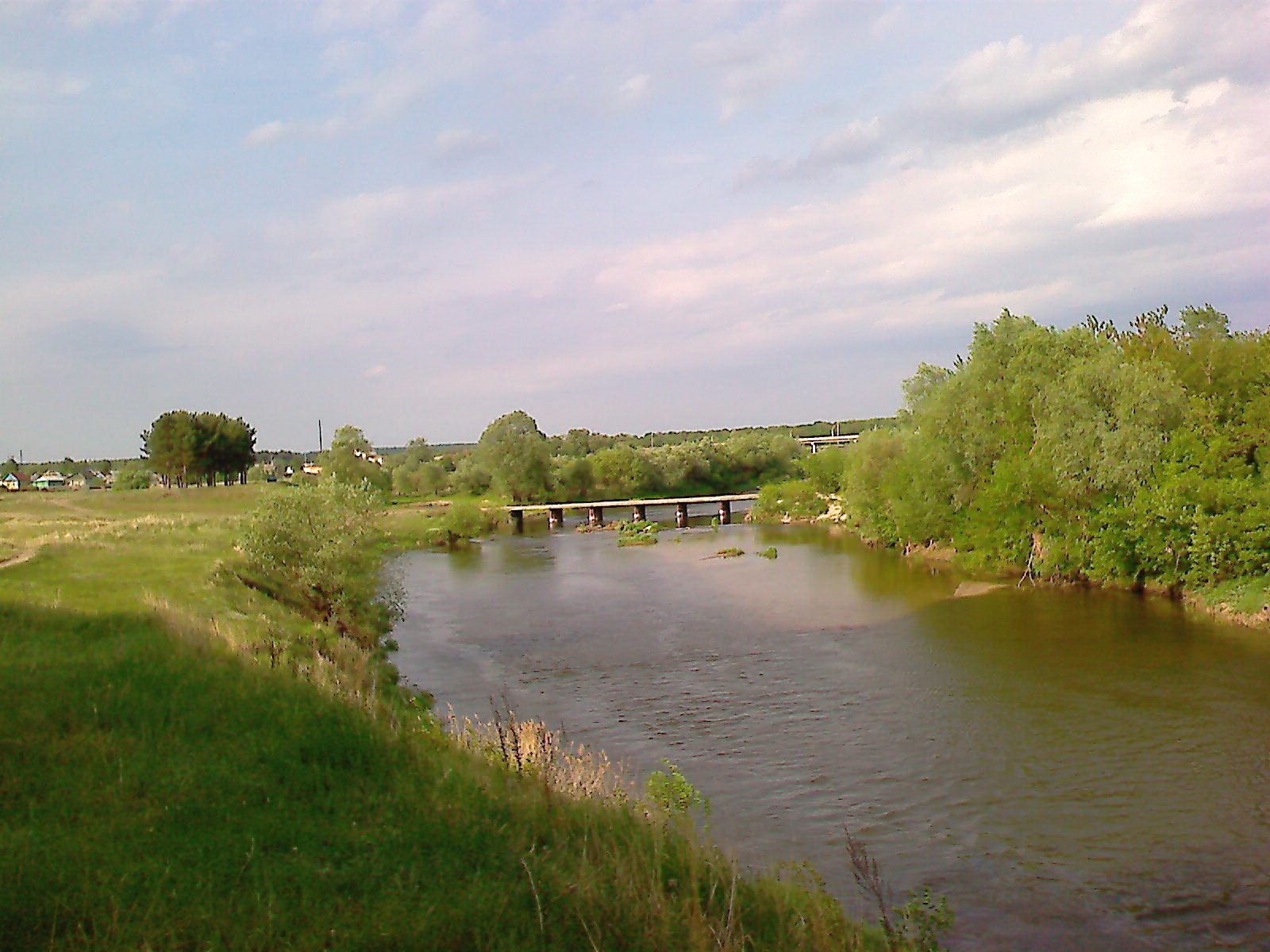
- The Khopyor River near Bekovo, Bekovsky District

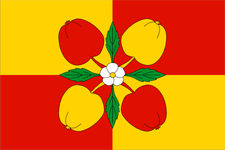
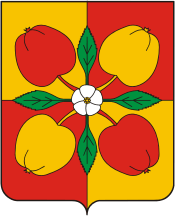
- Flag Coat of arms
- Location of Bekovsky District in Penza Oblast
- Coordinates: 52°28′N 43°43′E
- Country: Russia
- Federal subject: Penza Oblast
- Established: 1928
- Administrative center: Bekovo

Area
  - Total: 1,016 km^{2} (392 sq mi)

Population (2010 Census)
  - Total: 17,531
  - Estimate (January 2015): 15,982
  - Density: 17.25/km^{2} (44.69/sq mi)
  - Urban: 39.6%
  - Rural: 60.4%

Administrative structure
  - Administrative divisions: 1 Work settlements, 8 Selsoviets
  - Inhabited localities: 1 urban-type settlements, 34 rural localities

Municipal structure
  - Municipally incorporated as: Bekovsky Municipal District
  - Municipal divisions: 1 urban settlements, 8 rural settlements
- Time zone: UTC+3 (MSK)
- OKTMO ID: 56609000
- Website: http://rbek.pnzreg.ru

Population of Bekovsky District
- 2010 Census: 17,531
- 2002 Census: 18,853
- 1989 Census: 21,474
- 1979 Census: 24,625

Bekovsky District (Russian: Бе́ковский райо́н) is an administrative and municipal district (raion), one of the twenty-seven in Penza Oblast, Russia.

== Geography ==
It is located in the southwest of the oblast. The area of the district is 1,016 square kilometers (392 sq mi).

== Administration ==
Its administrative center is the urban locality (a work settlement) of Bekovo.

== Demographics ==
As of the 2010 Census, the total population of the district was 17,531, with the population of Bekovo accounting for 39.6% of that number.

== History ==
The district was established in 1928.
