= Dubrovka (inhabited locality) =

Dubrovka (Russian: Дубро́вка) is the name of several inhabited localities in Russia.

== Altai Republic ==
As of 2010, one rural locality in the Altai Republic bears this name:

- Dubrovka, Altai Republic, a settlement in Mayminskoye Rural Settlement of Mayminsky District

== Amur Oblast ==
As of 2010, one rural locality in Amur Oblast bears this name:

- Dubrovka, Amur Oblast, a selo in Amursky Rural Settlement of Belogorsky District

== Republic of Bashkortostan ==
As of 2010, five rural localities in the Republic of Bashkortostan bear this name:

- Dubrovka, Aurgazinsky District, Republic of Bashkortostan, a village in Ibrayevsky Selsoviet of Aurgazinsky District
- Dubrovka, Bakalinsky District, Republic of Bashkortostan, a village in Staromatinsky Selsoviet of Bakalinsky District
- Dubrovka, Bizhbulyaksky District, Republic of Bashkortostan, a village in Kamensky Selsoviet of Bizhbulyaksky District
- Dubrovka, Karaidelsky District, Republic of Bashkortostan, a village in Urgushevsky Selsoviet of Karaidelsky District
- Dubrovka, Miyakinsky District, Republic of Bashkortostan, a village in Bolshekarkalinsky Selsoviet of Miyakinsky District

== Belgorod Oblast ==
As of 2010, one rural locality in Belgorod Oblast bears this name:

- Dubrovka, Belgorod Oblast, a khutor in Biryuchansky Rural Administration of Valuysky District

== Bryansk Oblast ==
As of 2010, ten inhabited localities in Bryansk Oblast bear this name:

- Dubrovka, Dubrovsky Settlement Administrative Okrug, Dubrovsky District, Bryansk Oblast, a work settlement under the administrative jurisdiction of Dubrovksky Settlement Administrative Okrug of Dubrovsky District
- Dubrovka, Brasovsky District, Bryansk Oblast, a selo in Dubrovsky Selsoviet of Brasovsky District
- Dubrovka, Bryansky District, Bryansk Oblast, a village in Novodarkovichsky Selsoviet of Bryansky District
- Dubrovka, Davydchensky Selsoviet, Dubrovsky District, Bryansk Oblast, a village in Davydchensky Selsoviet of Dubrovsky District
- Dubrovka, Gordeyevsky District, Bryansk Oblast, a settlement in Kazarichsky Selsoviet of Gordeyevsky District
- Dubrovka, Novozybkovsky District, Bryansk Oblast, a village in Snovsky Selsoviet of Novozybkovsky District
- Dubrovka, Pochepsky District, Bryansk Oblast, a settlement in Gushchinsky Selsoviet of Pochepsky District
- Dubrovka, Rognedinsky District, Bryansk Oblast, a village in Starokhotmirovsky Selsoviet of Rognedinsky District
- Dubrovka, Surazhsky District, Bryansk Oblast, a selo in Dubrovsky Selsoviet of Surazhsky District
- Dubrovka, Unechsky District, Bryansk Oblast, a village in Lizogubovsky Selsoviet of Unechsky District

== Chelyabinsk Oblast ==
As of 2010, three rural localities in Chelyabinsk Oblast bear this name:

- Dubrovka, Korkinsky District, Chelyabinsk Oblast, a village under the administrative jurisdiction of the town of Korkino in Korkinsky District
- Dubrovka, Krasnoarmeysky District, Chelyabinsk Oblast, a settlement in Dubrovsky Selsoviet of Krasnoarmeysky District
- Dubrovka, Troitsky District, Chelyabinsk Oblast, a village in Belozersky Selsoviet of Troitsky District

== Ivanovo Oblast ==
As of 2010, two rural localities in Ivanovo Oblast bear this name:

- Dubrovka, Gavrilovo-Posadsky District, Ivanovo Oblast, a selo in Gavrilovo-Posadsky District
- Dubrovka, Savinsky District, Ivanovo Oblast, a village in Savinsky District

== Kaliningrad Oblast ==
- Dubrovka, Bagrationovsky District, a village in Bagrationovsky District

== Kaluga Oblast ==
As of 2010, thirteen rural localities in Kaluga Oblast bear this name:

- Dubrovka (Kotor Rural Settlement), Duminichsky District, Kaluga Oblast, a village in Duminichsky District; municipally, a part of Kotor Rural Settlement of that district
- Dubrovka (Dubrovka Rural Settlement), Duminichsky District, Kaluga Oblast, a village in Duminichsky District; municipally, a part of Dubrovka Rural Settlement of that district
- Dubrovka (Nizhniye Pryski Rural Settlement), Kozelsky District, Kaluga Oblast, a village in Kozelsky District; municipally, a part of Nizhniye Pryski Rural Settlement of that district
- Dubrovka (Lavrovsk Rural Settlement), Kozelsky District, Kaluga Oblast, a village in Kozelsky District; municipally, a part of Lavrovsk Rural Settlement of that district
- Dubrovka (Mokroye Rural Settlement), Kuybyshevsky District, Kaluga Oblast, a village in Kuybyshevsky District; municipally, a part of Mokroye Rural Settlement of that district
- Dubrovka (Butchino Rural Settlement), Kuybyshevsky District, Kaluga Oblast, a village in Kuybyshevsky District; municipally, a part of Butchino Rural Settlement of that district
- Dubrovka, Lyudinovsky District, Kaluga Oblast, a village in Lyudinovsky District
- Dubrovka (Shumyatino Rural Settlement), Maloyaroslavetsky District, Kaluga Oblast, a village in Maloyaroslavetsky District; municipally, a part of Shumyatino Rural Settlement of that district
- Dubrovka (Yubileyny Rural Settlement), Maloyaroslavetsky District, Kaluga Oblast, a village in Maloyaroslavetsky District; municipally, a part of Yubileyny Rural Settlement of that district
- Dubrovka (Rameno Rural Settlement), Mosalsky District, Kaluga Oblast, a village in Mosalsky District; municipally, a part of Rameno Rural Settlement of that district
- Dubrovka (Borovensk Rural Settlement), Mosalsky District, Kaluga Oblast, a village in Mosalsky District; municipally, a part of Borovensk Rural Settlement of that district
- Dubrovka, Zhizdrinsky District, Kaluga Oblast, a village in Zhizdrinsky District
- Dubrovka, Zhukovsky District, Kaluga Oblast, a village in Zhukovsky District

== Kemerovo Oblast ==
As of 2010, one rural locality in Kemerovo Oblast bears this name:

- Dubrovka, Kemerovo Oblast, a settlement in Dubrovskaya Rural Territory of Tyazhinsky District

== Kirov Oblast ==
As of 2010, three rural localities in Kirov Oblast bear this name:

- Dubrovka, Belokholunitsky District, Kirov Oblast, a settlement in Dubrovsky Rural Okrug of Belokholunitsky District
- Dubrovka, Malmyzhsky District, Kirov Oblast, a village in Aryksky Rural Okrug of Malmyzhsky District
- Dubrovka, Urzhumsky District, Kirov Oblast, a village in Lopyalsky Rural Okrug of Urzhumsky District

== Kostroma Oblast ==
As of 2010, one rural locality in Kostroma Oblast bears this name:

- Dubrovka, Kostroma Oblast, a settlement in Sudayskoye Settlement of Chukhlomsky District

== Kurgan Oblast ==
As of 2010, one rural locality in Kurgan Oblast bears this name:

- Dubrovka, Kurgan Oblast, a village in Polovinsky Selsoviet of Polovinsky District

== Leningrad Oblast ==
As of 2010, four inhabited localities in Leningrad Oblast bear this name:

- Dubrovka, Vsevolozhsky District, Leningrad Oblast, an urban-type settlement in Vsevolozhsky District
- Dubrovka, Boksitogorsky District, Leningrad Oblast, a village in Klimovskoye Settlement Municipal Formation of Boksitogorsky District
- Dubrovka, Oredezhskoye Settlement Municipal Formation, Luzhsky District, Leningrad Oblast, a village in Oredezhskoye Settlement Municipal Formation of Luzhsky District
- Dubrovka, Serebryanskoye Settlement Municipal Formation, Luzhsky District, Leningrad Oblast, a village in Serebryanskoye Settlement Municipal Formation of Luzhsky District

== Lipetsk Oblast ==
As of 2010, two rural localities in Lipetsk Oblast bear this name:

- Dubrovka, Lebedyansky District, Lipetsk Oblast, a village in Kulikovsky Selsoviet of Lebedyansky District
- Dubrovka, Terbunsky District, Lipetsk Oblast, a village in Uritsky Selsoviet of Terbunsky District

== Mari El Republic ==
As of 2010, three rural localities in the Mari El Republic bear this name:

- Dubrovka, Kuzhenersky District, Mari El Republic, a village in Shudumarsky Rural Okrug of Kuzhenersky District
- Dubrovka, Mari-Tureksky District, Mari El Republic, a village in Mariysky Rural Okrug of Mari-Tureksky District
- Dubrovka, Paranginsky District, Mari El Republic, a village in Iletsky Rural Okrug of Paranginsky District

== Moscow Oblast ==
As of 2010, three rural localities in Moscow Oblast bear this name:

- Dubrovka, Chekhovsky District, Moscow Oblast, a village in Stremilovskoye Rural Settlement of Chekhovsky District
- Dubrovka, Naro-Fominsky District, Moscow Oblast, a village in Veselevskoye Rural Settlement of Naro-Fominsky District
- Dubrovka, Shatursky District, Moscow Oblast, a village in Dmitrovskoye Rural Settlement of Shatursky District

== Nizhny Novgorod Oblast ==
As of 2010, three rural localities in Nizhny Novgorod Oblast bear this name:

- Dubrovka, Bolsheboldinsky District, Nizhny Novgorod Oblast, a village in Novoslobodsky Selsoviet of Bolsheboldinsky District
- Dubrovka, Krasnooktyabrsky District, Nizhny Novgorod Oblast, a village in Sarginsky Selsoviet of Krasnooktyabrsky District
- Dubrovka, Vachsky District, Nizhny Novgorod Oblast, a village in Novoselsky Selsoviet of Vachsky District

== Novgorod Oblast ==
As of 2010, twelve rural localities in Novgorod Oblast bear this name:

- Dubrovka, Batetskoye Settlement, Batetsky District, Novgorod Oblast, a village in Batetskoye Settlement of Batetsky District
- Dubrovka, Moykinskoye Settlement, Batetsky District, Novgorod Oblast, a village in Moykinskoye Settlement of Batetsky District
- Dubrovka, Krestetsky District, Novgorod Oblast, a khutor in Ruchyevskoye Settlement of Krestetsky District
- Dubrovka, Lyubytinskoye Settlement, Lyubytinsky District, Novgorod Oblast, a village under the administrative jurisdiction of Lyubytinskoye Settlement, Lyubytinsky District
- Dubrovka, Nebolchskoye Settlement, Lyubytinsky District, Novgorod Oblast, a village under the administrative jurisdiction of Nebolchskoye Settlement, Lyubytinsky District
- Dubrovka, Malovishersky District, Novgorod Oblast, a village in Verebyinskoye Settlement of Malovishersky District
- Dubrovka, Maryovsky District, Novgorod Oblast, a village in Molvotitskoye Settlement of Maryovsky District
- Dubrovka, Borkovskoye Settlement, Novgorodsky District, Novgorod Oblast, a village in Borkovskoye Settlement of Novgorodsky District
- Dubrovka, Bronnitskoye Settlement, Novgorodsky District, Novgorod Oblast, a village in Bronnitskoye Settlement of Novgorodsky District
- Dubrovka, Savinskoye Settlement, Novgorodsky District, Novgorod Oblast, a village in Savinskoye Settlement of Novgorodsky District
- Dubrovka, Starorussky District, Novgorod Oblast, a village in Nagovskoye Settlement of Starorussky District
- Dubrovka, Valdaysky District, Novgorod Oblast, a village in Lyubnitskoye Settlement of Valdaysky District

== Novosibirsk Oblast ==
As of 2010, one rural locality in Novosibirsk Oblast bears this name:

- Dubrovka, Novosibirsk Oblast, a selo in Maslyaninsky District

== Omsk Oblast ==
As of 2010, three rural localities in Omsk Oblast bear this name:

- Dubrovka, Gorkovsky District, Omsk Oblast, a village in Oktyabrsky Rural Okrug of Gorkovsky District
- Dubrovka, Kormilovsky District, Omsk Oblast, a village in Alexeyevsky Rural Okrug of Kormilovsky District
- Dubrovka, Sherbakulsky District, Omsk Oblast, a village in Kutuzovsky Rural Okrug of Sherbakulsky District

== Orenburg Oblast ==
As of 2010, one rural locality in Orenburg Oblast bears this name:

- Dubrovka, Orenburg Oblast, a selo in Dubrovsky Selsoviet of Sharlyksky District

== Oryol Oblast ==
As of 2010, five rural localities in Oryol Oblast bear this name:

- Dubrovka, Dolzhansky District, Oryol Oblast, a village in Dubrovsky Selsoviet of Dolzhansky District
- Dubrovka, Sergiyevsky Selsoviet, Livensky District, Oryol Oblast, a village in Sergiyevsky Selsoviet of Livensky District
- Dubrovka, Vakhnovsky Selsoviet, Livensky District, Oryol Oblast, a village in Vakhnovsky Selsoviet of Livensky District
- Dubrovka, Novoderevenkovsky District, Oryol Oblast, a village in Sudbishchensky Selsoviet of Novoderevenkovsky District
- Dubrovka, Zalegoshchensky District, Oryol Oblast, a village in Krasnensky Selsoviet of Zalegoshchensky District

== Perm Krai ==
As of 2010, two rural localities in Perm Krai bear this name:

- Dubrovka, Yurlinsky District, Perm Krai, name of two villages in Yurlinsky District

== Pskov Oblast ==
As of 2010, nine rural localities in Pskov Oblast bear this name:

- Dubrovka, Dedovichsky District, Pskov Oblast, a village in Dedovichsky District
- Dubrovka (Dolgovitskaya Rural Settlement), Kunyinsky District, Pskov Oblast, a village in Kunyinsky District; municipally, a part of Dolgovitskaya Rural Settlement of that district
- Dubrovka (Kaskovskaya Rural Settlement), Kunyinsky District, Pskov Oblast, a village in Kunyinsky District; municipally, a part of Kaskovskaya Rural Settlement of that district
- Dubrovka, Ostrovsky District, Pskov Oblast, a village in Ostrovsky District
- Dubrovka, Pechorsky District, Pskov Oblast, a village in Pechorsky District
- Dubrovka, Plyussky District, Pskov Oblast, a village in Plyussky District
- Dubrovka, Pustoshkinsky District, Pskov Oblast, a village in Pustoshkinsky District
- Dubrovka, Sebezhsky District, Pskov Oblast, a village in Sebezhsky District
- Dubrovka, Velikoluksky District, Pskov Oblast, a village in Velikoluksky District

== Ryazan Oblast ==
As of 2010, five rural localities in Ryazan Oblast bear this name:

- Dubrovka, Chuchkovsky District, Ryazan Oblast, a settlement in Zavidovsky Rural Okrug of Chuchkovsky District
- Dubrovka, Miloslavsky District, Ryazan Oblast, a village in Voyeykovsky Rural Okrug of Miloslavsky District
- Dubrovka, Ryazansky District, Ryazan Oblast, a village in Rovnovsky Rural Okrug of Ryazansky District
- Dubrovka, Sarayevsky District, Ryazan Oblast, a village in Muravlyansky Rural Okrug of Sarayevsky District
- Dubrovka, Shilovsky District, Ryazan Oblast, a selo in Tyrnovsky Rural Okrug of Shilovsky District

== Samara Oblast ==
As of 2010, one rural locality in Samara Oblast bears this name:

- Dubrovka, Samara Oblast, a selo in Khvorostyansky District

== Smolensk Oblast ==
As of 2010, eighteen rural localities in Smolensk Oblast bear this name:

- Dubrovka, Demidovsky District, Smolensk Oblast, a village in Dubrovskoye Rural Settlement of Demidovsky District
- Dubrovka, Dorogobuzhsky District, Smolensk Oblast, a village in Knyashchinskoye Rural Settlement of Dorogobuzhsky District
- Dubrovka, Baskakovskoye Rural Settlement, Gagarinsky District, Smolensk Oblast, a village in Baskakovskoye Rural Settlement of Gagarinsky District
- Dubrovka, Prechistenskoye Rural Settlement, Gagarinsky District, Smolensk Oblast, a village in Prechistenskoye Rural Settlement of Gagarinsky District
- Dubrovka, Khislavichsky District, Smolensk Oblast, a village in Pecherskoye Rural Settlement of Khislavichsky District
- Dubrovka, Krasninsky District, Smolensk Oblast, a village in Gusinskoye Rural Settlement of Krasninsky District
- Dubrovka, Monastyrshchinsky District, Smolensk Oblast, a village in Lyubavichskoye Rural Settlement of Monastyrshchinsky District
- Dubrovka, Novoduginsky District, Smolensk Oblast, a village in Tesovskoye Rural Settlement of Novoduginsky District
- Dubrovka, Roslavlsky District, Smolensk Oblast, a village in Ivanovskoye Rural Settlement of Roslavlsky District
- Dubrovka, Kazimirovskoye Rural Settlement, Rudnyansky District, Smolensk Oblast, a village in Kazimirovskoye Rural Settlement of Rudnyansky District
- Dubrovka, Perevolochskoye Rural Settlement, Rudnyansky District, Smolensk Oblast, a village in Perevolochskoye Rural Settlement of Rudnyansky District
- Dubrovka, Nadeykovichskoye Rural Settlement, Shumyachsky District, Smolensk Oblast, a village in Nadeykovichskoye Rural Settlement of Shumyachsky District
- Dubrovka, Pervomayskoye Rural Settlement, Shumyachsky District, Smolensk Oblast, a village in Pervomayskoye Rural Settlement of Shumyachsky District
- Dubrovka, Smetaninskoye Rural Settlement, Smolensky District, Smolensk Oblast, a village in Smetaninskoye Rural Settlement of Smolensky District
- Dubrovka, Vyazginskoye Rural Settlement, Smolensky District, Smolensk Oblast, a village in Vyazginskoye Rural Settlement of Smolensky District
- Dubrovka, Ugransky District, Smolensk Oblast, a village in Poldnevskoye Rural Settlement of Ugransky District
- Dubrovka, Kuzmichskoye Rural Settlement, Yershichsky District, Smolensk Oblast, a village in Kuzmichskoye Rural Settlement of Yershichsky District
- Dubrovka, Poselkovskoye Rural Settlement, Yershichsky District, Smolensk Oblast, a village in Poselkovskoye Rural Settlement of Yershichsky District

== Tambov Oblast ==
As of 2010, one rural locality in Tambov Oblast bears this name:

- Dubrovka, Tambov Oblast, a selo in Dubrovsky Selsoviet of Tambovsky District

== Republic of Tatarstan ==
As of 2010, one rural locality in the Republic of Tatarstan bears this name:

- Dubrovka, Republic of Tatarstan, a settlement in Zelenodolsky District

== Tomsk Oblast ==
As of 2010, one rural locality in Tomsk Oblast bears this name:

- Dubrovka, Tomsk Oblast, a selo in Zyryansky District

== Tver Oblast ==
As of 2010, twenty-four rural localities in Tver Oblast bear this name:

- Dubrovka, Belsky District, Tver Oblast, a village in Belsky District
- Dubrovka (Sukromenskoye Rural Settlement), Bezhetsky District, Tver Oblast, a village in Bezhetsky District; municipally, a part of Sukromenskoye Rural Settlement of that district
- Dubrovka (Fralevskoye Rural Settlement), Bezhetsky District, Tver Oblast, a village in Bezhetsky District; municipally, a part of Fralevskoye Rural Settlement of that district
- Dubrovka, Bologovsky District, Tver Oblast, a village in Bologovsky District
- Dubrovka, Firovsky District, Tver Oblast, a village in Firovsky District
- Dubrovka, Kimrsky District, Tver Oblast, a village in Kimrsky District
- Dubrovka, Likhoslavlsky District, Tver Oblast, a village in Likhoslavlsky District
- Dubrovka (Zarechenskoye Rural Settlement), Maksatikhinsky District, Tver Oblast, a village in Maksatikhinsky District; municipally, a part of Zarechenskoye Rural Settlement of that district
- Dubrovka (Seletskoye Rural Settlement), Maksatikhinsky District, Tver Oblast, a village in Maksatikhinsky District; municipally, a part of Seletskoye Rural Settlement of that district
- Dubrovka (Molokovskoye Rural Settlement), Molokovsky District, Tver Oblast, a village in Molokovsky District; municipally, a part of Molokovskoye Rural Settlement of that district
- Dubrovka (Akhmatovskoye Rural Settlement), Molokovsky District, Tver Oblast, a village in Molokovsky District; municipally, a part of Akhmatovskoye Rural Settlement of that district
- Dubrovka (Akhmatovskoye Rural Settlement), Molokovsky District, Tver Oblast, a village in Molokovsky District; municipally, a part of Akhmatovskoye Rural Settlement of that district
- Dubrovka, Oleninsky District, Tver Oblast, a village in Oleninsky District
- Dubrovka, Ostashkovsky District, Tver Oblast, a village in Ostashkovsky District
- Dubrovka, Rzhevsky District, Tver Oblast, a village in Rzhevsky District
- Dubrovka, Sonkovsky District, Tver Oblast, a village in Sonkovsky District
- Dubrovka, Spirovsky District, Tver Oblast, a village in Spirovsky District
- Dubrovka, Staritsky District, Tver Oblast, a village in Staritsky District
- Dubrovka, Toropetsky District, Tver Oblast, a village in Toropetsky District
- Dubrovka (Boristsevskoye Rural Settlement), Torzhoksky District, Tver Oblast, a village in Torzhoksky District; municipally, a part of Boristsevskoye Rural Settlement of that district
- Dubrovka (Maryinskoye Rural Settlement), Torzhoksky District, Tver Oblast, a village in Torzhoksky District; municipally, a part of Maryinskoye Rural Settlement of that district
- Dubrovka, Vyshnevolotsky District, Tver Oblast, a village in Vyshnevolotsky District
- Dubrovka, Zapadnodvinsky District, Tver Oblast, a village in Zapadnodvinsky District
- Dubrovka, Zubtsovsky District, Tver Oblast, a village in Zubtsovsky District

== Udmurt Republic ==
As of 2010, two rural localities in the Udmurt Republic bear this name:

- Dubrovka, Karakulinsky District, Udmurt Republic, a vyselok in Nyrgyndinsky Selsoviet of Karakulinsky District
- Dubrovka, Vavozhsky District, Udmurt Republic, a village in Tylovyl-Pelginsky Selsoviet of Vavozhsky District

== Ulyanovsk Oblast ==
As of 2010, three rural localities in Ulyanovsk Oblast bear this name:

- Dubrovka, Inzensky District, Ulyanovsk Oblast, a settlement in Trusleysky Rural Okrug of Inzensky District
- Dubrovka, Nikolayevsky District, Ulyanovsk Oblast, a selo in Dubrovsky Rural Okrug of Nikolayevsky District
- Dubrovka, Ulyanovsky District, Ulyanovsk Oblast, a village under the administrative jurisdiction of Isheyevsky Settlement Okrug of Ulyanovsky District

== Vladimir Oblast ==
As of 2010, four rural localities in Vladimir Oblast bear this name:

- Dubrovka, Kirzhachsky District, Vladimir Oblast, a village in Kirzhachsky District
- Dubrovka, Melenkovsky District, Vladimir Oblast, a village in Melenkovsky District
- Dubrovka, Petushinsky District, Vladimir Oblast, a village in Petushinsky District
- Dubrovka, Sobinsky District, Vladimir Oblast, a village in Sobinsky District

== Vologda Oblast ==
As of 2010, two rural localities in Vologda Oblast bear this name:

- Dubrovka, Babayevsky District, Vologda Oblast, a village in Dubrovsky Selsoviet of Babayevsky District
- Dubrovka, Ustyuzhensky District, Vologda Oblast, a village in Khripelevsky Selsoviet of Ustyuzhensky District

== Voronezh Oblast ==
As of 2010, two rural localities in Voronezh Oblast bear this name:

- Dubrovka, Anninsky District, Voronezh Oblast, a settlement in Novozhiznenskoye Rural Settlement of Anninsky District
- Dubrovka, Ternovsky District, Voronezh Oblast, a settlement in Kiselinskoye Rural Settlement of Ternovsky District

== Yaroslavl Oblast ==
As of 2010, two rural localities in Yaroslavl Oblast bear this name:

- Dubrovka, Breytovsky District, Yaroslavl Oblast, a village in Sutkovsky Rural Okrug of Breytovsky District
- Dubrovka, Poshekhonsky District, Yaroslavl Oblast, a village in Krasnovsky Rural Okrug of Poshekhonsky District
