= Akhmerovo =

Akhmerovo may refer to the following rural localities in Russia:

- Akhmerovo, Aurgazinsky District, Republic of Bashkortostan
- Akhmerovo, Bakalinsky District, Republic of Bashkortostan
- Akhmerovo, Baymaksky District, Republic of Bashkortostan
- Akhmerovo, Beloretsky District, Republic of Bashkortostan
- Akhmerovo, Ishimbaysky District, Republic of Bashkortostan
