= Verkhnetroitskoye =

Verkhnetroitskoye Верхнетроицкое
- Village
- Location within Bashkortostan Location within Russia
- Coordinates: 55°14′03″N 53°48′34″E
- Country: Russia
- Region: Bashkortostan
- District: Bakalinsky District
- Time zone: UTC+5:00

Verkhnetroitskoye (Russian: Верхнетроицкое) is a rural locality (a village) in Starosharashlinsky Selsoviet, Bakalinsky District, Bashkortostan, Russia. The population was 16 as of 2010. There is 1 street.

== Geography ==
Verkhnetroitskoye is located 7 km north of Bakaly (the district's administrative centre) by road. Novotroitskoye is the nearest rural locality.
