= Narat-Chukur =

Narat-Chukur Нарат-Чукур
- Village
- Location within Bashkortostan Location within Russia
- Coordinates: 55°09′N 53°29′E
- Country: Russia
- Region: Bashkortostan
- District: Bakalinsky District
- Time zone: UTC+5:00

Narat-Chukur (Russian: Нарат-Чукур; Bashkir: Наратсоҡор, Naratsoqor) is a rural locality (a village) in Diyashevsky Selsoviet, Bakalinsky District, Bashkortostan, Russia. The population was 86 as of 2010. There are 2 streets.

== Geography ==
Narat-Chukur is located 31 km west of Bakaly (the district's administrative centre) by road. Nikolayevka is the nearest rural locality.
