= Kamyshlytamak =

Kamyshlytamak Камышлытамак
- Selo
- Location within Bashkortostan Location within Russia
- Coordinates: 55°02′N 53°43′E
- Country: Russia
- Region: Bashkortostan
- District: Bakalinsky District
- Time zone: UTC+5:00

Kamyshlytamak (Russian: Камышлытамак; Bashkir: Ҡамышлытамаҡ, Qamışlıtamaq) is a rural locality (a selo) and the administrative centre of Kamyshlytamaksky Selsoviet, Bakalinsky District, Bashkortostan, Russia. The population was 468 as of 2010. There are 9 streets.

== Geography ==
Kamyshlytamak is located 23 km south of Bakaly (the district's administrative centre) by road. Sakatovo is the nearest rural locality.
