= Yum (selo) =

Yum Юм
- Selo
- Location within Perm Krai Location within Russia
- Coordinates: 59°24′N 54°05′E
- Country: Russia
- Region: Perm Krai
- District: Yurlinsky District
- Time zone: UTC+5:00

Yum (Russian: Юм) is a rural locality (a selo) in Yurlinskoye Rural Settlement, Yurlinsky District, Perm Krai, Russia. The population was 222 as of 2010. There are 5 streets.

== Geography ==
Yum is located 17 km northwest of Yurla (the district's administrative centre) by road. Komarikha is the nearest rural locality.
