= Gurdybashevo =

Gurdybashevo Гурдыбашево
- Village
- Location within Bashkortostan Location within Russia
- Coordinates: 55°12′N 54°05′E
- Country: Russia
- Region: Bashkortostan
- District: Bakalinsky District
- Time zone: UTC+5:00

Gurdybashevo (Russian: Гурдыбашево; Bashkir: Гүрҙебаш, Gürźebaş) is a rural locality (a village) in Taktagulovsky Selsoviet, Bakalinsky District, Bashkortostan, Russia. The population was 105 as of 2010. There is 1 street.

== Geography ==
Gurdybashevo is located 27 km east of Bakaly (the district's administrative centre) by road. Mullanurovo is the nearest rural locality.
