= Buzyurovo =

Buzyurovo Бузюрово
- Selo
- Location within Bashkortostan Location within Russia
- Coordinates: 55°05′N 53°33′E
- Country: Russia
- Region: Bashkortostan
- District: Bakalinsky District
- Time zone: UTC+5:00

Buzyurovo (Russian: Бузюрово; Bashkir: Бозор, Bozor; Tatar: Боҗыр, Bocır) is a rural locality (a selo) and the administrative centre of Buzyurovsky Selsoviet, Bakalinsky District, Bashkortostan, Russia. The population was 486 as of 2010. There are 6 streets.

== Geography ==
Buzyurovo is located 24 km southwest of Bakaly (the district's administrative centre) by road. Alexandrovka is the nearest rural locality.
