= Staryye Balykly =

Staryye Balykly Старые Балыклы
- Selo
- Location within Bashkortostan Location within Russia
- Coordinates: 55°07′N 53°43′E
- Country: Russia
- Region: Bashkortostan
- District: Bakalinsky District
- Time zone: UTC+5:00

Staryye Balykly (Russian: Старые Балыклы; Bashkir: Иҫке Балыҡлы, İśke Balıqlı) is a rural locality (a selo) in Akhmanovsky Selsoviet, Bakalinsky District, Bashkortostan, Russia. The population was 489 as of 2010. There are 4 streets.

== Geography ==
Staryye Balykly is located 8 km southwest of Bakaly (the district's administrative centre) by road. Akhmanovo is the nearest rural locality.
