= Novyye Usy =

Novyye Usy Новые Усы
- Village
- Location within Bashkortostan Location within Russia
- Coordinates: 55°06′N 53°22′E
- Country: Russia
- Region: Bashkortostan
- District: Bakalinsky District
- Time zone: UTC+5:00

Novyye Usy (Russian: Новые Усы; Bashkir: Яңы Уҫы, Yañı Uśı) is a rural locality (a village) in Novoursayevsky Selsoviet, Bakalinsky District, Bashkortostan, Russia. The population was 8 as of 2010. There is 1 street.

== Geography ==
Novyye Usy is located 36 km southwest of Bakaly (the district's administrative centre) by road. Muslyuminka is the nearest rural locality.
