= Yurminka =

Yurminka Юрминка
- Village
- Location within Bashkortostan Location within Russia
- Coordinates: 55°10′N 53°26′E
- Country: Russia
- Region: Bashkortostan
- District: Bakalinsky District
- Time zone: UTC+5:00

Yurminka (Russian: Юрминка; Bashkir: Юрмый, Yurmıy) is a rural locality (a village) in Starokosteyevsky Selsoviet, Bakalinsky District, Bashkortostan, Russia. The population was 5 as of 2010. There is 1 street.

== Geography ==
Yurminka is located 29 km west of Bakaly (the district's administrative centre) by road. Fedorovka is the nearest rural locality.
