= Novoursayevo =

Novoursayevo Новоурсаево
- Selo
- Location within Bashkortostan Location within Russia
- Coordinates: 55°07′N 53°24′E
- Country: Russia
- Region: Bashkortostan
- District: Bakalinsky District
- Time zone: UTC+5:00

Novoursayevo (Russian: Новоурсаево; Bashkir: Яңы Урсай, Yañı Ursay) is a rural locality (a selo) and the administrative center of Novoursayevsky Selsoviet, Bakalinsky District, Bashkortostan, Russia. The population was 418 as of 2010. There are 6 streets.

== Geography ==
Novoursayevo is located 37 km west of Bakaly (the district's administrative centre) by road. Muslyuminka is the nearest rural locality.
