= Starokuruchevo =

Starokuruchevo Старокуручево
- Selo
- Location within Bashkortostan Location within Russia
- Coordinates: 55°08′N 54°03′E
- Country: Russia
- Region: Bashkortostan
- District: Bakalinsky District
- Time zone: UTC+5:00

Starokuruchevo (Russian: Старокуручево; Bashkir: Иҫке Ҡорос, İśke Qoros) is a rural locality (a selo) and the administrative center of Starokuruchevsky Selsoviet, Bakalinsky District, Bashkortostan, Russia. The population was 1,478 as of 2010. There are 20 streets.

== Geography ==
Starokuruchevo is located 21 km southeast of Bakaly (the district's administrative centre) by road. Kilkabyzovo is the nearest rural locality.
