= Novogusevo =

Novogusevo Новогусево
- Village
- Location within Bashkortostan Location within Russia
- Coordinates: 55°05′N 54°07′E
- Country: Russia
- Region: Bashkortostan
- District: Bakalinsky District
- Time zone: UTC+5:00

Novogusevo (Russian: Новогусево) is a rural locality (a village) in Starokuruchevsky Selsoviet, Bakalinsky District, Bashkortostan, Russia. The population was 4 as of 2010. There is 1 street.

== Geography ==
Novogusevo is located 30 km southeast of Bakaly (the district's administrative centre) by road. Starogusevo is the nearest rural locality.
