= Podkina =

Podkina Подкина
- Village
- Location within Perm Krai Location within Russia
- Coordinates: 59°16′N 53°58′E
- Country: Russia
- Region: Perm Krai
- District: Yurlinsky District
- Time zone: UTC+5:00

Podkina (Russian: Подкина) is a rural locality (a village) in Yurlinskoye Rural Settlement, Yurlinsky District, Perm Krai, Russia. The population was 31 as of 2010. There are 4 streets.

== Geography ==
Podkina is located 23 km southwest of Yurla (the district's administrative centre) by road. Zarubina is the nearest rural locality.
