= Derevnya penkozavoda =

Derevnya penkozavoda Деревня пенькозавода
- Village
- Location within Bashkortostan Location within Russia
- Coordinates: 55°05′N 53°41′E
- Country: Russia
- Region: Bashkortostan
- District: Bakalinsky District
- Time zone: UTC+5:00

Derevnya penkozavoda (Russian: Деревня пенькозавода) is a rural locality (a village) in Diyashevsky Selsoviet, Bakalinsky District, Bashkortostan, Russia. The population was 129 as of 2010. There are 3 streets.

== Geography ==
The village is located 13 km southwest of Bakaly (the district's administrative centre) by road. Diyashevo is the nearest rural locality.
