= Staroye Azmeyevo =

Staroye Azmeyevo Старое Азмеево
- Selo
- Location within Bashkortostan Location within Russia
- Coordinates: 55°09′N 53°34′E
- Country: Russia
- Region: Bashkortostan
- District: Bakalinsky District
- Time zone: UTC+5:00

Staroye Azmeyevo (Russian: Старое Азмеево; Bashkir: Иҫке Әзмей, İśke Äzmey) is a rural locality (a selo) in Diyashevsky Selsoviet, Bakalinsky District, Bashkortostan, Russia. The population was 343 as of 2010. There are 3 streets.

== Geography ==
Staroye Azmeyevo is located 26 km west of Bakaly (the district's administrative centre) by road. Novoye Azmeyevo is the nearest rural locality.
