= Starokuyanovo =

Starokuyanovo Старокуяново
- Selo
- Location within Bashkortostan Location within Russia
- Coordinates: 55°06′N 53°50′E
- Country: Russia
- Region: Bashkortostan
- District: Bakalinsky District
- Time zone: UTC+5:00

Starokuyanovo (Russian: Старокуяново; Bashkir: Иҫке Ҡуян, İśke Quyan) is a rural locality (a selo) in Bakalinsky Selsoviet, Bakalinsky District, Bashkortostan, Russia. The population was 379 as of 2010. There are 4 streets.

== Geography ==
Starokuyanovo is located 11 km southeast of Bakaly (the district's administrative centre) by road. Tokberdino is the nearest rural locality.
