= Novy Tumutuk =

Novy Tumutuk Новый Тумутук
- Selo
- Location within Bashkortostan Location within Russia
- Coordinates: 55°02′N 53°22′E
- Country: Russia
- Region: Bashkortostan
- District: Bakalinsky District
- Time zone: UTC+5:00

Novy Tumutuk (Russian: Новый Тумутук; Bashkir: Яңы Тымытыҡ, Yañı Tımıtıq) is a rural locality (a selo) in Kushtiryakovsky Selsoviet, Bakalinsky District, Bashkortostan, Russia. The population was 190 as of 2010. There are 3 streets.

== Geography ==
Novy Tumutuk is located 44 km southwest of Bakaly (the district's administrative centre) by road. Kushtiryakovo is the nearest rural locality.
