= Batrak =

Batrak Батрак
- Selo
- Location within Bashkortostan Location within Russia
- Coordinates: 55°07′N 53°14′E
- Country: Russia
- Region: Bashkortostan
- District: Bakalinsky District
- Time zone: UTC+5:00

Batrak (Russian: Батрак) is a rural locality (a selo) in Novoursayevsky Selsoviet, Bakalinsky District, Bashkortostan, Russia. The population was 39 as of 2010. There is 1 street.

== Geography ==
Batrak is located 46 km west of Bakaly (the district's administrative centre) by road. Nagaybakovo is the nearest rural locality.
