= Unechsky =

Unechsky (masculine), Unechskaya (feminine), or Unechskoye (neuter) may refer to:

- Unechsky District, a district of Bryansk Oblast, Russia
- Unechsky Urban Administrative Okrug, an administrative division which the town of Unecha and six rural localities in Unechsky District of Bryansk Oblast, Russia are incorporated as
- Unechskoye Urban Settlement, a municipal formation which Unechsky Urban Administrative Okrug in Unechsky District of Bryansk Oblast, Russia is incorporated as
