= Novoalmetyevo =

Novoalmetyevo Новоальметьево
- Village
- Location within Bashkortostan Location within Russia
- Coordinates: 55°17′N 53°43′E
- Country: Russia
- Region: Bashkortostan
- District: Bakalinsky District
- Time zone: UTC+5:00

Novoalmetyevo (Russian: Новоальметьево; Bashkir: Яңы Әлмәт, Yañı Älmät) is a rural locality (a village) in Kileyevsky Selsoviet, Bakalinsky District, Bashkortostan, Russia. The population was 135 as of 2010. There is 1 street.

== Geography ==
Novoalmetyevo is located 20 km north of Bakaly (the district's administrative centre) by road. Zirikly is the nearest rural locality.
