= Starokatayevo =

Starokatayevo Старокатаево
- Selo
- Location within Bashkortostan Location within Russia
- Coordinates: 55°10′N 53°56′E
- Country: Russia
- Region: Bashkortostan
- District: Bakalinsky District
- Time zone: UTC+5:00

Starokatayevo (Russian: Старокатаево; Bashkir: Иҫке Ҡатай, İśke Qatay) is a rural locality (a selo) in Novokatayevsky Selsoviet, Bakalinsky District, Bashkortostan, Russia. The population was 543 as of 2010. There are 12 streets.

== Geography ==
Starokatayevo is located 10 km east of Bakaly (the district's administrative centre) by road. Novokatayevo is the nearest rural locality.
