= Palchikovo =

Palchikovo Пальчиково
- Village
- Location within Bashkortostan Location within Russia
- Coordinates: 55°02′N 53°33′E
- Country: Russia
- Region: Bashkortostan
- District: Bakalinsky District
- Time zone: UTC+5:00

Palchikovo (Russian: Пальчиково) is a rural locality (a village) in Mustafinsky Selsoviet, Bakalinsky District, Bashkortostan, Russia. The population was 16 as of 2010. There is 1 street.

== Geography ==
Palchikovo is located 28 km southwest of Bakaly (the district's administrative centre) by road. Mustafino is the nearest rural locality.
