= Galiullinka =

Galiullinka Галиуллинка
- Village
- Location within Bashkortostan Location within Russia
- Coordinates: 55°11′N 53°33′E
- Country: Russia
- Region: Bashkortostan
- District: Bakalinsky District
- Time zone: UTC+5:00

Galiullinka (Russian: Галиуллинка; Bashkir: Ғәлиулла, Ğäliulla; Tatar: Галиулла, Ğaliulla) is a rural locality (a village) in Diyashevsky Selsoviet, Bakalinsky District, Bashkortostan, Russia. The population was 9 as of 2010. There is 1 street.

== Geography ==
Galiullinka is located 19 km west of Bakaly (the district's administrative centre) by road. Bayukovo is the nearest rural locality.
