= Pozh =

Pozh Пож
- Village
- Location within Perm Krai Location within Russia
- Coordinates: 59°25′N 54°38′E
- Country: Russia
- Region: Perm Krai
- District: Yurlinsky District
- Time zone: UTC+5:00

Pozh (Russian: Пож) is a rural locality (a village) in Ust-Zulinskoye Rural Settlement, Yurlinsky District, Perm Krai, Russia. The population was 220 as of 2010. There are 4 streets.

== Geography ==
Pozh is located 26 km northeast of Yurla (the district's administrative centre) by road. Timina is the nearest rural locality.
