= Yeloga =

Yeloga Елога
- Village
- Location within Perm Krai Location within Russia
- Coordinates: 59°20′N 53°54′E
- Country: Russia
- Region: Perm Krai
- District: Yurlinsky District
- Time zone: UTC+5:00

Yeloga (Russian: Елога) is a rural locality (a village) in Yurlinskoye Rural Settlement, Yurlinsky District, Perm Krai, Russia. The population was 220 as of 2010. There are 5 streets.

== Geography ==
Yeloga is located 29 km west of Yurla (the district's administrative centre) by road. Mukhomorka is the nearest rural locality.
