= Sazonovka =

Sazonovka Сазоновка
- Village
- Location within Bashkortostan Location within Russia
- Coordinates: 55°18′N 53°57′E
- Country: Russia
- Region: Bashkortostan
- District: Bakalinsky District
- Time zone: UTC+5:00

Sazonovka (Russian: Сазоновка) is a rural locality (a village) in Staromatinsky Selsoviet, Bakalinsky District, Bashkortostan, Russia. The population was 12 as of 2010. There is 1 street.

== Geography ==
Sazonovka is located 22 km northeast of Bakaly (the district's administrative centre) by road. Yana-Turmush is the nearest rural locality.
