= Pestereva =

Pestereva Пестерева
- Village
- Location within Perm Krai Location within Russia
- Coordinates: 59°27′N 54°30′E
- Country: Russia
- Region: Perm Krai
- District: Yurlinsky District
- Time zone: UTC+5:00

Pestereva (Russian: Пестерева) is a rural locality (a village) in Ust-Zulinskoye Rural Settlement, Yurlinsky District, Perm Krai, Russia. The population was 81 as of 2010. There are 3 streets.

== Geography ==
Pestereva is located 20 km northeast of Yurla (the district's administrative centre) by road. Demidova is the nearest rural locality.
