= Syuzva =

Syuzva Сюзьва
- Settlement
- Location within Perm Krai Location within Russia
- Coordinates: 59°21′N 53°21′E
- Country: Russia
- Region: Perm Krai
- District: Yurlinsky District
- Time zone: UTC+5:00

Syuzva (Russian: Сюзьва) is a rural locality (a settlement) in Ust-Berezovskoye Rural Settlement, Yurlinsky District, Perm Krai, Russia. The population was 85 as of 2010. There are 2 streets.

== Geography ==
Syuzva is located 67 km west of Yurla (the district's administrative centre) by road. Galechnik is the nearest rural locality.
