= Suyundyukovo =

Suyundyukovo Суюндюково
- Selo
- Location within Bashkortostan Location within Russia
- Coordinates: 54°56′N 53°30′E
- Country: Russia
- Region: Bashkortostan
- District: Bakalinsky District
- Time zone: UTC+5:00

Suyundyukovo (Russian: Суюндюково; Bashkir: Һөйөндөк, Höyöndök) is a rural locality (a selo) in Urmanayevsky Selsoviet, Bakalinsky District, Bashkortostan, Russia. The population was 147 as of 2010. There are 3 streets.

== Geography ==
Suyundyukovo is located 43 km southwest of Bakaly (the district's administrative centre) by road. Urmanayevo is the nearest rural locality.
