= Kelich =

Kelich Келич
- Village
- Location within Perm Krai Location within Russia
- Coordinates: 59°26′N 54°09′E
- Country: Russia
- Region: Perm Krai
- District: Yurlinsky District
- Time zone: UTC+5:00

Kelich (Russian: Келич) is a rural locality (a village) in Yurlinskoye Rural Settlement, Yurlinsky District, Perm Krai, Russia. The population was 177 as of 2010. There are 5 streets.

== Geography ==
Kelich is located 20 km northwest of Yurla (the district's administrative centre) by road. Detkina is the nearest rural locality.
