= Chuzhya =

Chuzhya Чужья
- Village
- Location within Perm Krai Location within Russia
- Coordinates: 59°25′N 54°14′E
- Country: Russia
- Region: Perm Krai
- District: Yurlinsky District
- Time zone: UTC+5:00

Chuzhya (Russian: Чужья) is a rural locality (a village) in Yurlinskoye Rural Settlement, Yurlinsky District, Perm Krai, Russia. The population was 183 as of 2010. There are 4 streets.

== Geography ==
Chuzhya is located 14 km north of Yurla (the district's administrative centre) by road. Loinskaya is the nearest rural locality.
