= Vyatchina =

Vyatchina Вятчина
- Village
- Location within Perm Krai Location within Russia
- Coordinates: 59°16′31″N 54°31′59″E
- Country: Russia
- Region: Perm Krai
- District: Yurlinsky District
- Time zone: UTC+5:00

Vyatchina (Russian: Вятчина) is a rural locality (a village) in Yurlinskoye Rural Settlement, Yurlinsky District, Perm Krai, Russia. The population was 131 as of 2010. There are 2 streets.

== Geography ==
Vyatchina is located 21 km southeast of Yurla (the district's administrative centre) by road. Polukhina is the nearest rural locality.
