= Bukreyeva =

Bukreyeva Букреева
- Village
- Location within Perm Krai Location within Russia
- Coordinates: 59°26′N 54°30′E
- Country: Russia
- Region: Perm Krai
- District: Yurlinsky District
- Time zone: UTC+5:00

Bukreyeva (Russian: Букреева) is a rural locality (a village) in Ust-Zulinskoye Rural Settlement, Yurlinsky District, Perm Krai, Russia. The population was 80 as of 2010. There are 3 streets.

== Geography ==
Bukreyeva is located 19 km northeast of Yurla (the district's administrative centre) by road. Ust-Zula is the nearest rural locality.
