= Taktagulovo, Bakalinsky District, Republic of Bashkortostan =

Taktagulovo Тактагулово
- Selo
- Location within Bashkortostan Location within Russia
- Coordinates: 55°13′N 54°12′E
- Country: Russia
- Region: Bashkortostan
- District: Bakalinsky District
- Time zone: UTC+5:00

Taktagulovo (Russian: Тактагулово; Bashkir: Туҡтағол, Tuqtağol) is a rural locality (a selo) and the administrative centre of Taktagulovsky Selsoviet, Bakalinsky District, Bashkortostan, Russia. The population was 409 as of 2010. There are 6 streets.

== Geography ==
Taktagulovo is located 37 km east of Bakaly (the district's administrative centre) by road. Kamayevo is the nearest rural locality.
