= Kushtiryakovo =

Kushtiryakovo Куштиряково
- Selo
- Location within Bashkortostan Location within Russia
- Coordinates: 55°01′N 53°24′E
- Country: Russia
- Region: Bashkortostan
- District: Bakalinsky District
- Time zone: UTC+5:00

Kushtiryakovo (Russian: Куштиряково; Bashkir: Ҡуштирәк, Quştiräk) is a rural locality (a selo) and the administrative centre of Kushtiryakovsky Selsoviet, Bakalinsky District, Bashkortostan, Russia. The population was 345 as of 2010. There are 6 streets.

== Geography ==
Kushtiryakovo is located 39 km southwest of Bakaly (the district's administrative centre) by road. Kuk-Tyaka is the nearest rural locality.
