= Vesyolaya Polyana =

Vesyolaya Polyana Весёлая Поляна
- Village
- Location within Bashkortostan Location within Russia
- Coordinates: 55°10′N 53°26′E
- Country: Russia
- Region: Bashkortostan
- District: Bakalinsky District
- Time zone: UTC+5:00

Vesyolaya Polyana (Russian: Весёлая Поляна) is a rural locality (a village) in Starokosteyevsky Selsoviet, Bakalinsky District, Bashkortostan, Russia. The population was 5 as of 2010. There is 1 street.

== Geography ==
Vesyolaya Polyana is located 29 km west of Bakaly (the district's administrative centre) by road. Yurminka is the nearest rural locality.
