= Novoye Azmeyevo =

Novoye Azmeyevo Новое Азмеево
- Village
- Location within Bashkortostan Location within Russia
- Coordinates: 55°09′N 53°37′E
- Country: Russia
- Region: Bashkortostan
- District: Bakalinsky District
- Time zone: UTC+5:00

Novoye Azmeyevo (Russian: Новое Азмеево; Bashkir: Яңы Әзмей, Yañı Äzmey) is a rural locality (a village) in Diyashevsky Selsoviet, Bakalinsky District, Bashkortostan, Russia. The population was 77 as of 2010. There is 1 street.

== Geography ==
Novoye Azmeyevo is located 24 km west of Bakaly (the district's administrative centre) by road. Staroye Azmeyevo is the nearest rural locality.
