= Narat-Yelga =

Narat-Yelga Нарат-Елга
- Selo
- Location within Bashkortostan Location within Russia
- Coordinates: 54°59′N 53°40′E
- Country: Russia
- Region: Bashkortostan
- District: Bakalinsky District
- Time zone: UTC+5:00

Narat-Yelga (Russian: Нарат-Елга; Bashkir: Наратйылға, Naratyılğa) is a rural locality (a selo) in Mustafinsky Selsoviet, Bakalinsky District, Bashkortostan, Russia. The population was 120 as of 2010. There are 3 streets.

== Geography ==
Narat-Yelga is located 27 km southwest of Bakaly (the district's administrative centre) by road. Ustyumovo is the nearest rural locality.
