= Ust-Zula =

Ust-Zula Усть-Зула
- Selo
- Location within Perm Krai Location within Russia
- Coordinates: 59°26′N 54°29′E
- Country: Russia
- Region: Perm Krai
- District: Yurlinsky District
- Time zone: UTC+5:00

Ust-Zula (Russian: Усть-Зула) is a rural locality (a selo) and the administrative center of Ust-Zulinskoye Rural Settlement, Yurlinsky District, Perm Krai, Russia. The population was 222 as of 2010. There are 4 streets.

== Geography ==
Ust-Zula is located 18 km northeast of Yurla (the district's administrative centre) by road. Novoselova is the nearest rural locality.
