= Bolshaya Polovina =

Bolshaya Polovina Большая Половина
- Village
- Location within Perm Krai Location within Russia
- Coordinates: 59°19′N 54°31′E
- Country: Russia
- Region: Perm Krai
- District: Yurlinsky District
- Time zone: UTC+5:00

Bolshaya Polovina (Russian: Большая Половина) is a rural locality (a village) in Yurlinskoye Rural Settlement, Yurlinsky District, Perm Krai, Russia. The population was 116 as of 2010. There are 2 streets.

== Geography ==
Bolshaya Polovina is located 17 km east of Yurla (the district's administrative centre) by road. Anankina is the nearest rural locality.
