= Novoagbyazovo =

Novoagbyazovo Новоагбязово
- Village
- Location within Bashkortostan Location within Russia
- Coordinates: 55°16′N 53°42′E
- Country: Russia
- Region: Bashkortostan
- District: Bakalinsky District
- Time zone: UTC+5:00

Novoagbyazovo (Russian: Новоагбязово; Bashkir: Яңы Әғбәз, Yañı Äğbäz) is a rural locality (a village) in Starosharashlinsky Selsoviet, Bakalinsky District, Bashkortostan, Russia. The population was 197 as of 2010. There are 3 streets.

== Geography ==
Novoagbyazovo is located 14 km northwest of Bakaly (the district's administrative centre) by road. Novoalmetyevo is the nearest rural locality.
