= Yultimirovka =

Yultimirovka Юльтимировка
- Village
- Location within Bashkortostan Location within Russia
- Coordinates: 55°08′N 53°39′E
- Country: Russia
- Region: Bashkortostan
- District: Bakalinsky District
- Time zone: UTC+5:00

Yultimirovka (Russian: Юльтимировка; Bashkir: Юлтимер, Yultimer) is a rural locality (a village) in Diyashevsky Selsoviet, Bakalinsky District, Bashkortostan, Russia. The population was 274 as of 2010. There are 2 streets.

== Geography ==
Yultimirovka is located 21 km southwest of Bakaly (the district's administrative centre) by road. Mikhaylovka is the nearest rural locality.
