= Novokuruchevo =

Novokuruchevo Новокуручево
- Selo
- Location within Bashkortostan Location within Russia
- Coordinates: 55°04′N 54°02′E
- Country: Russia
- Region: Bashkortostan
- District: Bakalinsky District
- Time zone: UTC+5:00

Novokuruchevo (Russian: Новокуручево; Bashkir: Яңы Ҡорос, Yañı Qoros) is a rural locality (a selo) in Starokuruchevsky Selsoviet, Bakalinsky District, Bashkortostan, Russia. The population was 72 as of 2010. There is 1 street.

== Geography ==
Novokuruchevo is located 25 km southeast of Bakaly (the district's administrative centre) by road. Akhmerovo is the nearest rural locality.
