= Karpovka, Republic of Bashkortostan =

Karpovka Карповка
- Selo
- Location within Bashkortostan Location within Russia
- Coordinates: 55°04′N 53°18′E
- Country: Russia
- Region: Bashkortostan
- District: Bakalinsky District
- Time zone: UTC+5:00

Karpovka (Russian: Карповка) is a rural locality (a selo) in Kushtiryakovsky Selsoviet, Bakalinsky District, Bashkortostan, Russia. The population was 38 as of 2010. There are 3 streets.

== Geography ==
Karpovka is located 50 km southwest of Bakaly (the district's administrative centre) by road. Ursayevo is the nearest rural locality.
