= Chugaynov Khutor =

Chugaynov Khutor Чугайнов Хутор
- Settlement
- Location within Perm Krai Location within Russia
- Coordinates: 59°22′N 54°47′E
- Country: Russia
- Region: Perm Krai
- District: Yurlinsky District
- Time zone: UTC+5:00

Chugaynov Khutor (Russian: Чугайнов Хутор) is a rural locality (a settlement) in Ust-Zulinskoye Rural Settlement, Yurlinsky District, Perm Krai, Russia. The population was 169 as of 2010. There are 4 streets.

== Geography ==
Chugaynov Khutor is located 37 km east of Yurla (the district's administrative centre) by road. Pozh is the nearest rural locality.
