= Nizhneye Novokosteyevo =

Nizhneye Novokosteyevo Нижнее Новокостеево
- Village
- Location within Bashkortostan Location within Russia
- Coordinates: 55°01′N 53°48′E
- Country: Russia
- Region: Bashkortostan
- District: Bakalinsky District
- Time zone: UTC+5:00

Nizhneye Novokosteyevo (Russian: Нижнее Новокостеево; Bashkir: Түбәнге Яңы Кәстәй, Tübänge Yañı Kästäy) is a rural locality (a village) in Mikhaylovsky Selsoviet, Bakalinsky District, Bashkortostan, Russia. The population was 14 as of 2010. There are 2 streets.

== Geography ==
Nizhneye Novokosteyevo is located 27 km south of Bakaly (the district's administrative centre) by road. Chumalya is the nearest rural locality.
