= Kilkabyzovo =

Kilkabyzovo Килькабызово
- Selo
- Location within Bashkortostan Location within Russia
- Coordinates: 55°08′N 53°59′E
- Country: Russia
- Region: Bashkortostan
- District: Bakalinsky District
- Time zone: UTC+5:00

Kilkabyzovo (Russian: Килькабызово; Bashkir: Килкабыҙ, Kilkabıź) is a rural locality (a selo) in Starokuruchevsky Selsoviet, Bakalinsky District, Bashkortostan, Russia. The population was 358 in 2010. There are eight streets.

== Geography ==
Kilkabyzovo is located 17 kilometres (11 mi) southeast of Bakaly (the district's administrative centre) by road. Starokuruchevo is the nearest rural locality.
