= Tally-Syza =

Tally-Syza Таллы-Сыза
- Selo
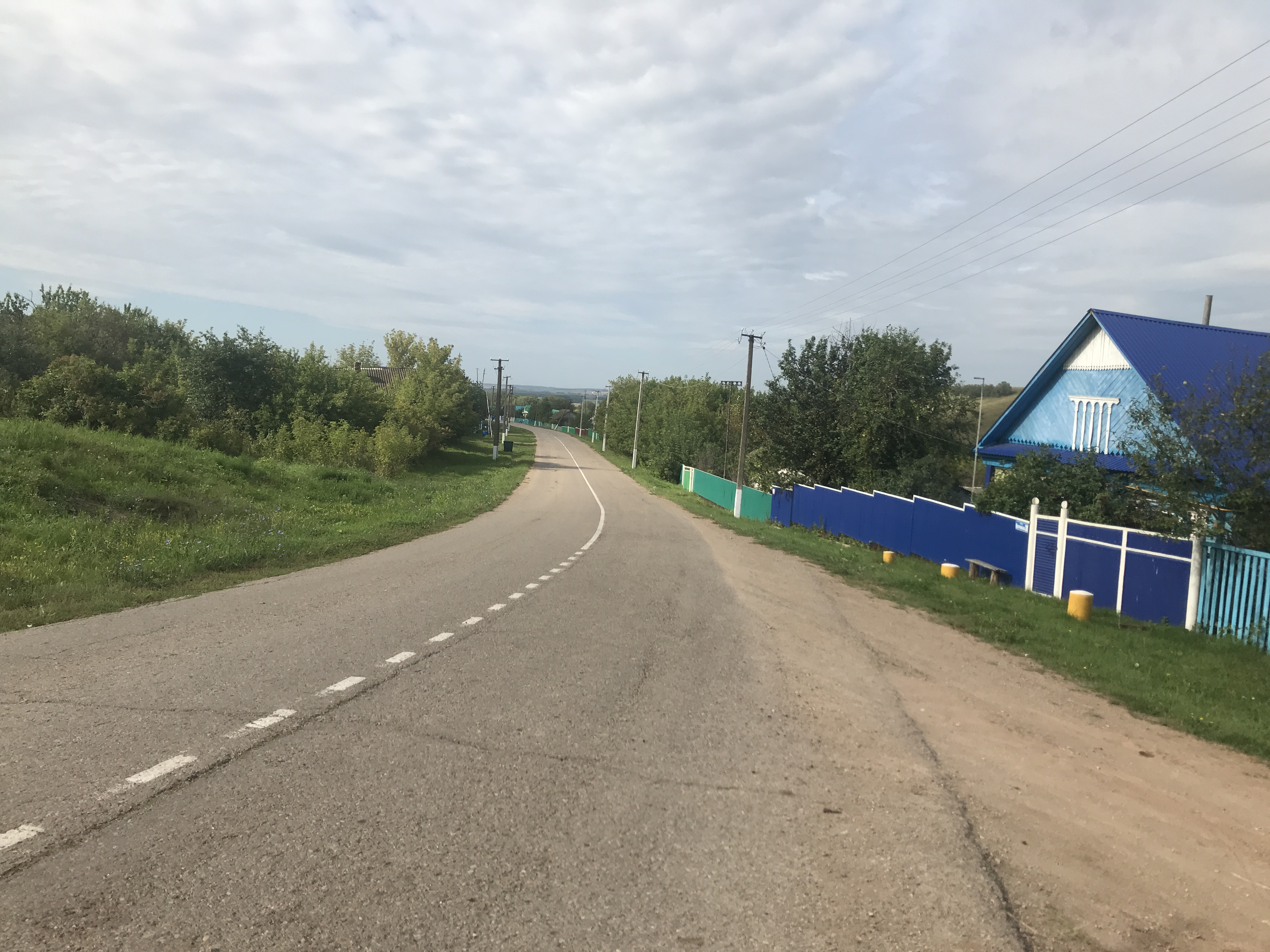
- Tally Syza

- Location within Bashkortostan Location within Russia
- Coordinates: 54°58′N 53°28′E
- Country: Russia
- Region: Bashkortostan
- District: Bakalinsky District
- Time zone: UTC+5:00

Tally-Syza (Russian: Таллы-Сыза; Bashkir: Таллыһыҙа, Tallıhıźa) is a rural locality (a selo) in Urmanayevsky Selsoviet, Bakalinsky District, Bashkortostan, Russia. The population was 147 as of 2010. There are 3 streets.

== Geography ==
Tally-Syza is located 33 km southwest of Bakaly (the district's administrative centre) by road. Sarly is the nearest rural locality.
