= Vorsinka =

Vorsinka Ворсинка
- Village
- Location within Bashkortostan Location within Russia
- Coordinates: 55°17′N 54°02′E
- Country: Russia
- Region: Bashkortostan
- District: Bakalinsky District
- Time zone: UTC+5:00

Vorsinka (Russian: Ворсинка) is a rural locality (a village) in Staromatinsky Selsoviet, Bakalinsky District, Bashkortostan, Russia. The population was 14 as of 2010. There is 1 street.

== Geography ==
Vorsinka is located 23 km northeast of Bakaly (the district's administrative centre) by road. Krasnaya Gorka is the nearest rural locality.
