= Novyye Sharashli =

Novyye Sharashli Новые Шарашли
- Village
- Location within Bashkortostan Location within Russia
- Coordinates: 55°13′N 53°43′E
- Country: Russia
- Region: Bashkortostan
- District: Bakalinsky District
- Time zone: UTC+5:00

Novyye Sharashli (Russian: Новые Шарашли; Bashkir: Яңы Шәрәшле, Yañı Şäräşle) is a rural locality (a village) in Starosharashlinsky Selsoviet, Bakalinsky District, Bashkortostan, Russia. The population was 36 as of 2010. There is 1 street.

== Geography ==
Novyye Sharashli is located 9 km northwest of Bakaly (the district's administrative centre) by road. Georgiyevka is the nearest rural locality.
