= Urmanayevo =

Urmanayevo Урманаево
- Selo
- Location within Bashkortostan Location within Russia
- Coordinates: 54°55′N 53°31′E
- Country: Russia
- Region: Bashkortostan
- District: Bakalinsky District
- Time zone: UTC+5:00

Urmanayevo (Russian: Урманаево; Bashkir: Урманай, Urmanay) is a rural locality (a selo) and the administrative center of Urmanayevsky Selsoviet, Bakalinsky District, Bashkortostan, Russia. The population was 256 as of 2010. There are 4 streets.

== Geography ==
Urmanayevo is located 39 km southwest of Bakaly (the district's administrative centre) by road. Suyundyukovo is the nearest rural locality.
