= Novoostankovo =

Novoostankovo Новоостанково
- Village
- Location within Bashkortostan Location within Russia
- Coordinates: 55°02′N 54°06′E
- Country: Russia
- Region: Bashkortostan
- District: Bakalinsky District
- Time zone: UTC+5:00

Novoostankovo (Russian: Новоостанково) is a rural locality (a village) in Starokuruchevsky Selsoviet, Bakalinsky District, Bashkortostan, Russia. The population was 12 as of 2010. There are 2 streets.

== Geography ==
Novoostankovo is located 31 km southeast of Bakaly (the district's administrative centre) by road. Balchikly is the nearest rural locality.
