= Plodoyagodnaya =

Plodoyagodnaya Плодоягодная
- Village
- Location within Bashkortostan Location within Russia
- Coordinates: 55°08′N 53°48′E
- Country: Russia
- Region: Bashkortostan
- District: Bakalinsky District
- Time zone: UTC+5:00

Plodoyagodnaya (Russian: Плодоягодная; Bashkir: Емеш-еләк, Yemeş-yeläk) is a rural locality (a village) in Bakalinsky Selsoviet, Bakalinsky District, Bashkortostan, Russia. The population was 189 as of 2010. There are 4 streets.

== Geography ==
Plodoyagodnaya is located 5 km southeast of Bakaly (the district's administrative centre) by road. Urman is the nearest rural locality.
