= Verkhnyaya Lobanova =

Verkhnyaya Lobanova Верхняя Лобанова
- Village
- Location within Perm Krai Location within Russia
- Coordinates: 59°24′N 54°27′E
- Country: Russia
- Region: Perm Krai
- District: Yurlinsky District
- Time zone: UTC+5:00

Verkhnyaya Lobanova (Russian: Верхняя Лобанова) is a rural locality (a village) in Ust-Zulinskoye Rural Settlement, Yurlinsky District, Perm Krai, Russia. The population was 67 as of 2010. There are 3 streets.

== Geography ==
Verkhnyaya Lobanova is located 12 km northeast of Yurla (the district's administrative centre) by road. Mironova is the nearest rural locality.
