= Kileyevo =

Kileyevo Килеево
- Selo
- Location within Bashkortostan Location within Russia
- Coordinates: 55°16′N 53°50′E
- Country: Russia
- Region: Bashkortostan
- District: Bakalinsky District
- Time zone: UTC+5:00

Kileyevo (Russian: Килеево; Bashkir: Киләй, Kiläy) is a rural locality (a selo) and the administrative centre of Kileyevsky Selsoviet, Bakalinsky District, Bashkortostan, Russia. The population was 498 as of 2010. There are 10 streets.

== Geography ==
Kileyevo is located 13 km north of Bakaly (the district's administrative centre) by road. Umirovo is the nearest rural locality.
