= Novosasykul =

Novosasykul Новосасыкуль
- Village
- Location within Bashkortostan Location within Russia
- Coordinates: 54°59′N 53°26′E
- Country: Russia
- Region: Bashkortostan
- District: Bakalinsky District
- Time zone: UTC+5:00

Novosasykul (Russian: Новосасыкуль; Bashkir: Яңы Һаҫыҡкүл, Yañı Haśıqkül) is a rural locality (a village) in Kushtiryakovsky Selsoviet, Bakalinsky District, Bashkortostan, Russia. The population was 129 as of 2010. There are 3 streets.

== Geography ==
Novosasykul is located 36 km southwest of Bakaly (the district's administrative centre) by road. Bulyak is the nearest rural locality.
