= Mullanurovo =

Mullanurovo Мулланурово
- Village
- Location within Bashkortostan Location within Russia
- Coordinates: 55°14′N 54°03′E
- Country: Russia
- Region: Bashkortostan
- District: Bakalinsky District
- Time zone: UTC+5:00

Mullanurovo (Russian: Мулланурово; Bashkir: Мулланур, Mullanur) is a rural locality (a village) in Staromatinsky Selsoviet, Bakalinsky District, Bashkortostan, Russia. The population was 121 as of 2010. There is 1 street.

== Geography ==
Mullanurovo is located 23 km northeast of Bakaly (the district's administrative centre) by road. Novye Maty is the nearest rural locality.
