= Budyonnovets =

Budyonnovets Будённовец
- Village
- Location within Bashkortostan Location within Russia
- Coordinates: 55°02′N 53°51′E
- Country: Russia
- Region: Bashkortostan
- District: Bakalinsky District
- Time zone: UTC+5:00

Budyonnovets (Russian: Будённовец; Bashkir: Буденновсы, Budennovsı) is a rural locality (a village) in Mikhaylovsky Selsoviet, Bakalinsky District, Bashkortostan, Russia. The population was 71 as of 2010. There is 1 street.

== Geography ==
Budyonnovets is located 22 km south of Bakaly (the district's administrative centre) by road. Mikhaylovka is the nearest rural locality.
