= Novy Shugan =

Novy Shugan Новый Шуган
- Village
- Location within Bashkortostan Location within Russia
- Coordinates: 55°00′N 53°53′E
- Country: Russia
- Region: Bashkortostan
- District: Bakalinsky District
- Time zone: UTC+5:00

Novy Shugan (Russian: Новый Шуган; Bashkir: Яңы Шыуған, Yañı Şıwğan) is a rural locality (a village) in Mikhaylovsky Selsoviet, Bakalinsky District, Bashkortostan, Russia. The population was 124 as of 2010. There are 3 streets.

== Geography ==
Novy Shugan is located 24 km south of Bakaly (the district's administrative centre) by road. Mikhaylovka is the nearest rural locality.
