= Chumalya =

Chumalya Чумаля
- Village
- Location within Bashkortostan Location within Russia
- Coordinates: 55°01′N 53°48′E
- Country: Russia
- Region: Bashkortostan
- District: Bakalinsky District
- Time zone: UTC+5:00

Chumalya (Russian: Чумаля; Bashkir: Сүмәлә, Sümälä) is a rural locality (a village) in Mikhaylovsky Selsoviet, Bakalinsky District, Bashkortostan, Russia. The population was 65 as of 2010. There is 1 street.

== Geography ==
Chumalya is located 26 km south of Bakaly (the district's administrative centre) by road. Nizhneye Novokosteyevo is the nearest rural locality.
