= Umirovo =

Umirovo Умирово
- Selo
- Location within Bashkortostan Location within Russia
- Coordinates: 55°18′N 53°48′E
- Country: Russia
- Region: Bashkortostan
- District: Bakalinsky District
- Time zone: UTC+5:00

Umirovo (Russian: Умирово; Bashkir: Үмәр, Ümär) is a rural locality (a selo) in Kileyevsky Selsoviet, Bakalinsky District, Bashkortostan, Russia. The population was 471 as of 2010. There are 3 streets.

== Geography ==
Umirovo is located 16 km north of Bakaly (the district's administrative centre) by road. Kileyevo is the nearest rural locality.
