= Muncha-Yelga =

Muncha-Yelga Мунча-Елга
- Village
- Location within Bashkortostan Location within Russia
- Coordinates: 55°01′N 54°10′E
- Country: Russia
- Region: Bashkortostan
- District: Bakalinsky District
- Time zone: UTC+5:00

Muncha-Yelga (Russian: Мунча-Елга; Bashkir: Мунсайылға, Munsayılğa) is a rural locality (a village) in Starokuruchevsky Selsoviet, Bakalinsky District, Bashkortostan, Russia. The population was 30 as of 2010. There is 1 street.

== Geography ==
Muncha-Yelga is located 37 km southeast of Bakaly (the district's administrative centre) by road. Novochikeyevo is the nearest rural locality.
