= Ustyumovo =

Ustyumovo Устюмово
- Village
- Location within Bashkortostan Location within Russia
- Coordinates: 54°59′N 53°43′E
- Country: Russia
- Region: Bashkortostan
- District: Bakalinsky District
- Time zone: UTC+5:00

Ustyumovo (Russian: Устюмово; Bashkir: Үҫтем, Üśtem) is a rural locality (a village) in Kamyshlytamaksky Selsoviet, Bakalinsky District, Bashkortostan, Russia. The population was 179 as of 2010. There are 3 streets.

== Geography ==
Ustyumovo is located 25 km south of Bakaly (the district's administrative centre) by road. Utarovo is the nearest rural locality.
