= Kurcheyevo =

Kurcheyevo Курчеево
- Selo
- Location within Bashkortostan Location within Russia
- Coordinates: 55°04′N 53°29′E
- Country: Russia
- Region: Bashkortostan
- District: Bakalinsky District
- Time zone: UTC+5:00

Kurcheyevo (Russian: Курчеево; Bashkir: Күрсәй, Kürsäy) is a rural locality (a selo) in Buzyurovsky Selsoviet, Bakalinsky District, Bashkortostan, Russia. The population was 245 as of 2010. There are 2 streets.

== Geography ==
Kurcheyevo is located 31 km southwest of Bakaly (the district's administrative centre) by road. Buzyurovo is the nearest rural locality.
