= Titova, Perm Krai =

Titova Титова
- Village
- Location within Perm Krai Location within Russia
- Coordinates: 59°15′N 54°15′E
- Country: Russia
- Region: Perm Krai
- District: Yurlinsky District
- Time zone: UTC+5:00

Titova (Russian: Титова) is a rural locality (a village) in Yurlinskoye Rural Settlement, Yurlinsky District, Perm Krai, Russia. The population was 206 as of 2010. There are 5 streets.

== Geography ==
Titova is located 10 km southwest of Yurla (the district's administrative centre) by road. Fokina is the nearest rural locality.
