= Balchikly =

Balchikly Балчиклы
- Village
- Location within Bashkortostan Location within Russia
- Coordinates: 55°04′N 54°05′E
- Country: Russia
- Region: Bashkortostan
- District: Bakalinsky District
- Time zone: UTC+5:00

Balchikly (Russian: Балчиклы; Bashkir: Балсыҡлы, Balsıqlı) is a rural locality (a village) in Starokuruchevsky Selsoviet, Bakalinsky District, Bashkortostan, Russia. The population was 192 as of 2010. There are 2 streets.

== Geography ==
Balchikly is located 26 km southeast of Bakaly (the district's administrative centre) by road. Novokuruchevo is the nearest rural locality.
