= Demidova, Perm Krai =

Demidova Демидова
- Village
- Location within Perm Krai Location within Russia
- Coordinates: 59°27′N 54°29′E
- Country: Russia
- Region: Perm Krai
- District: Yurlinsky District
- Time zone: UTC+5:00

Demidova (Russian: Демидова) is a rural locality (a village) in Ust-Zulinskoye Rural Settlement, Yurlinsky District, Perm Krai, Russia. The population was 105 as of 2010. There are 2 streets.

== Geography ==
Demidova is located 19 km northeast of Yurla (the district's administrative centre) by road. Pestereva is the nearest rural locality.
