= Novokatayevo =

Novokatayevo Новокатаево
- Selo
- Location within Bashkortostan Location within Russia
- Coordinates: 55°10′N 53°56′E
- Country: Russia
- Region: Bashkortostan
- District: Bakalinsky District
- Time zone: UTC+5:00

Novokatayevo (Russian: Новокатаево; Bashkir: Яңы Ҡатай, Yañı Qatay) is a rural locality (a selo) and the administrative center of Novokatayevsky Selsoviet, Bakalinsky District, Bashkortostan, Russia. The population was 425 in 2010. There are six streets.

== Geography ==
Novokatayevo is located 11 km east of Bakaly (the district's administrative centre) by road. Starokatayevo is the nearest rural locality.
