= Starogusevo =

Starogusevo Старогусево
- Selo
- Location within Bashkortostan Location within Russia
- Coordinates: 55°04′N 54°11′E
- Country: Russia
- Region: Bashkortostan
- District: Bakalinsky District
- Time zone: UTC+5:00

Starogusevo (Russian: Старогусево) is a rural locality (a selo) in Starokuruchevsky Selsoviet, Bakalinsky District, Bashkortostan, Russia. The population was 306 as of 2010. There are 2 streets.

== Geography ==
Starogusevo is located 30 km southeast of Bakaly (the district's administrative centre) by road. Novogusevo is the nearest rural locality.
