= Kandalakbashevo =

Kandalakbashevo Кандалакбашево
- Village
- Location within Bashkortostan Location within Russia
- Coordinates: 55°11′N 54°08′E
- Country: Russia
- Region: Bashkortostan
- District: Bakalinsky District
- Time zone: UTC+5:00

Kandalakbashevo (Russian: Кандалакбашево; Bashkir: Ҡандалаҡбаш, Qandalaqbaş) is a rural locality (a village) in Taktagulovsky Selsoviet, Bakalinsky District, Bashkortostan, Russia. The population was 67 as of 2010. There are 2 streets.

== Geography ==
Kandalakbashevo is located 35 km east of Bakaly (the district's administrative centre) by road. Kamayevo is the nearest rural locality.
