= Akhmanovo =

Akhmanovo Ахманово
- Selo
- Location within Bashkortostan Location within Russia
- Coordinates: 55°08′N 53°43′E
- Country: Russia
- Region: Bashkortostan
- District: Bakalinsky District
- Time zone: UTC+5:00

Akhmanovo (Russian: Ахманово; Bashkir: Ахман, Axman) is a rural locality (a selo) and the administrative centre of Akhmanovsky Selsoviet, Bakalinsky District, Bashkortostan, Russia. The population was 476 as of 2010. There are 2 streets.

== Geography ==
Akhmanovo is located 9 km southwest of Bakaly (the district's administrative centre) by road. Starye Balykly is the nearest rural locality.
