= Starokosteyevo =

Starokosteyevo Старокостеево
- Selo
- Location within Bashkortostan Location within Russia
- Coordinates: 55°12′N 53°39′E
- Country: Russia
- Region: Bashkortostan
- District: Bakalinsky District
- Time zone: UTC+5:00

Starokosteyevo (Russian: Старокостеево; Bashkir: Иҫке Кәстәй, İśke Kästäy) is a rural locality (a selo) and the administrative center of Starokosteyevsky Selsoviet, Bakalinsky District, Bashkortostan, Russia. The population was 430 as of 2010. There are 3 streets.

== Geography ==
Starokosteyevo is located 12 km northwest of Bakaly (the district's administrative centre) by road. Novokosteyevo is the nearest rural locality.
