= Kazanchi, Bakalinsky District, Republic of Bashkortostan =

Kazanchi Казанчи
- Selo
- Location within Bashkortostan Location within Russia
- Coordinates: 55°12′N 53°29′E
- Country: Russia
- Region: Bashkortostan
- District: Bakalinsky District
- Time zone: UTC+5:00

Kazanchi (Russian: Казанчи; Bashkir: Ҡаҙансы, Qaźansı) is a rural locality (a selo) in Starokosteyevsky Selsoviet, Bakalinsky District, Bashkortostan, Russia. The population was 327 as of 2010. There are 4 streets.

== Geography ==
Kazanchi is located 22 km west of Bakaly (the district's administrative centre) by road. Galiullinka is the nearest rural locality.
