= Diyashevo =

Diyashevo Дияшево
- Selo
- Location within Bashkortostan Location within Russia
- Coordinates: 55°04′N 53°39′E
- Country: Russia
- Region: Bashkortostan
- District: Bakalinsky District
- Time zone: UTC+5:00

Diyashevo (Russian: Дияшево; Bashkir: Дияш, Diyaş) is a rural locality (a selo) in Diyashevsky Selsoviet, Bakalinsky District, Bashkortostan, Russia. The population was 375 as of 2010. There are 3 streets.

== Geography ==
Diyashevo is located 15 km southwest of Bakaly (the district's administrative centre) by road. Mikhaylovka is the nearest rural locality.
