= Berezova =

Berezova Березова
- Village
- Location within Perm Krai Location within Russia
- Coordinates: 59°22′N 53°49′E
- Country: Russia
- Region: Perm Krai
- District: Yurlinsky District
- Time zone: UTC+5:00

Berezova (Russian: Березова) is a rural locality (a village) in Yurlinskoye Rural Settlement, Yurlinsky District, Perm Krai, Russia. The population was 16 as of 2010. There are 3 streets.

== Geography ==
Berezova is located 59 km northwest of Yurla (the district's administrative centre) by road. Lipova is the nearest rural locality.
