= Novyye Maty =

Novyye Maty Новые Маты
- Selo
- Location within Bashkortostan Location within Russia
- Coordinates: 55°15′N 54°02′E
- Country: Russia
- Region: Bashkortostan
- District: Bakalinsky District
- Time zone: UTC+5:00

Novyye Maty (Russian: Новые Маты; Bashkir: Яңы Маты, Yañı Matı) is a rural locality (a selo) in Staromatinsky Selsoviet, Bakalinsky District, Bashkortostan, Russia. The population was 323 as of 2010. There are 4 streets.

== Geography ==
Novyye Maty is located 21 km northeast of Bakaly (the district's administrative centre) by road. Mullanurovo is the nearest rural locality.
