= Staroilikovo =

Staroilikovo Староиликово
- Selo
- Location within Bashkortostan Location within Russia
- Coordinates: 55°19′N 53°52′E
- Country: Russia
- Region: Bashkortostan
- District: Bakalinsky District
- Time zone: UTC+5:00

Staroilikovo (Russian: Староиликово; Bashkir: Иҫке Илек, İśke İlek) is a rural locality (a selo) in Kileyevsky Selsoviet, Bakalinsky District, Bashkortostan, Russia. The population was 147 as of 2010. There are 2 streets.

== Geography ==
Staroilikovo is located 19 km north of Bakaly (the district's administrative centre) by road. Novoilikovo is the nearest rural locality.
