= Starye Maty =

Starye Maty Старые Маты
- Selo
- Location within Bashkortostan Location within Russia
- Coordinates: 55°14′N 53°56′E
- Country: Russia
- Region: Bashkortostan
- District: Bakalinsky District
- Time zone: UTC+5:00

Starye Maty (Russian: Старые Маты; Bashkir: Иҫке Маты, İśke Matı) is a rural locality (a selo) and the administrative center of Staromatinsky Selsoviet, Bakalinsky District, Bashkortostan, Russia. The population was 975 as of 2010. There are 16 streets.

== Geography ==
Starye Maty is located 13 km northeast of Bakaly (the district's administrative centre) by road. Dubrovka is the nearest rural locality.
