= Utarovo =

Utarovo Утарово
- Selo
- Location within Bashkortostan Location within Russia
- Coordinates: 54°59′N 53°45′E
- Country: Russia
- Region: Bashkortostan
- District: Bakalinsky District
- Time zone: UTC+5:00

Utarovo (Russian: Утарово; Bashkir: Утар, Utar) is a rural locality (a selo) in Mikhaylovsky Selsoviet, Bakalinsky District, Bashkortostan, Russia. The population was 207 as of 2010. There is 1 street.

== Geography ==
Utarovo is located 28 km south of Bakaly (the district's administrative centre) by road. Ustyumovo is the nearest rural locality.
