= Novoilikovo =

Novoilikovo Новоиликово
- Selo
- Location within Bashkortostan Location within Russia
- Coordinates: 55°20′N 53°53′E
- Country: Russia
- Region: Bashkortostan
- District: Bakalinsky District
- Time zone: UTC+5:00

Novoilikovo (Russian: Новоиликово; Bashkir: Яңы Илек, Yañı İlek) is a rural locality (a selo) in Kileyevsky Selsoviet, Bakalinsky District, Bashkortostan, Russia. The population was 369 as of 2010. There are 4 streets.

== Geography ==
Novoilikovo is located 21 km north of Bakaly (the district's administrative centre) by road. Syngryanovo is the nearest rural locality.
