= Novokosteyevo =

Novokosteyevo Новокостеево
- Village
- Location within Bashkortostan Location within Russia
- Coordinates: 55°12′N 53°42′E
- Country: Russia
- Region: Bashkortostan
- District: Bakalinsky District
- Time zone: UTC+5:00

Novokosteyevo (Russian: Новокостеево; Bashkir: Яңы Кәстәй, Yañı Kästäy) is a rural locality (a village) in Starosharashlinsky Selsoviet, Bakalinsky District, Bashkortostan, Russia. The population was 2 as of 2010. There is 1 street.

== Geography ==
Novokosteyevo is located 9 km northwest of Bakaly (the district's administrative centre) by road. Georgiyevka is the nearest rural locality.
