= Zirikly =

Zirikly Зириклы
- Village
- Location within Bashkortostan Location within Russia
- Coordinates: 55°18′N 53°42′E
- Country: Russia
- Region: Bashkortostan
- District: Bakalinsky District
- Time zone: UTC+5:00

Zirikly (Russian: Зириклы; Bashkir: Ерекле, Yerekle; Tatar: Зирекле, Zirekle) is a rural locality (a village) in Kileyevsky Selsoviet, Bakalinsky District, Bashkortostan, Russia. The population was 51 as of 2010. There is 1 street.

== Geography ==
Zirikly is located 23 km north of Bakaly (the district's administrative centre) by road. Novoalmetyevo is the nearest rural locality.
