= Akhmerovo, Bakalinsky District, Republic of Bashkortostan =

Akhmerovo Ахмерово
- Village
- Location within Bashkortostan Location within Russia
- Coordinates: 55°04′N 54°00′E
- Country: Russia
- Region: Bashkortostan
- District: Bakalinsky District
- Time zone: UTC+5:00

Akhmerovo (Russian: Ахмерово; Bashkir and Tatar: Әхмәр, Äxmär) is a rural locality (a village) in Starokuruchevsky Selsoviet, Bakalinsky District, Bashkortostan, Russia. The population was 41 as of 2010. There is 1 street.

== Geography ==
Akhmerovo is located 27 km southeast of Bakaly (the district's administrative centre) by road. Novokuruchevo is the nearest rural locality.
