= Dubrovka, Unechsky District, Bryansk Oblast =

Dubrovka Дубровка
- Village
- Location within Bryansk Oblast Location within Russia
- Coordinates: 52°55′N 33°03′E
- Country: Russia
- Region: Bryansk Oblast
- District: Unechsky District
- Time zone: UTC+3:00

Dubrovka (Russian: Дубровка) is a rural locality (a village) in Unechsky District, Bryansk Oblast, Russia. The population was 3 as of 2010. There are 3 streets.

== Geography ==
Dubrovka is located 56 km northeast of Unecha (the district's administrative centre) by road. Degtyanovo is the nearest rural locality.
