= Dubrovka, Bakalinsky District, Republic of Bashkortostan =

Dubrovka Дубровка
- Village
- Location within Bashkortostan Location within Russia
- Coordinates: 55°15′N 53°55′E
- Country: Russia
- Region: Bashkortostan
- District: Bakalinsky District
- Time zone: UTC+5:00

Dubrovka (Russian: Дубровка) is a rural locality (a village) in Staromatinsky Selsoviet, Bakalinsky District, Bashkortostan, Russia. The population was 13 as of 2010. There is 1 street.

== Geography ==
Dubrovka is located 18 km northeast of Bakaly (the district's administrative centre) by road. Kyzyl Bulyak is the nearest rural locality.
