= Petrovka, Novoursayevsky Selsoviet, Bakalinsky District, Republic of Bashkortostan =

Petrovka Петровка
- Selo
- Location within Bashkortostan Location within Russia
- Coordinates: 55°06′N 53°25′E
- Country: Russia
- Region: Bashkortostan
- District: Bakalinsky District
- Time zone: UTC+5:00

Petrovka (Russian: Петровка) is a rural locality (a selo) in Novoursayevsky Selsoviet, Bakalinsky District, Bashkortostan, Russia. The population was 11 as of 2010.

== Geography ==
It is located 35 km from Bakaly and 5 km from Novoursayevo.
