= Kamayevo, Urmanayevsky Selsoviet, Bakalinsky District, Republic of Bashkortostan =

Kamayevo Камаево
- Selo
- Location within Bashkortostan Location within Russia
- Coordinates: 55°11′N 54°12′E
- Country: Russia
- Region: Bashkortostan
- District: Bakalinsky District
- Time zone: UTC+5:00

Kamayevo (Russian: Камаево; Bashkir: Ҡамай, Qamay) is a rural locality (a selo) in Urmanayevsky Selsoviet, Bakalinsky District, Bashkortostan, Russia. The population was 136 as of 2010.

== Geography ==
It is located 47 km from Bakaly and 8 km from Urmanayevo.
