= Dubrovka, Yurlinsky District, Perm Krai =

Dubrovka Дубровка
- Village
- Location within Perm Krai Location within Russia
- Coordinates: 59°16′N 54°02′E
- Country: Russia
- Region: Perm Krai
- District: Yurlinsky District
- Time zone: UTC+5:00

Dubrovka (Russian: Дубровка) is a rural locality (a village) in Yurlinskoye Rural Settlement, Yurlinsky District, Perm Krai, Russia. The population was 190 as of 2010. There are 8 streets.

== Geography ==
Dubrovka is located 19 km southwest of Yurla (the district's administrative centre) by road. Vaskova is the nearest rural locality.
