= Dubrovka, Melenkovsky District, Vladimir Oblast =

Dubrovka Дубровка
- Village
- Location within Vladimir Oblast Location within Russia
- Coordinates: 55°30′N 41°28′E
- Country: Russia
- Region: Vladimir Oblast
- District: Melenkovsky District
- Time zone: UTC+3:00

Dubrovka (Russian: Дубро́вка) is a rural locality (a village) in Butylitskoye Rural Settlement, Melenkovsky District, Vladimir Oblast, Russia. The population was 24 as of 2010.

== Geography ==
Dubrovka is located 24 km (15 mi) north of Melenki (the district's administrative center) by road. Butylitsy is the nearest rural locality.
