= Dubrovka, Altai Republic =

Dubrovka Дубровка
- Settlement
- Location within Altai Republic Location within Russia
- Coordinates: 51°55′39″N 85°50′19″E
- Country: Russia
- Region: Altai Republic
- District: Mayminsky District
- Time zone: UTC+7:00

Dubrovka (Russian: Дубровка; Altay: Эрмендӱ, Ermendü) is a rural locality (a settlement) in Mayminskoye Rural Settlement of Mayminsky District, the Altai Republic, Russia. The population was 467 as of 2016. There are 14 streets.

== Geography ==
Dubrovka is located on the Katun River, 11 km southwest of Mayma (the district's administrative centre) by road. Rybalka is the nearest rural locality.
