= Akhmerovo, Beloretsky District, Republic of Bashkortostan =

Akhmerovo Ахмерово
- Village
- Location within Bashkortostan Location within Russia
- Coordinates: 53°50′N 57°33′E
- Country: Russia
- Region: Bashkortostan
- District: Beloretsky District
- Time zone: UTC+5:00

Akhmerovo (Russian: Ахмерово; Bashkir: Әхмәр, Äxmär) is a rural locality (a village) in Tukansky Selsoviet, Beloretsky District, Bashkortostan, Russia. The population was 24 as of 2010. There are 3 streets.

== Geography ==
Akhmerovo is located 74 km southwest of Beloretsk (the district's administrative centre) by road. Bzyak is the nearest rural locality.
