= Dubrovka, Ternovsky District, Voronezh Oblast =

Dubrovka Дубровка
- Settlement
- Location within Voronezh Oblast Location within Russia
- Coordinates: 51°37′N 41°08′E
- Country: Russia
- Region: Voronezh Oblast
- District: Ternovsky District
- Time zone: UTC+3:00

Dubrovka (Russian: Дубровка) is a rural locality (a settlement) and the administrative center of Kiselinskoye Rural Settlement, Ternovsky District, Voronezh Oblast, Russia. The population was 599 as of 2010. There are 3 streets.

== Geography ==
Dubrovka is located 45 km southwest of Ternovka (the district's administrative centre) by road. Kiselnoye is the nearest rural locality.
