= Akhmerovo, Baymaksky District, Republic of Bashkortostan =

Akhmerovo Ахмерово
- Village
- Location within Bashkortostan Location within Russia
- Coordinates: 52°49′N 58°31′E
- Country: Russia
- Region: Bashkortostan
- District: Baymaksky District
- Time zone: UTC+5:00

Akhmerovo (Russian: Ахмерово; Bashkir: Әхмәр, Äxmär) is a rural locality (a village) in Mukasovsky Selsoviet, Baymaksky District, Bashkortostan, Russia. The population was 543 as of 2010. There are 7 streets.

== Geography ==
Akhmerovo is located 57 km northeast of Baymak (the district's administrative centre) by road. 1-ye Turkmenevo is the nearest rural locality.
