= Dubrovka, Ustyuzhensky District, Vologda Oblast =

Dubrovka Дубровка
- Village
- Location within Vologda Oblast Location within Russia
- Coordinates: 58°46′N 36°13′E
- Country: Russia
- Region: Vologda Oblast
- District: Ustyuzhensky District
- Time zone: UTC+3:00

Dubrovka (Russian: Дубровка) is a rural locality (a village) in Zalesskoye Rural Settlement, Ustyuzhensky District, Vologda Oblast, Russia. As of 2002, the population was 33 .

== Geography ==
Dubrovka is located 20 km (12 mi) southwest of Ustyuzhna (the district's administrative centre) by road. Staroye Kvasovo is the nearest rural locality.
