= Dubrovka, Anninsky District, Voronezh Oblast =

Dubrovka Дубровка
- Settlement
- Location within Voronezh Oblast Location within Russia
- Coordinates: 51°23′N 40°48′E
- Country: Russia
- Region: Voronezh Oblast
- District: Anninsky District
- Time zone: UTC+3:00

Dubrovka (Russian: Дубровка) is a rural locality (a settlement) in Novozhiznenskoye Rural Settlement, Anninsky District, Voronezh Oblast, Russia. The population was 116 as of 2010. There are 3 streets.

== Geography ==
Dubrovka is located 34 km southeast of Anna (the district's administrative centre) by road. Novaya Zhizn is the nearest rural locality.
