= Butylitsy =

Butylitsy Бутылицы
- Selo
- Location within Vladimir Oblast Location within Russia
- Coordinates: 55°30′N 41°29′E
- Country: Russia
- Region: Vladimir Oblast
- District: Melenkovsky District
- Time zone: UTC+3:00

Butylitsy (Russian: Буты́лицы) is a rural locality (a selo) and the administrative center of Butylitskoye Rural Settlement, Melenkovsky District, Vladimir Oblast, Russia. The population was 1,171 as of 2010. There are 10 streets.

== Geography ==
Butylitsy is located 24 km (15 mi) north of Melenki (the district's administrative centre) by road. Dubrovka is the nearest rural locality.
