= Dubrovka, Amur Oblast =

Dubrovka Дубровка
- Selo
- Location within Amur Oblast Location within Russia
- Coordinates: 50°41′N 128°51′E
- Country: Russia
- Region: Amur Oblast
- District: Belogorsky District
- Time zone: UTC+9:00

Dubrovka (Russian: Дубровка) is a rural locality (a selo) in Amursky Selsoviet of Belogorsky District, Amur Oblast, Russia. The population was 62 as of 2018. There are 6 streets.

== Geography ==
Dubrovka is located 46 km southeast of Belogorsk (the district's administrative centre) by road. Vozzhayevka is the nearest rural locality.
