= Akhmerovo, Ishimbaysky District, Republic of Bashkortostan =

Akhmerovo Ахмерово
- Selo
- Location within Bashkortostan Location within Russia
- Coordinates: 53°35′N 56°12′E
- Country: Russia
- Region: Bashkortostan
- District: Ishimbaysky District
- Time zone: UTC+5:00

Akhmerovo (Russian: Ахме́рово; Bashkir: Әхмәр, Äxmär) is a rural locality (a selo) in Isheyevsky Selsoviet, Ishimbaysky District, Bashkortostan, Russia. The population was 984 as of 2010. There are 14 streets.

== Geography ==
Akhmerovo is located 24 km northeast of Ishimbay (the district's administrative centre) by road. Kanakayevo is the nearest rural locality.
