= Dubrovka, Kirzhachsky District, Vladimir Oblast =

Dubrovka Дубровка
- Village
- Location within Vladimir Oblast Location within Russia
- Coordinates: 56°12′N 38°45′E
- Country: Russia
- Region: Vladimir Oblast
- District: Kirzhachsky District
- Time zone: UTC+3:00

Dubrovka (Russian: Дубровка) is a rural locality (a village) in Gorkinskoye Rural Settlement, Kirzhachsky District, Vladimir Oblast, Russia. The population was 25 as of 2010. There are 3 streets.

== Geography ==
Dubrovka is located on the Sherna River, 13 km northwest of Kirzhach (the district's administrative centre) by road. Vasilyovo is the nearest rural locality.
