= Dubrovka, Petushinsky District, Vladimir Oblast =

Dubrovka Дубровка
- Village
- Location within Vladimir Oblast Location within Russia
- Coordinates: 55°51′N 39°11′E
- Country: Russia
- Region: Vladimir Oblast
- District: Petushinsky District
- Time zone: UTC+3:00

Dubrovka (Russian: Дубровка) is a rural locality (a village) in Nagornoye Rural Settlement, Petushinsky District, Vladimir Oblast, Russia. The population was 20 as of 2010. There are 3 streets.

== Geography ==
Dubrovka is located 31 km southwest of Petushki (the district's administrative centre) by road. Domashnevo is the nearest rural locality.
