= Akhmerovo, Aurgazinsky District, Republic of Bashkortostan =

Akhmerovo Ахмерово
- Village
- Location within Bashkortostan Location within Russia
- Coordinates: 54°13′N 55°58′E
- Country: Russia
- Region: Bashkortostan
- District: Aurgazinsky District
- Time zone: UTC+5:00

Akhmerovo (Russian: Ахмерово; Bashkir: Әхмәр, Äxmär) is a rural locality (a village) in Ishlinsky Selsoviet, Aurgazinsky District, Bashkortostan, Russia. The population was 67 as of 2010. There are 3 streets.

== Geography ==
Akhmerovo is located 29 km north of Tolbazy (the district's administrative centre) by road. Novotimoshkino is the nearest rural locality.
