= Dubrovka, Gavrilovo-Posadsky District, Ivanovo Oblast =

Dubrovka Дубровка
- Selo
- Location within Ivanovo Oblast Location within Russia
- Coordinates: 56°35′N 40°02′E
- Country: Russia
- Region: Ivanovo Oblast
- District: Gavrilovo-Posadsky District
- Time zone: UTC+3:00

Dubrovka (Russian: Дубровка) is a rural locality (a selo) in Gavrilovo-Posadsky District, Ivanovo Oblast, Russia. Population: 39 (2010 census);

== Geography ==
This rural locality is located 7 km from Gavrilov Posad (the district's administrative centre), 73 km from Ivanovo (capital of Ivanovo Oblast) and 175 km from Moscow. Novoselka is the nearest rural locality.
