= Dubrovka, Karaidelsky District, Republic of Bashkortostan =

Dubrovka Дубровка
- Village
- Location within Bashkortostan Location within Russia
- Coordinates: 55°38′N 56°36′E
- Country: Russia
- Region: Bashkortostan
- District: Karaidelsky District
- Time zone: UTC+5:00

Dubrovka (Russian: Дубровка) is a rural locality (a village) in Urgushevsky Selsoviet, Karaidelsky District, Bashkortostan, Russia. The population was 110 as of 2010. There are 4 streets.

== Geography ==
Dubrovka is located 44 km southwest of Karaidel (the district's administrative centre) by road. Atnyashkino is the nearest rural locality.
