= Unecha =

Town in Bryansk Oblast, Russia

Unecha Унеча
- Town
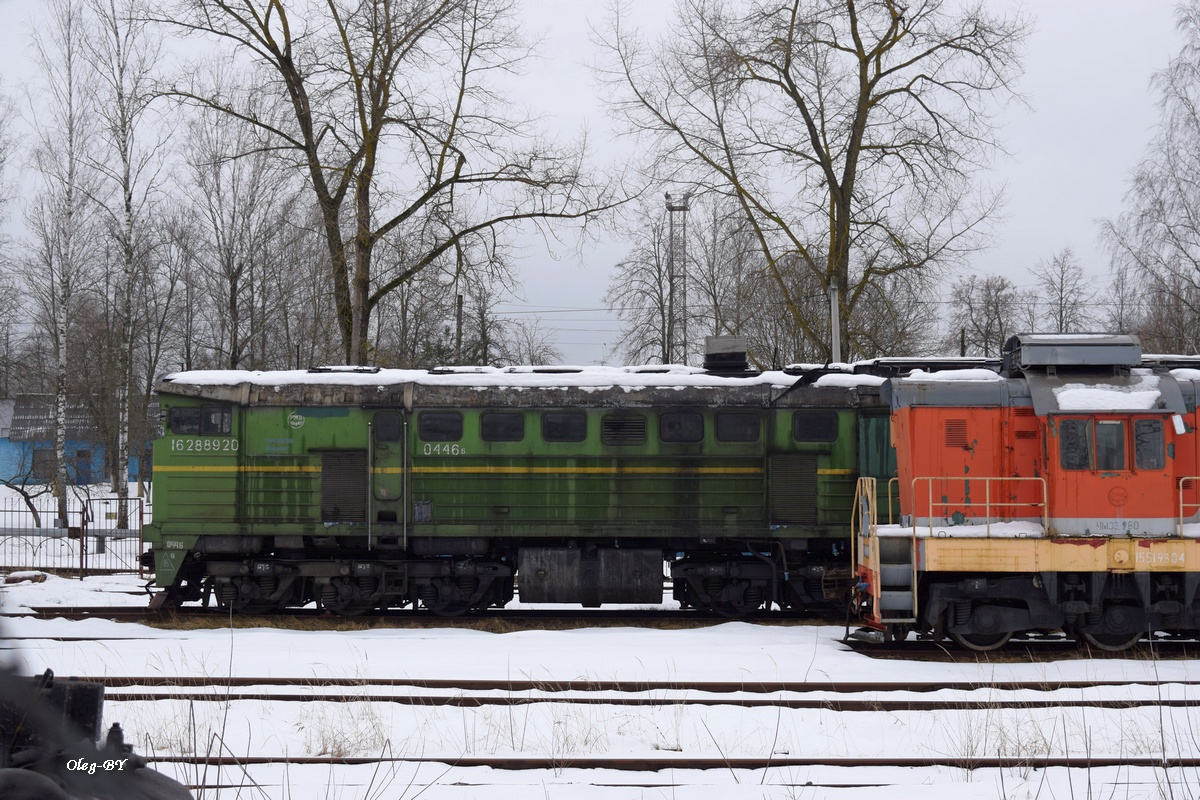
- Railway station

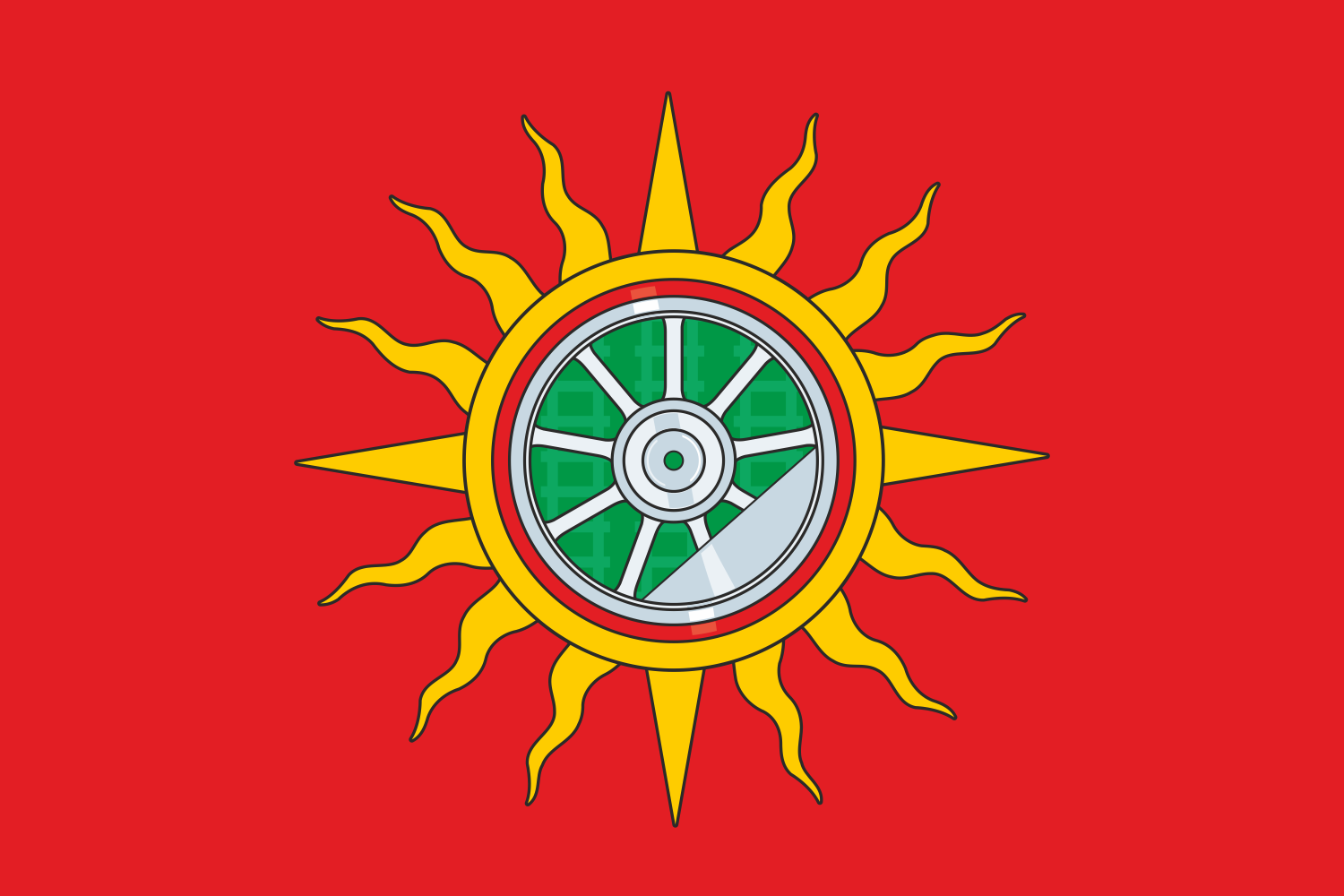
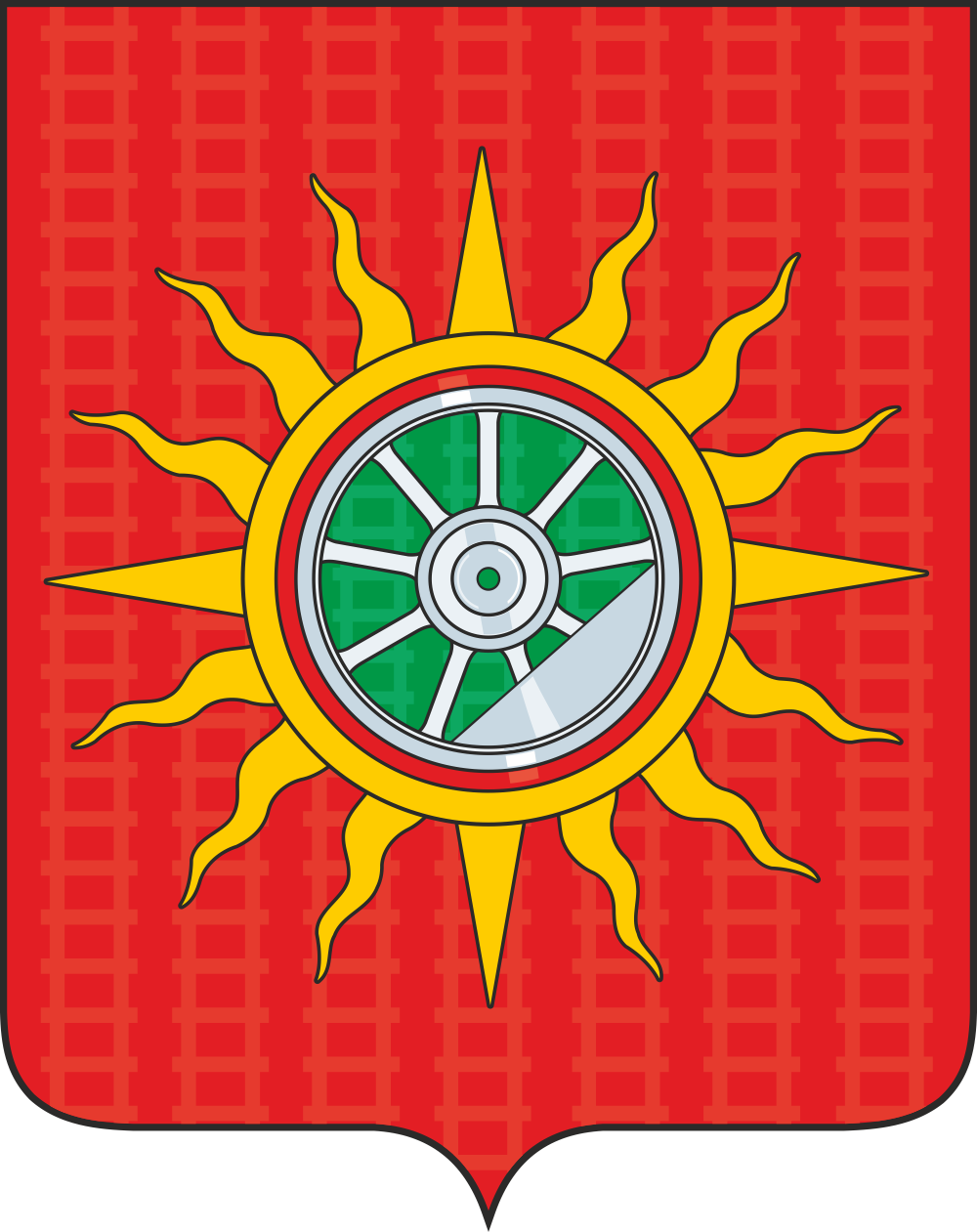
- Flag Coat of arms
- Interactive map of Unecha
- Location of Unecha Unecha (European Russia) Unecha (Russia)
- Coordinates: 52°50′46″N 32°40′36″E
- Country: Russia
- Federal subject: Bryansk Oblast
- Administrative district: Unechsky District
- Urban Administrative OkrugSelsoviet: Unechsky
- Founded: 1887
- Town status since: 1940
- Elevation: 180 m (590 ft)

Population (2010 Census)
  - Total: 26,197
  - Estimate (2021): 24,274 (−7.3%)

Administrative status
  - Capital of: Unechsky District, Unechsky Urban Administrative Okrug

Municipal status
  - Municipal district: Unechsky Municipal District
  - Urban settlement: Unechskoye Urban Settlement
  - Capital of: Unechsky Municipal District, Unechskoye Urban Settlement
- Time zone: UTC+3 (MSK)
- Postal code: 243300
- Dialing code: +7 48351
- OKTMO ID: 15658101001

Unecha (Russian: Уне́ча), a town and the administrative center of Unechsky District in Bryansk Oblast, Russia, stands on the Unecha River (within the Dnieper's basin) 140 kilometers (87 mi) southwest of Bryansk, the administrative center of the oblast. Population: 24,274 (2021 census); 26,197 (2010 census); 29,039 (2002 census); 28,583 (1989 Soviet census).

== History ==
Historically, the territory at various times formed part of Lithuania, Muscovy, the Polish–Lithuanian Commonwealth and Russia.

Town status was granted in 1940.

From 1936 to 1951 Unecha was the home station for the Unecha motive branch of the Belarusian railway. From September 1943 to March 1944 the Directorate of the Belarusian railway was situated in the town.

Prior to World War II, about 12% of inhabitants were Jews. 1,708 Jews were living in Unecha. The town was occupied by the German army in the middle of August 1941. A large number of Jews managed to flee to the east before the Germans’ arrival. Shortly after the German occupation, the Jews were distinguished and forbidden to leave the town. In October 1941, all the Jews were confined to a closed ghetto, where they stayed until its liquidation in mid-March 1942. Due to harsh living conditions and hunger, many Jews died before the liquidation. Hundred of them were executed and group of Roma from another village were murdered alongside the Jews on this day. The Germans also operated a forced labour battalion for Jews and the Dulag 121 transit prisoner-of-war camp in the town.

== Administrative and municipal status ==
Within the framework of administrative divisions, Unecha serves as the administrative center of Unechsky District. As an administrative division, it is, together with six rural localities, incorporated within Unechsky District as Unechsky Urban Administrative Okrug. As a municipal division, Unechsky Urban Administrative Okrug is incorporated within Unechsky Municipal District as Unechskoye Urban Settlement.

== Notable people ==
- Aleksandr Putsko, footballer
