= Unechsky District =

Unechsky District Унечский район (Russian)
- District
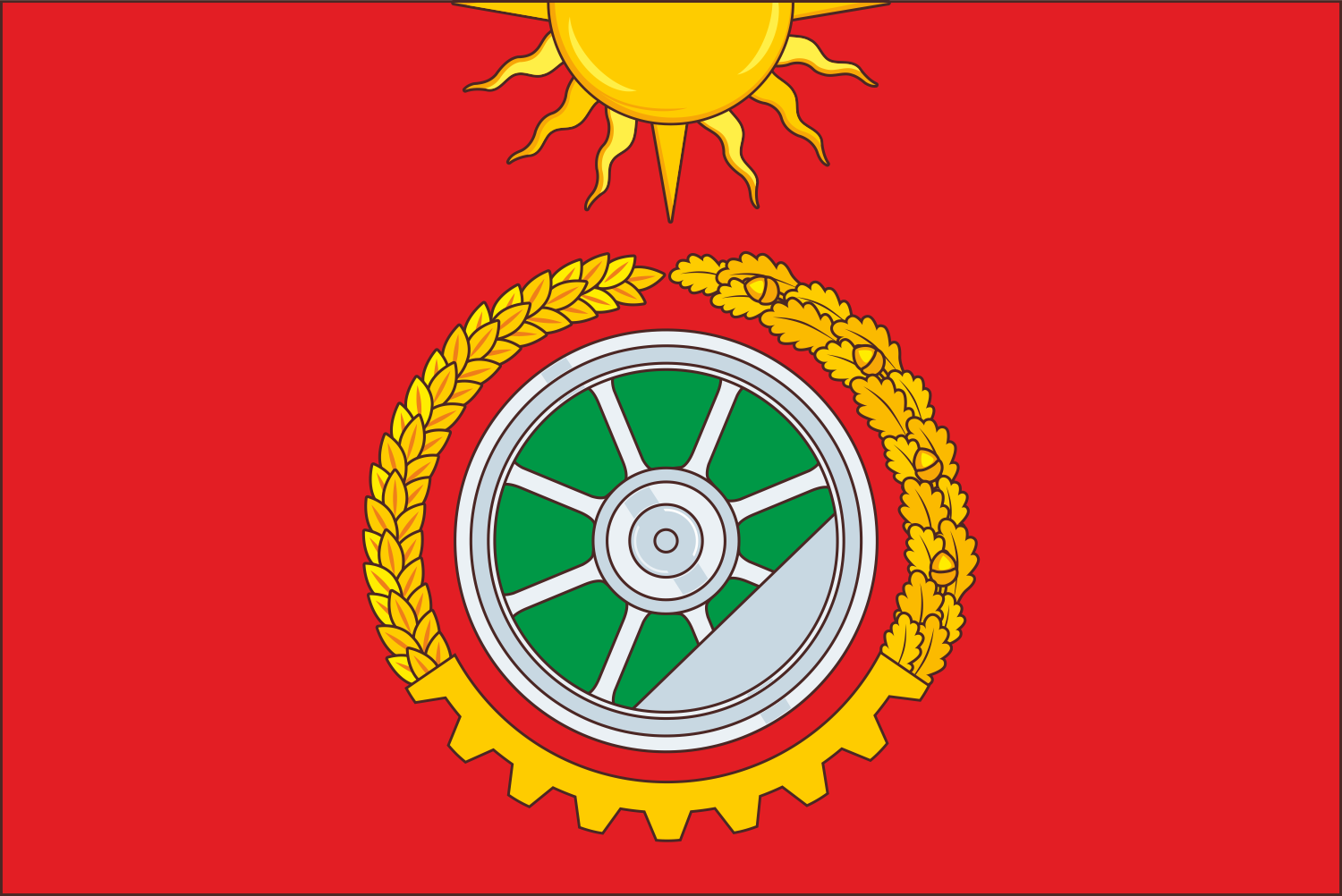
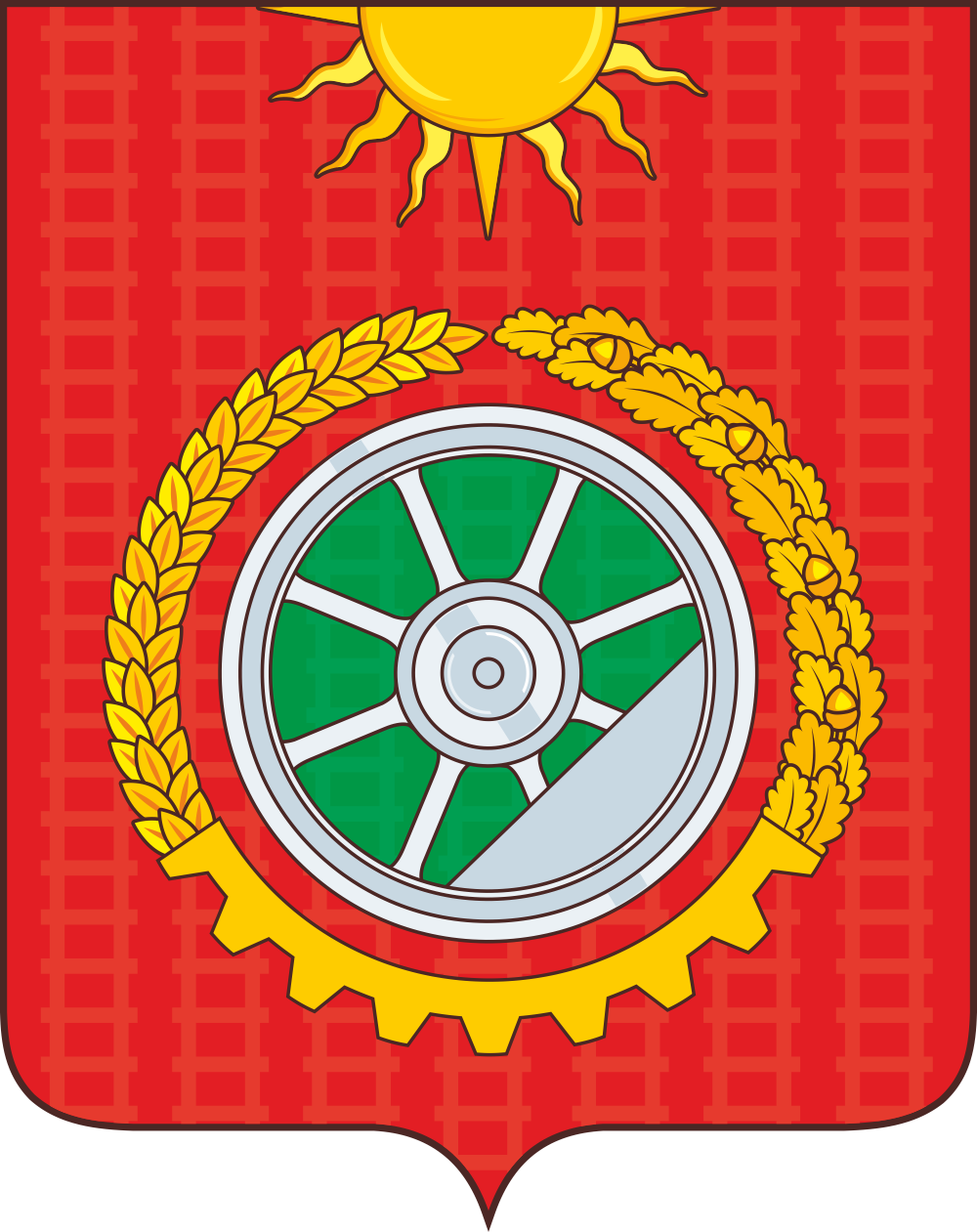
- Flag Coat of arms
- Location of Unechsky District in Bryansk Oblast
- Coordinates: 52°51′N 32°41′E
- Country: Russia
- Federal subject: Bryansk Oblast
- Established: 1929
- Administrative center: Unecha

Area
  - Total: 1,148 km^{2} (443 sq mi)

Population (2010 Census)
  - Total: 40,682
  - Density: 35.44/km^{2} (91.78/sq mi)
  - Urban: 64.4%
  - Rural: 35.6%

Administrative structure
  - Administrative divisions: 1 Urban administrative okrugs, 8 Rural administrative okrugs
  - Inhabited localities: 1 cities/towns, 110 rural localities

Municipal structure
  - Municipally incorporated as: Unechsky Municipal District
  - Municipal divisions: 1 urban settlements, 8 rural settlements
- Time zone: UTC+3 (MSK)
- OKTMO ID: 15658000
- Website: http://www.unradm.ru/

Unechsky District (Russian: Унечский райо́н) is an administrative and municipal district (raion), one of the twenty-seven in Bryansk Oblast, Russia. It is located in the western central part of the oblast. The area of the district is 1,148 square kilometers (443 sq mi). Its administrative center is the town of Unecha. Population: 34,698 (2021 census); 40,682 (2010 census); 46,871 (2002 Census); 49,383 (1989 Soviet census). The population of Unecha accounts for 70.0% of the district's total population.
