= Yurla (rural locality) =

Rural locality in Perm Krai, Russia

Coordinates: 59°19′51″N 54°20′07″E

Yurla (Russian: Юрла, Komi-Permyak: Юрла) is a rural locality (a selo) and the administrative center of Yurlinsky District, Komi-Permyak Okrug, Perm Krai, Russia. Population: 4,094 (2010 census); 4,223 (2002 census); 4,331 (1989 Soviet census).
