= Yurlinsky District =

Yurlinsky District Юрлинский район (Russian)
- District
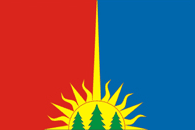
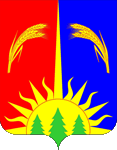
- Flag Coat of arms
- Location of Yurlinsky District in Komi-Permyak Okrug, Perm Krai
- Coordinates: 59.377°N 54.137°E
- Country: Russia
- Federal subject: Perm Krai
- Established: January 7, 1924
- Administrative center: Yurla

Area
  - Total: 3,831 km^{2} (1,479 sq mi)

Population (2010 Census)
  - Total: 9,609
  - Density: 2.508/km^{2} (6.496/sq mi)
  - Urban: 0%
  - Rural: 100%

Administrative structure
  - Inhabited localities: 85 rural localities

Municipal structure
  - Municipally incorporated as: Yurlinsky Municipal District
  - Municipal divisions: 0 urban settlements, 3 rural settlements
- Time zone: UTC+5 (MSK+2)
- OKTMO ID: 57559000

Yurlinsky District (Russian: Ю́рлинский райо́н) is an administrative district (raion) of Komi-Permyak Okrug of Perm Krai, Russia; one of the thirty-three in the krai. As a municipal division, it is incorporated as Yurlinsky Municipal District. It is located in the west of the krai. The area of the district is 3,831 square kilometers (1,479 sq mi). Its administrative center is the rural locality (a selo) of Yurla. Population: 9,609 (2010 census); 12,162 (2002 census); 15,889 (1989 Soviet census). The population of Yurla accounts for 42.6% of the district's total population.

== Geography ==
Over 80% of the district's territory is covered by forests.

== History ==
The district was established on January 7, 1924.

== Demographics ==
Ethnic composition (as of the 2002 Census):

- Russians: 95.8%
- Komi-Permyak people: 3%

== Economy ==
The economy of the district is based on forestry, timber industry, and agriculture.

== Sources ==
- Законодательное собрание Пермской области. Закон №416-67 от 28 февраля 1996 г. «Об административно-территориальном устройстве Пермского края», в ред. Закона №504-ПК от 9 июля 2015 г. «О внесении изменений в Закон Пермской области "Об административно-территориальном устройстве Пермского края"». Вступил в силу с момента опубликования. Опубликован: "Звезда", №38, 12 марта 1996 г. (Legislative Assembly of Perm Oblast. Law #416-67 of February 28, 1996 On the Administrative-Territorial Structure of Perm Krai, as amended by the Law #504-PK of July 9, 2015 On Amending the Law of Perm Oblast "On the Administrative-Territorial Structure of Perm Krai". Effective as of the moment of publication.).
- Законодательное собрание Коми-Пермяцкого автономного округа. Закон №63 от 19 ноября 2004 г. «Об утверждении границ и о наделении статусом муниципальных образований Юрлинского района Пермского края», в ред. Закона №470-ПК от 5 мая 2015 г. «О внесении изменений в отдельные Законы Пермской области, Коми-Пермяцкого автономного округа и Пермского края». Вступил в силу через 10 дней со дня официального опубликования. Опубликован: "Парма", №238–239, 30 ноября 2004 г. (Legislative Assembly of Komi-Permyak Autonomous Okrug. Law #63 of November 19, 2004 On Establishing the Borders and on Granting the Status to the Municipal Formations of Yurlinsky District of Perm Krai, as amended by the Law #470-PK of May 5, 2015 On Amending Various Laws of Perm Oblast, Komi-Permyak Autonomous Okrug, and Perm Krai. Effective as of the day which is 10 days following the day of the official publication.).
