= Bakaly, Bakalinsky District, Bashkortostan =

Place in Bashkortostan, Russia

Bakaly Бакалы
- Selo

Other transcription(s)
  - Bashkir: Баҡалы
- Interactive map of Bakaly
- Location of Bakaly Bakaly (Bashkortostan)
- Coordinates: 55°10′40″N 53°48′01″E
- Country: Russia
- Federal subject: Bashkortostan
- Administrative district: Bakalinsky District
- SelsovietSelsoviet: Bakalinsky Selsoviet
- Elevation: 108 m (354 ft)

Population (2010 Census)
  - Total: 9,568
  - Estimate (1 January 1934): 2,437 (−74.5%)

Administrative status
  - Capital of: Bakalinsky District, Bakalinsky Selsoviet

Municipal status
  - Municipal district: Bakalinsky Municipal District
  - Rural settlement: Bakalinsky Selsoviet Rural Settlement
  - Capital of: Bakalinsky Municipal District, Bakalinsky Selsoviet Rural Settlement
- Time zone: UTC+5 (MSK+2)
- Postal code: 452650
- OKTMO ID: 80607407101

Bakaly (Russian: Бакалы; Bashkir: Баҡалы, Baqalı; Tatar: Бакалы, Baqalı) is a rural locality (a selo) and the administrative center of Bakalinsky District of the Republic of Bashkortostan, Russia. Population: 9,568 (2010 census); 9,514 (2002 census); 8,240 (1989 Soviet census).
