= Bakalinsky District =

Bakalinsky District Бакалинский район (Russian)
- District

Other transcription(s)
  - Bashkir: Баҡалы районы
  - Tatar: Бакалы районы
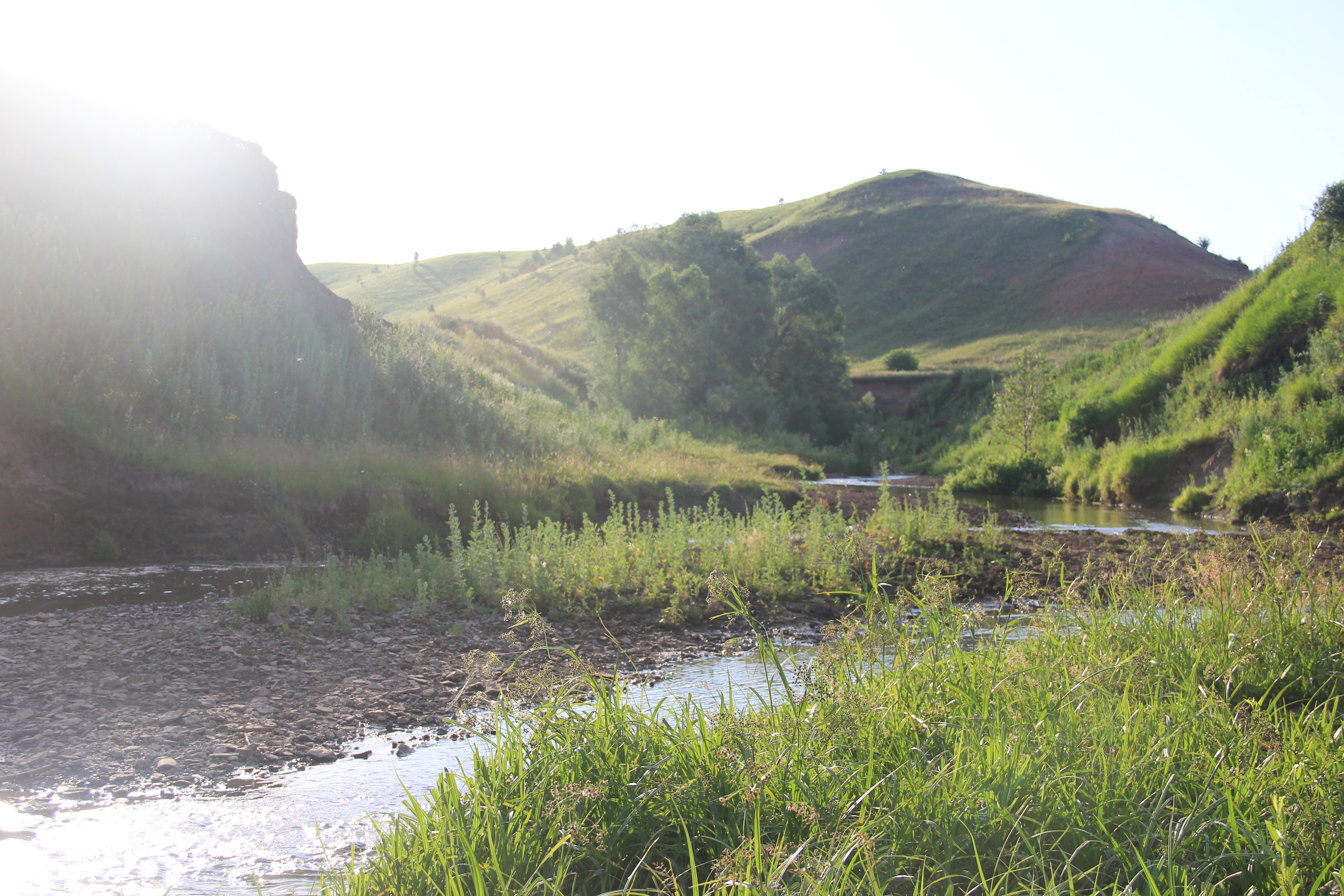
- The Sherashlinka River in Bakalinsky District

- Flag Coat of arms
- Location of Bakalinsky District in the Republic of Bashkortostan
- Coordinates: 55°11′N 53°48′E
- Country: Russia
- Federal subject: Republic of Bashkortostan
- Established: August 20, 1930
- Administrative center: Bakaly

Area
  - Total: 1,951 km^{2} (753 sq mi)

Population (2010 Census)
  - Total: 28,776
  - Density: 14.75/km^{2} (38.20/sq mi)
  - Urban: 0%
  - Rural: 100%

Administrative structure
  - Administrative divisions: 17 Selsoviets
  - Inhabited localities: 96 rural localities

Municipal structure
  - Municipally incorporated as: Bakalinsky Municipal District
  - Municipal divisions: 0 urban settlements, 17 rural settlements
- Time zone: UTC+5 (MSK+2)
- OKTMO ID: 80607000
- Website: http://www.bakaly.ru

Population of Bakalinsky District
- 2010 Census: 28,776
- 2002 Census: 32,327
- 1989 Census: 32,400
- 1979 Census: 39,212

Bakalinsky District (Russian: Бакали́нский райо́н; Bashkir: Баҡалы районы, Baqalı rayonı; Tatar: Бакалы районы, Baqalı rayonı) is an administrative and municipal district (raion), one of the fifty-four in the Republic of Bashkortostan, Russia. It is located in the west of the republic and borders with Ilishevsky District in the northeast, Chekmagushevsky District in the east, Sharansky District in the south, and with the Republic of Tatarstan in the west and northwest. The area of the district is 1,951 square kilometers (753 sq mi). Its administrative center is the rural locality (a selo) of Bakaly. As of the 2010 Census, the total population of the district was 28,776, with the population of Bakaly accounting for 33.3% of that number.

== Geography ==
The district is located around the Bugulminskoye-Belebey Mountains sloping gently to the north in the valley of the Belaya River. The climate is continental with moderate humidity. In the elevated part of the watershed it is characterized by mixed deciduous forests, with oak, birch, and aspen. Forests cover 44% of the area and there are several oil fields, such as Mustafinskoye and Katayevskoye.

== History ==
The district was established on August 20, 1930.

== Administrative and municipal status ==
Within the framework of administrative divisions, Bakalinsky District is one of the fifty-four in the Republic of Bashkortostan. The district is divided into seventeen selsoviets, comprising ninety-six rural localities. As a municipal division, the district is incorporated as Bakalinsky Municipal District. Its seventeen selsoviets are incorporated as seventeen rural settlements within the municipal district. The selo of Bakaly serves as the administrative center of both the administrative and municipal district.
