= Babino =

Babino may refer to the following places:

- Babino, Bulgaria
- Babino, Grand'Anse, Haiti
- Babino, Berane Municipality, Montenegro
- Babino, Demir Hisar, a village in Demir Hisar municipality, North Macedonia
- Babino, Podlaskie Voivodeship, Poland
- Babino, Vladimir Oblast, Russia
- Babino, Vologda Oblast, Russia
- Babino, Voronezh Oblast, Russia
