= Yelan =

Yelan (Russian: Елань) is the name of several places in Russia.

== Republic of Bashkortostan ==
- Yelan, Republic of Bashkortostan, a village in Ishlinsky Selsoviet of Beloretsky District

== Republic of Buryatia ==
- Yelan, Bichursky District, Republic of Buryatia, a selo in Yelansky Selsoviet of Bichursky District
- Yelan, Kabansky District, Republic of Buryatia, a selo in Kabansky Selsoviet of Kabansky District

== Irkutsk Oblast ==
- Yelan, Cheremkhovsky District, Irkutsk Oblast, a village in Cheremkhovsky District
- Yelan, Chunsky District, Irkutsk Oblast, a settlement in Chunsky District

== Kemerovo Oblast ==
- Yelan, Kemerovo Oblast, a settlement in Yelanskaya Rural Territory of Novokuznetsky District

== Rostov Oblast ==
- Yelan, Rostov Oblast, a khutor in Voykovskoye Rural Settlement of Tarasovsky District

== Samara Oblast ==
- Yelan, Samara Oblast, a selo in Khvorostyansky District

== Saratov Oblast ==
- Yelan, Saratov Oblast, a selo in Rtishchevsky District

== Sverdlovsk Oblast ==
- Yelan, Alapayevsky District, Sverdlovsk Oblast, a village in Alapayevsky District
- Yelan, Baykalovsky District, Sverdlovsk Oblast, a selo in Baykalovsky District
- Yelan, Talitsky District, Sverdlovsk Oblast, a selo in Talitsky District

== Tambov Oblast ==
- Yelan, Tambov Oblast, a settlement in Popovsky Selsoviet of Staroyuryevsky District

== Tyumen Oblast ==
- Yelan, Nizhnetavdinsky District, Tyumen Oblast, a selo in Antipinsky Rural Okrug of Nizhnetavdinsky District
- Yelan, Tobolsky District, Tyumen Oblast, a village in Khmelevsky Rural Okrug of Tobolsky District
- Yelan, Tyumensky District, Tyumen Oblast, a village in Perevalovsky Rural Okrug of Tyumensky District
- Yelan, Vagaysky District, Tyumen Oblast, a village in Kularovsky Rural Okrug of Vagaysky District

== Volgograd Oblast ==
- Yelan, Volgograd Oblast, a work settlement in Yelansky District

== Voronezh Oblast ==
- Yelan (river), a tributary of the river Savala (Don basin)
