= Polovtsevo =

Polovtsevo Половцево
- Settlement
- Location within Voronezh Oblast Location within Russia
- Coordinates: 51°06′N 41°42′E
- Country: Russia
- Region: Voronezh Oblast
- District: Novokhopyorsky District
- Time zone: UTC+3:00

Polovtsevo (Russian: По́ловцево) is a rural locality (a settlement) in Novokhopyorsk, Novokhopyorsky District, Voronezh Oblast, Russia. The population was 585 as of 2010. There are 12 streets.

== Geography ==
Polovtsevo is located 8 km northeast of Novokhopyorsk (the district's administrative centre) by road. Zamelnichny is the nearest rural locality.
