= Nekrylovsky =

Nekrylovsky Некрыловский
- Settlement
- Location within Voronezh Oblast Location within Russia
- Coordinates: 51°03′N 41°16′E
- Country: Russia
- Region: Voronezh Oblast
- District: Novokhopyorsky District
- Time zone: UTC+3:00

Nekrylovsky (Russian: Некрыловский) is a rural locality (a settlement) in Kolenovskoye Rural Settlement, Novokhopyorsky District, Voronezh Oblast, Russia. The population was 141 as of 2010.

== Geography ==
Nekrylovsky is located 49 km WSW of Novokhopyorsk (the district's administrative centre) by road. Beryozovka is the nearest rural locality.
