= Kamenka-Sadovka =

Kamenka-Sadovka Каменка-Садовка
- Selo
- Location within Voronezh Oblast Location within Russia
- Coordinates: 51°01′N 41°38′E
- Country: Russia
- Region: Voronezh Oblast
- District: Novokhopyorsky District
- Time zone: UTC+3:00

Kamenka-Sadovka (Russian: Ка́менка-Садовка) is a rural locality (a selo) in Novokhopyorsk, Novokhopyorsky District, Voronezh Oblast, Russia. The population was 607 as of 2010. There are 11 streets.

== Geography ==
Kamenka-Sadovka is located 10 km south of Novokhopyorsk (the district's administrative centre) by road. Novokhopyorsk is the nearest rural locality.
