= Lipyagi, Voronezh Oblast =

Lipyagi Липяги
- Selo
- Location within Voronezh Oblast Location within Russia
- Coordinates: 51°34′N 41°48′E
- Country: Russia
- Region: Voronezh Oblast
- District: Ternovsky District
- Time zone: UTC+3:00

Lipyagi (Russian: Липяги) is a rural locality (a selo) in Narodnenskoye Rural Settlement, Ternovsky District, Voronezh Oblast, Russia. The population was 721 as of 2010. There are 5 streets.

== Geography ==
Lipyagi is located 24 km southeast of Ternovka (the district's administrative centre) by road. Narodnoye is the nearest rural locality.
