= Shevlyaginsky =

Shevlyaginsky Шевлягинский
- Settlement
- Location within Voronezh Oblast Location within Russia
- Coordinates: 51°13′N 41°18′E
- Country: Russia
- Region: Voronezh Oblast
- District: Novokhopyorsky District
- Time zone: UTC+3:00

Shevlyaginsky (Russian: Шевля́гинский) is a rural locality (a settlement) in Novopokrovskoye Rural Settlement, Novokhopyorsky District, Voronezh Oblast, Russia. The population was 50 as of 2010.

== Geography ==
Shevlyaginsky is located 37 km northwest of Novokhopyorsk (the district's administrative centre) by road. Novopokrovsky is the nearest rural locality.
