= Nikitskaya =

Nikitskaya Никитская
- Village
- Location within Voronezh Oblast Location within Russia
- Coordinates: 51°41′N 41°47′E
- Country: Russia
- Region: Voronezh Oblast
- District: Ternovsky District
- Time zone: UTC+3:00

Nikitskaya (Russian: Никитская) is a rural locality (a village) in Aleshkovskoye Rural Settlement, Ternovsky District, Voronezh Oblast, Russia. The population was 384 as of 2010. There are 7 streets.

== Geography ==
Nikitskaya is located 16 km east of Ternovka (the district's administrative centre) by road. Aleshki is the nearest rural locality.
