= Yarki =

Yarki Ярки
- Selo
- Location within Voronezh Oblast Location within Russia
- Coordinates: 51°20′N 41°08′E
- Country: Russia
- Region: Voronezh Oblast
- District: Novokhopyorsky District
- Time zone: UTC+3:00

Yarki (Russian: Я́рки) is a rural locality (a selo) and the administrative center of Yarkovskoye Rural Settlement, Novokhopyorsky District, Voronezh Oblast, Russia. The population was 1,058 as of 2010. There are 12 streets.

== Geography ==
Yarki is located 53 km northwest of Novokhopyorsk (the district's administrative centre) by road. Podgornoye is the nearest rural locality.
