= Dolginka =

Dolginka Долгинка
- Settlement
- Location within Voronezh Oblast Location within Russia
- Coordinates: 51°02′N 41°02′E
- Country: Russia
- Region: Voronezh Oblast
- District: Novokhopyorsky District
- Time zone: UTC+3:00

Dolginka (Russian: Долги́нка) is a rural locality (a settlement) in Ternovskoye Rural Settlement, Novokhopyorsky District, Voronezh Oblast, Russia. The population was 90 as of 2010. There are 4 streets.

== Geography ==
Dolginka is located 57 km southwest of Novokhopyorsk (the district's administrative centre) by road. Tambovka is the nearest rural locality.
