= Alfyorovka =

Alfyorovka Алфёровка
- Selo
- Location within Voronezh Oblast Location within Russia
- Coordinates: 51°11′N 41°40′E
- Country: Russia
- Region: Voronezh Oblast
- District: Novokhopyorsky District
- Time zone: UTC+3:00

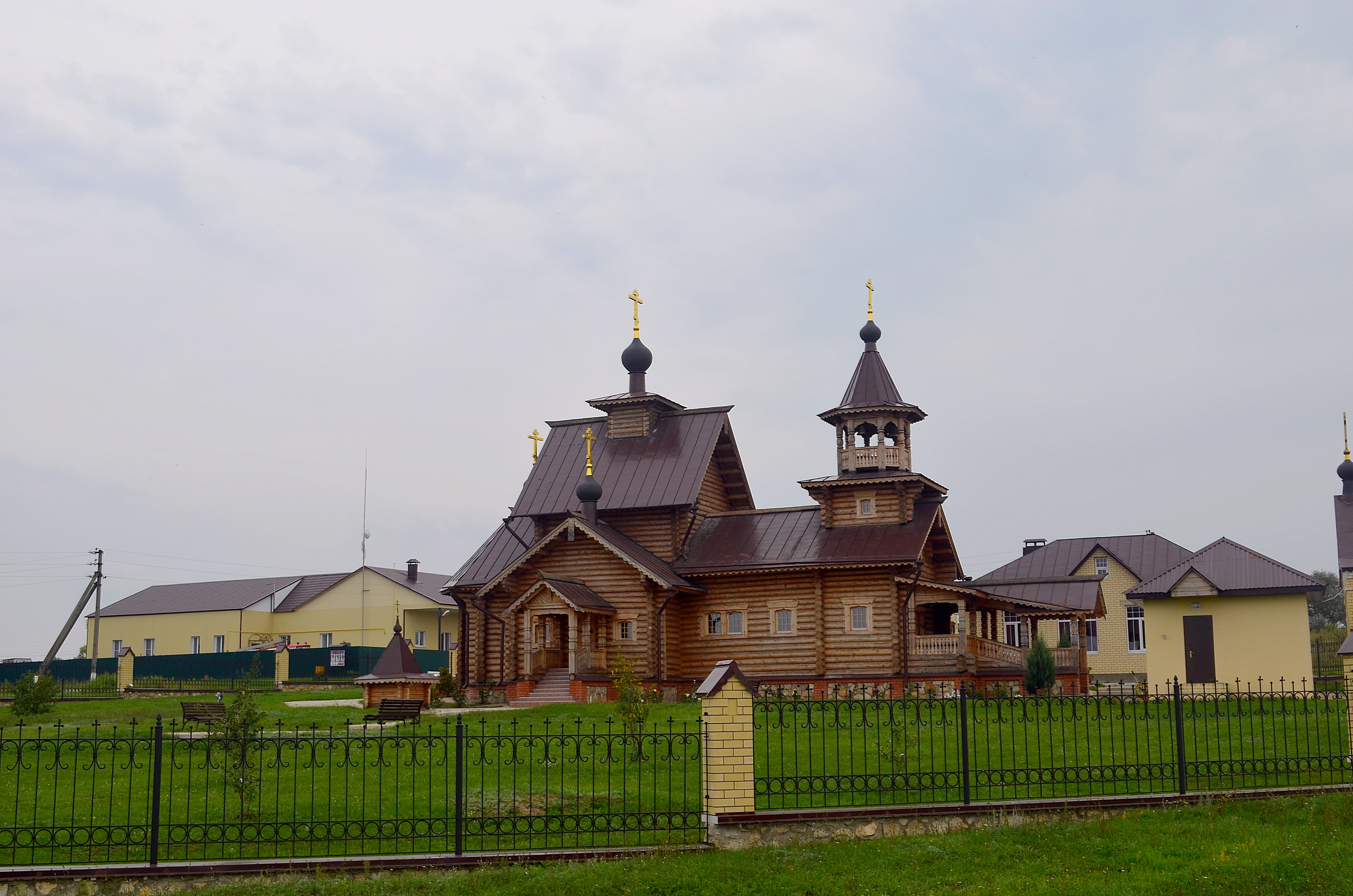
Church of Nikolay Mirlikiysky: Alfyorovka, Novokhopersky District, Voronezh Region

Alfyorovka (Russian: Алфёровка) is a rural locality (a selo) in Novokhopyorsk, Novokhopyorsky District, Voronezh Oblast, Russia. The population was 713 as of 2010. There are 6 streets.

== Geography ==
Alfyorovka is located 21 km north of Novokhopyorsk (the district's administrative centre) by road. Zamelnichny is the nearest rural locality.
