= Dolinovsky =

Dolinovsky Долиновский
- Settlement
- Location within Voronezh Oblast Location within Russia
- Coordinates: 50°59′N 41°06′E
- Country: Russia
- Region: Voronezh Oblast
- District: Novokhopyorsky District
- Time zone: UTC+3:00

Dolinovsky (Russian: Доли́новский) is a rural locality (a settlement) in Kolenovskoye Rural Settlement, Novokhopyorsky District, Voronezh Oblast, Russia. The population was 385 as of 2010. There are 7 streets.

== Geography ==
Dolinovsky is located 56 km southwest of Novokhopyorsk (the district's administrative centre) by road. Sokolovsky is the nearest rural locality.
