= Borozdinovsky =

Borozdinovsky Бороздиновский
- Settlement
- Location within Voronezh Oblast Location within Russia
- Coordinates: 51°12′N 41°20′E
- Country: Russia
- Region: Voronezh Oblast
- District: Novokhopyorsky District
- Time zone: UTC+3:00

Borozdinovsky (Russian: Борозди́новский) is a rural locality (a settlement) in Novopokrovskoye Rural Settlement, Novokhopyorsky District, Voronezh Oblast, Russia. The population was 675 as of 2010. There are 13 streets.

== Geography ==
Borozdinovsky is located 38 km northwest of Novokhopyorsk (the district's administrative centre) by road. Shevlyaginsky is the nearest rural locality.
