= Nekrylovo =

Nekrylovo Некрылово
- Settlement
- Location within Voronezh Oblast Location within Russia
- Coordinates: 51°08′N 41°28′E
- Country: Russia
- Region: Voronezh Oblast
- District: Novokhopyorsky District
- Time zone: UTC+3:00

Nekrylovo (Russian: Некрылово) is a rural locality (a settlement) in Krasnyanskoye Rural Settlement, Novokhopyorsky District, Voronezh Oblast, Russia. The population was 783 as of 2010. There are 11 streets.

== Geography ==
Nekrylovo is located 17 km northwest of Novokhopyorsk (the district's administrative centre) by road. Krasnoye is the nearest rural locality.
