= Dimitrovsky =

Dimitrovsky Димитровский
- Settlement
- Location within Voronezh Oblast Location within Russia
- Coordinates: 51°08′N 41°08′E
- Country: Russia
- Region: Voronezh Oblast
- District: Novokhopyorsky District
- Time zone: UTC+3:00

Dimitrovsky (Russian: Дими́тровский) is a rural locality (a settlement) in Kolenovskoye Rural Settlement, Novokhopyorsky District, Voronezh Oblast, Russia. The population was 82 as of 2010.

== Geography ==
Dimitrovsky is located 43 km west of Novokhopyorsk (the district's administrative centre) by road. Yelan-Kolenovsky is the nearest rural locality.
