= Orlovka, Ternovsky District, Voronezh Oblast =

Orlovka Орловка
- Village
- Location within Voronezh Oblast Location within Russia
- Coordinates: 51°43′N 41°30′E
- Country: Russia
- Region: Voronezh Oblast
- District: Ternovsky District
- Time zone: UTC+3:00

Orlovka (Russian: Орловка) is a rural locality (a village) in Yesipovskoye Rural Settlement, Ternovsky District, Voronezh Oblast, Russia. The population was 72 as of 2010.

== Geography ==
Orlovka is located 11 km northwest of Ternovka (the district's administrative centre) by road. Rusanovo is the nearest rural locality.
