= Lunacharovka =

Lunacharovka Луначаровка
- Settlement
- Location within Voronezh Oblast Location within Russia
- Coordinates: 51°35′N 41°04′E
- Country: Russia
- Region: Voronezh Oblast
- District: Ternovsky District
- Time zone: UTC+3:00

Lunacharovka (Russian: Луначаровка) is a rural locality (a settlement) in Kiselinskoye Rural Settlement, Ternovsky District, Voronezh Oblast, Russia. The population was 81 as of 2010.

== Geography ==
Lunacharovka is located 50 km west of Ternovka (the district's administrative centre) by road. Dubrovka is the nearest rural locality.
