= Studyony, Voronezh Oblast =

Studyony Студёный
- Settlement
- Location within Voronezh Oblast Location within Russia
- Coordinates: 51°08′N 41°08′E
- Country: Russia
- Region: Voronezh Oblast
- District: Novokhopyorsky District
- Time zone: UTC+3:00

Studyony (Russian: Студёный) is a rural locality (a settlement) in Kolenovskoye Rural Settlement, Novokhopyorsky District, Voronezh Oblast, Russia. The population was 57 as of 2010.

== Geography ==
Studyony is located 41 km west of Novokhopyorsk (the district's administrative centre) by road. Dimitrovsky is the nearest rural locality.
