= Karachanovsky =

Karachanovsky Карачановский
- Settlement
- Location within Voronezh Oblast Location within Russia
- Coordinates: 50°57′N 41°11′E
- Country: Russia
- Region: Voronezh Oblast
- District: Novokhopyorsky District
- Time zone: UTC+3:00

Karachanovsky (Russian: Карача́новский) is a rural locality (a settlement) in Kolenovskoye Rural Settlement, Novokhopyorsky District, Voronezh Oblast, Russia. The population was 352 as of 2010. There are 2 streets.

== Geography ==
Karachanovsky is located 46 km southwest of Novokhopyorsk (the district's administrative centre) by road. Polezhayevsky is the nearest rural locality.
