= Novopokrovsky, Voronezh Oblast =

Novopokrovsky Новопокровский
- Settlement
- Location within Voronezh Oblast Location within Russia
- Coordinates: 51°14′N 41°18′E
- Country: Russia
- Region: Voronezh Oblast
- District: Novokhopyorsky District
- Time zone: UTC+3:00

Novopokrovsky (Russian: Новопокро́вский) is a rural locality (a settlement) and the administrative center of Novopokrovskoye Rural Settlement, Novokhopyorsky District, Voronezh Oblast, Russia. The population was 438 as of 2010. There are 6 streets.

== Geography ==
Novopokrovsky is located 41 km northwest of Novokhopyorsk (the district's administrative centre) by road. Shevlyaginsky is the nearest rural locality.
