= Korshunovka, Voronezh Oblast =

Korshunovka Коршуновка
- Village
- Location within Voronezh Oblast Location within Russia
- Coordinates: 51°34′N 41°53′E
- Country: Russia
- Region: Voronezh Oblast
- District: Ternovsky District
- Time zone: UTC+3:00

Korshunovka (Russian: Коршуновка) is a rural locality (a village) in Narodnenskoye Rural Settlement, Ternovsky District, Voronezh Oblast, Russia. The population was 89 as of 2010. There are 2 streets.

== Geography ==
Korshunovka is located 28 km southeast of Ternovka (the district's administrative centre) by road. Alexandrovka is the nearest rural locality.
