= Pionersky, Voronezh Oblast =

Pionersky Пионерский
- Settlement
- Location within Voronezh Oblast Location within Russia
- Coordinates: 50°51′N 41°16′E
- Country: Russia
- Region: Voronezh Oblast
- District: Novokhopyorsky District
- Time zone: UTC+3:00

Pionersky (Russian: Пионе́рский) is a rural locality (a settlement) and the administrative center of Mikhaylovskoye Rural Settlement, Novokhopyorsky District, Voronezh Oblast, Russia. The population was 135 as of 2010.

== Geography ==
Pionersky is located 44 km southwest of Novokhopyorsk (the district's administrative centre) by road. Polezhayevsky is the nearest rural locality.
