= Ternovsky =

Ternovsky (masculine), Ternovskaya (feminine), or Ternovskoye may refer to:

- Ternovsky District, a district of Voronezh Oblast, Russia
- Ternovsky (rural locality) (Ternovskaya, Ternovskoye), several rural localities in Russia
