= Kostino-Otdelets =

Kostino-Otdelets Костино-Отделец
- Selo
- Location within Voronezh Oblast Location within Russia
- Coordinates: 51°31′N 41°27′E
- Country: Russia
- Region: Voronezh Oblast
- District: Ternovsky District
- Time zone: UTC+3:00

Kostino-Otdelets (Russian: Костино-Отделец) is a rural locality (a selo) and the administrative center of Kostino-Otdelskoye Rural Settlement, Ternovsky District, Voronezh Oblast, Russia. The population was 1,372 as of 2010. There are 16 streets.

== Geography ==
Kostino-Otdelets is located 24 km southwest of Ternovka (the district's administrative centre) by road. Zarechye is the nearest rural locality.
