= Ternovka (tributary of Karachan) =

River in Voronezh Oblast, Russia

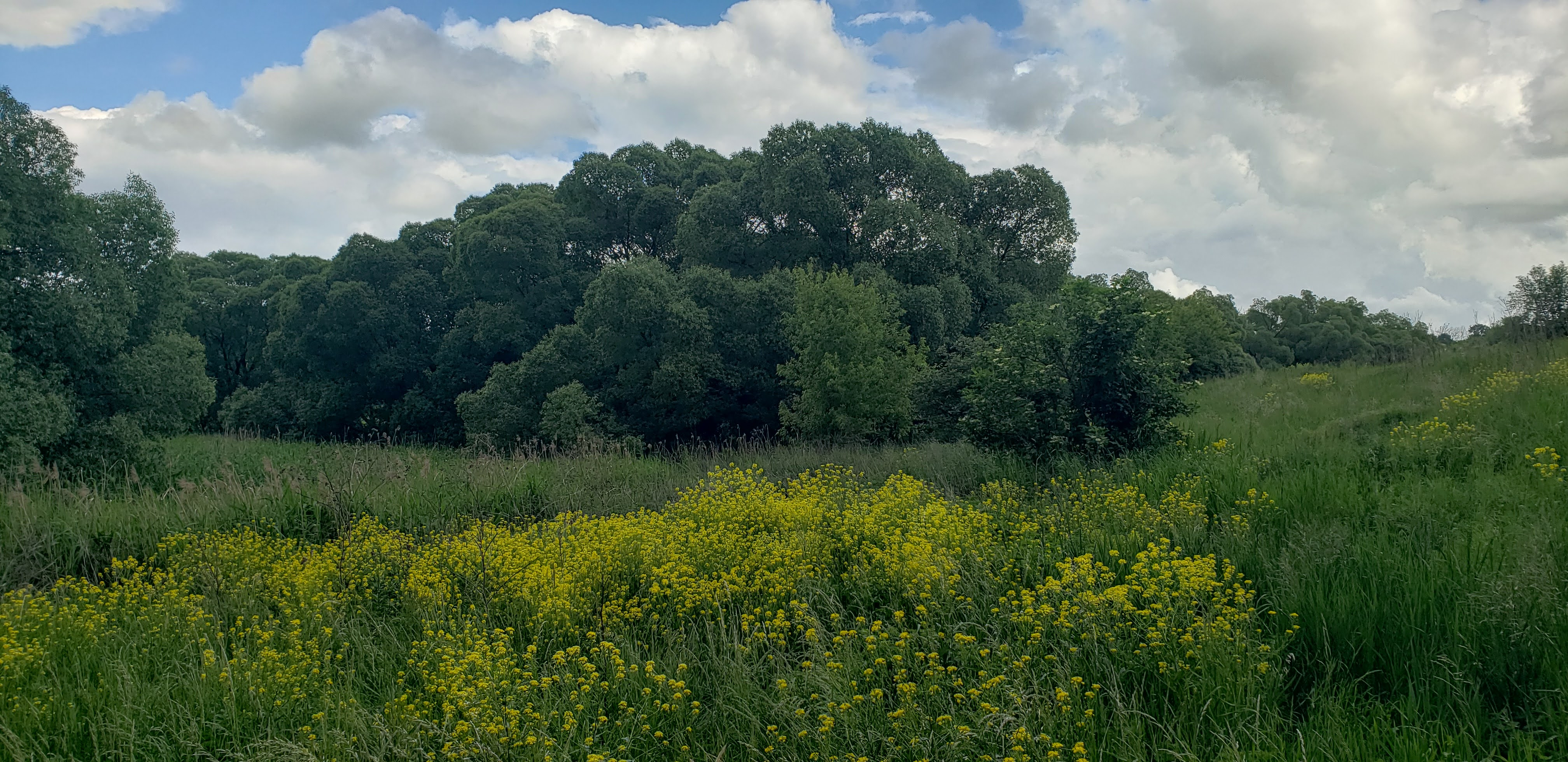

- Location within Russia
- Native name: Терновка (Дубовицкое) (Russian)

Location
- Country: Russia
- Federal subject: Voronezh Oblast

Physical characteristics
- Source: dry creek
  - location: 51°41′14″N 41°38′15″E
  - elevation: 155 m (509 ft)
- Mouth: Karachan
  - location: 51°36′24″N 41°45′59″E
- Length: 24 km (15 mi)
- Basin size: 154 km^{2} (59 sq mi)

Basin features
- Progression: Karachan - Khoper - Don→ Sea of Azov

Ternovka is a small river in Russia, flows through the Voronezh region.

The river takes its sources from dammed creek beam which forms Dubovitsky Prud (Dubovitsky Pond) and Dubovitsky Prud Vtoroy (2nd Dubovitsky Pond) located in balka Dolinnaya Vershina (Dubovitskoe Urochishche) near the village Dubovitskoe (abandoned and disappeared). Near village Ternovka dammed beam forms Novy Prud, Talyancev Prud ( Pyatnadsaty Prud or 15th Pond), Sadovsky Prud (Sadovsky Pond).

The mouth of the river is located on the right bank of the Karachan (Mokryy Karachan) river 58 km from the mouth, south of the village of Alyoshki. The length of the river is 24 km, the catchment area is 154 km², and the river dries up in the upper reaches.

The height of the source is 155 m above sea level.

== Water registry data ==
According to the State Water Register of Russia, it belongs to the Don Basin District, the water management section of the river is Khoper from the confluence of the Vorona River to the mouth, without the rivers Vorona, Savala and Buzuluk, the river sub-basin of the Khoper River. River basin of the river - Don (Russian part of the basin).

Object code in the state water register - 05010200512107000007001.

== See also ==
- List of rivers of Russia
