= Lepyokhinka =

Lepyokhinka Лепёхинка
- Settlement
- Location within Voronezh Oblast Location within Russia
- Coordinates: 50°59′N 41°01′E
- Country: Russia
- Region: Voronezh Oblast
- District: Novokhopyorsky District
- Time zone: UTC+3:00

Lepyokhinka (Russian: Лепёхинка) is a rural locality (a settlement) in Ternovskoye Rural Settlement, Novokhopyorsky District, Voronezh Oblast, Russia. The population was 74 as of 2010. There are 3 streets.

== Geography ==
Lepyokhinka is located 58 km southwest of Novokhopyorsk (the district's administrative centre) by road. Dolinovsky is the nearest rural locality.
