= Semigorovka =

Village in Voronezh Oblast, Russia

Semigorovka Семигоровка
- Village
- Location within Voronezh Oblast Location within Russia
- Coordinates: 51°42′N 41°09′E
- Country: Russia
- Region: Voronezh Oblast
- District: Ternovsky District
- Time zone: UTC+3:00

Semigorovka (Russian: Семигоровка) is a rural locality (a village) in Tambovskoye Rural Settlement, Ternovsky District, Voronezh Oblast, Russia. The population was 57 as of 2010.

== Geography ==
Semigorovka is located on the right bank of the Semigorovka River, 43 km west of Ternovka (the district's administrative centre) by road. Tambovka is the nearest rural locality.
