= Burlyayevka =

Burlyayevka Бурляевка
- Selo
- Location within Voronezh Oblast Location within Russia
- Coordinates: 50°59′N 41°19′E
- Country: Russia
- Region: Voronezh Oblast
- District: Novokhopyorsky District
- Time zone: UTC+3:00

Burlyayevka (Russian: Бурля́евка) is a rural locality (a selo) in Pykhovksoye Rural Settlement, Novokhopyorsky District, Voronezh Oblast, Russia. The population was 351 as of 2010. There are 5 streets.

== Geography ==
Burlyayevka is located 28 km southwest of Novokhopyorsk (the district's administrative centre) by road. Vladimirovka is the nearest rural locality.
