= Kiselnoye =

Kiselnoye Кисельное
- Selo
- Location within Voronezh Oblast Location within Russia
- Coordinates: 51°35′N 41°08′E
- Country: Russia
- Region: Voronezh Oblast
- District: Ternovsky District
- Time zone: UTC+3:00

Kiselnoye (Russian: Кисельное) is a rural locality (a selo) in Kiselinskoye Rural Settlement, Ternovsky District, Voronezh Oblast, Russia. The population was 327 as of 2010. There are 2 streets.

== Geography ==
Kiselnoye is located 50 km southwest of Ternovka (the district's administrative centre) by road. Dubrovka is the nearest rural locality.
