= Polyana, Ternovsky District, Voronezh Oblast =

Polyana Поляна
- Selo
- Location within Voronezh Oblast Location within Russia
- Coordinates: 51°44′N 41°27′E
- Country: Russia
- Region: Voronezh Oblast
- District: Ternovsky District
- Time zone: UTC+3:00

Polyana (Russian: Поляна) is a rural locality (a selo) in Rusanovskoye Rural Settlement, Ternovsky District, Voronezh Oblast, Russia. The population was 458 as of 2010. There are 13 streets.

== Geography ==
Polyana is located 15 km northwest of Ternovka (the district's administrative centre) by road. Rusanovo is the nearest rural locality.
