= Beryozovka, Novokhopyorsky District, Voronezh Oblast =

Beryozovka Берёзовка
- Settlement
- Location within Voronezh Oblast Location within Russia
- Coordinates: 51°03′N 41°14′E
- Country: Russia
- Region: Voronezh Oblast
- District: Novokhopyorsky District
- Time zone: UTC+3:00

Beryozovka (Russian: Берёзовка) is a rural locality (a settlement) in Kolenovskoye Rural Settlement, Novokhopyorsky District, Voronezh Oblast, Russia. The population was 352 as of 2010. There are 6 streets.

== Geography ==
Beryozovka is located 49 km west of Novokhopyorsk (the district's administrative centre) by road. Nekrylovsky is the nearest rural locality.
