= Pykhovka =

Pykhovka Пыховка
- Selo
- Location within Voronezh Oblast Location within Russia
- Coordinates: 51°01′N 41°30′E
- Country: Russia
- Region: Voronezh Oblast
- District: Novokhopyorsky District
- Time zone: UTC+3:00

Pykhovka (Russian: Пыхо́вка) is a rural locality (a selo) and the administrative center of Pykhovksoye Rural Settlement, Novokhopyorsky District, Voronezh Oblast, Russia. The population was 903 as of 2010. There are 11 streets.

== Geography ==
Pykhovka is located 13 km southwest of Novokhopyorsk (the district's administrative centre) by road. Novokhopyorsky is the nearest rural locality.
