= Rusanovo, Novokhopyorsky District, Voronezh Oblast =

Rusanovo Русаново
- Selo
- Location within Voronezh Oblast Location within Russia
- Coordinates: 51°06′N 41°28′E
- Country: Russia
- Region: Voronezh Oblast
- District: Novokhopyorsky District
- Time zone: UTC+3:00

Rusanovo (Russian: Руса́ново) is a rural locality (a selo) in Novokhopyorsk, Novokhopyorsky District, Voronezh Oblast, Russia. The population was 444 as of 2010. There are 2 streets.

== Geography ==
Rusanovo is located 14 km west of Novokhopyorsk (the district's administrative centre) by road. Kocherga is the nearest rural locality.
