= Zherdevka, Tambov Oblast =

Town in Tambov Oblast, Russia

Zherdevka Жердевка
- Town
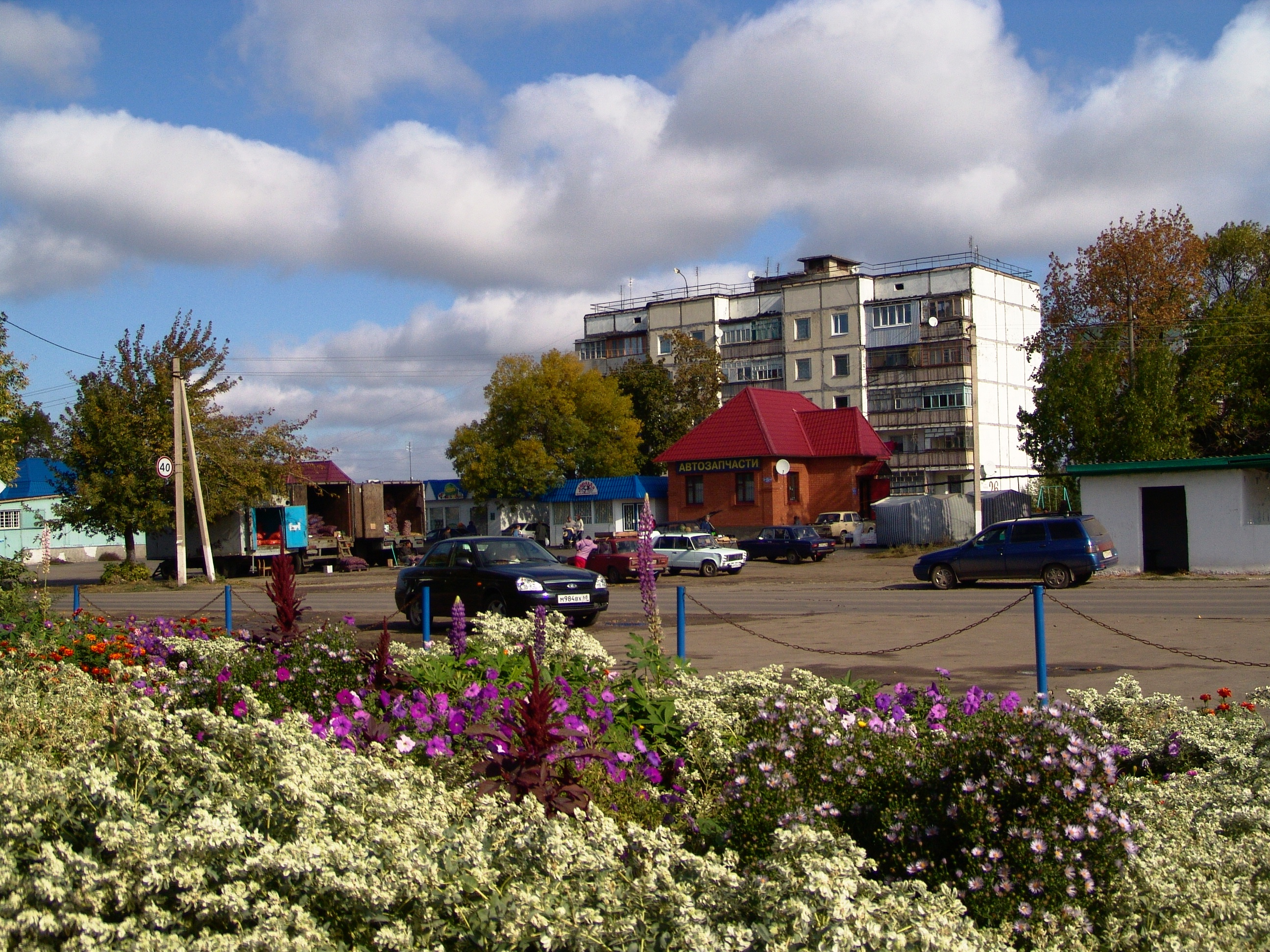
- In Zherdevka

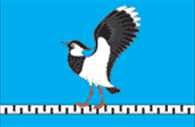
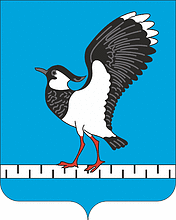
- Flag Coat of arms
- Interactive map of Zherdevka
- Location of Zherdevka Zherdevka (Tambov Oblast)
- Coordinates: 51°51′N 41°27′E
- Country: Russia
- Federal subject: Tambov Oblast
- Administrative district: Zherdevsky District
- Town of district significanceSelsoviet: Zherdevka
- Founded: 1954
- Elevation: 110 m (360 ft)

Population (2010 Census)
  - Total: 15,209
  - Estimate (2025): 13,383 (−12%)

Administrative status
  - Capital of: Zherdevsky District, town of district significance of Zherdevka

Municipal status
  - Municipal district: Zherdevsky Municipal District
  - Urban settlement: Zherdevka Urban Settlement
  - Capital of: Zherdevsky Municipal District, Zherdevka Urban Settlement
- Time zone: UTC+3 (MSK)
- Postal codes: 393670–393672, 393699
- OKTMO ID: 68604101001

Zherdevka (Russian: Же́рдевка) is a town and the administrative center of Zherdevsky District in Tambov Oblast, Russia, located on the Savala River (Khopyor's tributary), 128 kilometers (80 mi) south of Tambov, the administrative center of the oblast. Population: 15,209 (2010 census); 16,557 (2002 census); 19,218 (1989 Soviet census).

== History ==
It was founded in 1954 after the merger of Zherdevka railway station (opened in 1869), a settlement near a sugar factory (built in 1937), and a settlement of Chibizovka. The name of the town derives from a nearby village of Zherdevka, located 8 kilometers (5.0 mi) away from it.

== Administrative and municipal status ==
Within the framework of administrative divisions, Zherdevka serves as the administrative center of Zherdevsky District. As an administrative division, it is incorporated within Zherdevsky District as the town of district significance of Zherdevka. As a municipal division, the town of district significance of Zherdevka is incorporated within Zherdevsky Municipal District as Zherdevka Urban Settlement.

== Military ==
The town was home to Zherdevka air base.
