= Sukmanovka =

Sukmanovka (Russian: Сукмановка) is the name of several rural localities in Russia:

- Sukmanovka, Kursk Oblast, a village in Uspensky Selsoviet of Kastorensky District of Kursk Oblast
- Sukmanovka, Tambov Oblast, a selo in Sukmanovsky Selsoviet of Zherdevsky District of Tambov Oblast
