= Dolina, Voronezh Oblast =

Dolina Долина
- Village
- Location within Voronezh Oblast Location within Russia
- Coordinates: 51°37′N 41°33′E
- Country: Russia
- Region: Voronezh Oblast
- District: Ternovsky District
- Time zone: UTC+3:00

Dolina (Russian: Долина) is a rural locality (a village) in Ternovskoye Rural Settlement, Ternovsky District, Voronezh Oblast, Russia. The population was 126 as of 2010. There are 5 streets.

== Geography ==
Dolina is located 9 km south of Ternovka (the district's administrative centre) by road. Ternovka is the nearest rural locality.
