= Novokirsanovka =

Novokirsanovka Новокирсановка
- Selo
- Location within Voronezh Oblast Location within Russia
- Coordinates: 51°33′N 41°37′E
- Country: Russia
- Region: Voronezh Oblast
- District: Ternovsky District
- Time zone: UTC+3:00

Novokirsanovka (Russian: Новокирсановка) is a rural locality (a village) and the administrative center of Rusanovskoye Rural Settlement, Ternovsky District, Voronezh Oblast, Russia. The population was 408 as of 2010. There are 8 streets.

== Geography ==
Novokirsanovka is located 17 km south of Ternovka (the district's administrative centre) by road. Rzhavets is the nearest rural locality.
