= Rusanovo, Ternovsky District, Voronezh Oblast =

Rusanovo Русаново
- Selo
- Location within Voronezh Oblast Location within Russia
- Coordinates: 51°42′N 41°28′E
- Country: Russia
- Region: Voronezh Oblast
- District: Ternovsky District
- Time zone: UTC+3:00

Rusanovo (Russian: Русаново) is a rural locality (a village) and the administrative center of Rusanovskoye Rural Settlement, Ternovsky District, Voronezh Oblast, Russia. The population was 1,415 as of 2010. There are 18 streets.

== Geography ==
Rusanovo is located 13 km northwest of Ternovka (the district's administrative centre) by road. Polyana is the nearest rural locality.
