= Rzhavets, Voronezh Oblast =

Rzhavets Ржавец
- Selo
- Location within Voronezh Oblast Location within Russia
- Coordinates: 51°31′N 41°37′E
- Country: Russia
- Region: Voronezh Oblast
- District: Ternovsky District
- Time zone: UTC+3:00

Rzhavets (Russian: Ржавец) is a rural locality (a village) in Novokirsanovskoye Rural Settlement, Ternovsky District, Voronezh Oblast, Russia. The population was 408 as of 2010. There are 4 streets.

== Geography ==
Rzhavets is located 22 km south of Ternovka (the district's administrative centre) by road. Novokirsanovka is the nearest rural locality.
