= Bratki =

Bratki Братки
- Selo
- Location within Voronezh Oblast Location within Russia
- Coordinates: 51°35′N 41°29′E
- Country: Russia
- Region: Voronezh Oblast
- District: Ternovsky District
- Time zone: UTC+3:00

Bratki (Russian: Братки) is a rural locality (a selo) and the administrative center of Bratkovskoye Rural Settlement, Ternovsky District, Voronezh Oblast, Russia. The population was 1,095 as of 2018. There are 23 streets.

== Geography ==
Bratki is located 14 km southwest of Ternovka (the district's administrative centre) by road. Kostino-Otdelets is the nearest rural locality.
