= Khopyor Nature Reserve =

Nature reserve in Voronezh Oblast, Russia

- Russian: Хопёрский заповедник (Also: Khopersky)
- IUCN category Ia (strict nature reserve)
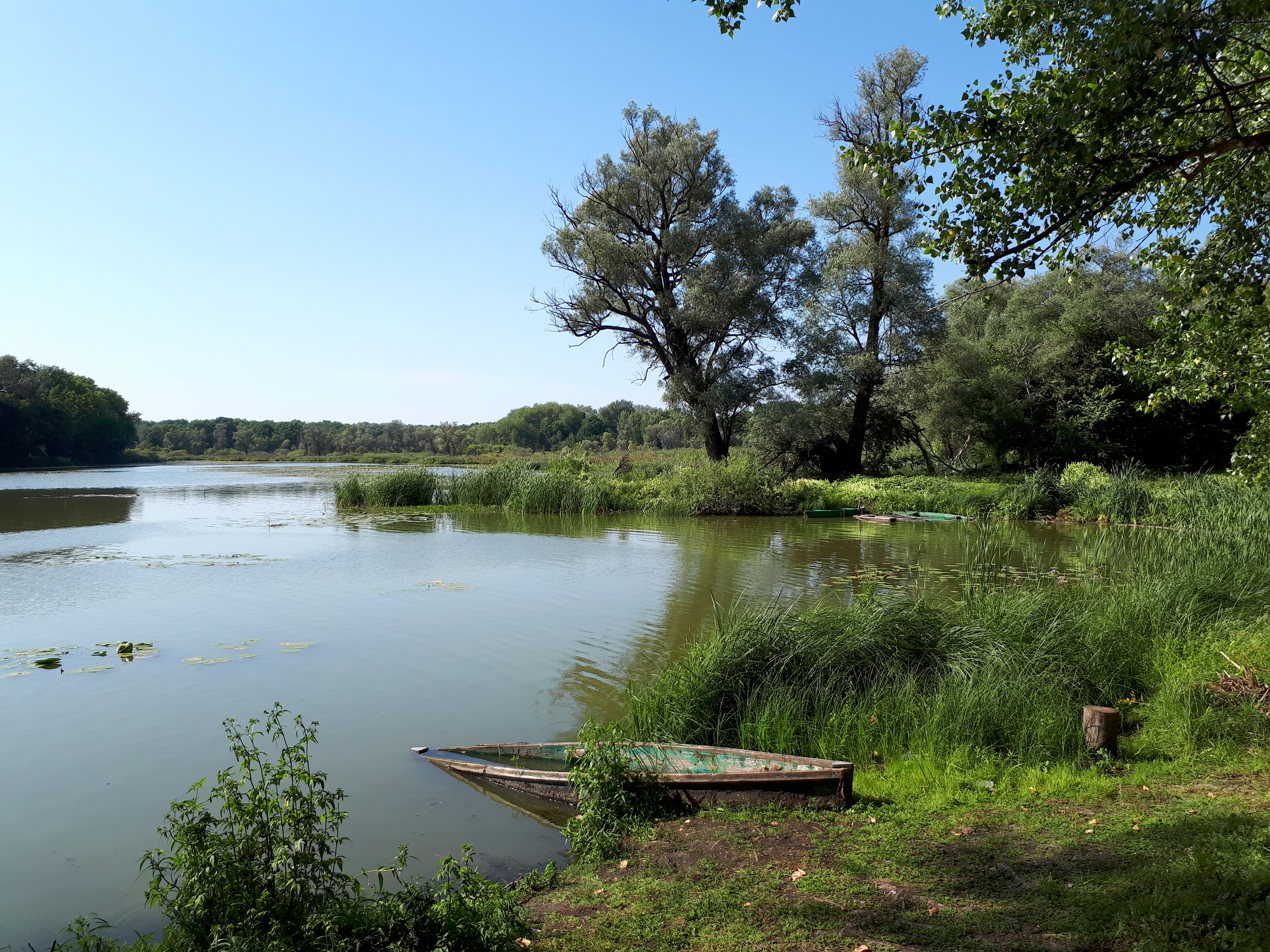

- Location within Russia
- Location: Voronezh Oblast
- Nearest city: Voronezh
- Coordinates: 51°11′41″N 41°43′58″E
- Area: 16,178 hectares (39,977 acres; 62 sq mi)
- Established: 1935
- Governing body: Ministry of Natural Resources and Environment (Russia)
- Website: http://www.hoperzap.ru/index.php

The Khopyor Nature Reserve (Russian: Хопёрский заповедник) (also Khopersky) is a Russian zapovednik (strict nature reserve) that protects a 50-km-long stretch of the Khopyor River in the Voronezh Oblast. About 80% of the area is covered by forests, floodplain, and upland oak woods, with small areas of steppe and meadowlands. There are about 400 lakes and oxbows. The reserve is situated in the Novokhopyorsky District of Voronezh Oblast.

== Topography ==
The Khopyor Reserve has a terrain that is forested floodplains and upland oak woods, along both banks of the Khopyer. The Khopyer river is the largest tributary of the Don River (Russia). During high water, a significant portion of the area in the reserve boundaries may be inundated. About 80% of the area is covered with forests, with steppes and meadows. The Khopyor River and tributary streams meander through the floodplains to leave 400 lakes and oxbows. The floodplains also create grassy bogs and black alder forests. The area is on a post-glacial plain of Quaternary sediments. The width of the reserve ranges from 1.5 km to 9 km.

== Ecoregion and climate ==
Khopyor is located in the East European forest steppe ecoregion, a transition zone between the broadleaf forests of the north and the grasslands to the south.. This ecoregion is characterized by a mosaic of forests, steppe, and riverine wetlands.

The climate of Khopyor is Humid continental climate, warm summer (Köppen climate classification (Dfb)). This climate is characterized by large swings in temperature, both diurnally and seasonally, with mild summers and cold, snowy winters. The coldest month, January, has an average temperature of -6 C degrees; that of July averages 26 C degrees. On average, the precipitation in the reserves averages 553 mm, spread approximately evenly through the year. Annual frost-free period averages 199 days. The winds are predominantly north-westerly.

== Flora and fauna ==
The plant life of the reserve represents a meeting of steppe feather grass and forb steppe/broadleaf grasses. Typical trees are oak coppices, with mixtures of ash, linden, maple and other tree species. Understory contains blackberry, buckthorn, wild rose, and viburnum. Scientists on the reserve have recorded over 1,060 species of vascular plants.

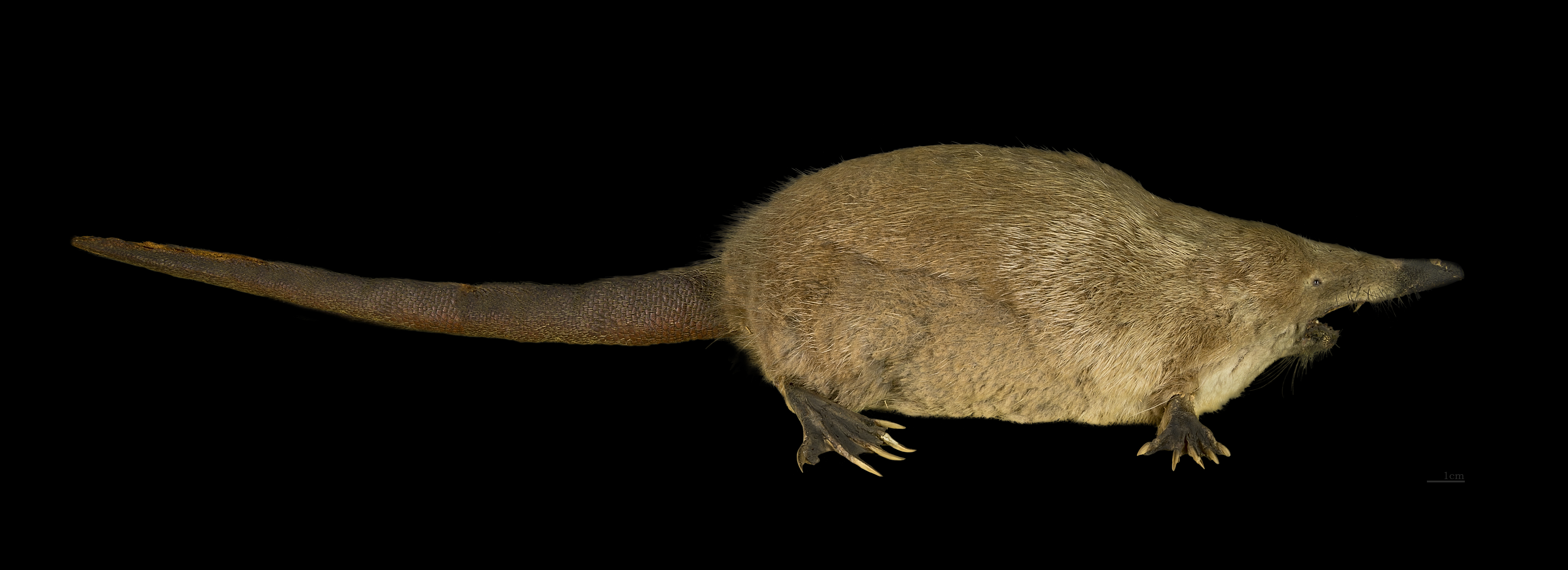
Russian desman (Desmana moschata)

A major focus of the reserve is the preservation of the vulnerable Russian muskrat. Along with the muskrat, the reserve has abundant small mammals - shrews, mice, voles, squirrels, and hares - along with larger red deer, roe deer, elk, and wild boar. Scientists on the reserve have recorded 45 species of mammals 236 species of bird have been recorded, along with 48 species of fish (most commonly carp, roach, perch, tench, and pike). 9 species of amphibian are found -the European fire-bellied toad, common frog, common toad, green frog, lake frog, pond frog, common frog, grass frog, and moor frogs.

== Eco-education and access ==
As a strict nature reserve, the Khopyor Reserve is mostly closed to the general public, although scientists and those with 'environmental education' purposes can make arrangements with park management for visits. There are, nevertheless, six 'eco-tourist' routes in the reserve that are open to the public, but require permits to be obtained in advance. These eco-tourist routes are typically guided hikes of 5-15 km, or motorboat tours. There is one 50-km kayak route that requires advance arrangements. There is also a nature museum that was opened in 1936. The main office is in the village of Varvara Novokhopersk.

== See also ==
- List of Russian Nature Reserves (class 1a 'zapovedniks')
