= Zherdevka =

Zherdevka (Russian: Жердевка) is the name of several inhabited localities in Russia.

Urban localities

- Zherdevka, Tambov Oblast, a town in Zherdevsky District of Tambov Oblast

Rural localities

- Zherdevka, Belgorod Oblast, a khutor in Valuysky District of Belgorod Oblast
