= Yelan (river) =

- Native name: Елань (Russian)

Location
- Country: Russia

Physical characteristics
- Mouth: Savala
  - coordinates: 51.1292°N 41.4466°E
- Length: 165 km (103 mi)
- Basin size: 3,630 km^{2} (1,400 sq mi)

Basin features
- Progression: Savala→ Khopyor→ Don→ Sea of Azov

The Yelan (Russian: Елань) is a river in Voronezh Oblast of Russia. It is a right tributary of the Savala (in the drainage basin of the Don). The Yelan is 165 kilometres (103 mi) long, with a drainage basin of 3,630 square kilometres (1,400 mi^{2}). It flows over the southern part of the Oka–Don Plain. Most of the rivers waters are from melting snow. Its average discharge 26 kilometres (16 mi) from its mouth is 6.8 cubic metres per second (240 cu ft/s).
