= Zherdevka (air base) =

Airport in Tambov Oblast, Russia

Zherdevka Zherdevka-Uvarovo
- Zherdevka, Tambov Oblast in Russia

Site information
- Type: Air Base
- Owner: Ministry of Defence
- Operator: Russian Air Force

Location
- Shown within Tambov Oblast Zherdevka (Russia)
- Coordinates: 51°50′0″N 041°33′0″E

Site history
- Built: 1952
- In use: 1952 - 1999

Airfield information
- Elevation: 149 metres (489 ft) AMSL
Runways
Direction	Length and surface
15/33	2,500 metres (8,202 ft) Concrete

Zherdevka (also Zerdevka) is a disused interceptor aircraft air base in Russia located 7 kilometers (4.3 mi) east of Zherdevka, Tambov Oblast. It was home to the 14th Guards Leningrad Twice Red Banner Order of Suvorov Fighter Aviation Regiment (14th Guards IAP) which flew Mikoyan MiG-29E (NATO: Fulcrum) aircraft from April 21, 1991 until 1999. The regiment was part of the 16th Air Army.

In 1998 (Butuwski) or 1999 (M. Holm), the regiment moved to Khalino, near Kursk.

123rd Training Aviation Regiment used the site between 1952 and 1990. 35th Fighter Aviation Regiment between 1992 and 1996 with the MiG-29.
