= Ternovsky (rural locality) =

Ternovsky or Ternovskoy (Russian: Терновский or Терновской; masculine), Ternovskaya (Терновская; feminine), or Ternovskoye (Терновское; neuter) is the name of several rural localities in Russia:

- Ternovskoy, a khutor in Ternovskoye Rural Settlement of Sholokhovsky District of Rostov Oblast
- Ternovsky, Chertkovsky District, Rostov Oblast, a khutor in Sokhranovskoye Rural Settlement of Chertkovsky District of Rostov Oblast
- Ternovsky, Yegorlyksky District, Rostov Oblast, a khutor in Obyedinennoye Rural Settlement of Yegorlyksky District of Rostov Oblast
- Ternovsky, Stavropol Krai, a khutor in Kazinsky Selsoviet of Andropovsky District of Stavropol Krai
- Ternovsky, Voronezh Oblast, a settlement in Ternovskoye Rural Settlement of Novokhopyorsky District of Voronezh Oblast
- Ternovskaya, Krasnodar Krai, a stanitsa in Ternovsky Rural Okrug of Tikhoretsky District of Krasnodar Krai
- Ternovskaya, Rostov Oblast, a stanitsa in Kalininskoye Rural Settlement of Tsimlyansky District of Rostov Oblast
