= Hennadiy Lysenchuk =

Soviet footballer and coach

Personal information
- Full name: Hennadiy Anatoliyovych Lysenchuk
- Date of birth: 18 December 1947 (age 78)
- Place of birth: Chibizovka, Zherdevsky District, Russian SFSR
- Position: Goalkeeper

Senior career*
Years	Team	Apps	(Gls)
1967	FC Silbud Poltava	0	(0)
1968	FC Dnipro Kremenchuk	4	(0)
1969	FC Shakhtar Kadiivka	16	(0)
1970–1972	FC Zorya Luhansk	1	(0)
1973–1977	SC Tavriya Simferopol	121	(0)
1978–1979	FC Krylya Sovetov Kuibyshev	56	(0)
1980	FC Metalurh Zaporizhia	15	(0)
1982	FC Kolos Nikopol	1	(0)

International career
1979	Russian SFSR		

Managerial career
- 1984–1987: FC Kolos Nikopol
- 1988–1989: FC Sudnobudivnyk Mykolaiv
- 1989: FC Vorskla Poltava (assistant)
- 1990: FC Vorskla Poltava
- 1990–1991: FC Kryvbas Kryvyi Rih
- 1994–2012: Ukraine (futsal)
- * Club domestic league appearances and goals

Hennadiy Lysenchuk (Ukrainian: Геннадій Анатолійович Лисенчук, born 18 December 1947 in Zherdevsky District) is a former Soviet footballer and coach.

== Career ==
Lysenchuk started his professional career in the Soviet First League in 1968–1969 playing for Ukrainian clubs from Kremenchuk and Kadiivka. In 1970 he made his debut in the Soviet Top League playing for FC Zorya Luhansk.

After not actively playing in Voroshilovgrad, in 1973 Lysenchuk signed with SC Tavriya Simferopol with which he became champions of Ukraine and spent the next four years. While playing in the First League, in 1978 he signed with Krylya Sovetov and earned promotion to the Top League. In 1979 Lysenchuk was the main goalie for the Volga team at the Soviet top division. He also represented the Russian football team at the Soviet Spartakiad of the Peoples of the USSR.

In 1980–1981 Lysenchuk played for Ukrainian club from Zaporizhia and Poltava and for FC Dnipro reserve team in the Soviet reserve competitions. In 1982 he signed with FC Kolos Nikopol, but soon retired.

After a short while Lysenchuk was appointed a head coach of FC Kolos Nikopol which he managed until 1987. In 1988–1989 he managed Sudostroitel Nikolayev (MFC Mykolaiv). In 1989–1990 he coached in Poltava first as an assistant, but later as a head coach. After that and until dissolution of the Soviet Union in 1991, Lysenchuk led FC Kryvbas Kryvyi Rih.

In independent Ukraine since 1993 Lysenchuk was heading the Ukrainian association of futsal. In 1995 he lost elections to become president of the Football Federation of Ukraine to Viktor Bannikov.
