= Yelan, Kabansky District, Republic of Buryatia =

Yelan Елань
- Selo
- Location within Republic of Buryatia Location within Russia
- Coordinates: 52°00′N 106°41′E
- Country: Russia
- Region: Republic of Buryatia
- District: Kabansky District
- Time zone: UTC+8:00

Yelan (Russian: Елань) is a rural locality (a selo) in Kabansky District, Republic of Buryatia, Russia. The population was 423 as of 2010. There are 7 streets.

== Geography ==
Yelan is located 9 km north of Kabansk (the district's administrative centre) by road. Nyuki is the nearest rural locality.
