= Babino, Voronezh Oblast =

Babino Бабино
- Village
- Location within Voronezh Oblast Location within Russia
- Coordinates: 51°36′N 41°37′E
- Country: Russia
- Region: Voronezh Oblast
- District: Ternovsky District
- Time zone: UTC+3:00

Babino (Russian: Бабино) is a rural locality (a village) in Ternovskoye Rural Settlement, Ternovsky District, Voronezh Oblast, Russia. The population was 70 as of 2010. There are 3 streets.
