= Babino, Vologda Oblast =

Babino Бабино
- Village
- Location within Vologda Oblast Location within Russia
- Coordinates: 59°49′N 40°50′E
- Country: Russia
- Region: Vologda Oblast
- District: Syamzhensky District
- Time zone: UTC+3:00

Babino (Russian: Бабино) is a rural locality (a village) in Zhityovskoye Rural Settlement, Syamzhensky District, Vologda Oblast, Russia. The population was 25 in year 2002.

== Geography ==
Babino is located 28 km southwest of Syamzha (the district's administrative centre) by road. Podlesnaya is the nearest rural locality.
