= Babino, Berane Municipality =

Babino Бабино
- Village
- Location within Montenegro
- Coordinates: 42.903959°N 19.903419°E
- Country: Montenegro
- Municipality: Berane

Population (2023)
  - Total: 331
- Time zone: UTC+1 (CET)
  - Summer (DST): UTC+2 (CEST)

Babino (Serbian Cyrillic: Бабино) is a village in the municipality of Berane, Montenegro.

== Demographics ==
According to the 2023 census, its population was 331.

Ethnicity in 2011
Ethnicity	Number	Percentage
Serbs	316	76.5%
Montenegrins	59	14.3%
other/undeclared	38	9.2%
Total	413	100%
