= Babino, Vladimir Oblast =

Babino Бабино
- Village
- Location within Vladimir Oblast Location within Russia
- Coordinates: 55°41′N 40°44′E
- Country: Russia
- Region: Vladimir Oblast
- District: Gus-Khrustalny District
- Time zone: UTC+3:00

Babino (Russian: Ба́бино) is a rural locality (a village) in Posyolok Anopino, Gus-Khrustalny District, Vladimir Oblast, Russia. The population was 36 as of (2021 census); 31 as of 2010. There is 1 street.

== Geography ==
Babino is located 11 km northeast of Gus-Khrustalny (the district's administrative centre) by road. Vashutino is the nearest rural locality.
