= Zherdevsky District =

Zherdevsky District Жердевский район (Russian)
- District
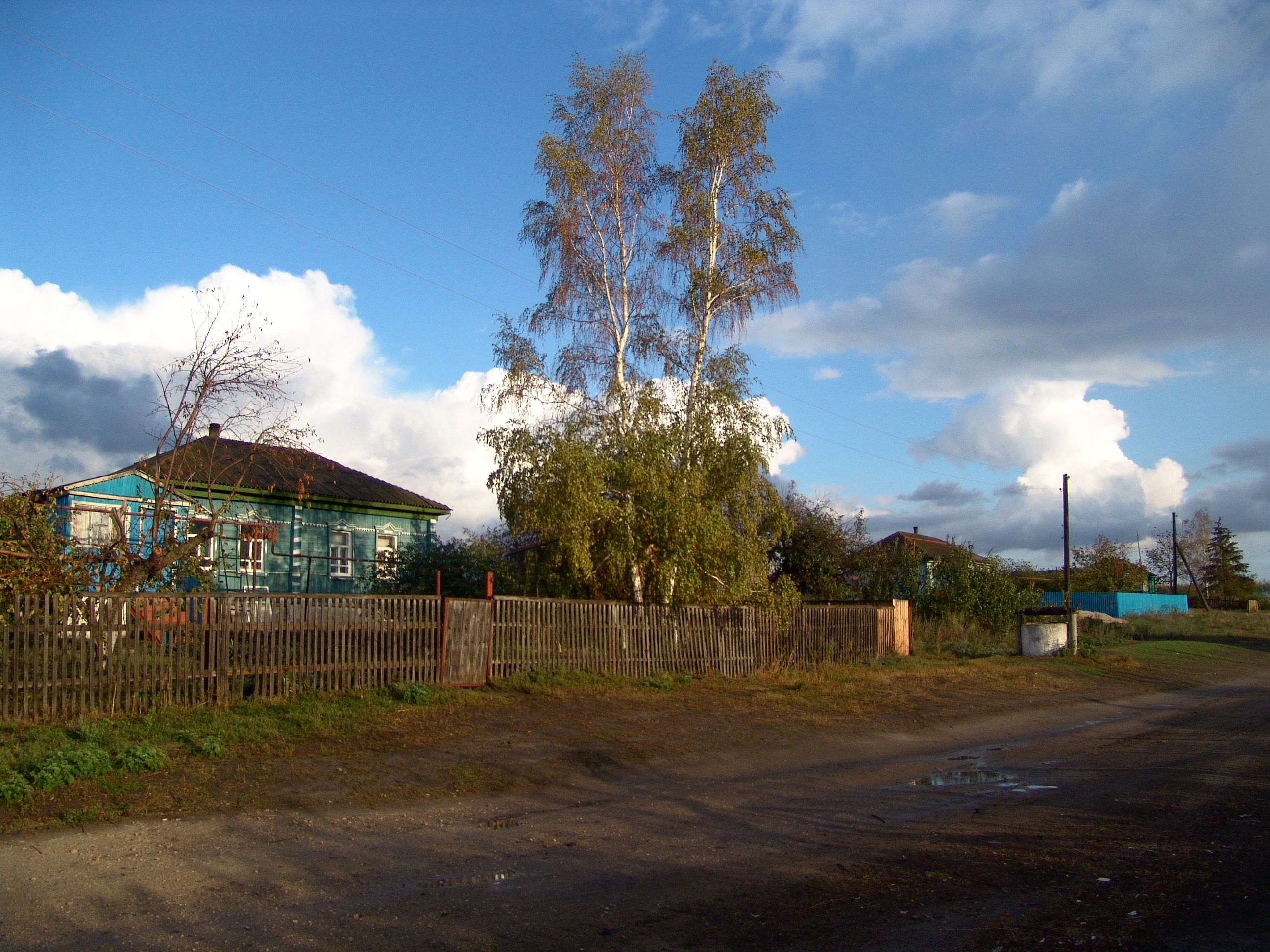
- The selo of Sukmanovka in Zherdevsky District

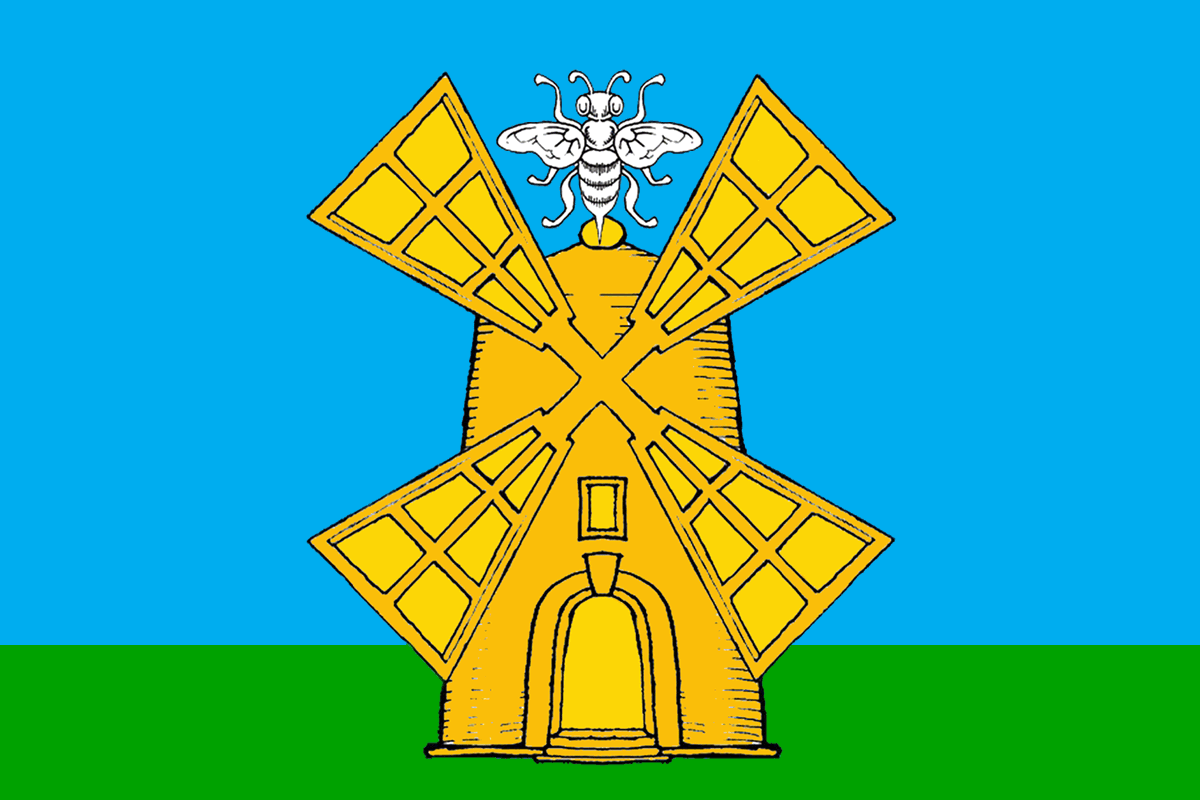
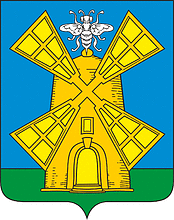
- Flag Coat of arms
- Location of Zherdevsky District in Tambov Oblast
- Coordinates: 51°50′N 41°28′E
- Country: Russia
- Federal subject: Tambov Oblast
- Established: 1928
- Administrative center: Zherdevka

Area
  - Total: 1,397.77 km^{2} (539.68 sq mi)

Population (2010 Census)
  - Total: 30,331
  - Density: 21.700/km^{2} (56.202/sq mi)
  - Urban: 50.1%
  - Rural: 49.9%

Administrative structure
  - Administrative divisions: 1 Towns of district significance, 11 Selsoviets
  - Inhabited localities: 1 cities/towns, 68 rural localities

Municipal structure
  - Municipally incorporated as: Zherdevsky Municipal District
  - Municipal divisions: 1 urban settlements, 11 rural settlements
- Time zone: UTC+3 (MSK)
- OKTMO ID: 68604000
- Website: http://r35.tambov.gov.ru/

Zherdevsky District (Russian: Же́рдевский райо́н) is an administrative and municipal district (raion), one of the twenty-three in Tambov Oblast, Russia. It is located in the south of the oblast. The district borders with Rzhaksinsky District in the north, Uvarovsky District in the east, Ternovsky District of Voronezh Oblast in the south, and with Tokaryovsky District in the west. The area of the district is 1,397.77 square kilometers (539.68 sq mi). Its administrative center is the town of Zherdevka. Population: 30,331 (2010 Census); 33,502 (2002 census); 38,944 (1989 Soviet census). The population of Zherdevka accounts for 50.1% of the district's total population.

== Notable residents ==
- Ivan Fioletov (1884–1918), revolutionary activist, born in Tugolukovo
- Hennadiy Lysenchuk (born 1947), football player and coach, born in Chibizovka
