= Yelan, Republic of Bashkortostan =

Yelan Елань
- Village
- Location within Bashkortostan Location within Russia
- Coordinates: 53°52′N 57°41′E
- Country: Russia
- Region: Bashkortostan
- District: Beloretsky District
- Time zone: UTC+5:00

Yelan (Russian: Елань; Bashkir: Ялан, Yalan) is a rural locality (a village) in Ishlinsky Selsoviet, Beloretsky District, Bashkortostan, Russia. The population was five as of 2010. There are three streets.

== Geography ==
Yelan is located 62 km west of Beloretsk (the district's administrative centre) by road. Bzyak is the nearest rural locality.
