= Free ploughman =

Free ploughmen (Russian: Во́льные хлебопа́шцы, Свободные хлебопашцы were a category of peasants in the Russian Empire in 19th century.

This was the official reference to the Russian serfs freed from serfdom within the framework of the February 20, 1803 decree of Alexander I of Russia "Указ об отпуске помещиками своих крестьян на волю по заключении условий, основанных на обоюдном согласии", informally known as the Decree on Free Ploughmen. As the title of the decree says, the serf were freed and endowed with land by the will on the serf owner under certain conditions: payment or obligations to carry out certain works. During the reign of Alexander I only about 7,300 male peasants (with families) or about 0.5% of serfs were freed.

== See also ==
- Abolition of serfdom in Livonia
- Emancipation reform of 1861
