= Khopyor =

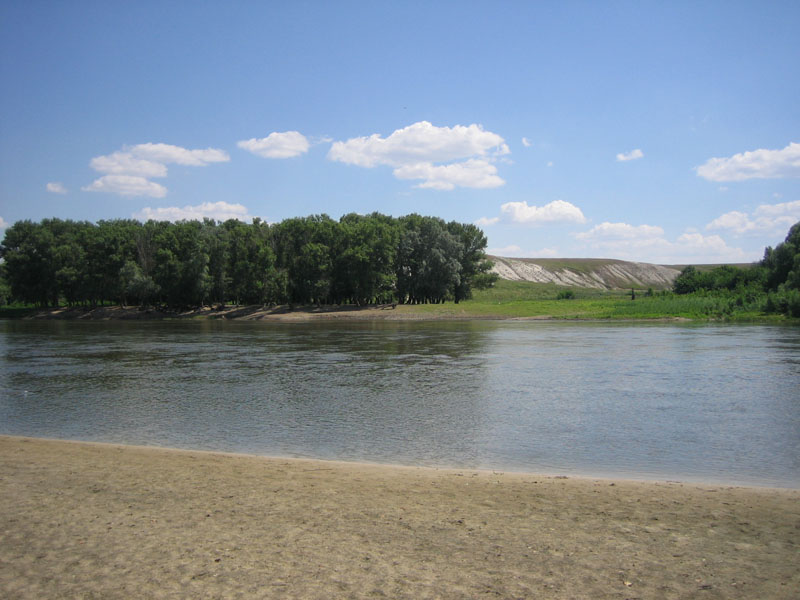

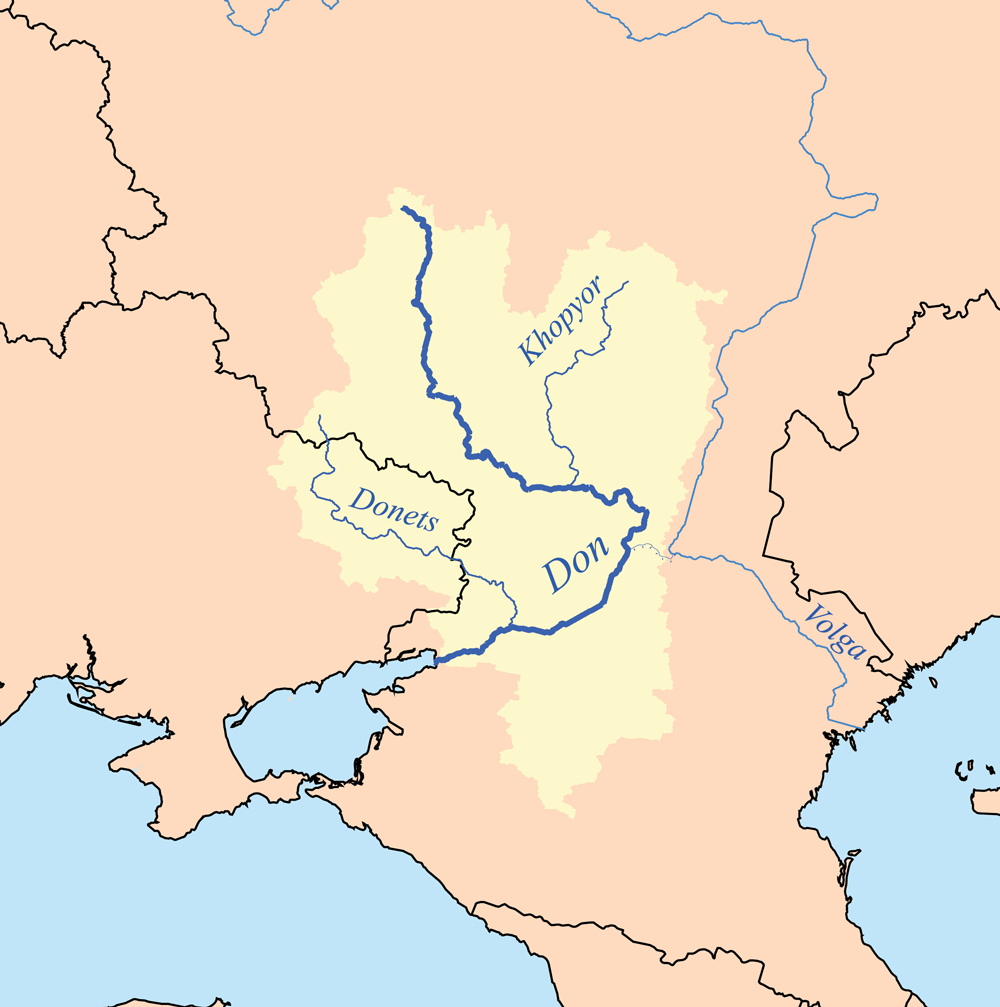
- The Khopyor in the Don river basin.
- Native name: Хопёр (Russian)

Location
- Country: Russia

Physical characteristics
- Mouth: Don
  - coordinates: 49°36′23″N 42°18′29″E
- Length: 979 km (608 mi)
- Basin size: 61,100 km^{2} (23,600 sq mi)

Basin features
- Progression: Don→ Sea of Azov

The Khopyor (Russian: Хопёр, also transliterated as Khoper) is a river in European Russia, the biggest left tributary of the river Don. It is 979 kilometres (608 mi) long, with a watershed of 61,100 square kilometres (23,600 mi^{2}). The mouth width is 300 metres (980 ft). The Khopyor is navigable up to 323 kilometres (201 mi) from the mouth. The maximum discharge is 3,720 cubic metres per second (131,000 cu ft/s); the average discharge is 150 cubic metres per second (5,300 cu ft/s), and the minimum discharge is 45 cubic metres per second (1,600 cu ft/s).

Fish in the river include bream, zander, common roach, rudd, European chub, ide, bleak, catfish, pike, perch, asp and burbot.

Found near the river elks, hares, herons, swans, eagles, falcons, owls, nightingales, ducks, beavers, pond turtles, snakes (vipers), etc. Previously, there were bison, now exterminated.

The unique nature made Khopyor a favorite place for tourists.

== Tributaries ==
The largest tributaries of the Khopyor are, from source to mouth:

- Serdoba (left)
- Vorona (right)
- Savala (right)
- Buzuluk (left)

== Towns ==
Towns on the Khopyor River in orographic sequence (from source to mouth) are:

- Balashov,
- Borisoglebsk
- Uryupinsk
- Novokhopyorsk
- Serafimovich.

Downstream from Borisoglebsk, is the Khopyor Nature Reserve, populated with protected beavers, wisents and Russian desman. It also has various protected flora including Iris tenuifloia.

== Cultural associations ==
In 1834, Mikhail Zagoskin published a collection of ghost stories entitled An Evening on the Khoper River.

According to legend, an oldman Hopper lived in these places of Penza Oblast. One day he went by steppe and saw 12 springs. The old man took a shovel and assembled all the springs in one big stream. On this stream oldman Hopper built a mill to grind grain for the peasants from nearby villages. Later the river was given the name of its creator.

The river gave its name to the Khoper-Invest company, infamous for its pyramid scheme fraud.
