= Savala (river) =

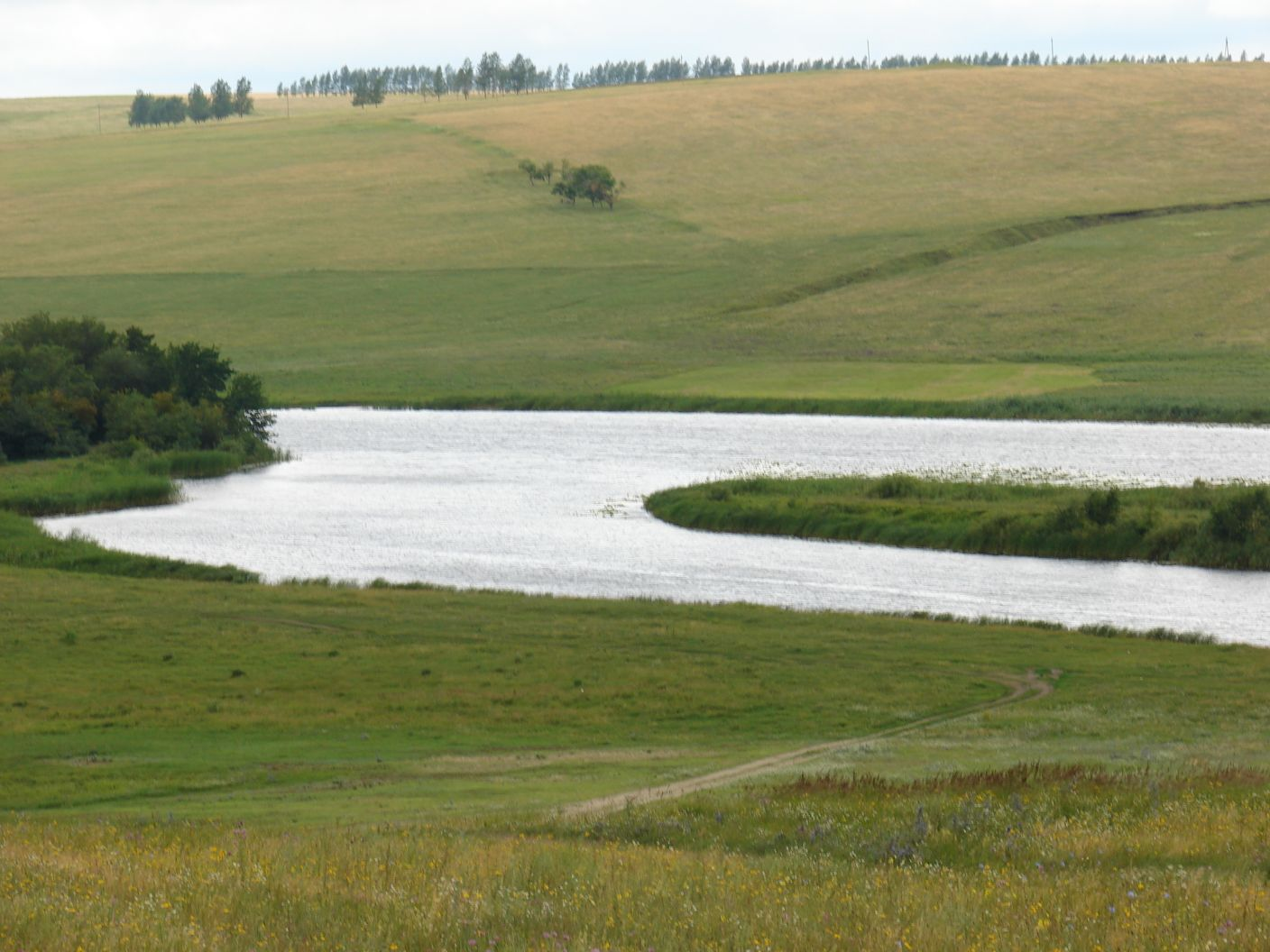

Location
- Country: Russia

Physical characteristics
- Mouth: Khopyor
  - coordinates: 51.0464°N 41.6779°E
- Length: 285 km (177 mi)
- Basin size: 7,720 km^{2} (2,980 sq mi)
- Discharge
  - average: 20 m^{3}/s (710 cu ft/s)

Basin features
- Progression: Khopyor→ Don→ Sea of Azov
- Tributaries
  - right: Yelan

The Savala (Russian: Савала) is a river in the Tambov and Voronezh oblasts of Russia. It is a right tributary of the Khopyor (a tributary of the Don). The Savala is 285 kilometres (177 mi) long, with a drainage basin of 7,720 square kilometres (2,980 mi^{2}). It flows over the southern part of the Oka–Don Lowland. Its main tributary is the Yelan. Most of the river's waters are from melting snow. Its average discharge is 20 cubic metres per second (710 cu ft/s). It freezes over in late November, and stays icebound until the spring thaw starts in late March or early April. The town of Zherdevka is along the banks of the Savala.
