= Ternovka, Ternovsky District, Voronezh Oblast =

Rural locality in Voronezh Oblast, Russia

Ternovka Терновка
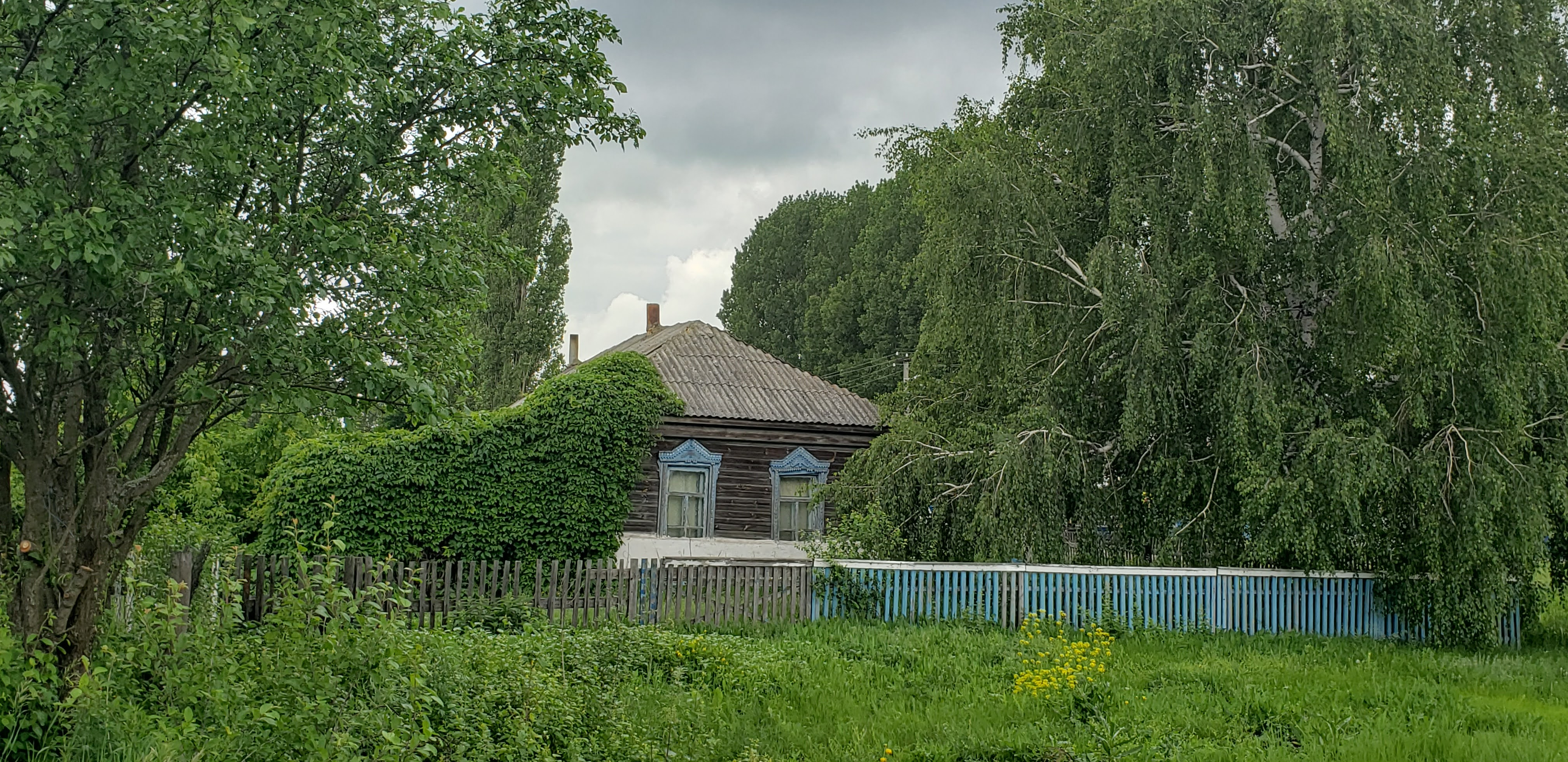
- Interactive map of Ternovka
- Location of Ternovka
- Coordinates: 51°40′34″N 41°36′22″E
- Country: Russia
- Federal subject: Voronezh Oblast
- Founded: 1869

Population
  - Estimate (2021): 4,977 )
- Time zone: UTC+3 (MSK)
- Postal code: 397110
- OKTMO ID: 20654460101

Ternovka (Russian: Терно́вка) is a rural locality (a selo) and the administrative center of Ternovsky District of Voronezh Oblast, Russia and Ternovsky rural settlement (Ternovsky district), which include Ternovka village, Babino village, Dolina Village, village of Savalskogo lesnichestva, village of Savalskogo leskhoza, Novokirsanovka village, Rzhavets village, the village of Tyumenevka. Population: 4,977 (2021 census);

The village is located in the northeast of Voronezh Oblast next to the Ternovka river, which flows through the village in its east, and two artificial reservoirs, Pyatnadtsatyy Pond and Novy Pond, which are located in the northeast of the village. South Eastern Railway passes through the village, which formally divides it into "center" and "behind the line".

== Population ==
Population
| 1730 | 1763 | 1782 | 1862 | 1959 | 1970 | 1979 | 1989 | 2002 | 2010 | 2021 |
|---|---|---|---|---|---|---|---|---|---|---|
| 3 | ↗150 | ↗430 | ↗1623 | ↗3261 | ↗4555 | ↘4275 | ↗ 5,158 (1989 Soviet census) | ↘ 4,769 (2002 census); | ↗ 5,671 (2010 census); | ↗4,977 (2021 census); |

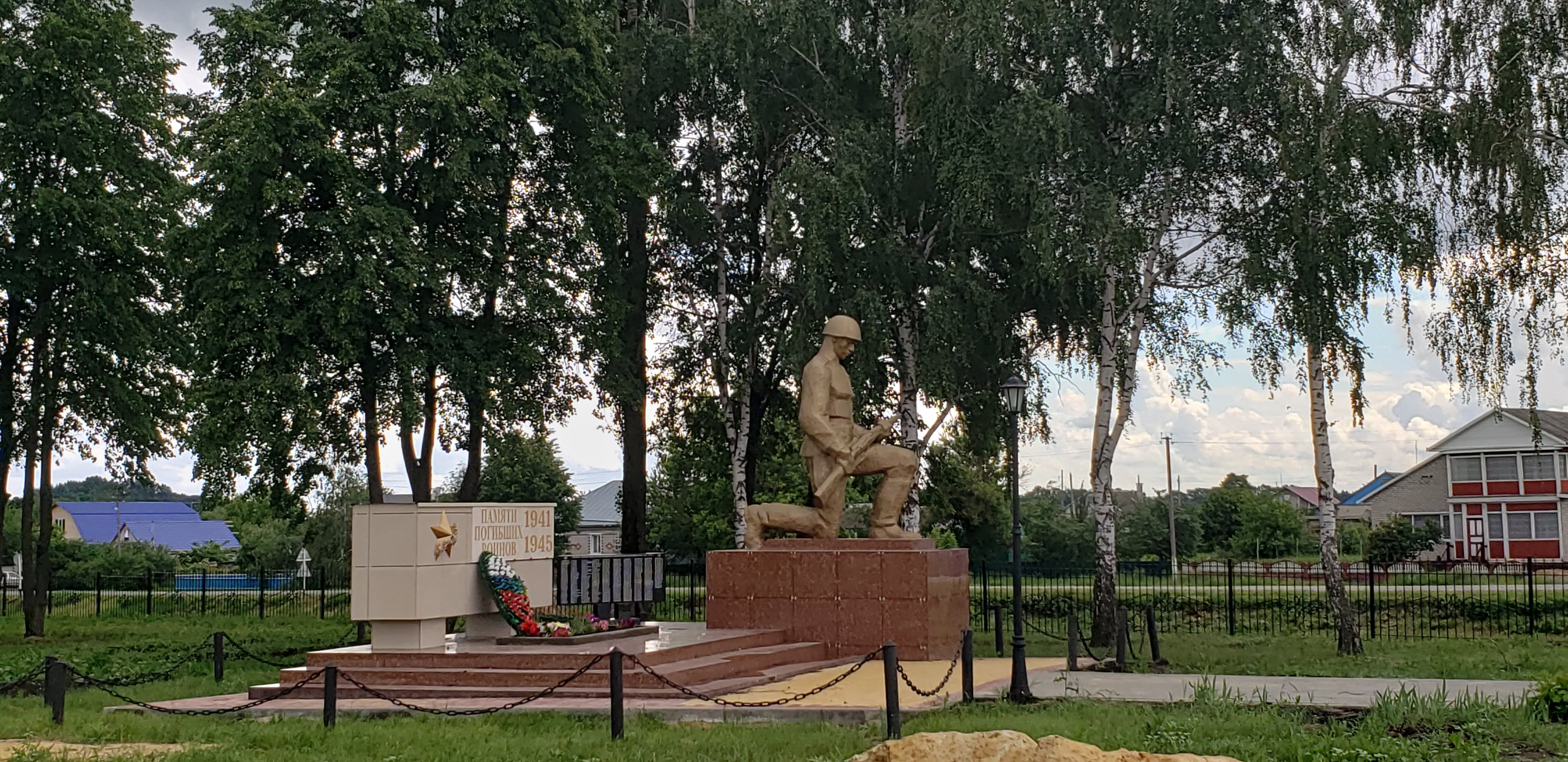
In memory of fallen soldiers 1941-1945

Statistical numbers reflect transformations of rural settlements by merging, so reflect not only Ternovka village population, but including all villages in Ternovsky rural settlement.

Many Ternovka residents fought and died during the First World War 1914-1918.

There is Mass grave of people died in 1919 in Revolution in Russia 1902–1922, Russian Civil War 1918-1921: Tambov Rebellion called Antonovshina of 1920–1921, Kolesnikovshchina.

Repressions

During Second World War 1941-1945 1185 Ternovka people were recruited to fight against Nazis. 756 Ternovka people died fighting the Nazis. For military merit during the World War II two natives of the Ternovka were awarded the high title of Hero of the Soviet Union: foreman of the 342nd rifle regiment of the 136th division of the 67th army, a native of the village Dubovitskoe (abolished nowadays, it was located near Ternovka village) Ivan Antonovich Lapshev and Lieutenant General of Aviation Alexei Alekseevich Plokhov. The Memorial to the fallen soldiers was built to commemorate the 40th anniversary of the Victory in the Second World War against Nazis.

== Etymology ==
Ternovka was named in the 19th century after the small river Ternovka, along the banks of which wild thorns grew abundantly. There is famous blackthorn liqueur, which can be home made.

Ternovka (Borisoglebsky Uyezd, Tambov Governorate) appeared on the old maps as: Ternowka Ternavka, Ternovka

Krestovozdvizhenskoye, because the temple of the village was consecrated in honor of the Exaltation of the True Cross of the Lord.

Novosiltsovo (Ternovoe) (1730) Ternovka Pushkareva, Ternovka Mansaurova, Ternovka Tsipletova, Ternovka Babina, Ternovka (Sadovka), Babino, Panovo, Panino ( Novosiltsovo (Ternovka)), Kondourovo, Chubrovskoe, Pushkarevo, Gavrilovka after names of landowners

Ternowka

== History ==
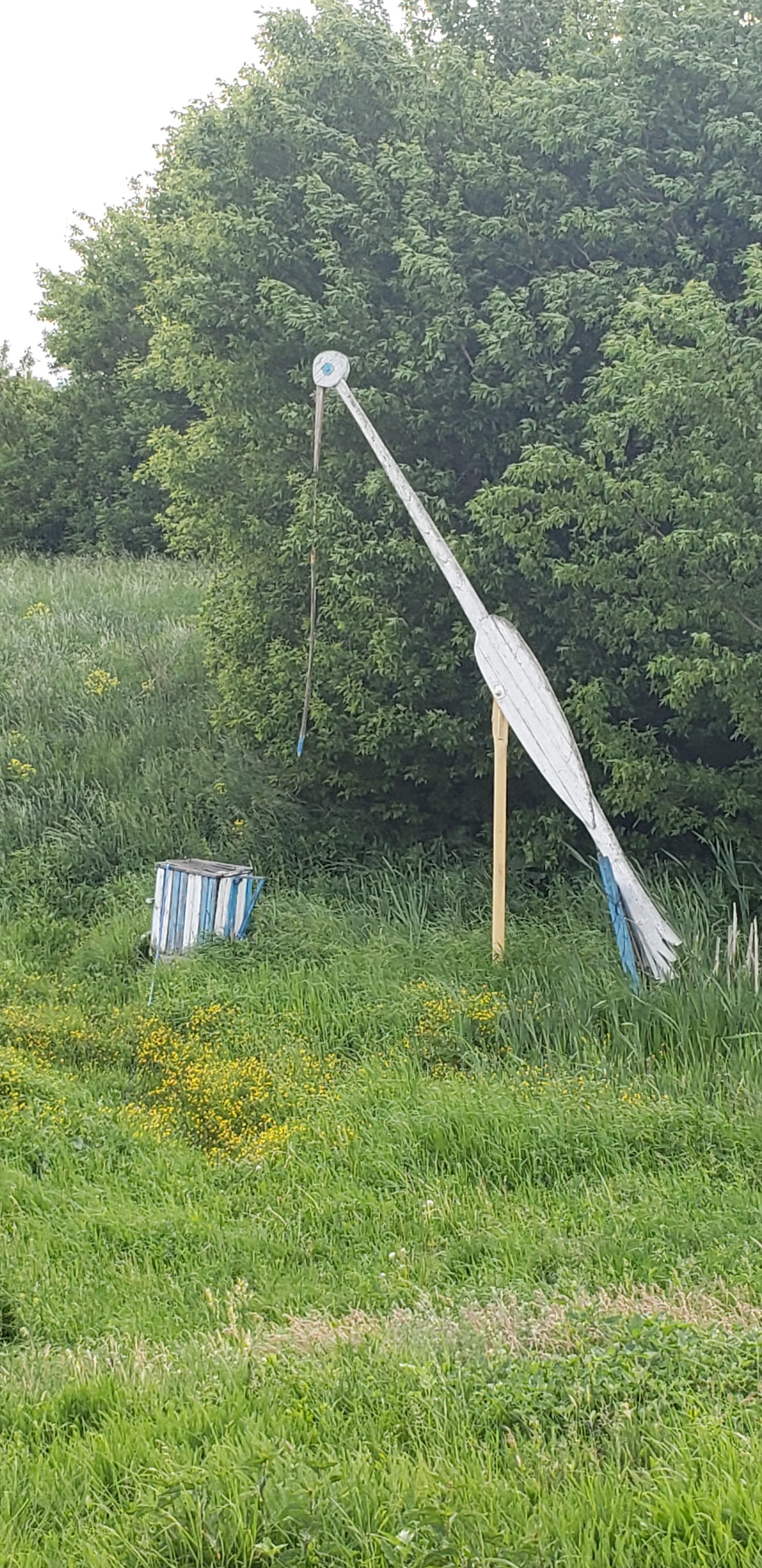
Heron Water Well Ternovka, Ternovsky District, Voronezh Oblast

Ternovka was founded in 1730 by free peasants, called themselves free farmers. Landowner Major Nikita Vasilyevich Novosiltsov with a group of his serfs settled next to them and built a manor house.

According to the "revision tales" of 1763, the population of Ternovka was 150 people. In 1766 Novosiltsov died, his estate went to numerous heirs. After that, “revision tales” named two Panovs, two Kondourovs, Okorokov and Tsyplyatev among the owners of serfs.

In the "revision tales" of the Borisoglebsky district of 1782, it is indicated that the village along the banks of the Ternovka River and the pond has a wooden church, a smithy and a mill. In addition to the serfs, there are also “free ploughmen” of 47 households (430 inhabitants) living here.

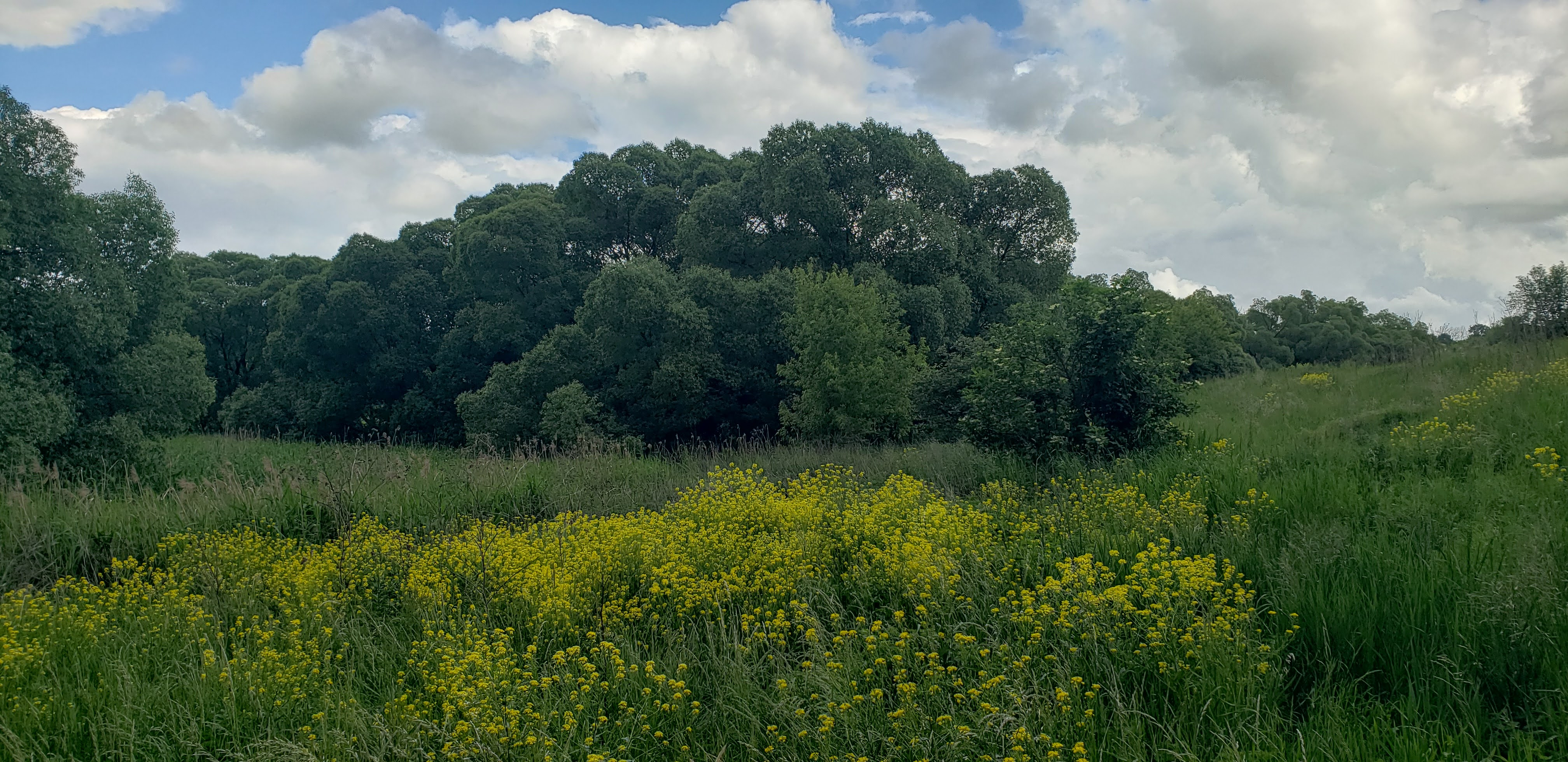
Small river Ternovka (tributary of Karachan) along the banks of which wild thorn grows abundantly

Particular attention in the Diocesan Gazette is given to the description of the liberation of the peasants of the landowner Panova from serfdom 50 years before the complete abolition of serfdom in Russia. This is the most outstanding fact of the history of this village. Many facts of the Diocesan Gazette are presented from the words of Ternovka, Agap Dmitrievich Simonov. According to deacon Tsoptaev, by the end of the century he was already a deep old man, saying: “When the Frenchman was in Moscow, I was 15 years old,” which means that the approximate date of his birth was 1797. According to Agap Simonov, the idea of letting the peasants go free and transferring the land to them was born by Evdokia Nikitovna Panova after the death of her husband, State Councilor Afanasy Grigorievich Panov on July 18, 1806. The woman found the opportunity to implement her decision in the first paragraph of the Decree of Emperor Alexander I to the Senate of February 20, 1803 “On free ploughmen”. In describing the conditions for the release of the peasants of Ternovka, Pavel Tsoptaev relies on the original document - the petition of Evdokia Nikitovna Panova addressed to Emperor Alexander Pavlovich, dated January 10, 1811. According to the priest, “this condition in the original has survived intact to this day, it is written on stamped paper, of a thirty-kopeck denomination, the year 1809 is listed on the seal.” This document has not yet been found in the archives of the Tambov and Voronezh regions. The deacon claims that the landowner asked for permission to let 156 revision souls (i.e. male) living in the villages of Ternovka and Afanasievka, the land area of 3197 acres with all the land and mills, for free arable farming with the provision of their own land. According to the terms of the petition, the peasants were supposed to receive freedom after her death. Evdokia Panova had no children, and other heirs were ordered not to intervene. The second paragraph of the petition was indicated: for 15 years, the peasants should pay 300 rubles each to the Tambov parish of public charity, and in addition, build decent houses for the courtyard people of the widow. A special clause noted that the manor house with annexes, a courtyard, as well as a garden, were not transferred to the peasants, they had to be sold, and the money transferred to decorate the church. Local historian Prokhorov V.A., the author of the historical and toponymic dictionary “All Voronezh Land”, believes that this historical fact could not be a manifestation of the humanity of the landowner, most likely it was decided to release the peasants due to some kind of necessity. The detailed study of the history of the village, compiled by deacon Tsoptaev, which describes in detail the moral qualities of the lady Panova: “she observed the family life of the peasants”, “took care of their religious and moral needs”, “protected them from insults from neighboring landowners ", thus the fact of liberation from serfdom of the peasants is a manifestation of God-fearing and humanity of the widow Evdokia Nikitovna Panova. Other landlords of Ternovka did not follow the example of Panova. The directory of the Tambov province of 1862 says: “The state-owned and owner's village Novosiltsevo (Ternovka) near the Ternovka River, on the postal route from Borisoglebsk to Tambov, 48 miles from Borisoglebsk, 12 miles from Rusanovo. Yards 193, men 806, women 817, church. As a result, it turns out that on the eve of the abolition of serfdom Ternovka was considered an owner and state-owned village, since part of its inhabitants were serfs.

In the 19th century, Ternovka belonged to the Borisoglebsky Uyezd Tambov Governorate. Most researchers of the history of the village rely on the evidence of the Diocesan Record on the History of Villages of the Tambov Diocese, preserved in the Tambov Archive. It dates from 1889. The history of Ternovka was compiled by deacon Pavel Tsoptaev. According to the clergyman the village was called Novosiltsov by the name of the wife-owner, the widow Evdokia Fyodorovna Novosiltsova. After her death, the village was inherited by her daughter, married Evdokia Nikitovna Panova.

The nature of the village of Ternovka is unusually picturesque, largely due to the amazing beauty of the Savalsky forest, created by human hands in the dry steppe. Registration of the forestry as an economic unit dates back to 1861, which is mentioned by the forester M.S. Bogolyubov in a memorandum of 1897 to the Tambov Department of Agriculture and State Property. It then consisted of forest tracts scattered in the steppe. The forest were located 5-12 km from each other and were surrounded by the so-called dues - agricultural land for leasing to the local population. On June 13, 1868, the Tambov Advisory Commission on the Arrangement decided: “Combine quitrents with forest dachas and gradually afforest them, mainly by sowing acorns.” The work on afforestation was led by an unusually purposeful, energetic and creative person - Bogolyubov M.S. The chief forester planted 561 hectares of forest. More than 10 years of tireless work Bogolyubov invested in the afforestation of two meadow terraces on the left bank of the Savala. The loose sands of this area were completely barren. The forester tried different ways of laying crops, care methods, mixing species. The first experiments were not entirely successful. When surveying crops and plantings in 1883, there were 92 hectares of dead crops and 164 hectares of not entirely successful ones, as indicated in the reports of the forestry. Acorn crops in 1890 and 1892 on an area of 44 hectares also died from frost and drought. The failures did not embarrass the energetic owner of the forest, M.S. Bogolyubov. From 1893, he began to correct the affected crops by replenishing them with oak and pine, in some places introducing Russian olive, Caragana arborescens and elm. Periods of failure were replaced by successes, everything was done by trial and error, because these were the first steps in afforestation in the steppe. Thanks to the hard work and selfless love for his work, M.S. Bogolyubov, today the Savalsky forest is the pearl of this region and stands guard over fertile soils.

In 1869, the Gryazi - Borisoglebsk railway line of South Eastern railway passed near the village and railway station Ternovka has been established.

In the second half of January 1918, Soviet was already established in the village.

In 1929 it was in Borisoglebsky district of Central Black Earth Oblast.

Collectivization began in 1929–1930. Interesting facts can be learned from the Krasnoye Znamya newspaper: “In 1933, the first wheeled tractor appeared in the village of Ternovka, and later the collective farm acquired a threshing machine. In 1933, a car with a carrying capacity of 1.5 tons appeared in the village. It is also interesting that the first driver was a simple peasant woman Simonova.

Around the Ternovka station, a settlement was growing, which become the center of the Ternovsky district.

In 1932 Ternovka was in Ternovsky district, as Borisoglebsky district renamed.

In 1932 Ternovka was in Ternovsky district of Voronezh Oblast, as Central Black Earth Oblast has been divided between Kursk Oblast and Voronezh Oblast.

In 1954 Ternovka was in Ternovsky district of Balashov region of Russian SFSR

In 1957 Ternovka was in Voronezh Oblast.

In 1962 Ternovka was in Gribanovsky District, as Ternovsky district was liquidated.

In 1964 Ternovka was in Ternovsky district.

In the 1960s and 1970s, the construction of civilian facilities began. The railway, which runs in the direction from north to south, divided the station settlement into two parts: the old one (Pervomayskaya street) and the new one (Sovetskaya street). The center of the village has been moved several times.

In 1982, the Ternovka station settlement and the village of Ternovka were merged into a single administrative unit - the village of Ternovka.

In 1985, the construction of a cultural and sports complex was completed, which included a Regional Palace of Culture with an auditorium for 380 seats and a stadium.

Nowadays the village has two libraries (regional and rural), a post office, a savings bank, an outpatient clinic, a hospital, and three kindergartens. There are three schools in Ternovka.

Regional festival of folk music "Savalskye rossypi".

== People ==
Metropolitan Anthony (in the world Ivan Ivanovich Cheremisov; born November 17, 1939, Ternovka, Ternovsky district, Voronezh region) - bishop of the Russian Orthodox Church

== See also ==
Natural Monuments protected in Ternovsky District

Cultural heritage in Ternovsky district
