= Ternovsky District =

Ternovsky District Терновский район (Russian)
- District
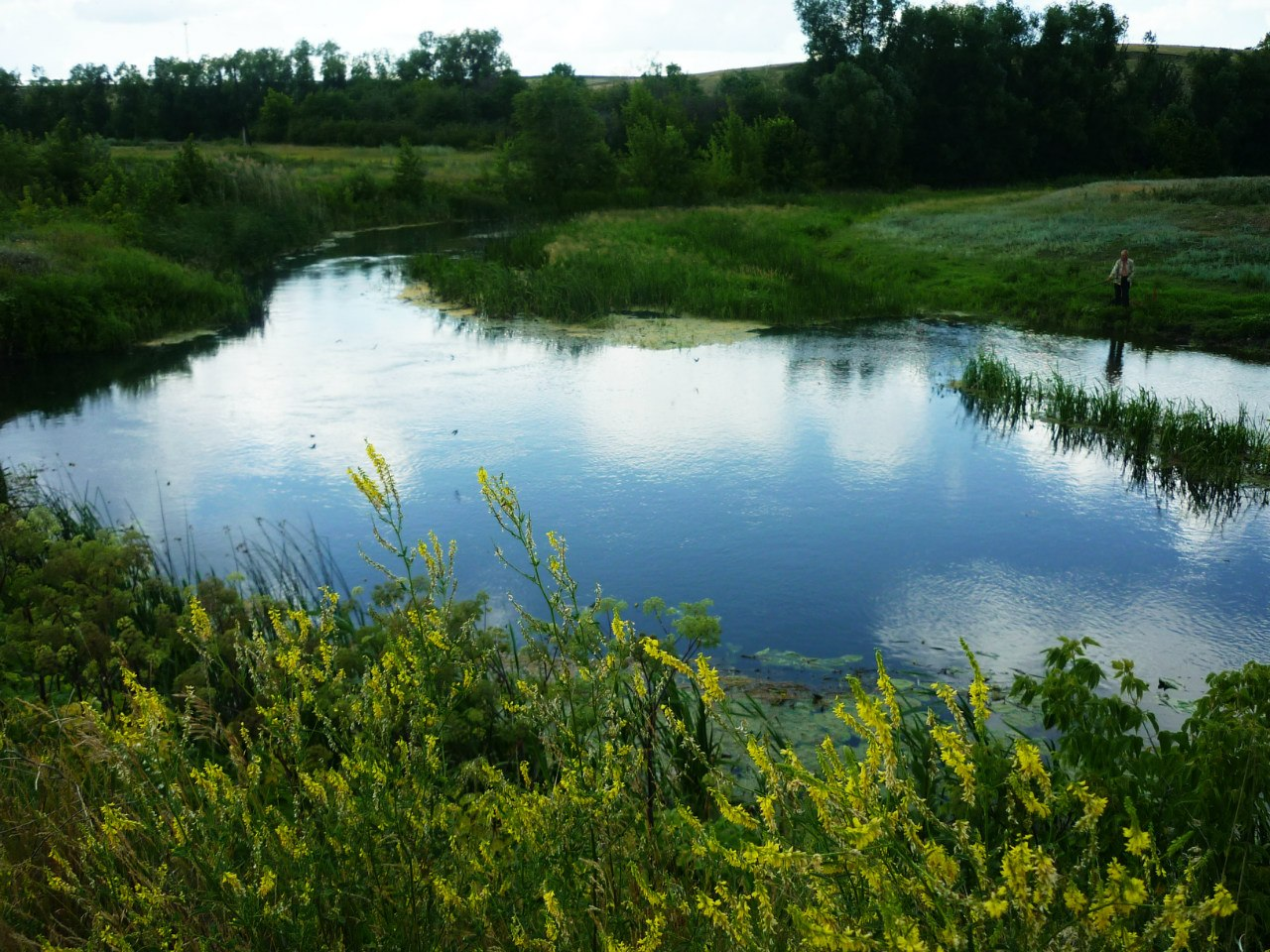
- The Savala River near the selo of Bratki in Ternovsky District

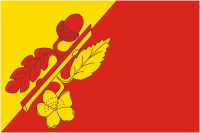
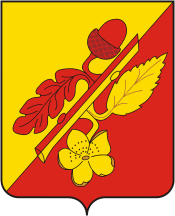
- Flag Coat of arms
- Location of Ternovsky District in Voronezh Oblast
- Coordinates: 51°40′35″N 41°37′51″E
- Country: Russia
- Federal subject: Voronezh Oblast
- Established: 1929
- Administrative center: Ternovka

Area
  - Total: 1,391 km^{2} (537 sq mi)

Population (2010 Census)
  - Total: 22,125
  - Density: 15.91/km^{2} (41.20/sq mi)
  - Urban: 0%
  - Rural: 100%

Administrative structure
  - Administrative divisions: 14 Rural settlements
  - Inhabited localities: 41 rural localities

Municipal structure
  - Municipally incorporated as: Ternovsky Municipal District
  - Municipal divisions: 0 urban settlements, 14 rural settlements
- Time zone: UTC+3 (MSK)
- OKTMO ID: 20654000
- Website: http://ternovadmin.ru/

Ternovsky District (Russian: Терно́вский райо́н) is an administrative and municipal district (raion), one of the thirty-two in Voronezh Oblast, Russia. It is located in the northeast of the oblast. The area of the district is 1,391 square kilometers (537 sq mi). Its administrative center is the rural locality (a selo) of Ternovka. Population: 17,761 (2021 census); 22,125 (2010 census); 25,696 (2002 census); 29,642 (1989 Soviet census). The population of Ternovka accounts for 28.0% of the district's total population.

Within the Ternovsky district there are nature historical and cultural monuments that are protected by the state. These are the churches: Michael the Archangel (1802), Kazan (1861) and Vvedenskaya (1711), and also archaeological: Settlement (4000 BC).
