= Novokhopyorsk =

Town in Voronezh Oblast, Russia

Novokhopyorsk Новохопёрск
- Town
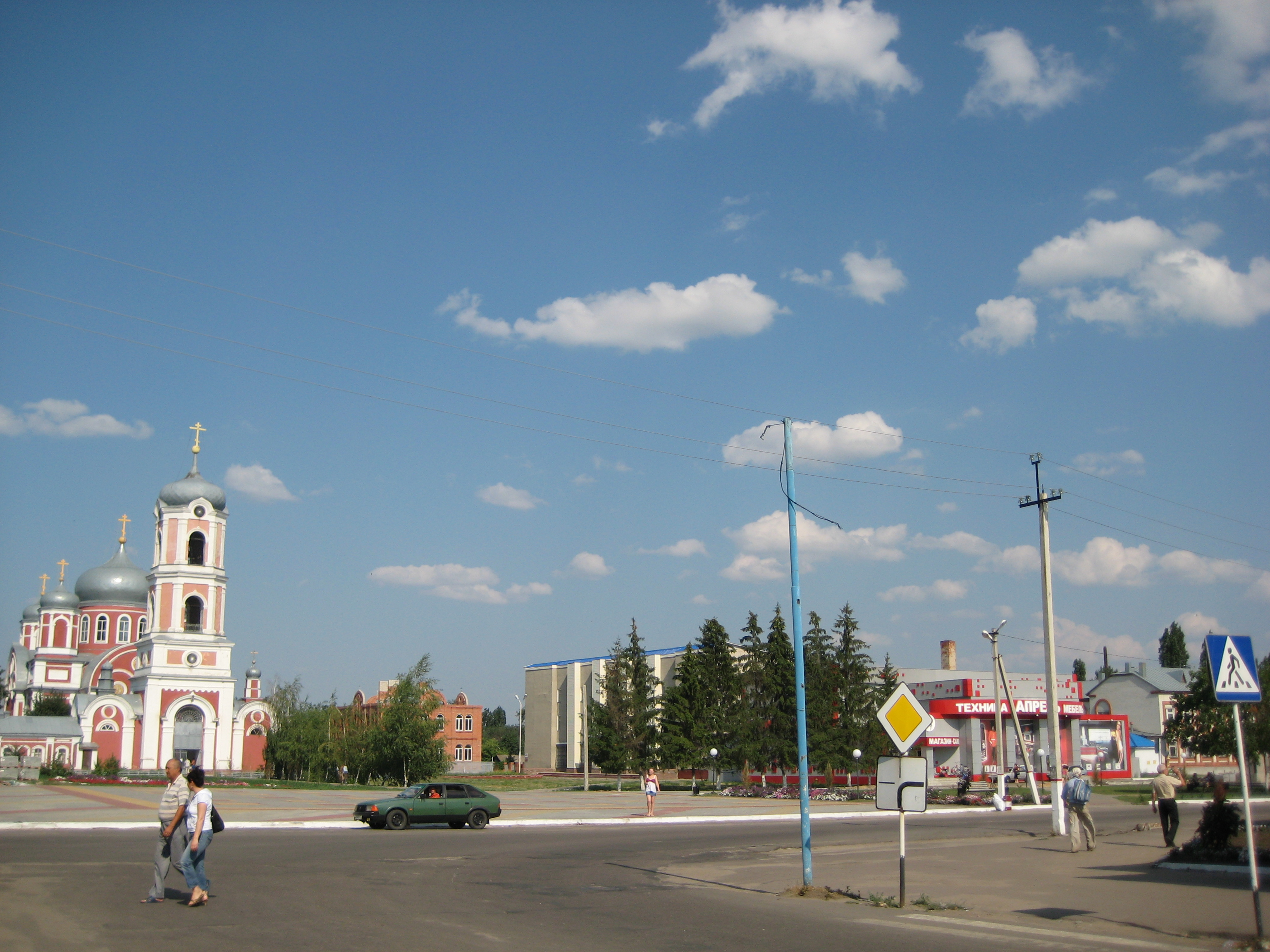
- In Novokhopyorsk

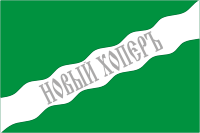
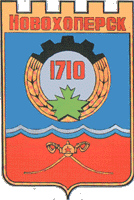
- Flag Coat of arms
- Interactive map of Novokhopyorsk
- Location of Novokhopyorsk Novokhopyorsk (Voronezh Oblast)
- Coordinates: 51°06′N 41°37′E
- Country: Russia
- Federal subject: Voronezh Oblast
- Administrative district: Novokhopyorsky District
- Urban settlementSelsoviet: Novokhopyorsk
- Founded: 1710
- Town status since: 1779
- Elevation: 140 m (460 ft)

Population (2010 Census)
  - Total: 6,849
  - Estimate (2025): 5,488 (−19.9%)

Administrative status
  - Capital of: Novokhopyorsky District, Novokhopyorsk Urban Settlement

Municipal status
  - Municipal district: Novokhopyorsky Municipal District
  - Urban settlement: Novokhopyorsk Urban Settlement
  - Capital of: Novokhopyorsky Municipal District, Novokhopyorsk Urban Settlement
- Time zone: UTC+3 (MSK)
- Postal codes: 397400, 397401, 397449
- Dialing code: +7 47353
- OKTMO ID: 20627101001

Novokhopyorsk (Russian: Новохопёрск) is a town and the administrative center of Novokhopyorsky District in Voronezh Oblast, Russia, located on the right bank of the Khopyor River, 270 kilometers (170 mi) southeast of Voronezh, the administrative center of the oblast. Population: 5,948 (2021 census); 6,849 (2010 census); 7,640 (2002 census); 8,048 (1989 Soviet census).

== History ==
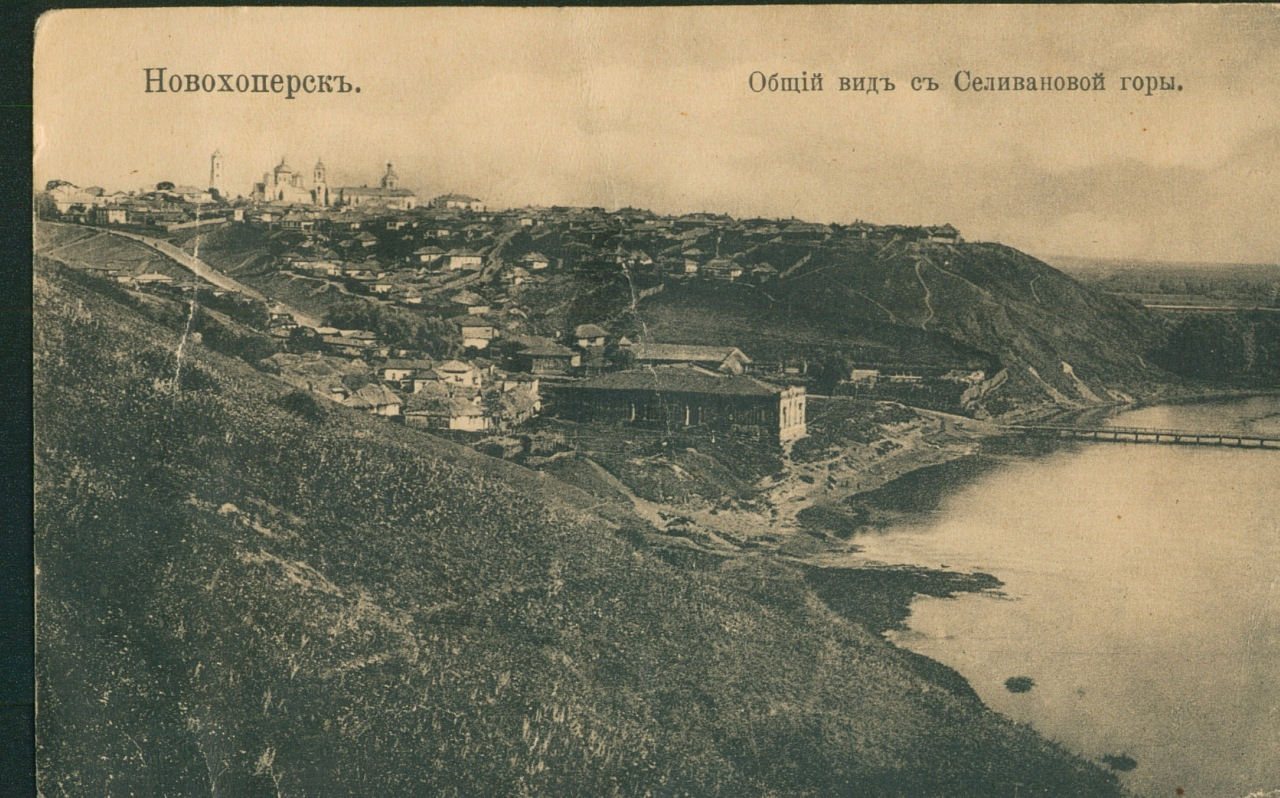
Novokhopyorsk at the end of the 19th century

It was granted town status in 1779.

== Administrative and municipal status ==
Within the framework of administrative divisions, Novokhopyorsk serves as the administrative center of Novokhopyorsky District. As an administrative division, it is, together with the work settlement of Novokhopyorsky and sixteen rural localities in Novokhopyorsky District, is incorporated within Novokhopyorsky District as Novokhopyorsk Urban Settlement. As a municipal division, this administrative unit also has urban settlement status and is a part of Novokhopyorsky Municipal District.
