= Novokhopyorsky District =

Novokhopyorsky District Новохопёрский район (Russian)
- District
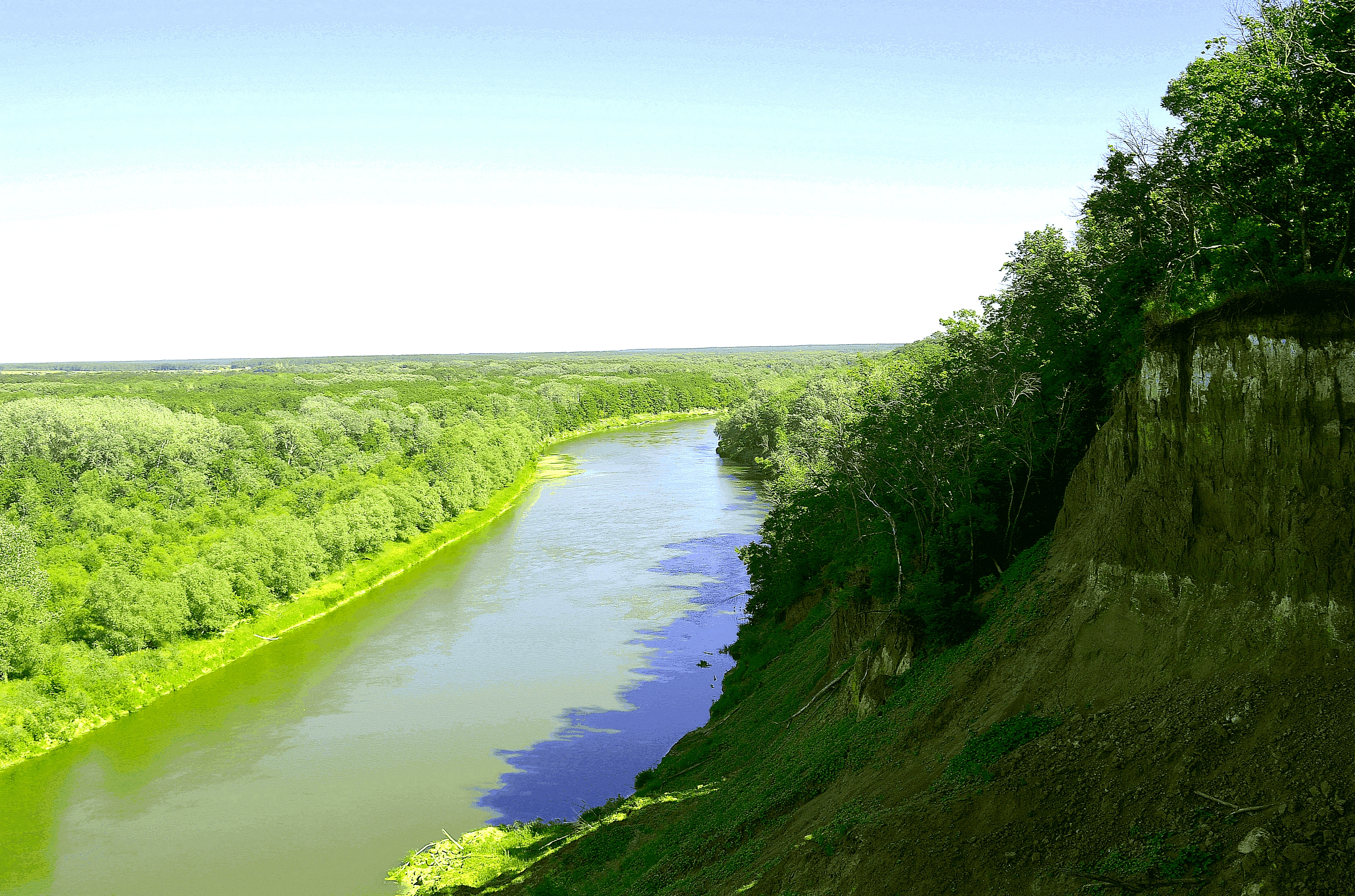
- Khopyor Nature Reserve, in Novokhopyorsky District

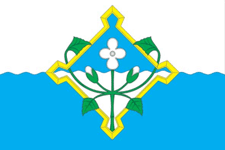
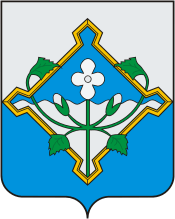
- Flag Coat of arms
- Location of Novokhopyorsky District in Voronezh Oblast
- Coordinates: 51°06′N 41°37′E
- Country: Russia
- Federal subject: Voronezh Oblast
- Established: 30 July 1928
- Administrative center: Novokhopyorsk

Area
  - Total: 2,334 km^{2} (901 sq mi)

Population (2010 Census)
  - Total: 41,128
  - Density: 17.62/km^{2} (45.64/sq mi)
  - Urban: 44.4%
  - Rural: 55.6%

Administrative structure
  - Administrative divisions: 1 Urban settlements (towns), 1 Urban settlements (urban-type settlements), 9 Rural settlements
  - Inhabited localities: 1 cities/towns, 2 urban-type settlements, 64 rural localities

Municipal structure
  - Municipally incorporated as: Novokhopyorsky Municipal District
  - Municipal divisions: 2 urban settlements, 9 rural settlements
- Time zone: UTC+3 (MSK)
- OKTMO ID: 20627000

Novokhopyorsky District (Russian: Новохопёрский райо́н) is an administrative and municipal district (raion), one of the thirty-two in Voronezh Oblast, Russia. It is located in the east of the oblast. The area of the district is 2,334 square kilometers (901 sq mi). Its administrative center is the town of Novokhopyorsk. Population: 36,148 (2021 census); 41,128 (2010 census); 45,074 (2002 census); 50,684 (1989 Soviet census). The population of Novokhopyorsk accounts for 16.5% of the district's total population.
