= Horizon Rapid =

Rapid on the Chuya River in Altai Mountains, Russia

Coordinates: 50°24′23″N 86°43′54″E

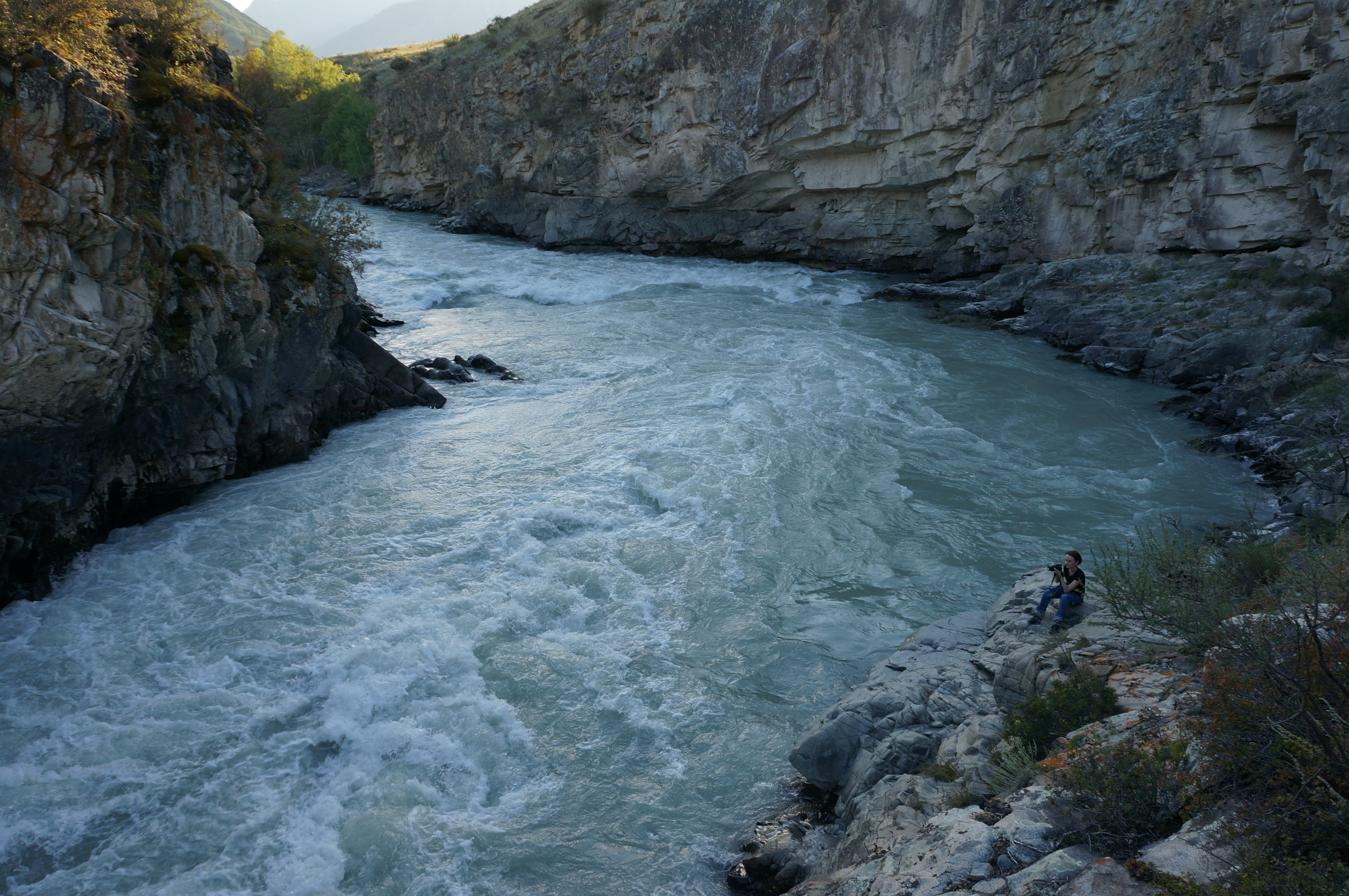
Horizon Rapid

The Horizon Rapid (or Turclub Horizon Rapid) are Class 5 rapid on the Chuya River in the Altai Mountains, Russia. Horizon Rapid is located close to the Federal Highway R256 near the 371 kilometer sign. It is located right after Turbinny Rapid in 600 meters down to the river. The total length of the rapid is about 200 meters and the drop is around 5–6 meters. It is one of the three most difficult rapids in that part of Chuya River together with Behemoth Rapid and Turbinny Rapid.
