= Turbinny Rapid =

Rapid on the Chuya River in the Altai mountains, Russia

Coordinates: 50°24′26″N 86°44′27″E

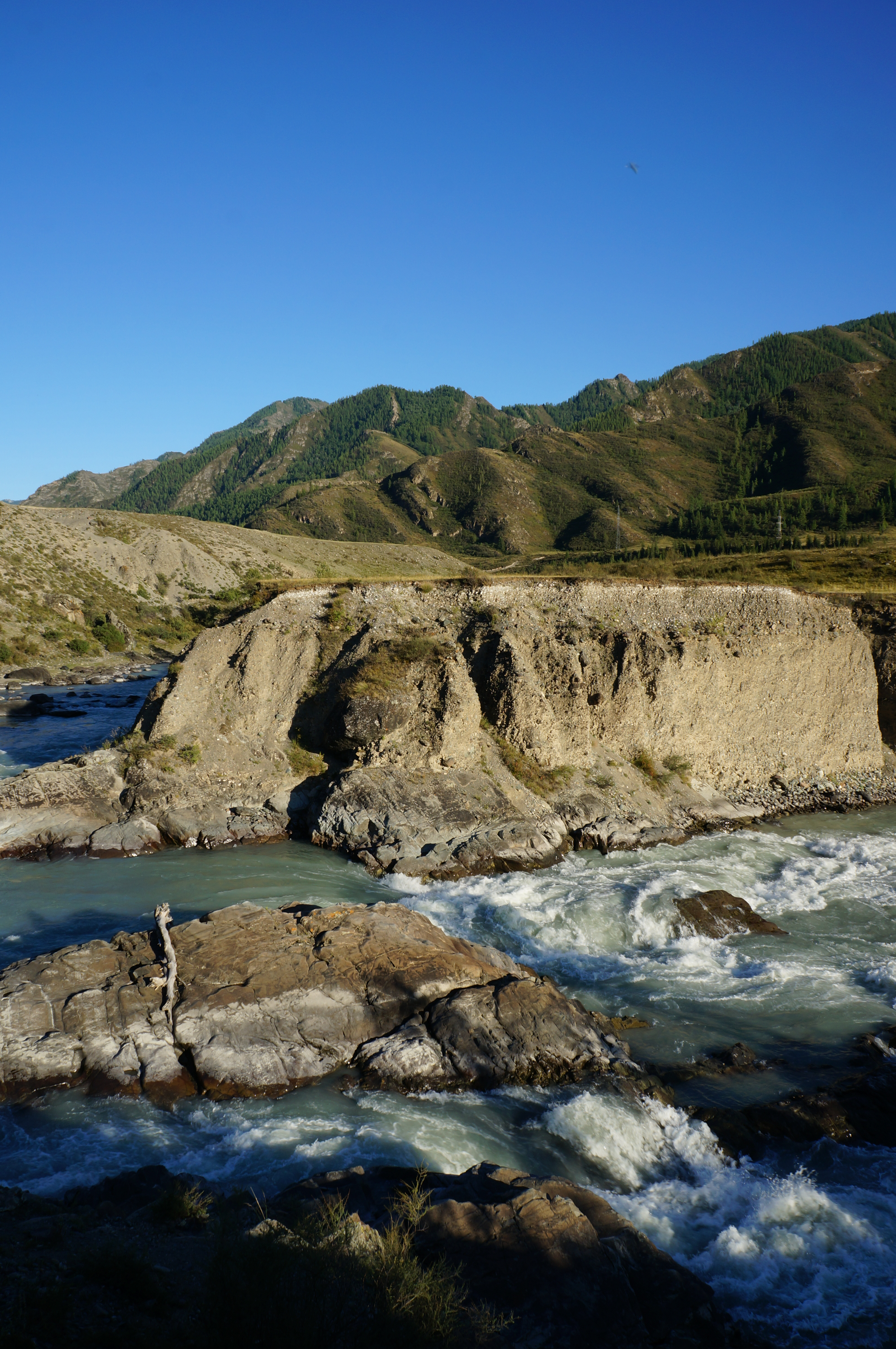
Turbinny Rapid

The Turbinny Rapid (or Turbina Rapid) are Class 4 or 5 rapid on the Chuya River in the Altai Mountains, Russia. Turbinny Rapid is located close to the Federal Highway R256 near the 371 kilometer sign. The total length of the rapid is about 25 meters and the drop is around 4 meters. It is one of the three most difficult rapids in that part of Chuya River together with Behemoth Rapid and Horizon Rapid.
