= Behemoth Rapid =

Rapid on the Chuya River in Altai Mountains, Russia

Coordinates: 50°20′54″N 87°13′43″E

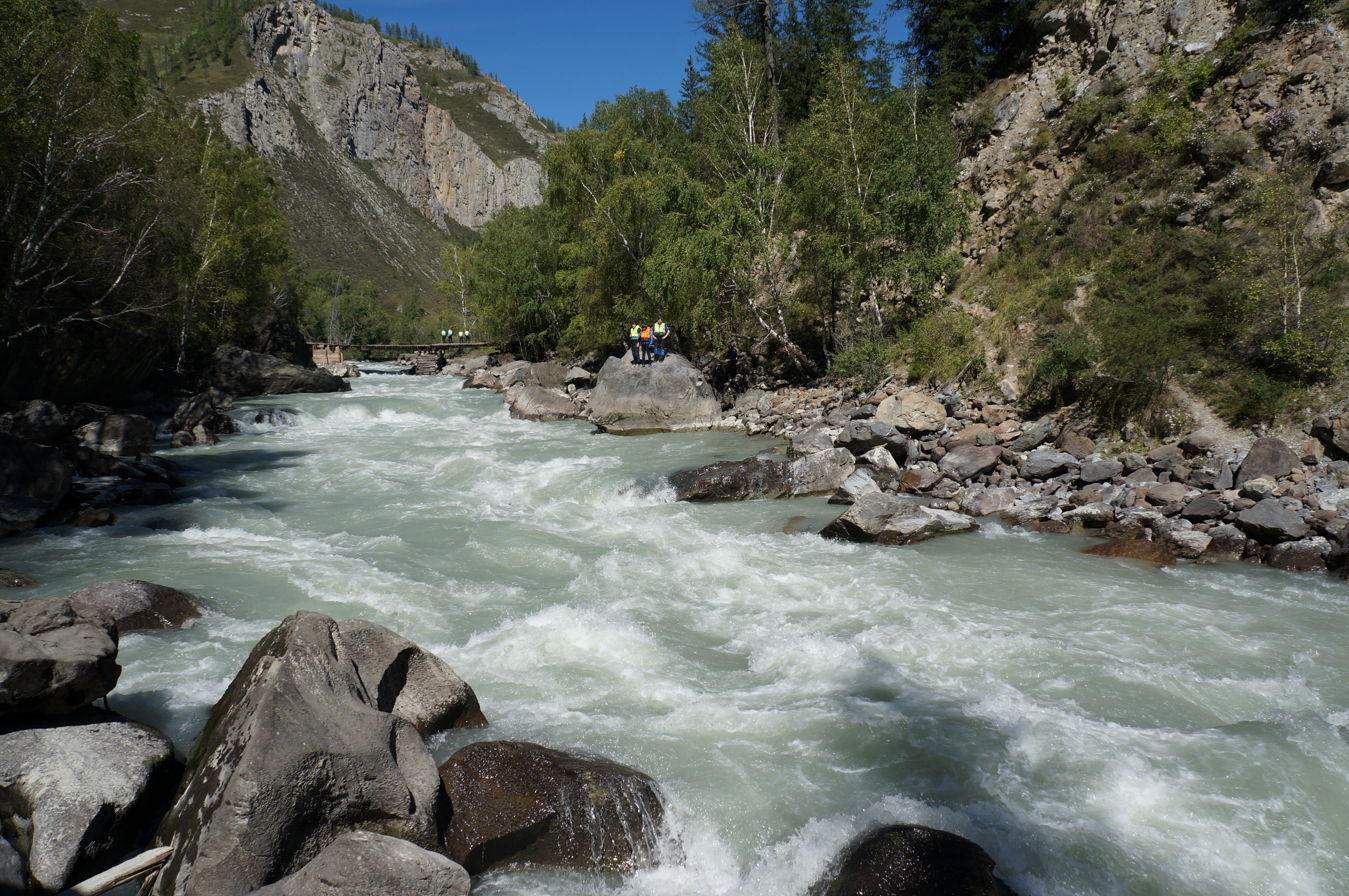
Begemoth Rapid

The Begemoth rapid are Class 5 rapids on the Chuya River in the Altai Mountains, Russia. The length of the rapid is approximately 400 meters. Begemoth Rapid is located close to the Federal Highway R256, and it is easily accessible from the road. It is one of the three most difficult rapids in that part of Chuya River, together with Turbinny Rapid and Horizon Rapid.
