= Dauria constituency =

Russian legislative constituency

Dauria single-member constituency
- Constituency of the Russian State Duma

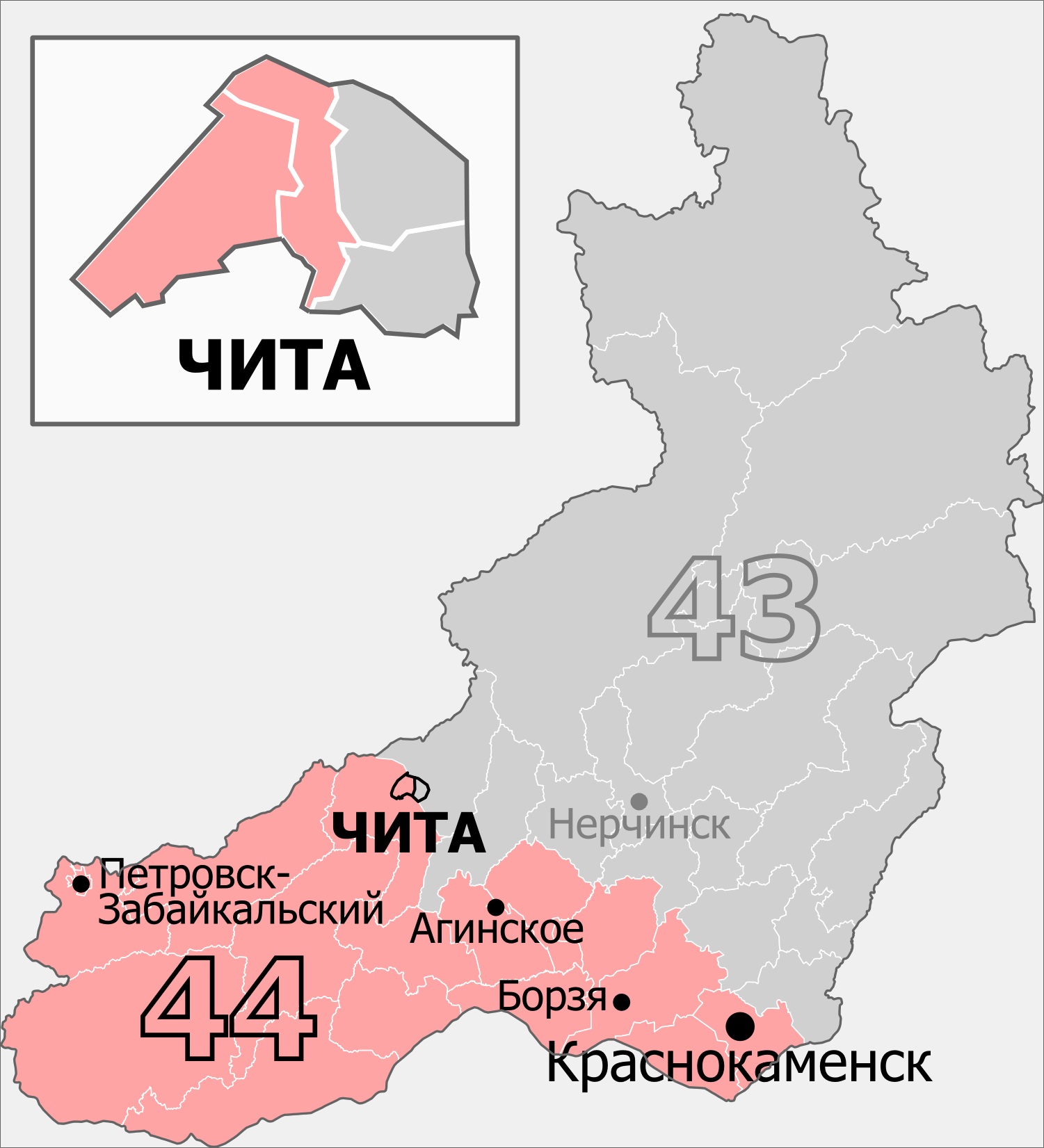
- Constituency boundaries from 2016 to 2026
- Deputy: None
- Federal subject: Zabaykalsky Krai
- Districts: Aginskoye, Aginsky, Akshinsky, Borzinsky, Chita (Chernovsky, Zheleznodorozhny), Chitinsky (Aleksandrovskoe, Arakhleyskoe, Beklemishevskoe, Domninskoe, Ingodinskoe, Kolochninskoe, Leninskoe, Lesninskoe, Novokukinskoe, Olenguyskoe, Sivyakovskoe, Sokhondinskoe, Ugdanskoe, Yablonovskoe, Yelizavetinskoe, Zasopkinskoe), Duldurginsky, Gorny, Khiloksky, Krasnochikoysky, Krasnokamensky, Kyrinsky, Mogoytuysky, Olovyanninsky, Ononsky, Petrovsk-Zabaykalsky, Petrovsk-Zabaykalsky, Ulyotovsky, Zabaykalsky
- Other territory: Abkhazia (Sukhum-1)
- Voters: 394,576 (2021)

The Dauria constituency (No.44 (Note: Borzya constituency No.187 in 1993-2007)) was a Russian legislative constituency in Zabaykalsky Krai in 1993–2007 and 2016–2026. The constituency covered western half of Chita as well as western and southern Zabaykalsky Krai. After 2025 redistricting Zabaykalsky Krai lost one of its two constituencies, so Dauria constituency was dissolved and merged with Chita constituency to form new Zabaykalye constituency.

The constituency was last represented by A Just Russia deputy Yury Grigoryev, former Member of State Assembly of the Sakha Republic and businessman, who narrowly won the four-way race against United Russia party official Yekaterina Fisun, Communist former State Duma member Dmitry Nosov and two-term Liberal Democratic incumbent Vasilina Kuliyeva in the 2021 election. Grigoryev unsuccessfully sought re-election in the Zabaykalye constituency in 2026 but was elected to the State Duma on the A Just Russia party list.

== Boundaries ==
1993–2007 Borzya constituency: Alexandrovo-Zavodsky District, Baley, Baleysky District, Borzya, Borzinsky District, Chernyshevsky District, Gazimuro-Zavodsky District, Kalgansky District, Karymsky District, Krasnokamensk, Krasnokamensky District, Mogochinsky District, Nerchinsko-Zavodsky District, Nerchinsky District, Olovyanninsky District, Ononsky District, Priargunsky District, Shelopuginsky District, Shilkinsky District, Sretensky District, Zabaykalsky District
The constituency covered southern and eastern Chita Oblast, including the towns of Baley, Borzya and Krasnokamensk.

2016–2026: Aginskoye, Aginsky District, Akshinsky District, Borzinsky District, Chita (Chernovsky, Zheleznodorozhny), Chitinsky District (Aleksandrovskoye, Arakhley, Beklemishevskoye, Domninskoye, Ingodinskoye, Kolochninskoye, Leninskoye, Lesninskoye, Novokukinskoye, Olenguyskoye, Sivyakovskoye, Sokhondinskoye, Ugdanskoye, Yablonovo, Yelizavetinskoye, Zasopkinskoye), Duldurginsky District, Gorny, Khiloksky District, Krasnochikoysky District, Krasnokamensky District, Kyrinsky District, Mogoytuysky District, Olovyanninsky District, Ononsky District, Petrovsk-Zabaykalsky, Petrovsk-Zabaykalsky District, Ulyotovsky District, Zabaykalsky District
The constituency was re-created for the 2016 election under the name of Dauria constituency in Zabaykalsky Krai which was created by the merger of Chita Oblast and Agin-Buryat Autonomous Okrug in 2008. The constituency retained southern Zabaykalsky Krai, including Borzya and Krasnokamensk, losing its eastern portion to Chita constituency. Instead it gained western Chita, western Zabaykalsky Krai from Chita constituency as well as the entirety of the dissolved Agin-Buryat constituency.

== Members elected ==
Election	Member	Party
1993	Vladimir Surenkov	Independent
1995	Viktor Kolesnikov	Agrarian Party
1999	Yaroslav Shvyryayev	Independent
2003	Yury Lossky (Note: died in June 2004)	Independent
2004	Yevgeny Blokhin	Independent
2007	Proportional representation - no election by constituency	
2011	Proportional representation - no election by constituency	
2016	Vasilina Kuliyeva	Liberal Democratic Party
2021	Yury Grigoryev	A Just Russia — For Truth

== Election results ==
=== 1993 ===
==== Declared candidates ====
- Aleksandr Epov (Independent), former Chairman of the Chita Oblast Council of People's Deputies (1991–1993)
- Nikolay Nazarov (PRES), Deputy Governor of Chita Oblast – Chairman of the Committee on Social Support
- Valery Pavlov (APR), Deputy Governor of Chita Oblast – Head of the Department of Agriculture
- Vladimir Surenkov (Independent), gold mining executive

==== Withdrawn candidates ====
- Oleg Kuznetsov (Choice of Russia), expert to the Presidential Envoy to Chita Oblast

==== Results ====
Summary of the 12 December 1993 Russian legislative election in the Borzya constituency
Candidate	Party	Votes	%
Vladimir Surenkov	Independent	56,574	26.81%
Aleksandr Epov	Independent	53,870	25.53%
Valery Pavlov	Agrarian Party	28,603	13.56%
Nikolay Nazarov	Party of Russian Unity and Accord	14,815	7.02%
against all		39,530	18.73%
Total		210,998	100%

=== 1995 ===
==== Declared candidates ====
- Ivan Chesnykh (LDPR), agriculture businessman
- Viktor Kolesnikov (APR), former Member of Chita Oblast Council of People's Deputies (1990–1993), sovkhoz director
- Valentin Logunov (Derzhava), former People's Deputy of the Soviet Union (1989–1991), former chief editor of Rossiyskaya Gazeta (1990–1993)
- Vladimir Surenkov (Independent), incumbent Member of State Duma (1994–present)
- Anatoly Varyanov (NDR), Head of the Chita Oblast Department of Employment and Labor Relations (1991–present)
- Anatoly Zaytsev (Independent), military unit commander, Russian Army lieutenant general

==== Results ====
Summary of the 17 December 1995 Russian legislative election in the Borzya constituency
Candidate	Party	Votes	%
Viktor Kolesnikov	Agrarian Party	95,835	37.82%
Anatoly Zaytsev	Independent	49,107	19.38%
Ivan Chesnykh	Liberal Democratic Party	25,945	10.24%
Vladimir Surenkov (incumbent)	Independent	23,085	9.11%
Anatoly Varyanov	Our Home – Russia	17,187	6.78%
Valentin Logunov	Derzhava	12,801	5.05%
against all		24,166	9.54%
Total		253,404	100%

=== 1999 ===
==== Declared candidates ====
- Sergey Belonogov (Independent), mining equipment plant director
- Aleksandr Epov (Independent), Deputy Chairman of the Chita Oblast Duma (1996–present), 1993 candidate for this seat
- Yevgeny Kasyanov (Independent), former Deputy Governor of Chita Oblast – Chairman of the Committee on Economy (1996–1999)
- Yury Lossky (Independent), former Member of Krasnokamensk City Council of People's Deputies (1990–1993), union leader
- Yaroslav Shvyryayev (Independent), former Member of Chita Oblast Duma (1994–1996), construction businessman, 1996 gubernatorial candidate

==== Withdrawn candidates ====
- Viktor Kolesnikov (CPRF), incumbent Member of State Duma (1996–present), 1996 gubernatorial candidate

==== Did not file ====
- Yury Likholit (Independent), manager
- Viktor Rodionov (Independent)
- Vladimir Shadapov (Independent), Member of Chita Oblast Duma (1996–present)
- Vladimir Yesheyev (Independent), 1988 Olympic bronze medalist archer

==== Results ====
Summary of the 19 December 1999 Russian legislative election in the Borzya constituency
Candidate	Party	Votes	%
Yaroslav Shvyryayev	Independent	67,569	28.95%
Yury Lossky	Independent	65,541	28.08%
Aleksandr Epov	Independent	29,000	12.42%
Sergey Belonogov	Independent	22,533	9.65%
Yevgeny Kasyanov	Independent	16,637	7.13%
against all		26,238	11.24%
Total		233,437	100%

=== 2003 ===
Results by district: Yury Lossky: 30–40% 40–50% 50–60% 60–70% 70–80%; Yaroslav Shvyryayev: 30–40% 40–50% 50–60%

==== Declared candidates ====
- Yury Lossky (Independent), Mayor of Krasnokamensk and Krasnokamensky District (2000–present), 1999 candidate for this seat (previously ran as PVR-RPZh candidate)
- Vera Shavrova (Independent), construction businessman
- Yaroslav Shvyryayev (Independent), incumbent Member of State Duma (2000–present)
- Sergey Vinnitsky (LDPR), former Member of Tomsk City Duma (1997–2001), attorney

==== Did not file ====
- Lyudmila Afanasyeva (Independent), HR manager
- Yury Likholit (Independent), manager, 1999 candidate for this seat

==== Results ====
Summary of the 7 December 2003 Russian legislative election in the Borzya constituency
Candidate	Party	Votes	%
Yury Lossky	Independent	89,255	46.51%
Yaroslav Shvyryayev (incumbent)	Independent	52,570	27.39%
Vera Shavrova	Independent	23,671	12.33%
Sergey Vinitsky	Liberal Democratic Party	5,525	2.88%
against all		17,461	9.10%
Total		191,990	100%

=== 2004 ===
==== Declared candidates ====
- Yevgeny Blokhin (Independent), Head of Shilkinsky District (1992–present)
- Viktor Kurochkin (Independent), former Member of State Duma (1996–1999), 1996 and 2000 gubernatorial candidate
- Yaroslav Shvyryayev (Independent), former Member of State Duma (2000–2003)

==== Results ====
Summary of the 24 October 2004 by-election in the Borzya constituency
Candidate	Party	Votes	%
Yevgeny Blokhin	Independent	50,363	33.33%
Viktor Kurochkin	Independent	37,330	24.70%
Yaroslav Shvyryayev	Independent	32,056	21.21%
against all		25,491	16.87%
Total		151,079	100%

=== 2016 ===
==== Declared candidates ====
- Oleg Fedorov (GP), former Member of Chita Oblast Duma (2004–2008), insurance executive
- Yury Gayduk (CPRF), aide to State Duma member Vladimir Pozdnyakov, first secretary of the party regional committee
- Vasilina Kuliyeva (LDPR), Deputy Chairwoman of the Legislative Assembly of Zabaykalsky Krai (2013–present), former Member of State Duma (2011–2012), 2013 gubernatorial candidate
- Igor Linnik (Yabloko), vocational college teacher
- Andrey Popov (A Just Russia), tourism businessman
- Aleksandr Shchebenkov (Rodina), Member of Duma of Chita (2005–2009, 2014–present), businessman
- Gennady Shchukin (Patriots of Russia), former Mayor of Petrovsk-Zabaykalsky (1996–2008)

==== Withdrawn candidates ====
- Sergey Andreyev (CPCR), perennial candidate
- Pavel Novikov (Independent), banker, chocolate factory owner

==== Failed to qualify ====
- Soyolma Balzhayeva (Independent), farmer
- Vladimir Pranitsky-Kantemir (Independent), journalist
- Yekaterina Shcherbakova (Independent), Member of Duma of Chita (2014–present)

==== Declined ====
- Aleksandr Filonich (United Russia), Member of Legislative Assembly of Zabaykalsky Krai (2013–present) (lost the primary)
- Viktor Svyatetsky (United Russia), Atomredmetzoloto executive director (won the primary, ran on the party list)

==== Results ====
Summary of the 18 September 2016 Russian legislative election in the Dauria constituency
Candidate	Party	Votes	%
Vasilina Kuliyeva	Liberal Democratic Party	71,831	44.13%
Yury Gayduk	Communist Party	27,213	16.72%
Andrey Popov	A Just Russia	20,295	12.47%
Oleg Fedorov	Civic Platform	12,466	7.66%
Aleksandr Shchebenkov	Rodina	7,169	4.40%
Gennady Shchukin	Patriots of Russia	6,728	4.13%
Igor Linnik	Yabloko	3,663	2.25%
Total		162,776	100%

=== 2021 ===
Results by district: Yury Grigoryev: 20–30% 30–40% 50–60%; Yekaterina Fisun: 20–30% 30–40% 40–50%; Dmitry Nosov: 20–30%; Aleksandr Sinkevich: 20–30%

==== Declared candidates ====
- Yekaterina Fisun (United Russia), chairwoman of the party regional executive committee
- Yury Grigoryev (SR–ZP), Member of State Assembly of the Sakha Republic (2013–present), businessman
- Vasilina Kuliyeva (LDPR), incumbent Member of State Duma (2011–2012, 2016–present)
- Aleksandr Mikhaylov (RPPSS), Member of Legislative Assembly of Zabaykalsky Krai (2008–2013, 2018–present)
- Dmitry Nosov (CPRF), former Member of State Duma (2011–2016)
- Aleksandr Sinkevich (Rodina), Head of Ulyotovsky District (2018–present)

==== Withdrawn candidates ====
- Aleksandr Zakondyrin (Greens), former chairman of the Green Alliance party (2015–2019), 2018 Moscow mayoral candidate

==== Did not file ====
- Aleksandr Dedyukhin (New People), 2019 Universiade Champion biathlete

==== Declined ====
- Yelena Titova (CPRF), Member of Chitinsky District Council (2018–present) (ran in the Chita constituency)
- Andrey Gurulyov (United Russia), Deputy Chairman of the Government of Zabaykalsky Krai (2019–present) (ran on the party list)

==== Results ====
Summary of the 17-19 September 2021 Russian legislative election in the Dauria constituency
Candidate	Party	Votes	%
Yury Grigoryev	A Just Russia — For Truth	36,617	24.26%
Yekaterina Fisun	United Russia	32,290	21.39%
Dmitry Nosov	Communist Party	31,308	20.74%
Vasilina Kuliyeva (incumbent)	Liberal Democratic Party	23,475	15.55%
Aleksandr Mikhaylov	Party of Pensioners	12,103	8.02%
Aleksandr Sinkevich	Rodina	5,464	3.62%
Total		150,924	100%
