= Agin-Buryat constituency =

Russian legislative constituency

Agin-Buryat single-member constituency
- Constituency of the Russian State Duma

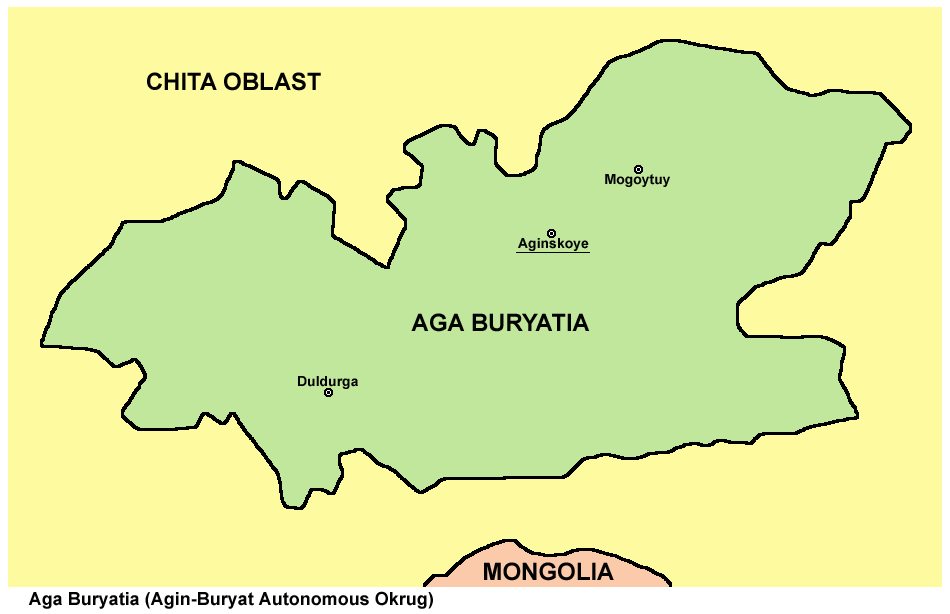
- Constituency boundaries from 1993 to 2007
- Deputy: None
- Federal subject: Agin-Buryat Autonomous Okrug
- Districts: Aginskoye, Aginsky, Duldurginsky, Mogoytuysky
- Voters: 45,151 (2003)

The Agin-Buryat constituency (No.215) was a Russian legislative constituency in Agin-Buryat Autonomous Okrug in 1993–2007. It encompassed the entire territory of Agin-Buryat Autonomous Okrug. The seat was last occupied by United Russia faction member Iosif Kobzon, a famous estrada singer, who won a by-election in 1997.

The constituency was dissolved in 2007 when State Duma adopted full proportional representation for the next two electoral cycles. In 2008 Agin-Buryat Autonomous Okrug was merged with Chita Oblast to form Zabaykalsky Krai. Currently the territory of the former Agin-Buryat constituency is part of the Dauria constituency.

== Boundaries ==
1993–2007: Aginskoye, Aginsky District, Duldurginsky District, Mogoytuysky District
The constituency had been covering the entirety of Agin-Buryat Autonomous Okrug since its initial creation in 1993.

== Members elected ==
Election	Member	Party
1993	Bair Zhamsuyev (Note: elected as Head of Administration of Agin-Buryat Autonomous Okrug in February 1997)	Independent
1995	Bair Zhamsuyev	Independent
1997	Iosif Kobzon	Independent
1999	Iosif Kobzon	Independent
2003	Iosif Kobzon	Independent

== Election results ==
=== 1993 ===
==== Declared candidates ====
- Tsyrendorzhi Damdinov (Independent), former First Deputy Chairman of the Amur Oblast Committee for the Management of State Property (1993)
- Tsyren Nimbuyev (Independent), former People's Deputy of the Soviet Union (1989–1991)
- Bair Zhamsuyev (Independent), Deputy Head of Administration of Agin-Buryat Autonomous Okrug – Permanent Representative to the Government of Russia (1990–present)

==== Withdrawn candidates ====
- Ochir Damdinov (Independent), postgraduate student

==== Results ====
Summary of the 12 December 1993 Russian legislative election in the Agin-Buryat constituency
Candidate	Party	Votes	%
Bair Zhamsuyev	Independent	13,867	48.97%
Tsyren Nimbuyev	Independent	6,443	22.75%
Tsyrendorzhi Damdinov	Independent	3,714	13.12%
against all		2,251	7.95%
Total		28,318	100%

=== 1995 ===
==== Declared candidates ====
- Tatyana Fomenko (Independent), poultry farm director
- Maria Rozhkova (Independent), engineer
- Erdem Tsybikzhapov (Independent), former People's Deputy of Russia (1990–1993)
- Bair Tushemilov (Independent), businessman
- Bair Zhamsuyev (Independent), incumbent Member of State Duma (1994–present), Chairman of the Duma Committee on Nationalities (1994–present)

==== Results ====
Summary of the 17 December 1995 Russian legislative election in the Agin-Buryat constituency
Candidate	Party	Votes	%
Bair Zhamsuyev (incumbent)	Independent	11,770	37.63%
Bair Tushemilov	Independent	11,377	36.38%
Tatyana Fomenko	Independent	4,680	14.96%
Maria Rozhkova	Independent	1,840	5.88%
Erdem Tsybikzhapov	Independent	188	0.60%
against all		934	2.99%
Total		31,275	100%

=== 1997 ===
==== Declared candidates ====
- Vladimir Chimitdorzhin (Independent), college lecturer, 1997 gubernatorial candidate
- Yevgeny Grishin (Independent)
- Iosif Kobzon (Independent), former People's Deputy of the Soviet Union (1989–1991), estrada singer
- Aleksandr Morozov (Independent), crime boss, convicted felon
- Boris Rabdano (Independent), journalist
- Bator Zhigzhitzhapov (Independent), former First Deputy Head of Administration of Agin-Buryat Autonomous Okrug

==== Results ====
Summary of the 17 September 1997 by-election in the Agin-Buryat constituency
Candidate	Party	Votes	%
Iosif Kobzon	Independent	19,187	86.77%
Vladimir Chimitdorzhin	Independent	637	2.88%
Vladimir Grishin	Independent	569	2.57%
Bator Zhigzhitzhapov	Independent	486	2.20%
Boris Rabdano	Independent	276	1.25%
Aleksandr Morozov	Independent	95	0.43%
against all		405	1.83%
Total		22,112	100%

=== 1999 ===
==== Declared candidates ====
- Tsyrendorzhi Damdinov (Yabloko), Member of Agin-Buryat Okrug Duma (1994–present), 1993 candidate for this seat
- Iosif Kobzon (Independent), incumbent Member of State Duma (1997–present)
- Valery Sodboyev (Independent), wrestling coach

==== Results ====
Summary of the 19 December 1999 Russian legislative election in the Agin-Buryat constituency
Candidate	Party	Votes	%
Iosif Kobzon (incumbent)	Independent	28,298	91.21%
Tsyrendorzhi Damdinov	Yabloko	970	3.13%
Valery Sodboyev	Independent	854	2.75%
Total		31,026	100%

=== 2003 ===
==== Declared candidates ====
- Tsyrendorzhi Damdinov (Yabloko), Member of Agin-Buryat Okrug Duma (1994–present), 1993 and 1999 candidate for this seat
- Bair Dorzhiyev (Independent), Mayor of Aginskoye (2000–present)
- Aleksandr Ivanov (Independent), realtor
- Iosif Kobzon (Independent), incumbent Member of State Duma (1997–present)
- Lubsan Sukhodayev (LDPR), journalist
- Dorzho Tumunbayarov (CPRF), Member of Chita Oblast Duma (1996–present)

==== Results ====
Summary of the 7 December 2003 Russian legislative election in the Agin-Buryat constituency
Candidate	Party	Votes	%
Iosif Kobzon (incumbent)	Independent	25,537	82.12%
Bair Dorzhiyev	Independent	3,053	9.82%
Tsyrendorzhi Damdinov	Yabloko	718	2.31%
Dorzho Tumunbayarov	Communist Party	580	1.87%
Lubsan Sukhodayev	Liberal Democratic Party	286	0.92%
Aleksandr Ivanov	Independent	240	0.77%
against all		366	1.18%
Total		31,100	100%
