= Flag of Zabaykalsky Krai =

Flag of the Russian krai of Zabaykalsky

Zabaykalsky Krai
- Proportion: 2:3
- Adopted: 11 February 2009
- Design: Horizontal bicolour of green and red charged with a yellow triangle based at the hoist
- Designed by: L. V. Kulesh and V. I. Kulesh

The flag of Zabaykalsky Krai, along with the coat of arms, is the official symbol of Zabaykalsky Krai, a federal subject of Russia.

The law adopting the flag and the coat of arms of the krai were adopted by the Legislative Assembly on 11 February 2009 and signed into law by the Governor on 17 February 2009. The flag became official on 1 March 2010. On the same day at 10:00 AM, the flag was hoisted on the building of the krai government. The flag was raised and lowered at least five times to enable the journalists present to take quality photographs.

Visually, the flag is unchanged from the flag of Chita Oblast, a predecessor of Zabaykalsky Krai. It is a horizontal green and red bi-colour charged with a yellow triangle at the hoist side, where yellow symbolizes the endless steppes, prosperity, and justice; green symbolizes the taiga and the rich fauna of the krai, as well as hope, joy, and prosperity; and red symbolizes the energy-rich natural resources, bravery, and fearlessness.

== Other flags ==
Flag	Date	Use	Description
	?–present	Flag of Chita	
	1 March 2008–present	Flag of the Agin-Buryat Okrug	
	6 July 2001–1 March 2008	Flag of the Agin-Buryat Autonomous Okrug	
	1996–6 July 2001	Flag of the Agin-Buryat Autonomous Okrug	
	?–present	Flag of Aginsky District	
	?–present	Flag of Aginskoye	
	?–present	Flag of Alexandrovo-Zavodsky District	
	?–present	Flag of Borzinsky District	
	?–present	Flag of Gazimuro-Zavodsky District	
	?–present	Flag of Kalarsky District	
	?–present	Flag of Krasnokamensky District	
	?–present	Flag of Krasnochikoysky District	
	?–present	Flag of Nerchinsky District	
	?–present	Flag of Nerchinsko-Zavodsky District	
	?–present	Flag of Ononsky District	
	?–present	Flag of Sretensky District	
	?–present	Flag of Tungiro-Olyokminsky District	
	?–present	Flag of Ulyotovsky District	
	?–present	Flag of Chernyshevsky District	
	?–present	Flag of Chitinsky District	
	?–present	Flag of Shelopuginsky District	
	?–present	Flag of Shilkinsky District	
