= Bato-Zhargal Zhambalnimbuyev =

Russian politician

- Бато-Жаргал Жамбалнимбуев
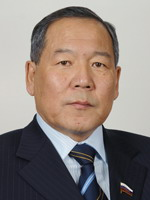

Auditor of the Accounts Chamber of Russia
- In office 25 September 2013 – 23 November 2018
- Preceded by: Mikhail Odintsov
- Succeeded by: Svetlana Orlova

Russian Federation Senator from Zabaykalsky Krai
- In office 15 December 2010 – 17 September 2013
- Succeeded by: Bair Zhamsuyev

Russian Federation Senator from the Agin-Buryat Autonomous Okrug
- In office 28 February 2001 – 15 December 2010
- Preceded by: Dashi Dugarov

Personal details
- Born: 5 August 1948 (age 78) Aginskoye, ABAO, Chita Oblast, RSFSR, Soviet Union
- Education: Tomsk Polytechnic Institute

Bato-Zhargal Zhambalnimbuyev (Russian: Бато-Жаргал Жамбалнимбуев; born 5 August 1948), is a Russian politician. He served as Auditor of the Accounts Chamber of Russia from 2013 to 2018.

He was previously a member of the Federation Council, a representative of the executive body of state power of Zabaykalsky Krai from 2010 to 2013. He also served as the representative of the legislative authority of Agin-Buryat Autonomous Okrug from 2001 to 2010.

== Early life ==
Bato-Zhargal Zhambalnimbuyev was born on 5 August 1948 in Aginskoye, Agin-Buryat Autonomous Okrug.

In 1966, he worked at the Oryol GOK as an electrician. In 1973, he graduated from the S. M. Kirov Tomsk Polytechnic Institute, where he worked until 1981. At the institute he was first an assistant, then a senior lecturer. From 1981 to 1991 he worked at the Chita Polytechnic Institute, where he was a senior teacher, associate professor, and later head of department.

Zhambalnimbuyev has a PhD in technical sciences and held the title of associate professor.

== Career ==
On 14 March 2001, Zhambalnimbuyev became a Senator in the Federation Council, representing the legislative authority of Agin-Buryat Autonomous Okrug in the interests of the Agin-Buryat Autonomous Okrug Duma.

In 2004 he became a member of the Federation Council delegation to the NATO Parliamentary Assembly.

On 23 November 2005, Zhambalnimbuyev's powers in the Federation Council were reaffirmed. Council roles:

- Federation Council Committee on Economic Policy
- International Affairs Committee
- Commission for Monitoring the Operations of the Federation Council
- Commission on Natural Monopolies
- Chairman of the Subcommittee on the Development of the Oil and Gas Industry, Pipeline Transport and Terminals
- Committee on Natural Resources and Environmental Protection
- Deputy Chairman of the Federation Council Commission for Control over the Activities of the Federation Council
- Federation Council Committee on Budget and Financial Markets.

On 15 December 2010, Zhambalnimbuyev's powers were confirmed for the third time, as a Member of the Federation Council serving as representative from the executive authority of Zabaykalsky Krai.

At the 112th Assembly of the Inter-Parliamentary Union in Manila, Philippines, he was elected vice-president of the Standing Committee on Peace and Security. At the 124th Assembly in Panama, he was elected vice-president of the Standing Committee on Sustainable Development, Finance and Trade.

On 25 September 2013, at the proposal of Vladimir Putin, Zhambalnimbuyev was appointed by the Federation Council as an auditor of the Accounts Chamber of Russia. He was a member of the Government Commission on the agro-industrial complex and sustainable development of rural areas, a member of the Commission of the Government of Russia on the development of the fishery complex, and a member of the council for forestry development.

On 23 November 2018, the Federation Council dismissed Zhambalnimbuyev from the position of auditor.
