= Bolot Ayushiyev =

Russian politician (born 1949)

- Болот Аюшиев
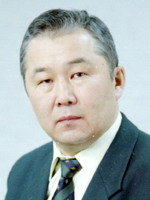

2nd Head of Administration of Agin-Buryat Autonomous Okrug
- In office 13 January 1996 – 6 February 1997
- Preceded by: Gurodarma Tsedashiyev
- Succeeded by: Bair Zhamsuyev

Personal details
- Born: Bolot Vandanovich Ayushiyev; 19 June 1949 (age 77) Urda-Aga, Aginsky District, Agin-Buryat-Mongol National Okrug, Chita Oblast, Russian SFSR, Soviet Union
- Party: United Russia

Bolot Vandanovich Ayushiyev (Russian: Болот Ванданович Аюшиев; born 19 June 1949), is a Russian politician who had served as the second Governor (Head) of Agin-Buryat Autonomous Okrug.

== Biography ==
Bolot Ayushiyev was born on 19 June 1949 in the village of Urda-Aga, Aginsky Buryat Autonomous Okrug. He graduated from the Kuibyshev Planning Institute in 1972, and the Academy of Social Sciences under the Central Committee of the CPSU in 1990.

He worked as a senior economist and chairman of the planning commission of the Aginsky Buryat regional executive committee, head of the financial department of the Duldurginsky and Aginsky regional executive committees.

From 1982 to 1985, he was the Deputy Chairman of the Aginsky District Executive Committee. From 1985 to 1988, he was the Chairman of the Mogoytuysky District Executive Committee. From 1988 to 1990, he was the head of the financial department of the Aginsky Buryat regional executive committee.

Between 1990 and 1993, Ayushiyev was a people's deputy of the Russian Federation, and a member of the Council of Nationalities of the Supreme Soviet, Commission on budget, plans, taxes and prices, Constitutional Commission. He was part of the Sovereignty and Equality faction.

In April 1990, he was elected chairman of the Aginsky Buryat District Council of People's Deputies; in 1993 he was elected a deputy of the Federation Council of the first convocation, and was a member of the Committee on Budget, Tax Policy, Financial, Currency and Customs Regulation, Banking.

On 13 January 1996, Ayushiyev was appointed governor (head) of the Agin-Buryat Autonomous Okrug. In October 1996, he ran for the election of the head of the district administration, but the elections were declared invalid, since no candidate received 50% of the votes. On 6 February 1997, he was removed from office two weeks before the re-election of the head of the district administration.

He advocated providing all autonomous entities with economic independence. He associated economic development with the solution of social problems, the provision of guarantees for the protection of veterans, pensioners, large families. He paid considerable attention to the problems of the agro-industrial complex. He considered it necessary to write off farmer's debts and to provide them with support for the introduction of advanced production technologies, processing and storage of products.

In 1997, he had been the Deputy Head of the Chita Regional Administration, as the Chairman of the Finance Committee, until 2008.

== Family ==
He is married and has two daughters.
