= Baldan Tsydypov =

Russian military officer (born 1998)

- Балдан Цыдыпов

Deputy to the State Duma
- Incumbent
- Assumed office 29 September 2026

Personal details
- Born: 14 May 1998 (age 28) Aginskoye, Russia
- Party: United Russia
- Education: Novosibirsk Higher Military Command School
- Awards: Hero of the Russian Federation; Order of Courage

Military service
- Branch/service: Russian Armed Forces
- Rank: Senior lieutenant
- Commands: 5th Separate Guards Tank Tatsinskaya Brigade
- Battles/wars: Russian invasion of Ukraine

Baldan Bairovich Tsydypov (Russian: Балдан Баирович Цыдыпов; born 14 May 1998 in Aginskoye, Aginsky District, Agin-Buryat Autonomous Okrug, Russia) is a Russian officer (Senior Lieutenant) and commander of a motorized rifle platoon in the 5th Separate Guards Tank Tatsinskaya Brigade. He is a participant in the Russian invasion of Ukraine and a Hero of the Russian Federation (2022).

== Biography ==
He was born in the settlement of Aginskoye, Agin-Buryat Autonomous Okrug.

In 2016, he enrolled in the Novosibirsk Higher Military Command School, graduating in 2020. He served in units of the Eastern Military District in Ussuriysk and Ulan-Ude.

In 2022, he participated in the Russian invasion of Ukraine as a motorized rifle platoon commander within the 5th Separate Guards Tank Tatsinskaya Brigade.

On 11 June 2022 he was named a Hero of the Russian Federation. The Hero of the Russian Federation medal was presented by Defense Minister Sergei Shoigu, who offered Tsydypov a position as a senior specialist-expert at a military commissariat in Moscow.

For the 2026 parliamentary election, he was placed third in regional group No. 1 (comprising the Republic of Buryatia, the Republic of Sakha (Yakutia), Zabaykalsky Krai, Kamchatka Krai, Primorsky Krai, Khabarovsk Krai, Amur Oblast, Magadan Oblast, Sakhalin Oblast, the Jewish Autonomous Oblast, and Chukotka Autonomous Okrug) of the federal list of candidates nominated by the United Russia party and became a member of the 9th State Duma.
