= Bair Zhamsuyev =

Russian politician

- Баир Жамсуев
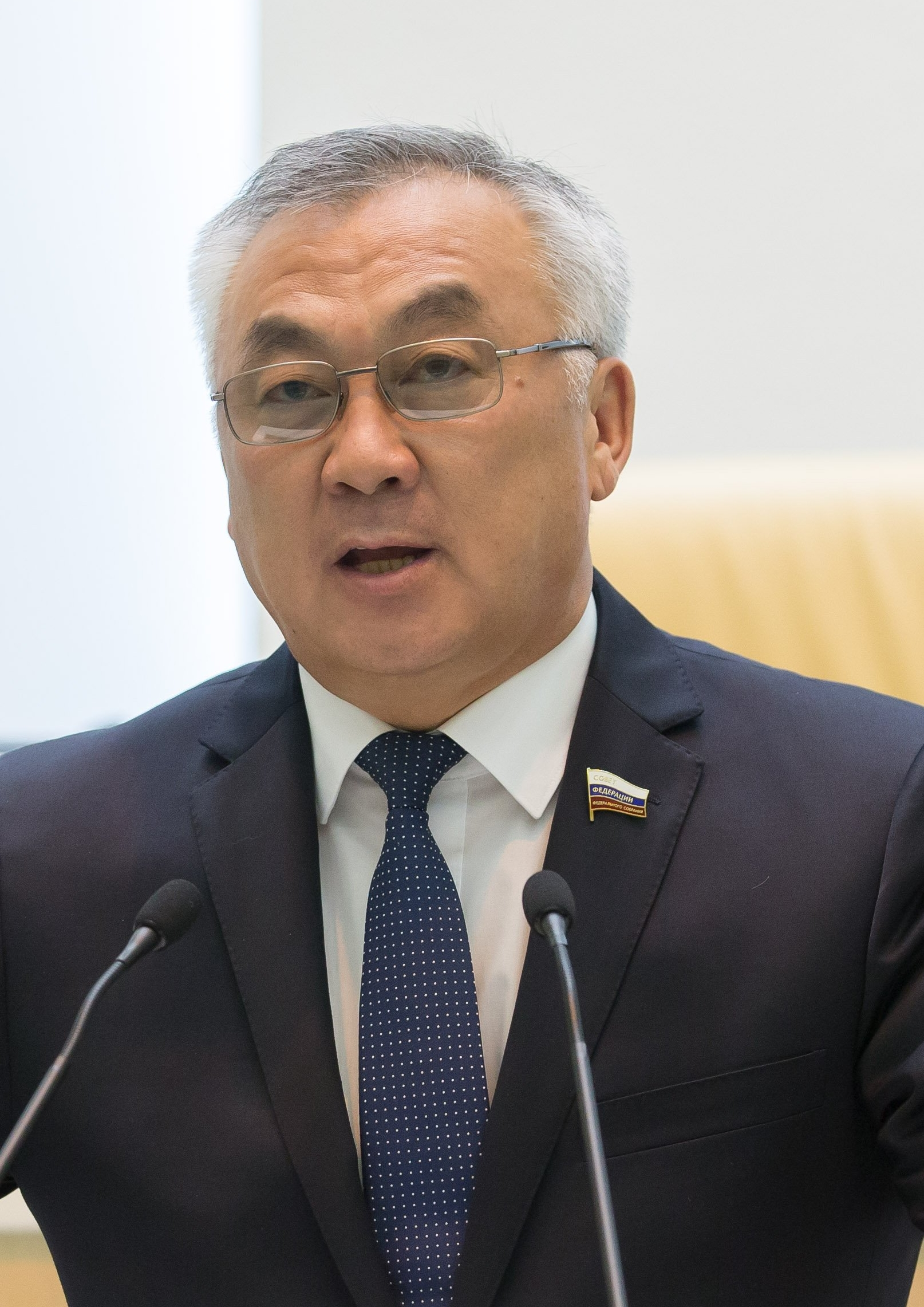
- Zhamsuyev in 2016

Russian Federation Senator from Zabaykalsky Krai
- Incumbent
- Assumed office 13 September 2013
- Preceded by: Bato-Zhargal Zhambalnimbuyev

3rd Head of Administration of Agin-Buryat Autonomous Okrug
- In office 5 March 1997 – 1 March 2008
- Preceded by: Bolot Ayushiyev
- Succeeded by: position abolished

Member of the State Duma
- In office December 1993 – February 1997
- Succeeded by: Iosif Kobzon
- Constituency: Agin-Buryat

Personal details
- Born: Bair Bayakhaslanovich Zhamsuyev; 29 January 1959 (age 67) Aginskoye, Russia, Soviet Union
- Party: United Russia

Bair Bayaskhalanovich Zhamsuyev (Russian: Баир Баясхаланович Жамсуев; born 29 January 1959) is a Russian statesman, who is currently the Senator of Zabaykalsky Krai. a representative from the executive body of state power of the federal subject with powers as a deputy chairman within the Federation Council Committee on International Affairs. Zhamsuyev was the 3rd and last Governor (Head) of Agin-Buryat Autonomous Okrug, as he served from 1997 to 2008. He was the Member of the State Council of Russia from 2001 to 2008. He was also the Member of the Presidium of the State Council of the Russia from 2006 to 2007. He was ranked colonel. He was awarded Active State Councilor of the Russian Federation, 3rd Class.

== Biography ==
Bair Zhamsuyev was born on 29 January 1959 in the village of Aginskoye, Chita Region (now in Zabaykalsky Krai).

In 1980, he graduated from the Chita State Pedagogical Institute of N.G. Chernyshevsky, majoring in "history and social studies teacher," and completed his military training alongside his studies. After graduating, he worked as a history and social science teacher at Ulan-Odon secondary school in the village of Ortuy, Mogoytuy district, Chita region, until 1981. From October 1981 to December 1985, he served as an instructor and later became the deputy head of the department of sports and mass defense work at the Chita Regional Committee of the Komsomol. Following that, from December 1985 to September 1986, he held the position of Second Secretary of the Aginsky Buryat Okrug Committee of the Komsomol. In September 1986 to October 1988, he was promoted to the position of First Secretary of the Aginsky Buryat Okrug Committee of the Komsomol.

From October 1988 to October 1990, he was elected as Second Secretary of the Chita Regional Committee of the Komsomol. Subsequently, from October 1990 to July 1991, he served as Second Secretary of the Aginsky Buryat District Committee of the CPSU, also through an alternative election process. From July 1991 to December 1993, Zhamsuyev held the position of the permanent representative of the Agin-Buryat Autonomous Okrug in the Russian Government.

From October 1988 October 1990, he was Second Secretary of the Chita Regional Committee of the Komsomol by being elected on an alternative basis. From October 1990 to July 1991, he was Second Secretary of the Aginsky Buryat District Committee of the CPSU, also by being elected on an alternative basis and from July 1991 to December 1993, Zhamsuyev was the permanent representative of the Agin-Buryat Autonomous Okrug of the Russian Government.

In 1993, he graduated from the Russian Academy of Management in Moscow with a degree in jurisprudence, qualification "lawyer, expert - adviser on public administration".

Between December 1993 to February 1997, Zhamsuyev was a member of the State Duma the first convocation. As a member of parliament, he was the Chairman of the State Duma Committee on Nationalities. Since January 1994, he was a member of the New Regional Policy deputy group within the State Duma. From December 1995 to February 1997, he was the member of the State Duma of the second convocation. He was demoted during that time to Deputy Chairman of the State Duma Committee on Nationalities. Zhamsuyev was the Chairman of the Commission of the State Duma for assistance in overcoming the consequences of the Ossetian-Ingush conflict. In February 1997, Zhamsuyev was elected Governor (Head) of Agin-Buryat Autonomous Okrug. In 1999, by the decision of the Dissertation Council of the Russian Academy of Public Administration under the President of Russia, Zhamsuyev was awarded the academic degree "Candidate of Political Sciences".

From 1997 to February 2001, as governor, Zhamsuyev was a member of the Federation Council, and was a member of the Committee on Federation Affairs, the Federal Treaty and Regional Policy. On 29 October 2000, he was re-elected to this position, gaining almost 90% of the votes of voters participating in the voting.

On 7 September 2005, Russian President Vladimir Putin submitted Zhamsuyev's candidacy, which would to be given the powers of the Governor as the head of the administration. On 15 September 2005, Zhamsuyev was approved by the Agin-Buryat Autonomous Okrug Duma. Between 2001 and 2008, he member of the State Council of the Russian Federation. Between 29 2006 to March 16, 2007, he was member of the Presidium of the State Council of the Russian Federation. On 1 March 2008, the powers were terminated after the unification of the Agin-Buryat Autonomous Okrug and the Chita Oblast into the Zabaykalsky Krai, and Governor of Chita Oblast, Ravil Geniatulin, was sworn in office as the first governor the same day. After the merge, Zhamsuyev had made a significant contribution to the socio-economic development of the Aginsky-Buryat Autonomous Okrug, created an innovative management model in the region, which ensured the investment attractiveness of the production sphere, the social orientation of the market economy, effective interaction with social and religious structures, the all-round flourishing of the spiritual and moral culture of the Agin people.

From March 2008 to February 2010, Zhamsuyev was the assistant to the Chief of Staff of the Presidential Administration of the Russia, and member of the Advisory Commission of the State Council of Russia. From February 20 to August 2013, he was the Chief Federal Inspector for the Zabaykalsky Krai within the Office of the Plenipotentiary Representative in the Siberian Federal District. He was also the Head of the Reception Office of the President of Russia in the Zabaykalsky, and the representative of the President of the Russian Federation in the Qualification Collegium of Judges of the Zabaykalsky Krai. Zhamsuyev has been representing the Krasnoyarsk Krai as Senator in the Federation Council since 19 September 2013.

On 19 September 2019, the Governor of Zabaykalsky Krai, Aleksander Osipov, extended the powers of Zhamsuyev in the Federation Council, and on 25 December 2019, he was appointed Deputy Chairman of the Federation Council Committee on International Affairs, with Konstantin Kosachev. He previously served as deputy chairman of the Federation Council Committee on Defense and Security. He is currently the Deputy Chairman of the Council for the Development of the Far East and the Baikal Region under the Federation Council.

=== Sanctions ===
He was sanctioned by Canada under the Special Economic Measures Act (S.C. 1992, c. 17) in relation to the Russian invasion of Ukraine for Grave Breach of International Peace and Security, and by the UK government on 15 March 2022 in relation to Russo-Ukrainian War.
