= Aginsky =

Aginsky (masculine), Aginskaya (feminine), or Aginskoye (neuter) may refer to:

- Aginsky District, a district of Agin-Buryat Okrug of Zabaykalsky Krai, Russia
- Aginskoye, Zabaykalsky Krai, an urban locality (an urban-type settlement) in Zabaykalsky Krai, Russia
  - Aginskoye Urban Okrug, a municipal formation of Zabaykalsky Krai which this urban-type settlement is municipally incorporated as
- Aginskoye, Krasnoyarsk Krai, a rural locality (a selo) in Sayansky District of Krasnoyarsk Krai, Russia
