= Khoyto-Aga =

Khoyto-Aga Хойто-Ага
- Selo
- Location within Zabaykalsky Krai Location within Russia
- Coordinates: 51°05′N 114°05′E
- Country: Russia
- Region: Zabaykalsky Krai
- District: Aginsky District
- Time zone: UTC+9:00

Khoyto-Aga (Russian: Хойто-Ага) is a rural locality (a selo) in Aginsky District, Zabaykalsky Krai, Russia. Population: 713 (2021 census); 834 (2010 census); 849 (2002 census); There are 11 streets in this selo.

== Geography ==
This rural locality is located 32 km from Aginskoye (the district's administrative centre), 112 km from Chita (capital of Zabaykalsky Krai) and 5,365 km from Moscow. Yuzhny Argaley is the nearest rural locality.
