= Budulan =

Budulan Будулан
- Selo
- Location within Zabaykalsky Krai Location within Russia
- Coordinates: 50°33′N 114°55′E
- Country: Russia
- Region: Zabaykalsky Krai
- District: Aginsky District
- Time zone: UTC+9:00

Budulan (Russian: Будулан) is a rural locality (a selo) in Aginsky District, Zabaykalsky Krai, Russia. Population: 665 (2021 census); 890 (2010 census); 890 (2002 census); There are 12 streets in this selo.

== Geography ==
This rural locality is located 66 km from Aginskoye (the district's administrative centre), 192 km from Chita (capital of Zabaykalsky Krai) and 5,491 km from Moscow. Kubukhai is the nearest rural locality.
