= Tsokto-Khangil =

Tsokto-Khangil Цокто-Хангил
- Selo
- Location within Zabaykalsky Krai Location within Russia
- Coordinates: 50°54′N 114°37′E
- Country: Russia
- Region: Zabaykalsky Krai
- District: Aginsky District
- Time zone: UTC+9:00

Tsokto-Khangil (Russian: Цокто-Хангил) is a rural locality (a selo) in Aginsky District, Zabaykalsky Krai, Russia. Population: 821 (2021 census); 1,296 (2010 census); 1,423 (2002 census); There are 18 streets in this selo.

== Geography ==
This rural locality is located 23 km from Aginskoye (the district's administrative centre), 148 km from Chita (capital of Zabaykalsky Krai) and 5,427 km from Moscow. Suduntuy is the nearest rural locality.
