= Gurodarma Tsedashiyev =

Russian politician

- Гуродарма Цэдашиев

1st Head of Administration of Agin-Buryat Autonomous Okrug
- In office 26 December 1991 – 13 January 1996
- Succeeded by: Bolot Ayushiyev

Chairman of the Executive Committee of the Agin-Buryat District Council
- In office 1990–1991

Personal details
- Born: 5 November 1948; Kunkur, Aginsky District, ABNO, Chita Oblast, RSFSR, Soviet Union
- Died: 2015 (aged 66–67)

Gurodarma Tsedashiyevich Tsedashiyev (Russian: Гуродарма Цэдашиевич Цэдашиев; 5 November 1948 – 2015) was a Russian politician who had served as the 1st Head of the Administration of the Agin-Buryat Autonomous Okrug from 1991 to 1996.

== Biography ==
Gurodarma Tsedashiyev was born on 5 November 1948. He was the eldest of eleven children in his family.

He was a municipal figure, honored worker of physical culture of the Republic of Buryatia. In 1967, he worked as a physical education teacher at the Budalan secondary school. From 1968 to 1970, he served in the Soviet Army. In 1974, he graduated from the Faculty of Physical Education of the Buryat Pedagogical Institute.

Until 1981, he was the director of the Aginsky District Children's and Youth Sports School. In 1983, he was elected chairman of the Aginskoye town council of people's deputies. He worked as head of the cinema department of the Aginsky regional executive committee, deputy chairman of the Aginsky regional executive committee, chairman of the regional consumer cooperation.

In 1990, he was the Chairman of the Aginsky Okrug Executive Committee.

On 26 December 1991, Tsedashiyev became the Head of the Administration of the Agin-Buryat Autonomous Okrug. At the same time, he was elected as a deputy of the Aginsky village, district, and district Councils of People's Deputies. He was the deputy of the Chita Oblast Duma of the 1st convocation from 1994 to 1996, and was a member of the Standing Committee on Legislative Proposals. He left office on 13 January 1996.

In 1997–2012, he was a Deputy Manager of the Aginsky Department of Social Insurance. He died in 2015.
