= Suduntuy =

Suduntuy Судунтуй
- Selo
- Location within Zabaykalsky Krai Location within Russia
- Coordinates: 50°45′N 114°27′E
- Country: Russia
- Region: Zabaykalsky Krai
- District: Aginsky District
- Time zone: UTC+9:00

Suduntuy (Russian: Судунтуй) is a rural locality (a selo) in Aginsky District, Zabaykalsky Krai, Russia. Population: 917 (2021 census); 1,238 (2010 census); 1,340 (2002 census); There are 17 streets in this selo.

== Geography ==
This rural locality is located 39 km from Aginskoye (the district's administrative centre), 157 km from Chita (capital of Zabaykalsky Krai) and 5,434 km from Moscow. Tsokto-Khangil is the nearest rural locality.
