= Kunkur, Zabaykalsky Krai =

Kunkur Кункур
- Selo
- Location within Zabaykalsky Krai Location within Russia
- Coordinates: 50°34′N 115°10′E
- Country: Russia
- Region: Zabaykalsky Krai
- District: Aginsky District
- Time zone: UTC+9:00

Kunkur (Russian: Кункур) is a rural locality (a selo) in Aginsky District, Zabaykalsky Krai, Russia. Population: 821 (2021 census); 1,052 (2010 census); 1,011 (2002 census); There are 9 streets in this selo.

== Geography ==
This rural locality is located 73 km from Aginskoye (the district's administrative centre), 200 km from Chita (capital of Zabaykalsky Krai) and 5,506 km from Moscow. Nizhny Tsasuchey is the nearest rural locality.
