= Urda-Aga =

Urda-Aga Урда-Ага
- Selo
- Location within Zabaykalsky Krai Location within Russia
- Coordinates: 50°24′N 114°10′E
- Country: Russia
- Region: Zabaykalsky Krai
- District: Aginsky District
- Time zone: UTC+9:00

Urda-Aga (Russian: Урда-Ага) is a rural locality (a selo) in Aginsky District, Zabaykalsky Krai, Russia. Population: 806 (2021 census); 1,121 (2010 census); 953 (2002 census); There are 25 streets in this selo.

== Geography ==
This rural locality is located 21 km from Aginskoye (the district's administrative centre), 127 km from Chita (capital of Zabaykalsky Krai) and 5,391 km from Moscow. Yuzhny Argaley is the nearest rural locality.
