= Flag of Chita Oblast =

Flag of the Russian oblast of Chita

Chita Oblast
- Proportion: 2:3
- Adopted: 22 December 1995
- Design: Horizontal bicolour of green and red with a yellow triangle based at the hoist (party per pall)
- Designed by: L. V. Kulesh and V. I. Kulesh

The flag of Chita Oblast, a former federal subject of the Russian Federation, was a horizontal green and red bicolour with a yellow triangle at the hoist side. It was adopted on December 22, 1995.

The flag is the same as that of Zabaykalsky Krai, which was formed when Chita Oblast and Agin-Buryat Autonomous Okrug merged on March 1, 2008.
