= Vasilina Kuliyeva =

Russian politician (born 1981)

Vasilina Kuliyeva MP
- Василина Кулиева
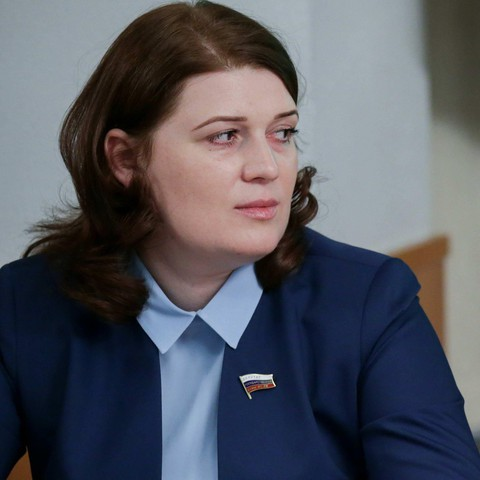

Member of the State Duma (Party List Seat)
- In office 22 November 2023 – 29 March 2026
- Preceded by: Vasily Vlasov
- Succeeded by: Maria Kharchenko
- In office 21 December 2011 – 17 December 2012
- Succeeded by: Aleksandr Smirnov

Member of the State Duma for Zabaykalsky Krai
- In office 5 October 2016 – 12 October 2021
- Preceded by: constituency re-established
- Succeeded by: Yury Grigoriev
- Constituency: Dauria (No. 44)

Personal details
- Born: 20 November 1981 (age 44) Chita, Chita Oblast, Russian SFSR, Soviet Union
- Party: Liberal Democratic Party of Russia
- Children: 1 daughter

Vasilina Vasilyevna Kuliyeva (née Zakharchenko, Russian: Василина Васильевна Кулиева, born 20 November 1981) is a Russian politician of the Liberal Democratic Party, who has been a member of the State Duma between 2011 and 2012, 2016 and 2021, and again since 2023.

== Biography ==
In 2004, she graduated from the N. G. Chernyshevsky Transbaikal Pedagogical University, with a degree in jurisprudence. From 2005 to 2008 she worked in the Chita branch of Spasskie Vorota insurance group as a lawyer, in parallel, she was the deputy coordinator of the Chita regional branch of the Liberal Democratic Party of Russia.

From 2008 to 2011, she worked as an employee of the Governor's staff of Zabaykalsky Krai, at the same time was an assistant to the member of the 5th State Duma from LDPR. In 2009, she came second in the mayoral election in Chita. In December 2011 she was elected as a member of the 6th State Duma on the list of the Liberal Democratic Party, entering the committee on family, women and children and Commission on parliamentary ethics. She resigned as deputy on 17 December 2012 to run for 2013 gubernatorial elections. As LDPR candidate for the Governor of Zabaykalsky Krai she took third place with 10% of the vote. In the elections to the 7th State Duma, she ran for the Liberal Democrats in Dauria constituency No. 44, and was elected on 18 September 2016.

In the elections to the 8th State Duma Kulieva was running in the same Dauria constituency, but unlike the previous campaign ruling United Russia party also decided to nominate the candidate for this seat. As a result, Kuliyeva came only 4th in the race, after Yury Grigoryev from SRZP, Yekaterina Fisun from United Russia and Communist Dmitry Nosov.

From September to November 2023, she served as a deputy of the 4th convocation of the Legislative Assembly of Zabaykalsky Krai, representing the Liberal Democratic Party of Russia (LDPR). She resigned from her position on 9 November 2023.

On 22 November 2023, she received a mandate as a deputy of the 8th convocation of the State Duma of the Federal Assembly of the Russian Federation, following the departure of Vasily Vlasov from parliament.

On 19 December 2023, she was appointed to the Supreme Council of the LDPR.

== See also ==
- Results of the 2016 Russian legislative election by constituency
- List of members of the 7th Russian State Duma
