= Yuzhny Argaley =

Yuzhny Argaley Южный Аргалей
- Selo
- Location within Zabaykalsky Krai Location within Russia
- Coordinates: 51°08′N 114°15′E
- Country: Russia
- Region: Zabaykalsky Krai
- District: Aginsky District
- Time zone: UTC+10:00

Yuzhny Argaley (Russian: Южный Аргалей) is a rural locality (a selo) in Aginsky District, Zabaykalsky Krai, Russia. Population: 676 (2021 census); 791 (2010 census); 728 (2002 census); There are 23 streets in this selo.

== Geography ==
This rural locality is located 20 km from Aginskoye (the district's administrative centre), 112 km from Chita (capital of Zabaykalsky Krai) and 5,371 km from Moscow. Khoyto-Aga is the nearest rural locality.
