= Yury Grigoriev =

Russian politician

- Юрий Григорьев
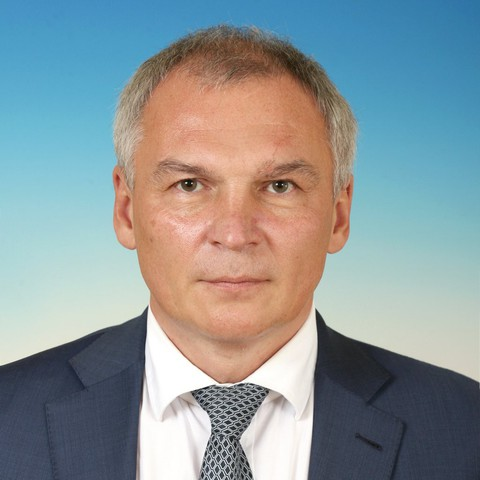
- official portrait, circa 2021

Member of the State Duma for Zabaykalsky Krai
- Incumbent
- Assumed office 12 October 2021
- Preceded by: Vasilina Kuliyeva
- Constituency: Dauria (No. 44)

Personal details
- Born: 20 September 1969 (age 57) Yakutsk, Yakut ASSR, Russian SFSR, USSR
- Party: A Just Russia — For Truth
- Education: North-Eastern Federal University

Yury Innokentievich Grigoriev (Russian: Юрий Иннокентьевич Григорьев; born September 20, 1969, in Yakutsk) is a Russian political figure and a deputy of the 8th State Dumas.

In 1987, Grigoriev started working as a laboratory assistant in the physics cabinet of a secondary school in Yakutsk. From 1988 to 1989, he served at the Soviet Army. From 1993 to 2013, he headed the industrial enterprise Agroteks LLC. In April 2014, he became the president of the Yakut regional public foundation to promote the education and the formation of patriotism and love for the native land "Russian North". From 2013 to 2021, he was the deputy of the State Assembly of the Sakha Republic of the 5th and 6th convocations. Since September 2021, he has served as deputy of the 8th State Duma.
