= Aleksandr Aleksandrovich Smirnov =

Russian politician (1958–2021)

- Александр Смирнов
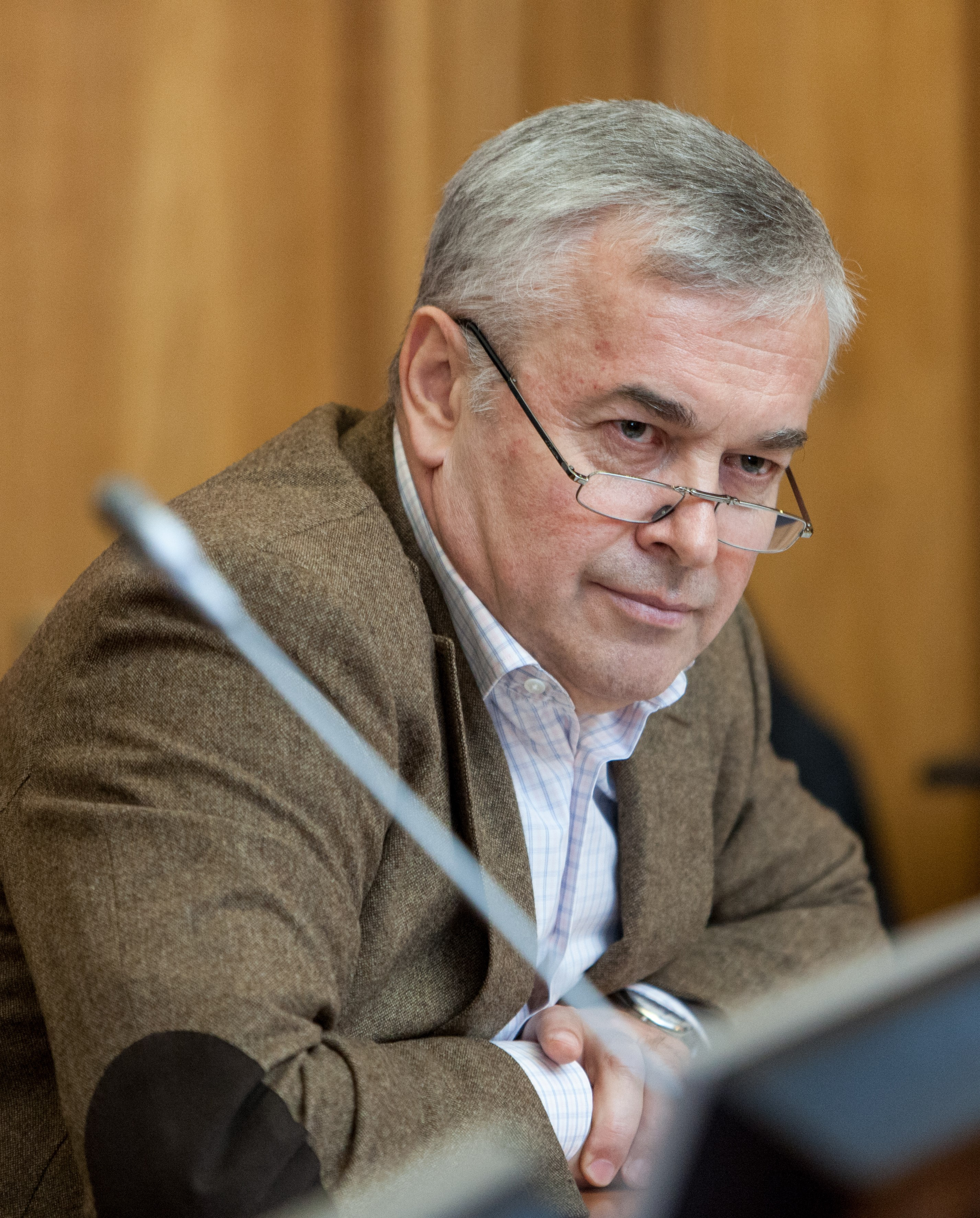

Member of the State Duma for Zabaykalsky Krai
- In office 2012–2016

Personal details
- Born: 19 October 1958 (age 67) Kokand, Uzbek SSR
- Died: Kislovodsk, Russia
- Party: LDPR

Aleksandr Aleksandrovich Smirnov (Russian: Александр Александрович Смирнов; 26 April 1958 – 21 July 2021) was a Russian politician. From 2012 to 2016, Smirnov was a member of the 6th convocation of the State Duma, having previously been a vice-governor of Saint Petersburg. He received the mandate of Vasilina Kuliyeva, after she resigned from the Duma to run for Governor of Zabaykalsky Krai in the 2013 Zabaykalsky Krai gubernatorial election. He was a member of the Liberal Democratic Party of Russia.

One of Smirnov's assistants reported that he had died aged 63 in Kislovodsk on 21 July 2021, after having contracted COVID-19.

== List of Submitted Draft Laws (Bill Numbers and Titles) ==
- 999761-6: On Amendments to Article 222 of Part One of the Civil Code of the Russian Federation (clarification of rules on unauthorized construction)
- 812244-6: On Amendments to Article 37 of the Federal Law "On Automobile Roads and Road Activities in the Russian Federation..." (on coordinating routes for alternative free passage of vehicles with road owners)
- 826280-6: On Amendments to Article 36 of the Federal Law "On Automobile Roads..." (prohibition of paid use of road sections built to bypass populated areas)
- 218991-6: On Amendments to Certain Legislative Acts of the Russian Federation Regarding State Regulation of Passenger and Luggage Transport by Road upon Request
- 937952-6: On Amendments to the Tax Code of the Russian Federation Regarding the Abolition of the Transport Tax
- 387369-6: On Amendments to the Housing Code of the Russian Federation and Other Legislative Acts (definition of the concept of the social norm of utility consumption)
- 654649-6: On Amendments to Article 179 of the Housing Code of the Russian Federation
- 986339-6, 298242-6: On Amendments to the Housing Code of the Russian Federation
- 981174-6: On Amendments to the Budget Code of the Russian Federation
- 405690-6: On Amendments to the Federal Law "On the Electric Power Industry" and Article 27 of the Federal Law "On Energy Saving..." (removal of provisions allowing authorities to introduce social norms for energy consumption)
- 849447-6: On Amendments to Articles 31 and 31.1 of the Federal Law "On Automobile Roads..." (regulation of the movement of vehicles transporting weapons and military equipment)
- 538404-6: On Amendments to Certain Legislative Acts (ban on providing hotel services in residential premises of apartment buildings)
- 382627-6: On Amendments to Article 182 of the Housing Code (engagement of contractors for capital repairs on a competitive basis)
- 357434-6: On Amendments to Article 180 of the Housing Code (ban on entrepreneurial activities by regional operators)
- 285514-6: On Amendments to the Housing Code (expansion of eligible parties for special account ownership and authorized banks)
- 255154-6: On Amendments to Article 14 of the Law on the Housing and Utilities Reform Fund (extension of deadlines for passing regulations on capital repairs)
- 357311-6: On Amendments to Article 157 of the Housing Code
- 276612-6: On Amendments to Article 11.23 of the Administrative Offenses Code
- 295017-6: On Amendments to Article 17.1 of the Administrative Offenses Code and Article 287 of the Criminal Code
- 283023-6: On Amendments to the Federal Law on the Housing and Utilities Reform Fund
