= List of federal subjects of Russia by total fertility rate =

This is a list of values of total fertility rates by federal subjects of Russia.

== TFR by federal subjects ==
=== 2020-2025 ===
Source: Суммарный коэффициент рождаемости

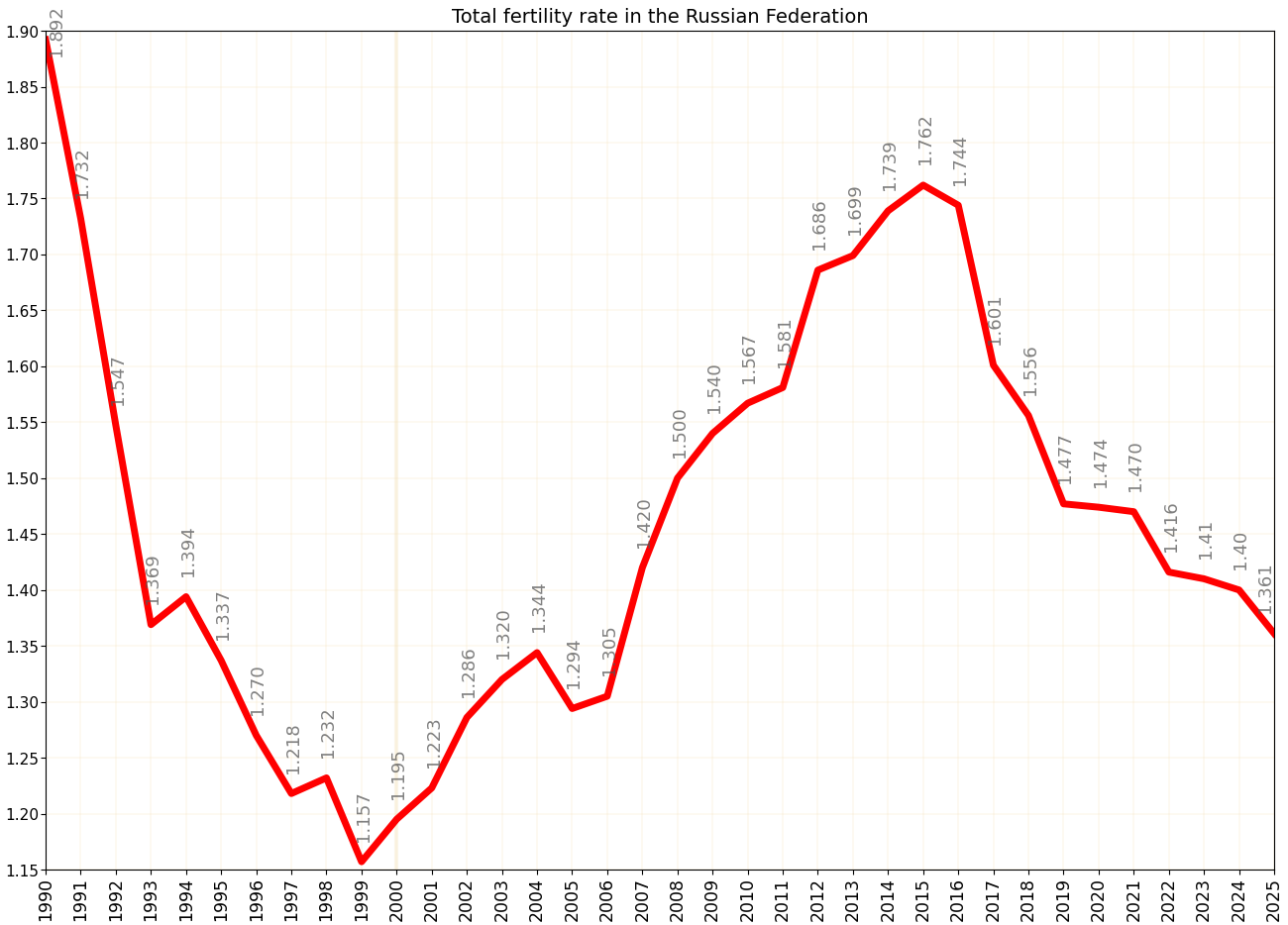
Total fertility rate in Russia, 1990—2025

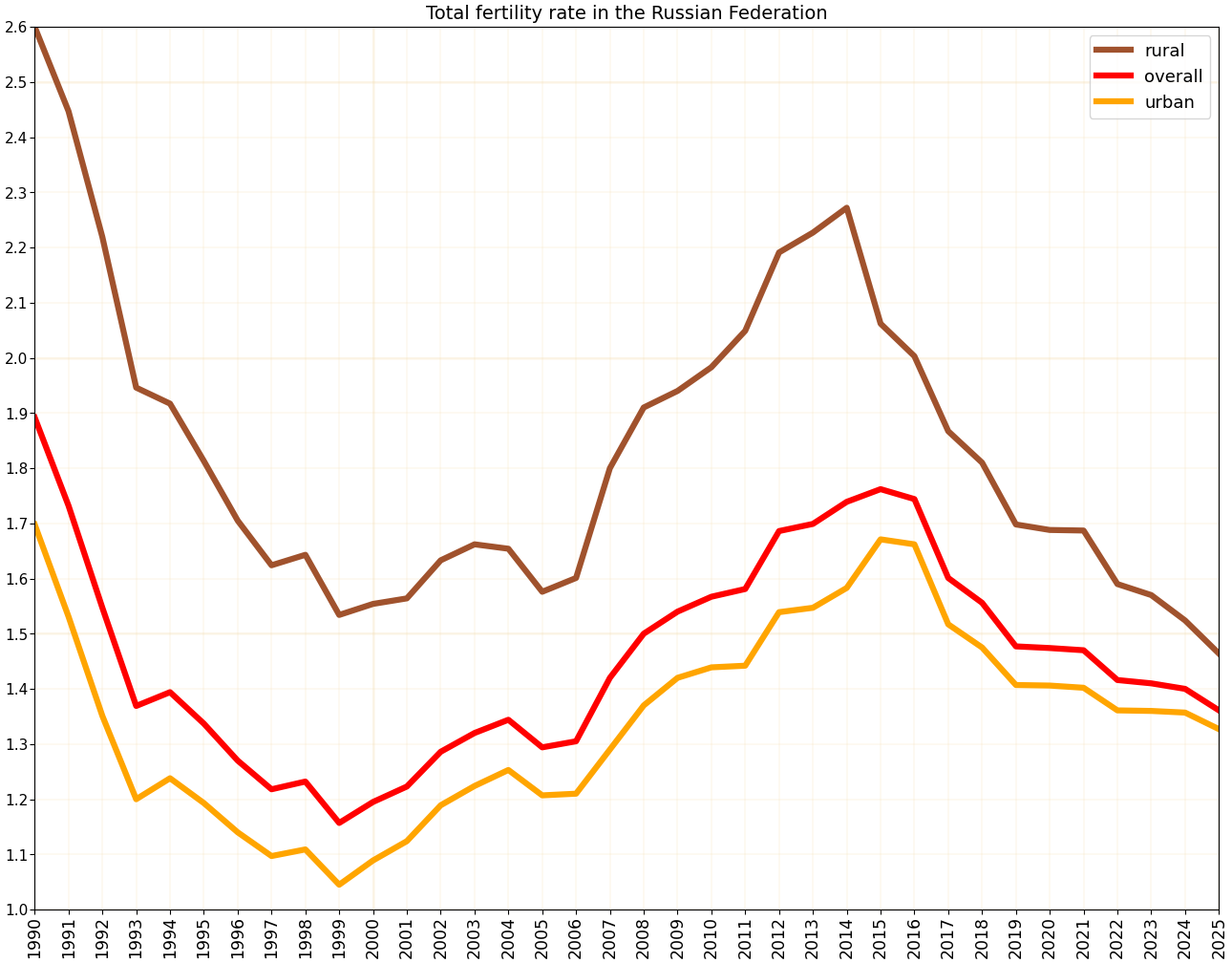
Splitting for rural and urban

Federal subject	2020	2021	2022	2023	2024	2025
Russian Federation	1.50	1.50	1.42	1.41	1.40	1.37
Chechnya	2.57	2.50	2.74	2.66	2.71	2.60
Tuva	2.97	2.94	2.51	2.44	2.31	2.21
Yamalo Nenets A.O.	1.90	1.89	1.92	1.95	1.92	2.01
Altai Republic	2.09	2.08	2.07	2.03	1.87	1.78
Ingushetia	1.85	1.87	1.83	1.81	1.84	1.75
Dagestan	1.87	1.76	1.73	1.75	1.82	1.79
Tyumen Oblast	1.77	1.78	1.72	1.72	1.76	1.73
Sakhalin Oblast	1.97	1.94	1.81	1.74	1.73	1.69
Chukotka	1.76	1.66	1.66	1.68	1.69	1.72
Nenets Autonomous Okrug	2.26	2.07	1.84	1.91	1.66	1.62
Khanty–Mansi A.O. (Yugra)	1.78	1.74	1.67	1.66	1.65	1.57
Astrakhan Oblast	1.73	1.74	1.63	1.64	1.62	1.60
Irkutsk Oblast	1.70	1.69	1.69	1.65	1.62	1.60
Kabardino-Balkaria	1.64	1.67	1.51	1.53	1.61	1.58
North Ossetia–Alania	1.72	1.71	1.59	1.52	1.61	1.55
Zabaykalsky Krai	1.75	1.74	1.69	1.62	1.58	1.52
Kamchatka Krai	1.68	1.60	1.63	1.67	1.58	1.57
Kurgan Oblast	1.63	1.63	1.68	1.64	1.55	1.52
Sverdlovsk Oblast	1.60	1.62	1.56	1.55	1.52	1.48
Buryatia	1.95	1.87	1.68	1.60	1.52	1.48
Sakha (Yakutia)	1.86	1.73	1.62	1.55	1.52	1.52
Komi Republic	1.57	1.53	1.53	1.56	1.51	1.51
Krasnodar Krai	1.61	1.64	1.52	1.53	1.51	1.50
Perm Krai	1.53	1.56	1.54	1.53	1.51	1.45
Karelia	1.40	1.43	1.50	1.53	1.50	1.51
Republic of Crimea^{[a]}	1.60	1.58	1.44	1.42	1.50	1.48
Orenburg Oblast	1.55	1.54	1.46	1.50	1.47	1.39
Kostroma Oblast	1.46	1.38	1.52	1.55	1.47	1.40
Khakassia	1.57	1.59	1.54	1.52	1.46	1.44
Novosibirsk Oblast	1.55	1.57	1.49	1.49	1.46	1.43
Moscow	1.47	1.60	1.42	1.42	1.46	1.43
Chelyabinsk Oblast	1.48	1.53	1.47	1.47	1.45	1.39
Tatarstan	1.54	1.57	1.43	1.45	1.44	1.44
Khabarovsk Krai	1.59	1.58	1.50	1.46	1.44	1.40
Omsk Oblast	1.45	1.46	1.52	1.50	1.43	1.42
Kirov Oblast	1.44	1.44	1.50	1.47	1.43	1.43
Primorsky Krai	1.52	1.51	1.43	1.44	1.43	1.39
Amur Oblast	1.54	1.51	1.46	1.49	1.42	1.36
Arkhangelsk Oblast	1.39	1.39	1.49	1.46	1.41	1.35
Krasnoyarsk Krai	1.50	1.51	1.43	1.44	1.41	1.38
Murmansk Oblast	1.45	1.39	1.47	1.45	1.38	1.32
Adygea	1.45	1.52	1.31	1.35	1.38	1.38
Chuvashia	1.47	1.48	1.42	1.40	1.36	1.33
Bashkortostan	1.52	1.49	1.41	1.41	1.36	1.31
Jewish Autonomous Oblast	1.71	1.66	1.62	1.56	1.35	1.39
Karachay-Cherkessia	1.53	1.35	1.30	1.34	1.35	1.37
Udmurtia	1.52	1.54	1.43	1.40	1.35	1.32
Moscow Oblast	1.53	1.46	1.33	1.35	1.34	1.33
Vologda Oblast	1.53	1.52	1.41	1.44	1.33	1.38
Kaluga Oblast	1.48	1.44	1.34	1.34	1.33	1.27
Mari El	1.55	1.53	1.41	1.38	1.33	1.35
Samara Oblast	1.38	1.42	1.33	1.33	1.31	1.30
Ivanovo Oblast	1.24	1.26	1.37	1.35	1.30	1.26
Rostov Oblast	1.35	1.36	1.25	1.27	1.29	1.27
Pskov Oblast	1.43	1.49	1.33	1.30	1.29	1.26
Kalmykia	1.53	1.52	1.43	1.44	1.28	1.20
Nizhny Novgorod Oblast	1.35	1.32	1.31	1.31	1.28	1.31
Yaroslavl Oblast	1.36	1.36	1.31	1.32	1.27	1.23
Ulyanovsk Oblast	1.39	1.40	1.32	1.34	1.27	1.23
Stavropol Krai	1.43	1.42	1.29	1.30	1.26	1.24
Tver Oblast	1.36	1.31	1.30	1.28	1.26	1.24
Saint Petersburg	1.37	1.38	1.28	1.26	1.26	1.25
Kursk Oblast	1.35	1.34	1.29	1.26	1.24	1.20
Altai Krai	1.42	1.40	1.35	1.30	1.24	1.20
Magadan Oblast	1.51	1.41	1.43	1.34	1.23	1.25
Novgorod Oblast	1.38	1.35	1.32	1.26	1.22	1.20
Voronezh Oblast	1.27	1.29	1.23	1.22	1.21	1.22
Kaliningrad Oblast	1.40	1.38	1.26	1.39	1.20	1.22
Oryol Oblast	1.27	1.22	1.21	1.17	1.18	1.12
Lipetsk Oblast	1.38	1.34	1.20	1.23	1.18	1.16
Kemerovo Oblast	1.37	1.34	1.26	1.22	1.17	1.13
Tomsk Oblast	1.27	1.25	1.24	1.19	1.16	1.15
Tambov Oblast	1.28	1.28	1.22	1.21	1.16	1.15
Penza Oblast	1.23	1.24	1.19	1.20	1.15	1.13
Bryansk Oblast	1.31	1.28	1.20	1.19	1.14	1.11
Vladimir Oblast	1.27	1.28	1.16	1.15	1.14	1.06
Tula Oblast	1.25	1.22	1.15	1.18	1.14	1.13
Ryazan Oblast	1.31	1.24	1.14	1.10	1.12	1.13
Volgograd Oblast	1.25	1.28	1.14	1.12	1.12	1.10
Belgorod Oblast	1.24	1.27	1.17	1.12	1.07	1.08
Saratov Oblast	1.23	1.24	1.11	1.10	1.06	1.08
Smolensk Oblast	1.16	1.13	1.08	1.03	1.05	1.01
Sevastopol^{[a]}	1.27	1.25	1.02	0.98	1.00	1.08
Mordovia	1.12	1.11	1.03	1.05	0.99	1.04
Leningrad Oblast	1.06	1.04	0.87	0.88	0.89	0.91

=== 2005-2019 ===
Federal subject	2005	2006	2007	2008	2009	2010	2011	2012	2013	2014	2015	2016	2017	2018	2019
Russian Federation as a whole	1.29	1.31	1.42	1.50	1.54	1.57	1.58	1.69	1.71	1.75	1.78	1.76	1.62	1.58	1.50
Central Federal District	1.16	1.16	1.23	1.30	1.35	1.37	1.38	1.47	1.48	1.51	1.58	1.60	1.47	1.44	1.40
Belgorod Oblast	1.18	1.24	1.34	1.42	1.41	1.40	1.43	1.52	1.53	1.54	1.56	1.55	1.39	1.36	1.29
Bryansk Oblast	1.22	1.23	1.36	1.45	1.47	1.42	1.46	1.56	1.53	1.56	1.65	1.61	1.43	1.43	1.32
Vladimir Oblast	1.25	1.27	1.36	1.43	1.45	1.46	1.50	1.62	1.59	1.64	1.73	1.71	1.52	1.49	1.36
Voronezh Oblast	1.14	1.12	1.19	1.29	1.35	1.36	1.36	1.45	1.44	1.47	1.52	1.48	1.37	1.34	1.27
Ivanovo Oblast	1.18	1.21	1.33	1.39	1.43	1.40	1.41	1.51	1.55	1.57	1.63	1.60	1.46	1.40	1.27
Kaluga Oblast	1.21	1.23	1.34	1.39	1.39	1.48	1.49	1.62	1.64	1.69	1.84	1.78	1.64	1.60	1.43
Kostroma Oblast	1.33	1.37	1.46	1.55	1.63	1.65	1.71	1.83	1.85	1.87	1.89	1.88	1.70	1.61	1.54
Kursk Oblast	1.22	1.26	1.41	1.50	1.51	1.55	1.61	1.70	1.67	1.70	1.72	1.64	1.46	1.44	1.34
Lipetsk Oblast	1.27	1.28	1.36	1.43	1.44	1.47	1.47	1.63	1.60	1.66	1.70	1.69	1.54	1.49	1.39
Moscow Oblast	1.17	1.16	1.20	1.29	1.34	1.37	1.38	1.49	1.52	1.60	1.68	1.73	1.61	1.53	1.37
Oryol Oblast	1.20	1.26	1.34	1.42	1.44	1.50	1.43	1.54	1.53	1.55	1.60	1.59	1.42	1.38	1.27
Ryazan Oblast	1.22	1.21	1.33	1.41	1.40	1.44	1.45	1.54	1.55	1.60	1.64	1.70	1.51	1.45	1.35
Smolensk Oblast	1.14	1.15	1.23	1.30	1.39	1.38	1.40	1.43	1.48	1.53	1.52	1.51	1.37	1.28	1.21
Tambov Oblast	1.21	1.16	1.26	1.29	1.30	1.34	1.33	1.42	1.42	1.49	1.51	1.50	1.38	1.33	1.30
Tver Oblast	1.31	1.33	1.42	1.48	1.53	1.52	1.54	1.65	1.64	1.66	1.70	1.71	1.56	1.47	1.40
Tula Oblast	1.10	1.10	1.15	1.23	1.30	1.31	1.32	1.43	1.42	1.47	1.57	1.55	1.40	1.35	1.26
Yaroslavl Oblast	1.25	1.28	1.34	1.40	1.47	1.49	1.48	1.60	1.64	1.64	1.70	1.71	1.53	1.47	1.37
Moscow	1.07	1.05	1.10	1.15	1.21	1.25	1.25	1.32	1.33	1.34	1.41	1.46	1.38	1.41	1.50
Northwestern Federal District	1.20	1.20	1.29	1.35	1.42	1.44	1.46	1.56	1.57	1.61	1.66	1.67	1.52	1.47	1.39
Karelia	1.30	1.32	1.41	1.50	1.56	1.58	1.60	1.71	1.65	1.74	1.77	1.76	1.56	1.52	1.43
Komi Republic	1.36	1.37	1.48	1.54	1.60	1.63	1.70	1.88	1.96	2.01	2.00	1.97	1.78	1.63	1.57
Arkhangelsk Oblast							1.62	1.74	1.78	1.81	1.82	1.80	1.65	1.56	1.46
Nenets Autonomous Okrug	1.81	1.71	1.88	2.02	2.05	2.11	2.01	2.35	2.31	2.42	2.58	2.77	2.35	2.24	2.17
Vologda Oblast	1.36	1.39	1.47	1.52	1.58	1.60	1.68	1.84	1.85	1.86	1.92	1.90	1.70	1.62	1.53
Kaliningrad Oblast	1.16	1.20	1.40	1.45	1.48	1.46	1.52	1.63	1.64	1.70	1.75	1.73	1.57	1.51	1.39
Leningrad Oblast	1.03	1.01	1.06	1.10	1.16	1.17	1.16	1.22	1.23	1.28	1.29	1.32	1.22	1.12	1.07
Murmansk Oblast	1.25	1.26	1.32	1.39	1.41	1.49	1.49	1.57	1.62	1.65	1.71	1.65	1.56	1.52	1.44
Novgorod Oblast	1.28	1.33	1.45	1.44	1.52	1.55	1.56	1.70	1.70	1.75	1.78	1.78	1.61	1.56	1.44
Pskov Oblast	1.28	1.30	1.40	1.45	1.50	1.51	1.54	1.66	1.68	1.70	1.74	1.80	1.57	1.57	1.47
Saint Petersburg	1.08	1.08	1.14	1.23	1.33	1.38	1.38	1.48	1.48	1.52	1.59	1.63	1.50	1.47	1.40
Southern Federal District	1.28	1.31	1.41	1.50	1.51	1.51	1.52	1.63	1.64	1.71	1.74	1.72	1.59	1.55	1.48
Adygea	1.36	1.38	1.58	1.68	1.65	1.70	1.66	1.71	1.68	1.73	1.72	1.68	1.52	1.47	1.38
Kalmykia	1.64	1.62	1.74	1.84	1.80	1.88	1.81	1.89	1.88	1.85	1.83	1.71	1.54	1.60	1.53
Krasnodar Krai	1.33	1.34	1.45	1.55	1.57	1.57	1.58	1.70	1.72	1.81	1.84	1.83	1.72	1.67	1.62
Astrakhan Oblast	1.53	1.55	1.67	1.75	1.75	1.76	1.78	1.93	1.91	1.97	1.97	1.94	1.73	1.71	1.67
Volgograd Oblast	1.22	1.26	1.37	1.44	1.45	1.45	1.44	1.54	1.53	1.57	1.59	1.57	1.44	1.39	1.29
Rostov Oblast	1.17	1.21	1.29	1.36	1.37	1.38	1.39	1.51	1.52	1.61	1.63	1.60	1.46	1.42	1.35
North Caucasian Federal District	1.64	1.63	1.84	1.96	1.95	1.99	2.01	2.00	1.99	2.03	1.98	1.94	1.87	1.84	1.78
Dagestan	1.70	1.65	1.81	1.93	1.91	1.92	1.98	2.03	2.02	2.08	2.02	1.98	1.91	1.86	1.80
Ingushetia	1.80	1.99	2.22	2.46	2.52	2.99	2.94	2.27	2.23	2.28	1.97	1.75	1.77	1.79	1.83
Kabardino-Balkaria	1.20	1.25	1.54	1.62	1.61	1.66	1.70	1.83	1.80	1.83	1.75	1.72	1.61	1.61	1.51
Karachay-Cherkessia	1.39	1.31	1.55	1.60	1.54	1.51	1.54	1.63	1.67	1.65	1.54	1.52	1.43	1.43	1.48
North Ossetia–Alania	1.44	1.50	1.71	1.78	1.78	1.84	1.86	1.96	1.98	2.01	1.93	1.89	1.75	1.83	1.75
Chechnya	2.95	2.81	3.18	3.44	3.41	3.45	3.36	3.08	2.93	2.91	2.80	2.62	2.73	2.60	2.58
Stavropol Krai	1.23	1.24	1.38	1.47	1.44	1.44	1.43	1.53	1.55	1.62	1.64	1.68	1.54	1.51	1.42
Volga Federal District	1.28	1.30	1.42	1.51	1.54	1.58	1.59	1.72	1.75	1.79	1.82	1.79	1.60	1.56	1.45
Bashkortostan	1.42	1.43	1.63	1.71	1.73	1.77	1.74	1.86	1.89	1.95	1.94	1.86	1.70	1.65	1.51
Mari El	1.34	1.34	1.47	1.53	1.58	1.59	1.66	1.83	1.93	1.98	1.99	1.98	1.75	1.63	1.52
Mordovia	1.14	1.13	1.18	1.26	1.25	1.24	1.25	1.32	1.37	1.37	1.36	1.40	1.26	1.25	1.17
Tatarstan	1.28	1.27	1.38	1.48	1.54	1.60	1.65	1.80	1.83	1.84	1.86	1.86	1.65	1.62	1.54
Udmurtia	1.38	1.40	1.58	1.65	1.71	1.78	1.83	1.98	1.92	1.96	2.01	1.96	1.72	1.63	1.50
Chuvashia	1.32	1.34	1.50	1.51	1.63	1.65	1.67	1.83	1.85	1.88	1.91	1.87	1.65	1.59	1.47
Perm Krai	1.37	1.39	1.52	1.63	1.69	1.77	1.78	1.91	1.93	1.98	2.02	1.98	1.75	1.67	1.56
Kirov Oblast	1.27	1.32	1.45	1.55	1.57	1.59	1.64	1.81	1.87	1.89	1.91	1.94	1.70	1.61	1.49
Nizhny Novgorod Oblast	1.20	1.21	1.30	1.38	1.41	1.42	1.44	1.55	1.56	1.59	1.67	1.65	1.50	1.46	1.35
Orenburg Oblast	1.36	1.42	1.58	1.66	1.74	1.80	1.80	1.95	2.00	2.03	2.01	1.95	1.73	1.70	1.59
Penza Oblast	1.15	1.17	1.30	1.36	1.37	1.37	1.36	1.48	1.49	1.53	1.55	1.50	1.36	1.35	1.26
Samara Oblast	1.22	1.25	1.32	1.41	1.41	1.44	1.44	1.54	1.59	1.65	1.71	1.71	1.53	1.51	1.41
Saratov Oblast	1.18	1.19	1.33	1.39	1.40	1.40	1.40	1.51	1.54	1.57	1.60	1.55	1.39	1.36	1.28
Ulyanovsk Oblast	1.17	1.17	1.24	1.37	1.39	1.41	1.45	1.57	1.61	1.67	1.71	1.71	1.52	1.50	1.42
Ural Federal District	1.36	1.39	1.51	1.62	1.67	1.71	1.75	1.88	1.91	1.96	1.97	1.92	1.76	1.72	1.62
Kurgan Oblast	1.40	1.43	1.59	1.72	1.77	1.79	1.82	2.03	2.12	2.10	2.12	2.03	1.88	1.78	1.64
Sverdlovsk Oblast	1.30	1.34	1.44	1.56	1.62	1.67	1.70	1.83	1.87	1.92	1.95	1.91	1.76	1.70	1.62
Tyumen Oblast							1.84	1.96	1.96	2.05	2.06	2.00	1.88	1.85	1.75
Yugra	1.51	1.52	1.61	1.68	1.72	1.81	1.84	2.02	2.05	2.09	2.07	2.02	1.88	1.87	1.76
Yamalo-Nenets Autonomous Okrug	1.57	1.50	1.61	1.65	1.74	1.79	1.84	2.05	2.09	2.19	2.19	2.08	1.95	1.90	1.83
Chelyabinsk Oblast	1.30	1.34	1.46	1.58	1.61	1.65	1.70	1.81	1.80	1.86	1.84	1.81	1.61	1.57	1.48
Siberian Federal District	1.37	1.39	1.54	1.66	1.70	1.70	1.72	1.86	1.88	1.90	1.90	1.87	1.72	1.64	1.54
Altai Republic	2.05	1.97	2.34	2.55	2.46	2.48	2.84	2.91	2.82	2.88	2.68	2.63	2.36	2.35	2.11
Buryatia	1.63	1.69	1.84	1.94	1.99	1.99	2.03	2.14	2.21	2.26	2.28	2.24	2.06	2.04	1.89
Tuva	2.15	2.12	2.69	2.80	2.96	3.03	3.25	3.35	3.42	3.49	3.39	3.35	3.19	2.97	2.72
Khakassia	1.38	1.43	1.64	1.76	1.79	1.80	1.83	2.00	2.01	2.01	1.99	1.97	1.78	1.71	1.59
Altai Krai	1.30	1.28	1.44	1.58	1.60	1.63	1.65	1.81	1.83	1.84	1.81	1.78	1.64	1.57	1.46
Zabaykalsky Krai	1.59	1.61	1.72	1.84	1.86	1.87	1.87	2.00	2.01	2.08	2.06	1.98	1.87	1.82	1.74
Krasnoyarsk Krai	1.30	1.32	1.42	1.53	1.59	1.61	1.62	1.76	1.78	1.81	1.84	1.82	1.67	1.61	1.51
Irkutsk Oblast	1.44	1.48	1.67	1.82	1.86	1.82	1.86	1.97	1.98	1.97	2.01	1.99	1.86	1.83	1.72
Kemerovo Oblast	1.33	1.38	1.49	1.60	1.65	1.62	1.59	1.76	1.79	1.78	1.73	1.71	1.54	1.49	1.40
Novosibirsk Oblast	1.30	1.28	1.39	1.52	1.57	1.60	1.59	1.71	1.75	1.77	1.82	1.81	1.67	1.63	1.56
Omsk Oblast	1.27	1.28	1.43	1.52	1.56	1.60	1.66	1.86	1.87	1.95	1.91	1.81	1.61	1.58	1.48
Tomsk Oblast	1.23	1.28	1.39	1.48	1.51	1.49	1.48	1.55	1.59	1.59	1.60	1.58	1.47	1.39	1.30
Far Eastern Federal District	1.42	1.42	1.52	1.56	1.62	1.63	1.66	1.78	1.81	1.87	1.89	1.86	1.73	1.74	1.67
Yakutia	1.73	1.72	1.91	1.90	1.97	2.00	2.06	2.17	2.17	2.25	2.19	2.09	1.93	1.85	1.82
Kamchatka Krai	1.41	1.42	1.47	1.52	1.56	1.51	1.61	1.73	1.77	1.85	1.89	1.89	1.78	1.65	1.65
Primorsky Krai	1.31	1.31	1.41	1.43	1.49	1.49	1.53	1.65	1.69	1.73	1.76	1.74	1.60	1.58	1.49
Khabarovsk Krai	1.34	1.36	1.44	1.51	1.56	1.56	1.57	1.70	1.74	1.79	1.85	1.78	1.64	1.60	1.59
Amur Oblast	1.46	1.44	1.54	1.60	1.65	1.69	1.70	1.83	1.84	1.85	1.84	1.82	1.71	1.65	1.53
Magadan Oblast	1.36	1.32	1.35	1.35	1.52	1.44	1.48	1.65	1.69	1.66	1.66	1.60	1.60	1.51	1.42
Sakhalin Oblast	1.43	1.40	1.48	1.57	1.56	1.56	1.57	1.71	1.81	1.96	2.02	2.16	2.03	1.95	1.95
Jewish Autonomous Oblast	1.40	1.47	1.59	1.72	1.64	1.67	1.79	1.84	1.86	1.95	2.02	1.99	1.81	1.85	1.73
Chukotka	1.91	1.78	1.83	1.75	1.67	1.89	1.81	1.97	1.91	2.04	2.10	2.11	2.08	2.02	1.68
Crimean Federal District										1.80	1.82				
Republic of Crimea										1.83	1.82	1.76	1.64	1.63	1.58
Sevastopol										1.65	1.82	1.73	1.56	1.44	1.40

== TFR by ethnic group ==
Out of the dozens of groups listed here, only some have an above replacement fertility (2.06), namely Roma (2.620), Tabasarans (2.327), Turks (2.236), Avars (2.166), Dargins (2.158), Altaians (2.154), Tajiks (2.141) and Kumyks (2.066).

For Jews, the TFR is almost less than half of that needed for replacement. The lowest TFR were registered among Jews (1.282), Russians (1.442), Georgians (1.446) and Ossetians (1.510).

Comparison with the 1989 census shows huge drop in fertility in the Western Caucasus (esp. Karachay-Cherkessia, Adygea and North Ossetia) and some parts of Arctic Russia (Murmansk, Komi, etc.).

The fertility in the Eastern Caucasus is fairly stable, although decreasing.

The figures given are from the 2021 census; the lowest birth rate recorded in Russia was in 1999, it increased thereafter and the birth rate is 9.6 in 2021 compared to 8.7 in 1999.

Number of Births per 1000 Women (2021)
Ethnic Group	For all ages	15 - 17	18 - 19	20 - 24	25 - 29	30 - 34	35 - 39	40 - 44	45 - 49	50 - 54	55 - 59	60 - 64	65 - 69	70+
Russian (excluding Cossack)	1,442	8	45	278	831	1,296	1,534	1,578	1,520	1,509	1,599	1,702	1,733	1,745
Volga Tatar (excluding Kryashen)	1,622	4	27	228	839	1,381	1,657	1,747	1,717	1,709	1,764	1,851	1,938	2,274
Chechen	1,928	4	56	476	1,412	2,182	2,644	2,803	2,723	2,585	2,525	2,556	2,646	3,043
Bashkir	1,725	4	25	250	899	1,465	1,770	1,897	1,896	1,899	1,932	2,018	2,132	2,634
Chuvash	1,871	6	40	329	1,035	1,568	1,820	1,887	1,854	1,851	1,942	2,085	2,217	2,599
Avar	2,166	10	131	685	1,540	2,110	2,438	2,586	2,576	2,582	2,671	2,851	3,171	3,834
Armenian	1,665	3	32	308	988	1,514	1,801	1,894	1,876	1,914	2,000	2,063	2,072	2,186
Ukrainian	1,693	3	42	234	762	1,271	1,552	1,645	1,621	1,616	1,715	1,829	1,896	1,946
Dargin	2,158	5	84	585	1,447	2,033	2,386	2,525	2,532	2,543	2,660	2,901	3,261	4,006
Kazakh	1,914	8	44	359	1,138	1,710	2,001	2,058	1,985	1,941	2,027	2,229	2,520	3,490
Kumyk	2,066	8	122	681	1,578	2,146	2,453	2,518	2,456	2,418	2,489	2,617	2,808	2,366
Kabardian	1,712	5	36	333	1,074	1,642	1,954	2,043	2,026	2,045	2,126	2,191	2,283	2,533
Ingush	1,933	4	26	263	865	1,648	2,290	2,729	2,954	3,159	3,225	3,306	3,332	3,874
Lezgin	2,051	4	76	576	1,414	1,939	2,211	2,306	2,303	2,340	2,467	2,682	3,013	3,770
Ossetian	1,510	2	15	194	732	1,282	1,612	1,766	1,766	1,777	1,812	1,882	1,949	2,066
Mordvin (excluding Mordvin-Erzya)	1,703	5	23	226	792	1,297	1,551	1,630	1,606	1,630	1,742	1,836	1,912	2,267
Yakut	1,953	7	48	400	1,168	1,898	2,324	2,433	2,360	2,315	2,380	2,469	2,556	2,982
Azeri	1,840	6	93	603	1,380	1,845	2,136	2,180	2,144	2,135	2,210	2,396	2,559	2,887
Buryat	1,988	6	57	378	1,131	1,772	2,130	2,230	2,125	2,090	2,207	2,442	2,636	3,122
Mari	1,906	6	39	350	1,089	1,642	1,876	1,959	1,940	1,971	2,055	2,212	2,345	2,636
Udmurt	1,973	3	43	336	1,099	1,701	1,954	2,012	1,973	1,975	2,051	2,169	2,252	2,529
Tajik	2,141	7	104	872	1,867	2,424	2,663	2,670	2,557	2,611	2,646	2,824	2,823	2,749
Uzbek	1,852	7	88	648	1,518	1,962	2,179	2,211	2,176	2,193	2,190	2,211	2,183	2,074
Tuvan	1,996	13	108	554	1,451	2,078	2,416	2,495	2,422	2,344	2,448	2,756	3,108	3,739
Crimean Tatar	1,988	3	39	438	1,278	1,899	2,197	2,278	2,163	2,098	2,183	2,305	2,419	2,780
Karachay	1,772	3	33	296	1,000	1,585	2,034	2,187	2,106	2,102	2,110	2,243	2,347	2,726
Belarusian	1,709	2	32	174	636	1,088	1,460	1,583	1,590	1,553	1,662	1,803	1,807	1,962
German	1,994	8	30	320	980	1,584	1,873	1,896	1,873	1,916	2,075	2,205	2,256	2,455
Kalmyk	1,719	5	28	231	895	1,571	1,924	1,984	1,926	1,850	1,926	2,095	2,133	2,697
Lak	1,928	9	43	410	1,165	1,811	2,087	2,235	2,256	2,262	2,295	2,457	2,703	3,208
Romani	2,620	81	487	1,449	2,574	3,051	3,213	3,172	2,959	3,028	3,107	3,231	3,392	3,796
Tabasaran	2,327	8	122	747	1,667	2,129	2,425	2,550	2,609	2,644	2,768	3,254	3,752	4,864
Komi	2,550	13	78	417	1,207	1,722	1,924	1,917	1,814	1,837	1,940	2,121	2,213	2,443
Kyrgyz	1,947	5	80	577	1,503	2,173	2,437	2,502	2,307	2,297	2,180	2,175	2,078	2,000
Balkar	1,680	1	36	263	923	1,502	1,865	1,944	1,949	1,981	2,023	2,155	2,315	2,758
Turkish	2,236	3	136	851	1,889	2,512	2,767	2,839	2,650	2,596	2,727	2,949	3,245	3,969
Cherkess	1,711	4	37	291	970	1,618	1,907	2,042	2,008	2,000	2,042	2,122	2,232	2,548
Georgian	1,446	3	38	200	761	1,237	1,499	1,631	1,649	1,659	1,679	1,712	1,791	1,799
Adyghe	1,646	2	21	304	945	1,526	1,834	1,813	1,809	1,788	1,843	1,935	1,948	2,345
Korean	1,555	3	32	184	654	1,211	1,591	1,664	1,653	1,591	1,695	1,812	1,883	2,078
Jewish	1,282	10	29	162	493	916	1,261	1,499	1,504	1,410	1,420	1,453	1,468	1,433
Altaian	2,145	6	70	590	1,428	2,111	2,429	2,588	2,416	2,333	2,380	2,610	2,761	3,363
Moldovan	1,722	12	49	362	971	1,495	1,735	1,840	1,768	1,806	1,919	2,043	2,078	2,202

== Natural growth by federal subject ==
The figures are from 2024.

	Total			Crude (per 1,000)		
Federal subject	Births	Deaths	Natural change	Birth rate	Death rate	Natural change
Russian Federation	1,222,408	1,818,635	-596,227	8.4	12.5	-4.1
Moscow	120,215	116,478	+3,737	9.1	8.9	+0.2
Moscow Oblast	71,434	96,608	-25,174	8.3	11.2	-2.9
Krasnodar Krai	51,509	73,705	-22,196	8.8	12.7	-3.9
Saint Petersburg	47,148	62,471	-15,323	8.4	11.2	-2.8
Dagestan	43,322	15,324	+27,998	13.3	4.7	+8.6
Sverdlovsk Oblast	36,948	57,874	-20,926	8.8	13.7	-4.9
Tatarstan	35,319	45,062	-9,743	8.8	11.3	-2.5
Bashkortostan	32,968	51,214	-18,246	8.1	12.6	-4.5
Rostov Oblast	31,734	55,483	-23,749	7.7	13.4	-5.7
Chechnya	31,293	7,228	+24,065	20.0	4.6	+15.4
Chelyabinsk Oblast	28,923	46,048	-17,125	8.5	13.6	-5.1
Novosibirsk Oblast	24,689	37,306	-12,617	8.9	13.4	-4.5
Krasnoyarsk Krai	24,687	36,097	-11,410	8.7	12.7	-4.0
Stavropol Krai	23,395	31,776	-8,381	8.1	11.0	-2.9
Samara Oblast	22,992	43,273	-20,281	7.4	13.9	-6.5
Irkutsk Oblast	22,304	32,158	-9,854	9.6	13.8	-4.2
Nizhny Novgorod Oblast	21,995	45,371	-23,376	7.2	14.9	-7.7
Perm Krai	21,580	34,723	-13,143	8.7	14.0	-5.3
Khanty–Mansi A.O. (Yugra)	18,742	11,328	+7,414	10.6	6.4	+4.2
Kemerovo Oblast	17,198	37,058	-19,860	6.8	14.6	-7.8
Tyumen Oblast	16,973	17,166	-193	10.5	10.6	-0.1
Volgograd Oblast	16,051	32,460	-16,409	6.6	13.3	-6.7
Republic of Crimea^{[a]}	15,834	27,318	-11,484	8.3	14.3	-6.0
Voronezh Oblast	15,725	33,419	-17,694	6.9	14.8	-7.9
Orenburg Oblast	15,366	26,368	-11,002	8.4	14.5	-6.1
Altai Krai	15,351	32,249	-16,898	7.3	15.3	-8.0
Primorsky Krai	15,188	25,666	-10,478	8.4	14.2	-5.8
Saratov Oblast	14,815	33,528	-18,713	6.2	14.1	-7.9
Omsk Oblast	14,046	24,790	-10,744	7.7	13.7	-6.0
Leningrad Oblast	11,840	22,300	-10,460	5.8	11.0	-5.2
Udmurtia	11,418	19,184	-7,766	8.0	13.4	-5.4
Khabarovsk Krai	11,142	17,880	-6,738	8.7	14.0	-5.3
Sakha (Yakutia)	10,778	8,243	+2,535	10.7	8.2	+2.5
Kabardino-Balkaria	10,180	6,963	+3,217	11.2	7.7	+3.5
Zabaykalsky Krai	9,972	14,073	-4,101	10.2	14.3	-4.1
Buryatia	9,535	11,830	-2,295	9.8	12.2	-2.4
Astrakhan Oblast	9,199	11,485	-2,286	9.7	12.1	-2.4
Belgorod Oblast	9,179	20,937	-11,758	6.1	14.0	-7.9
Chuvashia	8,869	15,317	-6,448	7.6	13.2	-5.6
Tula Oblast	8,851	22,324	-13,473	6.0	15.2	-9.2
Yaroslavl Oblast	8,471	18,265	-9,794	7.2	15.4	-8.2
Vologda Oblast	8,230	16,163	-7,933	7.4	14.5	-7.1
Ulyanovsk Oblast	8,216	17,685	-9,469	7.0	15.1	-8.1
Vladimir Oblast	8,072	21,174	-13,102	6.2	16.2	-10.0
Tver Oblast	8,064	19,758	-11,694	6.8	16.5	-9.7
Kaluga Oblast	7,981	14,152	-6,171	7.5	13.3	-5.8
Ingushetia	7,962	1,833	+6,129	15.0	3.5	+11.5
Kirov Oblast	7,912	18,131	-10,219	7.0	16.1	-9.1
Penza Oblast	7,736	19,234	-11,498	6.3	15.6	-9.3
Tomsk Oblast	7,586	12,773	-5,187	7.3	12.3	-5.0
Kaliningrad Oblast	7,477	13,016	-5,539	7.3	12.6	-5.3
Lipetsk Oblast	7,402	16,247	-8,845	6.7	14.6	-7.9
Bryansk Oblast	7,371	16,312	-8,941	6.5	14.3	-7.8
Kursk Oblast	7,252	15,848	-8,596	6.9	15.0	-8.1
North Ossetia–Alania	7,237	6,655	+582	10.7	9.8	+0.9
Arkhangelsk Oblast	6,886	13,795	-6,909	7.2	14.5	-7.3
Yamalo Nenets A.O.	6,648	3,029	+3,619	12.8	5.9	+6.9
Amur Oblast	6,530	10,624	-4,094	8.7	14.2	-5.5
Ryazan Oblast	6,376	16,555	-10,179	5.9	15.4	-9.5
Ivanovo Oblast	6,179	14,897	-8,718	6.9	16.5	-9.6
Komi Republic	5,946	10,051	-4,105	8.3	14.0	-5.7
Tambov Oblast	5,854	15,095	-9,241	6.2	15.9	-9.7
Kurgan Oblast	5,508	12,871	-7,363	7.4	17.2	-9.8
Tuva	5,352	3,257	+2,095	15.8	9.6	+6.2
Murmansk Oblast	5,108	8,068	-2,960	7.8	12.3	-4.5
Mari El	5,022	8,597	-3,575	7.5	12.9	-5.4
Smolensk Oblast	4,931	13,153	-8,222	5.7	15.3	-9.6
Khakassia	4,540	7,052	-2,512	8.6	13.4	-4.8
Oryol Oblast	4,509	10,978	-6,469	6.5	15.9	-9.4
Sakhalin Oblast	4,472	6,477	-2,005	9.8	14.2	-4.4
Karachay-Cherkessia	4,357	4,049	+308	9.3	8.6	+0.7
Adygea	4,329	5,249	-920	8.7	10.5	-1.8
Mordovia	4,194	10,198	-6,004	5.5	13.4	-7.9
Kostroma Oblast	4,156	9,391	-5,235	7.4	16.7	-9.3
Karelia	4,017	8,802	-4,785	7.7	16.9	-9.2
Pskov Oblast	3,937	10,157	-6,220	6.8	17.6	-10.8
Novgorod Oblast	3,757	9,059	-5,302	6.6	15.9	-9.3
Sevastopol^{[a]}	3,707	6,197	-2,490	6.6	11.1	-4.5
Kamchatka Krai	2,736	3,698	-962	9.5	12.8	-3.3
Altai Republic	2,429	2,584	-155	11.5	12.3	-0.8
Kalmykia	2,126	2,598	-472	8.0	9.7	-1.7
Jewish Autonomous Oblast	1,120	2,193	-1,073	7.7	15.1	-7.4
Magadan Oblast	1,009	1,689	-680	7.6	12.7	-5.1
Chukotka	515	493	+22	10.7	10.3	+0.4
Nenets Autonomous Okrug	482	448	+34	11.4	10.6	+0.8

=== Notes ===
a. Not recognized internationally as a part of Russia.

== See also ==
- Demographics of Russia
