= Agin-Buryat Okrug =

Okrug of Zabaykalsky Krai, Russia

Agin-Buryat Okrug Агинский-Бурятский округ (Russian)
- District
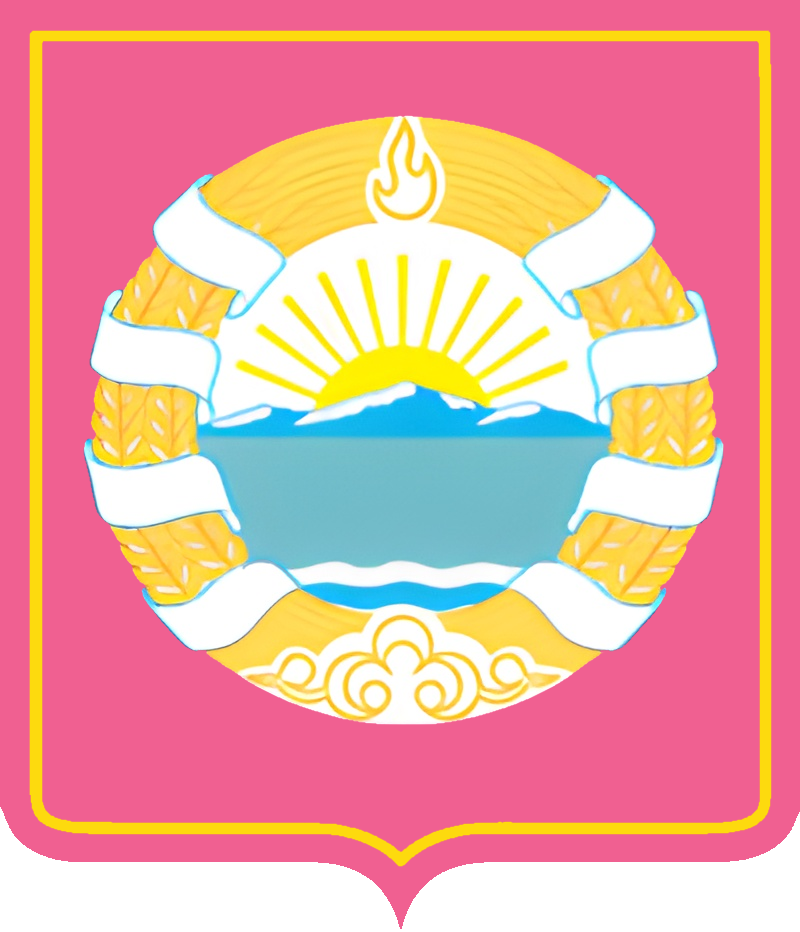
- Flag Coat of arms

- Coordinates: 51°00′N 114°30′E
- Country: Russia
- Federal subject: Zabaykalsky Krai
- Established: 2008
- Administrative center: Aginskoye

Area
  - Total: 19,600 km^{2} (7,600 sq mi)

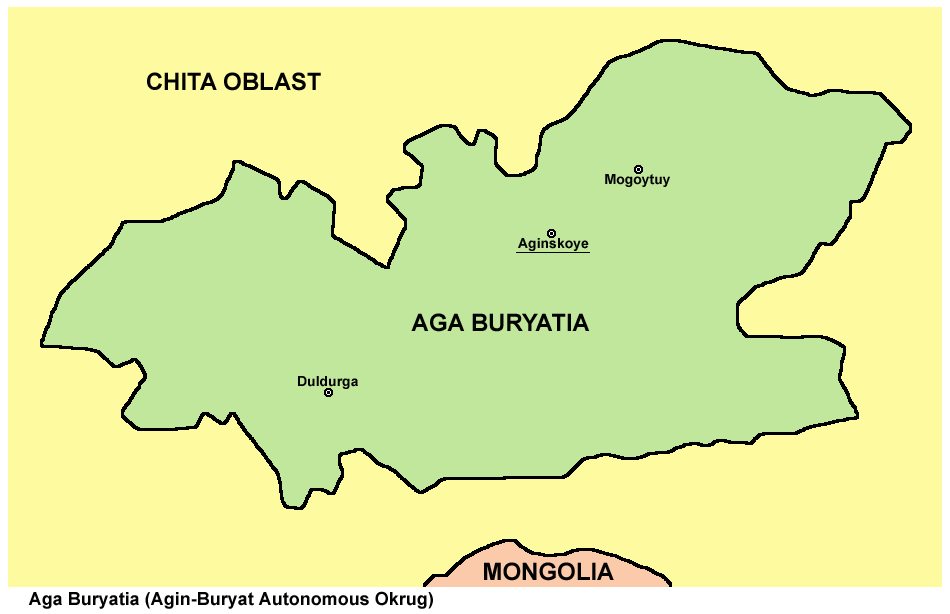
Map of Agin-Buryat Okrug

Agin-Buryat Okrug (Russian: Агинский Бурятский округ; Buryat: Агын Буряадай тойрог, romanized: Agiin Buryaadai toirog, IPA: [ɐˈɣɨɴ bʊˈrʲadæ ˈtœrəq]), or simply Aga Buryatia, is an administrative division of Zabaykalsky Krai, Russia. It was a federal subject of Russia (an autonomous okrug of Chita Oblast) until it merged with Chita Oblast to form Zabaykalsky Krai on 1 March 2008. Prior to the merger, it was called Agin-Buryat Autonomous Okrug (Агинский Бурятский автономный округ). Its administrative center is the urban-type settlement of Aginskoye. It is one of the two Buryat okrugs in Russia, the other one is Ust-Orda Buryat Okrug of Irkutsk Oblast.

- Area: 19,312.3 square kilometers (7,456.5 sq mi)
- Population: 77,167 (2010 census); 72,213 (2002 census); 77,032 (1989 Soviet census).

== Demographics ==
=== Vital statistics ===
Source: Russian Federal State Statistics Service

	Average population (x 1000)	Live births	Deaths	Natural change	Crude birth rate (per 1000)	Crude death rate (per 1000)	Natural change (per 1000)	Fertility rates
1970	66	1 699	451	1 248	25.7	6.8	18.9	
1975	68	1 881	541	1 340	27.7	8.0	19.7	
1980	70	2 035	686	1 349	29.1	9.8	19.3	
1985	75	2 259	638	1 621	30.1	8.5	21.6	
1990	71	1 868	604	1 264	26.5	8.6	17.9	
1991	71	1 647	591	1 056	23.1	8.3	14.8	
1992	72	1 518	655	863	20.9	9.0	11.9	
1993	73	1 435	759	676	19.6	10.4	9.2	2.76
1994	73	1 429	864	565	19.6	11.8	7.7	2.72
1995	72	1 338	738	600	18.5	10.2	8.3	2.57
1996	71	1 174	765	409	16.4	10.7	5.7	2.30
1997	71	1 115	698	417	15.7	9.8	5.9	2.19
1998	71	1 182	722	460	16.6	10.1	6.5	2.29
1999	71	1 163	771	392	16.3	10.8	5.5	2.22
2000	71	1 098	838	260	15.4	11.8	3.6	2.08
2001	71	1 171	841	330	16.4	11.8	4.6	2.21
2002	72	1 197	886	311	16.6	12.3	4.3	2.26
2003	73	1 229	840	389	16.9	11.6	5.4	2.28
2004	73	1 222	900	322	16.8	12.4	4.4	2.20
2005	73	1 234	901	333	16.9	12.3	4.6	2.12
2006	73	1 330	885	445	18.1	12.0	6.1	2.17
2007	74	1 543	817	726	20.9	11.0	9.8	2.43
2008	75	1 732	770	962	23.2	10.3	12.9	2.64
2009	76	1 739	729	1 010	23.0	9.6	13.3	2,63
2010	77	1 837	729	1 108	23.9	9.5	14.4	2.71

=== Ethnic groups ===
While residents of the autonomous okrug (as of the 2020 census) identified themselves as belonging to 54 different ethnic groups, most of them consider themselves either Buryats (65.3%) or ethnic Russians (33.2%), the Tatars at 390 (0.5%) ending up as a distant third most numerous group in the region.

Ethnic group	1959 census		1970 census		1979 census		1989 census		2002 census		2010 census		2020 census	
Ethnic group	Number	%	Number	%	Number	%	Number	%	Number	%	Number	%	Number	%
Buryats	23,374	47.6%	33,117	50.4%	35,868	52.0%	42,362	54.9%	45,149	62.5%	50,125	65.1%	45,242	65.3%
Russians	23,857	48.6%	28,966	44.0%	29,098	42.1%	31,473	40.8%	25,366	35.1%	25,079	32.5%	22,988	33.2%
Others	1,878	3.8%	3,685	5.6%	4,069	5.9%	3,353	4.3%	1,698	2.4%	1,838	2.4%	1,021	1.5%

== See also ==
- Administrative divisions of Agin-Buryat Autonomous Okrug
