= Agin-Buryat Autonomous Okrug =

Former federal subject of Russia

Agin-Buryat Autonomous Okrug Агинский Бурятский автономный округ (Russian) Агын Буряадай автономито тойрог (Buryat)
- Autonomous okrug of Russia
- 1937–2008
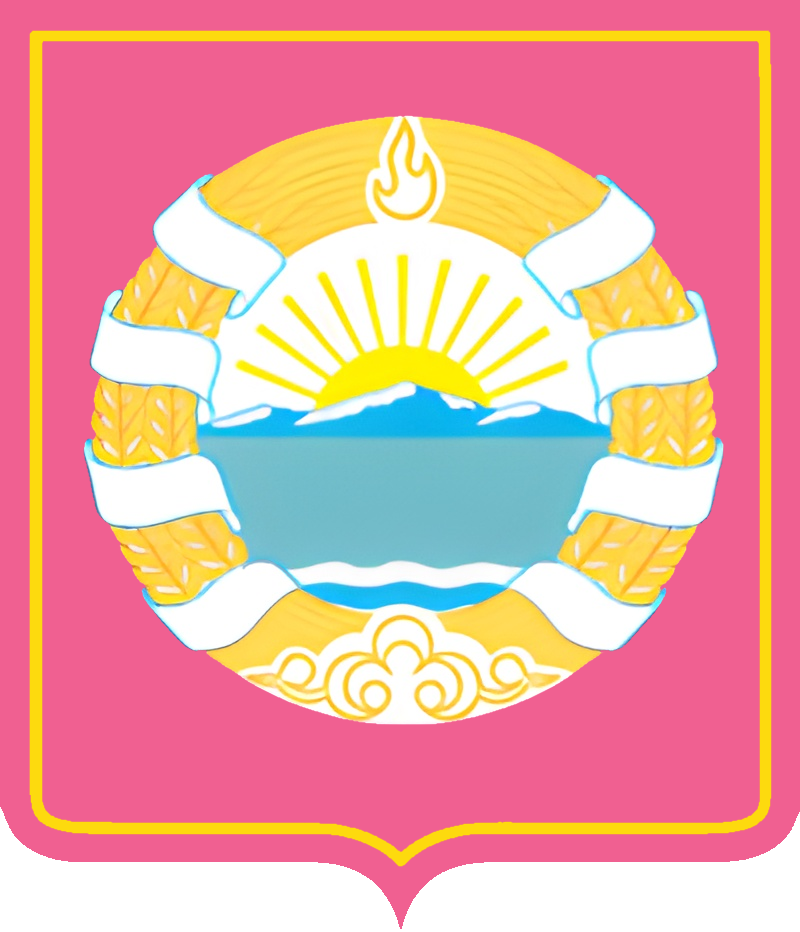
- Flag Coat of arms

Anthem
- Golden Land, Hurrah!
- Capital: Aginskoye
- Area
  - 2010: 19,592 km^{2} (7,565 sq mi)
- Population
  - 2010: 77,167
- ISO: RU-AGB
- Government
  - Type: Federated state
- Governor
  - 1997 – 2008: Bair Zhamsuyev
- Legislature: Duma
- History
  - Established: 26 September 1937
  - Autonomous okrug status: 7 October 1977
  - Disestablished: 1 March 2008
- Contained within
  - Federal district: Siberian
  - Economic region: East Siberian
Succeeded by
Agin-Buryat Okrug; Zabaykalsky Krai

Agin-Buryat Autonomous Okrug (Note: Russian: Агинский Бурятский автономный округ, АБАО, romanized: Aginsky Buryatsky avtonomny okrug, ABAO; Buryat: Агын Буряадай автономито тойрог, romanized: Agyn Buriaadai avtonomito toirog.) was a federal subject of the Russian Federation. On 1 March 2008, the region merged with Chita Oblast (which it was surrounded by) to form the new Zabaykalsky Krai. The territory of the former ABAO is now the Agin-Buryat Okrug of Zabaykalsky Krai, in which it has a special status.

== History ==
=== Soviet Union ===
The district was first created in its modern form on 26 September 1937 as the Agin Buryat-Mongol National Okrug within Chita Oblast. Following the change of the ethnonym "Buryat-Mongol" to "Buryat" on 16 September 1958, the region was renamed to Agin-Buryat National Okrug, and became the Agin-Buryat Autonomous Okrug" on 7 October 1977.

=== Russian Federation ===
From 31 March 1992, the district was both an independent federal subject of Russia and a part of Chita Oblast until it was abolished on 1 March 2008.

== Merging with Chita Oblast ==
Work on merging the region with Chita Oblast began in April 2006. The authorities of both regions sent a letter to president Vladimir Putin who supported this initiative to merge the two regions. The merger referendum was held on 11 March 2007.

In Agin-Buryat Autonomous Okrug, 94% (38,814 people) supported the merger, 5.16% (2,129 people) were against. 82.95% of the population of the autonomous okrug took part in the referendum.

In Chita Oblast, 90.29% (535,045 people) supported the merger, 8.89% (52,698 people) were against. 72.82% of the population of the oblast took part in the referendum.

As a result of the majority of voters in both regions supporting the unification of the two regions, Zabaykalsky Krai was formed on 1 March 2008.

== Administrative divisions ==
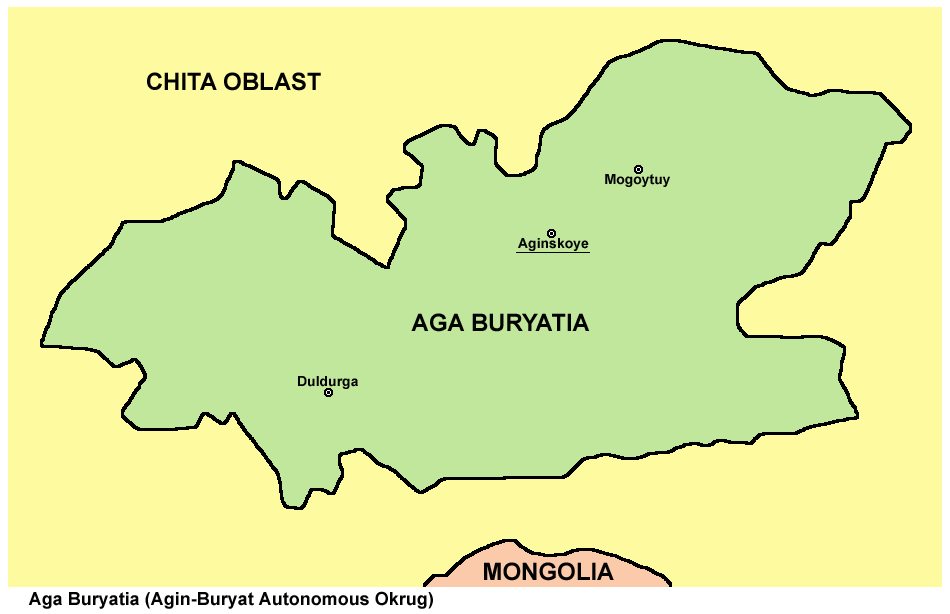
Map of the Agin-Buryat Autonomous Okrug

The autonomous okrug had three districts:

- Aginsky District
- Duldurginsky District
- Mogoytuysky District

== Governors ==
No.	Portrait	Governor	Tenure	Time in office	Party	Election
1		Gurodarma Tsedashiyev (1948–2015)	26 December 1991 – 13 January 1996 (resigned)	4 years, 18 days	Independent	Appointed
2		Bolot Ayushiyev (born 1949)	13 January 1996 – 6 February 1997 (resigned)	1 year, 24 days	Independent	Appointed ~~1996~~ (Note: Annulled election.)
3		Bair Zhamsuyev (born 1959)	5 March 1997 – 1 March 2008 (autonomy dissolved)	10 years, 362 days	Independent → United Russia	1997; 2000; 2005 (Note: Appointed by the president of Russia with the consent of the Agin Buryat Duma.)
