= Chita Oblast =

Former federal subject of Russia

Coordinates: 52°2′N 113°30′E

- Oblast of Russia
- 1937–2008
- Flag Coat of arms

- History
  - Established: 26 September 1937
  - Disestablished: 1 March 2008
Succeeded by
Zabaykalsky Krai
- Today part of: Russia · Zabaykalsky Krai

Chita Oblast (Russian: Чити́нская о́бласть, romanized: Čitínskaja óblastj, IPA: [tɕɪˈtʲinskəjə ˈobləsʲtʲ]) was a federal subject of Russia (an oblast) in southeast Siberia, Russia. Its administrative center was the city of Chita. It had extensive international borders with China (998 km) and Mongolia (868 km) and internal borders with Irkutsk and Amur Oblasts, as well as with the republics of Buryatia and Yakutia. Its area was 431,500 square kilometers (166,600 sq mi). Population: 1,155,346 (2002 census); 1,377,975 (1989 Soviet census).

The oblast was established on September 26, 1937. On March 1, 2008, Chita Oblast merged with Agin-Buryat Autonomous Okrug to form Zabaykalsky Krai.

The territory that made up the former Chita Oblast was first explored by Cossacks led by Pyotr Beketov in 1653. People began to move into and develop the area in order to strengthen Russia's border with China and Mongolia, extract mineral resources, and build the Trans-Siberian Railway. In 1920, Chita became the capital of the Far East Republic, which merged with Russia in November 1922, a month before the USSR was constituted.

The oblast was rich in ferrous, non-ferrous, rare, and precious metals, coal, charcoal, and mineral waters. Russia's estimated reserves of ores with a high uranium content are 145,400 tons. Most of these deposits are located in the former Chita Oblast, near Krasnokamensk, site of the Priargunsky Mining and Chemical Combine (PMCC). Forests cover about 60% of its territory. As a result, the oblast's main industries were metallurgy, fuel, and timber. It also had advanced light and food industries. Local agriculture focused on cattle, sheep, and reindeer breeding.

== Demographics ==
Birth rate: Quite high at 13.77 (2004), but still there were more deaths than births (2005 official figures).

The population were mostly Russians and Buryats, along with some Ukrainians and a few Evenks. There were 1,000 Jews, who mostly speak Yiddish in the regional capital. According to the 2002 census, Russians made up 89.8% of the population while Buryats were 6.1%. Other significant groups were Tatars (0.71%), Armenians (0.31%), Belarusians (0.26%), Azeri (0.18%), Evenks (0.13%), Nemts (0.11%), Chuvash (0.11%), Bashkirs (0.11%), Moldvins (0.07%), Mordvins (0.06%), Uzbeks (0.06%) and Dargwa (0.05%).

In 2007, Chita Oblast recorded a small natural population increase (+0.03% without taking any migration into account), becoming one of the only two Russian federal subjects to reverse its population decline in 2007. The other federal subject was Kamchatka Oblast, with a NGPR of +0.005%. Chita Oblast is one of only twenty Russian federal subjects to have a positive natural population growth, but the population of Chita actually decreased in 2007 due to very heavy emigration.

Vital Statistics for 2007: Source

- Birth rate: 14.63 per 1,000
- Death rate: 14.33 per 1,000
- Net immigration: -3.2 per 1,000
- NGR: +0.03% per year
- PGR: -0.29% per year
