= Aginsky District =

Aginsky District Агинский район (Russian)
- District
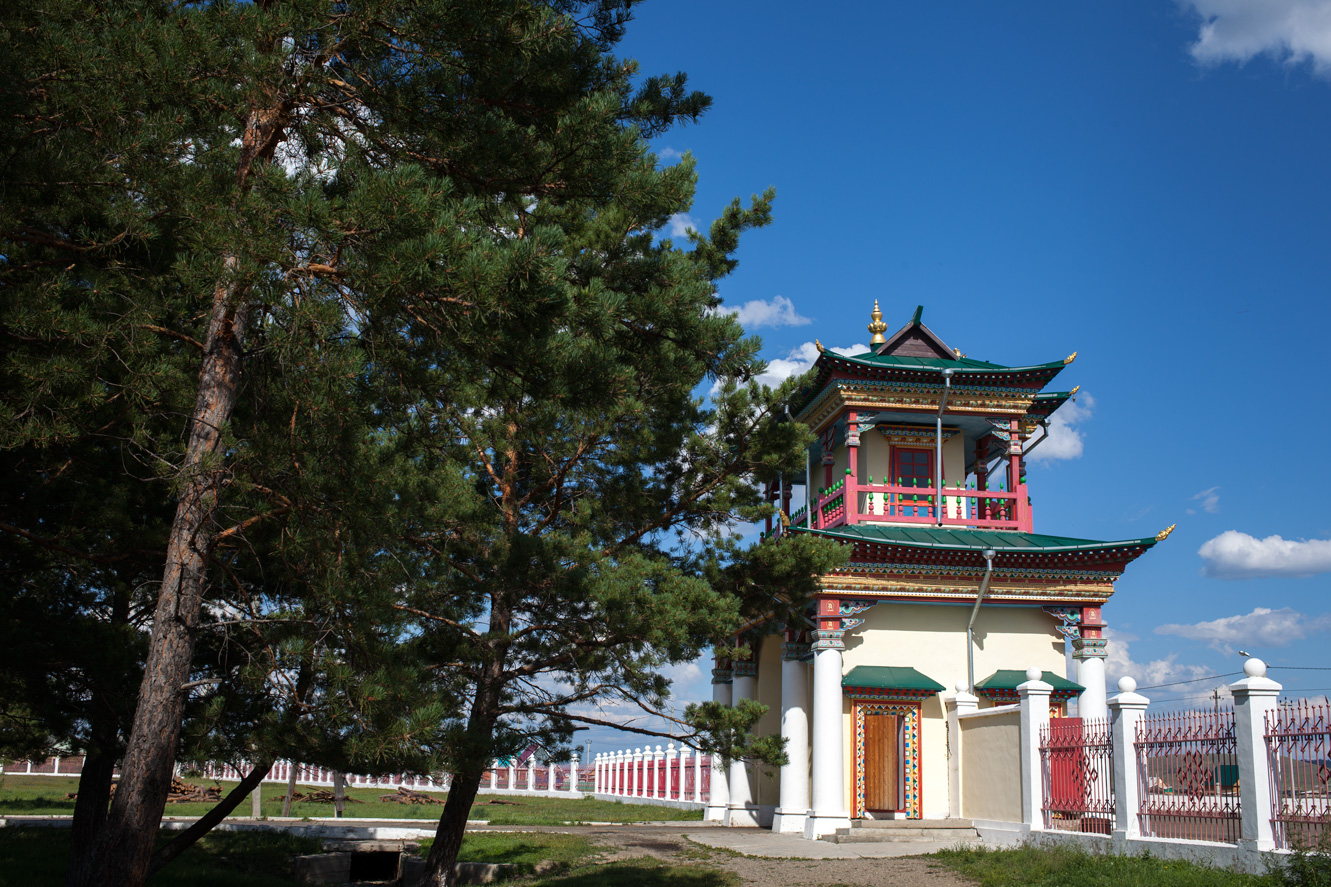
- Complex Agin Datsan

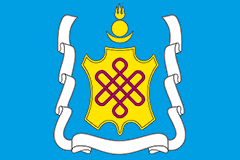
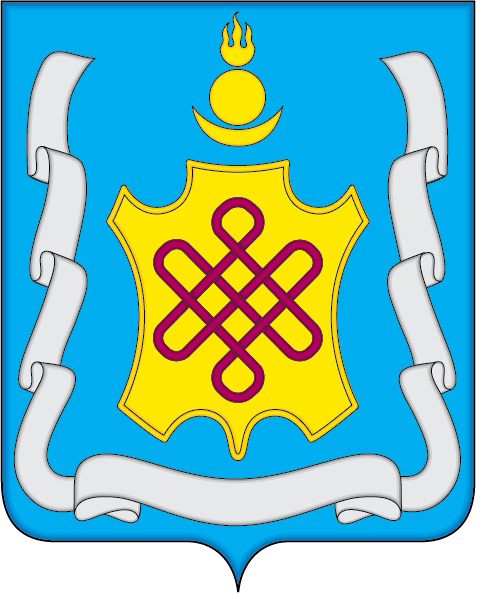
- Flag Coat of arms
- Location of Aginsky District in Agin-Buryat Okrug, Zabaykalsky Krai
- Coordinates: 50.899°N 114.533°E
- Country: Russia
- Federal subject: Zabaykalsky Krai
- Established: January 16, 1941
- Administrative center: Aginskoye

Area
  - Total: 6,300 km^{2} (2,400 sq mi)

Population (2010 Census)
  - Total: 34,354
  - Density: 5.5/km^{2} (14/sq mi)
  - Urban: 60.8%
  - Rural: 39.2%

Administrative structure
  - Inhabited localities: 3 urban-type settlements, 21 rural localities

Municipal structure
  - Municipally incorporated as: Aginsky Municipal District
  - Municipal divisions: 2 urban settlements, 11 rural settlements
- Time zone: UTC+9 (MSK+6)
- OKTMO ID: 76602000
- Website: http://www.aginskmr.ru/

Aginsky District (Russian: Агинский райо́н) is an administrative district (raion) Agin-Buryat Okrug of Zabaykalsky Krai, Russia, one of the thirty-one in the krai. It is located in the south of the krai, and borders with Karymsky District in the north, Mogoytuysky District in the east, Ononsky District in the south, and with Duldurginsky District in the west. The area of the district is 6,300 square kilometers (2,400 sq mi). Its administrative center is the urban locality (an urban-type settlement) of Aginskoye. Population: 34,354 (2010 census); 29,511 (2002 Census); 32,835 (1989 Soviet census). The population of Aginskoye accounts for 45.4% of the district's total population.

== History ==
The district was established on January 16, 1941.

== Administrative and municipal status ==
Within the framework of administrative divisions, Aginsky District is one of the thirty-one in the krai. The urban-type settlement of Aginskoye serves as its administrative center.

As a municipal division, the territory of the district is split between two municipal formations—Aginsky Municipal District, to which two urban-type settlements and twenty of the administrative district's rural localities belong, and Aginskoye Urban Okrug, which covers the rest of the administrative district's territory, including the urban-type settlement of Aginskoye and the remaining rural locality.
