= Aginskoye, Zabaykalsky Krai =

Aginskoye Агинское
- Urban-type settlement
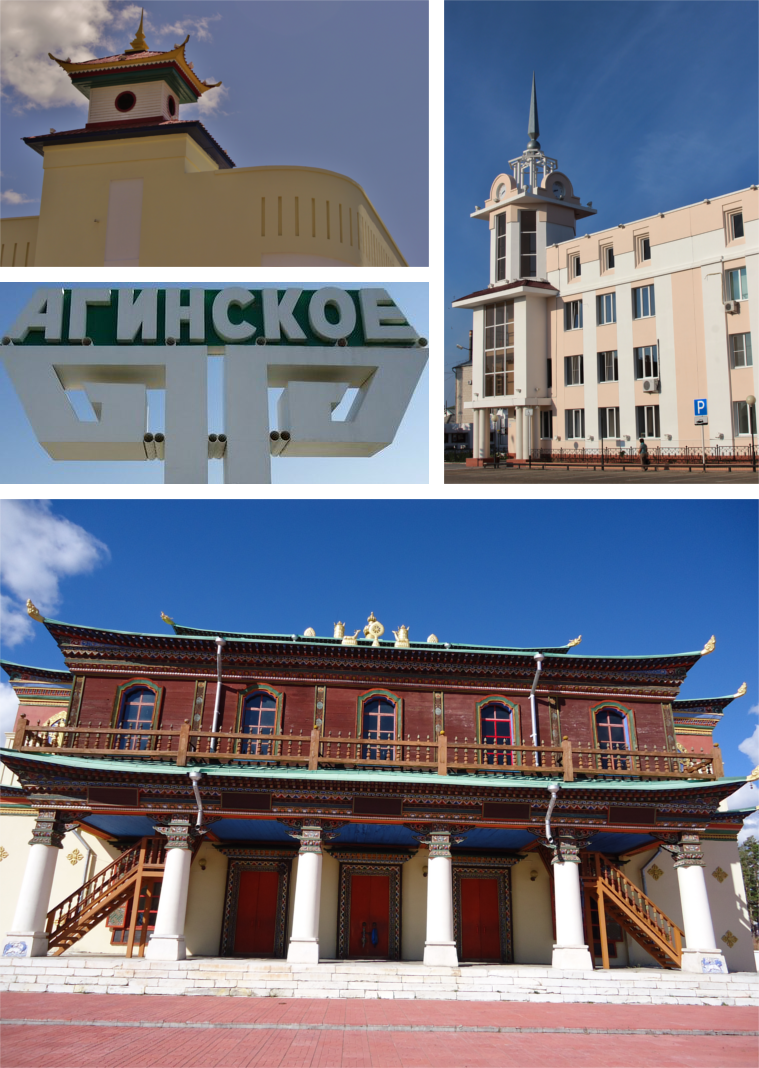
- Clockwise: Aginskoye Town Administration building, Agin-Buryat Okrug Administration building, Aginsky Datsan, Town entrance sign

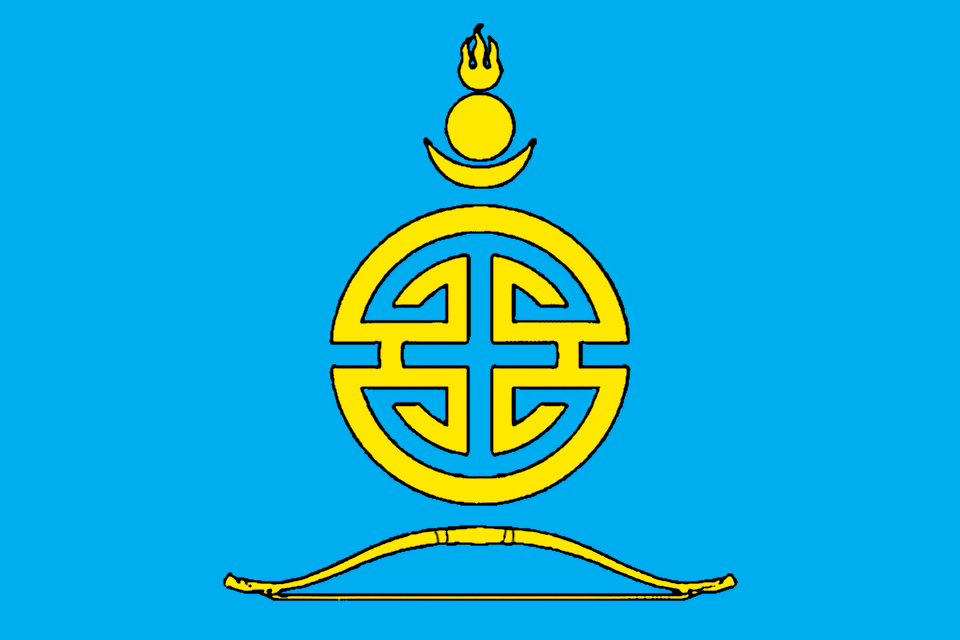
- Flag
- Interactive map of Aginskoye
- Location of Aginskoye Aginskoye (Zabaykalsky Krai)
- Coordinates: 51°06′N 114°30′E
- Country: Russia
- Federal subject: Zabaykalsky Krai
- Administrative district: Aginsky District
- Founded: 1781 or 1811^{(see text)}
- Urban-type settlement status since: 1959
- Elevation: 675 m (2,215 ft)

Population (2010 Census)
  - Total: 15,596
  - Estimate (1 January 2018): 17,841 (+14.4%)

Administrative status
  - Capital of: Aginsky District

Municipal status
  - Urban okrug: Aginskoye Urban Okrug
  - Capital of: Aginskoye Urban Okrug
- Time zone: UTC+9 (MSK+6)
- Postal codes: 687000, 687599
- OKTMO ID: 76702000051
- Website: go-aginskoe.ru

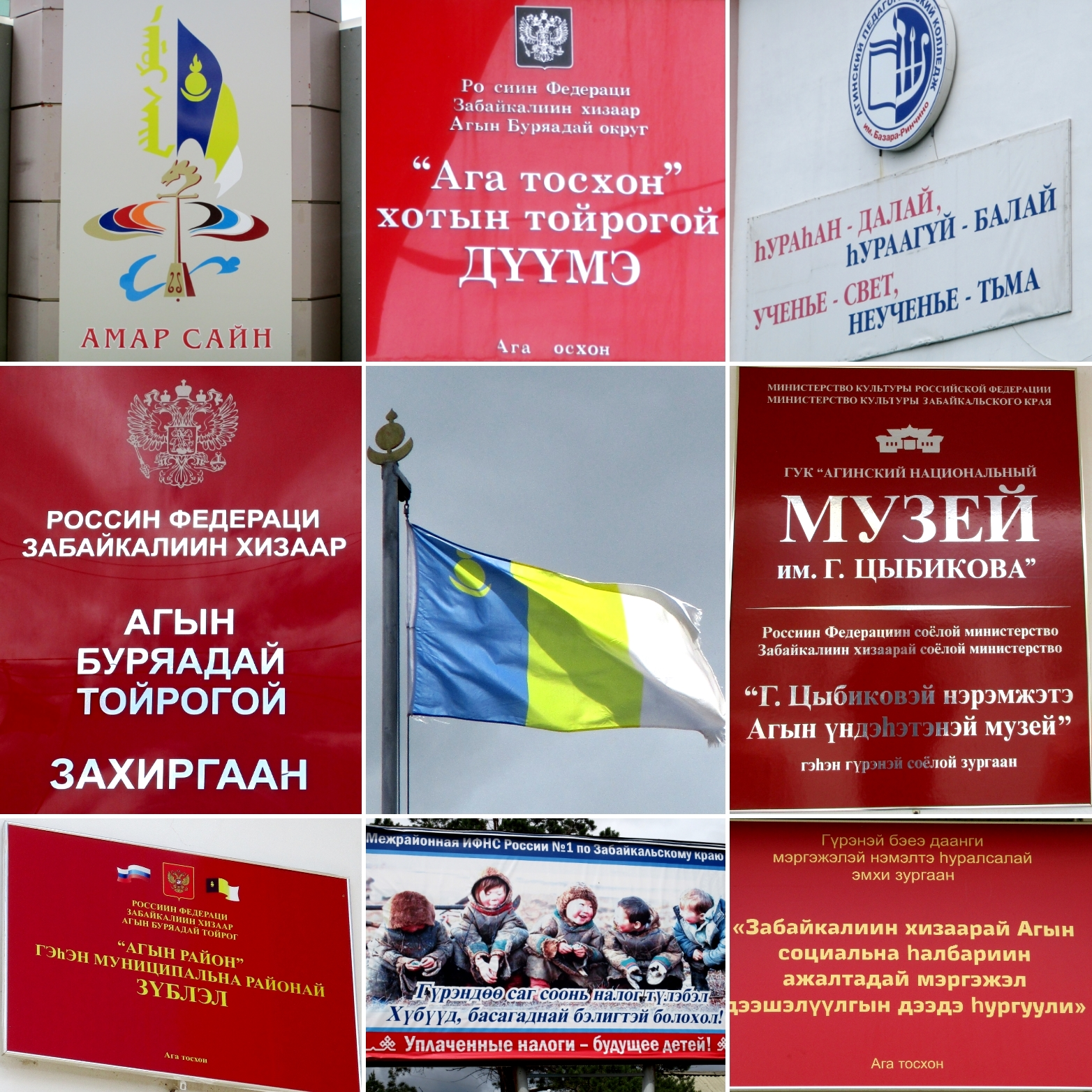
Examples of Buriad usage in Aginskoie public space

Aginskoye (Russian: Аги́нское; Buryat: Ага, Aga; Mongolian: Аг, Ag) is an urban locality (an urban-type settlement) and the administrative center of Agin-Buryat Okrug and of Aginsky District in Zabaykalsky Krai, Russia. It is located in the valley of the Aga River (the Amur basin). Population: 15,596 (2010 census); 11,717 (2002 census); 9,286 (1989 Soviet census); 7,200 (1967).

== History ==
It was founded in 1781 or, according to other sources, in 1811.

== Administrative and municipal status ==
Within the framework of administrative divisions, Aginskoye serves as the administrative center of Aginsky District and is subordinated to it. As a municipal division, the urban-type settlement of Aginskoye together with one rural locality in Aginsky District is incorporated as Aginskoye Urban Okrug.

== Climate ==
Aginskoye experiences a dry-winter borderline humid continental climate/subarctic climate (Köppen climate classification: Dwb/Dwc) with very cold, very dry winters and warm, wet summers.

Climate data for Aginskoye (extremes 1936–present)
| Month | Jan | Feb | Mar | Apr | May | Jun | Jul | Aug | Sep | Oct | Nov | Dec | Year |
|---|---|---|---|---|---|---|---|---|---|---|---|---|---|
| Record high °C (°F) | 0.5 (32.9) | 9.2 (48.6) | 22.0 (71.6) | 30.4 (86.7) | 35.6 (96.1) | 39.7 (103.5) | 38.8 (101.8) | 37.7 (99.9) | 33.9 (93.0) | 25.8 (78.4) | 12.2 (54.0) | 5.6 (42.1) | 39.7 (103.5) |
| Mean daily maximum °C (°F) | −14.5 (5.9) | −8.7 (16.3) | 0.0 (32.0) | 10.0 (50.0) | 18.5 (65.3) | 24.6 (76.3) | 26.5 (79.7) | 23.8 (74.8) | 17.3 (63.1) | 7.5 (45.5) | −4.8 (23.4) | −13.1 (8.4) | 7.3 (45.1) |
| Daily mean °C (°F) | −22.4 (−8.3) | −17.8 (0.0) | −8.6 (16.5) | 2.0 (35.6) | 10.1 (50.2) | 16.6 (61.9) | 19.2 (66.6) | 16.5 (61.7) | 9.2 (48.6) | −0.2 (31.6) | −12.1 (10.2) | −20.2 (−4.4) | −0.6 (30.9) |
| Mean daily minimum °C (°F) | −28.6 (−19.5) | −25.3 (−13.5) | −16.7 (1.9) | −5.9 (21.4) | 1.4 (34.5) | 8.2 (46.8) | 12.1 (53.8) | 9.8 (49.6) | 2.0 (35.6) | −6.7 (19.9) | −18.2 (−0.8) | −26.1 (−15.0) | −7.8 (17.9) |
| Record low °C (°F) | −45.5 (−49.9) | −47.6 (−53.7) | −38.9 (−38.0) | −25.4 (−13.7) | −12.1 (10.2) | −4.6 (23.7) | 0.3 (32.5) | −4.0 (24.8) | −12.0 (10.4) | −32.7 (−26.9) | −38.3 (−36.9) | −42.4 (−44.3) | −47.6 (−53.7) |
| Average precipitation mm (inches) | 3 (0.1) | 3 (0.1) | 5 (0.2) | 10 (0.4) | 27 (1.1) | 59 (2.3) | 95 (3.7) | 75 (3.0) | 39 (1.5) | 10 (0.4) | 6 (0.2) | 5 (0.2) | 337 (13.2) |
Source: Pogoda.ru.net
