= Titovskaya Sopka =

Mountain massif in Russia

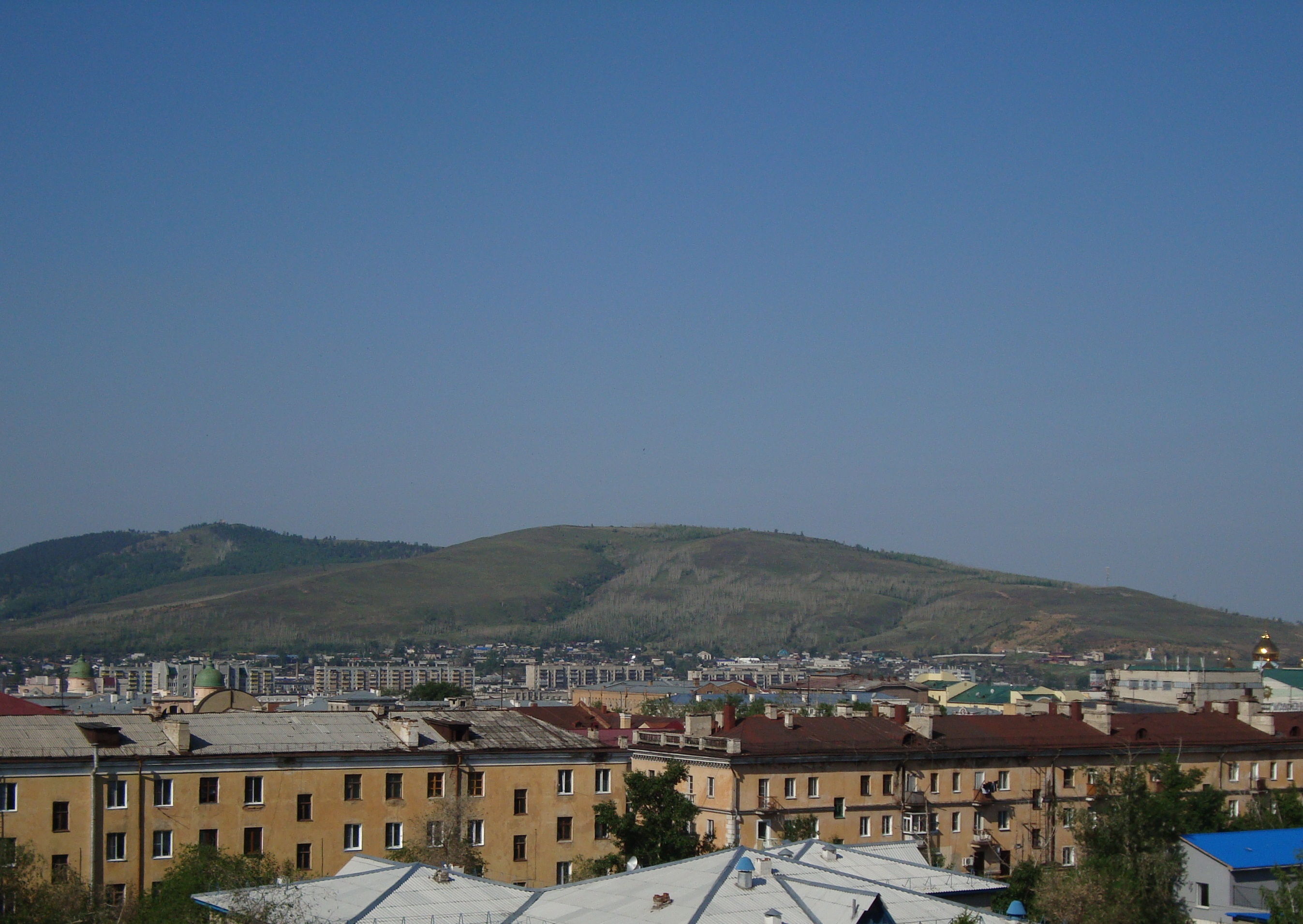
- Chita at the foot of Titovskaya Sopka

Highest point
- Elevation: 944.7 m (3,099 ft)
- Coordinates: 52°01′30″N 113°28′00″E

Geography
- Country: Russia
- Region: Zabaykalsky Krai
- Parent range: Chersky Range (Transbaikalia)

Geology
- Mountain type: Stratovolcano

Titovskaya Sopka is a mountain massif (max. elevation 944.7 m), a valuable natural-historical territory, a complex geological natural monument of local significance (paleontological, petrographic and geomorphological types according to the scientific classification of geological heritage objects). It is located on the southwestern outskirts of Chita, near the confluence of the Ingoda and Chitinka Rivers.

== Geographical description ==
Titovskaya Sopka is a Permian-Early Triassic stratovolcano of the Ingodin-Chita volcanic field. Titovskaya Sopka is characterized by explosive type of volcanic eruption, lavas of medium basic composition, flows of trachyte, trachyandesite, basalt, predominance of clastolavas of plugs with volcanic bombs, complete absence of slag and a large amount of loose tufa material.

The stratovolcano is mainly composed of trachyte, trachylliolite, trachyandesite flows, trachyte clastoflavas (up to 100 m wide flows) with rare horizons of basalts (up to 20 m wide flows) attributed to the Tamir series. In the southern rocky parts of Titov Sopka, clastoflavas with volcanic bombs up to 2 m in diameter predominate. Trachyriolite flows with vertical fluidity emphasizing lava movement in the volcano's feeding channel (over 50 m wide) have been established. There, among lava flows of black basalts (1.8 to 30 m wide), a pegmatite dike (7 m wide) and a body of syenite porphyry (18 m wide) that healed the volcano's parasitic plug are also noted. The eastern slopes consist of flows of trachybasalts and trachytes interlayered with clastoflavas and vitrocrystalline tuffs. The width of the flows is 5–10 m. On the left side of the Logovoy dip, the quarry is covered by trachybasalts with a plug made of syenite porphyries (width over 50 m). The peculiarity of the syenite porphyries is the mass development of various "fernlike" bushy dendrites of manganese and iron oxides, 20–30 cm in size, along the fractures, as well as many cracks, micro-fractures with displacement amplitude up to 20 cm. On the northern spurs of Titovskaya Sopka, horizons of yellow-gray massive tuffs with secondary bluish formations of vivianite type were found among trachyte clasts.Opposite the lookout point along the Moskovskiy Tract, another parasitic plug is exposed in the road quarry, healed by syenite porphyries.

In the southwestern part of the massif, along the steep escarpment above the rocky tributary of the Ingoda River, there is a contact — superposition of trachyte lavas on Paleozoic leucocratic granites. On the southern rocks there is an area of about 50 m high preserved basement terrace of the Praingoda with weak alluvium. The Ingoda River valley in the area of the southern slopes belongs to the antecedent type.

== Paleontological findings ==
In 1960-1963 M. P. Bezverkhny and M. B. Zvonkova found in sandy loam sediments on the northern outskirts of Titov Sopka the remains of mammoth tusks, a woolly rhinoceros elbow bone, and horse skeletal fragments dated to the Middle-Late Pleistocene. In 1967 E. I. Kornutova found a bison tooth in the area of the mill. In 1991 a student of the Mining Faculty of Transbaikal State University I. V. Kotelnikov found a bison tooth to the north of the mill. V. Kotelnikov collected numerous horse teeth on the northwestern outskirts of Titov Sopka. Paleontological findings of vertebrates are completely collected. Therefore, the paleontological monument Titovskaya Sopka belongs to the category of destroyed monuments and is included in the Geological Red Book of Transbaikalia.

== Archaeology ==
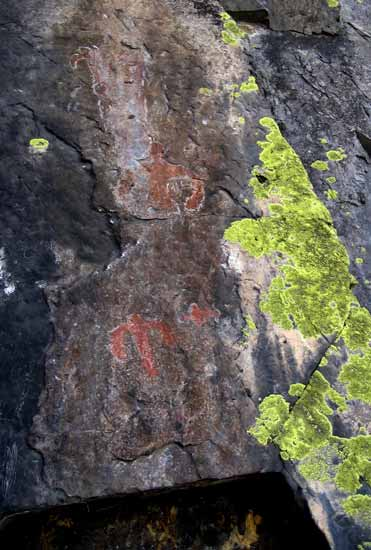
Petroglyphs on rocks on the bank of the Ingoda River

A. K. Kuznetsov, the director of the CHOCM, A. I. Makhalov, an employee of the museum, and E. I. Titov, an ethnologist and teacher, made the first collections of stone tools on Titovskaya Sopka. In 1950, A. P. Okladnikov collected ancient artifacts on the territory of the psychoneurological hospital. In 1952, he discovered and excavated a Stone Age workshop, which revealed a picture of harvesting and initial processing of stone raw materials. According to the definition of V. F. Petrun, the main type of raw material was microlavobreccia.

Since 1966, I. I. Kirillov has been studying the ancient settlements of Sukhotino. The most interesting is Sukhotino-4, where a number of culture remains with Upper Paleolithic dwellings were discovered in the sediments of the Sartanian glaciation. The inhabitants of the dwellings used stone, bone and liner tools. They hunted mammoth, rhinoceros, red and reindeer, bison, saiga, gazelle, blackbucks and others. They also found the shells of Asian ostrich eggs.

On the slopes of Titovskaya Sopka four sites with ancient rock paintings are known. The first two were discovered in the 1950s by A. P. Okladnikov, they are Titovskaya Sopka and Sokhatiny Kamen. Other monuments with ancient art are Sukhotino 13 and Gorge, burials from the Bronze Age to the Middle Ages are also known. Gold and silver objects were found in some of the burials. On the south-western slope of the mountain the Russian settlement Zasoposhnoye, inhabited in the late XVII - 1st half of the XIX century, was studied. According to P. S. Pallas, the inhabitants of the settlement built rafts for rafting on the Ingoda, Shilka and Amur rivers. There are remains of log houses, blacksmith's and potter's workshops in the settlement. Later, due to the erosion of the slopes, the settlement was moved to the neighboring Zasopka village.

The archaeological monuments of Titovskaya Sopka are constantly subjected to negligence on the part of local authorities, commercial enterprises and the population. Volunteers, scientists and students have been fighting for the preservation of unique archaeological and natural monuments for over 30 years.

Since the middle of May 2023 work has been started on the definition of a specially protected natural area, which should allow the creation of a tourist zone on the territory of Titovskaya Sopka. It is planned to create an ethno-archaeological park on the territory of the Sukhotino monument complex. For this purpose Sukhotino-4 will be cleared for the museumization of the Paleolithic residential complex. In addition, an ecological path for visitors will be created after the restoration. The open-air museum will function as a scientific and educational hostel.

== Historical events ==
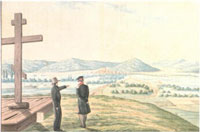
Sopka near Chita with the grave of an unknown soldier, a participant of the uprising of the Semyonovsky regiment.

Of special interest on Titovskaya Sopka is the terraced cellar cape on the northwestern slope, surrounded by the Moskovsky Tract. On the cape there was a grave of a convict soldier of the rebellious Semyonovsky Life Guards Regiment (1820). In 1827–30, the Decembrist M. S. Lunin erected a massive larch cross on the grave, which was depicted in watercolors by the Decembrist N. A. Bestuzhev and preserved until the 1860s.

In 1998, a cast-iron cross was consecrated at this place by Bishop Innokenty of Chita and Transbaikal. In 2002, the Chapel of St. Alexander Nevsky was erected at the place of the cross.

In 1906, on the slope of Titovskaya Sopka were shot the leaders of the Chita Republic A. A. Kosciuszko-Valyuzhanich (Grigorovich), I. A. Weinstein, E. V. Tsupsman, P. E. Stolyarov. In 1926 a monument was erected in memory of this tragic event.

== Current condition ==
The lower parts of the slopes of Titovskaya Sopka are occupied by the suburbs of Chita, the higher parts by potato fields. On the western slope there is the Chita cemetery No. 2. The forest on the hill has been largely cut down and artificial steppe has been created. In the 1960s there were attempts to replant the forest, which should be continued. Till 1993, Titov Sopka housed the plant collections of the Zabaykalsky Botanical Garden.

== Gallery ==
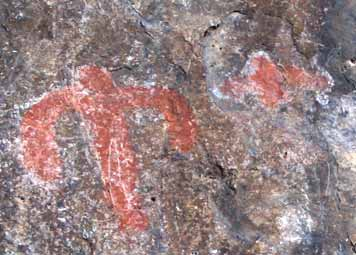
A picture of a zooanthropomorph

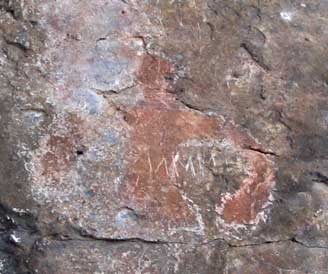
Anthropomorphic image

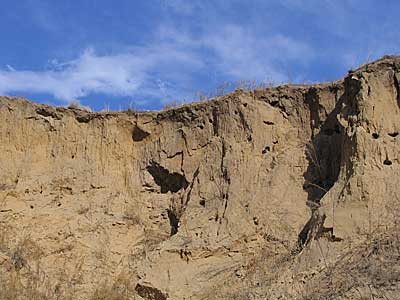
Excavation site of Sukhotino-4 settlement

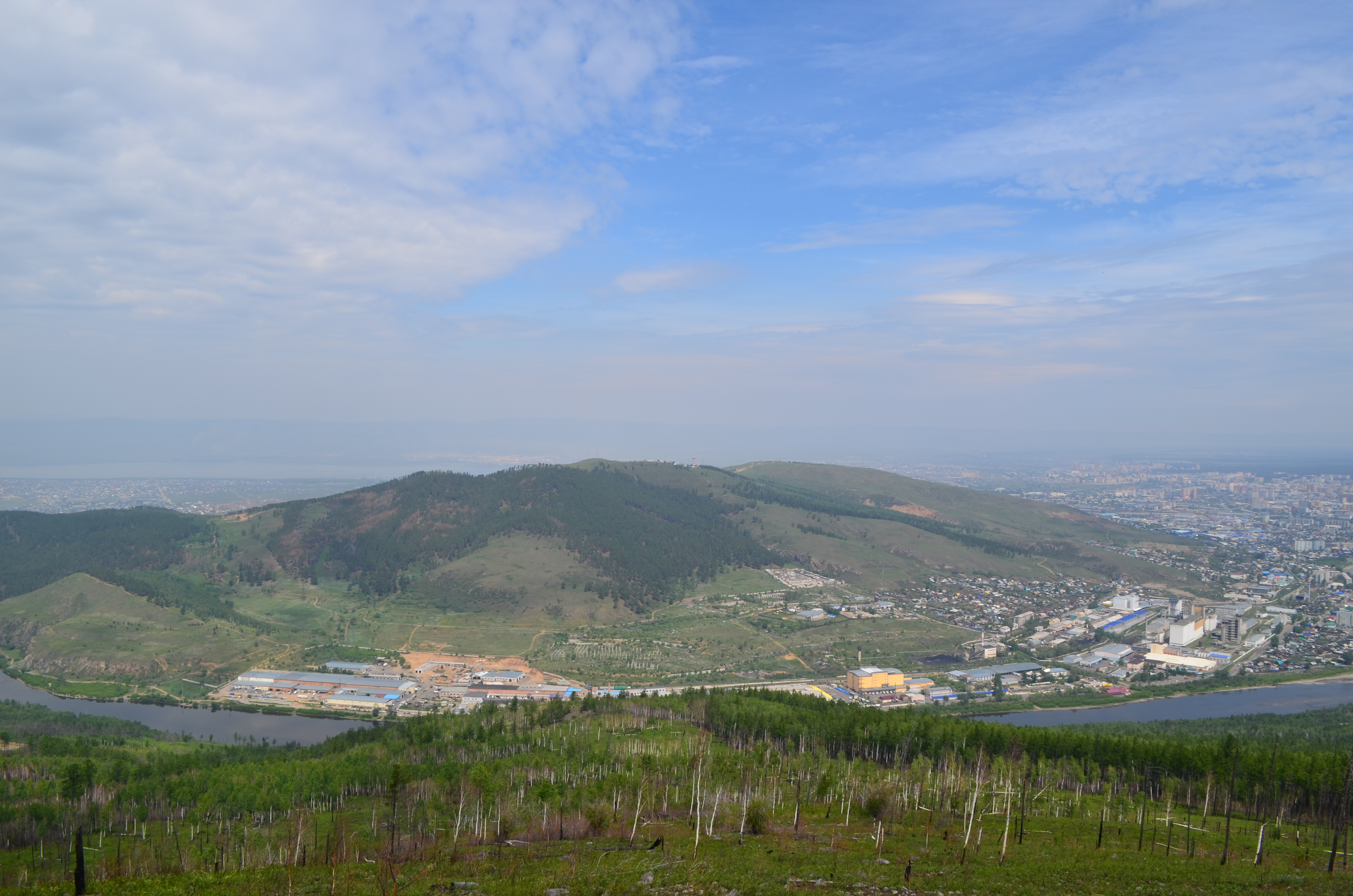
View of Titovskaya Sopka from the nameless hill 1045 m

== Titovskaya Sopka in culture ==
- Leonid Vorobyov's song "What's behind Titovskaya Sopka, Mother"

== Bibliography ==
- Титовская сопка. ez.chita.ru. Проект «Энциклопедия Забайкалья». Дата обращения: 19 January 2019. Archive: 24 September 2018.
- Паллас П.С. Путешествие по разным провинциям Российского государства. — СПб., 1778.
- Петрунь В.Ф. К петрофизической характеристике материала каменных орудий палеолита // Палеолит и неолит: материалы и исследования по археологии. — Л., 1971.
- Окладников А.П., Кириллов И.И. Юго-восточное Забайкалье в эпоху камня и ранней бронзы. — Новосибирск, 1980.
- Кириллов И.И., Каспаров А.К. Археология Забайкалья. Проблемы и перспективы: эпоха палеолита // Хроностратиграфия палеолита Северной, Центральной и Восточной Азии и Америки. — Новосибирск, 1990.
- Лапо А.В., Давыдов В.И., Пашкевич Н.Г. и др. Методические основы изучения геологических памятников России // Стратиграфия. Геологическая корреляция. — 1993.
- Константинов М.В. Каменный век восточного региона Байкальской Азии. — Улан-Удэ; Чита, 1994.
- Ковычев Е.В. Старорусские поселения Восточного Забайкалья // Славянская культура. Традиции и современность: материалы региональной научно-практической конференции. — Чита, 1995.
- Синица С.М., Мясников А.В., Ниживой М.Н. и др. Геологические аудитории под открытым небом (Титовская Сопка) // Ресурсы Забайкалья. — 2001.
- Природное наследие // Малая энциклопедия Забайкалья. — Новосибирск: Наука, 2009.
