= Taptanay =

Taptanay Таптанай
- Selo
- Location within Zabaykalsky Krai Location within Russia
- Coordinates: 50°46′N 113°48′E
- Country: Russia
- Region: Zabaykalsky Krai
- District: Duldurginsky District
- Time zone: UTC+9:00

Taptanay (Russian: Таптанай) is a rural locality (a selo) in Duldurginsky District, Zabaykalsky Krai, Russia. Population: 710 (2021 census); 794 (2010 census); 840 (2002 census); There are 4 streets in this selo.

== Geography ==
This rural locality is located 19 km from Duldurga (the district's administrative centre), 141 km from Chita (capital of Zabaykalsky Krai) and 5,386 km from Moscow. Ilya is the nearest rural locality.
