= Ivan-Arakhley Lake System =

Group of lakes near Chita, Russia

- Ивано-Арахлейские озёра
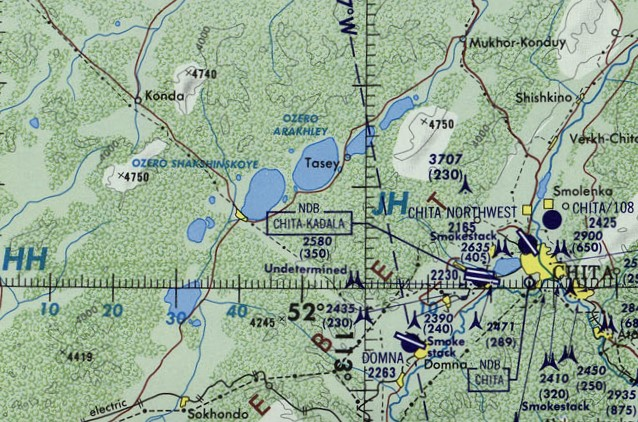
- Ivan-Arakhley Lake System map section

- Location in Zabaykalsky Krai, Russian Far East
- Location: Vitim Plateau, South Siberian System
- Coordinates: 52°12′N 112°52′E
- Basin countries: Zabaykalsky Krai, Russia
- Surface elevation: ca 965 m (3,166 ft)
- Frozen: October to May
- Islands: None

Ivan-Arakhley Lake System (Russian: Ивано-Арахлейские озёра) is a group of fresh water bodies in the Chita District, Zabaykalsky Krai, Russia. The villages of Arakhley, Tasei and Preobrazhenka are located near the lakes.

The lakes are a tourist attraction and there are holiday cottages and resorts near them. They are located within the Ivano-Arakhley State Natural Landscape Reserve (Zakaznik), a protected area of regional significance created in 1995, covering an area of 210,000 ha (520,000 acres).

== Geography ==
The lakes lie at the southeastern end of the Vitim Plateau. As a group, they are also known as "Beklemishev Lakes" (Russian: Беклеми́шевские озёра) since they stretch roughly from SW to NE for about 80 km (50 mi) along the Beklemishev Depression. "Chita Lakes" (Russian: Чити́нские озёра) is another alternative name, because the lakes lie very close to Chita, about 50 km (31 mi) to the west of the city.

The lake system includes 6 large lakes with a water surface of more than 10 km^{2} (3.9 sq mi): Arakhley, Shaksha, Irgen, Ivan, Tasei and Bolshoy Undugun. Arakhley is the largest of the group and is also the one having the greatest depth.

=== Hydrography ===
The system includes 20 smaller lakes with surface areas of roughly 1 km^{2} (0.39 sq mi) or less. Lakes Ivan and Tasei belong to the Lena basin. Arakhley, Shaksha, Bolshoy Undugun and Irgen are separated from them by a slight elevation and belong to the Baikal basin through the Khilok river, a tributary of the Selenga.

== See also ==
- List of lakes of Russia
- Yeravna-Khorga Lake System, a similar lake formation located about 100 km (62 mi) to the northwest, in Buryatia.
- Lake Kenon
