= Arakhley (lake) =

Lake of Zabaykalsky Krai

- Арахле́й / Арахира нуур
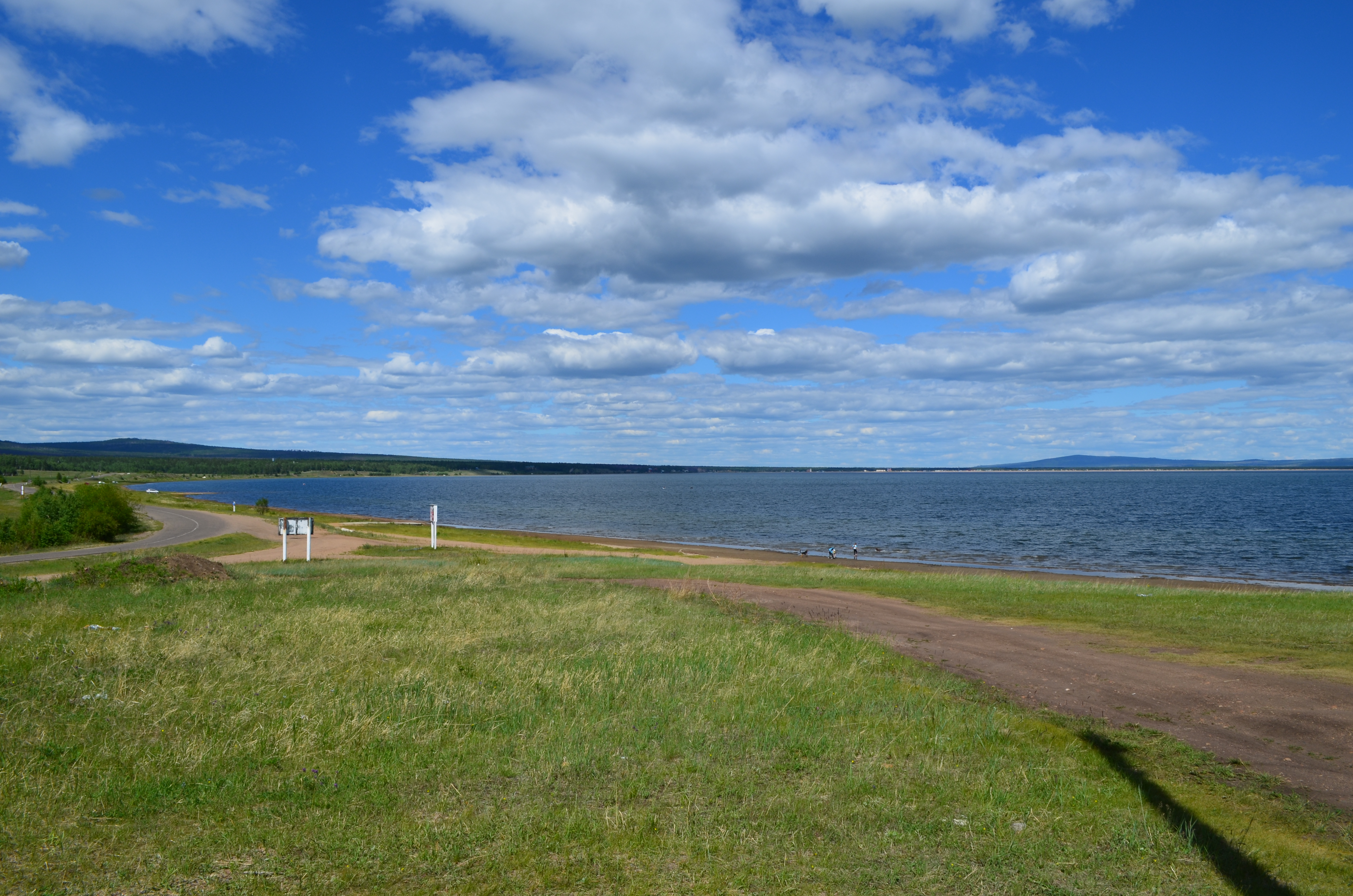
- Landscape of the Arakhley lakeshore

- Location in Zabaykalsky Krai, Russian Far East
- Location: Vitim Plateau, South Siberian System
- Coordinates: 52°12′10″N 112°52′30″E
- Primary inflows: Domka, Gryaznukha
- Primary outflows: Kholoy
- Catchment area: 242 km^{2} (93 sq mi)
- Basin countries: Zabaykalsky Krai, Russia
- Max. length: 10.8 km (6.7 mi)
- Max. width: 7 km (4.3 mi)
- Surface area: 58.5 km^{2} (22.6 sq mi)
- Average depth: 10 m (33 ft)
- Max. depth: 19.5 m (64 ft)
- Water volume: 0.61 km^{3} (0.15 cu mi)
- Surface elevation: 965 m (3,166 ft)
- Frozen: October to May
- Islands: None
- Settlements: Arakhley

Arakhley (Russian: Арахле́й; Buryat: Арахира нуур) is a fresh water body in the Chita District, Zabaykalsky Krai, Russia. It is the 208th lake in Russia in water surface. The villages of Arakhley and Preobrazhenka are located near the lakeshore. Arakhley is a locally well-known tourist destination and there are a number of resorts by the lake.

Lake Arakhley is located within the Ivano-Arakhley State Natural Landscape Reserve, a protected area of regional significance created in 1995, covering an area of 210,000 ha (520,000 acres).

== Geography ==
Arakhley lake has a roughly oval shape. It is located in the Beklemishev Depression, at the southeastern end of the Vitim Plateau, west of Chita, Zabaykalsky Krai and lake Kenon. It is separated from neighboring Lake Shaksha by a low, 1.2 km (0.75 mi) wide landspit.

It is part of the Ivan-Arakhley Lake System (Russian: Ивано-Арахлейские озёра), which includes 6 large lakes and about 20 smaller ones. Arakhley is the largest of the group and it is also the lake having the greatest depth.

There are two small rivers flowing into the lake, the Domka and the Gryaznukha, also known as Shaborta. The Kholoy stream flows out of the lake into Lake Shaksha. The 242 km^{2} (93 sq mi) catchment area of the lake belongs to the Khilok river basin, a tributary of the Selenga.

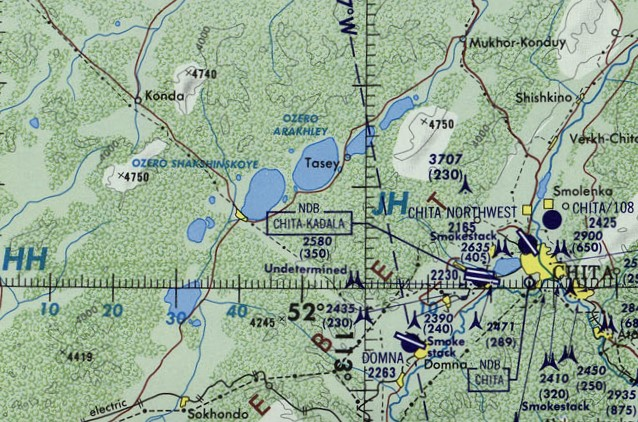
Ivan-Arakhley Lake System. Lake Arakhley is roughly in the middle.

== Flora and fauna ==
The lake is surrounded by larch taiga, interspersed with areas of forest steppe and meadows. In the waters there are aquatic plants.

The water of the lake is fresh and the main fish species in it are roach, perch, dace, pike, chebak, "bulus", minnow, crucian carp, peled, bream, carp and catfish. The fauna of the lake has suffered degradation in the past few decades and commercial fisheries have declined.

== See also ==
- List of lakes of Russia
