= Roman Kalinin =

Russian rapist and serial killer (born 1984)

- Born: Roman Sergeevich Kalinin; 1984 (age 41–42); RSFSR
- Conviction: Murder
- Penalty: Life imprisonment

Details
- Victims: 4
- Span of crimes: 2003–2009
- Country: Russia
- State: Zabaykalsky
- Date apprehended: 23 June 2009

Roman Sergeevich Kalinin (Russian: Роман Сергеевич Калинин; born 1984) is a Russian rapist and serial killer who operated in the Chitinsky District of the Zabaykalsky Krai, killing four people between 2003 and 2009.

== Biography ==
=== Life before the murders ===
Roman Kalinin was born in 1984 in Chita. After graduating from school, he received higher education at the Transbaikal Institute of Railway Transport and was then called up for military service in the Russian army. After his service, Kalinin returned to Chita, where he found work as an assistant train driver. He was not married, had no children, and had no criminal record. He loved promiscuity, In his free time from work, he generally led an idle lifestyle. In his late youth, Kalinin spent a lot of time in the company of his peer Denis Redrov, who in the mid-2000s became an employee of the "Russian Ministry of Defense."

=== Murders ===
On the night of 21 June 2003, Kalinin and his acquaintance Denis Redrov were resting in the Chita café "Gan Bay", where they met two schoolgirls. They lured one of the girls to the Memorial Park of the Fighting and Labor Glory of the Trans-Baikal Region, where she was raped and killed. Kalinin and Redrov then brought the other girl to the park and killed her because they feared that she could inform the police about the crime that they had committed. They dealt with both victims with particular cruelty: first they beat the girls with their hands, feet and glass bottles, and then smashed their heads with a cobblestone. After the second murder, they decided to simulate robberies on the victims: they took gold jewellery, a pager, and a cosmetic bag from the girls' corpses and then threw their bodies into the Chitinka.

In the summer of 2009, Kalinin met with a female student in Chita and invited her to a vacation outside the city. The student took a friend with her on the trip. On 17 June, the three of them arrived by train at the Glubokaya Pad station, from which they reached the dacha cooperative Lokomotiv-82. At one of the abandoned dachas, Kalinin raped and killed his new acquaintance, smashing her head. Before this, he lured her friend into the nearest forest (under the pretext of “collecting firewood for a fire”), where he also killed her, hacking her to death with an axe. He took off the gold ornaments, broke their cellphones, and disposed of them in the forest.

=== Arrest, investigation and trial ===
On 19 June, the Railway Police Department received a statement about the two missing girls. On 23 June, the main suspect in the murders, Kalinin, was detained. According to his testimony on 25 June, operatives detained at Yekaterinburg's airport the accomplice to the first murders, Redrov, and then brought him back to Chita. Both soon acknowledged their guilt.

On 4 February 2010, the Trans-Baikal Regional Court sentenced Roman Kalinin to life imprisonment in a correctional special regime colony, while Redrov was given 19 years of imprisonment in a corrective labour colony. In addition, the court ordered both convicts to pay compensation to the victims' families for more than 1.3 million rubles. While still in pretrial detention, Kalinin married so that his wife could legally visit him in the prison colony for life-sentenced prisoners, including during "long-term visits." In may of that year, the Supreme Court of Russia upheld the verdict without changes, and cassation appeals rapists were rejected.

== See also ==
- List of Russian serial killers
