= Tokchin =

Tokchin Токчин
- Selo
- Location within Zabaykalsky Krai Location within Russia
- Coordinates: 50°30′N 114°08′E
- Country: Russia
- Region: Zabaykalsky Krai
- District: Duldurginsky District
- Time zone: UTC+9:00

Tokchin (Russian: Токчин) is a rural locality (a selo) in Duldurginsky District, Zabaykalsky Krai, Russia. Population: 1,111 (2021 census); 1,210 (2010 census); 1,151 (2002 census); There are 5 streets in this selo.

== Geography ==
This rural locality is located 42 km from Duldurga (the district's administrative centre), 175 km from Chita (capital of Zabaykalsky Krai) and 5,442 km from Moscow. Tut-Khaltuy is the nearest rural locality.
