= Alkhanay =

Alkhanay Алханай
- Selo
- Location within Zabaykalsky Krai Location within Russia
- Coordinates: 50°43′N 113°28′E
- Country: Russia
- Region: Zabaykalsky Krai
- District: Duldurginsky District
- Time zone: UTC+9:00

Alkhanay (Russian: Алханай) is a rural locality (a selo) in Duldurginsky District, Zabaykalsky Krai, Russia. Population: 919 (2021 census); 1.140 (2010 census); 1,101 (2002 census); There are 21 streets in this selo.

== Geography ==
This rural locality is located 10 km from Duldurga (the district's administrative centre), 145 km from Chita (capital of Zabaykalsky Krai) and 5,368 km from Moscow. Duldurga is the nearest rural locality.
