= Krasnoyarovo, Duldurginsky District, Zabaykalsky Krai =

Krasnoyarovo Красноярово
- Selo
- Location within Zabaykalsky Krai Location within Russia
- Coordinates: 50°57′N 113°31′E
- Country: Russia
- Region: Zabaykalsky Krai
- District: Duldurginsky District
- Time zone: UTC+9:00

Krasnoyarovo (Russian: Красноярово) is a rural locality (a selo) in Duldurginsky District, Zabaykalsky Krai, Russia. Population: 195 (2021 census); 202 (2010 census); 230 (2002 census); There are 3 streets in this selo.

== Geography ==
This rural locality is located 32 km from Duldurga (the district's administrative centre), 120 km from Chita (capital of Zabaykalsky Krai) and 5,343 km from Moscow. Balzino is the nearest rural locality.
