= Uzon, Zabaykalsky Krai =

Uzon Узон
- Selo
- Location within Zabaykalsky Krai Location within Russia
- Coordinates: 50°34′N 113°36′E
- Country: Russia
- Region: Zabaykalsky Krai
- District: Duldurginsky District
- Time zone: UTC+9:00

Uzon (Russian: Узон) is a rural locality (a selo) in Duldurginsky District, Zabaykalsky Krai, Russia. Population: 1,037 (2021 census); 1,167 (2010 census); 1,183 (2002 census); There are 3 streets in this selo.

== Geography ==
This rural locality is located 11 km from Duldurga (the district's administrative centre), 162 km from Chita (capital of Zabaykalsky Krai) and 5,396 km from Moscow. Duldurga is the nearest rural locality.
