= Avdey, Russia =

Avdey Авдей
- Village
- Location within Zabaykalsky Krai Location within Russia
- Coordinates: 52°22′N 113°38′E
- Country: Russia
- Region: Zabaykalsky Krai
- District: Chitinsky District
- Time zone: UTC+9:00

Avdey (Russian: Авдей) is a rural locality (a selo) in Shishkinskoye Rural Settlement of Chitinsky District, Zabaykalsky Krai, Russia. The population was 179 as of 2010. There are 7 streets.

== Geography ==
The village is located on the right bank of the Chita River, 46 km north of Chita (the district's administrative centre) by road. Shishkino is the nearest rural locality.

== Ethnicity ==
The village is inhabited by Buryats, Russians.
