= Ilya, Zabaykalsky Krai =

Ilya Иля
- Selo
- Location within Zabaykalsky Krai Location within Russia
- Coordinates: 50°50′N 113°35′E
- Country: Russia
- Region: Zabaykalsky Krai
- District: Duldurginsky District
- Time zone: UTC+9:00

Ilya (Russian: Иля) is a rural locality (a selo) in Duldurginsky District, Zabaykalsky Krai, Russia. Population: 253 (2021 census); 316 (2010 census); 390 (2002 census); There are 5 streets in this selo.

== Geography ==
This rural locality is located 18 km from Duldurga (the district's administrative centre), 133 km from Chita (capital of Zabaykalsky Krai) and 5,363 km from Moscow. Krasnoyarovo is the nearest rural locality.
