= Aleksandr Perfilyev =

Russian writer (1895-1973)

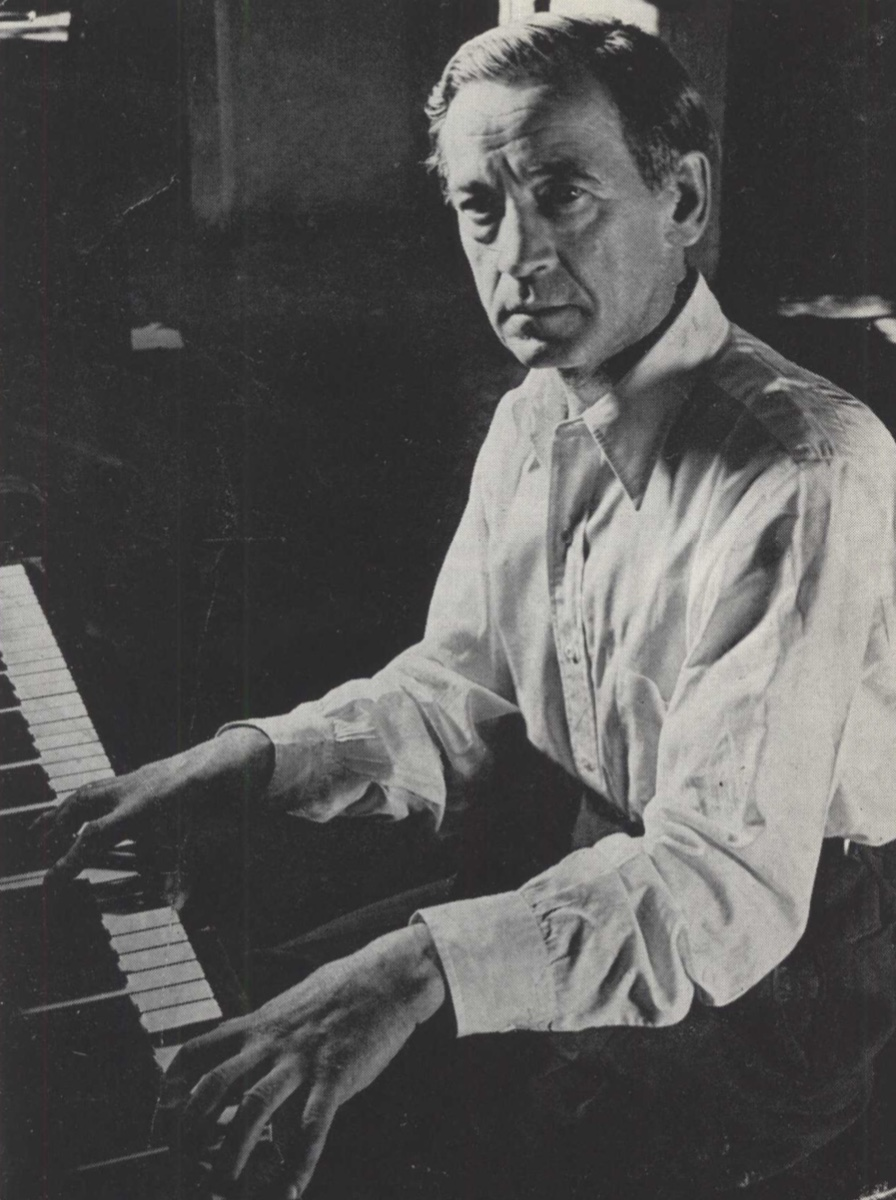
- Born: Aleksander Mikhailovich Perfilyev; September 19, 1895; Chita, Transbaikal Oblast, Russian Empire
- Died: February 26, 1973 (aged 77); Munich, West Germany
- Education: Orenburg Cossack School
- Occupations: Writer; journalist; poet; lyricist
- Writing career
- Pen name: Alexander Lee, Sherry Brandy, L. Gantimurov
- Period: 1915-1973

Aleksandr Mikhailovich Perfilyev (Russian: Александр Михайлович Перфильев; 19 September 1895 – 26 February 1973) was a Russian émigré novelist, journalist, poet, and lyricist.

== Biography ==
He was born into the Cossack family of Imperial Russian Army General Mikhail Apollonovich Perfilyev in Chita, Russian Empire, on 19 September 1895. He joined the Second St. Petersburg Cadet Corps before transferring to the Orenburg Cossack School in 1909. After graduating, he served in the First Nerchinsk Cossack Regiment under his father and the Guards Combined Cossack Company during World War I. He was awarded the Cross of St. George and was promoted to the rank of yesaul. He published his first poems in the newspaper Petrogradsky Listok in 1915 and then in the magazines Solntse Rossii, Ogonyok, and Niva.

Soon after the Russian Civil War, Perfilyev was arrested on the charges of aiding counterrevolutionary organizations and spent a year in prison. After paying for his ransom, he lived in exile in Riga, Latvia, in 1921. In Riga, Perfilyev published in the newspapers Rizhsky Kurier and Russkaya Zhizn and in the magazines Nash Ogonyok, Russkoye Slovo, and Novaya Niva. He also created Russian lyrics for the Kazanova publishing house under composer Oskar Strock. He married, following the death of his wife and daughter, novelist and journalist Irina Saburova. In Riga, Aleksander Perfilyev published Snow Mass, Listopad, Wind from the North, and A Man Without Memories.

Following the Soviet occupation of Latvia, the Soviet government ended all printed publications by White émigré writers, resulting in Perfilyev going into hiding and being employed as a night watchman. He published A Man Without Memories and edited for Russian-language newspapers during the German occupation of Latvia. In October of 1944, Perfilyev and Saburova fled Riga to Berlin with retreating German troops from Kurzeme.

In Berlin, he enlisted in the Cossack divisions of Pyotr Krasnov and was sent to northern Italy, then to Prague, where he was captured and sentenced to death by Soviet soldiers. He managed to escape the firing squad and crossed the demarcation line into Bavaria, which was occupied by American troops. He first settled in the Bavarian town of Mühldorf until he moved to Munich, where he would live for the rest of his life. Aleksander Perfilyev died on the 26 February 1973. Irina Saburova posthumously published "The Literary Heritage of A. M. Perfiliev (Alexander Lee)" and Poems.

== Publishing history ==
Poetry collections

- (Riga, 1925) Snow Mass: Poems
- (Riga, 1929) Listopad: Second Book of Poems published by the Salamandra Publishing House
- (Riga, 1937) Wind from the North published by the Filin Publishing House
- (Riga, 1942) A Man Without Memories
- (Munich, 1976) Poems published by Irina Saburova

Collected works

- (Munich, 1947) When the Snow Burns
- (Munich, 1973) "The Literary Heritage of A. M. Perfiliev (Alexander Lee)"

Songs

- (1928) "Oh, Those Black Eyes" by Oskar Strock
- (1930) "Blue Eyes" by Oskar Strock
