= Molokovka =

Molokovka (Russian: Молоковка) is the name of several rural localities in Russia:

- Molokovka, Ivanovo Oblast, a village in Kineshemsky District of Ivanovo Oblast; 57°23′N 42°31′E
- Molokovka, Zabaykalsky Krai, a settlement in Chitinsky District of Zabaykalsky Krai
