= Irgen =

Irgen Иргень
- Selo
- Location within Zabaykalsky Krai Location within Russia
- Coordinates: 51°58′N 112°34′E
- Country: Russia
- Region: Zabaykalsky Krai
- District: Chitinsky District
- Time zone: UTC+9:00

Irgen (Russian: Иргень) is a rural locality (a selo) in Chitinsky District, Zabaykalsky Krai, Russia. Population: 352 (2021 census); 433 (2010 census); There are 6 streets in this selo.

== Geography ==
This rural locality is located 63 km from Chita (the district's administrative centre and capital of Zabaykalsky Krai) and 5,151 km from Moscow. Yagodny is the nearest rural locality.
