= Zasopka =

Zasopka Засопка
- Selo
- Location within Zabaykalsky Krai Location within Russia
- Coordinates: 52°00′N 113°24′E
- Country: Russia
- Region: Zabaykalsky Krai
- District: Chitinsky District
- Time zone: UTC+9:00

Zasopka (Russian: Засопка) is a rural locality (a selo) in Chitinsky District, Zabaykalsky Krai, Russia. Population: 5,504 (2021 census); 3,599 (2010 census); There are 120 streets in this selo.

== Geography ==
This rural locality is located 6 km from Chita (the district's administrative centre and capital of Zabaykalsky Krai) and 5,204 km from Moscow. Kadala is the nearest rural locality.
