= Transbaikal Oblast =

Administrative unit of the Russian Empire (1851-1917/1920-1922)

Transbaikal Oblast Забайкальская область (Russian)
- Oblast of the Russian Empire
- 1851–1922
- Coat of arms

- Transbaikal Oblast within the Russian Empire
- Capital: Nerchinsk, then Chita
- Area
- 613,000 km^{2} (237,000 sq mi)
- Population
  - 1897: 672,037
- History
  - Established: 1851
  - Disestablished: 1922
Preceded by	Succeeded by
Irkutsk Governorate	Transbaikal Governorate
- Today part of: Buryatia, Zabaykalsky Krai

The Transbaikal Oblast (Russian: Забайкальская область) was a province (oblast) of the Russian Empire, in what is now Buryatia and Zabaykalsky Krai. The oblast was created out of the territory of the Irkutsk Governorate in 1851, and was dissolved in 1917, it was briefly re-established from 1920 to 1922 before it was succeeded by the Transbaikal Governorate.

== Geography ==
The Transbaikal oblast was located in Eastern Siberia, to the south and east of Lake Baikal. Internally it bordered the Irkutsk Governorate to the west and north— separated mostly by Lake Baikal— to the northeast by Yakutsk Oblast and to the east by the Amur Oblast. To the south it bordered the Qing dynasty and later Mongolia and the Republic of China.

== History ==
The Russians first explored Transbaikalia in 1639, when Maksim Perfilyev sailed up the Vitim River up to the mouth of the Tsipa. In 1647, Ivan Pokhabov crossed Lake Baikal and, being friends with the Mongols, explored to Urga. A year later, a proper settlement of the region was founded when the Barguzin fortress was founded, collecting tribute (yasak) from the Tungusic peoples in the region. In 1654 the Nerchinsk fortress was founded, 4 years later it was moved to the mouth of the Nercha and the city of Nerchinsk was founded. In 1665, Selenginsk was founded, followed by Verkhneudinsk the next year. By the end of the 17th century, there were 3 cities and 9 fortresses (ostrogs) in the region. Transbaikalia from the start of its settlement served often as a place of exile.

According to the Supreme Decree presented to the Governing Senate on 11 July 1851, the Transbaikal Oblast, consisting of two districts — Verkhneudinsk and Nerchinsky was separated from the Irkutsk Governorate and became its own region (oblast), while Chita was elevated to a city of regional significance. The Frontier Cossacks, consisting of the Transbaikal City cossack Regiment, the village Cossacks, the Tungus and Buryat regiments as well as the population who lived in the border strip made up the Baikal Cossacks of the Transbaikal Cossack Host, which was obliged to field 600 cavalry regiments. In 1884, the region, previously subservient to the General Government of East Siberia, was re-assigned to the General Governorate of Amur, later it would be transferred again on March 17, 1906 to the General Governorate of Irkutsk. It was abolished in 1917 with the Russian Revolution but was re-established under the Far Eastern Republic in 1920, 2 years later it was abolished again and succeeded by the Transbaikal Governorate, which would later be abolished in 1926.

== Administrative Divisions ==
The region was headed by a military governor, whose position was combined with the positions of the commander of the troops and the chief Ataman. The Cossack villages were distributed among three military departments, whose atamans supervised the regular serving of military service by the Cossacks. stanitsas were subordinated not to atamans, but to (civilian) county chiefs. The Chita district was the most complex, consisting of Cossack villages (stanitsas), peasant volosts, and nomad steppe dumas.

№	District	District capital	Coat of arms of the district capital	Area in km²	Population in 1897
1	Akshinskiy district	Aksha	size=	35,000	34,884
2	Barguzin district	Barguzin	size=	148,510	25,474
3	Verkhneudinsk district	Verkhneudinsk	size=	94,575	167,876
4	Nerchinsk district	Nerchinsk	size=	38,182	94,334
5	Nerchinsky-Zavod district	Nerchinsky Zavod	size=	100,690	75,737
6	Selenginsk district	Selenginsk	size=	46,460	102,158
7	Troitskosavask district	Troitskosavsk	size=	19,175	32,807
8	Chita district	Chita	size	112,746	138,767

=== Independent cities ===
№	City	Population (1897)	Subordinate to	Coat of arms
1	Mysovsk	1,500	Selenginsk district	size=
2	Sretensk	1,400	Nerchinsk district	size=

=== List of military governors ===
Name	Title and/or rank	Term
Pavel Ivanovich Zapolsky	Major general	28 Oct, 1851 — 9 Aug, 1855
Mikhail Semenovich Korsakov	Major general	14 December 1855 — 16 May 1860
Evgeny Mikhailovich Zhukovsky	Major general and lieutenant general	16 May 1860 — 11 Sep, 1863
Nikolai Petrovich Dietmar	Major general	2 February 1864 — 19 April 1874
Ivan Konstantinovich Pedashenko	Major general and lieutenant general	29 May 1874 — 18 April 1880
Luka Ivanovich Illyashevich	Major general	18 April 1880 — 15 Mar, 1884
Yakov Dedorovich Barabash	Major general	24 June 1884 — 6 February 1888
Mikhail Pavlovich Khoroshkhin	Major general	22 Feb, 1888 — 16 May 1893
Evgeniy Iosifovich Matsievskiy	Major general and lieutenant general	27 May 1893 — 7 April 1901
Ivan Pavlovich Nadarov	Lieutenant general	9 May 1901 — 5 July 1904
Ivan Vasilyevich Kholshchevnikov	Lieutenant general	5 July 1904 — 23 February 1906
Arkady Valerianovich Sychevsky	Major general	23 Feb, 1906 — 22 Aug, 1906
Mikhail Isaevich Ebelov	Lieutenant general	25 October 1906 — 1 Jan, 1910
Vasily Ivanovich Kosov	Lieutenant general	23 Jan, 1910 — 23 Mar, 1912
Andrei Ivanovich Kiyashko	Major general	23 Mar, 1912 — Feb 1917

=== Vice-governors and chairmen of the regional government (college) ===
Name	Title and/or rank	Term
Apollon Davydovich Lokhvitsky	Collegial councilor	6 February 1859 — 18 September 1861
Nikolai Nikolaevich Annekov	Collegial councilor	18 September 1861 — 1 December 1861
Aleksandr Aleksandrovich Mordvinov	Collegial councilor	16 May 1863 — 12 September 1869
Vladislav Kasperovich Zhelbetr	State councilor	27 Mar, 1870 — 24 Sep, 1874
Mikhail Nikolaevich Berestov	State councilor (acting)	26 Oct, 1874 — 16 Nov, 1880
Nikolai Petrovich Zalessky	State councilor (acting)	16 Nov, 1880 — 26 July 1885
Grigory Ivanovich Semyonov	State councilor (acting)	26 Jul, 1885 — 19 Oct, 1889
Leonty Karlovich Kube	State councilor (acting)	19 Oct, 1889 — 24 Mar, 1894
Nikolai Fedorovich Nitskevich	State councilor	24 Mar, 1894 — 26 Aug, 1898
Yakov Dmitrievich Gologovsky	Collegial councilor	10 Sep, 1898 — 30 May 1902
German Karlovich Vilken	State councilor	30 May 1902 — 27 Oct, 1903
Nikolai Pavlovich Belomestnov	State councilor	27 Oct, 1903 — 5 Feb, 1906
Ignatovich	Lieutenant colonel	16 Feb, 1906 — 17 Jun, 1906
Aleksandr Konstantinovich Miller	State councilor (acting)	17 Jun, 1906 — 31 Dec, 1908
Nikolai Pavlovich Belomestnov	State councilor (acting)	31 Dec, 1908 — 26 June 1911
Mikhail Ivanovich Izmailov	State councilor (acting)	26 Jun, 1911 — 1914
Aleksandr Petrovich Naryshkin	State councilor (acting)	1914 — 1917

== Demographics ==
There were 590,000 inhabitants in 1892, including 303,200 men. The predominance of men is explained by the annual influx of free and exiled migrants, thanks to this same migration, the population growth of the Transbaikal oblast was slightly higher than the population growth of the empire. The population was mostly located in 7 cities: Barguzin, Selenginsk, Troitskosavsk, Verkhneudinsk, Chita, Nerchinsk and Aksha, with another 750 settlements as well. Cossacks numbered 177,000, or 30.5% of the total population, while peasants numbered 166,000, 28.9% of the total population and foreigners numbered 170,000 (29%). The rest of the population was made up of townspeople, troops, convicts and exiled people, at 4% of the population. Curiously, almost the entire peasant population and more than ^{4}/_{5} of all Cossacks were Old Believers. Outside of Christianity, Lama Buddhism was the most widespread, whose adherents were mostly Buryats and the Tungus, shamanism was also practiced. By 1860 there were 157 Buddhist and shamanic temples, by the modern day this number decreased by ^{2}/_{3}. The border was guarded by the cossacks, while the peasant population tended to live along the river valleys of rivers like Dzhida, Chikoya, Khilka, Onon and Argun.

=== Ethnic composition and population in 1897 ===
The population according to the 1897 census was 672,037, consisting of 342,543 men and 329,494 women. Of these, Orthodox Christians numbered 443,009, Buddhists numbered 174,227, and Old Believers numbered 36,623. The urban population was 42,778.

District	Russians	Buryats	Evenks	Jews	Malorussians	Mongols	Belorussians	Chinese
Total	65.1%	26.7%	4.5%	1.2%	…	…	…	…
Aksha district	86.8%	9.8%	1.8%	…	…	1.0%	…	…
Barguzin district	40.6%	44.9%	8.3%	4.7%	…	…	…	…
Verkhneudinsk district	65.0%	31.8%	…	1.2%	…	…	1.1%	…
Nerchinsk district	94.5%	…	…	1.6%	…	…	…	1.4%
Nerchinsky-Zavod district	97.0%	…	…	…	…	…	…	…
Selenginsk district	37.3%	59.6%	1.6%	…	…	…	…	…
Troitskosavsk district	66.4%	32.8%	…	…	…	…	…	…
Chita district	47.1%	28.2%	18.2%	1.4%	2.8%	…	…	…
