= Ookteechenskaia =

Siberian village

Ookteechenskaia (Russian: Уктыченская, romanized: Uktychenskaya, also referred to as Ookteechenskaia-on-Shilka) was a remote village located in the Transbaikal region of Russia in Siberia.
