= Kenon (disambiguation) =

Kenon may refer to:

- Kenon, a lake in Transbaikalia, Russian Far East
- Larry Kenon (born 1952), an American basketball player
- Kenon Holdings, a public corporation
