= Kenon =

Lake of Zabaykalsky Krai

- Кенон
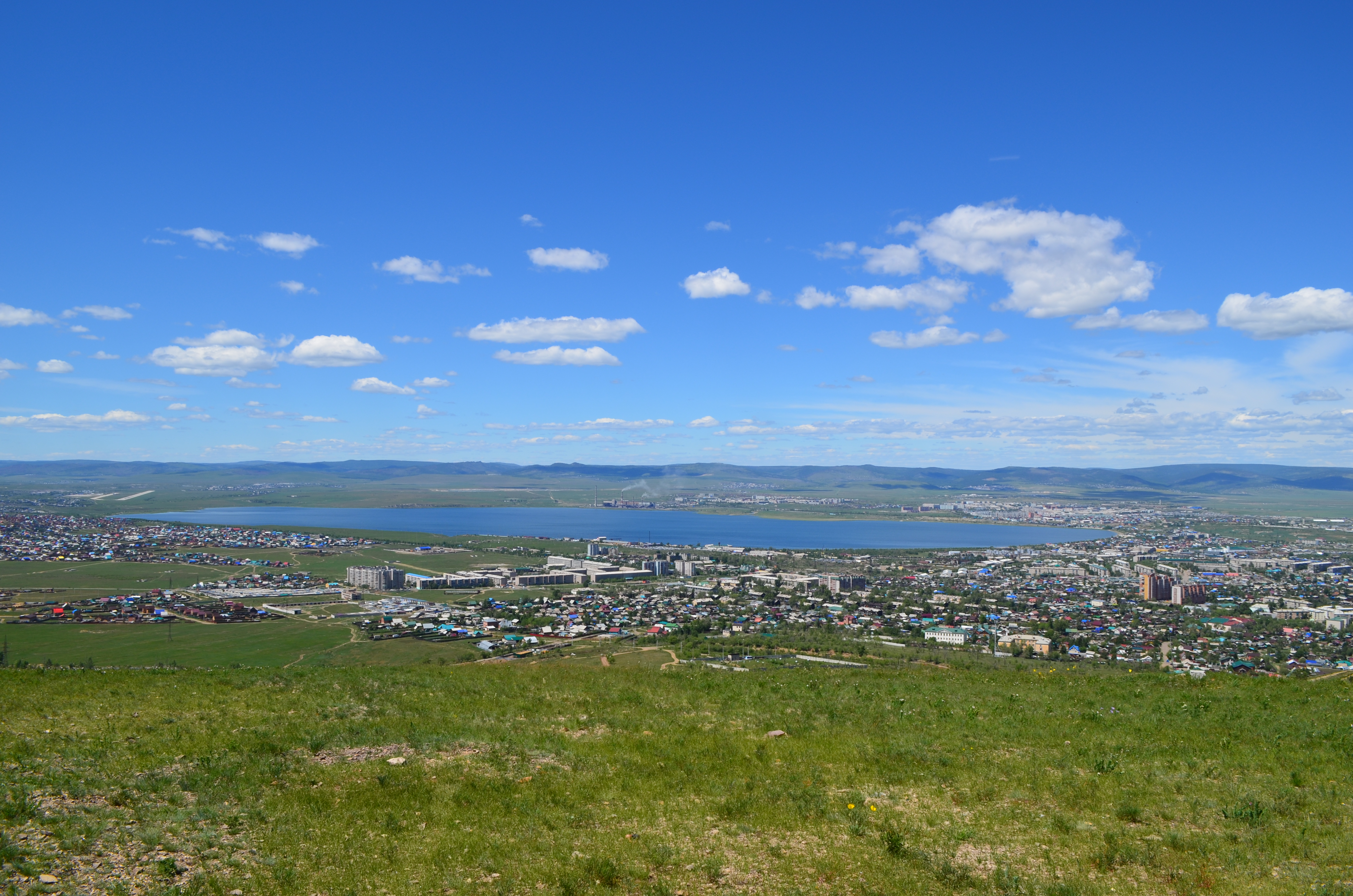
- Landscape of Kenon lake from the Titovskaya Sopka range

- Location in Zabaykalsky Krai, Russian Far East
- Coordinates: 52°02′19″N 113°22′50″E
- Primary inflows: Ivanovka, Kadala
- Catchment area: 227 km^{2} (88 sq mi)
- Basin countries: Zabaykalsky Krai, Russia
- Max. length: 5.7 km (3.5 mi)
- Max. width: 2.8 km (1.7 mi)
- Surface area: 16 km^{2} (6.2 sq mi)
- Max. depth: 6.8 m (22 ft)
- Surface elevation: 653 m (2,142 ft)
- Frozen: October to May
- Islands: None
- Settlements: Chita

Kenon (Russian: Кенон) is a fresh water body in the Chita District, Zabaykalsky Krai, Russia. The name of the lake originated in the Evenki language.

The city of Chita is located near the lakeshore and lake Kenon is surrounded by residential areas, railways, highways and agricultural land. There is also a rather narrow city beach zone which is popular in the summer, although there is substantial pollution. Neolithic and Bronze Age archaeological remains were found by the shores of the lake.

== Geography ==
Kenon lake is part of the Ingoda river basin, It is located in the Chita-Ingoda Depression (Читино-Ингодинская впадина), in the western outskirts of Chita, Zabaykalsky Krai. A few small streams flow into the lake. The main ones are the Ivanovka and Kadala rivers, which have their sources in the neighboring Yablonovy Range. The outflow is through a 2 km (1.2 mi) long channel leading to the Ingoda that fills with water only in the wettest years.

The lake is frozen between late October and early May.

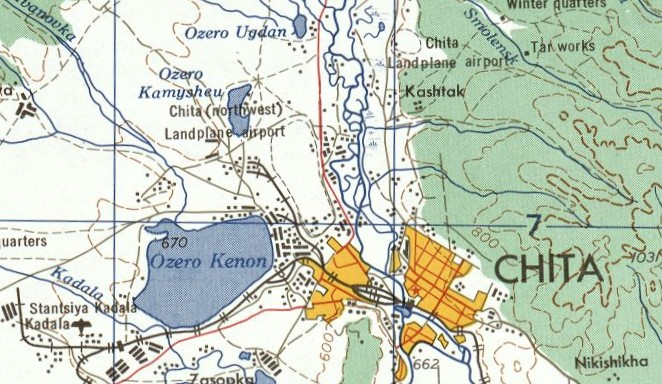
Lake Kenon and Chita City map section.

== Fauna ==
Among the fish species present in the lake, the main ones are perch, Amur chebak, Amur pike, goldfish, Amur carp and Amur catfish.

== See also ==
- List of lakes of Russia
- Ivan-Arakhley Lake System, located to the west
