= Arakhley =

Rural locality in Chitinsky District, Zabaykalsky Krai, Russia

Coordinates: 52°09′N 112°50′E

Arakhley (Russian: Арахлей) is a rural locality (a selo) in Chitinsky District of Zabaykalsky Krai, located on the southwest bank of Arakhley Lake, 93 kilometers (58 mi) from Chita. Population: 306 (2002).

There are many tourist attractions nearby. A monument to the residents of Arakhley who died in Great Patriotic War is located in the village.
