= Preobrazhenka, Zabaykalsky Krai =

Preobrazhenka Преображенка
- Selo
- Location within Zabaykalsky Krai Location within Russia
- Coordinates: 51°00′N 113°00′E
- Country: Russia
- Region: Zabaykalsky Krai
- District: Chitinsky District
- Time zone: UTC+9:00

Preobrazhenka (Russian: Преображенка) is a rural locality (a selo) in Chitinsky District, Zabaykalsky Krai, Russia. Population: 119 (2021 census); 124 (2010 census); There are 20 streets in this selo.

== Geography ==
This rural locality is located 50 km from Chita (the district's administrative centre and capital of Zabaykalsky Krai) and 5,139 km from Moscow. Arakhley is the nearest rural locality.
