= Chersky Range (Transbaikalia) =

Mountain range in Zabaykalsky Krai, Russia

- Хребет Черского
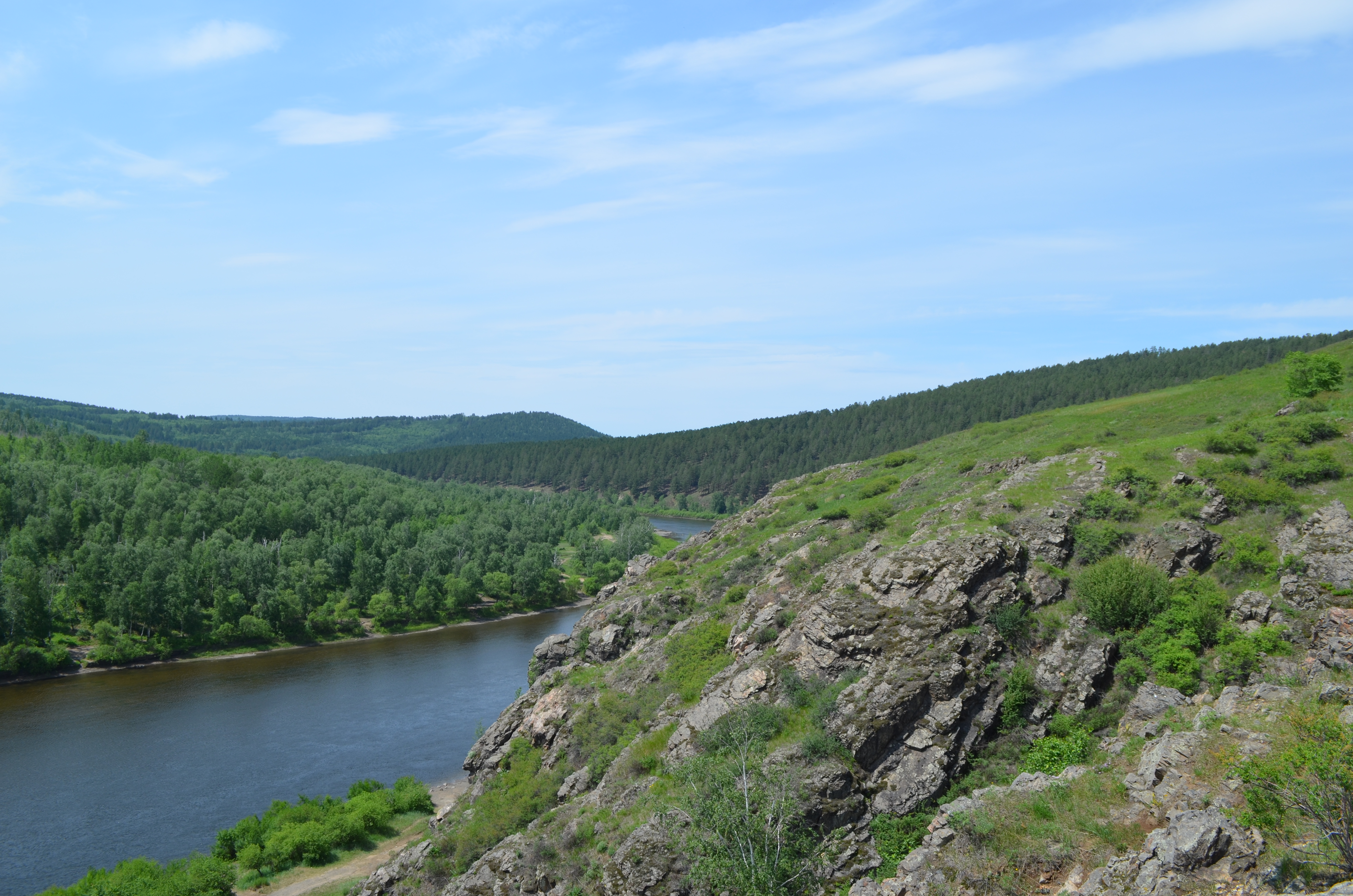
- The Sukhotino rocks rising above the Ingoda River

Highest point
- Peak: Golets Chingikhan
- Elevation: 1,644 m (5,394 ft)
- Coordinates: 52°46′43″N 114°29′14″E

Dimensions
- Length: 650 km (400 mi) NE/SW
- Width: 50 km (31 mi) SE/NW

Geography
- Location within Zabaykalsky Krai
- Country: Russia
- Krai: Zabaykalsky Krai
- Range coordinates: 52°10′N 113°50′E
- Parent range: South Siberian System

Geology
- Rock age(s): Precambrian, Mesozoic
- Rock type: granite

The Chersky Range (Russian: Хребет Черского) is a mountain range in the Transbaikal Region (Zabaykalsky Krai) of Siberia, Russia. The range rises east of the city of Chita. It is named after explorer Jan Czerski and was formerly known as "Alentuy Range".

== Geography ==
The Chersky Range is part of the South Siberian System. It rises in the central part of the Transbaikal region of Russia, stretching in a northeast/southwest direction for roughly 650 meters (2,130 ft) between the left bank of the Chilka River and the valley of the Delingde River —a right tributary of the Vitim River of the Lena River basin. The Ingoda River breaks through the ridge in its central part, along the valley through which a section of the Trans-Siberian Railway crosses the range.

The relief of the range is characterized by smooth slopes. River Karenga, another tributary of the Vitim, separates the Chersky Range from the Yablonoi Mountains, which run roughly parallel to it. The highest point of the range is 1,644 meters (5,394 ft) high Golets Chingikhan (Голец Чингикан), a ‘’golets’’-type of mountain with a bald peak, located in the central part.

== Flora ==
The slopes of the range are mainly covered with mountain pine and larch taiga, as well as fir, spruce, dwarf birch and Siberian pine in the deep mountain valleys and on the northern sides.

== See also ==
- List of mountains and hills of Russia
