= Irina Saburova =

Russian writer

- Born: April 1, 1907; Riga, Latvia
- Died: November 22, 1979 (aged 72); Munich, Germany
- Writing career
- Notable work: Because of the Violets

Irina Evgenyevna Saburova (Russian: Ирина Евгеньевна Сабурова, 1 April 1907 – 22 November 1979) was a Russian writer, poet, translator, and magazine editor.

== Biography ==
Saburova was born in Riga, Latvia, and lived there and at her father's estate until 1915. She received her education in both German and Russian high schools, and then attended the French Institute in Riga. In 1917-18 she lived in Finland, afterwards returning to Riga and living there until 1943. She started writing at the age of eight; her first story was published in the Riga journal The Lighthouse in 1923. She contributed to various papers in Riga and the Soviet Union until the Soviet occupation of the Baltic states in 1940. From 1933 to 1940 she edited the journal For You, and worked as a translator.

During World War II she went to Berlin and then to Munich where she remained for the rest of her life. After 1953 she became a regular contributor to several international Russian papers, including The New Russian Word (New York City) and Unity (Melbourne). She worked as a translator at Radio Station Liberty in Munich from 1953 to 1973. Her first husband, Alexander Perfilyev, was a poet and journalist; her second husband, Baron von Rosenburg, an officer in the Imperial Russian Navy, died in 1958. From the 1940s through the 1970s she gave lectures and recitals in Bern, Switzerland, New York, Washington DC, Philadelphia, and many other cities. She was known for her fairy-tale novellas, but she also wrote historical and anti-utopian novels.

== English translations ==
- Because of the Violets, (short story), from A Russian Cultural Revival, University of Tennessee Press, 1981. ISBN 0-87049-296-9
