= Ingoda (river) =

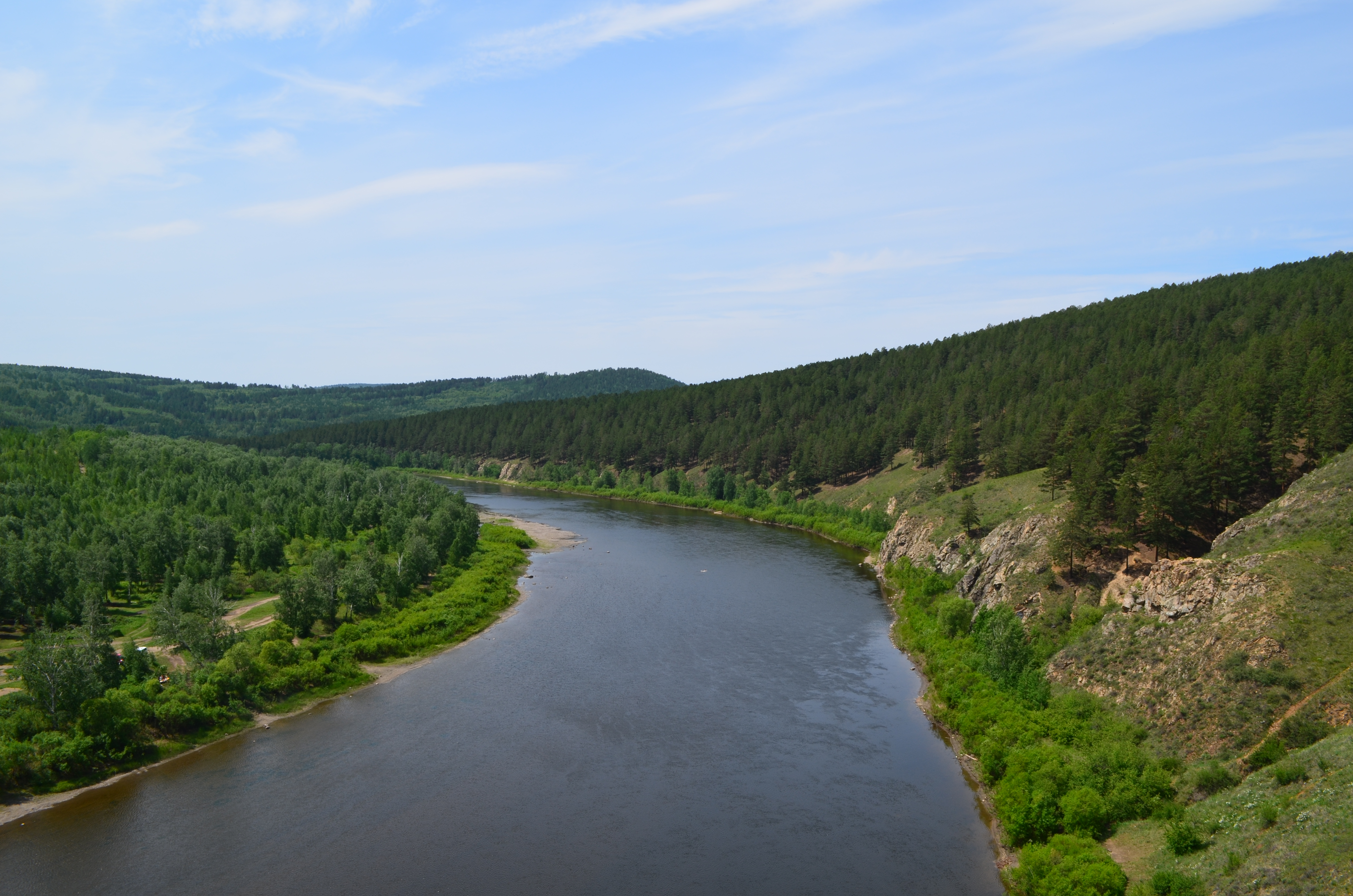
- Ingoda river next to Chita

Location
- Country: Russia

Physical characteristics
- Mouth: Shilka
  - coordinates: 51.7042°N 115.845°E
- Length: 708 km (440 mi)
- Basin size: 37,200 km^{2} (14,400 sq mi)

Basin features
- Progression: Shilka→ Amur→ Sea of Okhotsk

The Ingoda (Russian: Ингода́; Mongolian: Ингэдэй, Ingedei; Buryat: Ангида, Angida) is a river in Zabaykalsky Krai of Russia. The river is 708 kilometres (440 mi) long and the area of its basin is 37,200 square kilometres (14,400 mi^{2}).

== Geography ==
In its upper course it flows at the feet of the Khentei Range. Together with the Onon, it forms the Shilka. The Ingoda freezes in early November and stays frozen until late April. The city of Chita lies at the confluence of the Ingoda and the Chitinka. A major portion of the Trans-Siberian Railway lies along the Ingoda valley. The name derives from the Evenki word ingakta which means "river with pebbly and sandy banks". Lake Kenon, located in the western outskirts of Chita, is part of the Ingoda river basin.

== See also ==
- Chersky Range (Transbaikalia)
