= Nercha =

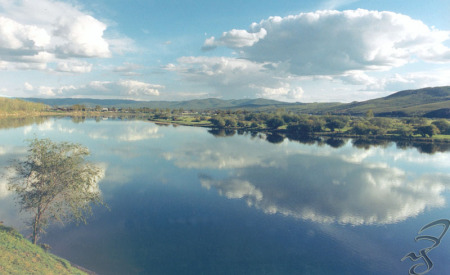

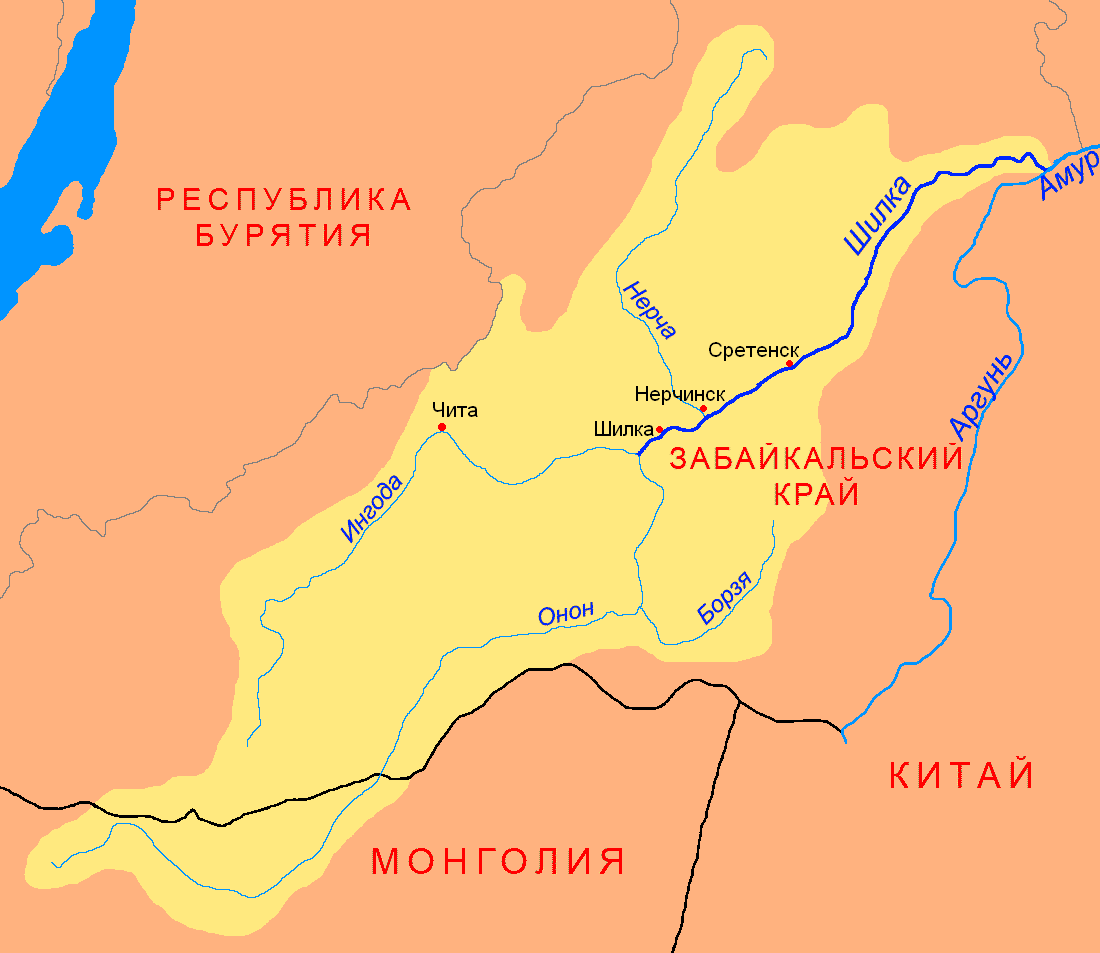
- Shilka basin, including Nercha

Location
- Country: Russia

Physical characteristics
- Source: Olyokma-Stanovik
- Mouth: Shilka
  - coordinates: 51.9169°N 116.6411°E
- Length: 580 km (360 mi)
- Basin size: 27,500 km^{2} (10,600 sq mi)

Basin features
- Progression: Shilka→ Amur→ Sea of Okhotsk

Nercha

Chinese name
- Chinese: 尼布楚河
Transcriptions
Standard Mandarin
- Hanyu Pinyin: Níbùchǔ hé

Manchu name
- Manchu script: Nibcu bira

Russian name
- Russian: Нерча

The Nercha (Russian: Нерча, Buryat: Нэршүү, Nershüü; Mongolian: Нэрчүү, Nerchüü) is a river in Zabaykalsky Krai in Russia, left tributary of the Shilka (Amur's basin). The length of the river is 580 kilometres (360 mi). The area of its basin is 27,500 square kilometres (10,600 sq mi). The Nercha freezes up in October and stays icebound until late April – early May. The town of Nerchinsk is located on the Nercha, (Note: "Not until 1656 did Filippovich Pashkov, the voevoda of Yeneiseisk, found Nerchinsk at the mouth of the Nercha River...") 7 kilometres (4 mi) from its confluence with the Shilka.
