= Transbaikal State University =

University in Chita, Russia

- Забайкальский государственный университет
- Motto: Latin: Non scholae, sed vitae discimus
- Motto in English: We do not learn for the school, but for life
- Established: 1974
- Rector: Sergey A. Ivanov (Russian: Серге́й Анатольевич Иванов)
- Faculty: >700
- Students: 15000
- Location: Chita, Russia; 52.032074°N 113.528882°E Building details
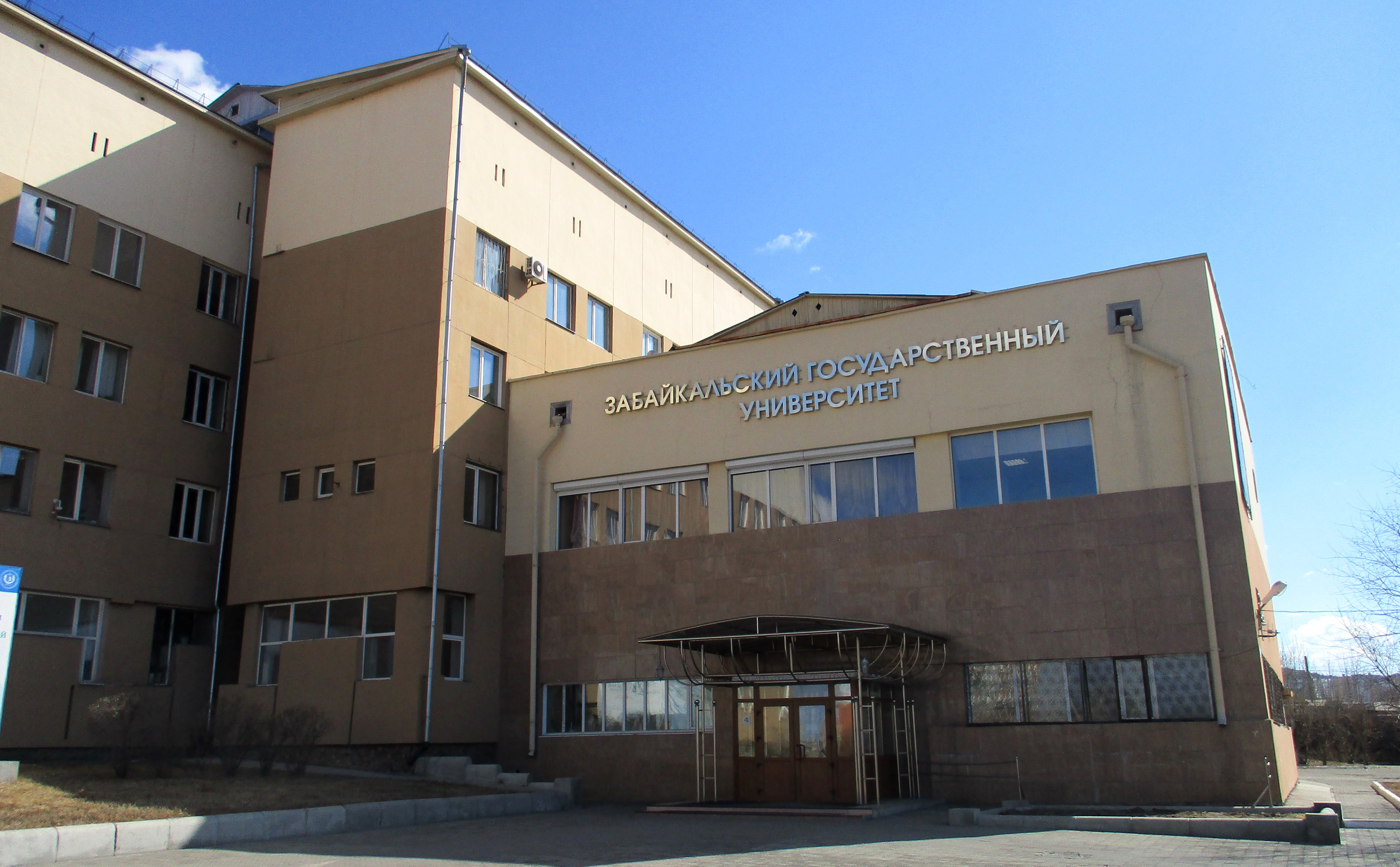
- Website: http://www.zabgu.ru/

Transbaikal State University (Russian: Забайкальский государственный университет) is an institution of higher education in Chita, Russia. It is the largest educational, scientific and innovative center in Zabaykalsky Krai. Transbaikal State University (until 2011: Chita State University) was established in 1974 on the base of the Technology Department of Irkutsk Technical Institute which was opened earlier in 1966.

Now the university comprises eight schools: the School of Mining, the School of Power Engineering, the School of Construction and Ecology, the School of Law, the School of Social and Political Systems, the School of Economics and Management, the School of Technological and Transportation Systems, and the School of Adult Education and Refresher Courses.

== History ==
1966 – The Technology Department of Irkutsk Technical Institute was established in Chita.
1967 – First groups of full-time students were admitted.
2003 – the university was granted the status of classical university and given the name of Chita State University. The School of Economics and Management and the School of Law were established. Specialized Academic Councils for Ph.D. Dissertations defending in the field of Philosophy and Geoecology were established.
2011 - University has been renamed as Transbaikal State University.

== Administration and Organization ==
=== School of Power Engineering ===
The School of Power Engineering was established in 2000 as result of the reorganization of the Faculty of Power Engineering of the former Chita Technical Institute. The main fields of scientific research of the School are the following: energy efficiency upgrading of combined heat and power stations machinery, energy saving during the process of its generation and consumption, reduction of heat and power stations' hazardous emissions, drinking water purification and sewage treatment, electronic communication development of economy and education.

The School comprises two faculties:

1. The Faculty of Power Technology
2. The Faculty of Computer Science and Economics

The School offers post-graduate programs in:

- Mathematical Analysis
- Colloid Chemistry and Physicochemical Mechanics
- Power Stations and Electric Power Systems
- Heat and Power Stations and their Power Systems and Units
- Power Plant Economics and Management

=== School of Economics and Management ===
The School of Economics and Management was established in 2003 on the basis of the Faculty of Management of Chita State University.

The School structure comprises two faculties:

1. The Faculty of Economics
2. The Faculty of Humanities

=== The School of Mining ===
The Mining School was established in 1998 on the basis of the Department of Mineral Deposits Exploitation of the Chita Division of Irkutsk Technical Institute.

The School of Mining comprises two faculties:

1. The Faculty of Mining
2. The Faculty of Geology

=== School of Construction and Ecology ===
The School of Construction and Ecology was established in 1999 as result of the reorganization of the Faculty of Civil Engineering, founded in 1972 on the basis of the Chita Branch of Irkutsk Technical Institute.

The school has two faculties:

1. Faculty of Civil Engineering
2. Ecological Faculty

The school offers post-graduate the following programs:

- Building materials and Products;
- Geoecology;
- Geotechnology;
- Theoretical mechanics;
- Construction Technology and Organisation.
- Geo-technology
- Geo-ecology

=== School of Technological and Transport Systems ===
The School of Technological and Transportation Systems of Chita State University was established in June 2000 on the basis of the Mechanical and Machine - Building Faculty of the former Chita State Technical University.

The school has two Faculties:

1. Technological Faculty
2. Automobile Transportation

=== The School of Social and Political Systems ===
The School comprises two faculties:

1. Socio-Psychological Faculty
2. The Faculty of Social Systems and Regional Forecasting

=== School of Law ===
The School of Law was established in September 2003, on the basis of the School of Economy, Management and Law.

The structure of the School comprises two faculties:

1. The Faculty of Law
2. The faculty of International Law

== Academics and Research ==
=== Research Centers ===
- Geological Research Center
- Research Center for Innovative Technology
- Analytical Science Social Service
- Scientific Technical Center "Economical Problems of Nature Management"
- Educational and Scientific Centre "Mashinostroitel"
- Institute of Natural Resources, Environment and Cryology of Siberian Branch of the Russian Academy of Sciences
- Zabaikalsky Research Center for Forecasting Regional Development
- Scientific and Methodological Center for Youth
- Service Center Electricity Department for the Implementation, Commissioning and Repair of Electrical Energy-Saving Equipment
- International Centre for Languages and Cultures Chita State University and Dalian University of Foreign Languages
- International Research and Educational Center for Research in the Field of Ethnology and Anthropology
- Eastern Research Center
- Student Research Center for Ethnological Laboratory (ethnographic) Research
- Center for Information Technologies in Economics and Management
- Higher School of Economics, Management and Entrepreneurship

=== Laboratories ===
- Multimedia Laboratory, School of Power Engineering
- Scientific and Analytical Laboratory, School of Mining
- Research laboratory "Health saving technologies in higher education"
- Laboratory of Chemical Analysis, School of Power Engineering
- Centre for Innovation and Strategic Development
- Laboratory "Problems of Organizational and Legal Support of Local Government", The School of Law

=== Research Centers, Acting on the basis of ChitGU ===
- Zabaikalsky Center of the Russian Academy of Natural Sciences
- Zabaikalsky Region of the International Academy of Ecology and Life Safety
- Zabaikalsky Branch of Russian Academy of Law Sciences
- Chita regional branch of the International Academy of Pedagogical Science
- Center for Information Technologies in Economics and Management
- Zabaikalsky Regional Office of Russian-Chinese Friendship
- Chita regional department of Russian Lawyers Association

=== Chita Institute of Far Eastern Branch of Russian Academy of Sciences ===
Chita Institute of Far Eastern Branch of Russian Academy of Sciences was established in 2005 as a structural unit of ChitSU with the assistance of the Administration of Zabaikalskii Region.

=== Student Scientific Societies ===
- Student Research Laboratory in multimedia, School of Power Engineering
- Student Design Bureau
- Student Center for Legal Research «Прецедентъ»
- Student Design Bureau of The Industrial Processes Automation Department
- Student Design Bureau «Сталкер», Department of Physics and Communications Technology
- Student Design Bureau, Department Metal Technology and Design

== International Cooperation and Exchange ==
Development of scientific and educational relations with foreign institutions of higher education is one of the most important aspects of university policy nowaday. Among the partners of Chita State University are the following Universities and organisations:

=== South Korea ===
- Gyeongsang National University, Jinju - "2+2" Exchange program for students, Exchange program for faculty members.

=== People's Republic of China ===
- Shandong Institute of Business and Technology, Yantai - Exchange and cooperation program;
- Jilin Normal University, Siping - Exchange and cooperation program;
- Dalian University of Foreign Languages, Dalian
- Wuhan University, Wuhan

=== Vietnam ===
- Hanoi University, Hanoi

=== Singapore ===
- Genetic Computer School, Singapore

=== Ukraine ===
- National Research Center of Nikitsky Botanical Garden, Yalta
- National Pedagogical Dragomanov University, Kyiv

=== Kazakhstan ===
- Pavlodar State University (named after S. Toraigyrov), Kazakhstan

=== Mongolia ===
- Mongolian National University, Ulaanbaatar

=== The Republic of Belarus ===
- Polessky State University, Pinsk
