= Chitinka =

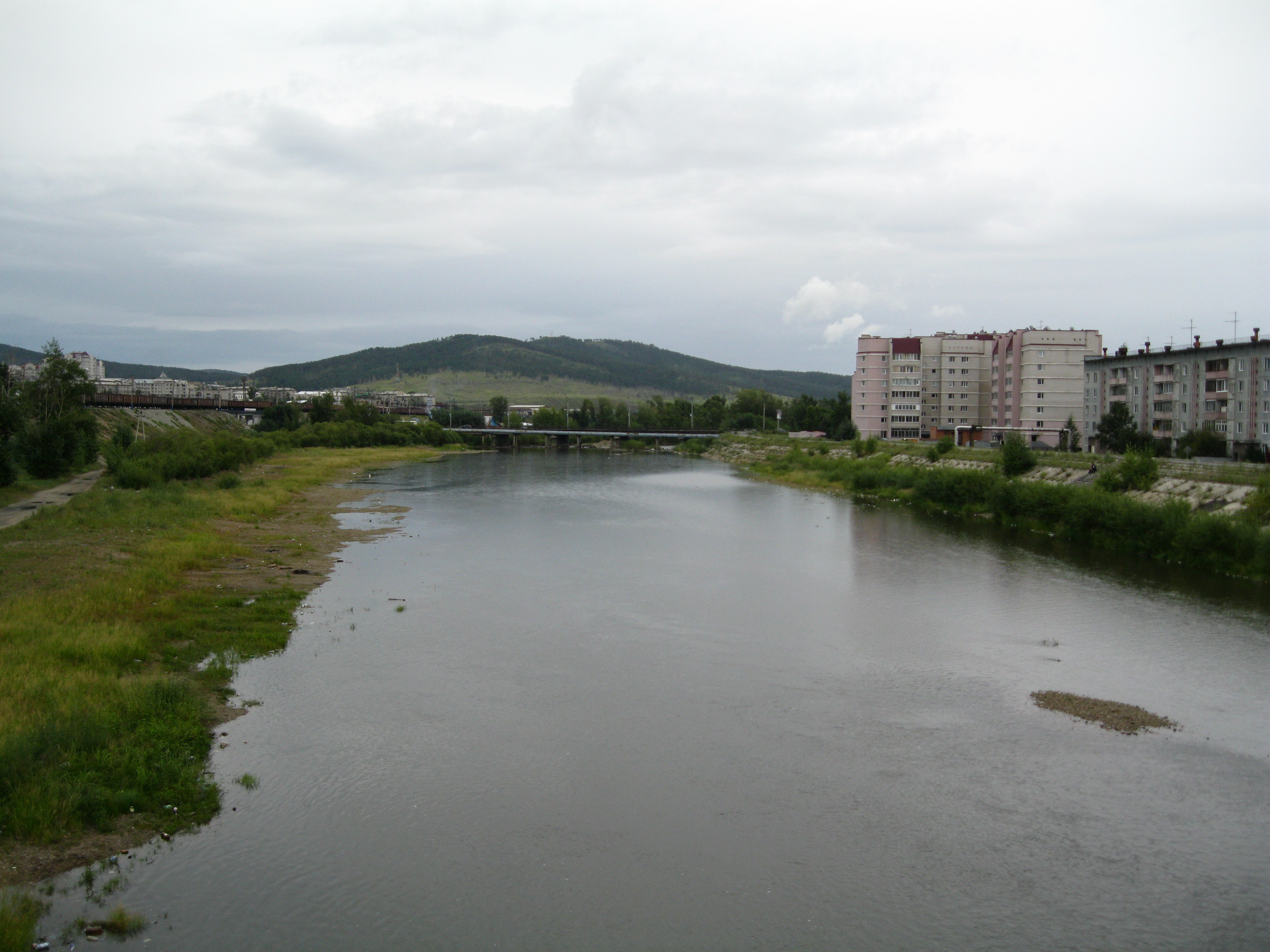

Location
- Country: Russia

Physical characteristics
- Mouth: Ingoda
  - coordinates: 52°00′28″N 113°31′16″E
- Length: 210 km (130 mi)
- Basin size: 4,200 km^{2} (1,600 sq mi)

Basin features
- Progression: Ingoda→ Shilka→ Amur→ Sea of Okhotsk

The Chitinka (Russian: Читинка, also Чита Chita) is a river in Zabaykalsky Krai in Russia. It is a left tributary of the Ingoda (in Amur's drainage basin). It is 210 kilometres (130 mi) long, and has a drainage basin of 4,200 square kilometres (1,600 sq mi). The river has its sources in the Yablonovy Mountains, and then flows in a south-southwesterly direction, until it joins the Ingoda in the city of Chita.

The river is heavily polluted, particularly from runoff from the city of Chita. In the years following the breakup of the Soviet Union there were also built a large number of holiday houses (dachas) along the river. This, combined with infills and straightening of river bends and other developments in the river bed, has made the river narrower and caused the water levels to rise. Because of this the risk of flooding in the spring has increased considerably.
