= Shilka (river) =

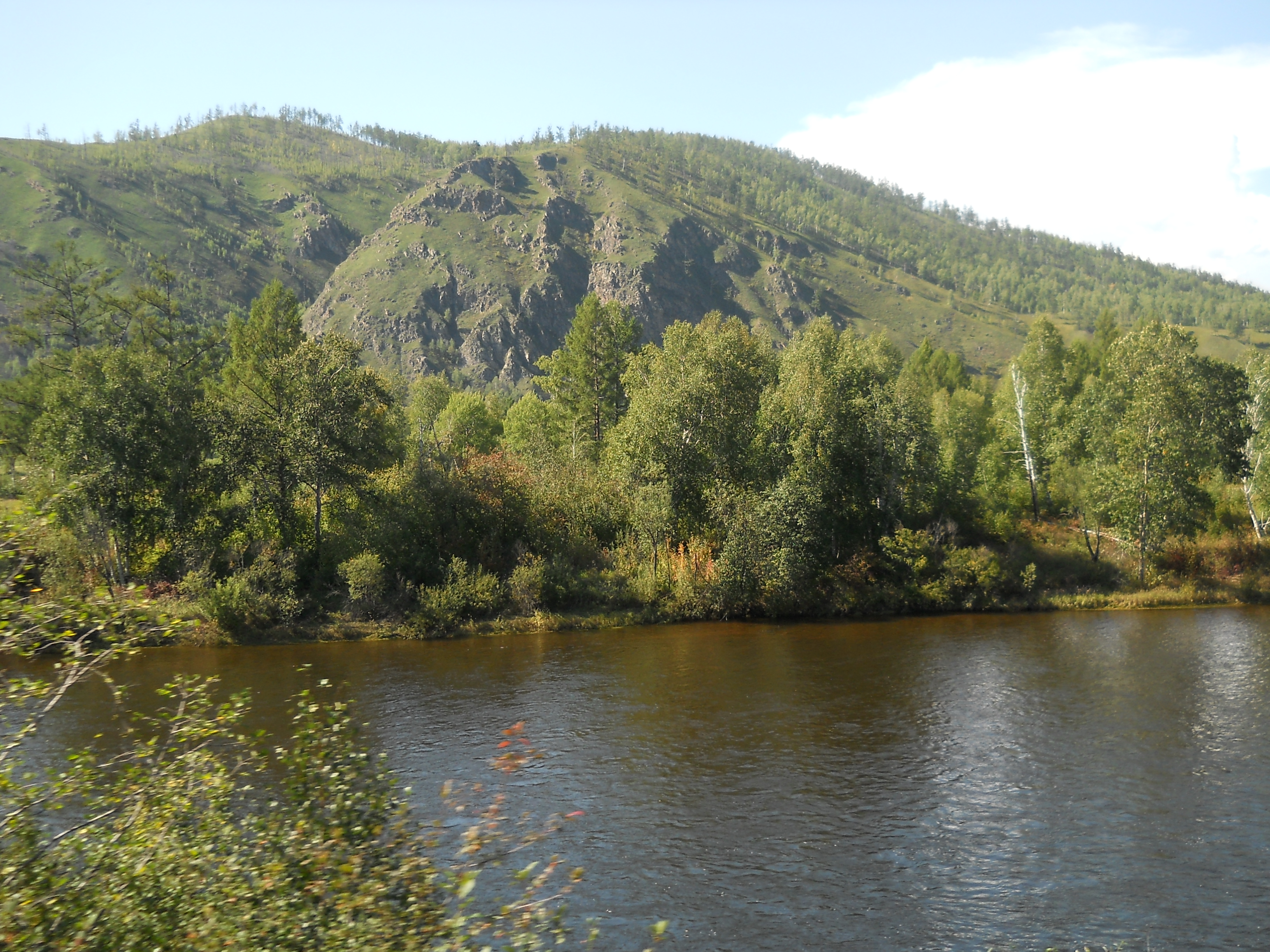
- The Shilka River near Bolotovo.

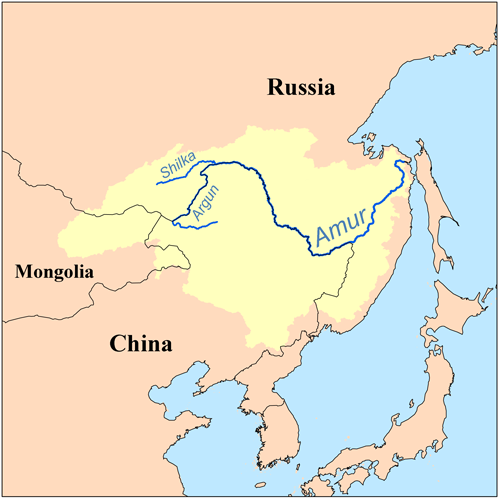
- Location of the Shilka River within the Amur Basin

Location
- Country: Russia

Physical characteristics
- Mouth: Amur
  - coordinates: 53°19′58″N 121°28′49″E
- Length: 560 km (350 mi)
- Basin size: 206,000 km^{2} (80,000 sq mi)
- Discharge
  - average: 440 m^{3}/s (16,000 cu ft/s)

Basin features
- Progression: Amur→ Sea of Okhotsk

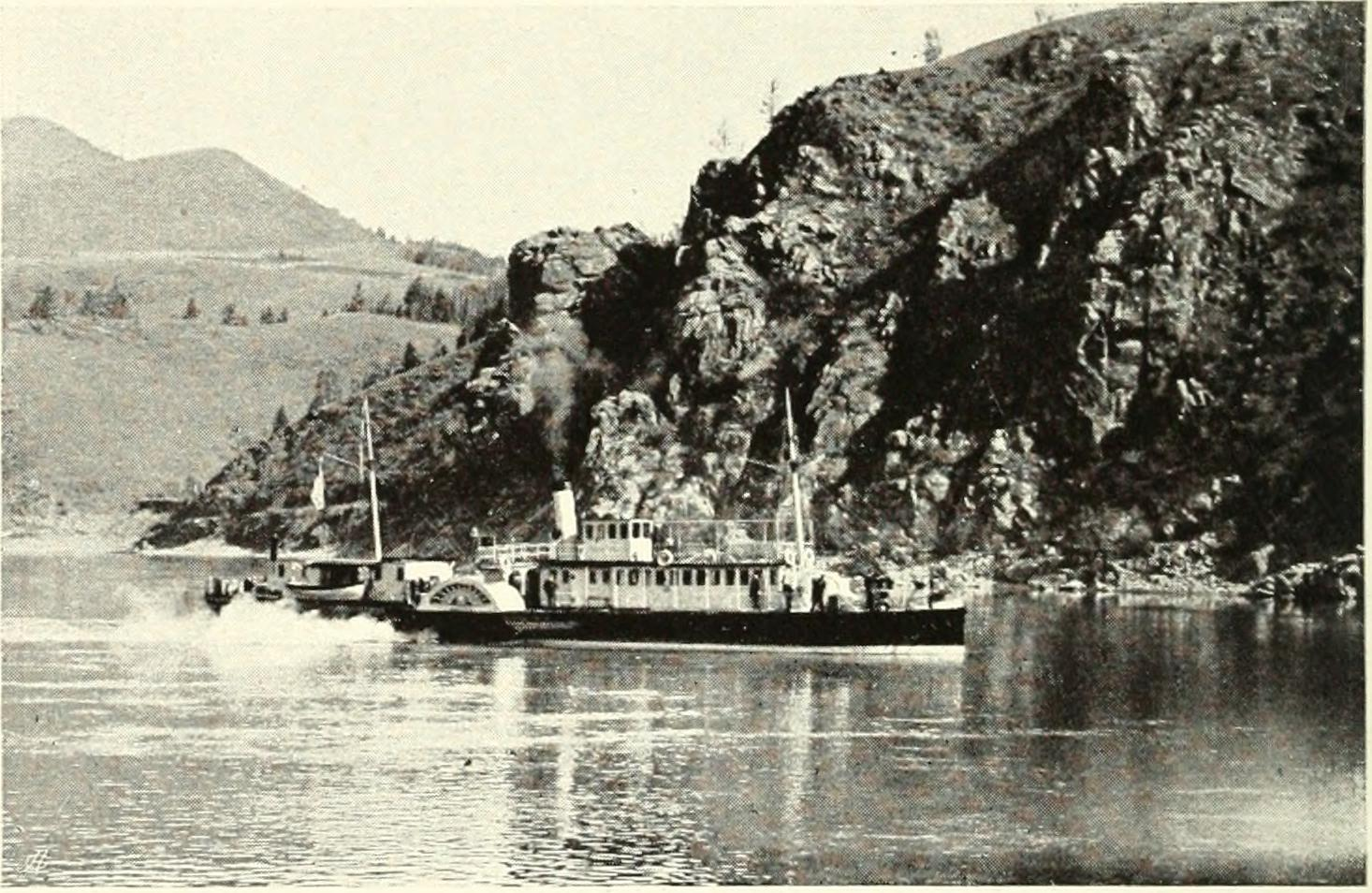
The S.S. AMUR on the Shilka River (c.1902)

The Shilka (Russian: Ши́лка; Evenki: Силькари, Sil'kari; Buryat: Шилкэ, Shilke; Mongolian: Шилка, Shilka; Chinese: 石勒喀; pinyin: shílē kā) is a river in Zabaykalsky Krai, (Dauria) south-eastern Russia. It has a length of 560 km (350 mi), and has a drainage basin of 206,000 square kilometres (80,000 sq mi).

The name derives from Evenki shilki 'narrow valley.'

== Course ==
It originates as the confluence of the rivers Onon and Ingoda. Its confluence with the Argun on the Russia-China border gives rise to the Amur. The river is navigable for its entire length. The town Sretensk lies on the Shilka.

=== Tributaries ===
The largest tributaries of the Shilka are, from source to mouth:

- Onon (right)
- Ingoda (left)
- Nercha (left)
- Kuenga (left)
- Chacha (left)
- Kara (left)
- Chyornaya (left)

== See also ==
- Selenga Highlands
- List of rivers of Russia
