= Chitinsky District =

Chitinsky District Читинский район (Russian)
- District
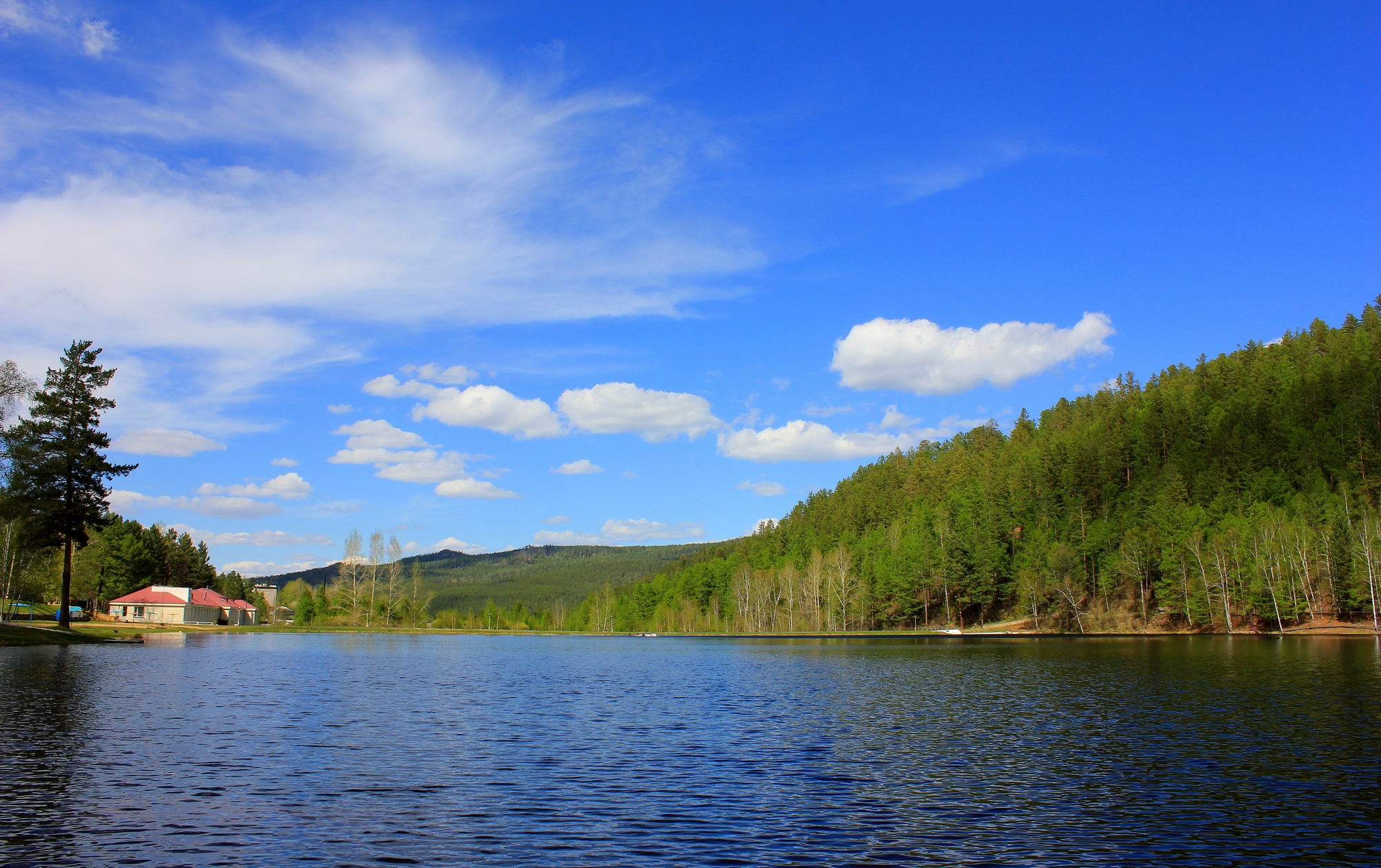
- Molokovka Resort, Chita

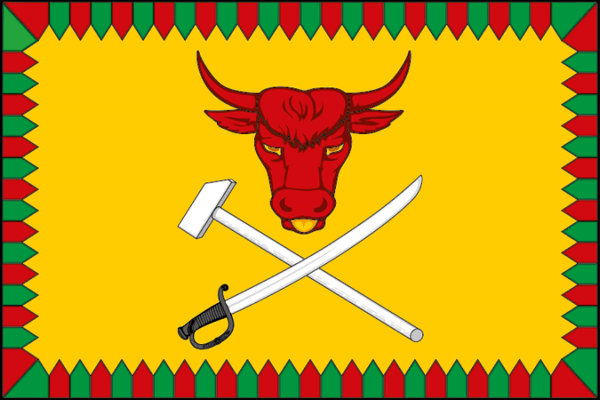
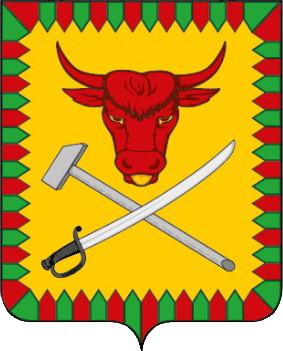
- Flag Coat of arms
- Location of Chitinsky District in Zabaykalsky Krai
- Coordinates: 52.149°N 113.661°E
- Country: Russia
- Federal subject: Zabaykalsky Krai
- Established: September 26, 1937
- Administrative center: Chita

Area
  - Total: 16,100 km^{2} (6,200 sq mi)

Population (2010 Census)
  - Total: 64,642
  - Estimate (2018): 64,922 (+0.4%)
  - Density: 4.02/km^{2} (10.4/sq mi)
  - Urban: 32.9%
  - Rural: 67.1%

Administrative structure
  - Inhabited localities: 1 cities/towns, 3 urban-type settlements, 55 rural localities

Municipal structure
  - Municipally incorporated as: Chitinsky Municipal District
  - Municipal divisions: 2 urban settlements, 20 rural settlements
- Time zone: UTC+9 (MSK+6)
- OKTMO ID: 76650000
- Website: http://xn--h1aaglud7a.xn--80aaaac8algcbgbck3fl0q.xn--p1ai/

Chitinsky District (Russian: Чити́нский райо́н) is an administrative district (raion), one of the thirty-one in Zabaykalsky Krai, Russia. It is located in the west of the krai, and borders with Karymsky District in the east, Duldurginsky District in the south, and with Khiloksky District in the west. The area of the district is 16,100 square kilometers (6,200 sq mi). Its administrative center is the city of Chita. Population (excluding the administrative center): 64,642 (2010 census); 62,221 (2002 Census); 62,366 (1989 Soviet census).

== History ==
The district was established on September 26, 1937.

== Geography ==
The Yablonoi Mountains and the Chersky Range stretch from NE to SW across the district, one west and the other east of the city of Chita. The mountains are smooth and of moderate height. They are mainly covered by larch taiga. The Arakhley Lake is located west of Chita.

== Administrative and municipal status ==
Within the framework of administrative divisions, Chitinsky District is one of the thirty-one in the krai. The city of Chita serves as its administrative center.

As a municipal division, the territory of the district is split between two municipal formations—Chitinsky Municipal District, to which three urban-type settlements and fifty-four of the administrative district's rural localities belong, and Chita Urban Okrug, which covers the rest of the administrative district's territory, including the city of Chita and the remaining rural locality.

== See also ==
- Arakhley
