= Duldurga =

Duldurga Дульдурга
- Selo

Other transcription(s)
  - Buryat: Дульдарга
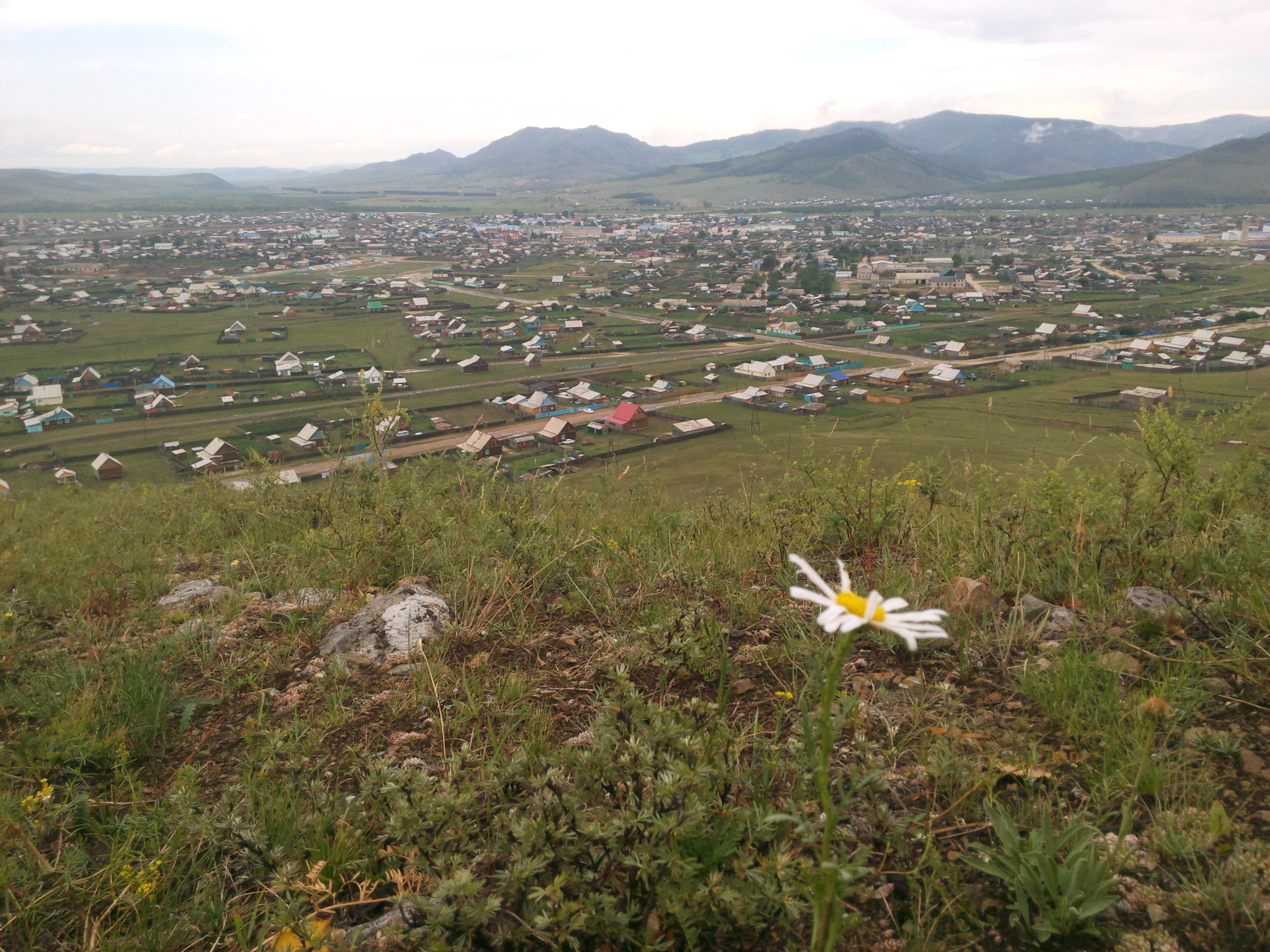
- Interactive map of Duldurga
- Location of Duldurga Duldurga (Zabaykalsky Krai)
- Coordinates: 50°41′N 113°35′E
- Country: Russia
- Federal subject: Zabaykalsky Krai
- Administrative district: Duldurginsky District
- Founded: 1803

Population (2010 Census)
  - Total: 6,651

Administrative status
  - Capital of: Duldurginsky District
- Time zone: UTC+9 (MSK+6)
- Postal code: 687200
- OKTMO ID: 76611416101

Duldurga (Russian: Дульдурга; Buryat: Дульдарга, Duldarga) is a rural locality (a selo) and the administrative center of Duldurginsky District of Zabaykalsky Krai, Russia.

== Geography ==
It is located on the right bank of the river Ilya, at the mouth of the river. Duldurga, 90 km to the south-west from the village Aginskoye, 115 km (along the highway) from the railway station. The city of Chita is 192 km away. The Alkhanay National Park is near the village. There is a library, a hospital complex and a school named "school of the year" on several occasions.

== History ==
Duldurga was founded in 1803 by its first settler, P. Gusev. In 1937, it became the administrative center of the district. A timber cooperative was formed in 1963.

== Demographics ==
Population: 6,651 (2010 census); 6,382 (2002 census); 5,613 (1989 Soviet census).
