= Duldurginsky District =

Duldurginsky District Дульдургинский район (Russian)
- District
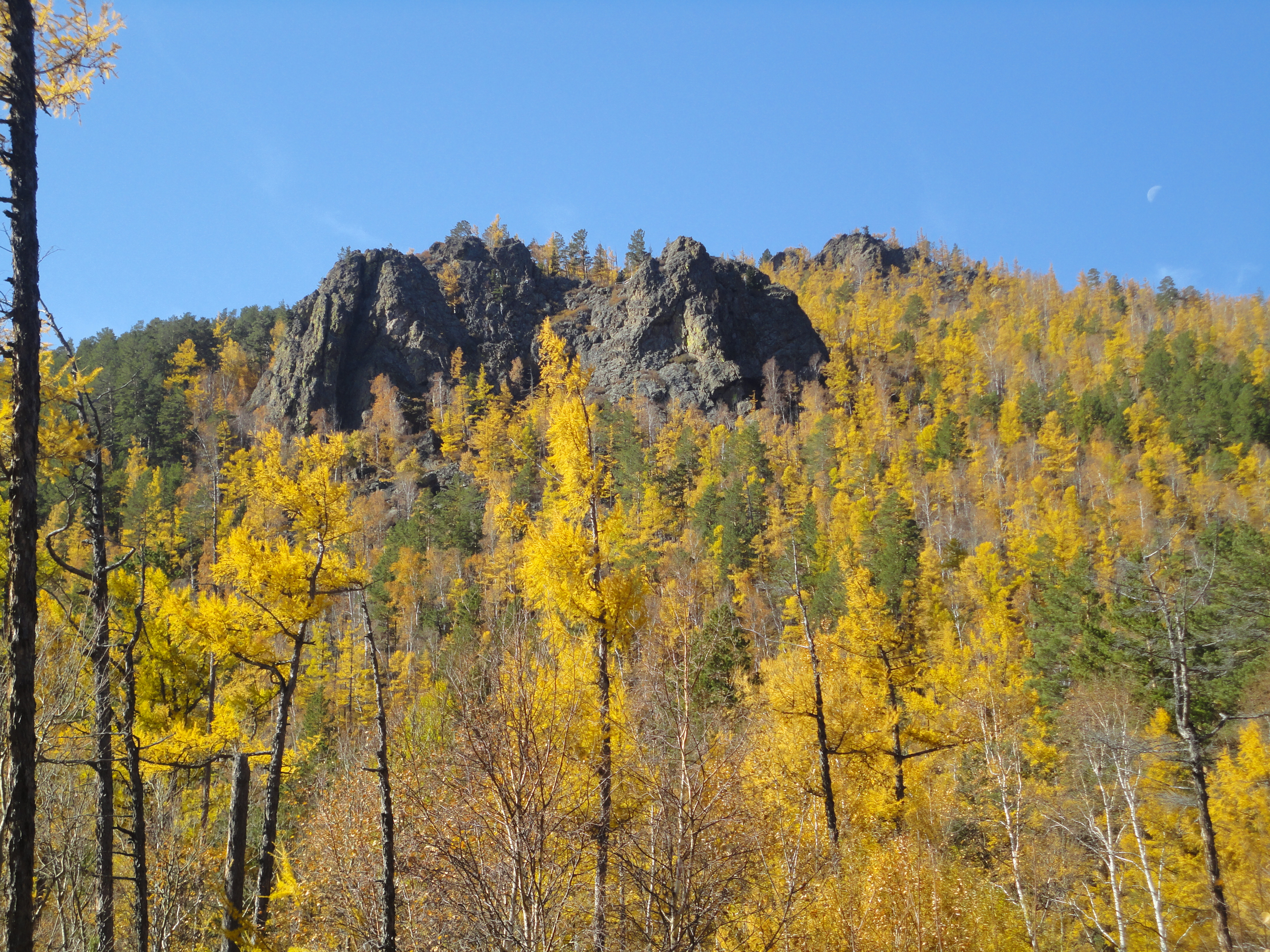
- Alkhanai Mountain

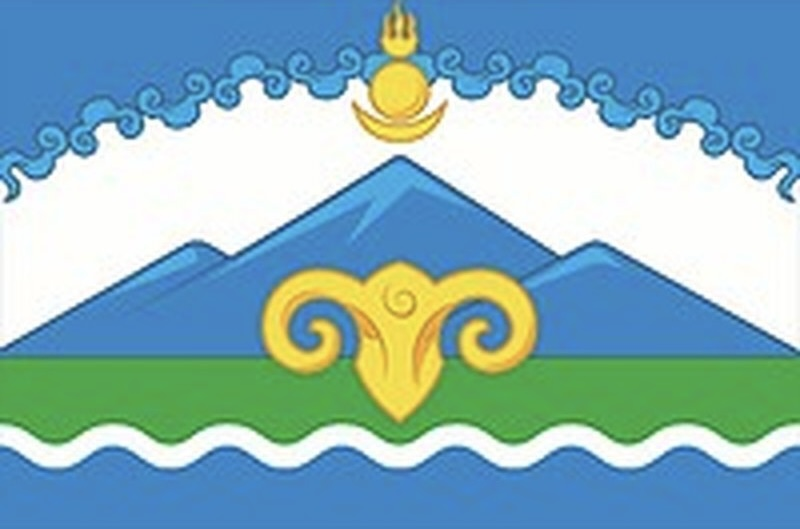
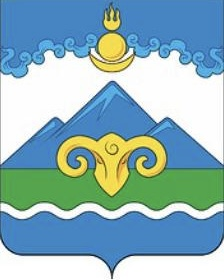
- Flag Coat of arms
- Location of Duldurginsky District in Agin-Buryat Okrug, Zabaykalsky Krai
- Coordinates: 50.793°N 113.471°E
- Country: Russia
- Federal subject: Zabaykalsky Krai
- Established: January 16, 1941
- Administrative center: Duldurga

Area
  - Total: 7,200 km^{2} (2,800 sq mi)

Population (2010 Census)
  - Total: 15,350
  - Density: 2.1/km^{2} (5.5/sq mi)
  - Urban: 0%
  - Rural: 100%

Administrative structure
  - Inhabited localities: 12 rural localities

Municipal structure
  - Municipally incorporated as: Duldurginsky Municipal District
  - Municipal divisions: 0 urban settlements, 10 rural settlements
- Time zone: UTC+9 (MSK+6)
- OKTMO ID: 76611000

Duldurginsky District (Russian: Дульдургинский райо́н) is an administrative and municipal district (raion) of Agin-Buryat Okrug of Zabaykalsky Krai, Russia, one of the thirty-one in the krai. It is located in the south of the krai, and borders with Chitinsky District in the north, Aginsky District in the east, Akshinsky District in the south, and with Ulyotovsky District in the west. The area of the district is 7,200 square kilometers (2,800 sq mi). Its administrative center is the rural locality (a selo) of Duldurga. Population: 15,350 (2010 census); 15,316 (2002 Census); 15,550 (1989 Soviet census). The population of Duldurga accounts for 43.3% of the district's total population.

== Geography ==
The Khentei-Daur Highlands rise at the southwestern end of the district.

== History ==
The district was established on January 16, 1941.
