= Chita, Zabaykalsky Krai =

City in Zabaykalsky Krai, Russia

Chita Чита
- City
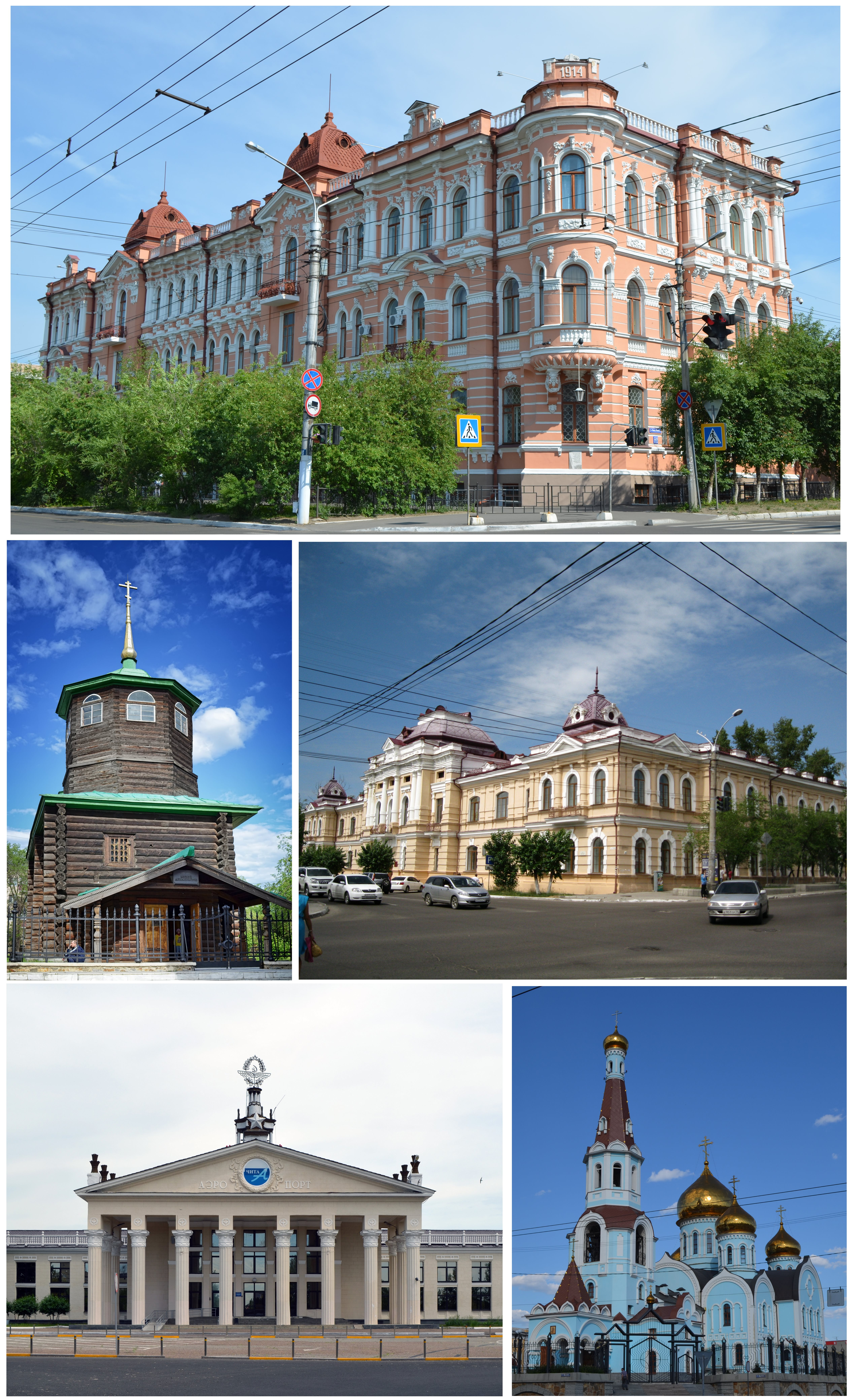
- Shumovs Merchants' House, Museum "Church of the Decembrists", Pedagogical Institute Chita, Airport, Cathedral of the Kazan Icon of the Mother of God

- Flag Coat of arms
- Interactive map of Chita
- Location of Chita Chita (Zabaykalsky Krai)
- Coordinates: 52°03′N 113°28′E
- Country: Russia
- Federal subject: Zabaykalsky Krai
- Administrative district: Chitinsky District
- Founded: 1653
- City status since: July 11, 1851

Government
  - Mayor: Evgeniy Yarilov
- Elevation: 650 m (2,130 ft)

Population (2010 Census)
  - Total: 324,444
  - Estimate (2025): 337,063 (+3.9%)
  - Rank: 56th in 2010

Administrative status
  - Capital of: Zabaykalsky Krai, Chitinsky District

Municipal status
  - Urban okrug: Chita Urban Okrug
  - Capital of: Chita Urban Okrug
- Time zone: UTC+9 (MSK+6)
- Postal code: 672000–672051
- Dialing code: +7 3022
- OKTMO ID: 76701000001
- Website: www.admin.chita.ru

Chita (Russian: Чита, IPA: [tɕɪˈta]) is a city and the administrative center of Zabaykalsky Krai, Russia, located on the Trans-Siberian Railway route, roughly 1,100 kilometers (680 mi) east of Irkutsk and roughly 2,100 kilometers (1,300 mi) west of Khabarovsk. As of the 2021 census, the population is 334,427.

== History ==
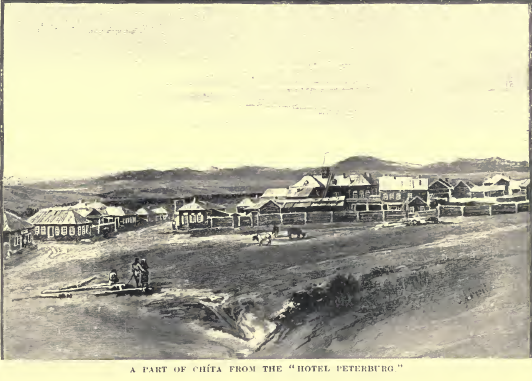
Chita in 1885

Pyotr Beketov's Cossacks founded Chita in 1653. The name of the settlement came from the local River Chita.

Following the Decembrist revolt of 1825, from 1827 several of the Decembrists suffered exile to Chita. According to George Kennan, who visited the area in the 1880s, "Among the exiles in Chita were some of the brightest, most cultivated, most sympathetic men and women that we had met in Eastern Siberia."

When Richard Maack visited the city in 1855, he saw a wooden town, with one church, also wooden. He estimated Chita's population at under 1,000, but predicted that the city would soon experience fast growth, due to the upcoming annexation of the Amur valley by Russia.

By 1885, Chita's population had reached 5,728, and by 1897 it increased to 11,500. In 1897 the Trans-Siberian Railway reached Chita; rail traffic from 1899 rapidly made Chita the transport hub and industrial centre of the Transbaikal.

During the Russian Revolution of 1905, revolutionary socialists declared the Chita Republic. Tsarist government forces took control again in January 1906.

The Bolsheviks took power in Chita in February 1918. The Imperial Japanese Army occupied Chita from September 1918 to 1920 in the course of the Siberian intervention. On behalf of the White movement, Ataman Grigory Semyonov's Eastern Okraina ruled from Chita for some few months in early 1920 with Japanese support. From October 1920 to November 1922 the city served as the capital of the Far Eastern Republic, which became part of the RSFSR in November 1922.

In 1945, the Soviet authorities held Puyi, who had reigned (1908–1912, 1917) as the last Emperor of China, and some of his associates as prisoners in the city, in a former sanatorium for officers.

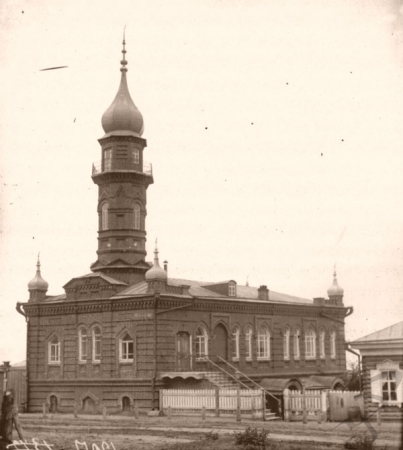
Chita Mosque in 1902

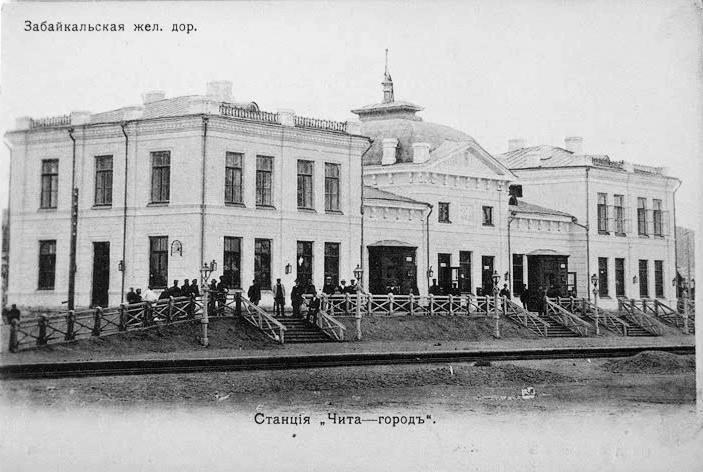
Chita railway station in 1910

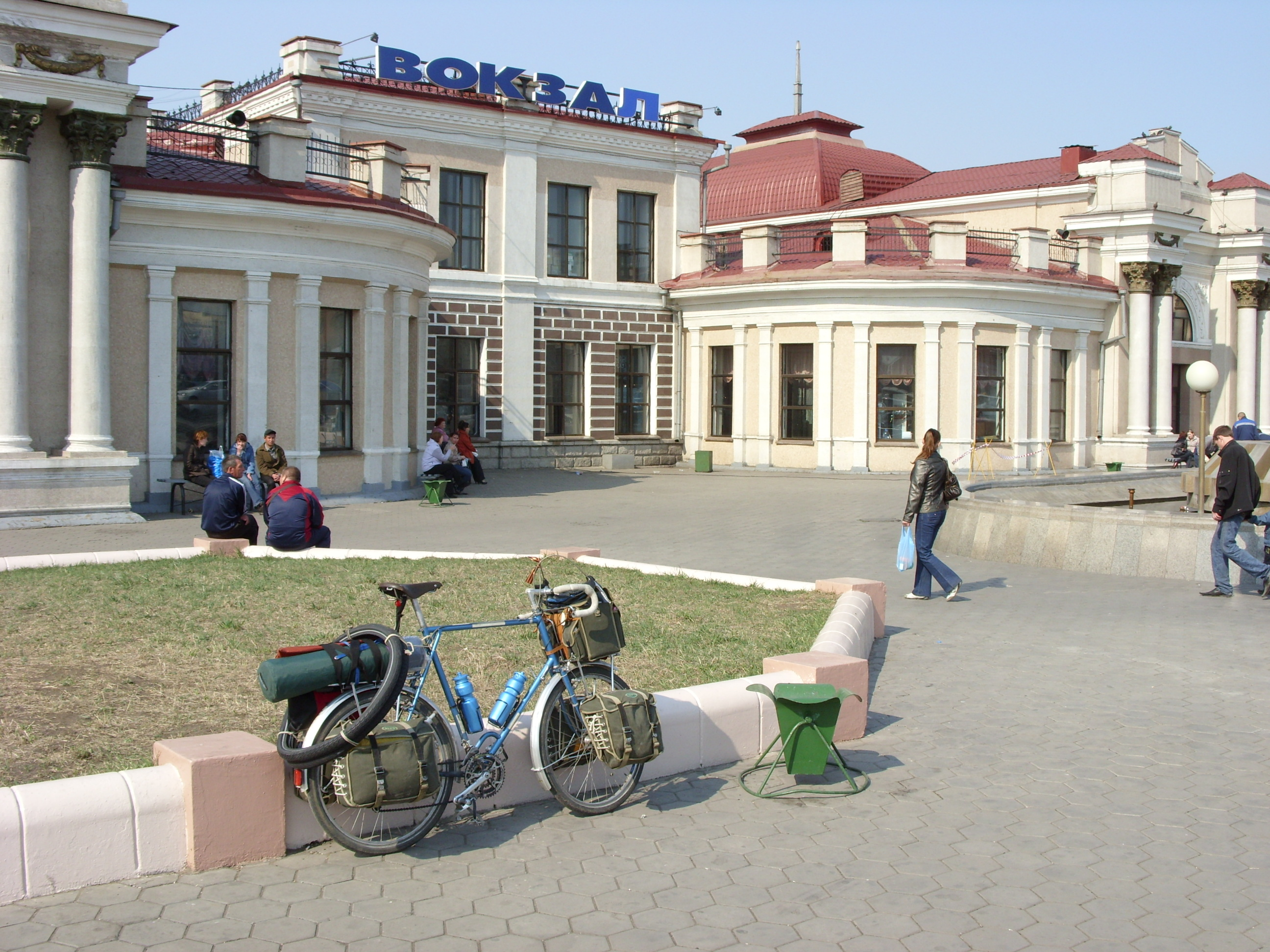
Chita railway station today

== Geography ==
Chita lies at the confluence of the Chita and Ingoda Rivers, between the Yablonoi Mountains to the west and the Chersky Range to the east. Lake Kenon is located to the west, within the city limits, and the Ivan-Arakhley Lake System is a group of lakes lying about 50 km (31 mi) west of Chita.

=== Climate ===
Chita experiences a dry-winter borderline humid continental climate/subarctic climate (Köppen climate classification: Dwb/Dwc, Trewartha climate classification Dcbc/Ecbc) with very cold and dry winters and warm, relatively wet summers. Despite the southerly latitude, its winter temperatures are comparable to those of Fairbanks, Alaska.

Climate data for Chita (1991–2020, extremes 1890–present)
Month	Jan	Feb	Mar	Apr	May	Jun	Jul	Aug	Sep	Oct	Nov	Dec	Year
Record high °C (°F)	0.4 (32.7)	7.4 (45.3)	21.1 (70.0)	29.3 (84.7)	34.6 (94.3)	38.8 (101.8)	38.0 (100.4)	40.6 (105.1)	30.9 (87.6)	22.7 (72.9)	12.7 (54.9)	5.0 (41.0)	40.6 (105.1)
Mean daily maximum °C (°F)	−17.2 (1.0)	−9.5 (14.9)	0.0 (32.0)	9.7 (49.5)	18.2 (64.8)	24.9 (76.8)	26.7 (80.1)	23.7 (74.7)	16.8 (62.2)	7.0 (44.6)	−6.0 (21.2)	−15.7 (3.7)	6.6 (43.9)
Daily mean °C (°F)	−24.6 (−12.3)	−18.3 (−0.9)	−8.1 (17.4)	2.2 (36.0)	10.2 (50.4)	17.1 (62.8)	19.5 (67.1)	16.6 (61.9)	9.2 (48.6)	−0.1 (31.8)	−12.5 (9.5)	−22.1 (−7.8)	−0.9 (30.4)
Mean daily minimum °C (°F)	−30.4 (−22.7)	−25.9 (−14.6)	−16.0 (3.2)	−5.0 (23.0)	2.2 (36.0)	9.2 (48.6)	12.7 (54.9)	10.4 (50.7)	2.7 (36.9)	−6.0 (21.2)	−18.0 (−0.4)	−27.4 (−17.3)	−7.6 (18.3)
Record low °C (°F)	−49.6 (−57.3)	−48.0 (−54.4)	−45.3 (−49.5)	−29.6 (−21.3)	−13.3 (8.1)	−5.4 (22.3)	0.1 (32.2)	−3.0 (26.6)	−10.8 (12.6)	−33.1 (−27.6)	−41.1 (−42.0)	−47.8 (−54.0)	−49.6 (−57.3)
Average precipitation mm (inches)	3 (0.1)	2 (0.1)	4 (0.2)	12 (0.5)	27 (1.1)	59 (2.3)	88 (3.5)	85 (3.3)	41 (1.6)	10 (0.4)	5 (0.2)	5 (0.2)	341 (13.4)
Average extreme snow depth cm (inches)	7 (2.8)	7 (2.8)	2 (0.8)	1 (0.4)	0 (0)	0 (0)	0 (0)	0 (0)	0 (0)	0 (0)	3 (1.2)	6 (2.4)	7 (2.8)
Average rainy days	0	0	1	5	11	16	18	17	13	5	0.2	0	86
Average snowy days	15	9	8	7	3	0.03	0	0	1	7	11	15	76
Average relative humidity (%)	76	72	59	47	46	58	68	73	66	61	70	77	64
Mean monthly sunshine hours	139	179	239	242	277	279	247	226	212	190	134	108	2,472
Source 1: Pogoda.ru.net
Source 2: NOAA (sun, 1961–1990)

== Administrative and municipal status ==
Chita is the administrative center of Zabaykalsky Krai, and, within the framework of administrative divisions, it also serves as the administrative center of Chitinsky District, to which it is also subordinated. As a municipal division, the city of Chita together with one rural locality in Chitinsky District is incorporated as Chita Urban Okrug.

== Demographics ==
Historical population
Year	Pop.	±%
1897	12,000	—
1926	57,982	+383.2%
1939	102,620	+77.0%
1959	171,816	+67.4%
1970	241,364	+40.5%
1979	302,577	+25.4%
1989	365,754	+20.9%
2002	316,643	−13.4%
2010	324,444	+2.5%
2021	334,427	+3.1%
Source: Census data

As of the 2021 Census, the ethnic groups of Chita were:

Ethnic group	Population	Percentage
Russians	217,937	92.6%
Buryats	6,969	3.0%
Armenians	1,013	0.4%
Other Ethnicities	9,403	4.0%
Ethnicity not stated	99,105	–

== City districts ==
The city is subdivided into four administrative districts: Chernovsky (named after the Chernovskiye coal mines and colloquially known as "Chernovskiye"), Ingodinsky (named after the Ingoda River), Tsentralny, and Zheleznodorozhny.

Chernovsky Administrative District used to be a mining settlement, which was incorporated into Chita in 1941. Chernovskiye mines themselves are a geological nature monument of international status.

== Transportation ==
Chita is served by Kadala Airport, situated 15 km to the west.

Chita railway station is a station on the Trans-Siberian Railway, between Ulan-Ude and Birobidzhan.

== Education ==
Chita is home to several facilities of higher education:

- Transbaikal State University (formerly Chita State University)
- Chita State Academy of Medicine

== Military ==
Chita Northwest air base is located nearby, as well as the 101st (Hub) Communications Brigade and the 53rd Material Support Regiment.

A submarine is named after the city.

== Sports ==
FC Chita is Chita's association football club.

An indoor arena for speed skating is planned.

== Twin towns – sister cities ==
Chita is twinned with:

- Hailar District, China (1992)
- Choibalsan, Mongolia (1994)
- Manzhouli, China (1999)
- Hulunbuir, China (2001)
- Ulan-Ude, Russia (2011)

== Notable people ==
- Yevgeni Alkhimov (born 1977), Russian professional footballer
- Matvei Berman (1898–1939), head of the Gulag, deputy head of the NKVD
- Stanislav Drobyshevsky (born 1978), Russian anthropologist and science popularizer
- Nataliya Kuznetsova (born 1991), Russian professional female bodybuilder who holds the world armlifting, bench press, and deadlift titles
- Oleg Lundstrem (1916–2005), Soviet and Russian jazz composer
- Igor Mirnov (born 1984), Russian professional ice hockey player
- Ivan Nagibin (born 1986), Russian professional football player
- Lev Okhotin (1911–1948), member of the Supreme Council of the Russian Fascist Party
- Aleksandr Perfilyev (1895–1973), Russian journalist, poet and writer
- Anastasia Pivovarova (born 1990), Russian professional tennis player
- Boris Polevoy (1918–2002), Russian historian
- Aleksandra Samusenko (1922–1945), Soviet Tank Captain, Sole female tank commander in 1st Guards Tank Army
- Volodymyr Shkidchenko (born 1948), Ukrainian military, General of Army of Ukraine
- Sergei Smirnov (born 1950), Russian security services official
- Anatoly Sobchak (1937–2000), Russian politician
- Vitaly Solomin (1941–2002), Soviet and Russian actor, director and screenwriter
- Yury Solomin (1935–2024), Soviet and Russian actor and director
- Alina Stadnik (born 1991), Ukrainian female wrestler
- Alexander Stranichkin (born 1955), Abkhazian politician
- Lyudmila Titova (born 1946), Russian speed skater
- Dmytro Tymchuk (born 1972), Ukrainian military expert and blogger
- Yemelyan Yaroslavsky (1878–1943), Russian revolutionary, Soviet politician, communist party organizer
- Oksana Zhnikrup (1931–1993), Ukrainian ceramicist, whose works inspired Jeff Koons
