= Administrative divisions of Chita Oblast =

Former administrative divison of Russian federal subject

Chita Oblast Russia
- Administrative centre: Chita

Administrative structure (as of February 29, 2008)
- Districts: 28
- Cities/towns: 10
- Urban-type settlements: 38
- Selsovets, rural administrations, rural municipal entities, rural okrugs, and rural settlements: 308

Municipal structure (as of 2002)
- Rural settlements: 699 (inhabited); 9 (uninhabited)

Chita Oblast was a federal subject of Russia until February 29, 2008. On March 1, 2008, it was merged with Agin-Buryat Autonomous Okrug to form Zabaykalsky Krai.

- Urban-type settlements under the federal government management:
  - Gorny (Горный)
- Cities and towns under the oblast's jurisdiction:
  - Chita (Чита) (administrative center)
    - city administrative districts:
      - Chernovsky (Черновский)
      - Ingodinsky (Ингодинский)
      - Tsentralny (Центральный)
      - Zheleznodorozhny (Железнодорожный)
  - Baley (Балей)
  - Borzya (Борзя)
  - Krasnokamensk (Краснокаменск)
  - Petrovsk-Zabaykalsky (Петровск-Забайкальский)
- Districts:
  - Akshinsky (Акшинский)
    - with 12 rural settlements under the district's jurisdiction.
  - Alexandrovo-Zavodsky (Александрово-Заводский)
    - with 19 rural settlements under the district's jurisdiction.
  - Baleysky (Балейский)
    - with 9 rural settlements under the district's jurisdiction.
  - Borzinsky (Борзинский)
    - Urban-type settlements under the district's jurisdiction:
      - Sherlovaya Gora (Шерловая Гора)
    - with 15 selsovets under the district's jurisdiction.
  - Chernyshevsky (Чернышевский)
    - Urban-type settlements under the district's jurisdiction:
      - Aksyonovo-Zilovskoye (Аксёново-Зиловское)
      - Bukachacha (Букачача)
      - Chernyshevsk (Чернышевск)
      - Zhireken (Жирекен)
    - with 14 rural okrugs under the district's jurisdiction.
  - Chitinsky (Читинский)
    - Urban-type settlements under the district's jurisdiction:
      - Atamanovka (Атамановка)
      - Novokruchininsky (Новокручининский)
      - Yablonovo (Яблоново)
    - with 20 rural okrugs under the district's jurisdiction.
  - Gazimuro-Zavodsky (Газимуро-Заводский)
    - with 9 selsovets under the district's jurisdiction.
  - Kalarsky (Каларский)
    - Urban-type settlements under the district's jurisdiction:
      - Novaya Chara (Новая Чара)
    - with 5 selsovets under the district's jurisdiction.
  - Kalgansky (Калганский)
    - Urban-type settlements under the district's jurisdiction:
      - Kadaya (Кадая)
    - with 10 selsovets under the district's jurisdiction.
  - Karymsky (Карымский)
    - Urban-type settlements under the district's jurisdiction:
      - Darasun (Дарасун)
      - Karymskoye (Карымское)
      - Kurort Darasun resort settlement (Курорт Дарасун)
    - with 10 selsovets under the district's jurisdiction.
  - Khiloksky (Хилокский)
    - Towns under the district's jurisdiction:
      - Khilok (Хилок)
    - Urban-type settlements under the district's jurisdiction:
      - Mogzon (Могзон)
    - with 10 rural okrugs under the district's jurisdiction.
  - Krasnochikoysky (Красночикойский)
    - with 15 selsovets under the district's jurisdiction.
  - Krasnokamensky (Краснокаменский)
    - with 9 rural administrations under the district's jurisdiction.
  - Kyrinsky (Кыринский)
    - with 14 selsovets under the district's jurisdiction.
  - Mogochinsky (Могочинский)
    - Towns under the district's jurisdiction:
      - Mogocha (Могоча)
    - Urban-type settlements under the district's jurisdiction:
      - Amazar (Амазар)
      - Davenda (Давенда)
      - Itaka (Итака)
      - Klyuchevsky (Ключевский)
      - Ksenyevka (Ксеньевка)
    - with 2 selsovets under the district's jurisdiction.
  - Nerchinsko-Zavodsky (Нерчинско-Заводский)
    - with 15 rural administrations under the district's jurisdiction.
  - Nerchinsky (Нерчинский)
    - Towns under the district's jurisdiction:
      - Nerchinsk (Нерчинск)
    - Urban-type settlements under the district's jurisdiction:
      - Priiskovy (Приисковый)
    - with 13 selsovets under the district's jurisdiction.
  - Olovyanninsky (Оловяннинский)
    - Urban-type settlements under the district's jurisdiction:
      - Kalanguy (Калангуй)
      - Olovyannaya (Оловянная)
      - Yasnogorsk (Ясногорск)
      - Zolotorechensk (Золотореченск)
    - with 16 selsovets under the district's jurisdiction.
  - Ononsky (Ононский)
    - with 11 rural administrations under the district's jurisdiction.
  - Petrovsk-Zabaykalsky (Петровск-Забайкальский)
    - Urban-type settlements under the district's jurisdiction:
      - Balyaga (Баляга)
      - Novopavlovka (Новопавловка)
      - Tarbagatay (Тарбагатай)
    - with 10 selsovets under the district's jurisdiction.
  - Priargunsky (Приаргунский)
    - Urban-type settlements under the district's jurisdiction:
      - Klichka (Кличка)
      - Priargunsk (Приаргунск)
    - with 11 rural administrations under the district's jurisdiction.
  - Shelopuginsky (Шелопугинский)
    - with 8 rural okrugs under the district's jurisdiction.
  - Shilkinsky (Шилкинский)
    - Towns under the district's jurisdiction:
      - Shilka (Шилка)
    - Urban-type settlements under the district's jurisdiction:
      - Arbagar (Арбагар)
      - Kholbon (Холбон)
      - Pervomaysky (Первомайский)
    - with 11 rural okrugs under the district's jurisdiction.
  - Sretensky (Сретенский)
    - Towns under the district's jurisdiction:
      - Sretensk (Сретенск)
    - Urban-type settlements under the district's jurisdiction:
      - Kokuy (Кокуй)
      - Ust-Karsk (Усть-Карск)
    - with 11 selsovets under the district's jurisdiction.
  - Tungiro-Olyokminsky (Тунгиро-Олёкминский)
    - with 4 selsovets under the district's jurisdiction.
  - Tungokochensky (Тунгокоченский)
    - Urban-type settlements under the district's jurisdiction:
      - Vershino-Darasunsky (Вершино-Дарасунский)
    - with 9 selsovets under the district's jurisdiction.
  - Ulyotovsky (Улётовский)
    - Urban-type settlements under the district's jurisdiction:
      - Drovyanaya (Дровяная)
    - with 9 rural administrations under the district's jurisdiction.
  - Zabaykalsky (Забайкальский)
    - Urban-type settlements under the district's jurisdiction:
      - Zabaykalsk (Забайкальск)
    - with 7 rural municipal entities under the district's jurisdiction.

== See also ==
- Administrative divisions of Agin-Buryat Autonomous Okrug
- Administrative divisions of Zabaykalsky Krai
