= Administrative divisions of Zabaykalsky Krai =

Zabaykalsky Krai Russia
- Administrative center: Chita

Administrative structure (as of 2013)
- Districts: 31
- Cities/towns: 10
- Urban-type settlements: 41
- Selsovets: 0

Municipal structure (as of 2002)
- Rural settlements: 761 (inhabited); 9 (uninhabited)

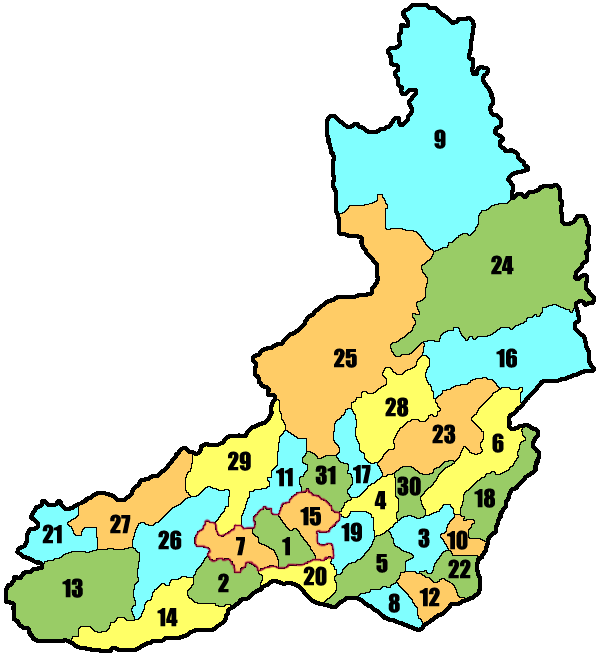
Map of Administrative divisions of Zabaykalsky Krai, with purple lines of Agin-Buryat Okrug (numbered)

Zabaykalsky Krai is a federal subject of Russia.

== Administrative and municipal divisions ==
Map

- ✪ - part of Agin-Buryat Okrug (Аги́нский Буря́тский о́круг)

Division		Structure		OKATO	OKTMO	Urban-type settlement/ district-level town/resort settlement*
Division		Administrative	Municipal	OKATO	OKTMO	Urban-type settlement/ district-level town/resort settlement*
Gorny (Горный)		urban-type settlement (ZATO)	urban okrug	76 585	76 785	
Chita (Чита)		( under Chitinsky)	urban okrug	76 401	76 701	
↳	Chernovsky (Черновский)	( under Chita, Chitinsky)	—N/a	76 401	—N/a	
↳	Ingodinsky (Ингодинский)	( under Chita, Chitinsky)	—N/a	76 401	—N/a	
↳	Tsentralny (Центральный)	( under Chita, Chitinsky)	—N/a	76 401	—N/a	
↳	Zheleznodorozhny (Железнодорожный)	( under Chita, Chitinsky)	—N/a	76 401	—N/a	
Petrovsk-Zabaykalsky (Петровск-Забайкальский)		( under Petrovsk-Zabaykalsky)	urban okrug	76 236	76 715	
✪	Aginsky (Агинский)	special district	district	76 202	76 602	Novoorlovsk (Новоорловск); Orlovsky (Орловский)
✪	Aginskoye (Агинское)	(under Aginsky)	urban okrug	76 202	76 702	
Akshinsky (Акшинский)		district		76 203	76 603	
Alexandrovo-Zavodsky (Александрово-Заводский)		district		76 204	76 604	
Baleysky (Балейский)		district		76 206	76 606	Baley (Балей) town*
Borzinsky (Борзинский)		district		76 209	76 609	Borzya (Борзя) town*; Sherlovaya Gora (Шерловая Гора)
Gazimuro-Zavodsky (Газимуро-Заводский)		district		76 210	76 610	
✪	Duldurginsky (Дульдургинский)	special district	district	76 211	76 611	
Zabaykalsky (Забайкальский)		district		76 212	76 612	Zabaykalsk (Забайкальск)
Kalarsky (Каларский)		district		76 215	76 615	Novaya Chara (Новая Чара)
Kalgansky (Калганский)		district		76 218	76 617	
Karymsky (Карымский)		district		76 220	76 620	Darasun (Дарасун); Karymskoye (Карымское); Kurort Darasun (Курорт Дарасун) resort settlement*
Krasnokamensky (Краснокаменский)		district		76 221	76 621	Krasnokamensk (Краснокаменск) town*
Krasnochikoysky (Красночикойский)		district		76 222	76 622	
Kyrinsky (Кыринский)		district		76 224	76 624	
✪	Mogoytuysky (Могойтуйский)	special district	district	76 225	76 625	Mogoytuy (Могойтуй)
Mogochinsky (Могочинский)		district		76 226	76 626	Mogocha (Могоча) town*; Amazar (Амазар); Davenda (Давенда); Itaka (Итака); Klyuchevsky (Ключевский); Ksenyevka (Ксеньевка)
Nerchinsky (Нерчинский)		district		76 228	76 628	Nerchinsk (Нерчинск) town*; Priiskovy (Приисковый)
Nerchinsko-Zavodsky (Нерчинско-Заводский)		district		76 230	76 630	
Olovyanninsky (Оловяннинский)		district		76 232	76 632	Kalanguy (Калангуй); Olovyannaya (Оловянная); Yasnogorsk (Ясногорск); Zolotorechensk (Золотореченск)
Ononsky (Ононский)		district		76 234	76 634	
Petrovsk-Zabaykalsky (Петровск-Забайкальский)		district		76 236	76 636	Balyaga (Баляга); Novopavlovka (Новопавловка); Tarbagatay (Тарбагатай)
Priargunsky (Приаргунский)		district		76 238	76 638	Klichka (Кличка); Priargunsk (Приаргунск)
Sretensky (Сретенский)		district		76 240	76 640	Sretensk (Сретенск) town*; Kokuy (Кокуй); Ust-Karsk (Усть-Карск)
Tungiro-Olyokminsky (Тунгиро-Олёкминский)		district		76 242	76 642	
Tungokochensky (Тунгокоченский)		district		76 244	76 644	Vershino-Darasunsky (Вершино-Дарасунский)
Ulyotovsky (Улётовский)		district		76 246	76 646	Drovyanaya (Дровяная)
Khiloksky (Хилокский)		district		76 247	76 647	Khilok (Хилок) town*; Mogzon (Могзон)
Chernyshevsky (Чернышевский)		district		76 248	76 648	Aksyonovo-Zilovskoye (Аксёново-Зиловское); Bukachacha (Букачача); Chernyshevsk (Чернышевск); Zhireken (Жирекен)
Chitinsky (Читинский)		district		76 250	76 650	Atamanovka (Атамановка); Novokruchininsky (Новокручининский); Yablonovo (Яблоново)
Shelopuginsky (Шелопугинский)		district		76 252	76 652	
Shilkinsky (Шилкинский)		district		76 254	76 654	Shilka (Шилка) town*; Arbagar (Арбагар); Kholbon (Холбон); Pervomaysky (Первомайский)

== See also ==
- Administrative divisions of Chita Oblast
- Administrative divisions of Agin-Buryat Autonomous Okrug
