= Srednyaya Borzya =

Srednyaya Borzya Средняя Борзя
- Selo
- Location within Zabaykalsky Krai Location within Russia
- Coordinates: 50°54′N 119°29′E
- Country: Russia
- Region: Zabaykalsky Krai
- District: Kalgansky District
- Time zone: UTC+9:00

Srednyaya Borzya (Russian: Средняя Борзя) is a rural locality (a selo) in Kalgansky District, Zabaykalsky Krai, Russia. Population: 289 (2021 census); 452 (2010 census); 608 (2002 census); There are 11 streets in this selo.

== Geography ==
This rural locality is located 42 km from Kalga (the district's administrative centre), 438 km from Chita (capital of Zabaykalsky Krai) and 5,765 km from Moscow. Kadaya is the nearest rural locality.
