= Chingiltuy =

Chingiltuy Чингильтуй
- Selo
- Location within Zabaykalsky Krai Location within Russia
- Coordinates: 50°47′N 119°02′E
- Country: Russia
- Region: Zabaykalsky Krai
- District: Kalgansky District
- Time zone: UTC+9:00

Chingiltuy (Russian: Чингильтуй) is a rural locality (a selo) in Kalgansky District, Zabaykalsky Krai, Russia. Population: 241 (2021 census); 441 (2010 census); 540 (2002 census); There are 7 streets in this selo.

== Geography ==
This rural locality is located 17 km from Kalga (the district's administrative centre), 413 km from Chita (capital of Zabaykalsky Krai) and 5,749 km from Moscow. Zapokrovsky is the nearest rural locality.
