= Pogranichny =

Several inhabited locations in Russia

Pogranichny (Russian: Пограни́чный; masculine), Pogranichnaya (Пограни́чная; feminine), or Pogranichnoye (Пограни́чное; neuter) is the name of several inhabited localities in Russia.

Urban localities

- Pogranichny, Primorsky Krai, an urban-type settlement in Pogranichny District of Primorsky Krai

Rural localities

- Pogranichny, Bagrationovsky District, Kaliningrad Oblast, a settlement in Pogranichny Rural Okrug of Bagrationovsky District of Kaliningrad Oblast
- Pogranichny, Krasnoznamensky District, Kaliningrad Oblast, a settlement in Alexeyevsky Rural Okrug of Krasnoznamensky District of Kaliningrad Oblast
- Pogranichny, Kirov Oblast, a settlement in Biserovsky Rural Okrug of Afanasyevsky District of Kirov Oblast
- Pogranichny, Moscow Oblast, a settlement in Dankovskoye Rural Settlement of Serpukhovsky District of Moscow Oblast
- Pogranichny, Saratov Oblast, a settlement in Khvalynsky District of Saratov Oblast
- Pogranichny, Zabaykalsky Krai, a settlement in Priargunsky District of Zabaykalsky Krai
- Pogranichnoye, Bagrationovsky District, Kaliningrad Oblast, a settlement in Dolgorukovsky Rural Okrug of Bagrationovsky District of Kaliningrad Oblast
- Pogranichnoye, Ozyorsky District, Kaliningrad Oblast, a settlement in Novostroyevsky Rural Okrug of Ozyorsky District of Kaliningrad Oblast
- Pogranichnoye, Omsk Oblast, a village in Alabotinsky Rural Okrug of Russko-Polyansky District of Omsk Oblast
- Pogranichnoye, Penza Oblast, a selo in Pogranichny Selsoviet of Kolyshleysky District of Penza Oblast
- Pogranichnoye, Saratov Oblast, a selo in Novouzensky District of Saratov Oblast
- Pogranichnoye, Volgograd Oblast, a selo in Novinsky Selsoviet of Zhirnovsky District of Volgograd Oblast

== Other uses ==
- Pogranichnaya, historical Russian name for Suifenhe, Heilongjiang, China

== See also ==
- Pogranichnik
