= Verkh-Yagyo =

Verkh-Yagyo Верх-Ягьё
- Selo
- Location within Zabaykalsky Krai Location within Russia
- Coordinates: 51°37′N 117°26′E
- Country: Russia
- Region: Zabaykalsky Krai
- District: Shelopuginsky District
- Time zone: UTC+9:00

Verkh-Yagyo (Russian: Верх-Ягьё) is a rural locality (a selo) in Shelopuginsky District, Zabaykalsky Krai, Russia. Population: 105 (2021 census); 140 (2010 census); There are 3 streets in this selo.

== Geography ==
This rural locality is located 9 km from Shelopugino (the district's administrative centre), 276 km from Chita (capital of Zabaykalsky Krai) and 5,530 km from Moscow. Glinyanka is the nearest rural locality.
