= Khara-Byrka =

Khara-Byrka Хара-Бырка
- Selo
- Location within Zabaykalsky Krai Location within Russia
- Coordinates: 50°57′N 115°55′E
- Country: Russia
- Region: Zabaykalsky Krai
- District: Olovyanninsky District
- Time zone: UTC+9:00

Khara-Byrka (Russian: Хара-Бырка) is a rural locality (a selo) in Olovyanninsky District, Zabaykalsky Krai, Russia. Population: 261 (2021 census); 568 (2010 census); There are 6 streets in this selo.

== Geography ==
This rural locality is located 24 km from Olovyannaya (the district's administrative centre), 208 km from Chita (capital of Zabaykalsky Krai) and 5,511 km from Moscow. Sredny Sharanay is the nearest rural locality.
