= Gorda, Zabaykalsky Krai =

Gorda Горда
- Selo
- Location within Zabaykalsky Krai Location within Russia
- Coordinates: 50°10′N 118°53′E
- Country: Russia
- Region: Zabaykalsky Krai
- District: Priargunsky District
- Time zone: UTC+9:00

Gorda (Russian: Горда) is a rural locality (a selo) in Priargunsky District, Zabaykalsky Krai, Russia. Population: 86 (2021 census); 102 (2010 census); 158 (2002 census); There are 5 streets in this selo.

== Geography ==
This rural locality is located 26 km from Priargunsk (the district's administrative centre), 436 km from Chita (capital of Zabaykalsky Krai) and 5,822 km from Moscow. Molodyozhny is the nearest rural locality.
