= Dolgokycha =

Dolgokycha Долгокыча
- Selo
- Location within Zabaykalsky Krai Location within Russia
- Coordinates: 51°04′N 116°25′E
- Country: Russia
- Region: Zabaykalsky Krai
- District: Olovyanninsky District
- Time zone: UTC+9:00

Dolgokycha (Russian: Долгокыча) is a rural locality (a selo) in Olovyanninsky District, Zabaykalsky Krai, Russia. Population: 580 (2021 census); 782 (2010 census); 1,004 (2002 census); There are 9 streets in this selo.

== Geography ==
This rural locality is located 61 km from Olovyannaya (the district's administrative centre), 230 km from Chita (capital of Zabaykalsky Krai) and 5,531 km from Moscow. Burulyatuy is the nearest rural locality.
