= Selinda =

Selinda Селинда
- Selo
- Location within Zabaykalsky Krai Location within Russia
- Coordinates: 50°00′N 118°00′E
- Country: Russia
- Region: Zabaykalsky Krai
- District: Priargunsky District
- Time zone: UTC+9:00

Selinda (Russian: Селинда) is a rural locality (a selo) in Priargunsky District, Zabaykalsky Krai, Russia. Population: 155 (2021 census); 271 (2010 census); 409 (2002 census); There are 13 streets in this selo.

== Geography ==
This rural locality is located 58 km from Priargunsk (the district's administrative centre), 378 km from Chita (capital of Zabaykalsky Krai) and 5,730 km from Moscow. Savvo-Borzya is the nearest rural locality.
