= Derevtsovo =

Derevtsovo Деревцово
- Selo
- Location within Zabaykalsky Krai Location within Russia
- Coordinates: 51°52′N 117°50′E
- Country: Russia
- Region: Zabaykalsky Krai
- District: Shelopuginsky District
- Time zone: UTC+9:00

Derevtsovo (Russian: Деревцово) is a rural locality (a selo) in Shelopuginsky District, Zabaykalsky Krai, Russia. Population: 82 (2021 census); 101 (2010 census); There are 4 streets in this selo.

== Geography ==
This rural locality is located 31 km from Shelopugino (the district's administrative centre), 298 km from Chita (capital of Zabaykalsky Krai) and 5,524 km from Moscow. Maly Tontoy is the nearest rural locality.
