= Bura, Kalgansky District, Zabaykalsky Krai =

Bura Бура
- Selo
- Location within Zabaykalsky Krai Location within Russia
- Coordinates: 50°45′N 119°26′E
- Country: Russia
- Region: Zabaykalsky Krai
- District: Kalgansky District
- Time zone: UTC+9:00

Bura (Russian: Бура) is a rural locality (a selo) in Kalgansky District, Zabaykalsky Krai, Russia. Population: 518 (2021 census); 629 (2010 census); 817 (2002 census); There are 5 streets in this selo.

== Geography ==
This rural locality is located 44 km from Kalga (the district's administrative centre), 442 km from Chita (capital of Zabaykalsky Krai) and 5,784 km from Moscow. Zapokrovsky Rudnik is the nearest rural locality.
