= Verkhny Kalgukan =

Verkhny Kalgukan Верхний Калгукан
- Selo
- Location within Zabaykalsky Krai Location within Russia
- Coordinates: 50°49′N 118°47′E
- Country: Russia
- Region: Zabaykalsky Krai
- District: Kalgansky District
- Time zone: UTC+9:00

Verkhny Kalgukan (Russian: Верхний Калгукан) is a rural locality (a selo) in Kalgansky District, Zabaykalsky Krai, Russia. Population: 231 (2021 census); 325 (2010 census); 399 (2002 census); There are 8 streets in this selo.

== Geography ==
This rural locality is located 14 km from Kalga (the district's administrative centre), 395 km from Chita (capital of Zabaykalsky Krai) and 5,729 km from Moscow. Nizhny Kalgukan is the nearest rural locality.
