= Nizhny Kalgukan =

Nizhny Kalgukan Нижний Калгукан
- Selo
- Location within Zabaykalsky Krai Location within Russia
- Coordinates: 50°44′N 118°54′E
- Country: Russia
- Region: Zabaykalsky Krai
- District: Kalgansky District
- Time zone: UTC+9:00

Nizhny Kalgukan (Russian: Нижний Калгукан) is a rural locality (a selo) in Kalgansky District, Zabaykalsky Krai, Russia. Population: 546 (2021 census); 749 (2010 census); 872 (2002 census); There are 9 streets in this selo.

== Geography ==
This rural locality is located 20 km from Kalga (the district's administrative centre), 407 km from Chita (capital of Zabaykalsky Krai) and 5,747 km from Moscow. Chingiltuy is the nearest rural locality.
