= Ulan, Zabaykalsky Krai =

Ulan Улан
- Selo
- Location within Zabaykalsky Krai Location within Russia
- Coordinates: 50°28′N 118°55′E
- Country: Russia
- Region: Zabaykalsky Krai
- District: Priargunsky District
- Time zone: UTC+9:00

Ulan (Russian: Улан) is a rural locality (a selo) in Priargunsky District, Zabaykalsky Krai, Russia. Population: 319 (2021 census); 353 (2010 census); 425 (2002 census); There are 10 streets in this selo.

== Geography ==
This rural locality is located 17 km from Priargunsk (the district's administrative centre), 421 km from Chita (capital of Zabaykalsky Krai) and 5,784 km from Moscow. Talman-Borzya is the nearest rural locality.
