= Norinsk =

Norinsk Норинск
- Settlement
- Location within Zabaykalsky Krai Location within Russia
- Coordinates: 50°40′N 119°02′E
- Country: Russia
- Region: Zabaykalsky Krai
- District: Priargunsky District
- Time zone: UTC+9:00

Norinsk (Russian: Норинск) is a rural locality (a settlement) in Priargunsky District, Zabaykalsky Krai, Russia. Population: 162 (2021 census); 180 (2010 census); There are 8 streets in this settlement.

== Geography ==
This rural locality is located 34 km from Priargunsk (the district's administrative centre), 419 km from Chita (capital of Zabaykalsky Krai) and 5,766 km from Moscow. Pogranichny is the nearest rural locality.
