= Chongul =

Chongul Чонгуль
- Selo
- Location within Zabaykalsky Krai Location within Russia
- Coordinates: 51°57′N 117°43′E
- Country: Russia
- Region: Zabaykalsky Krai
- District: Shelopuginsky District
- Time zone: UTC+9:00

Chongul (Russian: Чонгуль) is a rural locality (a selo) in Shelopuginsky District, Zabaykalsky Krai, Russia. Population: 55 (2010 census); 85 (2002 census); There are 3 streets in this selo.

== Geography ==
This rural locality is located 36 km from Shelopugino (the district's administrative centre), 290 km from Chita (capital of Zabaykalsky Krai) and 5,506 km from Moscow. Mironovo is the nearest rural locality.
