= Novotsurukhaytuy =

Novotsurukhaytuy Новоцурухайтуй
- Selo
- Location within Zabaykalsky Krai Location within Russia
- Coordinates: 50°23′N 119°06′E
- Country: Russia
- Region: Zabaykalsky Krai
- District: Priargunsky District
- Time zone: UTC+9:00

Novotsurukhaytuy (Russian: Новоцурухайтуй) is a rural locality (a selo) in Priargunsky District, Zabaykalsky Krai, Russia. Population: 1,656 (2021 census); 1,792 (2010 census); 1,920 (2002 census); There are 15 streets in this selo.

== Geography ==
This rural locality is located 3 km from Priargunsk (the district's administrative centre), 438 km from Chita (capital of Zabaykalsky Krai) and 5,808 km from Moscow. Priargunsk is the nearest rural locality.
