= Kopun =

Kopun Копунь
- Selo
- Location within Zabaykalsky Krai Location within Russia
- Coordinates: 51°53′N 117°38′E
- Country: Russia
- Region: Zabaykalsky Krai
- District: Shelopuginsky District
- Time zone: UTC+9:00

Kopun (Russian: Копунь) is a rural locality (a selo) in Shelopuginsky District, Zabaykalsky Krai, Russia. Population: 492 (2010 census); 591 (2002 census); There are 11 streets in this selo.

== Geography ==
This rural locality is located 27 km from Shelopugino (the district's administrative centre), 285 km from Chita (capital of Zabaykalsky Krai) and 5,509 km from Moscow. Mironovo is the nearest rural locality.
