= Chuprovo, Zabaykalsky Krai =

Chuprovo Чупрово
- Selo
- Location within Zabaykalsky Krai Location within Russia
- Coordinates: 50°59′N 118°59′E
- Country: Russia
- Region: Zabaykalsky Krai
- District: Kalgansky District
- Time zone: UTC+9:00

Chuprovo (Russian: Чупрово) is a rural locality (a selo) in Kalgansky District, Zabaykalsky Krai, Russia. Population: 386 (2021 census); 524 (2010 census); 581 (2002 census); There are 5 streets in this selo.

== Geography ==
This rural locality is located 10 km from Kalga (the district's administrative centre), 402 km from Chita (capital of Zabaykalsky Krai) and 5,721 km from Moscow. Yavlenka is the nearest rural locality.
