= Ononsk =

Ononsk Ононск
- Selo
- Location within Zabaykalsky Krai Location within Russia
- Coordinates: 50°59′N 115°34′E
- Country: Russia
- Region: Zabaykalsky Krai
- District: Olovyanninsky District
- Time zone: UTC+9:00

Ononsk (Russian: Ононск) is a rural locality (a selo) in Olovyanninsky District, Zabaykalsky Krai, Russia. Population: 529 (2021 census); 635 (2010 census); There are 11 streets in this selo.

== Geography ==
This rural locality is located 5 km from Olovyannaya (the district's administrative centre), 186 km from Chita (capital of Zabaykalsky Krai) and 5,483 km from Moscow. Kulinda is the nearest rural locality.
