= Vershino-Shakhtaminsky =

Vershino-Shakhtaminsky Вершино-Шахтаминский
- Selo
- Location within Zabaykalsky Krai Location within Russia
- Coordinates: 51°17′N 117°53′E
- Country: Russia
- Region: Zabaykalsky Krai
- District: Shelopuginsky District
- Time zone: UTC+9:00

Vershino-Shakhtaminsky (Russian: Вершино-Шахтаминский) is a rural locality (a selo) in Shelopuginsky District, Zabaykalsky Krai, Russia. Population: 1,002 (2021 census); 1,384 (2010 census); There are 26 streets in this selo.

== Geography ==
This rural locality is located 47 km from Shelopugino (the district's administrative centre), 317 km from Chita (capital of Zabaykalsky Krai) and 5,605 km from Moscow. Srednyaya Shakhtama is the nearest rural locality.
