= Kozlovo, Zabaykalsky Krai =

Kozlovo Козлово
- Selo
- Location within Zabaykalsky Krai Location within Russia
- Coordinates: 51°12′N 118°55′E
- Country: Russia
- Region: Zabaykalsky Krai
- District: Kalgansky District
- Time zone: UTC+9:00

Kozlovo (Russian: Козлово) is a rural locality (a selo) in Kalgansky District, Zabaykalsky Krai, Russia. Population: 136 (2021 census); 175 (2010 census); 218 (2002 census); There are 5 streets in this selo.

== Geography ==
This rural locality is located 31 km from Kalga (the district's administrative centre), 389 km from Chita (capital of Zabaykalsky Krai) and 5,687 km from Moscow. Zolotonosha is the nearest rural locality.
