= Pogadayaevo =

Pogadayaevo Погадаево
- Selo
- Location within Zabaykalsky Krai Location within Russia
- Coordinates: 50°19′N 118°40′E
- Country: Russia
- Region: Zabaykalsky Krai
- District: Priargunsky District
- Time zone: UTC+9:00

Pogadayaevo (Russian: Погадаево) is a rural locality (a selo) in Priargunsky District, Zabaykalsky Krai, Russia. Population: 495 (2021 census); 573 (2010 census); 677 (2002 census); There are 6 streets in this selo.

== Geography ==
This rural locality is located 30 km from Priargunsk (the district's administrative centre), 413 km from Chita (capital of Zabaykalsky Krai) and 5,785 km from Moscow. Dosatuy is the nearest rural locality.
