= Glinyanka =

Glinyanka Глинянка
- Selo
- Location within Zabaykalsky Krai Location within Russia
- Coordinates: 51°39′N 117°24′E
- Country: Russia
- Region: Zabaykalsky Krai
- District: Shelopuginsky District
- Time zone: UTC+9:00

Glinyanka (Russian: Глинянка) is a rural locality (a selo) in Shelopuginsky District, Zabaykalsky Krai, Russia. Population: 129 (2021 census); 184 (2010 census); There are 4 streets in this selo.

== Geography ==
This rural locality is located 10 km from Shelopugino (the district's administrative centre), 273 km from Chita (capital of Zabaykalsky Krai) and 5,523 km from Moscow. Verkh-Yagyo is the nearest rural locality.
