= Karaksar, Zabaykalsky Krai =

Karaksar Караксар
- Selo
- Location within Zabaykalsky Krai Location within Russia
- Coordinates: 51°15′N 115°57′E
- Country: Russia
- Region: Zabaykalsky Krai
- District: Olovyanninsky District
- Time zone: UTC+9:00

Karaksar (Russian: Караксар) is a rural locality (a selo) in Olovyanninsky District, Zabaykalsky Krai, Russia. Population: 137 (2010 census); 173 (2002 census); There are 4 streets in this selo.

== Geography ==
This rural locality is located 44 km from Olovyannaya (the district's administrative centre), 191 km from Chita (capital of Zabaykalsky Krai) and 5,473 km from Moscow. Borzhigantay is the nearest rural locality.
