= Administrative divisions of Agin-Buryat Autonomous Okrug =

Former administrative division of Russian federal subject

Agin-Buryat Autonomous Okrug Russia
- Administrative centre: Aginskoye

Administrative structure (as of February 29, 2008)
- Districts: 3
- Cities/towns: 0
- Urban-type settlements: 4
- Selsovets: 35

Municipal structure (as of 2002)
- Rural settlements: 62

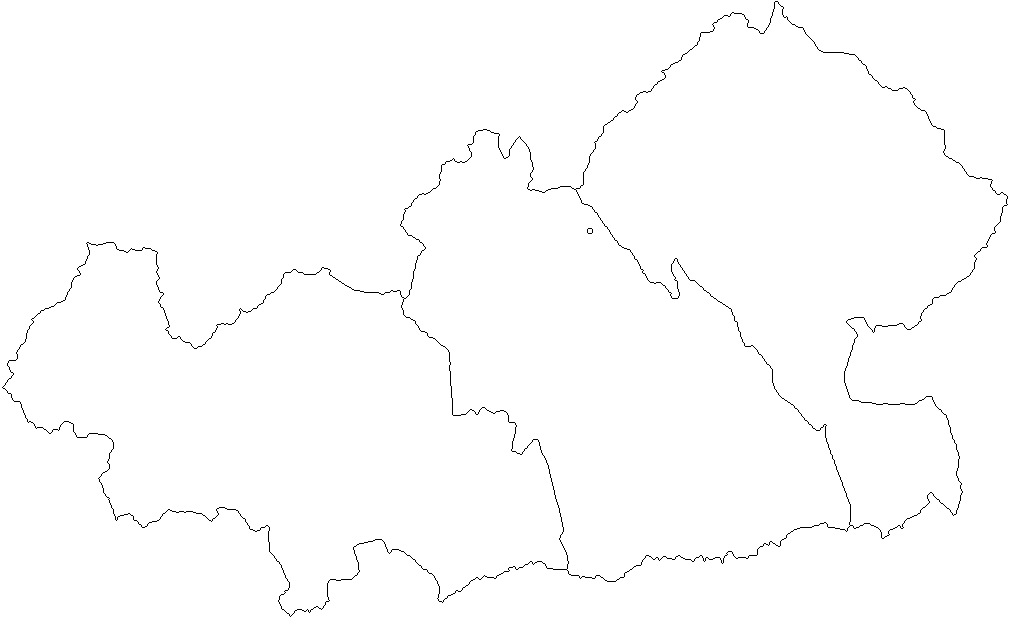
Map of the Agin-Buryat Autonomous Okrug (From left, Clockwise:Duldurginsky District, Aginsky District & Mogoytuysky District)

Agin-Buryat Autonomous Okrug was a federal subject of Russia until February 29, 2008. On March 1, 2008, it was merged with Chita Oblast to form Zabaykalsky Krai. During the transitional period of 2008–2009, it retained a special status within Zabaykalsky Krai.

- Districts:
  - Aginsky (Агинский)
    - Urban-type settlements under the district's jurisdiction:
      - Aginskoye (Агинское) (administrative center)
      - Novoorlovsk (Новоорловск)
      - Orlovsky (Орловский)
    - with 11 rural municipal formations under the district's jurisdiction.
  - Duldurginsky (Дульдургинский)
    - with 10 rural municipal formations under the district's jurisdiction.
  - Mogoytuysky (Могойтуйский)
    - Urban-type settlements under the district's jurisdiction:
      - Mogoytuy (Могойтуй)
    - with 14 rural municipal formations under the district's jurisdiction.

== See also ==
- Administrative divisions of Chita Oblast
- Administrative divisions of Zabaykalsky Krai
