= Nizhnyaya Shakhtama =

Nizhnyaya Shakhtama Нижняя Шахтама
- Selo
- Location within Zabaykalsky Krai Location within Russia
- Coordinates: 51°23′N 117°41′E
- Country: Russia
- Region: Zabaykalsky Krai
- District: Shelopuginsky District
- Time zone: UTC+9:00

Nizhnyaya Shakhtama (Russian: Нижняя Шахтама) is a rural locality (a selo) in Shelopuginsky District, Zabaykalsky Krai, Russia. Population: 264 (2010 census); 279 (2002 census); There are 5 streets in this selo.

== Geography ==
This rural locality is located 31 km from Shelopugino (the district's administrative centre), 300 km from Chita (capital of Zabaykalsky Krai) and 5,578 km from Moscow. Srednyaay Shakhtama is the nearest rural locality.
