= Byrka, Priargunsky District, Zabaykalsky Krai =

Byrka Бырка
- Selo
- Location within Zabaykalsky Krai Location within Russia
- Coordinates: 50°38′N 118°32′E
- Country: Russia
- Region: Zabaykalsky Krai
- District: Priargunsky District
- Time zone: UTC+9:00

Byrka (Russian: Бырка) is a rural locality (a selo) in Priargunsky District, Zabaykalsky Krai, Russia. Population: 822 (2021 census); 1,024 (2010 census); 1,341 (2002 census); There are 15 streets in this selo.

== Geography ==
This rural locality is located 49 km from Priargunsk (the district's administrative centre), 388 km from Chita (capital of Zabaykalsky Krai) and 5,735 km from Moscow. Savvo-Borzya is the nearest rural locality.
