= Kuti, Zabaykalsky Krai =

Kuti Кути
- Selo
- Location within Zabaykalsky Krai Location within Russia
- Coordinates: 50°05′N 119°10′E
- Country: Russia
- Region: Zabaykalsky Krai
- District: Priargunsky District
- Time zone: UTC+9:00

Kuti (Russian: Кути) is a rural locality (a selo) in Priargunsky District, Zabaykalsky Krai, Russia. Population: 120 (2021 census); 116 (2010 census); 159 (2002 census); There are 6 streets in this selo.

== Geography ==
This rural locality is located 31 km from Priargunsk (the district's administrative centre), 459 km from Chita (capital of Zabaykalsky Krai) and 5,852 km from Moscow. Starotsurukhaytuy is the nearest rural locality.
