= Shiviya, Shelopuginsky District, Zabaykalsky Krai =

Shiviya Шивия
- Selo
- Location within Zabaykalsky Krai Location within Russia
- Coordinates: 51°53′N 117°25′E
- Country: Russia
- Region: Zabaykalsky Krai
- District: Shelopuginsky District
- Time zone: UTC+9:00

Shiviya (Russian: Шивия) is a rural locality (a selo) in Shelopuginsky District, Zabaykalsky Krai, Russia. Population: 301 (2021 census); 384 (2010 census); There are 7 streets in this selo.

== Geography ==
This rural locality is located 28 km from Shelopugino (the district's administrative centre), 270 km from Chita (capital of Zabaykalsky Krai) and 5,494 km from Moscow. Dayakon is the nearest rural locality.
