= Sivachi =

Sivachi Сивачи
- Settlement
- Location within Zabaykalsky Krai Location within Russia
- Coordinates: 51°28′N 117°41′E
- Country: Russia
- Region: Zabaykalsky Krai
- District: Shelopuginsky District
- Time zone: UTC+9:00

Sivachi (Russian: Сивачи) is a rural locality (a settlement) in Shelopuginsky District, Zabaykalsky Krai, Russia. Population: 147 (2021 census); 179 (2010 census); There is 1 street in this settlement.

== Geography ==
This rural locality is located 22 km from Shelopugino (the district's administrative centre), 297 km from Chita (capital of Zabaykalsky Krai) and 5,567 km from Moscow. Undinskiye Kavykuchi is the nearest rural locality.
