= Verkhny Tasurkay =

Verkhny Tasurkay Верхний Тасуркай
- Selo
- Location within Zabaykalsky Krai Location within Russia
- Coordinates: 50°25′N 118°20′E
- Country: Russia
- Region: Zabaykalsky Krai
- District: Priargunsky District
- Time zone: UTC+9:00

Verkhny Tasurkay (Russian: Верхний Тасуркай) is a rural locality (a selo) in Priargunsky District, Zabaykalsky Krai, Russia. Population: 190 (2021 census); 255 (2010 census); 345 (2002 census); There are 4 streets in this selo.

== Geography ==
This rural locality is located 54 km from Priargunsk (the district's administrative centre), 386 km from Chita (capital of Zabaykalsky Krai) and 5,749 km from Moscow. Ust-Tasurkay is the nearest rural locality.
