= Srednyaya Shakhtama =

Srednyaya Shakhtama Средняя Шахтама
- Selo
- Location within Zabaykalsky Krai Location within Russia
- Coordinates: 51°20′N 117°44′E
- Country: Russia
- Region: Zabaykalsky Krai
- District: Shelopuginsky District
- Time zone: UTC+9:00

Srednyaya Shakhtama (Russian: Средняя Шахтама) is a rural locality (a selo) in Shelopuginsky District, Zabaykalsky Krai, Russia. Population: 84 (2010 census); 56 (2002 census); There is 1 street in this selo.

== Geography ==
This rural locality is located 36 km from Shelopugino (the district's administrative centre), 304 km from Chita (capital of Zabaykalsky Krai) and 5,586 km from Moscow. Nizhnyaya Shakhtama is the nearest rural locality.
