= Novoivanovka, Priargunsky District, Zabaykalsky Krai =

Novoivanovka Новоивановка
- Selo
- Location within Zabaykalsky Krai Location within Russia
- Coordinates: 50°22′N 118°09′E
- Country: Russia
- Region: Zabaykalsky Krai
- District: Priargunsky District
- Time zone: UTC+9:00

Novoivanovka (Russian: Новоивановка) is a rural locality (a selo) in Priargunsky District, Zabaykalsky Krai, Russia. Population: 217 (2021 census); 274 (2010 census); 340 (2002 census); There are 7 streets in this selo.

== Geography ==
This rural locality is located 66 km from Priargunsk (the district's administrative centre), 378 km from Chita (capital of Zabaykalsky Krai) and 5,743 km from Moscow. Urulyunguy is the nearest rural locality.
