= Byrka =

Byrka Бырка
- Settlement
- Location within Zabaykalsky Krai Location within Russia
- Coordinates: 50°44′N 115°57′E
- Country: Russia
- Region: Zabaykalsky Krai
- District: Olovyanninsky District
- Time zone: UTC+9:00

Byrka (Russian: Бырка) is a rural locality (a settlement) in Olovyanninsky District, Zabaykalsky Krai, Russia. Population: 336 (2021 census); 448 (2010 census); 431 (2002 census); There are 6 streets in this settlement.

== Geography ==
This rural locality is located 35 km from Olovyannaya (the district's administrative centre), 225 km from Chita (capital of Zabaykalsky Krai) and 5,540 km from Moscow. Mirnaya is the nearest rural locality.
