= Banshchikovo =

Banshchikovo Банщиково
- Selo
- Location within Zabaykalsky Krai Location within Russia
- Coordinates: 51°35′N 117°39′E
- Country: Russia
- Region: Zabaykalsky Krai
- District: Shelopuginsky District
- Time zone: UTC+9:00

Banshchikovo (Russian: Банщиково) is a rural locality (a selo) in Shelopuginsky District, Zabaykalsky Krai, Russia. Population: 93 (2021 census); 124 (2010 census); There are 3 streets in this selo.

== Geography ==
This rural locality is located 10 km from Shelopugino (the district's administrative centre), 292 km from Chita (capital of Zabaykalsky Krai) and 5,550 km from Moscow. Malyshevo is the nearest rural locality.
