= Yedineniye, Zabaykalsky Krai =

Yedineniye Единение
- Selo
- Location within Zabaykalsky Krai Location within Russia
- Coordinates: 51°10′N 115°53′E
- Country: Russia
- Region: Zabaykalsky Krai
- District: Olovyanninsky District
- Time zone: UTC+9:00

Yedineniye (Russian: Единение) is a rural locality (a selo) in Olovyanninsky District, Zabaykalsky Krai, Russia. Population: 359 (2021 census); 480 (2010 census); 621 (2002 census); There are 11 streets in this selo.

== Geography ==
This rural locality is located 34 km from Olovyannaya (the district's administrative centre), 192 km from Chita (capital of Zabaykalsky Krai) and 5,480 km from Moscow. Borzhigantay is the nearest rural locality.
