= Komkay =

Komkay Комкай
- Selo
- Location within Zabaykalsky Krai Location within Russia
- Coordinates: 51°11′N 116°21′E
- Country: Russia
- Region: Zabaykalsky Krai
- District: Olovyanninsky District
- Time zone: UTC+9:00

Komkay (Russian: Комкай) is a rural locality (a selo) in Olovyanninsky District, Zabaykalsky Krai, Russia. Population: 129 (2010 census); 162 (2002 census); There are 2 streets in this selo.

== Geography ==
This rural locality is located 61 km from Olovyannaya (the district's administrative centre), 220 km from Chita (capital of Zabaykalsky Krai) and 5,511 km from Moscow. Ulyatuy is the nearest rural locality.
