= Vereya =

Vereya (Russian: Верея) is the name of several inhabited localities in Russia.

Urban localities

- Vereya, Naro-Fominsky District, Moscow Oblast, a town in Naro-Fominsky District of Moscow Oblast

Rural localities

- Vereya, Orekhovo-Zuyevsky District, Moscow Oblast, a settlement in Vereyskoye Rural Settlement of Orekhovo-Zuyevsky District in Moscow Oblast
- Vereya, Ramensky District, Moscow Oblast, a village in Vereyskoye Rural Settlement of Ramensky District in Moscow Oblast
- Vereya, Ryazan Oblast, a village in Oskinsky Rural Okrug of Klepikovsky District in Ryazan Oblast
- Vereya, Zabaykalsky Krai, a settlement in Priargunsky District of Zabaykalsky Krai

== See also ==
- Verkhnyaya Vereya
