= Kulinda, Olovyanninsky District, Zabaykalsky Krai =

Kulinda Кулинда
- Selo
- Location within Zabaykalsky Krai Location within Russia
- Coordinates: 50°57′N 115°36′E
- Country: Russia
- Region: Zabaykalsky Krai
- District: Olovyanninsky District
- Time zone: UTC+9:00

Kulinda (Russian: Кулинда) is a rural locality (a selo) in Olovyanninsky District, Zabaykalsky Krai, Russia. Population: 179 (2021 census); 212 (2010 census); 241 (2002 census); There are 3 streets in this selo.

== Geography ==
This rural locality is located 3 km from Olovyannaya (the district's administrative centre), 191 km from Chita (capital of Zabaykalsky Krai) and 5,489 km from Moscow. Olovyannaya is the nearest rural locality.
