= Ulan-Tsatsyk =

Ulan-Tsatsyk Улан-Цацык
- Selo
- Location within Zabaykalsky Krai Location within Russia
- Coordinates: 50°51′N 116°13′E
- Country: Russia
- Region: Zabaykalsky Krai
- District: Olovyanninsky District
- Time zone: UTC+9:00

Ulan-Tsatsyk (Russian: Улан-Цацык) is a rural locality (a selo) in Olovyanninsky District, Zabaykalsky Krai, Russia. Population: 279 (2021 census); 462 (2010 census); There are 8 streets in this selo.

== Geography ==
This rural locality is located 46 km from Olovyannaya (the district's administrative centre), 231 km from Chita (capital of Zabaykalsky Krai) and 5,544 km from Moscow. Mirnaya is the nearest rural locality.
