= Verkhny Tergen =

Verkhny Tergen Верхний Тергень
- Selo
- Location within Zabaykalsky Krai Location within Russia
- Coordinates: 51°44′N 117°21′E
- Country: Russia
- Region: Zabaykalsky Krai
- District: Shelopuginsky District
- Time zone: UTC+9:00

Verkhny Tergen (Russian: Верхний Тергень) is a rural locality (a selo) in Shelopuginsky District, Zabaykalsky Krai, Russia. Population: 82 (2021 census); 106 (2010 census); There are 4 streets in this selo.

== Geography ==
This rural locality is located 17 km from Shelopugino (the district's administrative centre), 267 km from Chita (capital of Zabaykalsky Krai) and 5,509 km from Moscow. Daya is the nearest rural locality.
