= Dayakon =

Dayakon Даякон
- Selo
- Location within Zabaykalsky Krai Location within Russia
- Coordinates: 51°49′N 117°32′E
- Country: Russia
- Region: Zabaykalsky Krai
- District: Shelopuginsky District
- Time zone: UTC+9:00

Dayakon (Russian: Даякон) is a rural locality (a selo) in Shelopuginsky District, Zabaykalsky Krai, Russia. Population: 195 (2021 census); 199 (2010 census); There is 1 street in this selo.

== Geography ==
This rural locality is located 19 km from Shelopugino (the district's administrative centre), 279 km from Chita (capital of Zabaykalsky Krai) and 5,511 km from Moscow. Daya is the nearest rural locality.
