= Antiya =

Antiya Антия
- Selo
- Location within Zabaykalsky Krai Location within Russia
- Coordinates: 50°57′N 116°34′E
- Country: Russia
- Region: Zabaykalsky Krai
- District: Olovyanninsky District
- Time zone: UTC+9:00

Antiya (Russian: Антия) is a rural locality (a selo) in Olovyanninsky District, Zabaykalsky Krai, Russia. Population: 243 (2021 census); 279 (2010 census); 347 (2002 census); There are 4 streets in this selo.

== Geography ==
This rural locality is located 70 km from Olovyannaya (the district's administrative centre), 247 km from Chita (capital of Zabaykalsky Krai) and 5,557 km from Moscow. Kalanguy is the nearest rural locality.
