= Dono, Zabaykalsky Krai =

Dono Доно
- Selo
- Location within Zabaykalsky Krai Location within Russia
- Coordinates: 50°53′N 118°35′E
- Country: Russia
- Region: Zabaykalsky Krai
- District: Kalgansky District
- Time zone: UTC+9:00

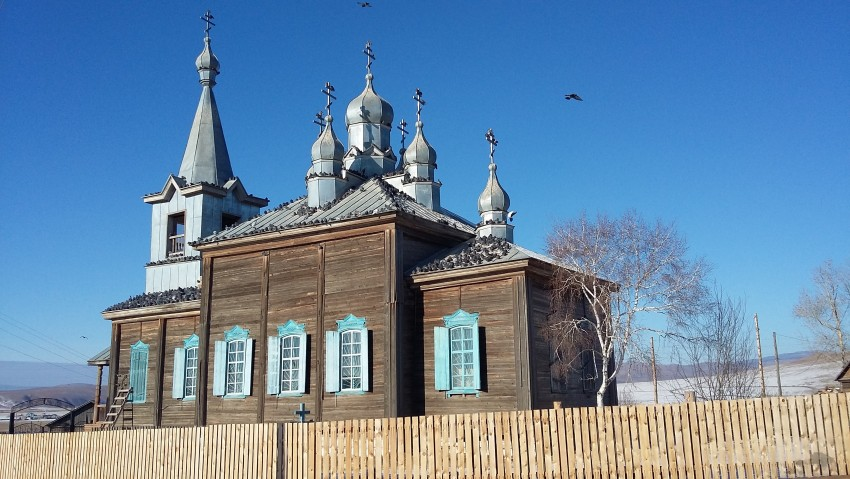
St Nicolas Russian Orthodox church in Dono village

Dono (Russian: Доно) is a rural locality (a selo) in Kalgansky District, Zabaykalsky Krai, Russia. Population: 632 (2021 census); 800 (2010 census); 978 (2002 census); There are 12 streets in this selo.

== Geography ==
This rural locality is located 21 km from Kalga (the district's administrative centre), 379 km from Chita (capital of Zabaykalsky Krai) and 5,706 km from Moscow. Bogoslovsk is the nearest rural locality.
