= Daya, Zabaykalsky Krai =

Daya Дая
- Selo
- Location within Zabaykalsky Krai Location within Russia
- Coordinates: 51°47′N 117°26′E
- Country: Russia
- Region: Zabaykalsky Krai
- District: Shelopuginsky District
- Time zone: UTC+9:00

Daya (Russian: Дая) is a rural locality (a selo) in Shelopuginsky District, Zabaykalsky Krai, Russia. Population: 200 (2021 census); 200 (2010 census); There are 4 streets in this selo.

== Geography ==
This rural locality is located 17 km from Shelopugino (the district's administrative centre), 273 km from Chita (capital of Zabaykalsky Krai) and 5,508 km from Moscow. Dayakon is the nearest rural locality.
