= Malyshevo, Zabaykalsky Krai =

Malyshevo Малышево
- Selo
- Location within Zabaykalsky Krai Location within Russia
- Coordinates: 51°32′N 117°40′E
- Country: Russia
- Region: Zabaykalsky Krai
- District: Shelopuginsky District
- Time zone: UTC+9:00

Malyshevo (Russian: Малышево) is a rural locality (a selo) in Shelopuginsky District, Zabaykalsky Krai, Russia. Population: 120 (2021 census); 146 (2010 census); There are 4 streets in this selo.

== Geography ==
This rural locality is located 15 km from Shelopugino (the district's administrative centre), 294 km from Chita (capital of Zabaykalsky Krai) and 5,557 km from Moscow. Banshchikovo is the nearest rural locality.
