= Urulyunguy, Priargunsky District, Zabaykalsky Krai =

Urulyunguy Урулюнгуй
- Selo
- Location within Zabaykalsky Krai Location within Russia
- Coordinates: 50°27′N 118°31′E
- Country: Russia
- Region: Zabaykalsky Krai
- District: Priargunsky District
- Time zone: UTC+9:00

Urulyunguy (Russian: Урулюнгуй) is a rural locality (a selo) in Priargunsky District, Zabaykalsky Krai, Russia. Population: 724 (2021 census); 805 (2010 census); 170 (2002 census); There are 10 streets in this selo.

== Geography ==
This rural locality is located 42 km from Priargunsk (the district's administrative centre), 396 km from Chita (capital of Zabaykalsky Krai) and 5,756 km from Moscow. Dosatuy is the nearest rural locality.
