= Ust-Tasurkay =

Ust-Tasurkay Усть-Тасуркай
- Selo
- Location within Zabaykalsky Krai Location within Russia
- Coordinates: 50°21′N 118°25′E
- Country: Russia
- Region: Zabaykalsky Krai
- District: Priargunsky District
- Time zone: UTC+9:00

Ust-Tasurkay (Russian: Усть-Тасуркай) is a rural locality (a selo) in Priargunsky District, Zabaykalsky Krai, Russia. Population: 379 (2021 census); 469 (2010 census); 559 (2002 census); There are 12 streets in this selo.

== Geography ==
This rural locality is located 48 km from Priargunsk (the district's administrative centre), 395 km from Chita (capital of Zabaykalsky Krai) and 5,763 km from Moscow. Verkhny Tasurkay is the nearest rural locality.
