= Starotsurukhaytuy =

Starotsurukhaytuy Староцурухайтуй
- Selo
- Location within Zabaykalsky Krai Location within Russia
- Coordinates: 50°12′N 119°19′E
- Country: Russia
- Region: Zabaykalsky Krai
- District: Priargunsky District
- Time zone: UTC+9:00

Starotsurukhaytuy (Russian: Староцурухайтуй) is a rural locality (a selo) in Priargunsky District, Zabaykalsky Krai, Russia. Population: 896 (2021 census); 963 (2010 census); 993 (2002 census); There are 20 streets in this selo.

== Geography ==
This rural locality is located 25 km from Priargunsk (the district's administrative centre), 462 km from Chita (capital of Zabaykalsky Krai) and 5,849 km from Moscow. Kuti is the nearest rural locality.
