= Duroy, Priargunsky District, Zabaykalsky Krai =

Duroy Дурой
- Selo
- Location within Zabaykalsky Krai Location within Russia
- Coordinates: 50°00′N 118°55′E
- Country: Russia
- Region: Zabaykalsky Krai
- District: Priargunsky District
- Time zone: UTC+9:00

Duroy (Russian: Дурой) is a rural locality (a selo) in Priargunsky District, Zabaykalsky Krai, Russia. Population: 686 (2021 census); 781 (2010 census); 831 (2002 census); There are 5 streets in this selo.

== Geography ==
This rural locality is located 41 km from Priargunsk (the district's administrative centre), 449 km from Chita (capital of Zabaykalsky Krai) and 5,846 km from Moscow. Bogdanovka is the nearest rural locality.
