= Vereya, Zabaykalsky Krai =

Vereya Верея
- Settlement
- Location within Zabaykalsky Krai Location within Russia
- Coordinates: 50°35′N 119°07′E
- Country: Russia
- Region: Zabaykalsky Krai
- District: Priargunsky District
- Time zone: UTC+9:00

Vereya (Russian: Верея) is a rural locality (a settlement) in Priargunsky District, Zabaykalsky Krai, Russia. Population: 56 (2021 census); 76 (2010 census); 125 (2002 census); There are 5 streets in this settlement.

== Geography ==
This rural locality is located 25 km from Priargunsk (the district's administrative centre), 428 km from Chita (capital of Zabaykalsky Krai) and 5,782 km from Moscow. Norinsk is the nearest rural locality.
