= Pogranichny, Zabaykalsky Krai =

Pogranichny Пограничный
- Selo
- Location within Zabaykalsky Krai Location within Russia
- Coordinates: 50°35′N 118°57′E
- Country: Russia
- Region: Zabaykalsky Krai
- District: Priargunsky District
- Time zone: UTC+9:00

Pogranichny (Russian: Пограничный) is a rural locality (a selo) in Priargunsky District, Zabaykalsky Krai, Russia. Population: 470 (2021 census); 552 (2010 census); 774 (2002 census); There are 9 streets in this selo.

== Geography ==
This rural locality is located 27 km from Priargunsk (the district's administrative centre), 417 km from Chita (capital of Zabaykalsky Krai) and 5,771 km from Moscow. Talman-Borzya is the nearest rural locality.
