= Karaksar (air base) =

Karaksar
- Olovyannaya, Zabaykalsky Krai in Russia

Site information
- Type: Air Base
- Owner: Ministry of Defence
- Operator: Soviet Air Forces

Location
- Shown within Zabaykalsky Krai Karaksar (Russia)
- Coordinates: 51°17′0″N 115°51′0″E

Site history
- In use: 1991

Airfield information
- Identifiers: ICAO: XIAP
- Elevation: 625 metres (2,051 ft) AMSL
Runways
Direction	Length and surface
15/33	1,000 metres (3,281 ft) Concrete

Karaksar is a former air base in Russia located 42 km northeast of Olovyannaya. It is a former military airfield with taxiways and tarmac, probably for forward deployment in the event of a Sino-Soviet conflict, demolished at the end of the Cold War.
