= Klichka =

Klichka Кличка
- Urban-type settlement
- Interactive map of Klichka
- Location of Klichka Klichka (Zabaykalsky Krai)
- Coordinates: 50.4427°N 118.0002°E
- Country: Russia
- Federal subject: Zabaykalsky Krai
- Administrative district: Priargunsky District

Population (2010 Census)
  - Total: 1,786
  - Estimate (1 January 2018): 1,316 (−26.3%)
- Time zone: UTC+9 (MSK+6)
- Postal code: 674320
- OKTMO ID: 76638154051

Klichka (Russian: Кличка) is an urban locality (an urban-type settlement) in Priargunsky District of Zabaykalsky Krai, Russia. Population: 1,786 (2010 census); 2,628 (2002 census); 4,412 (1989 Soviet census).
