= Zolotorechensk =

Zolotorechensk Золотореченск
- Urban-type settlement
- Interactive map of Zolotorechensk
- Location of Zolotorechensk Zolotorechensk (Zabaykalsky Krai)
- Coordinates: 51.0558°N 116.7439°E
- Country: Russia
- Federal subject: Zabaykalsky Krai
- Administrative district: Olovyanninsky District
- Founded: 1986

Population (2010 Census)
  - Total: 1,442
  - Estimate (1 January 2018): 1,064 (−26.2%)
- Time zone: UTC+9 (MSK+6)
- Postal code: 674549
- OKTMO ID: 76632152051

Zolotorechensk (Russian: Золотореченск) is an urban locality (an urban-type settlement) in Olovyanninsky District of Zabaykalsky Krai, Russia. Population: 1,442 (2010 census); 2,033 (2002 census); 6,066 (1989 Soviet census).
