= Kalanguy =

Kalanguy Калангуй
- Urban-type settlement
- Interactive map of Kalanguy
- Location of Kalanguy Kalanguy (Zabaykalsky Krai)
- Coordinates: 51.0106°N 116.5215°E
- Country: Russia
- Federal subject: Zabaykalsky Krai
- Administrative district: Olovyanninsky District
- Founded: 1919

Population (2010 Census)
  - Total: 2,112
  - Estimate (1 January 2018): 1,618 (−23.4%)
- Time zone: UTC+9 (MSK+6)
- Postal code: 674553
- OKTMO ID: 76632153051

Kalanguy (Russian: Калангуй) is an urban locality (an urban-type settlement) in Olovyanninsky District of Zabaykalsky Krai, Russia. Population: 2,112 (2010 census); 2,800 (2002 census); 4,745 (1989 Soviet census).
