= Zapokrovsky =

Zapokrovsky Запокровский
- Selo
- Location within Zabaykalsky Krai Location within Russia
- Coordinates: 50°49′N 119°10′E
- Country: Russia
- Region: Zabaykalsky Krai
- District: Kalgansky District
- Time zone: UTC+9:00

Zapokrovsky (Russian: Запокровский) is a rural locality (a selo) in Kalgansky District, Zabaykalsky Krai, Russia. Population: 3 (2021 census); 10 (2010 census); There is 1 street in this selo.

== Geography ==
This rural locality is located 23 km from Kalga (the district's administrative centre), 421 km from Chita (capital of Zabaykalsky Krai) and 5,755 km from Moscow. Shiviya is the nearest rural locality.
