= Shelopugino, Zabaykalsky Krai =

Shelopugino Шелопугино
- Selo
- Interactive map of Shelopugino
- Location of Shelopugino Shelopugino (Zabaykalsky Krai)
- Coordinates: 51°39′N 117°33′E
- Country: Russia
- Federal subject: Zabaykalsky Krai
- Administrative district: Shelopuginsky District

Population (2010 Census)
  - Total: 3,274

Administrative status
  - Capital of: Shelopuginsky District
- Time zone: UTC+9 (MSK+6)
- Postal code: 673610
- OKTMO ID: 76652475101

Shelopugino (Russian: Шелопугино) is a rural locality (a selo) and the administrative center of Shelopuginsky District of Zabaykalsky Krai, Russia. Population: 3,274 (2010 census); 3,571 (2002 census); 4,199 (1989 Soviet census).

== Geography ==
The village is about 462 km southeast of the regional capital Chita and 72 km from the nearest railway station. It is on the bank of the Unda River. There is a Museum of Local History.

== History ==
Shelopugino was first mentioned in 1782. A prison camp operated until 1917. In January 1930 the agricultural commune was formed, which united 11 villages or 900 peasant households, but by May it had ceased, and the residents joined the peasant uprising. Until the 1990s, the airport operated.
