= Kadaya =

Kadaya Кадая
- Selo
- Location within Zabaykalsky Krai Location within Russia
- Coordinates: 50°56′N 119°17′E
- Country: Russia
- Region: Zabaykalsky Krai
- District: Kalgansky District
- Time zone: UTC+9:00

Kadaya (Russian: Кадая) is a rural locality (a selo) in Kalgansky District, Zabaykalsky Krai, Russia. Population: 830 (2021 census); 1,046 (2010 census); 1,220 (2002 census); There are 13 streets in this selo.

== Geography ==
This rural locality is located 28 km from Kalga (the district's administrative centre), 424 km from Chita (capital of Zabaykalsky Krai) and 5,749 km from Moscow. Bugutuy is the nearest rural locality.
