= Yasnogorsk, Zabaykalsky Krai =

Yasnogorsk Ясногорск
- Urban-type settlement
- Interactive map of Yasnogorsk
- Location of Yasnogorsk Yasnogorsk (Zabaykalsky Krai)
- Coordinates: 50.8769°N 115.6993°E
- Country: Russia
- Federal subject: Zabaykalsky Krai
- Administrative district: Olovyanninsky District

Population (2010 Census)
  - Total: 8,873
  - Estimate (1 January 2018): 6,839 (−22.9%)
- Time zone: UTC+9 (MSK+6)
- Postal code: 674520
- OKTMO ID: 76632170051

Yasnogorsk (Russian: Ясногорск) is an urban locality (an urban-type settlement) in Olovyanninsky District of Zabaykalsky Krai, Russia. Population: 8,873 (2010 census); 9,747 (2002 census); 7,546 (1989 Soviet census).
