= Pogranichnoye, Volgograd Oblast =

Pogranichnoye Пограничное
- Selo
- Location within Volgograd Oblast Location within Russia
- Coordinates: 51°03′N 45°06′E
- Country: Russia
- Region: Volgograd Oblast
- District: Zhirnovsky District
- Time zone: UTC+4:00

Pogranichnoye (Russian: Пограничное) is a rural locality (a selo) in Alyoshnikovskoye Rural Settlement, Zhirnovsky District, Volgograd Oblast, Russia. The population was 93 as of 2010.

== Geography ==
Pogranichnoye is located in forest steppe of Volga Upland, 59 km northeast of Zhirnovsk (the district's administrative centre) by road. Novinka is the nearest rural locality.
