= Pervomaysky, Zabaykalsky Krai =

Pervomaysky Первомайский
- Urban-type settlement
- Interactive map of Pervomaysky
- Location of Pervomaysky Pervomaysky (Zabaykalsky Krai)
- Coordinates: 51.6692°N 115.6390°E
- Country: Russia
- Federal subject: Zabaykalsky Krai
- Administrative district: Shilkinsky District
- Founded: 1937

Population (2010 Census)
  - Total: 12,154
  - Estimate (1 January 2018): 11,316 (−6.9%)
- Time zone: UTC+9 (MSK+6)
- Postal code: 673390
- OKTMO ID: 76654158051

Pervomaysky (Russian: Первомайский) is an urban locality (an urban-type settlement) in Shilkinsky District of Zabaykalsky Krai, Russia. Population: 12,154 (2010 census); 13,098 (2002 census); 16,299 (1989 Soviet census).
