= Itaka, Russia =

Itaka Итака
- Urban-type settlement
- Interactive map of Itaka
- Location of Itaka Itaka (Zabaykalsky Krai)
- Coordinates: 53.8881°N 118.7113°E
- Country: Russia
- Federal subject: Zabaykalsky Krai
- Administrative district: Mogochinsky District

Population (2010 Census)
  - Total: 356
  - Estimate (1 January 2018): 273 (−23.3%)
- Time zone: UTC+9 (MSK+6)
- Postal code: 673754
- OKTMO ID: 76626162056

Itaka (Russian: Итака) is an urban locality (an urban-type settlement) in Mogochinsky District of Zabaykalsky Krai, Russia. Population: 356 (2010 census); 451 (2002 census); 655 (1989 Soviet census).

== Geography ==
Itaka is located in the Olyokma-Stanovik, near the upper reaches of the Tungir
