= Darasun =

Darasun Дарасун
- Urban-type settlement
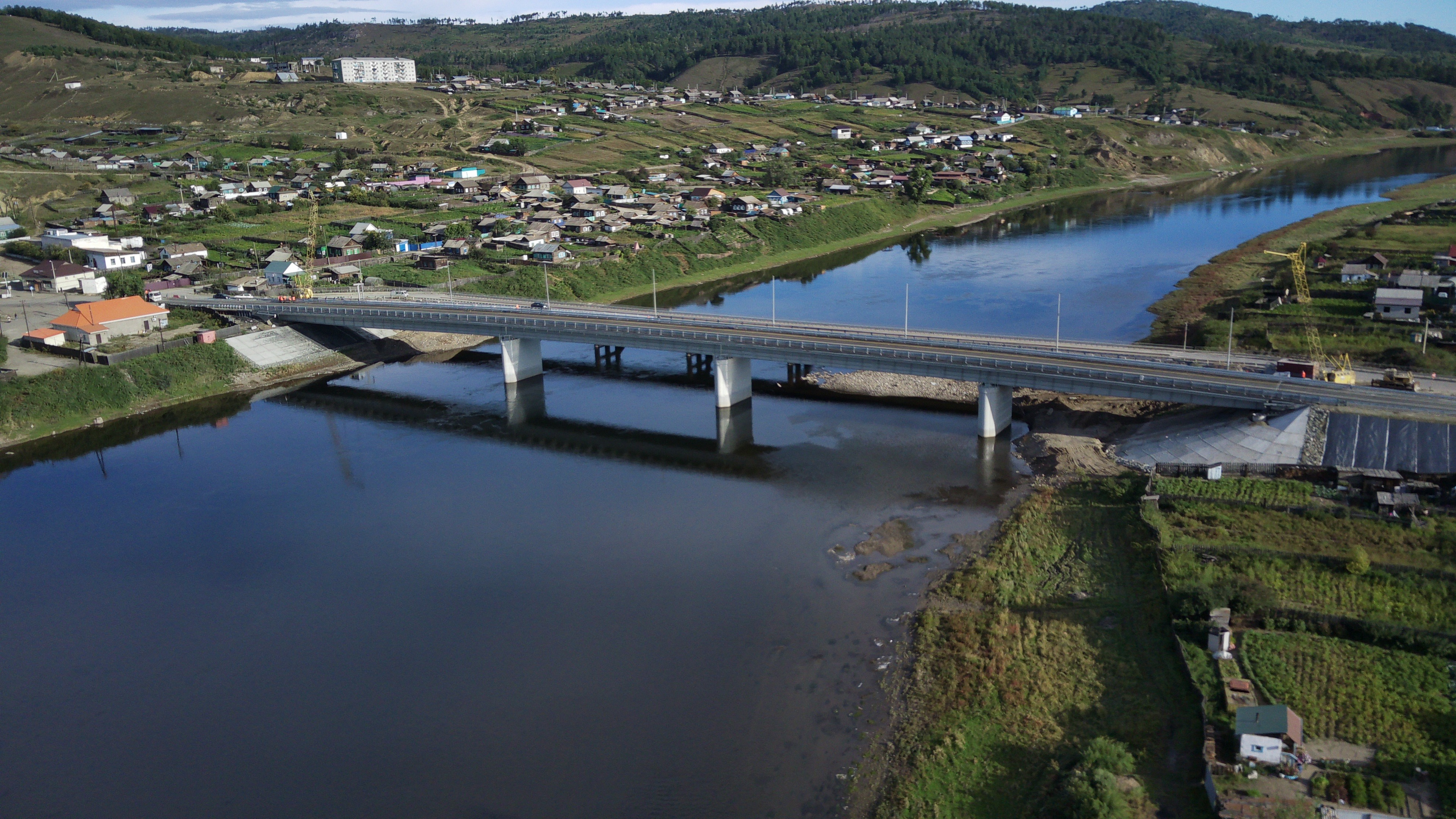
- Interactive map of Darasun
- Location of Darasun Darasun (Zabaykalsky Krai)
- Coordinates: 51.6638°N 113.9846°E
- Country: Russia
- Federal subject: Zabaykalsky Krai
- Administrative district: Karymsky District
- Elevation: 603 m (1,978 ft)

Population (2010 Census)
  - Total: 7,325
  - Estimate (1 January 2018): 6,821 (−6.9%)
- Time zone: UTC+9 (MSK+6)
- Postal codes: 673310, 673311
- OKTMO ID: 76620153051

Darasun (Russian: Дарасун) is an urban locality (an urban-type settlement) in Karymsky District of Zabaykalsky Krai, Russia. Population: 7,325 (2010 census); 8,106 (2002 census); 9,635 (1989 Soviet census).

After the unsuccessful Polish January Uprising in partitioned Poland, 40 Poles were exiled to Darasun as of 1871.
