= Atamanovka, Zabaykalsky Krai =

Atamanovka Атамановка
- Urban-type settlement
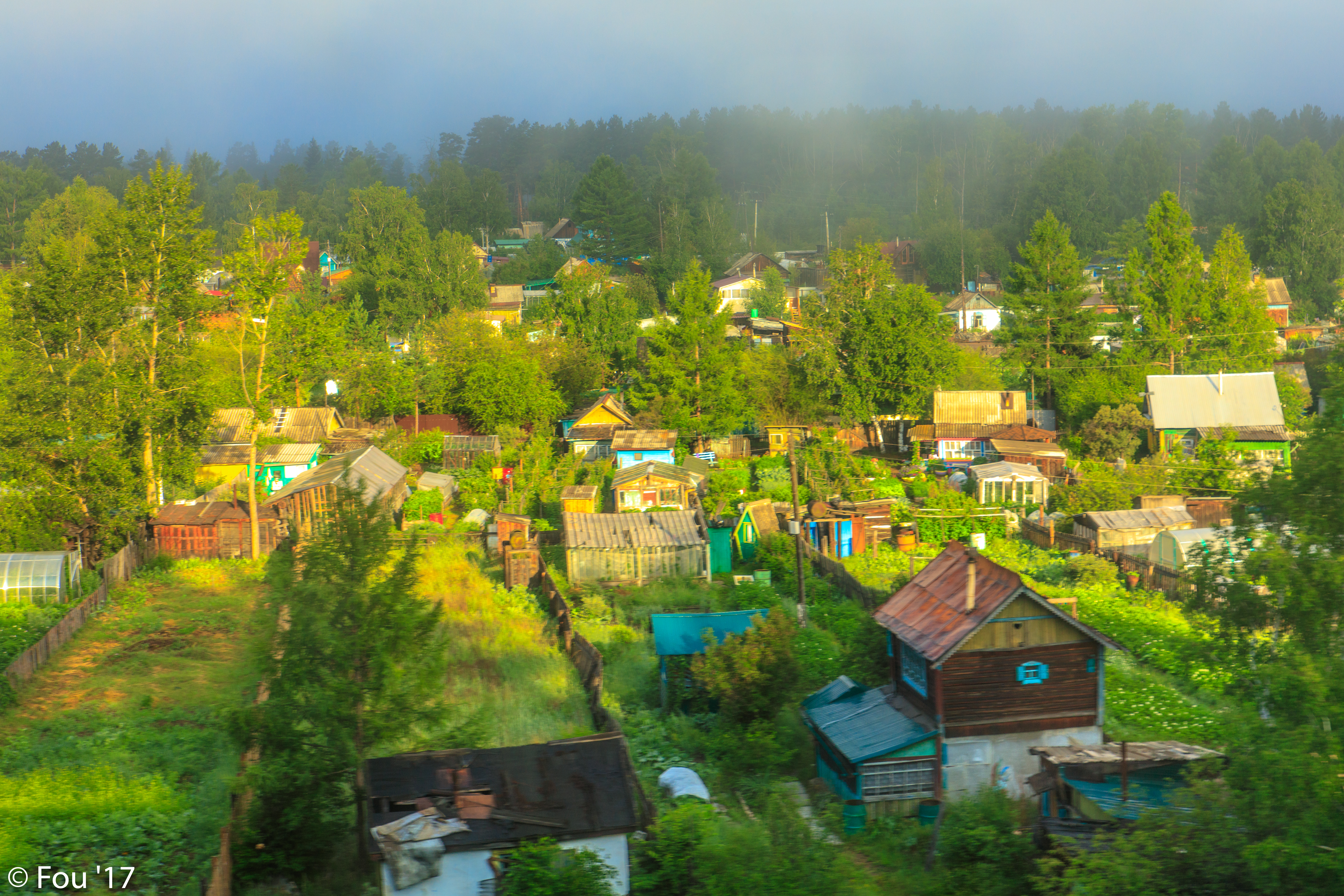
- Interactive map of Atamanovka
- Location of Atamanovka Atamanovka (Zabaykalsky Krai)
- Coordinates: 51°56′N 113°38′E
- Country: Russia
- Federal subject: Zabaykalsky Krai
- Administrative district: Chitinsky District
- Founded: 1852
- Elevation: 652 m (2,139 ft)

Population (2010 Census)
  - Total: 10,381
  - Estimate (1 January 2018): 10,209 (−1.7%)
- Time zone: UTC+9 (MSK+6)
- Postal code: 672530
- OKTMO ID: 76650154051

Atamanovka (Russian: Атама́новка) is an urban locality (an urban-type settlement) and a railway station in the central part of Chitinsky District of Zabaykalsky Krai, Russia, located on the left bank of the Ingoda River, 18 kilometers (11 mi) southeast of Chita. Population: 10,381 (2010 census); 9,463 (2002 census); 10,269 (1989 Soviet census); 190 (1917).

== History ==
Atamanovvka was founded in 1852 and initially named Atamanka (Атама́нка). Until the 1930s, Atamanovka's inhabitants lived on raising their livestock. Urban-type settlement status was granted in 1958.

== Economy ==
A large broadcasting facility (Kruchina transmitter) for LW, MW, and SW is situated at Atamanovka.

== Culture ==
There is a memorial honoring the explorers of space in Atamanovka.
