= Klyuchevsky, Zabaykalsky Krai =

Klyuchevsky Ключевский
- Urban-type settlement
- Interactive map of Klyuchevsky
- Location of Klyuchevsky Klyuchevsky (Zabaykalsky Krai)
- Coordinates: 53.5338°N 119.4528°E
- Country: Russia
- Federal subject: Zabaykalsky Krai
- Administrative district: Mogochinsky District

Population (2010 Census)
  - Total: 1,356
  - Estimate (1 January 2018): 1,234 (−9%)
- Time zone: UTC+9 (MSK+6)
- Postal code: 673741
- OKTMO ID: 76626160051

Klyuchevsky (Russian: Ключевский) is an urban locality (an urban-type settlement) in Mogochinsky District of Zabaykalsky Krai, Russia. Population: 1,356 (2010 census); 1,694 (2002 census); 2,839 (1989 Soviet census).
