= Priiskovy, Zabaykalsky Krai =

Priiskovy Приисковый
- Urban-type settlement
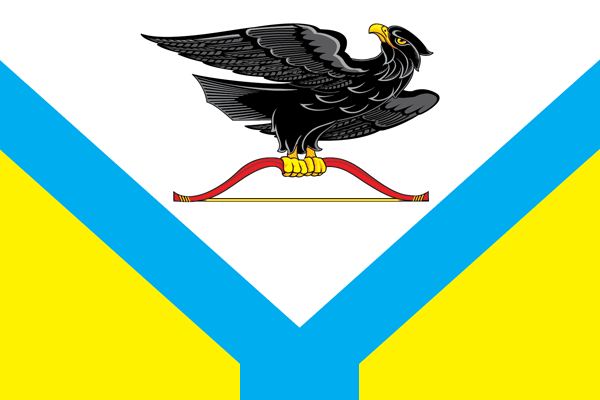
- Flag
- Interactive map of Priiskovy
- Location of Priiskovy Priiskovy (Zabaykalsky Krai)
- Coordinates: 51.9175°N 116.6176°E
- Country: Russia
- Federal subject: Zabaykalsky Krai
- Administrative district: Nerchinsky District

Population (2010 Census)
  - Total: 1,520
  - Estimate (1 January 2018): 1,376 (−9.5%)
- Time zone: UTC+9 (MSK+6)
- Postal code: 673410
- OKTMO ID: 76628153051

Priiskovy (Russian: Приисковый) is an urban locality (an urban-type settlement) in Nerchinsky District of Zabaykalsky Krai, Russia. Population: 1,520 (2010 census); 1,649 (2002 census); 2,067 (1989 Soviet census).
