= Davenda =

Davenda Давенда
- Urban-type settlement
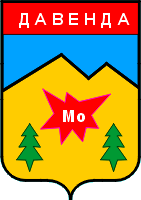
- Coat of arms
- Interactive map of Davenda
- Location of Davenda Davenda (Zabaykalsky Krai)
- Coordinates: 53.5555°N 119.3160°E
- Country: Russia
- Federal subject: Zabaykalsky Krai
- Administrative district: Mogochinsky District
- Founded: 1939

Population (2010 Census)
  - Total: 812
  - Estimate (1 January 2018): 727 (−10.5%)
- Time zone: UTC+9 (MSK+6)
- Postal code: 673742
- OKTMO ID: 76626156051

Davenda (Russian: Давенда) is an urban locality (an urban-type settlement) in Mogochinsky District of Zabaykalsky Krai, Russia. Population: 812 (2010 census); 1,022 (2002 census); 2,020 (1989 Soviet census).
