= Kurort Darasun =

Kurort Darasun Курорт-Дарасун
- Urban-type settlement
- Interactive map of Kurort Darasun
- Location of Kurort Darasun Kurort Darasun (Zabaykalsky Krai)
- Coordinates: 51.2038°N 113.7118°E
- Country: Russia
- Federal subject: Zabaykalsky Krai
- Administrative district: Karymsky District
- Founded: 1858

Population (2010 Census)
  - Total: 3,120
  - Estimate (1 January 2018): 2,835 (−9.1%)
- Time zone: UTC+9 (MSK+6)
- Postal code: 673314
- OKTMO ID: 76620157051

Kurort Darasun (Russian: Курорт-Дарасун) is an urban locality (an urban-type settlement) in Karymsky District of Zabaykalsky Krai, Russia. Population: 3,120 (2010 census); 3,423 (2002 census); 5,158 (1989 Soviet census).
