= Amazar =

Amazar Амазар
- Work settlement
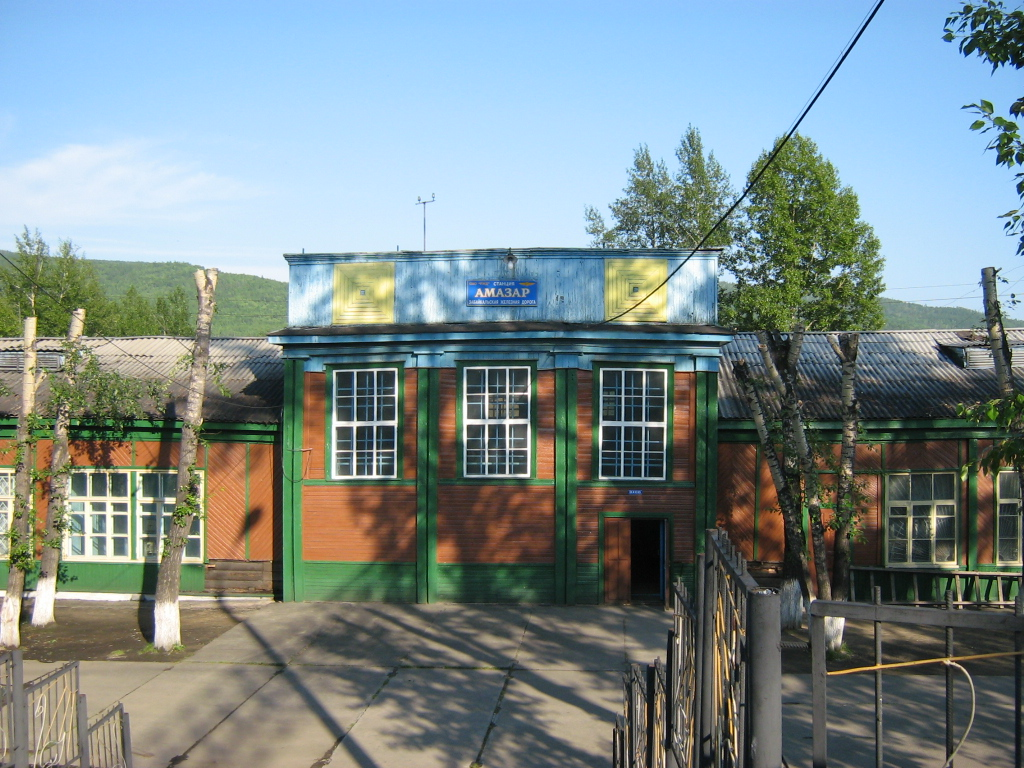
- Interactive map of Amazar
- Location of Amazar Amazar (Zabaykalsky Krai)
- Coordinates: 53°51′38″N 120°52′36″E
- Country: Russia
- Federal subject: Zabaykalsky Krai
- Administrative district: Mogochinsky District
- Elevation: 468 m (1,535 ft)

Population (2010 Census)
  - Total: 2,374
  - Estimate (1 January 2018): 2,315 (−2.5%)

Municipal status
  - Municipal district: Mogochinsky Municipal District
  - Urban settlement: Amazarskoye Urban Settlement
  - Capital of: Amazarskoye Urban Settlement
- Time zone: UTC+9 (MSK+6)
- Postal code: 673775
- OKTMO ID: 76626154051

Amazar (Russian: Амазар) is an urban locality (urban-type settlement) in Mogochinsky District of Zabaykalsky Krai, Russia. Population: 2,374 (2010 census); 2,641 (2002 census); 3,521 (1989 Soviet census).

== Geography ==
The settlement is located by the left bank of the Amazar river at its confluence with the Chichatka, 98 km (61 mi) ENE of Mogocha.
