= Orlovsky, Zabaykalsky Krai =

Orlovsky Орловский
- Urban-type settlement
- Interactive map of Orlovsky
- Location of Orlovsky Orlovsky (Zabaykalsky Krai)
- Coordinates: 51.0385°N 114.8535°E
- Country: Russia
- Federal subject: Zabaykalsky Krai
- Administrative district: Aginsky District
- Founded: 1940

Population (2010 Census)
  - Total: 2,194
  - Estimate (1 January 2018): 1,971 (−10.2%)
- Time zone: UTC+9 (MSK+6)
- Postal code: 687510
- OKTMO ID: 76602154051

Orlovsky (Russian: Орловский) is an urban locality (an urban-type settlement) in Aginsky District of Zabaykalsky Krai, Russia. Population: 2,194 (2010 census); 2,348 (2002 census); 3,366 (1989 Soviet census).
