= Balyaga =

Balyaga Баляга
- Urban-type settlement
- Interactive map of Balyaga
- Location of Balyaga Balyaga (Zabaykalsky Krai)
- Coordinates: 51.1451°N 108.9313°E
- Country: Russia
- Federal subject: Zabaykalsky Krai
- Administrative district: Petrovsk-Zabaykalsky District
- Founded: 1899
- Elevation: 738 m (2,421 ft)

Population (2010 Census)
  - Total: 3,322
  - Estimate (1 January 2018): 2,867 (−13.7%)
- Time zone: UTC+9 (MSK+6)
- Postal codes: 673012, 673021
- OKTMO ID: 76636152051

Balyaga (Russian: Баляга) is an urban locality (an urban-type settlement) in Petrovsk-Zabaykalsky District of Zabaykalsky Krai, Russia. Population: 3,322 (2010 census); 3,720 (2002 census); 5,068 (1989 Soviet census).
