= Kholbon =

Kholbon Холбон
- Urban-type settlement
- Interactive map of Kholbon
- Location of Kholbon Kholbon (Zabaykalsky Krai)
- Coordinates: 51.9003°N 116.2521°E
- Country: Russia
- Federal subject: Zabaykalsky Krai
- Administrative district: Shilkinsky District

Population (2010 Census)
  - Total: 2,611
  - Estimate (1 January 2018): 2,372 (−9.2%)
- Time zone: UTC+9 (MSK+6)
- Postal code: 673376
- OKTMO ID: 76654164051

Kholbon (Russian: Холбон) is an urban locality (an urban-type settlement) in Shilkinsky District of Zabaykalsky Krai, Russia. Population: 2,611 (2010 census); 2,652 (2002 census); 3,377 (1989 Soviet census).
