= Vershino-Darasunsky =

Vershino-Darasunsky Вершино-Дарасунский
- Urban-type settlement
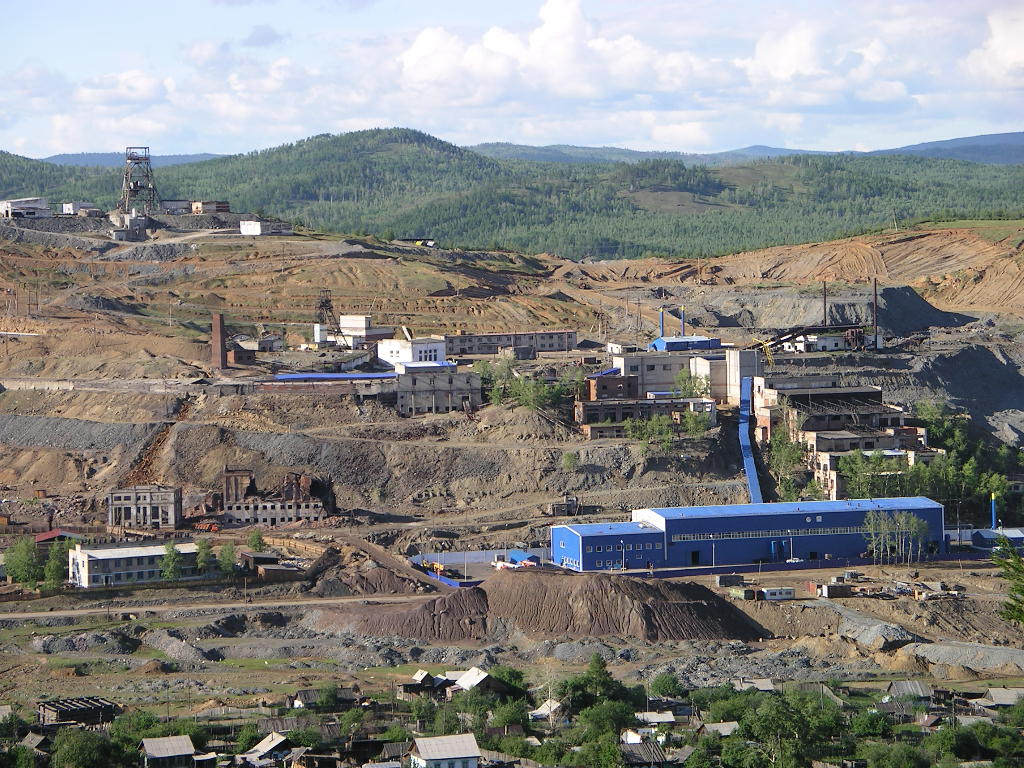

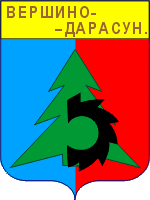
- Coat of arms
- Interactive map of Vershino-Darasunsky
- Location of Vershino-Darasunsky Vershino-Darasunsky (Zabaykalsky Krai)
- Coordinates: 52.3661°N 115.5528°E
- Country: Russia
- Federal subject: Zabaykalsky Krai
- Administrative district: Tungokochensky District
- Founded: 1865

Population (2010 Census)
  - Total: 5,946
  - Estimate (1 January 2018): 5,398 (−9.2%)
- Time zone: UTC+9 (MSK+6)
- Postal code: 674125
- OKTMO ID: 76644154051

Vershino-Darasunsky (Russian: Вершино-Дарасунский) is an urban locality (an urban-type settlement) in Tungokochensky District of Zabaykalsky Krai, Russia. Population: 5,946 (2010 census); 6,743 (2002 census); 10,384 (1989 Soviet census).
