= Bukachacha =

Bukachacha Букачача
- Work settlement
- Interactive map of Bukachacha
- Location of Bukachacha Bukachacha (Zabaykalsky Krai)
- Coordinates: 52°58′59.99″N 116°55′0.01″E
- Country: Russia
- Federal subject: Zabaykalsky Krai
- Administrative district: Chernyshevsky District
- Founded: 1911
- Urban-type settlement status since: 1938
- Elevation: 675 m (2,215 ft)

Population (2010 Census)
  - Total: 2,359
  - Estimate (1 January 2018): 1,854 (−21.4%)

Municipal status
  - Municipal district: Chernyshevsky Municipal District
  - Urban settlement: Bukachacha Urban Settlement
  - Capital of: Bukachacha Urban Settlement
- Time zone: UTC+9 (MSK+6)
- Postal code: 673492
- OKTMO ID: 76648156051

Bukachacha (Russian: Букачача) is an urban locality (urban-type settlement) in Chernyshevsky District of Zabaykalsky Krai, Russia. Population: 2,359 (2010 census); 3,525 (2002 census); 7,941 (1989 Soviet census).

During 1938-1942 there were the headquarters of the Bukachachlag GULAG labor camp. At that time it was part of Chita Oblast.
