= Novopavlovka, Zabaykalsky Krai =

Novopavlovka Новопавловка
- Work settlement
- Interactive map of Novopavlovka
- Location of Novopavlovka Novopavlovka (Zabaykalsky Krai)
- Coordinates: 51°13′N 109°14′E
- Country: Russia
- Federal subject: Zabaykalsky Krai
- Administrative district: Petrovsk-Zabaykalsky District
- Founded: 1868
- Urban-type settlement status since: 1938

Population (2010 Census)
  - Total: 3,941
  - Estimate (1 January 2018): 3,618 (−8.2%)

Municipal status
  - Municipal district: Petrovsk-Zabaykalsky Municipal District
  - Urban settlement: Novopavlovka Urban Settlement
  - Capital of: Novopavlovka Urban Settlement
- Time zone: UTC+9 (MSK+6)
- Postal code: 673030
- OKTMO ID: 76636156051

Novopavlovka (Russian: Новопавловка) is an urban locality (urban-type settlement) in Petrovsk-Zabaykalsky District of Zabaykalsky Krai, Russia. Population: 3,941 (2010 census); 4,288 (2002 census); 4,775 (1989 Soviet census).
