= Arbagar =

Arbagar Арбагар
- Work settlement
- Interactive map of Arbagar
- Location of Arbagar Arbagar (Zabaykalsky Krai)
- Coordinates: 51°56′27″N 116°16′54″E
- Country: Russia
- Federal subject: Zabaykalsky Krai
- Administrative district: Shilkinsky District
- Founded: 1887
- Elevation: 535 m (1,755 ft)

Population (2010 Census)
  - Total: 554
  - Estimate (1 January 2018): 452 (−18.4%)

Municipal status
  - Municipal district: Shilkinsky Municipal District
  - Urban settlement: Kholbonskoye Urban Settlement
- Time zone: UTC+9 (MSK+6)
- Postal code: 673377
- OKTMO ID: 76654164106

Arbagar (Russian: Арбагар) is an urban locality (urban-type settlement) in Shilkinsky District of Zabaykalsky Krai, Russia. Population: 554 (2010 census); 744 (2002 census); 1,447 (1989 Soviet census).
