= Novoorlovsk =

Novoorlovsk Новоорловск
- Urban-type settlement
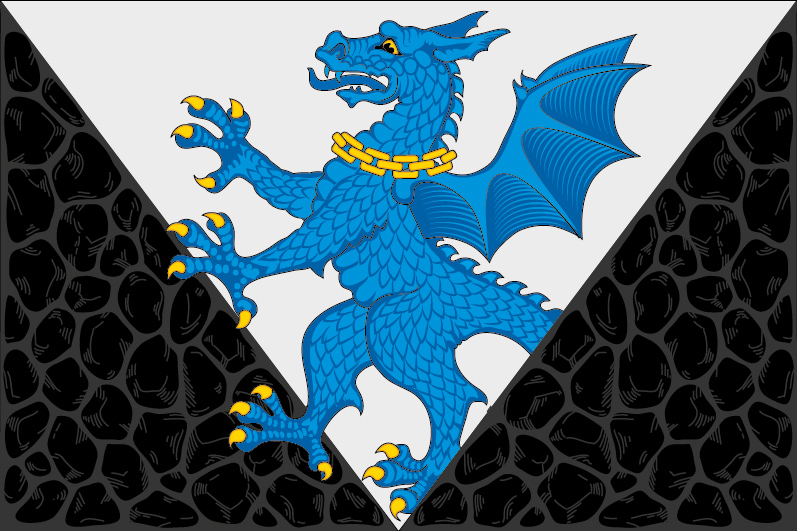
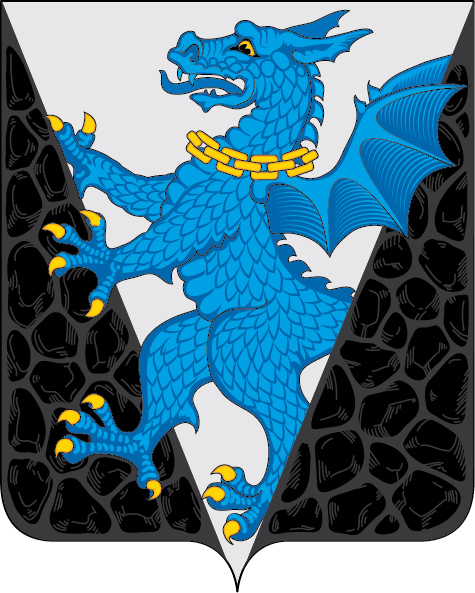
- Flag Coat of arms
- Interactive map of Novoorlovsk
- Location of Novoorlovsk Novoorlovsk (Zabaykalsky Krai)
- Coordinates: 51.0647°N 114.7284°E
- Country: Russia
- Federal subject: Zabaykalsky Krai
- Administrative district: Aginsky District

Population (2010 Census)
  - Total: 3,110
  - Estimate (1 January 2018): 2,848 (−8.4%)
- Time zone: UTC+9 (MSK+6)
- Postal code: 687520
- OKTMO ID: 76602153051

Novoorlovsk (Russian: Новоорловск) is an urban locality (an urban-type settlement) in Aginsky District of Zabaykalsky Krai, Russia. Population: 3,110 (2010 census); 2,859 (2002 census); 5,298 (1989 Soviet census).
