= Zhireken =

Zhireken Жирекен
- Work settlement
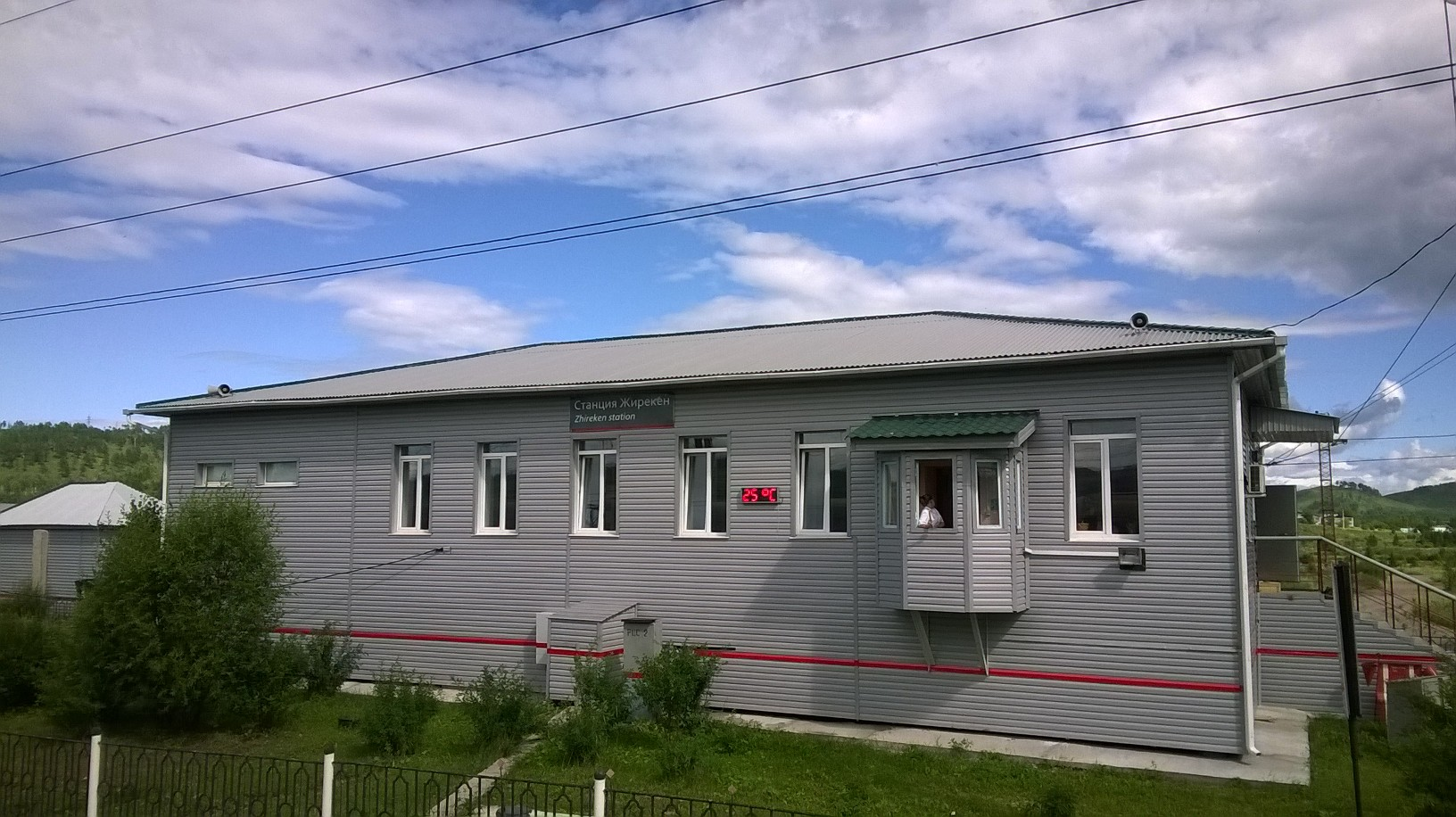
- Interactive map of Zhireken
- Location of Zhireken Zhireken (Zabaykalsky Krai)
- Coordinates: 52°48′0″N 117°19′59.99″E
- Country: Russia
- Federal subject: Zabaykalsky Krai
- Administrative district: Chernyshevsky District
- Founded: 1954
- Urban-type settlement status since: 1972

Population (2010 Census)
  - Total: 4,565
  - Estimate (1 January 2018): 4,440 (−2.7%)

Municipal status
  - Municipal district: Chernyshevsky Municipal District
  - Urban settlement: Zhireken Urban Settlement
  - Capital of: Zhireken Urban Settlement
- Time zone: UTC+9 (MSK+6)
- Postal code: 673498
- OKTMO ID: 76648158051

Zhireken (Russian: Жирекен) is an urban locality (urban-type settlement) in Chernyshevsky District of Zabaykalsky Krai, Russia. Population: 4,565 (2010 census); 3,937 (2002 census); 5,493 (1989 Soviet census).
