= Ksenyevka =

Ksenyevka Ксеньевка
- Urban-type settlement
- Interactive map of Ksenyevka
- Location of Ksenyevka Ksenyevka (Zabaykalsky Krai)
- Coordinates: 53.5600°N 118.7354°E
- Country: Russia
- Federal subject: Zabaykalsky Krai
- Administrative district: Mogochinsky District

Population (2010 Census)
  - Total: 2,980
  - Estimate (1 January 2018): 2,666 (−10.5%)
- Time zone: UTC+9 (MSK+6)
- Postal code: 673750
- OKTMO ID: 76626162051

Ksenyevka (Russian: Ксеньевка) is an urban locality (an urban-type settlement) in Mogochinsky District of Zabaykalsky Krai, Russia. Population: 2,980 (2010 census); 3,496 (2002 census); 5,104 (1989 Soviet census).
