= Novokruchininsky =

Novokruchininsky Новокручининский
- Urban-type settlement
- Interactive map of Novokruchininsky
- Location of Novokruchininsky Novokruchininsky (Zabaykalsky Krai)
- Coordinates: 51.7747°N 113.7934°E
- Country: Russia
- Federal subject: Zabaykalsky Krai
- Administrative district: Chitinsky District

Population (2010 Census)
  - Total: 10,166
  - Estimate (1 January 2018): 10,131 (−0.3%)
- Time zone: UTC+9 (MSK+6)
- Postal code: 672570
- OKTMO ID: 76650158051

Novokruchininsky (Russian: Новокручининский) is an urban locality (an urban-type settlement) in Chitinsky District of Zabaykalsky Krai, Russia. Population: 10,166 (2010 census); 9,817 (2002 census); 11,070 (1989 Soviet census).
