= Tarbagatay, Zabaykalsky Krai =

Tarbagatay Тарбагатай
- Urban-type settlement
- Interactive map of Tarbagatay
- Location of Tarbagatay Tarbagatay (Zabaykalsky Krai)
- Coordinates: 51.1782°N 109.0996°E
- Country: Russia
- Federal subject: Zabaykalsky Krai
- Administrative district: Petrovsk-Zabaykalsky District
- Founded: 1907

Population (2010 Census)
  - Total: 2,227
  - Estimate (1 January 2018): 2,051 (−7.9%)
- Time zone: UTC+9 (MSK+6)
- Postal code: 673040
- OKTMO ID: 76636158051

Tarbagatay (Russian: Тарбагатай) is an urban-type settlement in Petrovsk-Zabaykalsky District of Zabaykalsky Krai, Russia. Population: 2,227 (2010 census); 2,521 (2002 census); 3,343 (1989 Soviet census).
