= Sherlovaya Gora =

Sherlovaya Gora Шерловая Гора
- Work settlement
- Interactive map of Sherlovaya Gora
- Location of Sherlovaya Gora Sherlovaya Gora (Zabaykalsky Krai)
- Coordinates: 50°32′14″N 116°20′26″E
- Country: Russia
- Federal subject: Zabaykalsky Krai
- Administrative district: Borzinsky District
- Urban-type settlement status since: 1937

Population (2010 Census)
  - Total: 12,489
  - Estimate (1 January 2018): 12,078 (−3.3%)

Municipal status
  - Municipal district: Borzinsky Municipal District
  - Urban settlement: Sherlovaya Gora Urban Settlement
  - Capital of: Sherlovaya Gora Urban Settlement
- Time zone: UTC+9 (MSK+6)
- Postal code: 674607
- OKTMO ID: 76609154051

Sherlovaya Gora (Russian: Шерловая Гора) is an urban locality (urban-type settlement) in Borzinsky District of Zabaykalsky Krai, Russia. Population: 12,489 (2010 census); 14,623 (2002 census); 17,509 (1989 Soviet census).
