= Aksyonovo-Zilovskoye =

Aksyonovo-Zilovskoye Аксёново-Зиловское
- Work settlement
- Interactive map of Aksyonovo-Zilovskoye
- Location of Aksyonovo-Zilovskoye Aksyonovo-Zilovskoye (Zabaykalsky Krai)
- Coordinates: 53°03′57″N 117°30′38″E
- Country: Russia
- Federal subject: Zabaykalsky Krai
- Administrative district: Chernyshevsky District
- Founded: 1908

Population (2010 Census)
  - Total: 3,443
  - Estimate (1 January 2018): 2,978 (−13.5%)

Municipal status
  - Municipal district: Chernyshevsky Municipal District
  - Urban settlement: Aksyonovo-Zilovskoye Urban Settlement
  - Capital of: Aksyonovo-Zilovskoye Urban Settlement
- Time zone: UTC+9 (MSK+6)
- Postal code: 673497
- OKTMO ID: 76648154051

Aksyonovo-Zilovskoye (Russian: Аксёново-Зиловское) is an urban locality (urban-type settlement) in Chernyshevsky District of Zabaykalsky Krai, Russia. Population: 3,443 (2010 census); 4,283 (2002 census); 5,904 (1989 Soviet census).
