= Kokuy =

Kokuy Кокуй
- Urban-type settlement
- Interactive map of Kokuy
- Location of Kokuy Kokuy (Zabaykalsky Krai)
- Coordinates: 52.2041°N 117.5518°E
- Country: Russia
- Federal subject: Zabaykalsky Krai
- Administrative district: Sretensky District

Population (2010 Census)
  - Total: 7,179
  - Estimate (1 January 2018): 6,946 (−3.2%)
- Time zone: UTC+9 (MSK+6)
- Postal code: 673530
- OKTMO ID: 76640154051

Kokuy (Russian: Кокуй) is an urban locality (an urban-type settlement) in Sretensky District of Zabaykalsky Krai, Russia. Population: 7,179 (2010 census); 8,119 (2002 census); 9,492 (1989 Soviet census).
