= Yablonovo, Zabaykalsky Krai =

Yablonovo Яблоново
- Urban-type settlement
- Interactive map of Yablonovo
- Location of Yablonovo Yablonovo (Zabaykalsky Krai)
- Coordinates: 51.8399°N 112.7634°E
- Country: Russia
- Federal subject: Zabaykalsky Krai
- Administrative district: Chitinsky District

Population (2010 Census)
  - Total: 752
  - Estimate (1 January 2018): 680 (−9.6%)
- Time zone: UTC+9 (MSK+6)
- Postal code: 672560
- OKTMO ID: 76650164051

Yablonovo (Russian: Яблоново) is an urban locality (an urban-type settlement) in Chitinsky District of Zabaykalsky Krai, Russia. Population: 752 (2010 census); 835 (2002 census); 984 (1989 Soviet census).
