= Kalga =

Kalga Калга
- Selo
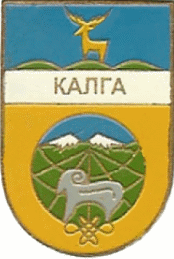
- Coat of arms
- Interactive map of Kalga
- Location of Kalga Kalga (Zabaykalsky Krai)
- Coordinates: 50°55′N 118°54′E
- Country: Russia
- Federal subject: Zabaykalsky Krai
- Administrative district: Kalgansky District
- Founded: 1777

Population (2010 Census)
  - Total: 3,425
  - Estimate (2021): 2,891 (−15.6%)

Administrative status
  - Capital of: Kalgansky District
- Time zone: UTC+9 (MSK+6)
- Postal code: 674340
- OKTMO ID: 76618433101

Kalga (Russian: Калга) is a rural locality (a selo) and the administrative center of Kalgansky District of Zabaykalsky Krai, Russia.

== Geography ==
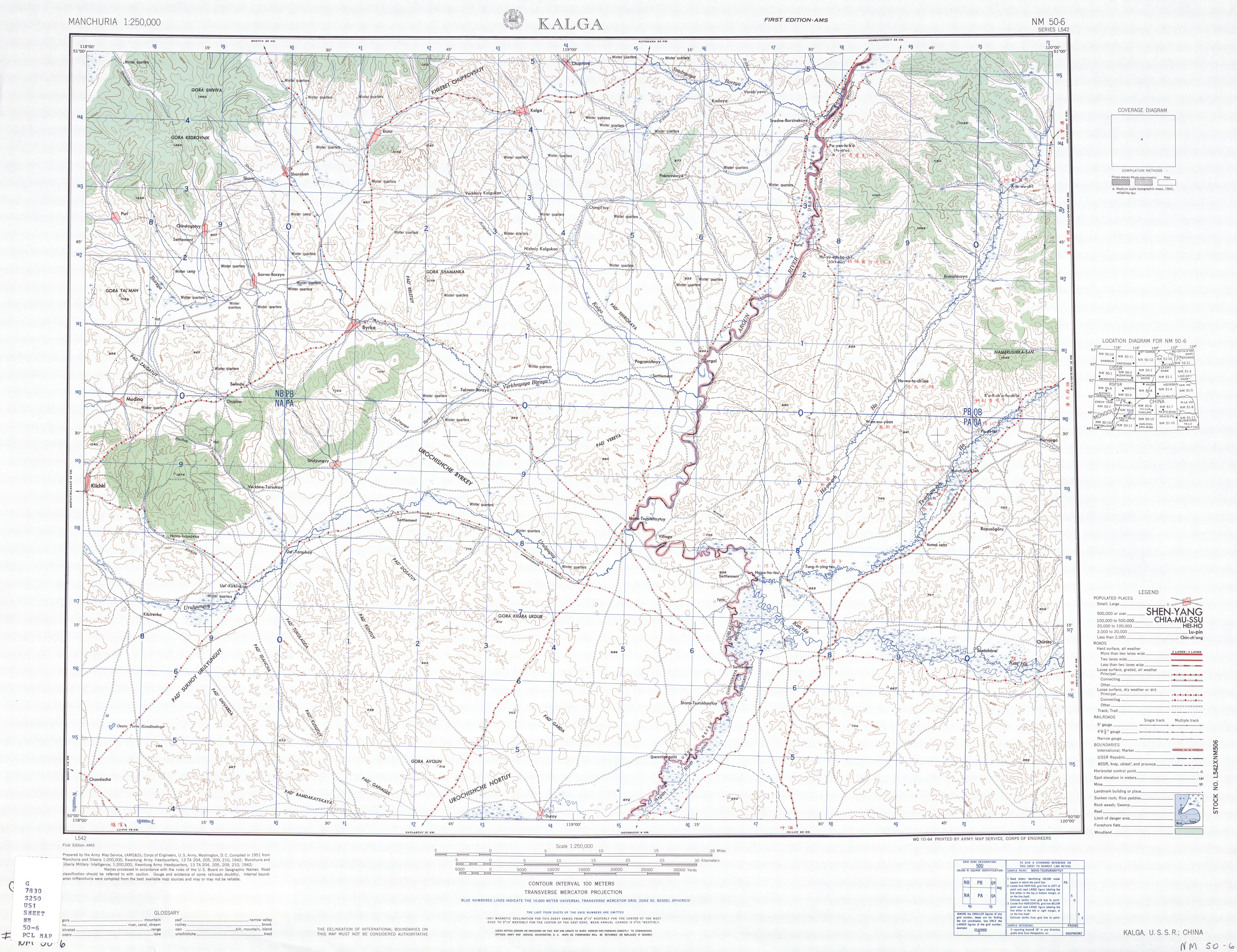
Kalga (1951)

It lies of the shore of the River Kalga (RUSSIA). It is located 581 km from Chita. In the village there is a district hospital, a pharmacy, a boarding school, an evening school, a creamery, a state bank, and a bookstore.

== History ==
Kalga was founded in 1777 by exiled members of the Pugachev uprising. Cossacks were settled here beginning in 1851. In September 1908 the 1st Transbaikal battery was deployed in the village. In the 1920s, most of the peasant households united in collective farms, but by the summer of 1930 the farms had disintegrated and kolkhas were formed. In 1942, it became the administrative center of the district. An asphalt plant was formed in 1987.

== Demographics ==
Population: 3,425 (2010 census); 3,735 (2002 census); 4,412 (1989 Soviet census).
