= Kalgansky District =

Kalgansky District Калганский район (Russian)
- District
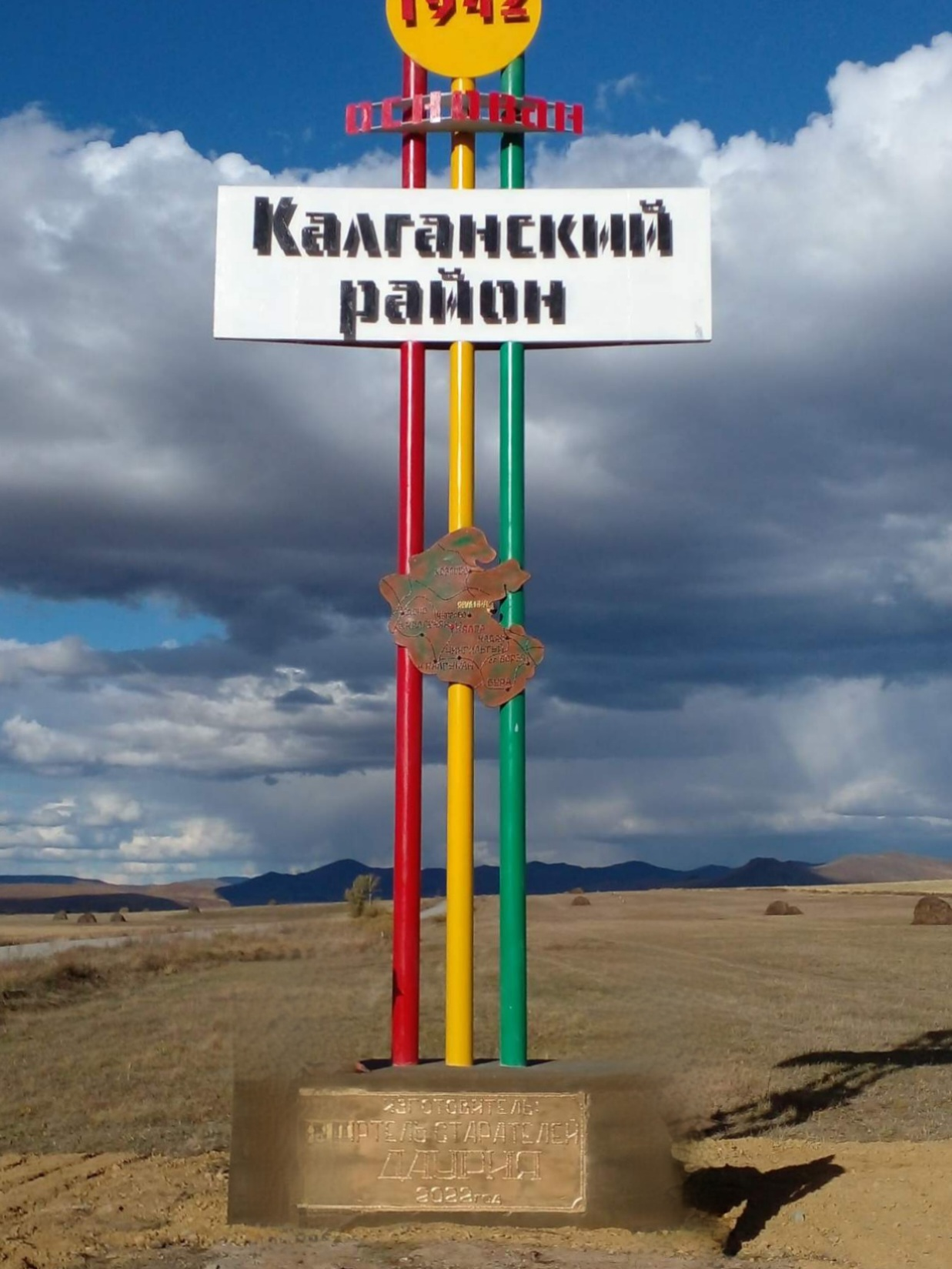
- Entrance to Kalgansky District
- Location of Kalgansky District in Zabaykalsky Krai
- Coordinates: 50°58′N 118°54′E
- Country: Russia
- Federal subject: Zabaykalsky Krai
- Established: December 8, 1942
- Administrative center: Kalga

Area
  - Total: 2,900 km^{2} (1,100 sq mi)

Population (2010 Census)
  - Total: 8,771
  - Estimate (2018): 7,612 (−13.2%)
  - Density: 3.0/km^{2} (7.8/sq mi)
  - Urban: 0%
  - Rural: 100%

Administrative structure
  - Inhabited localities: 12 rural localities

Municipal structure
  - Municipally incorporated as: Kalgansky Municipal District
  - Municipal divisions: 0 urban settlements, 11 rural settlements
- Time zone: UTC+9 (MSK+6)
- OKTMO ID: 76618000
- Website: http://калга.забайкальскийкрай.рф

Population of Kalgansky District
- 2010 Census: 8,771
- 2002 Census: 10,303
- 1989 Census: 13,240
- 1979 Census: 13,278

Kalgansky District (Russian: Калганский район) is an administrative and municipal district (raion), one of the thirty-one in Zabaykalsky Krai, Russia. It is located in the southeast of the krai and borders Nerchinsko-Zavodsky District in the north, Priargunsky District in the south, and Alexandrovo-Zavodsky District in the west. The area of the district is 2,900 square kilometers (1,100 sq mi). Its administrative center is the rural locality (a selo) of Kalga. As of the 2010 Census, the total population of the district was 8,771, with the population of Kalga accounting for 39.1% of that number.

== History ==
The district was established on December 8, 1942.
