= Olovyannaya =

Olovyannaya Оловя́нная
- Urban-type settlement
- Interactive map of Olovyannaya
- Location of Olovyannaya Olovyannaya (Zabaykalsky Krai)
- Coordinates: 50°56′N 115°34′E
- Country: Russia
- Federal subject: Zabaykalsky Krai
- Administrative district: Olovyanninsky District
- Founded: 1895

Population (2010 Census)
  - Total: 8,406
  - Estimate (1 January 2018): 7,355 (−12.5%)

Administrative status
  - Capital of: Olovyanninsky District

Municipal status
  - Urban okrug: Olovyannaya Okrug
  - Capital of: Olovyannaya Okrug
- Time zone: UTC+9 (MSK+6)
- Postal code: 674500
- OKTMO ID: 76632151051

Olovyannaya (Russian: Оловя́нная) is an urban locality (an urban-type settlement) and the administrative center of Olovyanninsky District in Zabaykalsky Krai, Russia. As of the 2010 census, the population was 8,406, down from 11,859 in 1989.

The town is located 249 km by rail from Chita. There is a museum of local history and a hospital.

== History ==
Olovyannaya was founded in 1895 with the construction of a railroad station. After the station was constructed, lime kilns, a sawmill, and a jetty for receiving barges were also constructed. A bridge over the Onon River was exploded during the Russian Civil War. The town became the administrative center of the district in 1926, and in 1929 the town was given the status of an urban settlement.

== Notable people ==
- Aleksandr Yakovlevich Mikhailov (born 1944), actor
