= Olovyanninsky District =

Olovyanninsky District Оловяннинский район (Russian)
- District
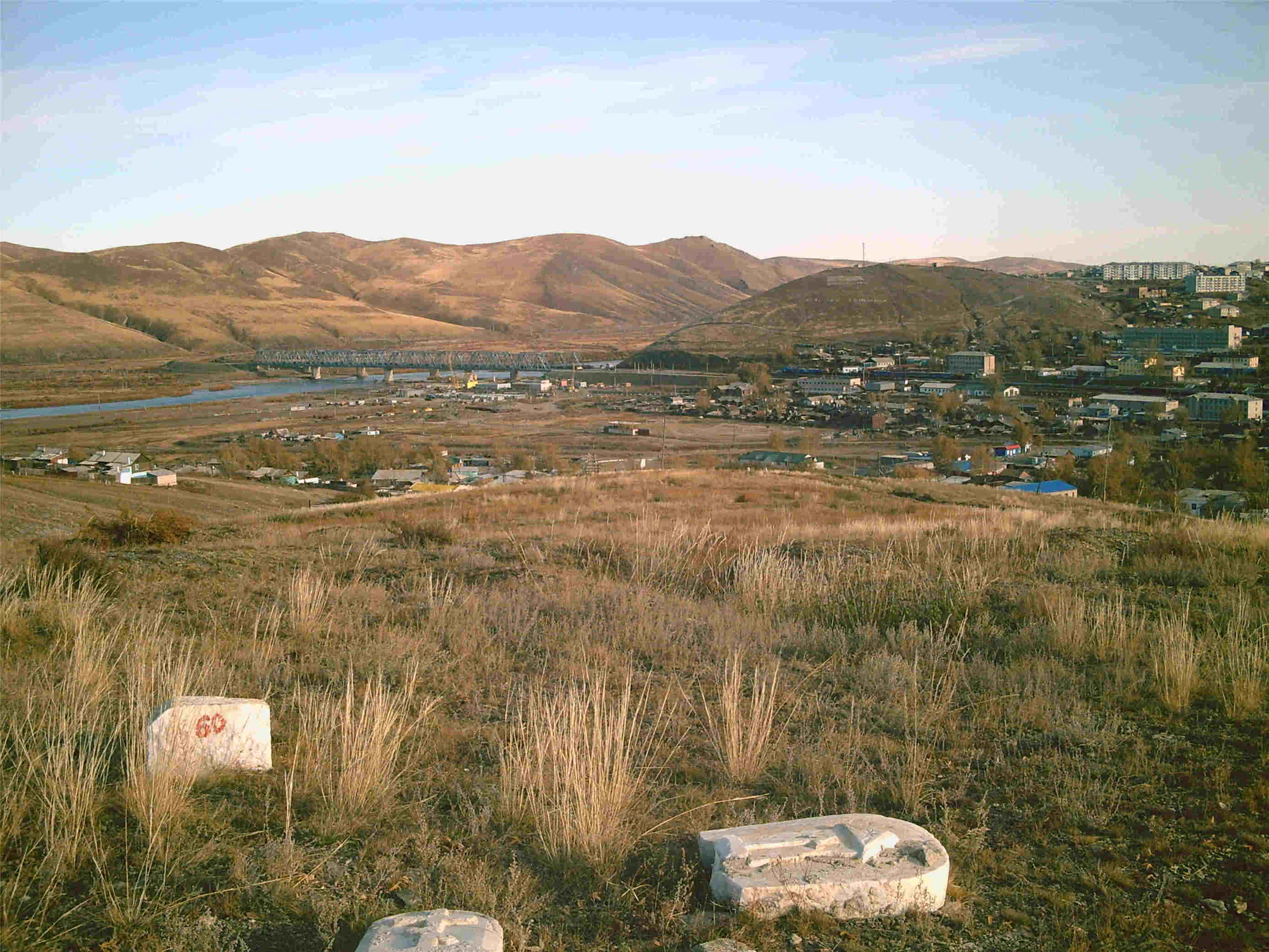
- View of Olovyannaya

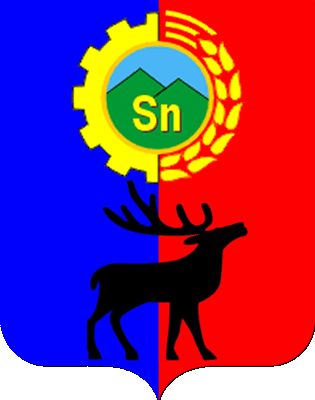
- Coat of arms
- Location of Olovyanninsky District in Zabaykalsky Krai
- Coordinates: 50.936°N 116.251°E
- Country: Russia
- Federal subject: Zabaykalsky Krai
- Established: January 4, 1926
- Administrative center: Olovyannaya

Area
  - Total: 6,300 km^{2} (2,400 sq mi)

Population (2010 Census)
  - Total: 43,494
  - Estimate (2018): 35,921 (−17.4%)
  - Density: 6.9/km^{2} (18/sq mi)
  - Urban: 47.9%
  - Rural: 52.1%

Administrative structure
  - Inhabited localities: 4 urban-type settlements, 30 rural localities

Municipal structure
  - Municipally incorporated as: Olovyanninsky Municipal District
  - Municipal divisions: 4 urban settlements, 16 rural settlements
- Time zone: UTC+9 (MSK+6)
- OKTMO ID: 76632000
- Website: http://xn--b1arhbb7h.xn--80aaaac8algcbgbck3fl0q.xn--p1ai/

Olovyanninsky District (Russian: Оловяннинский райо́н) is an administrative and municipal district (raion), one of the thirty-one in Zabaykalsky Krai, Russia. It is located in the south of the krai, and borders with Baleysky District in the north, Borzinsky District in the south, and with Mogoytuysky District in the west. The area of the district is 6,300 square kilometers (2,400 sq mi). Its administrative center is the urban-type settlement) of Olovyannaya. Population: 43,494 (2010 census); 49,426 (2002 Census); 60,810 (1989 Soviet census). The population of Olovyannaya accounts for 19.3% of the district's total population.

== History ==
The district was established on January 4, 1926.

== See also ==
- Karaksar (air base)
