= Shelopugino =

Shelopugino (Russian: Шелопугино) is the name of several rural localities in Russia:

- Shelopugino, Pskov Oblast, a village in Gdovsky District of Pskov Oblast
- Shelopugino, Zabaykalsky Krai, a selo in Shelopuginsky District of Zabaykalsky Krai
