= Shelopuginsky District =

Shelopuginsky District Шелопугинский район (Russian)
- District
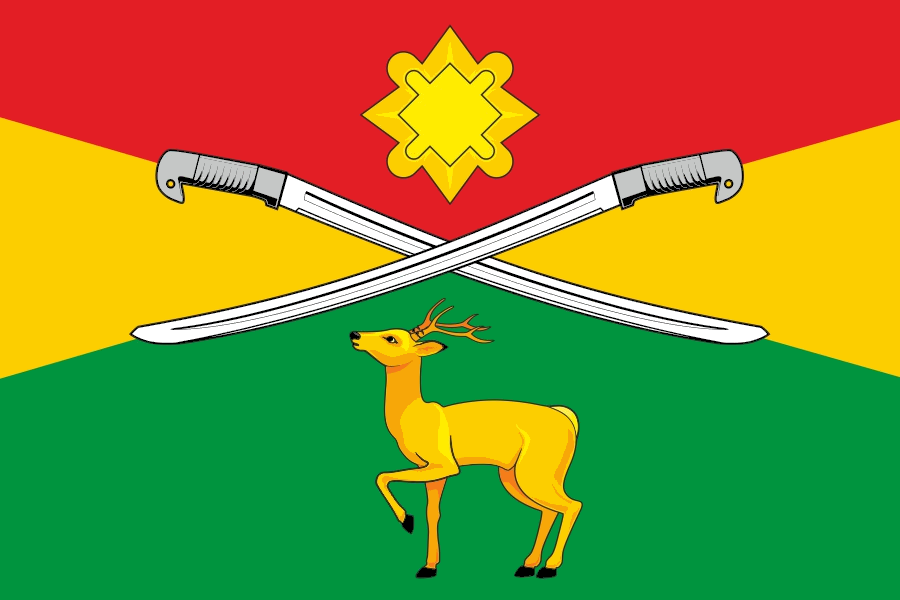
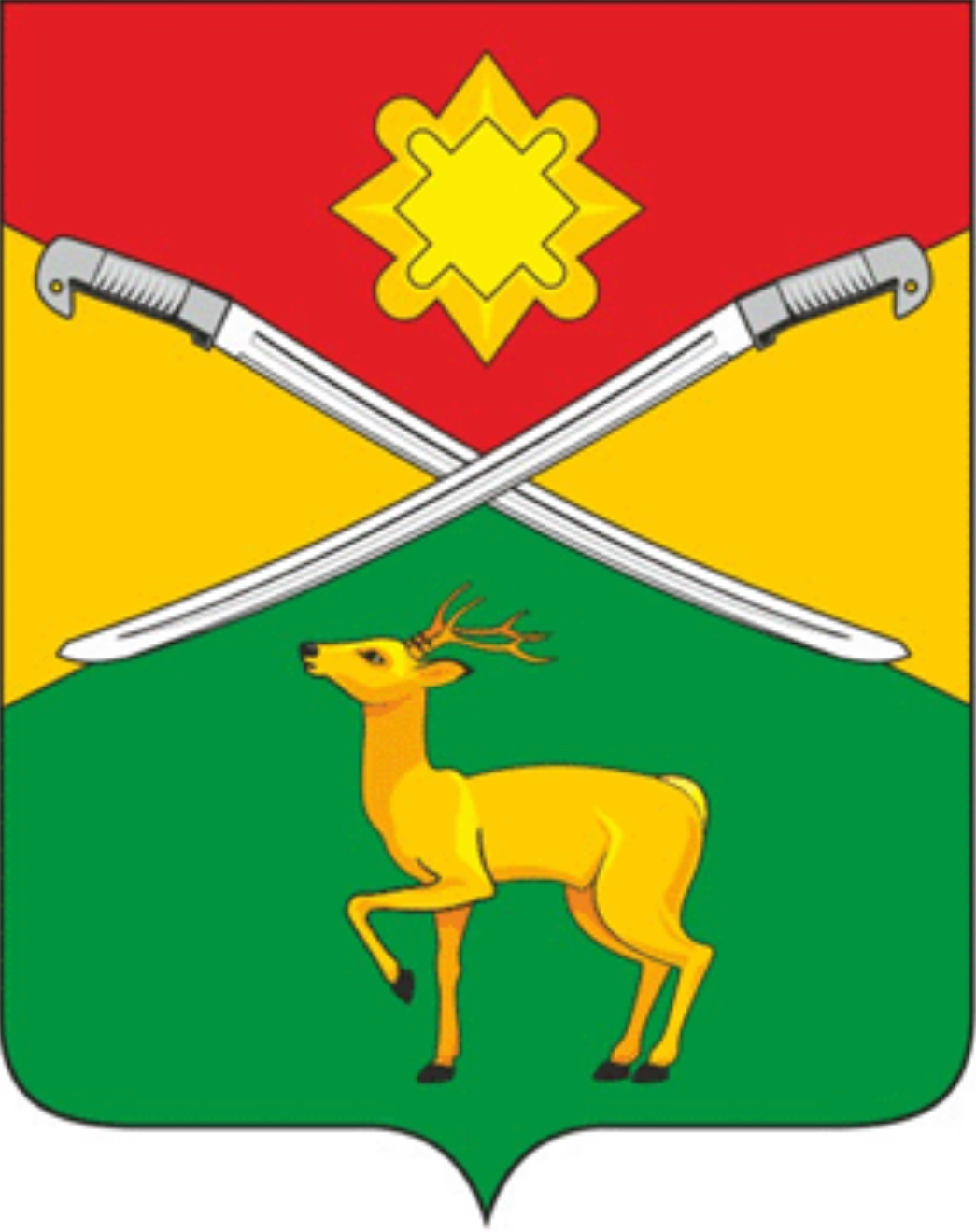
- Flag Coat of arms
- Location of Shelopuginsky District in Zabaykalsky Krai
- Coordinates: 51.667°N 117.758°E
- Country: Russia
- Federal subject: Zabaykalsky Krai
- Established: August 24, 1961
- Administrative center: Shelopugino

Area
  - Total: 3,900 km^{2} (1,500 sq mi)

Population (2010 Census)
  - Total: 8,369
  - Estimate (2018): 6,873 (−17.9%)
  - Density: 2.1/km^{2} (5.6/sq mi)
  - Urban: 0%
  - Rural: 100%

Administrative structure
  - Inhabited localities: 25 rural localities

Municipal structure
  - Municipally incorporated as: Shelopuginsky Municipal District
  - Municipal divisions: 0 urban settlements, 8 rural settlements
- Time zone: UTC+9 (MSK+6)
- OKTMO ID: 76652000
- Website: http://xn--e1amje5b.xn--80aaaac8algcbgbck3fl0q.xn--p1ai/

Shelopuginsky District (Russian: Шелопугинский райо́н) is an administrative and municipal district (raion), one of the thirty-one in Zabaykalsky Krai, Russia. It is located in the center of the krai, and borders with Sretensky District in the north, Gazimuro-Zavodsky District in the east, Aleksandrovo-Zavodsky District in the south, and with Akshinsky District in the west. The area of the district is 3,900 square kilometers (1,500 sq mi). Its administrative center is the rural locality (a selo) of Shelopugino. Population: 8,369 (2010 census); 9,773 (2002 Census); 13,124 (1989 Soviet census). The population of Shelopugino accounts for 39.1% of the district's total population.

== History ==
The district was established on August 24, 1961.
