= Priargunsk =

Priargunsk Приаргунск
- Urban-type settlement
- Interactive map of Priargunsk
- Location of Priargunsk Priargunsk (Zabaykalsky Krai)
- Coordinates: 50°21′N 119°04′E
- Country: Russia
- Federal subject: Zabaykalsky Krai
- Administrative district: Priargunsky District
- Founded: 1953
- Elevation: 517 m (1,696 ft)

Population (2010 Census)
  - Total: 7,388
  - Estimate (1 January 2018): 7,138 (−3.4%)

Administrative status
  - Capital of: Priargunsky District

Municipal status
  - Urban okrug: Priargunskoye Okrug
  - Capital of: Priargunskoye Okrug
- Time zone: UTC+9 (MSK+6)
- Postal code: 674310
- OKTMO ID: 76638151051

Priargunsk (Russian: Приаргунск) is an urban locality (an urban-type settlement) and the administrative center of Priargunsky District in Zabaykalsky Krai, Russia. Population: 7,388 (2010 census); 8,260 (2002 census); 7,954 (1989 Soviet census).

== Geography ==
Priargunsk is on the river Argun. It is located 595 km (by rail) to the south-east. from Chita.

== Climate ==
Priargunsk has a monsoon-influenced humid continental climate (Köppen climate classification Dwb), with warm, humid summers and severe winters.

Climate data for Priargunsk
Month	Jan	Feb	Mar	Apr	May	Jun	Jul	Aug	Sep	Oct	Nov	Dec	Year
Record high °C (°F)	0.0 (32.0)	2.2 (36.0)	18.3 (64.9)	28.4 (83.1)	35.4 (95.7)	41.5 (106.7)	41.8 (107.2)	38.2 (100.8)	36.6 (97.9)	27.3 (81.1)	12.9 (55.2)	2.6 (36.7)	41.8 (107.2)
Mean daily maximum °C (°F)	−21.6 (−6.9)	−15.5 (4.1)	−4.0 (24.8)	9.0 (48.2)	18.3 (64.9)	24.6 (76.3)	25.9 (78.6)	24.0 (75.2)	17.4 (63.3)	7.4 (45.3)	−7.2 (19.0)	−18.7 (−1.7)	5.0 (40.9)
Daily mean °C (°F)	−28.3 (−18.9)	−23.3 (−9.9)	−11.6 (11.1)	1.9 (35.4)	10.7 (51.3)	17.4 (63.3)	19.7 (67.5)	17.3 (63.1)	9.9 (49.8)	−0.1 (31.8)	−14.0 (6.8)	−25.0 (−13.0)	−2.1 (28.2)
Mean daily minimum °C (°F)	−34.8 (−30.6)	−31.3 (−24.3)	−20.1 (−4.2)	−6.2 (20.8)	1.7 (35.1)	9.2 (48.6)	13.0 (55.4)	10.3 (50.5)	2.3 (36.1)	−7.5 (18.5)	−20.8 (−5.4)	−31.3 (−24.3)	−9.6 (14.7)
Record low °C (°F)	−52.8 (−63.0)	−46.4 (−51.5)	−43.9 (−47.0)	−26.1 (−15.0)	−11.2 (11.8)	−2.2 (28.0)	1.0 (33.8)	−2.2 (28.0)	−10.0 (14.0)	−26.0 (−14.8)	−42.2 (−44.0)	−50.0 (−58.0)	−52.8 (−63.0)
Average precipitation mm (inches)	8.3 (0.33)	10.2 (0.40)	14.5 (0.57)	18.3 (0.72)	34.8 (1.37)	73.6 (2.90)	116.9 (4.60)	101.5 (4.00)	51.8 (2.04)	21.6 (0.85)	10.9 (0.43)	13.1 (0.52)	475.5 (18.73)
Average precipitation days	2.8	2.5	2.8	3.1	4.0	6.9	8.5	7.2	5.1	2.8	3.1	3.5	52.3
Source: climatebase.ru

== History ==
It was founded in 1953. On March 30, 1962, by a decree of the Presidium of the Supreme Soviet of the RSFSR, the working settlement of Tsurukhaitui was renamed and became the urban settlement of Priargunsk. An airport operated until the 1990s.

== Economy ==
There is a food factory, JSC Priargunsky Cheese Factory, LLC Agropromtrans, and trucking enterprises. There is district hospital, maternity hospital, and pharmacy.
