= Priargunsky District =

Priargunsky District Приаргунский район (Russian)
- District
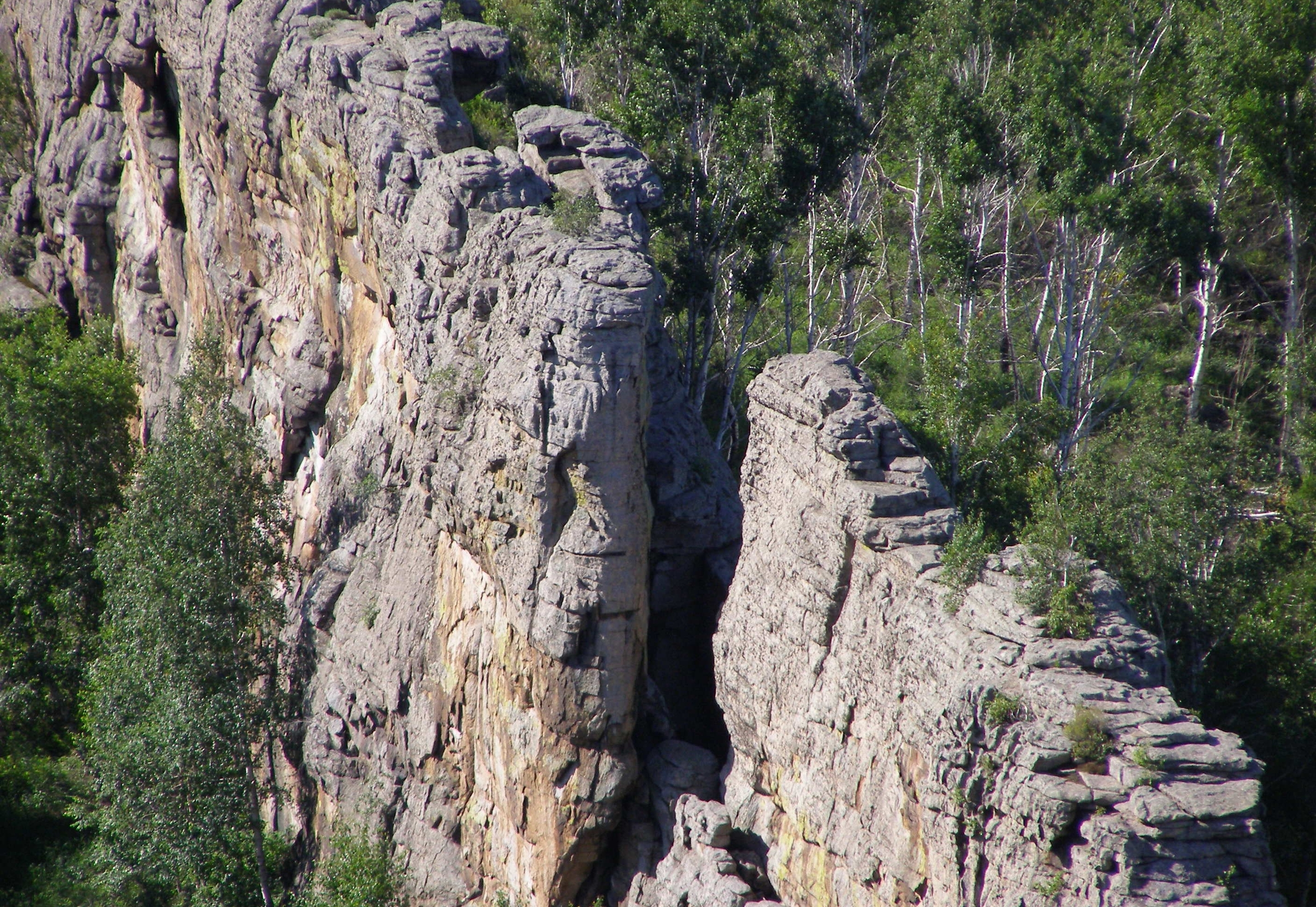
- Byrkine Rocks, Priargunsky District
- Location of Priargunsky District in Zabaykalsky Krai
- Coordinates: 50.432°N 118.773°E
- Country: Russia
- Federal subject: Zabaykalsky Krai
- Established: March 30, 1962
- Administrative center: Priargunsk

Area
  - Total: 5,100 km^{2} (2,000 sq mi)

Population (2010 Census)
  - Total: 21,831
  - Estimate (2018): 19,941 (−8.7%)
  - Density: 4.3/km^{2} (11/sq mi)
  - Urban: 42.0%
  - Rural: 58.0

Administrative structure
  - Inhabited localities: 2 urban-type settlements, 20 rural localities

Municipal structure
  - Municipally incorporated as: Priargunsky Municipal District
  - Municipal divisions: 2 urban settlements, 11 rural settlements
- Time zone: UTC+9 (MSK+6)
- OKTMO ID: 76638000
- Website: http://xn--80agnkoihcls.xn--80aaaac8algcbgbck3fl0q.xn--p1ai/

Priargunsky District (Russian: Приаргунский райо́н) is an administrative and municipal district (raion), one of the thirty-one in Zabaykalsky Krai, Russia. It is located in the southeast of the krai, and borders with Kalgansky District in the north, and with Krasnokamensky District in the south. The area of the district is 5,100 square kilometers (2,000 sq mi). Its administrative center is the urban locality (an urban-type settlement) of Priargunsk. Population: 21,831 (2010 census); 26,959 (2002 Census); 29,120 (1989 Soviet census). The population of Priargunsk accounts for 33.8% of the district's total population.

== History ==
The district was established on March 30, 1962.
