= Yakutsk Time =

Time zone in Russia (UTC+9)

- Time zone

UTC offset
- YAKT: UTC+09:00

Current time
- 12:16, 6 January 2026 YAKT [refresh]

Observance of DST
- DST is not observed in this time zone.

Time in Russia: KALT / Kaliningrad Time / UTC+2 / (MSK−1); MSK / Moscow Time / UTC+3 / (MSK±0); SAMT / Samara Time / UTC+4 / (MSK+1); YEKT / Yekaterinburg Time / UTC+5 / (MSK+2); OMST / Omsk Time / UTC+6 / (MSK+3); KRAT / Krasnoyarsk Time / UTC+7 / (MSK+4); IRKT / Irkutsk Time / UTC+8 / (MSK+5); YAKT / Yakutsk Time / UTC+9 / (MSK+6); VLAT / Vladivostok Time / UTC+10 / (MSK+7); MAGT / Magadan Time / UTC+11 / (MSK+8); PETT / Kamchatka Time / UTC+12 / (MSK+9)

Yakutsk Time (YAKT) is a time zone in Russia which is nine hours ahead of GMT, and six hours ahead of Moscow Time (MSK). The time zone is also known as Asia/Yakutsk in the tz datbase.

The time zone covers Sakha Republic (western part), Amur Oblast and Zabaykalsky Krai.

On 27 March 2011, Russia moved to year-round daylight saving time. Instead of switching between UTC+09:00 in winter and UTC+10:00 in summer, Yakutsk Time became fixed at UTC+10:00 until 2014, when it was reset back to UTC+09:00 year-round.

== IANA time zone database ==
In the zone.tab of the IANA time zone database, the zones with the same current offset are:

c.c.	Coordinates	Timezone name	Comments	UTC offset
RU	+5203+11328	Asia/Chita	MSK+06 – Zabaykalsky	+09:00
RU	+6200+12940	Asia/Yakutsk	MSK+06 – Lena River	+09:00
RU	+623923+1353314	Asia/Khandyga	MSK+06 – Tomponsky, Ust-Maysky	+09:00

== See also ==
- Time in Russia
