= Oldonda =

Oldonda Олдонда
- Selo
- Location within Zabaykalsky Krai Location within Russia
- Coordinates: 50°53′N 116°57′E
- Country: Russia
- Region: Zabaykalsky Krai
- District: Borzinsky District
- Time zone: UTC+9:00

Oldonda (Russian: Олдонда) is a rural locality (a selo) in Borzinsky District, Zabaykalsky Krai, Russia. Population: 69 (2021 census); 107 (2010 census); 203 (2002 census); There are 4 streets in this selo.

== Geography ==
This rural locality is located 63 km from Borzya (the district's administrative centre), 274 km from Chita (capital of Zabaykalsky Krai) and 5,591 km from Moscow. Kurunzulay is the nearest rural locality.
