= Tsagan-Oluy =

Tsagan-Oluy Цаган-Олуй
- Selo
- Location within Zabaykalsky Krai Location within Russia
- Coordinates: 50°28′N 117°09′E
- Country: Russia
- Region: Zabaykalsky Krai
- District: Borzinsky District
- Time zone: UTC+9:00

Tsagan-Oluy (Russian: Цаган-Олуй) is a rural locality (a selo) in Borzinsky District, Zabaykalsky Krai, Russia. Population: 486 (2021 census); 857 (2010 census); 1,561 (2002 census); There are 6 streets in this selo.

== Geography ==
This rural locality is located 46 km from Borzya (the district's administrative centre), 312 km from Chita (capital of Zabaykalsky Krai) and 5,660 km from Moscow. Klyuchevskoye is the nearest rural locality.
