= Borzinsky =

Borzinsky (masculine), Borzinskaya (feminine), or Borzinskoye (neuter) may refer to:

- Borzinsky District, a district of Zabaykalsky Krai, Russia
- Borzinskoye Urban Settlement, a municipal formation which the town of Borzya and a rural locality in Borzinsky District of Zabaykalsky Krai, Russia are incorporated as
