= Ust-Ozyornaya =

Ust-Ozyornaya Усть-Озёрная
- Selo
- Location within Zabaykalsky Krai Location within Russia
- Coordinates: 50°42′N 117°05′E
- Country: Russia
- Region: Zabaykalsky Krai
- District: Borzinsky District
- Time zone: UTC+9:00

Ust-Ozyornaya (Russian: Усть-Озёрная) is a rural locality (a selo) in Borzinsky District, Zabaykalsky Krai, Russia. Population: 281 (2021 census); 452 (2010 census); 642 (2002 census); There are 8 streets in this selo.

== Geography ==
This rural locality is located 53 km from Borzya (the district's administrative centre), 293 km from Chita (capital of Zabaykalsky Krai) and 5,625 km from Moscow. Akuray is the nearest rural locality.
