= Shonoktuy =

Shonoktuy Шоноктуй
- Selo
- Location within Zabaykalsky Krai Location within Russia
- Coordinates: 50°46′N 117°16′E
- Country: Russia
- Region: Zabaykalsky Krai
- District: Borzinsky District
- Time zone: UTC+9:00

Shonoktuy (Russian: Шоноктуй) is a rural locality (a selo) in Borzinsky District, Zabaykalsky Krai, Russia. Population: 200 (2021 census); 200 (2010 census); 200 (2002 census); There are 6 streets in this selo.

== Geography ==
This rural locality is located 68 km from Borzya (the district's administrative centre), 300 km from Chita (capital of Zabaykalsky Krai) and 5,628 km from Moscow. Akuray is the nearest rural locality.
