= Chindant 2-y =

Chindant 2-y Чиндант 2-й
- Selo
- Location within Zabaykalsky Krai Location within Russia
- Coordinates: 50°22′N 116°22′E
- Country: Russia
- Region: Zabaykalsky Krai
- District: Borzinsky District
- Time zone: UTC+9:00

Chindant 2-y (Russian: Чиндант 2-й) is a rural locality (a selo) in Borzinsky District, Zabaykalsky Krai, Russia. Population: 604 (2010 census); 814 (2002 census); There are 5 streets in this selo.

== Geography ==
This rural locality is located 10 km from Borzya (the district's administrative centre), 275 km from Chita (capital of Zabaykalsky Krai) and 5,618 km from Moscow. Borzya is the nearest rural locality.
