= Solovyovsk, Zabaykalsky Krai =

Solovyovsk Соловьёвск
- Selo
- Location within Zabaykalsky Krai Location within Russia
- Coordinates: 49°53′N 115°42′E
- Country: Russia
- Region: Zabaykalsky Krai
- District: Borzinsky District
- Time zone: UTC+9:00

Solovyovsk (Russian: Соловьёвск) is a rural locality (a selo) in Borzinsky District, Zabaykalsky Krai, Russia. Population: 495 (2021 census); 674 (2010 census); 790 (2002 census); There are 12 streets in this selo.

== Geography ==
This rural locality is located 80 km from Borzya (the district's administrative centre), 285 km from Chita (capital of Zabaykalsky Krai) and 5,631 km from Moscow. Kulusutay is the nearest rural locality.
