= Tasyrkhoy =

Tasyrkhoy Тасырхой
- Selo
- Location within Zabaykalsky Krai Location within Russia
- Coordinates: 50°24′N 116°06′E
- Country: Russia
- Region: Zabaykalsky Krai
- District: Borzinsky District
- Time zone: UTC+9:00

Tasyrkhoy (Russian: Тасырхой) is a rural locality (a selo) in Borzinsky District, Zabaykalsky Krai, Russia. Population: 34 (2010 census); 77 (2002 census); There are 2 streets in this selo.

== Geography ==
This rural locality is located 30 km from Borzya (the district's administrative centre), 259 km from Chita (capital of Zabaykalsky Krai) and 5,594 km from Moscow. Chindant 2-y is the nearest rural locality.
