= Khada-Bulak =

Khada-Bulak Хада-Булак
- Selo
- Location within Zabaykalsky Krai Location within Russia
- Coordinates: 50°36′N 116°33′E
- Country: Russia
- Region: Zabaykalsky Krai
- District: Borzinsky District
- Time zone: UTC+9:00

Khada-Bulak (Russian: Хада-Булак) is a rural locality (a selo) in Borzinsky District, Zabaykalsky Krai, Russia. Population: 496 (2021 census); 658 (2010 census); 928 (2002 census); There are 3 streets in this selo.

== Geography ==
This rural locality is located 25 km from Borzya (the district's administrative centre), 268 km from Chita (capital of Zabaykalsky Krai) and 5,600 km from Moscow. Sherlovaya Gora is the nearest rural locality.
