= Konduy =

Konduy Кондуй
- Selo
- Location within Zabaykalsky Krai Location within Russia
- Coordinates: 50°33′N 117°28′E
- Country: Russia
- Region: Zabaykalsky Krai
- District: Borzinsky District
- Time zone: UTC+9:00

Konduy (Russian: Кондуй) is a rural locality (a selo) in Borzinsky District, Zabaykalsky Krai, Russia. Population: 557 (2010 census); 891 (2002 census); There are 2 streets in this selo.

== Geography ==
This rural locality is located 70 km from Borzya (the district's administrative centre), 325 km from Chita (capital of Zabaykalsky Krai) and 5,671 km from Moscow. Aramogoytuy is the nearest rural locality.
