= Klyuchevskoye, Zabaykalsky Krai =

Klyuchevskoye Ключевское
- Selo
- Location within Zabaykalsky Krai Location within Russia
- Coordinates: 50°22′N 116°51′E
- Country: Russia
- Region: Zabaykalsky Krai
- District: Borzinsky District
- Time zone: UTC+9:00

Klyuchevskoye (Russian: Ключевское) is a rural locality (a selo) in Borzinsky District, Zabaykalsky Krai, Russia. Population: 153 (2021 census); 231 (2010 census); 412 (2002 census); There are 8 streets in this selo.

== Geography ==
This rural locality is located 23 km from Borzya (the district's administrative centre), 301 km from Chita (capital of Zabaykalsky Krai) and 5,650 km from Moscow. Borzya is the nearest rural locality.
