= Borzinskiy district Museum =

Museum in Russia

Coordinates: 55.7472°N 37.6050°E

Municipal culture institution the Borzinskiy District Museum (Борзинскому краеведческому музею) is a historical museum in the town of Borzya in Zabaykalsky Krai, Russia. Located at the address: street Pushkin, 25. The museum opened on 2 December 1976.

== History ==
In the 1960s the Chita anti-plague station was transferred to parks zoologist Boris Ilyich Peshkov one of the founders of Borzya Museum. As a student, Boris I. Peshkov was fascinated by taxidermy — the stuffing of animals. He was engaged with his colleague in making stuffed animals in the laboratory called Innokenty Samsonovich by Fedorinin. In 1965, it became clear that the collection needed its own Museum.

Borzinskiy Museum was opened on 2 December 1976 on the basis of the decision number 385 of the Executive Committee of the district Council of deputies of workers. Work began on the creation of historical paintings of the South-East Transbaikalian territory, and a large body of work on local history, local customs and traditions.

In 2003 the nature hall opened, in 2004 a natural history hall and a hall of the history of his native land opened. For the 60th anniversary of the great victory, the hall of history of the great Patriotic war opened. In 2006, the art gallery was added.

== Collection ==
=== Archaeological collection ===
Stone dragon heads, fragments of tiles with Kongousouha Palace from the 13-14 centuries.

Stone tools — scrapers, adzes, cutters, and piercers. stone cores, plates, chips, etc., belonging mainly to the Bronze Age.

The remains of armor plates, iron arrowheads, buckles, and coins are dated from the 6-13th centuries

=== Paleontological collection ===
The paleontological collections of the Borzya Museum were commenced in 70-th years of the last century. The bulk of the collection comes from the Kharanorskaya coal mine, from which the Museum received the skull of a woolly rhinoceros, the end part of the Tusk and teeth of a mammoth, and frontal part with the remnants of the horns and teeth of prehistoric bull (bison).

This part of the collection relates to Quaternary Period of the Cenozoic era (the Holocene — Neopleistocene), using the geologic time scale, or to the stone age (Paleolithic and Neolithic).

In the 1970-80s the Museum received the skull of a brown bear and a collection of skulls of rodents from B. I. Peshkov.

120 mA) Catena — change of vegetation from the edge of a river through the slope to the watershed.

In addition, the Museum has a collection gathered by the expedition of S. M. Tit on-site Olovyanninskiy district, in the so-called "Exposures of Middendorf". This place has been known since the 1840s, when on the right Bank of the river Turgay a shepherd found stone tiles with remains of fish, shells and the wings of insects.
