= Eberswalde Hoard =

Bronze Age hoard of 81 gold objects

Coordinates: 52°50′46″N 13°43′23″E

The Eberswalde Hoard or Treasure of Eberswalde (German: Eberswalder Goldschatz or Goldfund von Eberswalde) is a Bronze Age hoard of 81 gold objects with a total weight of 2.59 kg (83 ozt). The largest prehistoric assembly of gold objects ever found in Germany, it is considered to be one of the most important finds from the Central European Bronze Age. Its production has been attributed to the Nordic Bronze Age culture. Today, it is in Russia, as part of the group of artifacts and works of art stolen from Germany at the end of the Second World War.

== Discovery ==
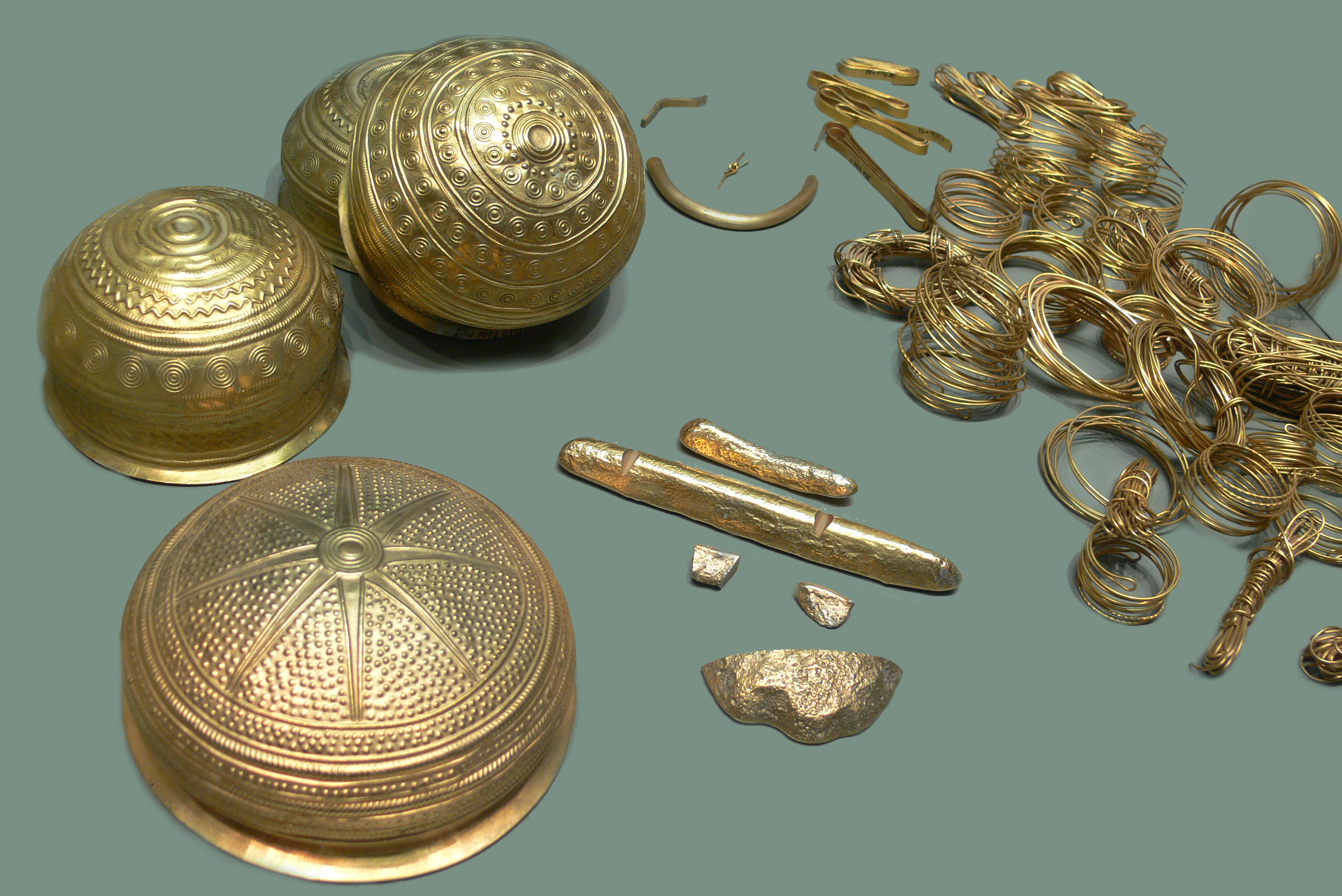
Items from the Eberswalde Hoard (replica; Museum für Vor- und Frühgeschichte, Berlin)

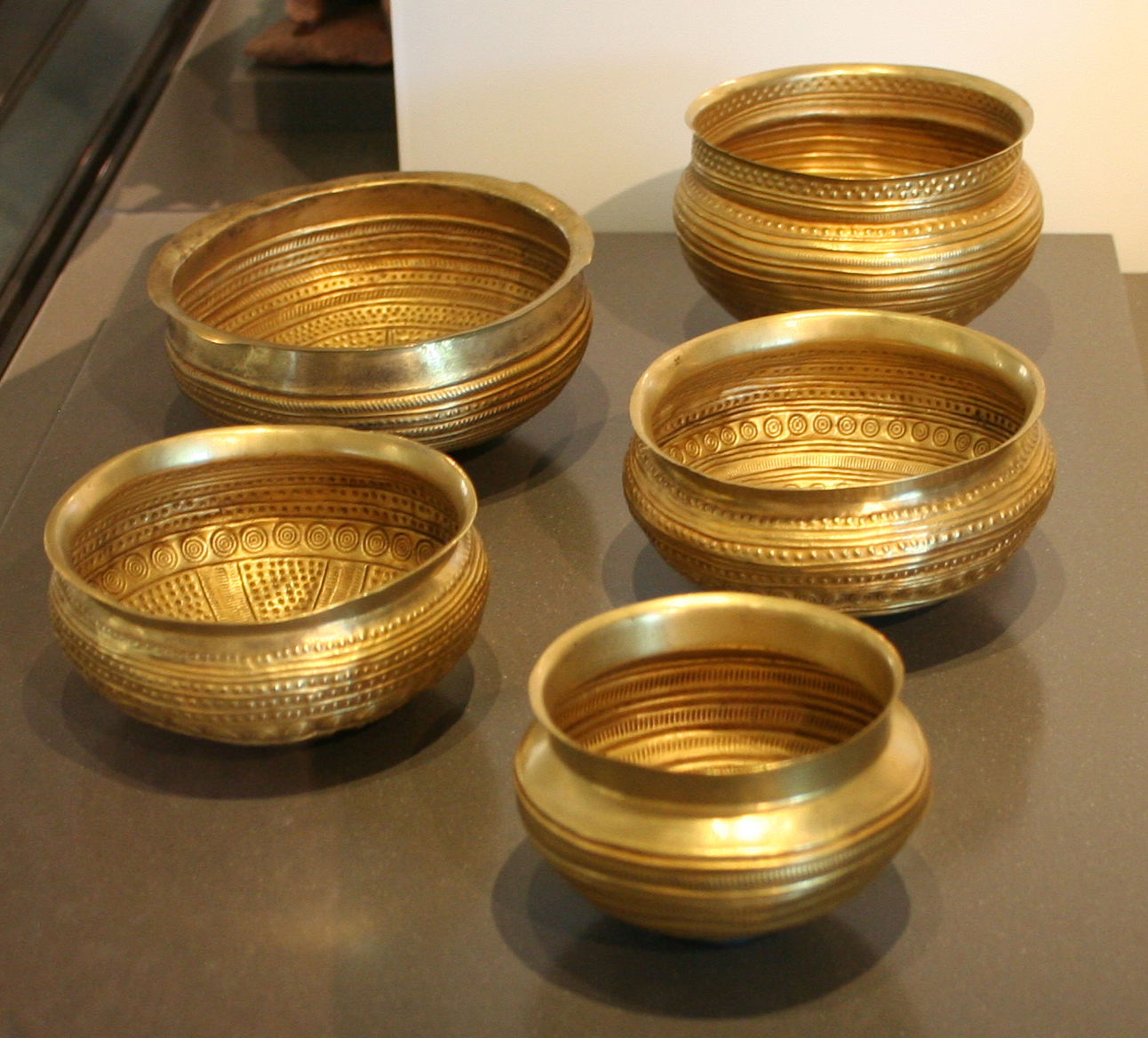
Eberswalde Hoard gold bowls (replica)

The hoard was discovered 1 m (3 ft) below the ground surface on May 16, 1913, during excavations for a house within the grounds of a brass factory at Finow (Oberbarnim), part of Eberswalde in Brandenburg. The factory supervisor alerted Carl Schuchhardt, the director of the Prehistoric Department of the Royal Museums at Berlin, who acceded the hoard to that collection.

== Description ==
The hoard had been deposited in a globular vessel with a lid. In it were eight gold bowls, which contained another 73 gold objects. The bowls were thin-walled chased gold vessels with copious ornamental decoration. The other objects included neck rings, bracelets and 60 wire arm spirals. 55 double spirals were tied into bundles. A gold ingot, a piece of metal shaped like a crucible and two smaller pieces probably represent raw material for the production of such objects. The treasure belongs to the goldsmith known as Villena-type, for its resemblance to the Treasure of Villena.

== Origin and date ==
The hoard used to be thought to represent the stores of a merchant, but more recent research suggests that it was of religious significance. The hoard is dated to the 9th century BC.

== Similar artefacts ==
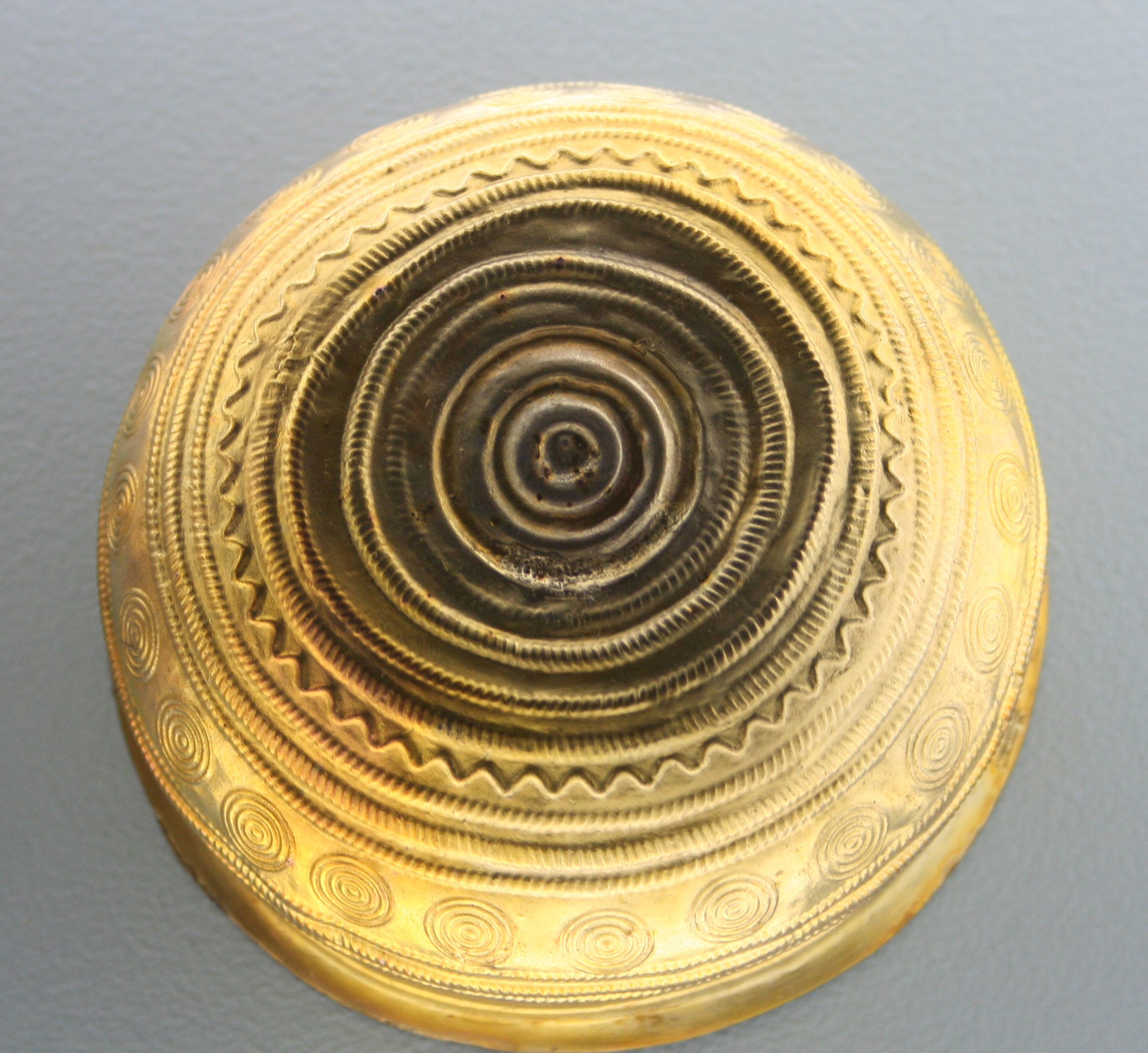
Eberswalde Hoard

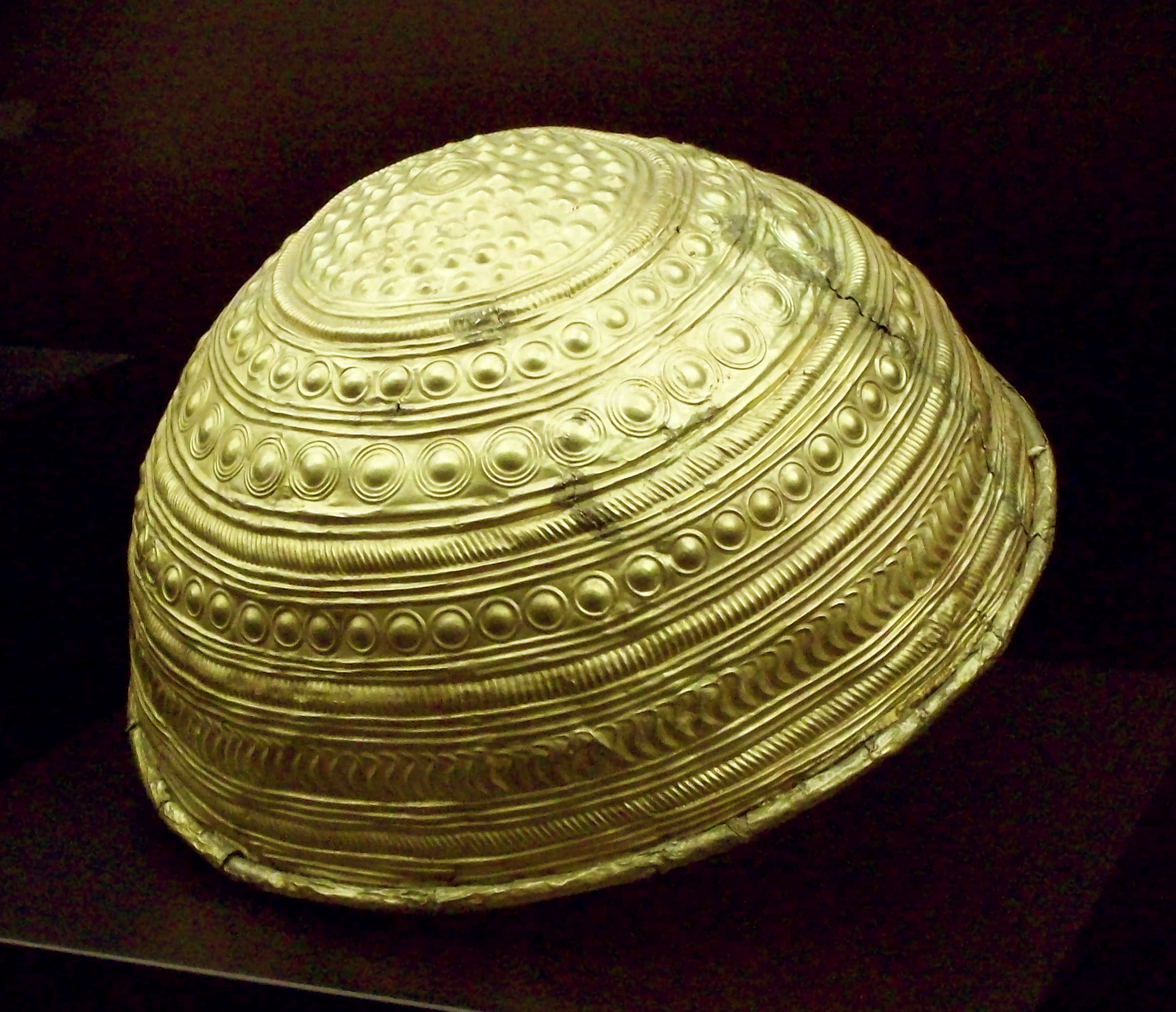
One of the two bowls found in Axtroki, Spain. Iberian Bronze Age

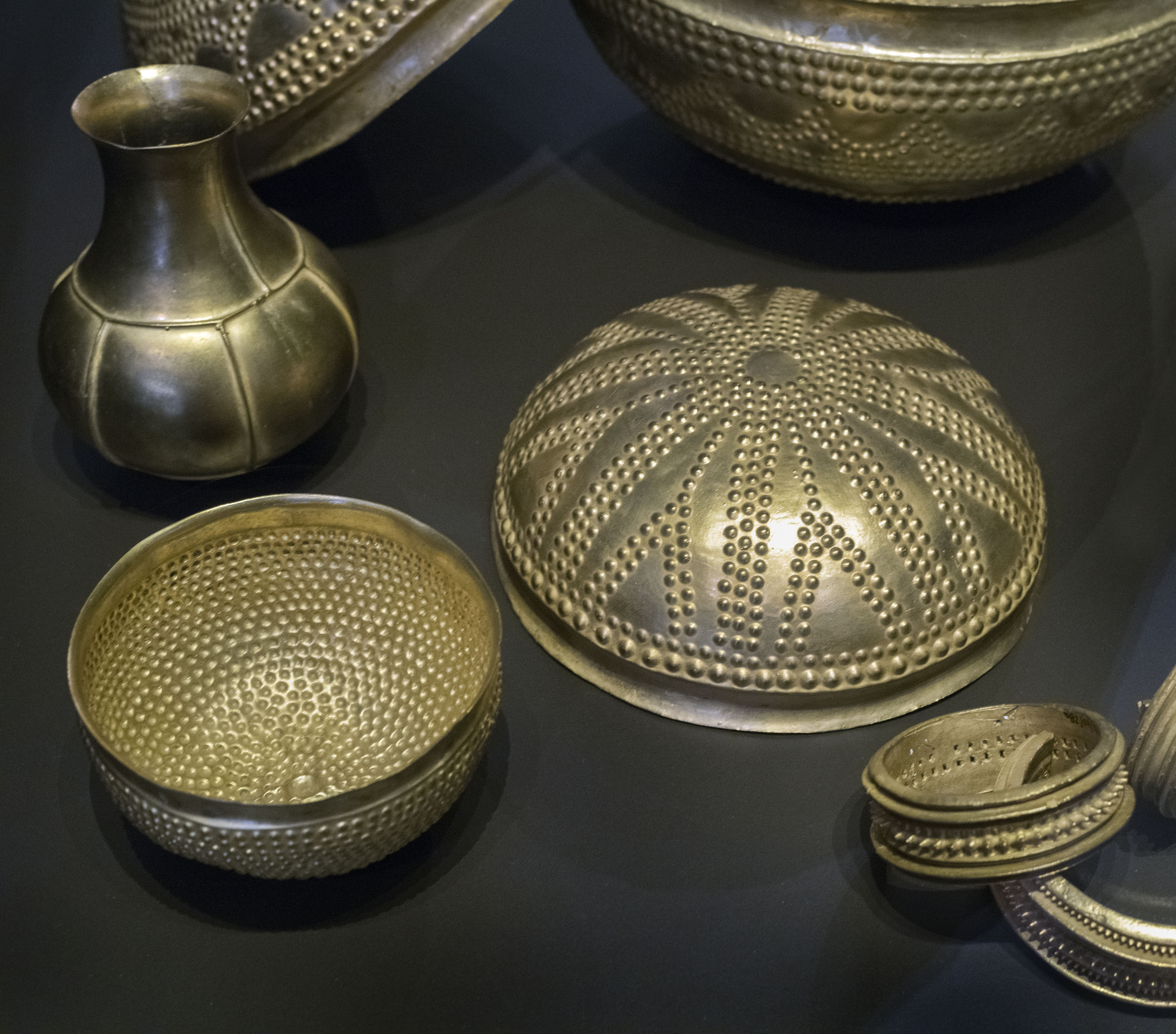
Treasure of Villena, Spain. Iberian Bronze Age, c. 1300-1000 BC

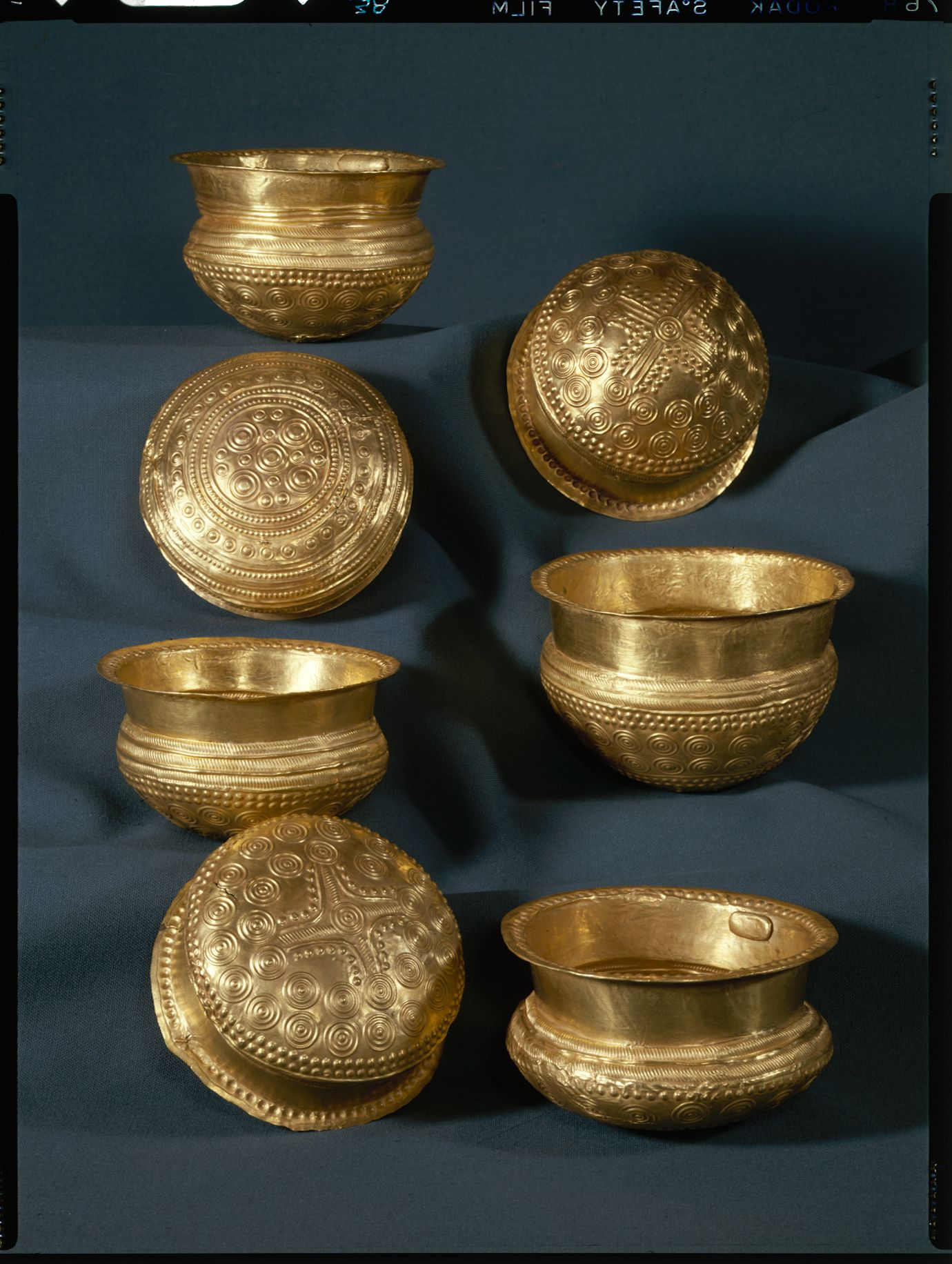
Gold bowls from Midskov, Denmark. Nordic Bronze Age, c. 1000 BC

== Later history ==
After the end of the Second World War in 1945, the Eberswalde Hoard disappeared from the Berlin museum, along with the so-called "Treasure of Priam". The suspicion that the Red Army might have removed both finds was denied by the Soviets for decades. After Russian president Boris Yeltsin admitted that "Priam's Treasure" was in Russian hands, the authorities ceased to explicitly deny that they also held Eberswalde Hoard. In 2004, a reporter from the German magazine Der Spiegel located it in a secret depot within Moscow's Pushkin Museum. Germany has requested return of the materials, and the issue has caused tension between the German and the Russian governments. Reproductions of the hoard are on display at the Museum für Vor- und Frühgeschichte in Berlin and the Stadt- und Kreismuseum in Eberswalde. The Eberswalde replica is by local goldsmith Eckhard Herrmann.

== See also ==
- Golden hat
- Nordic Bronze Age
- Urnfield culture
- Caergwrle Bowl

== Literature ==
- Carl Schuchhardt: Der Goldfund vom Messingwerk bei Eberswalde. Berlin 1914.
