= Looting by Russian forces during the Russian invasion of Ukraine =

Security camera footage captured in February 2022 showing a group of Russian soldiers sending parcels to Russia from a delivery company office in Belarus.

Since the beginning of the Russian invasion of Ukraine in February 2022, the media have been publishing eyewitness accounts of widespread looting by the Russian soldiers deployed in Ukraine. International organizations such as Human Rights Watch, as well as Ukrainian, European and Russian independent media and NGOs document and investigate cases of looting and transportation of stolen personal items and industrial equipment to the territory of Russia and Belarus.

== History ==
On the third day of the invasion, food stores were looted, there was a video on the Internet in which Russian soldiers took out a safe from a bank in the Kherson region.

In March, farmers from Kherson, Cherkasy and Kyiv regions testified that their cars and products were taken from them. From the outskirts of the captured Melitopol, 27 John Deere farming vehicles were stolen – tractors, seeders, combines – each of which costs at least 300 thousand US dollars. Since all the equipment is equipped with GPS navigation systems, the owners managed to track its movement – at the end of April, the cars ended up in the Chechen village of Zakan-Yurt, however, inoperative, since the anti-theft system allows for remote blocking. According to CNN, Russian military trucks transport wheat to Crimea from Zaporizhzhian warehouses and Melitopol.

In early June, The Washington Post, citing the head of the State Agency of Ukraine for the management of the exclusion zone, Yevgeny Kramarenko, reported that the Russian military caused damage to the Chernobyl nuclear power plant that cost Ukraine an amount of more than 135 million US dollars. 698 computers, 344 cars, and 1500 dosimeters were stolen or destroyed, as well as almost all fire fighting equipment needed to fight forest fires in the exclusion zone. Part of the equipment, according to GPS sensors, was located on the territory of Belarus.

After returning to their homes, residents of the village of Novyi Bykiv, Chernihiv Oblast, found that their apartments were looted, household appliances, women's perfumes, electronics, and upholstered furniture were stolen. Residents who remained in the village during the days of the occupation saw how things were loaded into the Ural army trucks. Computers and projectors disappeared from the village school. It was also reported about the looting of the village of Staryi Bykiv. Mass robberies were recorded in Irpin. One of the local families told The Guardian that all clothes and shoes were stolen from their house, including women's underwear and dresses. Citizens testify that cash, jewelry and simple household items were stolen from their homes, provided by residents of the villages of Grebelki, Velyka Dymerka, Vilkhivki. Human Rights Watch staff also documented Ukrainian testimonies of robberies, for example, in the city of Dymer, Kyiv Oblast. Shaun Walker, a journalist of The Guardian, received numerous testimonies from local residents in the city of Trostyanets about the facts of murders and robberies committed during the period of control of the city by Russian troops. For example, the owner of a beauty salon, Daria Sasina, said that her salon was looted, taking all cosmetics, furniture and paintings from the walls. A resident of the Chernihiv Oblast in an interview said that during the retreat, Russian soldiers took the toilet bowl from her house.

The Ukrainian news published recordings of "interceptions" of telephone conversations between Russian soldiers and their families, in which thefts from shops and abandoned apartments are discussed. From one of the recordings, the soldier says that his colleagues “dragged bags” of the loot, on the other recording, he receives a list of things that he is asked to bring. The media noted that it is impossible to establish the authenticity of the recordings in wartime, but territoriality, they coincide with the zones that were under Russian occupation.

According to the Minister of Defense of Ukraine, a market was opened in the Belarusian city of Narovlya selling items stolen in Ukraine, these include: motorcycles, bicycles, household appliances, toys, furniture, carpets, etc. were sold there. Columns of trucks in the direction of Narovlya were moving from Buryn. Data on the movement of devices lead to robberies - this is available for most Apple gadgets and accessories. Their Ukrainian owners saw by geolocation that things from their apartments were in Russia. In other cases, the geolocation of stolen AirPods was used to track the movement of Russian army units. On April 18, 2022, on the VKontakte social network, user Yuri Zverev posted a question on how to legalize a BMW SUV brought to the Tver region from Ukraine. On April 20, the group was blocked at the request of the Prosecutor General's Office of the Russian Federation. Later, denying appeared on the Internet from members of the Zverev family, who claimed that his account was hacked and the message was not posted by him.

On May 1, the Ukrainian Ministry of Defense claimed that ventilators and other equipment provided since 2014 by international donors and the government of Ukraine had been removed from a hospital in Starobilsk.

In May 2022, a refugee from Ukraine identified her property in a photograph circulating on the Internet with a tank filmed in the Popasna area were loaded with civilian belongings. According to her, the photo was taken five minutes away from her house, and the tank recently brought children's sheets with Disney prints, a blanket and tablecloth from a country house, a sealed heating tank, which she recently bought and did not have time to install in the apartment.

In November 2022, during the Russian withdrawal from Kherson, Russian zookeeper Oleg Zubkov stole numerous animals from the Kherson Zoo, including a raccoon that would become known as the Raccoon of Kherson due to its unusual prominence in Russian propaganda. The raccoon was subject to numerous internet memes mocking Russian forces and their looting.

In June 2023 Russian media reported complaints of residents of Belgorod oblast in Russia sent to its governor about Russian troops looting their houses and property in the area after they were dispatched there to reinforce the border protection.

In October 2024 Russian-Chechen general Apti Alaudinov gave an interview in which he openly stated that "everyone was taking them", speaking of theft of farming equipment from the occupied territories. Russian military blogger Mikhail Kalashnikov asked him about reports of "Akhmat" looting but Alaudinov said his unit did not steal anything, because "nobody has stopped us", meaning Russian law enforcement. Both also confirmed widespread looting from the territories of DPR and LPR.

== Journalistic investigations ==
The Mediazona project published an investigation in which it tracked an unusual surge in the growth of parcels from the cities of Armiansk, Boguchar, Valuyka, Dzhankoy, Zheleznogorsk, Klimovo, Klintsy, Mozyr, Novozybkov, Pokrovskoe, Rossosh, Rylskv and Unecha to Russia through the delivery service SDEK coinciding with the start of the war. According to the publication, in three months the military could redirect 58 tons of things in this way. Numerous footage from surveillance cameras inside delivery points, in which people in military uniform brought backpacks with things into the departments and wrapped them in packaging film, got onto the Internet. The largest number of parcels was sent to the Russian cities of Rubtsovsk, Yurga, Chebarkul, Miass, Kyzyl, Chita, Biysk and Borzya. On April 29, 2022, a video was published in which a Russian officer allegedly sent the Orlan-10 drone, which is in service with the Russian army, from the SDEK point in Valuyki. The Belarusian Gayun reported that Russian soldiers bought a lot of goods in the shops of the Belarusian Mozyr and also sent them to Russia also with the help of the SDEK service, but this can it only explains part of the parcels. Against the backdrop of the scandal that arose, SDEK turned off broadcasts from its branches located on the border with Ukraine.

== Criminal prosecution ==
On June 2, the Ukrainian police announced that they had opened criminal cases of looting against ten Russian soldiers from the National Guard unit No. 6720 stationed in Rubtsovsk. The soldiers face up to 12 years in prison.

== Russian statements ==
Representatives of the Russian Foreign Ministry have repeatedly accused the Ukrainian side of filming staged videos of looting by Russian soldiers.

== See also ==
- Nazi plunder
- Soviet plunder
- 2022 Russian theft of Ukrainian grain
- Art theft and looting by Russia during the invasion of Ukraine
- Ukrainian cultural heritage during the 2022 Russian invasion
- Looting of Poland in World War II
