= Soviet plunder =

Seizure of property by the Soviet Union

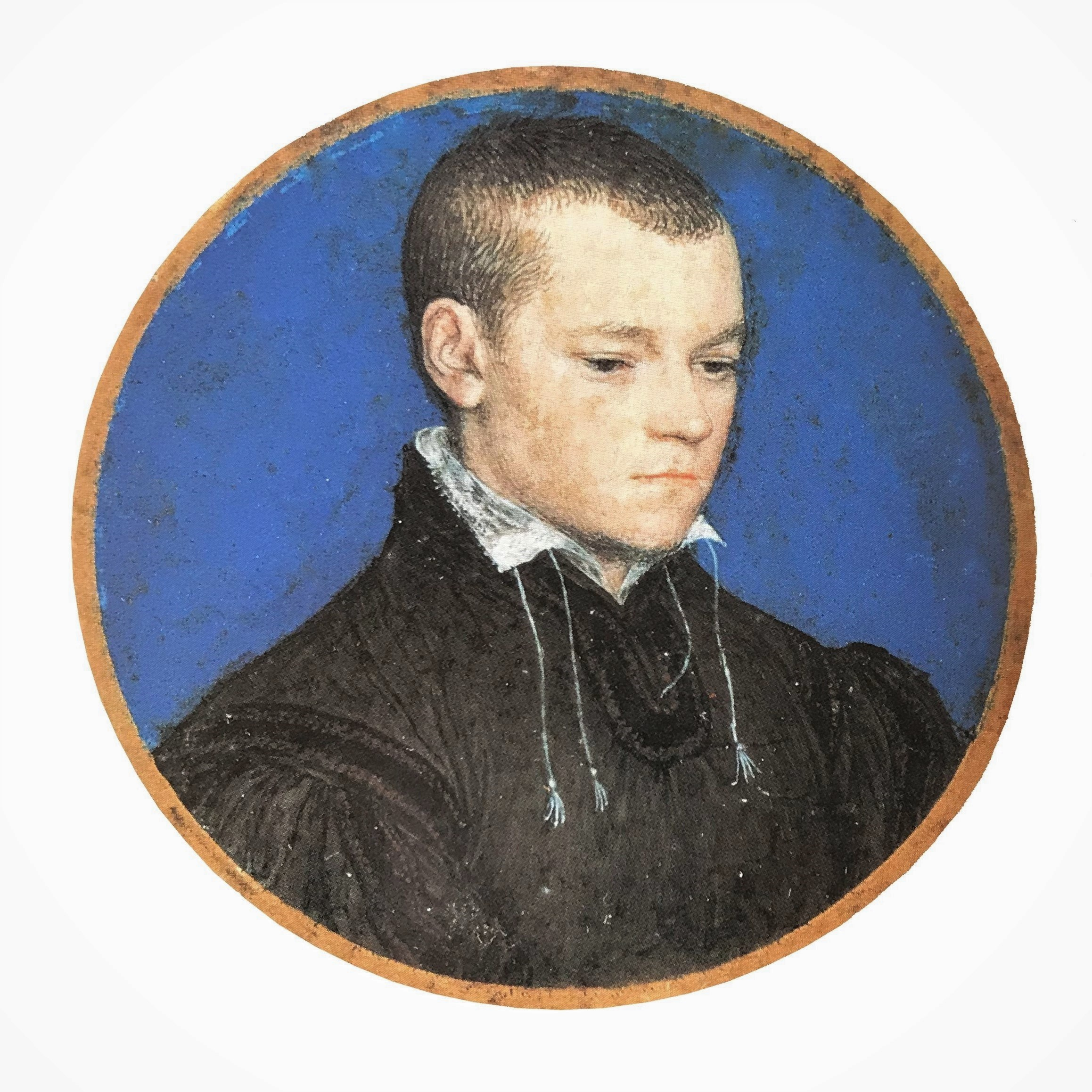
Portrait of Gregory Cromwell, c. 1535–40, Hans Holbein the Younger. Initially looted from the Danzig Museum by the Nazis, it was later seized by the Soviets and is currently in the Pushkin Museum, Moscow.

During and after World War II, large-scale looting and seizure of cultural, industrial, and personal property took place in areas of Central and Eastern Europe at the hands of the Soviet armed forces.

The art seizure happened after the plunder of Russian and related culture's art treasures by the German soldiers and 'art brigades' during the initial years of World War II when Germany rapidly advanced into Russian territory. From the Soviet government perspective, it was an attempt at self accomplished reparations for the USSR's wartime cultural losses, coupled with the traditional desire for enrichment exhibited by the victorious soldiers. The looted items ranged from artworks and museum collections to industrial equipment and household goods. Despite some early post-Soviet efforts at restitution, Russia has largely maintained legal and political justifications for retaining these materials, often citing them as compensation for Nazi crimes against the USSR, and ignoring the fact that some of the items it holds belonged to other victims of Nazi looting.

== Background ==
Plunder and looting has been a traditional consequence of military activities through human history. Russian forces have plundered before the establishment of the USSR, for example during World War I, and in the conflicts following it, such as the Soviet invasion of Poland in the aftermath of World War I.

== World War II ==
=== Bureau of Experts ===
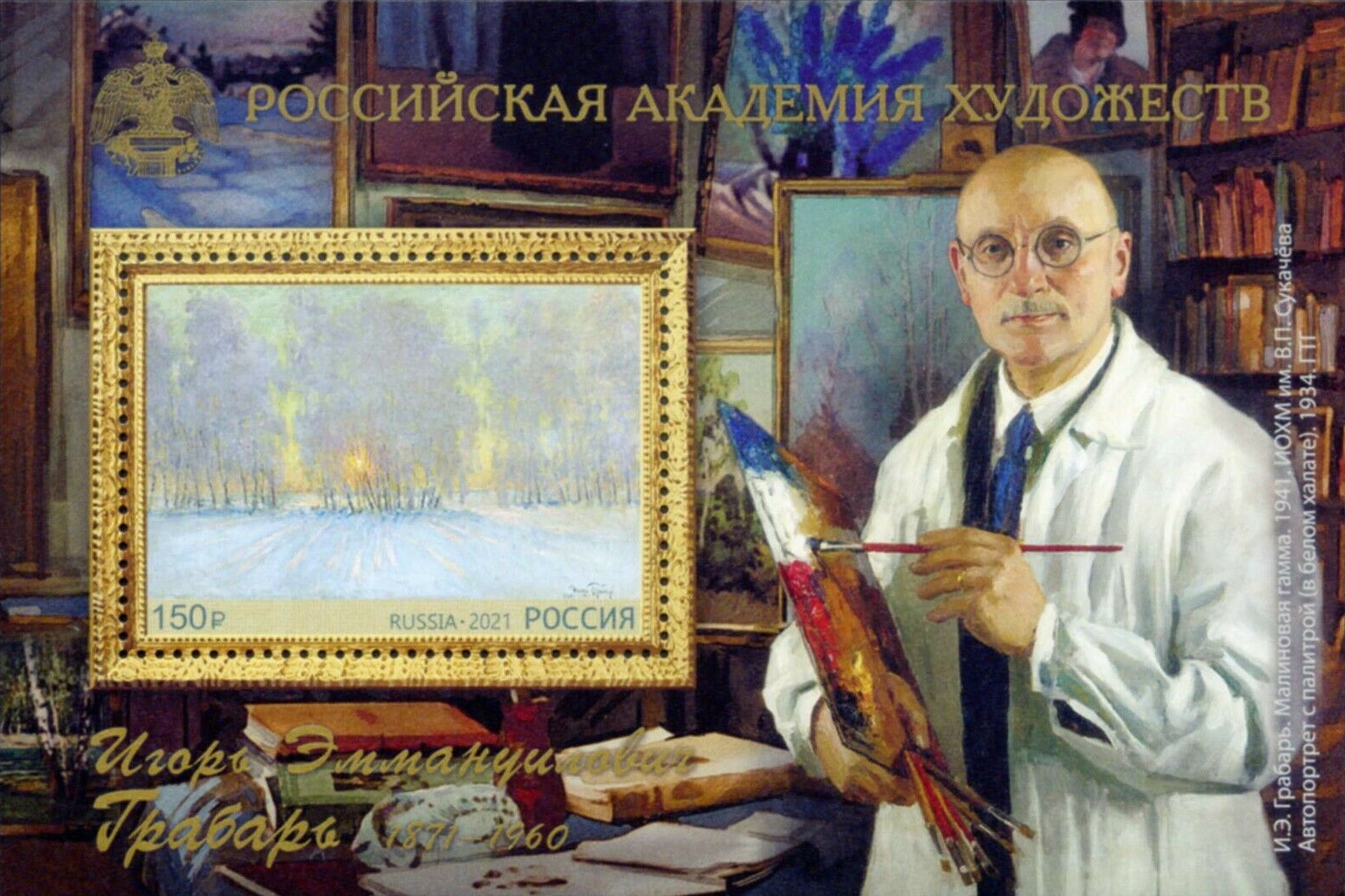
A 2021 Russian stamp sheet featuring a 1934 self-portrait of Grabar and his paintings

In 1943 Soviet artist and scholar Igor Grabar proposed tit-for-tat compensation of Soviet art treasures destroyed in World War II with art to be taken from Germany. The idea was approved by the Soviet authorities, leading to the establishment of the Bureau of Experts, tasked with compiling lists of items which the USSR wanted to receive as "restitution in kind" to compensate for its own cultural losses, both from state institutions but also from various private collections. The Bureau was headed by Grabar himself; its other members included Viktor Lazarev and Sergei Troinitsky. While this topic would be subject to discussion among Allies of World War II, eventually it was not subject to any common ruling. Estimating the losses proved difficult, since many Soviet cultural institutions had no reliable catalogues, and the poorly developed art market in Russia made establishing market value of many Russian works of art virtually impossible. Additionally, once the Soviet forces entered non-Soviet territories, they quickly engaged in large-scale and poorly documented looting, while refusing to provide the lists of items removed from the Soviet occupation zone in Germany. The Bureau's own list was not finished until 1946, and even then it was highly incomplete.

=== Looting by individuals ===
In 1944 a Soviet counteroffensive on the Eastern Front succeeded in pushing German troops back, and Soviet troops began entering non-Soviet territories. On December 26, 1944, an official Soviet decree authorized soldiers to mail packages, monthly, from the front, with the weight varying according to rank (5 kg (11 lb) for rank-and-file soldiers, 10 kg (22 lb) for officers, and 15 kg (33 lb) for generals). It was inspired by a similar system introduced by the German army, and "was considered an open invitation to [Soviet] soldiers to seize what they could" and the beginning of the Soviet institutionalization of looting. This resulted in a significant increase of the packages sent by Soviet soldiers, which led to the overburdening of the official system. In turn, families of soldiers began to make requests of specific types of items (such as items of clothing) that they wanted to be "acquired". Soldiers also carried large packages when returning home; in extreme cases individual soldiers had declared "bags" weighting close to a ton.

Polish territories were among the first non-Soviet territories that the Red Army units entered. However, Polish authorities were generally not allowed to assume control over a town for several days after it was occupied by the Soviet forces, which was understood as a period of grace during which the Red Army soldiers were allowed to loot it. In some cases, looting and victory celebrations by the Red Army soldiers led to additional damage, for examples from fires (over 80% of the Polish town of Lubawa was damaged by a fire attributed to the drunk Red Army soldiers celebrating their capture of the town). Bogdan Musiał estimates that through large scale vandalism and arson, that "In pre-war East German territories, Red Army soldiers destroyed more cultural assets and works of art than they managed to confiscate and take to the USSR." Complaints by Polish communist authorities about looting by Soviet soldiers were often ignored by the relevant Soviet authorities; in extreme cases, this even led to violent clashes between Red Army soldiers and police forces operated by the Polish communists. The devastation and robberies became increasingly severe in territories Soviets considered to be German.

=== Institutionalized looting and the trophy brigades ===
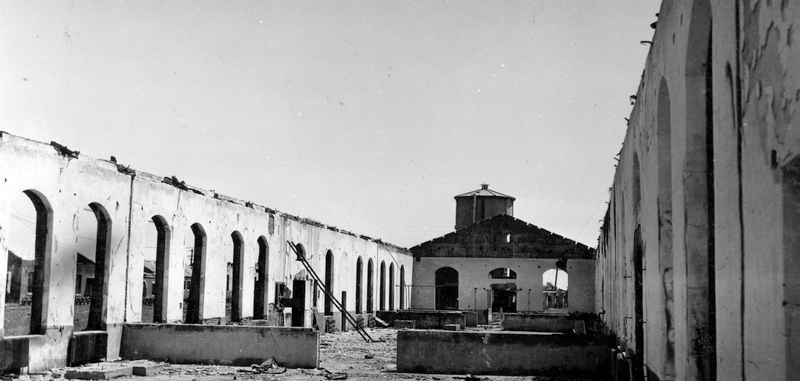
A Changchun battery and plumbing shop looted by Soviet troops in 1946

In February 1945, shortly after returning from the Yalta Conference Joseph Stalin issued several decrees outlining the principles and rules for the Soviet removal of cultural and industrial property from foreign territories controlled by the Red Army. They concerned not only German territories, but also other regions, such as Axis-aligned countries like Hungary, and also Allied countries, such as Poland or China (in territories captured from the Japanese, particularly in Manchuria). This led to institutionalized looting carried out by specialized groups operating on the orders of the Soviet government, the so-called Soviet "trophy brigades", composed of experts including art historians, museum officials, artists and restorers, tasked with finding objects of cultural value to be seized and sent to the USSR. Items seized were stored in places called "trophy warehouses". The brigades were operated by several agencies of the Soviet government; their coordination was poor and in some cases, they were described as competing with each other.

In addition to art, household and luxury items (clothing, furniture, vehicles), other major categories of items seized by the Soviets included scientific (see Russian Alsos), and, in particular, industrial equipment. Bank vaults were also emptied. Soviets dismantled and moved entire industrial plants, leaving empty walls. They also removed infrastructure elements, such as thousands of kilometers of train tracks. The first theater of operations for the trophy brigades, in February 1945, was the German part of Silesia and adjacent areas. Once stripped of items of interest to the Soviets, these would be handed over to Poland, as Recovered Territories. In a number of cases, the Soviets also looted areas which were part of the Second Polish Republic in the interwar period (for example, the towns of Września, Włocławek and Grudziądz). In other cases, the Soviet authorities, after initial looting of an industrial object, relinquished it to the Polish communist authorities for repair, then seized it again for another round of looting, before returning it again.

As the war ended, the Soviet Union also instituted rules legitimizing "trophy" purchases, some covered by the state, and based on soldier's rank. Anecdotal evidence from the period suggested that some highly placed officials, such as General Georgy Zhukov, acquired so much loot that they chartered entire planes to carry it. In better documented examples, from June 1945, Red Army generals in Germany and similar territories could receive, at no cost, a car, while lesser officers were offered motorcycle or bicycles. Other items distributed by the Soviet authorities to its personnel, at no cost or for a small fee, included items such as furniture (including pianos and clocks), wristwatches, carpets, cameras and similar items. Even more items were traded on the black market. This resulted in a significant influx to the Soviet Union of luxury items initially acquired and used by the family members of the military personnel serving in non-Soviet, occupied territory.

== After the war ==
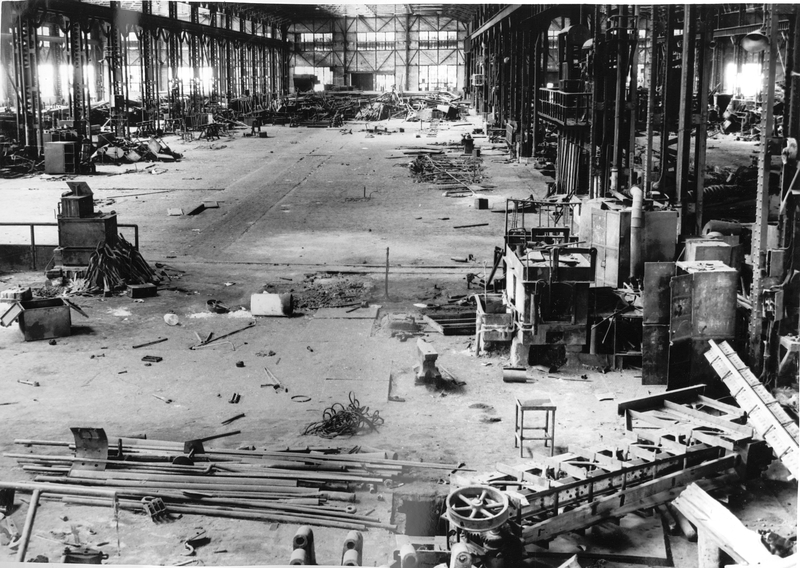
Manchuria Sumitomo Metal Industry in Anshan, China, looted by USSR Army in 1946

Konstantin Akinsha wrote that "by the second part of 1945 the necessity to compensate for Soviet cultural losses by equally important artifacts from specifically named German collections was forgotten and replaced by the concept of total removal of cultural property from the Soviet-occupied territories".

After the war, the process of looting was further transformed into that of war reparations (specifically, the World War II reparations). Soviet looting of occupied territories, including those nominally under control of their allies, such as Polish, continued for several years after the war ended.

The vast amount of industrial loot (machinery, resources, and associated technologies) have been described as a significant factor for the fast rebuilding of the USSR after the war, leading to its emerging as a global power in the second half of the 20th century.

During the occupation of Germany the Soviets destroyed or looted a large amount of historical artifacts from German and Austrian museums, with a large emphasis on artifacts pertaining to military history. According to the German Historical Museum(formerly the Prussian Military Museum) in Berlin, which housed many rare military items including Prince Friedrich Karl of Prussia's infamous weapons collection, the Soviets destroyed one third of their collection, and another third was taken to Warsaw and Moscow. Some of the items were returned by Poland after the fall of the Soviet Union. The Museum of Military History in Vienna, which housed many of Austria's rarest military artifacts, had forty percent of their collection stolen or destroyed by the Soviets. Almost the entire collections of small arms, rifles, modern uniforms, and models were lost.

=== Concealment and museum storage ===
Initially Stalin had plans for a "super museum" celebrating the Soviet victory, similar to Hitler's planned Führermuseum. Most cultural items seized by the Soviet state were concentrated in few institutions in major centers, such as Moscow and Leningrad (in particular, the Pushkin Museum in Moscow and the Hermitage Museum in Leningrad), with little compensation reaching cultural institutions in provincial areas. Exhibitions of trophy art were prepared, but never opened to general public, accessible only to high-ranking Soviet officials. Shortly afterwards, Stalin ordered such collections to be considered top secret, which has been understood as an attempt to hide the scope of Soviet looting from the international public opinion. Since then, the USSR and subsequently Russia have generally denied that they held significant seized trophy art.

Soviet authorities have been described as very tolerant towards the theft of enemy property, although there were cases of more or less official taxation, extending into bribery, as well as resulting in arrests, including for soldiers who were considered too ambitious and greedy. Theft from trains and warehouses carrying loot, including reparations, became a serious problem for several years. Some crimes were committed by armed gangs; others involved corrupted officials illegally seizing and reselling goods. In some cases, corrupted officials would steal from veterans and their families, including the seizing of decorations and documents, that gave them access to privileges. To address the issues, particularly the theft of state property, a number of new laws were passed, particularly in 1947. Around that time, Stalin has used the argument about misuse of war trophies in a number of cases, reining in the power of the military; one of the most high-profile victims of this accusation was Marshal Georgy Zhukov (the Trophy Case).

=== Post-1991 revelations ===
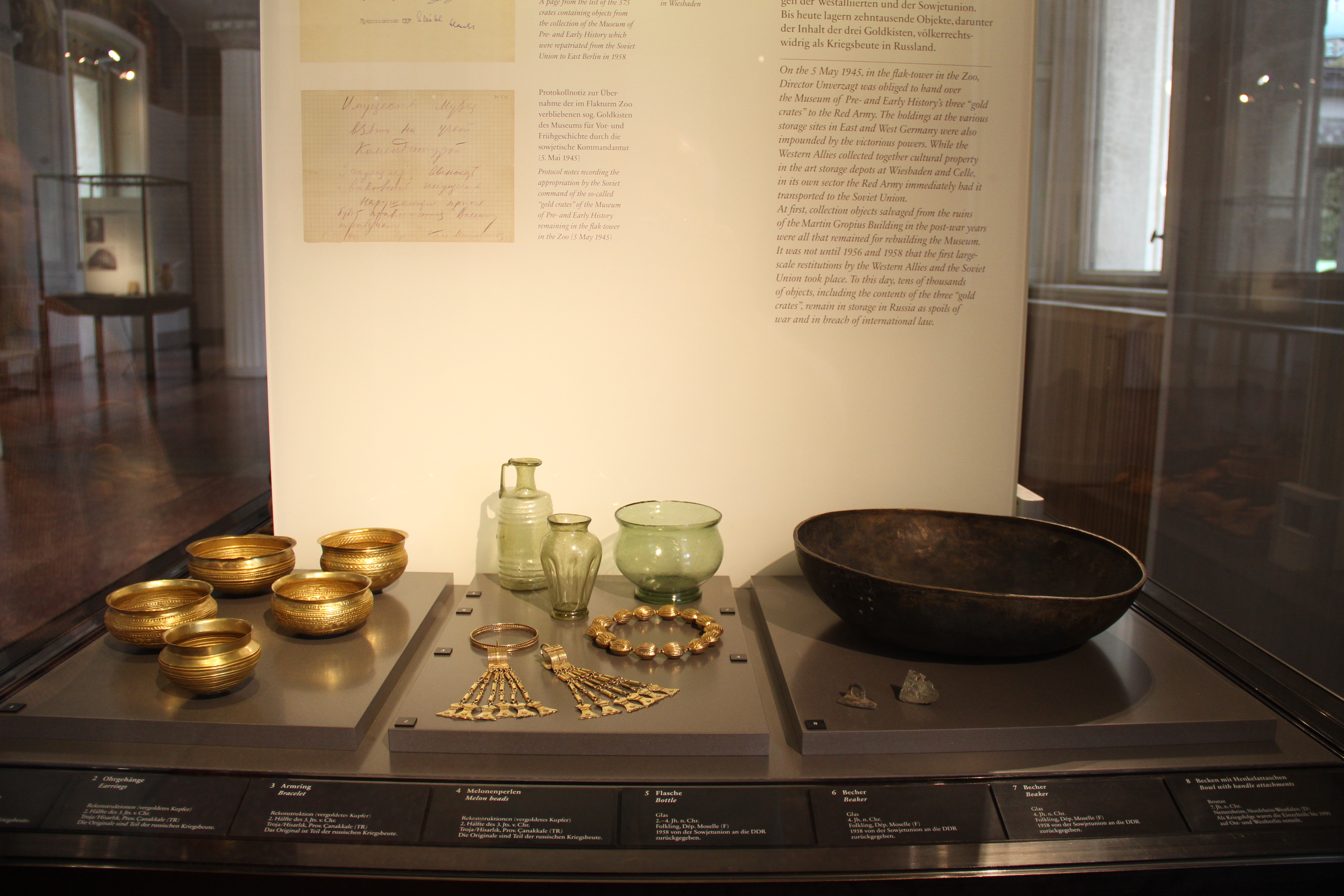
Copies of artifacts looted by the Soviets during World War II in a German museum.

The scope of Soviet looting came to light in the early 1990s, with revelations about the Soviet trophy brigades and stockpiles of looted art from World War II still lingering in hidden warehouses. The initial revelations came from Russian art historians Konstantin Akinsha and Grigory Kozlov, who published their findings in the American ARTnews magazine. They were covered by major media outlets worldwide, leading to public discussion such as the symposium on The Spoils of War. One of the notable early works on this was the 1994 book Loot: The Secrets of German Reparations (Добыча: тайны германских репараций) by Russian military historian Pavel Knyshevsky (Павел Николаевич Кнышевский).

In Russia, following a slight thaw in relations with the West after the collapse of the Soviet Union, international pressure by public option led to some early restitutions. Growing opposition from nationalists in the Russian Duma, however, led to a law halting further cultural restitution. Subsequently, the legality of Soviet removal of cultural objects from Germany has been addressed by the 1998 Russian cultural property law, which broadly justifies the Soviet actions, affirms the legality of de facto nationalization of World War II-era "trophies", and continued the Soviet trend of denying most compensation claims. Additionally, information about Western Allies' restitution of Soviet property to the USSR has been suppressed in the Soviet Union and is still mostly unknown or denied in Russia, with incorrect claims persisting in modern Russian media that much of the Soviet cultural artifacts looted by the Germans remains in the West. (Instead, much of these were returned shortly after the war through the Monuments, Fine Arts, and Archives program). The combined value of Soviet loot has been estimated at many billions of dollars.

== In conflicts after World War II ==
Soviet forces have been reporting as looting in the Cold War-era conflicts that followed World War II, such as in the Soviet–Afghan War. Likewise, Russian forces have engaged in similar behavior in conflicts following the fall of the USSR (for example, during the Russian invasion of Ukraine).

== Controversies ==
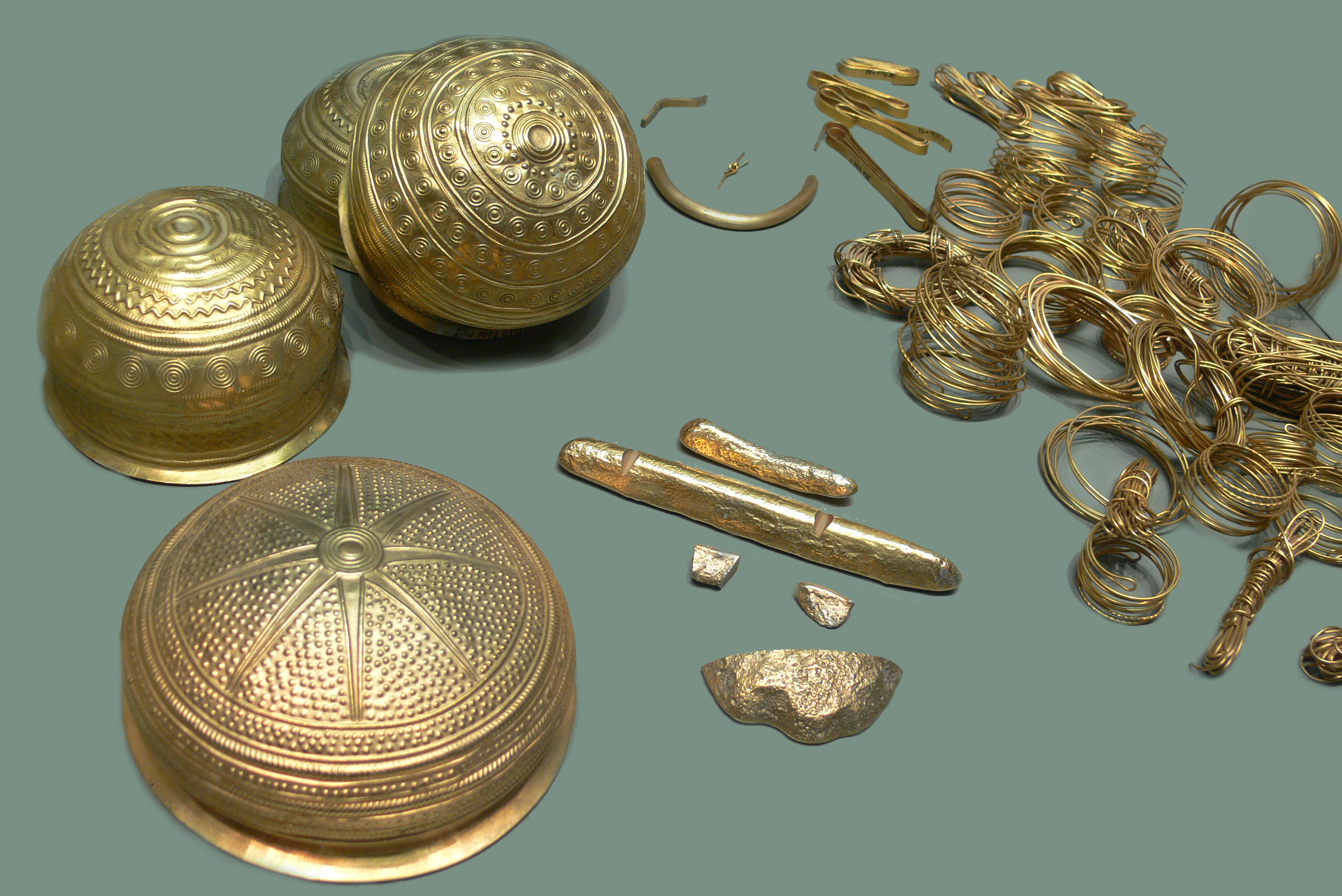
The Eberswalde Hoard (replica pictured) from Germany disappeared in 1945 from Berlin and was located in 2004 in a secret depot within Moscow's Pushkin Museum.

The Soviet actions violated the Hague Convention of 1907, which forbids the seizure of cultural property during wartime.

According to Akinsha, Soviet actions resulted in "the complete destruction of the museums of East Germany and western Poland". Akinsha also noted that "losses of Soviet museums were of moderate quality", as Germans never reached and thus were unable to plunder the largest Soviet collections, and many others were evacuated east before Germans seized them. This would make the Soviet seizure of German property disproportional to the losses incurred. Soviets seized so many items that those of mostly local interest and low value have been even described as becoming "a burden to Soviet cultural institutions". Others have remained in secret warehouses, and were never shown to public. Some have never been catalogued to this day; some perishable ones, like written documents or delicate objects, have perished during transportation or through improper storage.

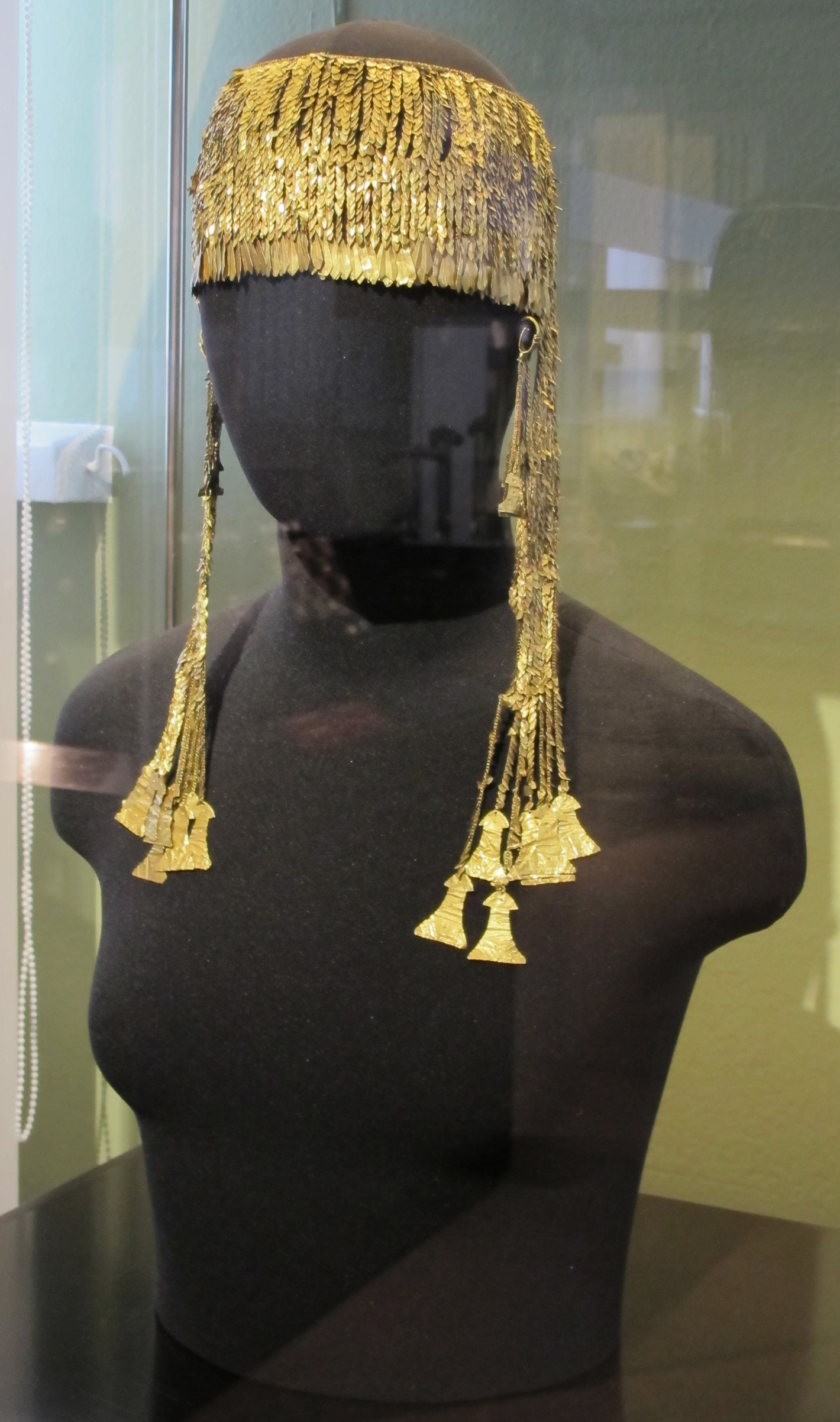
The "big" diadem of Priam's Treasure in an exhibition at Pushkin Museum in 2011

Some of the items seized by the Soviets and subsequently transferred to the USSR included those formerly belonging to state institutions or collectors from European countries looted by Germans during the war (ex. from the Polish National Museum in Poznań), including from Jewish victims of the Holocaust; the Soviet Union (and later, Russia) have steadily refused to return the items to such parties or otherwise compensate them. Exceptions included some collections of state museums returned to Soviet satellite states in the De-Stalinization period, aiming at appeasing them and following events such as the Hungarian Revolution of 1956. Nonetheless, even such exceptional restitutions to the Soviet satellite states have been described as minimal, and any restitutions to private collectors or other countries have been seen as even more marginal. The relatively rare more recent returns concerned less valuable items such as archives, and have been accompanied with requests for payment of "storage fees" and "equivalent return" of Russian artifacts held by the receiving countries. Examples of major cultural artifacts that remain in Russian possession, looted during World War II, include Priam's Treasure, the Baldin Collection and the Eberswalde Hoard.

The return of items to countries, even those outside the Axis Powers, remains deeply unpopular with the Russian populace. In 2005, a Russian official in a cultural heritage agency said "Everything that the Soviet Union took as compensation... is not subject to return". This has been explained by the "manipulation of historical memory" by the Soviet and Russian governments, which steadily reinforces the image of the "trophies" as just compensation for the cultural losses suffered by Russia (even though the majority of such losses occurred in territories of modern Ukraine). Return of the artworks is an anathema to Russian nationalists, who believe that any such action signifies weakness on the part of Russia, while on the contrary, keeping them proves that Russia is a great power that does not bow down to the West.

== In popular culture ==
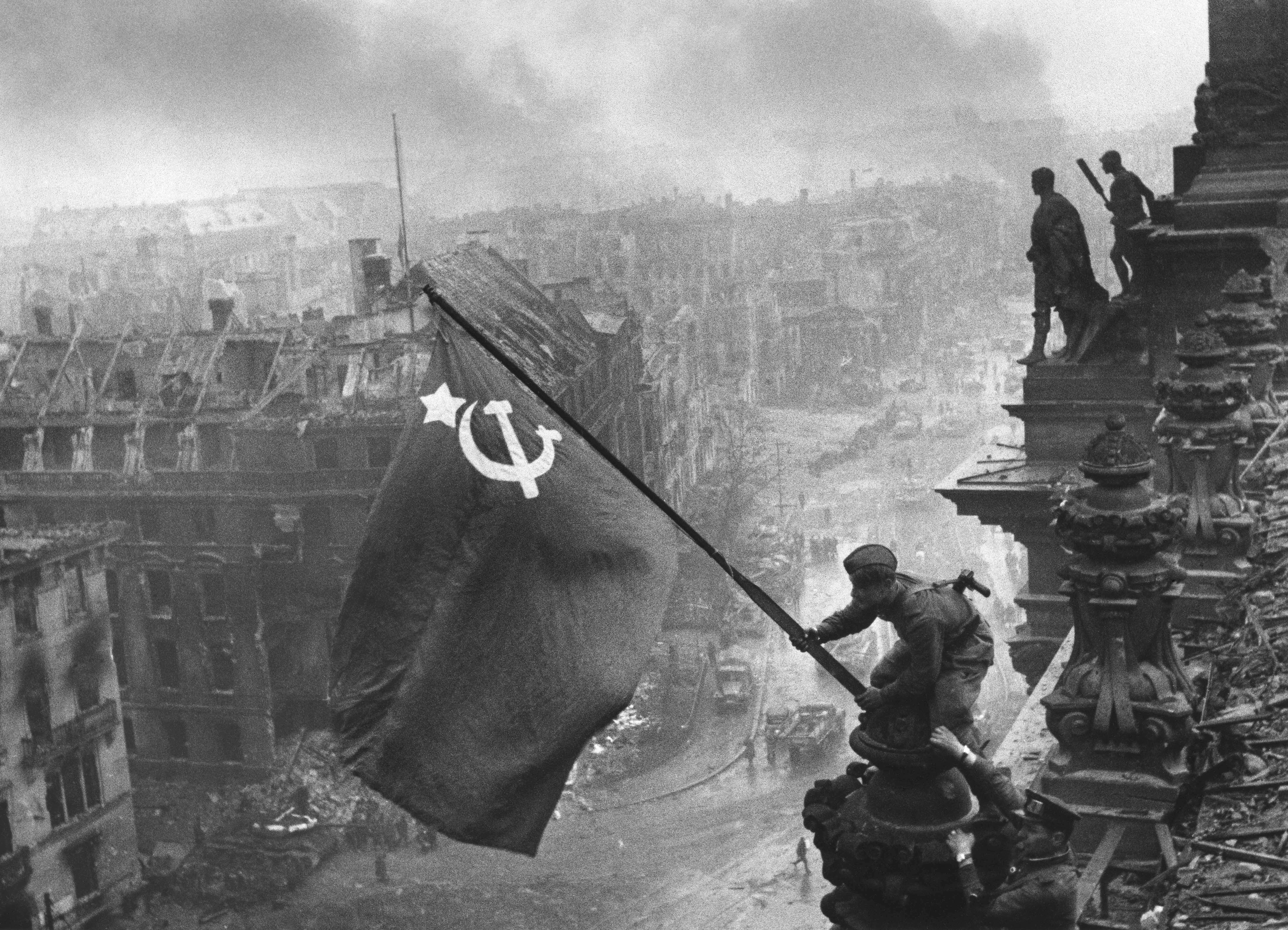

The original photo of Raising a Flag over the Reichstag (top) was altered (bottom) by editing the second watch on Ismailov's right wrist, which was considered an embarrassing evidence he engaged in looting.

Widespread Soviet looting led to a Central and Eastern Europe stereotype of the Soviet soldier as a looter "with many wristwatches". An iconic photo from the end of the war, Raising a Flag over the Reichstag, which became a symbol of the Soviet victory over Nazi Germany, captured Senior Sergeant Abdulkhakim Ismailov, who was supporting the flag-bearer, apparently wearing two watches, which could imply he had looted one of them. To cover that embarrassing detail, the photo was edited.

The plundering was also a subject of literary works. A Russian writer and former Red Army officer during World War II, Aleksandr Solzhenitsyn, wrote a long poem describing the Red Army's march across East Prussia, Prussian Nights, a passage of which describes the looting:

The conquerors of Europe swarm,
Russians scurrying everywhere... In their trucks they stuff their loot:
Vacuum cleaners, wine, and candles,
Skirts, and picture frames, and pipes,
Brooches, and medallions, blouses, buckles,
Typewriters (not with Russian type),
Rings of sausages and cheeses, small domestic ware and veils,
Combs, and forks, and wineglasses,
Samplers, and shoes, and scales...

— Aleksandr Solzhenitsyn, Prussian Nights

== Historiography ==
In historiography, the topic of Soviet looting has been considered understudied. Some key documents, including decrees issued by Joseph Stalin in 1945 for the Soviet removal of cultural property from territories occupied by the Soviet Army, have still been classified and not disclosed to historians as of the mid-2010s. Others are assumed to have already been destroyed, to prevent embarrassment or hinder investigations into Soviet crimes.

== See also ==
- Looting of Poland in World War II#The Soviet Union
- Looted art#Looting by the Soviet Union
- Nazi plunder
- Looting by Russian forces during the Russian invasion of Ukraine
- Art theft and looting by Russia during the invasion of Ukraine
- World War II reparations#Soviet Union
- Monuments, Fine Arts, and Archives program
