= Kurunzulay =

Kurunzulay Курунзулай
- Selo
- Location within Zabaykalsky Krai Location within Russia
- Coordinates: 50°56′N 117°07′E
- Country: Russia
- Region: Zabaykalsky Krai
- District: Borzinsky District
- Time zone: UTC+9:00

Kurunzulay (Russian: Курунзулай) is a rural locality (a selo) in Borzinsky District, Zabaykalsky Krai, Russia. Population: 240 (2021 census); 341 (2010 census); 494 (2002 census); There are 7 streets in this selo.

== Geography ==
This rural locality is located 74 km from Borzya (the district's administrative centre), 282 km from Chita (capital of Zabaykalsky Krai) and 5,597 km from Moscow. Oldonda is the nearest rural locality.
