= Borzya-2 (air base) =

Airport in Zabaykalsky Krai, Russia

Borzya-2
- Borzya, Zabaykalsky Krai in Russia
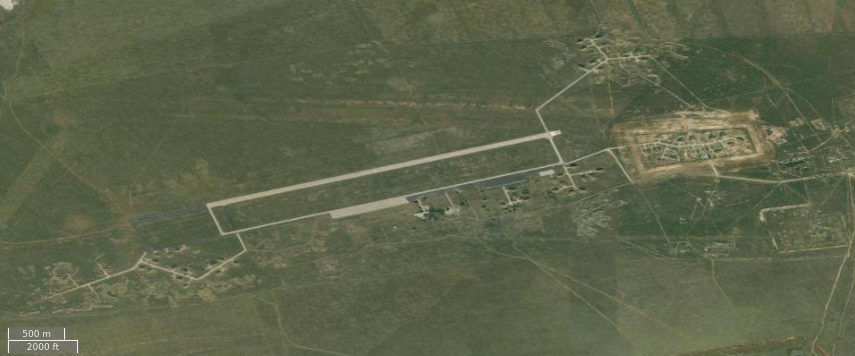
- Satellite imagery of Borzya-2 air base

Site information
- Type: Air Base
- Owner: Ministry of Defence
- Operator: Russian Air Force

Location
- Shown within Zabaykalsky Krai Borzya-2 (Russia)
- Coordinates: 50°23′48″N 116°20′48″E

Site history
- In use: -present

Airfield information
- Identifiers: ICAO: XIAG
- Elevation: 671 metres (2,201 ft) AMSL
Runways
Direction	Length and surface
08/26	2,500 metres (8,202 ft) Concrete

Borzya-2 (also referred to as Borzia, Borzyu, and Borzya Northwest) is an air base in Zabaykalsky Krai, Russia located 13 km west of Borzya. It is a simple fighter base with three areas of fighter revetments housing about 30 aircraft. The dispersal field for this airbase was Arabatuk, located 30 km away from Borzya.

From 1945 to mid-1961 the 189th Guards Fighter-Bomber Aviation Regiment (189 Gv APIB) (though a Shrumovik regiment 1945-56) had been stationed at various airfields in Poland. In July 1961 (possibly only in 1969) it was relocated from Brzeg (probably pl:Lotnisko_Brzeg-Skarbimierz) to Borzya-2. It was equipped with the Mikoyan MiG-17 at the time. When it arrived in Transbaikalia it came under the control of the 23rd Air Army It was reequipped with the Sukhoi Su-17M and then the Sukhoi Su-17M3 in 1975 and 1985. It was disbanded in 1998.

In 1975 the 101st Independent Reconnaissance Aviation Regiment (101 ORAP) was establiushed at Borzya-2 flying MiG-21Rs. Later it flew the Sukhoi Su-17M3R aircraft.

== See also ==
- List of military airbases in Russia
