= Art theft and looting by Russia during the invasion of Ukraine =

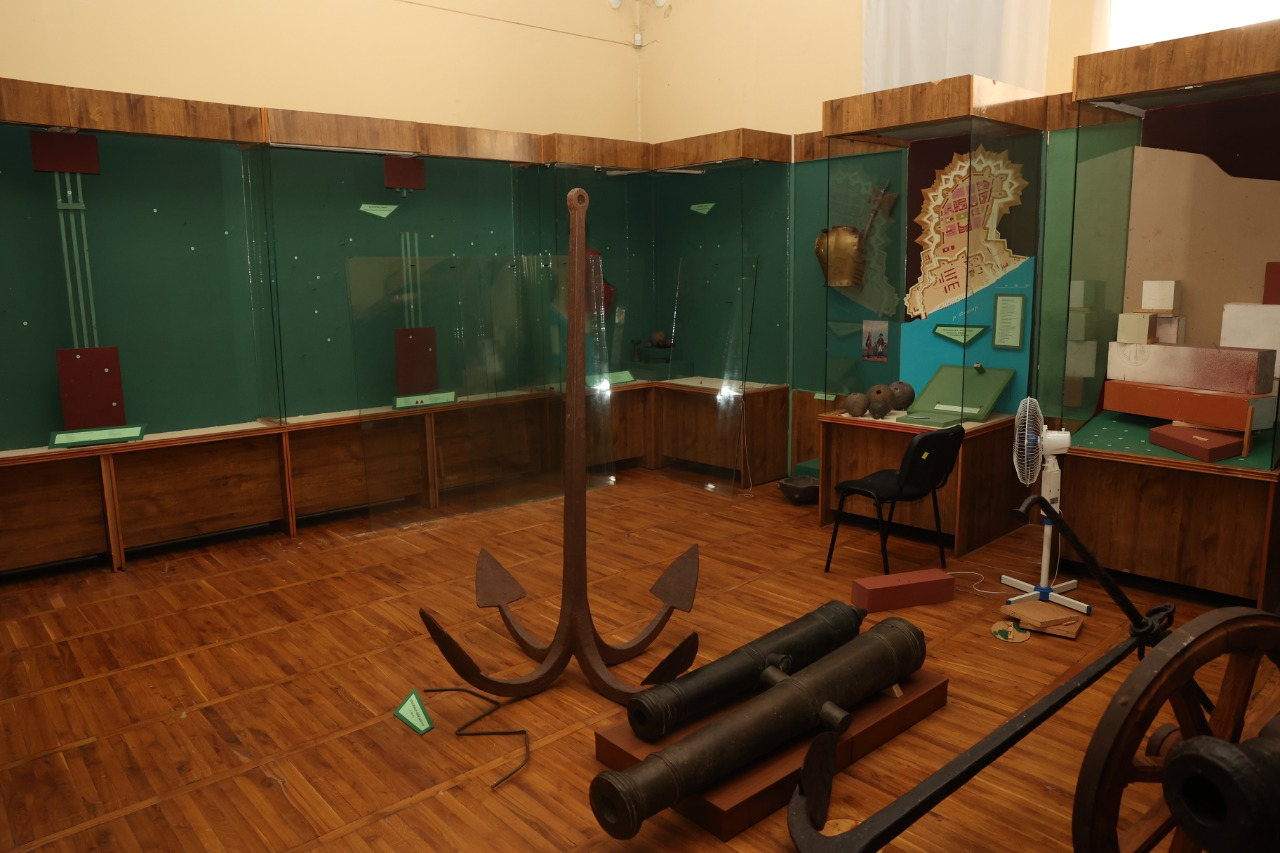
Aftermath of looting by Russian occupying troops at the Kherson Local History Museum in 2022

Since the 2022 Russian invasion of Ukraine, Russian forces and organizations have stolen and looted tens of thousands of art pieces from Ukraine, ranging from modern art to ancient Scythian gold. The Russians have also destroyed hundreds of cultural sites and monuments. The looting has been organized, with, in some cases, Russian art experts participating in the theft, and directing Russian soldiers as to which pieces to steal. In Mariupol alone, Russians stole over 2,000 works of art from the city's three main museums, after Russian forces occupied the city after a three-month siege in May 2022. In the Kherson region, shortly before fleeing the area to the north of the Dnieper river Russians destroyed, either fully or in part, over 200 Ukrainian cultural sites and stole around 10,000 art pieces from the city's museums, out of a collection of 13,000. Other sources put the number of stolen art works from Kherson alone at 15,000.

In occupied Melitopol, Russian troops stole a 4th-century golden helmet dating to the Scythian kingdom, worth millions of dollars. Russian soldiers attempted to force the local museum director to reveal the location of other Scythian gold artifact which she had hidden shortly before Russian army occupied the city. They threatened her at gunpoint and abducted her when she refused to cooperate. She was interrogated but ultimately allowed to leave Russian-held territory.

The looting by Russia has been compared to the Nazi plunder carried out by Nazi Germany as well as the subsequent Soviet plunder and has been called "the single biggest collective art heist since the Nazis pillaged Europe in World War II".

In February 2026, Interpol published an online database detailing the artifacts stolen from Ukrainian museums. The records were compiled by the National Police of Ukraine.

== See also ==
- 2022 Russian theft of Ukrainian grain
- Art theft and looting during World War II
- Napoleonic looting of art
- Sacking by Russian forces during the 2022 Russian invasion of Ukraine
- Soviet plunder
- Ukrainian cultural heritage during the 2022 Russian invasion
