= Arabatuk (air base) =

Airport in Zabaykalsky Krai, Russia

Arabatuk
- Borzya, Zabaykalsky Krai in Russia
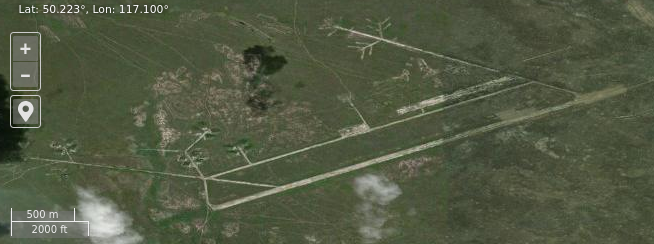
- Satellite imagery of Arabatuk air base

Site information
- Type: Air Base
- Owner: Ministry of Defence
- Operator: Russian Air Force

Location
- Shown within Zabaykalsky Krai Arabatuk (Russia)
- Coordinates: 50°13′23″N 117°06′00″E

Site history
- In use: -present

Airfield information
- Identifiers: ICAO: ZA2N
- Elevation: 695 metres (2,280 ft) AMSL
Runways
Direction	Length and surface
00/00	2,500 metres (8,202 ft) Concrete

Arabatuk (also given as Krasnyy Velikan North) is an air base in eastern Russia. It is located 38 km northeast of Dauriya, Zabaykalsky Krai and 28 miles (45 km) south east of Borzya. It was a dispersal airfield for 189th Guards Brestskiy order of Suvorov Fighter-Bomber Aviation Regiment (Borzya-2). During normal operations it remained idle (in caretaker status) (avia.ru forum http://www.avia.ru/forum).

== See also ==
- List of military airbases in Russia
