= Soviet War Trophy case =

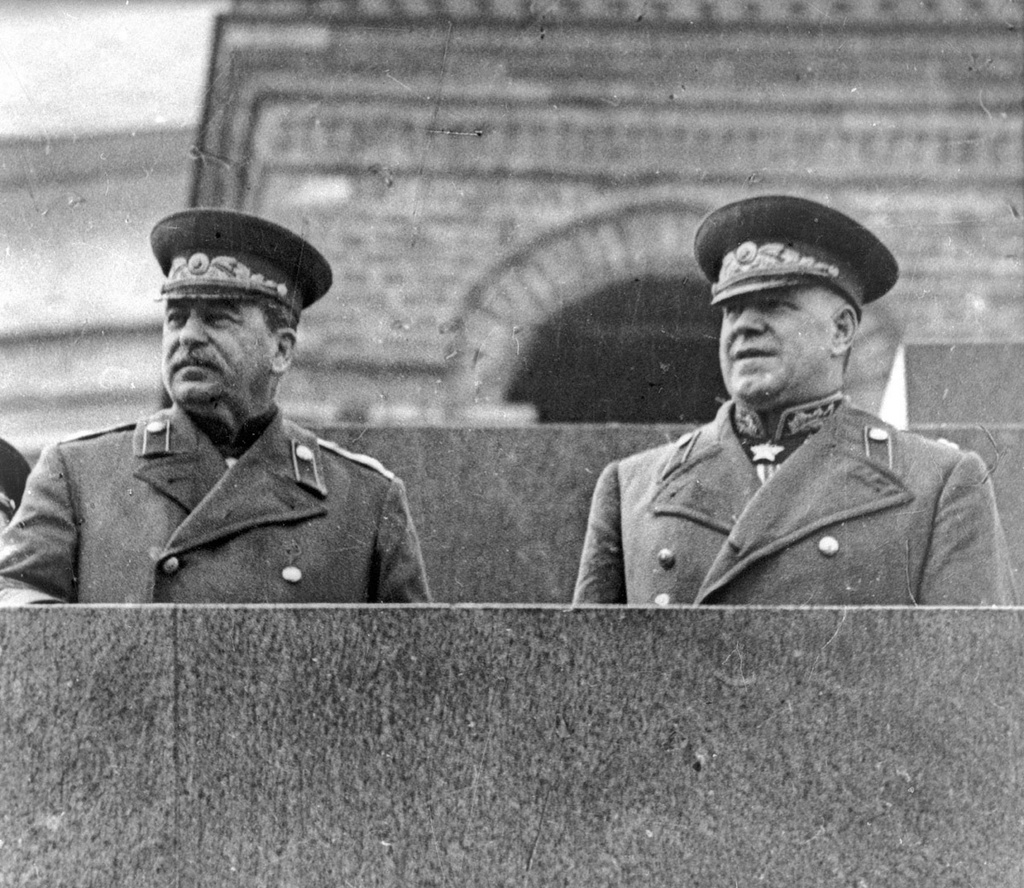
- On the Victory Parade on June 24, 1945 (Russian: ), Soviet leader Joseph Vissarionovich Stalin (left) and the Supreme Deputy Commander of the Soviet Armed Forces Georgy Konstantinovich Zhukov (right) were present.
- Original Name: Трофейное дело
- Date: 1946—1948
- Place: the Soviet Union
- Type: Anti-corruption (the official reason of the Soviet Union) Political persecution (as claimed by some historians)
- Motive: Cracking down on the abuse of power by military commanders (the official reason of the Soviet Union) Suppressing Georgy Zhukov (some historians hold this view)

The Soviet War Trophy case, or Prize Case (Note: The title is taken from People's Daily Online"女兒憶朱可夫：晚年淒涼 遭遇兩次免職風波". culture.people.com.cn. [Daughter remembers Zhukov: In his later years, he was in a state of desolation and suffered two instances of being removed from his position.])(Russian: Трофейное дело , also known as the General Case (Russian: Генеральское дело ) or the Zhukov Incident) was a law enforcement operation carried out by the Soviet Ministry of State Security from 1946 to 1948 under the instructions of Soviet leader Joseph Vissarionovich Stalin, A law enforcement operation organized by its minister, Viktor Semenovich Abakumov, targeting soldiers who were seizing the spoils of war. This case is one of the secret cases led by the Ministry of State Security after the war, and is rarely mentioned publicly.

After the Soviet Union launched its counteroffensive, the collection of enemy war spoils became increasingly institutionalized, while some generals were found to have illegally occupied the spoils. In November 1947, Abakumov informed Stalin about the abuse of power and seeking personal gain by the leadership of the Soviet military headquarters in Germany and the relevant personnel of the Ministry of Internal Affairs. Subsequently, a large number of officers involved were arrested. The Soviet authorities claimed that the purpose of this case was to expose the corrupt behavior of the generals, but some historians believe that the starting point of this movement was Stalin's attempt to crack down on Georgy Konstantinovich Zhukov, a highly respected general in the military. In the "Aviators Affair " (Note: It is also translated as "The Pilot Incident".), Abakumov subjected Air Marshal Alexander Alexandrovich Novikov to torture and interrogation, forcing him to provide evidence of Zhukov's attempt to stage a coup. However, at a meeting on June 1, 1946, Zhukov received the support of most of the attending generals, and Stalin failed to arrest him, but removed Zhukov's position as the Chief of the Army General Staff. The investigation then turned to the war spoils, not only seizing a train belonging to Zhukov carrying a large amount of furniture, but also discovering a large number of artworks and jewels from Germany in his private residence, as well as the arrest of many of Zhukov's close associates and military personnel, and obtaining testimony from them about his plundering of war spoils during the German occupation.

Three of the defendants were sentenced to death, while the others were sentenced to terms of 10 to 25 years of labor imprisonment. Zhukov was relieved of his position as the commander of the Odessa Military District . After Stalin's death in 1953, all of them were rehabilitated and released, but most of the confiscated property was not returned.Abakumov, who led this movement, was sentenced to death and executed on December 4, 1954.

== Background ==
=== Soviet military's loot system ===
During World War II, the Soviet army had strict regulations for the collection and management of spoils. Initially, the military spoils (mainly equipment and weapons) captured by the Soviet army were handled by the spoils task force under the command of the army group commander. However, as the Soviet army gradually launched a counteroffensive, they also began to capture enemy military warehouses, and the army group commander would use their materials and equipment to improve their own logistical situation In January 1943, the Defense Committee passed a resolution that from February, the spoils captured in battle should be handled in accordance with the regulations, and a special committee led by Marshal Semyon Mikhaylovich Budyonny was established to supervise In April of the same year, this committee was reorganized into the Spoils Committee under the Defense Committee, and Kremenchuk Evgenyevich Voroshilov Marshal was appointed as the chairperson From then on, the spoils business of the Red Army would be handled by the Spoils Committee, the Red Army Spoils Weapons and Equipment Bureau, the Army Group Spoils Weapons and Equipment Bureau, and the Unit Spoils Weapons and Equipment Department.

On December 26, 1944, the Ministry of Defense issued Order No. 0409, allowing soldiers with good performance to send parcels to their families every month. The weight regulations were as follows: ordinary soldiers and non-commissioned officers could send 5 kilograms, officers 10 kilograms, and senior officers 16 kilograms. Weapons, precious gems and metal products, antiques, and items symbolizing the Nazi regime were prohibited from being sent. Among them, the counter-espionage bureau responsible for supervision was relatively strict in inspecting ordinary soldiers, but rather perfunctory in inspecting officers. On June 23, 1945, the Resolution No. 9054-S of the Defense Committee stipulated that demobilized soldiers could receive free daily necessities from the spoils, and were allowed to purchase the spoils according to the standard in cash. On June 9, Resolution No. 90360 stipulated that each general could receive a war trophy car for free, while other officers could receive motorcycles and bicycles. In addition, they were also allowed to purchase war trophy furniture, carpets, musical instruments, tableware, furs, etc. in cash.

Meanwhile, looting within the Red Army was strictly prohibited and punished to maintain military discipline. In early 1945, over 1,500 soldiers were sentenced for looting charges. In September 1945, Viktor Semenovich Abakumov, the head of the Counterintelligence Bureau, signed Order No. 00170, requiring a thorough investigation of all properties under the Counterintelligence Bureau and stipulating that if any officials at all levels of the agency held unrecorded property, they would be sent to a military court for trial.

=== "Aviation case" and Zhukov ===
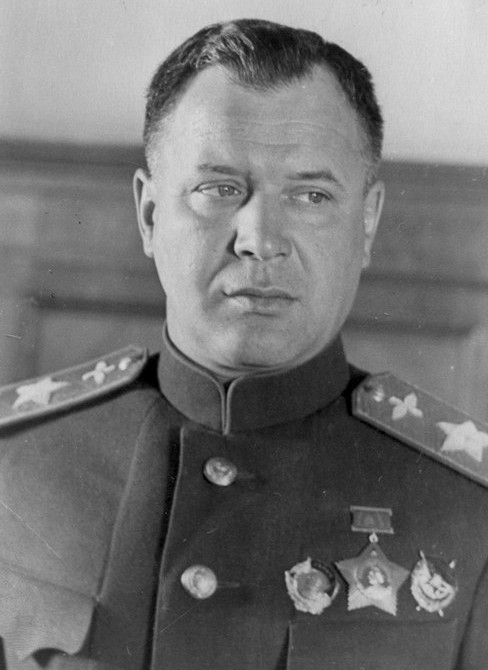
Marshal Alexander Alexandrovich Novikov, the commander-in-chief of the Soviet Air Force, was arrested in connection with the "aviation case (Russian:Авиационное дело)" and, under torture, was forced to provide charges that Zhukov had conspired to stage a coup

In the official account of the Soviet Union, the "Spoils of War Case" originated from the "investigation into the abuse of power by generals", but many historians believe it originated from the Soviet Union's top leader Joseph Visarionovich Stalin's hope to find testimony unfavorable to Marshal Georgi Konstantinovich Zhukov. Zhukov was the main military leader of the Soviet Union during World War II (officially known as the "Great Patriotic War" by the Soviet Union), holding the position of Supreme Deputy Commander. When Nazi Germany surrendered, he signed the Instrument of German surrender as the representative of the Soviet Union and served as the commander-in-chief of the Soviet Command in Germany. In March 1946, he was also appointed as the commander-in-chief of the Soviet Army.

The accusations against Zhukov began with the so-called "aviation case". Stalin's son, Vasily Iosifovich Stalin, wrote a letter to his father complaining about the overall poor quality of the Soviet Air Force, which was regarded as the main cause of this case. Zhukov was appointed as a member of the investigation committee in this case. On April 30, 1946, Marshal Alexander Alexandrovich Novikov, the commander of the Soviet Air Force, was accused of "disruptive activities" and arrested[1][3]. Then he was subjected to torture and interrogation by Abakumov, who was already the Minister of the State Security Department. Novikov was forced to admit receiving substandard military equipment and providing the accusations against Zhukov On June 1, 1946, Zhukov was summoned to a meeting of the Supreme Military Council. Zhukov's account of this meeting is as follows:

Stalin walked up to the secretary's desk, stopped for a moment, looked around, and then fixed his gaze on me. Then, he placed a document on the table and said in a deep voice, "Comrade Shchetymenko, please read these documents." …… It was the testimony of the commander of the Red Army Air Force, Novikov, who is currently being held in Beria's prison. There was also the testimony of my deputy, Semochkin. Explaining these accusations is of no significance. The core of this incident is quite clear: Marshal Zhukov was the mastermind behind the conspiracy, aiming to stage a coup. This incident involved 75 people. As of now, 74 have been arrested. …… I'm the last one on the list. I think the purpose of this meeting of the highest committee is to create an atmosphere that will catch me. …… After Novikov's confession was read out, there was an eerie silence in the hall. ……

Marinkov, Beria and Molotov began to have a discussion. These three men all wanted to involve me in their scheme, making others believe that I was a dangerous conspirator. They couldn't produce any evidence or facts; they were merely repeating the same old story about Novikov. After the talks among the members of the Political Bureau, Konev, Vasilevsky and Rozkossovsky made their speeches. They pointed out my shortcomings and some of the mistakes I had made. At the same time, they all declared that I could not be a conspirator. I think the words of the commander of the armored forces, Rebarko, left the deepest impression on Stalin. He said straightforwardly that the practice of "obtaining confessions through torture in prisons" should be stopped now. …… He concluded by saying: "Comrade Stalin! Comrades of the Politburo Committee! I do not believe that Marshal Zhukov is a conspirator. He has flaws, just like each of us. But he is also a patriot. During the battle of the Great Patriotic War, he proved this." Sta spoke. He was very calm. …… Obviously, at the beginning of the meeting, he had already planned to arrest me. However, due to sensing internal resistance, the military leaders did not agree. They united with me, and he had to... abandon his plan. After finishing his speech, Stalin walked towards me. I stood up. He placed his hand on my shoulder and said to me, "Comrade Zhukov, can you defend yourself?" I looked at him in astonishment: "Comrade Stalin, I have nothing to defend myself. I have been diligently serving my country. No matter what conspiracy it was, it had nothing to do with me. I request you to investigate how the testimonies of Novikov and Semochkin were obtained. I know them well and spent difficult times with them. I can guarantee that someone forced them to write these lies."

Stalin listened to me calmly, looking at me intently and said to me, "Anyway, Comrade Zhukov, you still need to leave Moscow for a while and travel around."

On June 3, Zhukov was relieved of his position as the Chief of the Soviet Army and was appointed as the Commander of the Odessa Military District.

Due to previous opposition from senior generals, the charges against Zhukov shifted towards spoils of war, and a relevant investigation was initiated on June 4. In a short period of time, the authorities collected evidence indicating that Zhukov had brought back a large quantity of furniture, tableware, weapons, artworks, jewelry and other types of spoils from Germany for personal use, which was consistent with the facts. On August 23, Nikolai Alexandrovich Burganin, the Minister of the Armed Forces of the Soviet Union, reported to Stalin that "seven carriages were intercepted at the Yagodino Customs (near Kovel), which contained 85 boxes of furniture. After document verification, these furniture belonged to Zhukov" . This accusation is also widely regarded as the beginning of the "Trophy Case". In November 1947, Abakumov informed Stalin that the leadership of the Soviet Command in Germany and relevant personnel from the Ministry of the Interior had abused their power for personal gain. At the beginning of December, Stalin reviewed Abakumov's report and other collected materials and immediately began the arrest operation.

== Arrest ==
Generals and officers closely related to Zhukov were subject to large-scale arrests and interrogations, including:

- General Ivan Alexandrovich Sherov, the deputy commander for civil affairs of the Soviet Military Administration in Germany, had a close relationship with Zhukov. Zhukov had previously served as the commander of the Special Military District of Kiev, while at the same time Sherov held the position of the People's Commissar of Internal Affairs of Ukraine. Even at that time, Sherov would occasionally give gifts and 50,000 German marks to Zhukov, as well as various other presents.
- General Vasily Nikolaevich Gordov, the commander of the Volga Military District, and his chief of staff, Lieutenant General Filipp Trofimovich Rebalichenko, expressed dissatisfaction during their conversation about Stalin's treatment of Zhukov. However, the conversation was recorded by the Ministry of State Security. Both were arrested on January 12, 1947.
- Singer Lyudmila Andreyevna Ruslanova was arrested on September 24, 1948, due to the fact that in August 1945, Zhukov had awarded her a military medal during her visit to Berlin.
- Vasily Grigorievich Zalizhcheev, a major general, was a special envoy of Zhukov and was arrested on November 1, 1947.
- General Konstantin Fedorovich Chelygin, a political officer who had served with Zhukov for a long time, was convicted for signing the commendation order awarding the medal to Ruslanova[14]. He was arrested on January 24, 1948.
- Colonel Leonid Fedorovich Minyuk, who served as adjutant and special military attaché to Zhukov during World War II.
- Vladimir Viktorovich Krykofov, a lieutenant general, was the husband of Ruslanova. He was arrested on September 18, 1948.
- General Grigory Ivanovich Kulik was arrested on January 12, 1947.
- Major General Alexei Matveievich Sidenev (Head of the Operations Department of the State Security Bureau of the Ministry of Internal Affairs in Berlin) was arrested in December 1947.
- Major General Grigory Akimovich Bezanno夫 (Deputy Chief of Operations at the State Security Department of the Interior Ministry of the State Security of Thuringia), was arrested in December 1947.
- Major General Sergei Alekseyevich Klyapov (Deputy Chief of Operations at the National Security Department of the State Security Committee of the Saxony Region), was arrested in December 1947.
- A. S. Semochkin (А. С. Семочкина), a former adjutant of Zhukov.

== Search ==
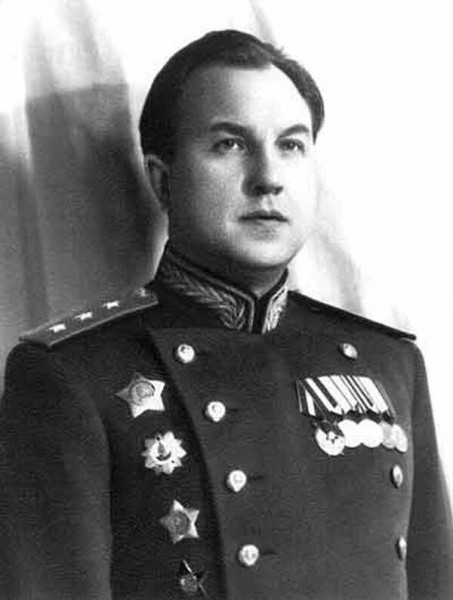
General Viktor Semenovich Abakumov, the Minister of State Security who led a team to arrest, search and interrogate Zhukov and his close aides, was the main executor of the "Trophy Case"

Zhukov's former deputy, Shemochkin, provided a large amount of testimony after the interrogation, claiming that Zhukov ostensibly respected Stalin but privately resenting him and attempting to downplay the latter's leadership position in the war. Additionally, Zhukov had plundered a large amount of property abroad (Note: There is a claim that these furniture were ordered by Zhukov himself at the factory and he obtained the official export permission from the Military Committee of the German Group, making them legal.: Lopez described in his book many accounts of Zhukov and his close associates engaging in plundering in Germany, pointing out that "Zhukov's behavior was no different from that of the soldiers", such as Sidenev once confessed to Abakumov that the senior commanders of the Soviet forces in Germany were not satisfied with stealing some watches and the like, but instead went to the safe of the German National Bank to plunder 100 bags of a total of 8 million imperial marks of currency, and then the head of the People's Commissariat for Internal Affairs in East Germany, who was also Zhukov's close associate, Shelyov, embezzled it. The head of the organization in Thuringia also re-produced beer in a local large tavern and kept the income for himself. Sidenev also said, "Zhukov sent me a crown, it is very likely that it is the crown of German Empress Catherine. Zhukov took the gold from the crown and decorated it on a riding whip, wanting to give it as a birthday gift to his daughter".), and was particularly obsessed with gold and valuable items. There are also a large number of gold jewelry brought from Germany hidden in two boxes and a suitcase in the bedroom.

On January 5, 1948, Stalin ordered a secret search of Zhukov's apartment in Moscow. Although no suitcase as claimed by Semochkin was found, a box was discovered; (Note: Later, after Zhukov and his wife returned to Moscow from Odessa, the suitcase was confirmed by the security department to have been carried by his wife all along.)from January 8 to 9 night, the search expanded to his villa in Rublyovo, where two rooms had been converted into storage rooms, containing a large number of valuable items. There were 12 gold watches alone. There were also a large number of expensive German furniture, carpets, furs, tapestries, bronze and porcelain vases, statues, paintings and silverware throughout the villa. In Abakumov's report to Stalin, he stated that what disgusted him the most was that "the entire atmosphere, from the furniture to the carpets, from the tableware to the curtains, was exotic, mainly German in style. There was not a single Soviet book in the room. Instead, we found many books bound in gold. All these books were in German editions. He thought he was in Germany, not in Moscow. " Later, Zhukov submitted a written explanation to Andrei Alexandrovich Dyannov, the head of the investigation committee, denying the accusations and claiming that most of the furniture in the villa was provided by Abakumov for his use (Note: Lopez believes that this action was very likely done to increase the charges against the already weakened Zhukov.). Then he admitted that he had "bought too many things in Germany", with 160 pieces of mink fur, 40 to 50 pieces of monkey fur, and 50 to 60 pieces of otter fur. Dyannov later gave Abakumov's testimony to Zhukov, and Zhukov replied on January 12, 1948, refuting and admitting his mistakes:

The accusation against me is that I was hostile towards Comrade Stalin, and that I belittled and dismissed his role during the Great Patriotic War. This is completely inconsistent with the facts. This was fabricated by Semochkin at random, and is exactly the same as Novikov's accusation against me. I admit that I made serious mistakes in terms of party discipline, and made others (my colleagues around me) aware of my views on Novikov's confession. I did this without much consideration and without targeting anyone. The accusation that I made anti-party remarks in front of the Allied forces in Frankfurt is completely inconsistent with the facts. Vichensky might be able to prove this, because he was with me at that time and also spoke. …… I request that the Central Committee of the Party take into account the certain mistakes I made during the war and that I have no ill intentions. I have been faithfully serving the Party, the country and Stalin. …… As a member of the Bolshevik Party, I swear to you that I will avoid making similar mistakes and foolish actions again. I request that you allow me to remain in the Party. I will correct the mistakes I have made and will never tarnish the title of a Bolshevik Party member.

On January 20, 1948, the Political Bureau listened to the committee's suggestions and issued a resolution condemning Zhukov:

As the leader of the Soviet occupation forces in Germany, Comrade Zhukov's mistakes tarnished his titles as a Party member and a commander of Soviet troops. Although Zhukov enjoyed all the supplies provided by the state, he still took advantage of his position to embezzle German property and transport it back to the Soviet Union for his own exclusive possession. He demonstrated how greedy he was and used his lackeys to commit crimes, stealing famous paintings and other precious items from private palaces and hotels, and forcibly breaking into the safes of jewelry in Łódź , and so on. Zhukov stole a total of 70 pieces of jewelry, 740 sets of silverware, 30 kilograms of various silverware, 50 precious Gobelins Manufactory tapestry, over 60 paintings of great artistic value, 3,700 meters of wool, silk, velvet, brocade and other materials, as well as 320 pieces of fur. The committee believes that Zhukov's behavior is no different from that of those who have political and moral blemishes. In view of all these circumstances, the Central Committee hereby issues the following: First, considering all these actions, it is entirely possible to expel Zhukov from the Party and hand him over to the court for trial. However, it is still decided to issue him a final warning and give him one last chance to reform and become a loyal Party member and an outstanding commander who does not disgrace his military rank. Second, transfer Zhukov from his position as the commander of the Odessa Military Region and assign him to work in the Small Military Region. Third, Comrade Zhukov must hand over all the property he illegally seized to the state.

On that day, Zhukov was relieved of his position as the commander of the Odessa Military District, and later, on February 4, he was ordered to be transferred to assume the position of the commander of the Urals Military District. In February, only a small portion of the property for which he could provide purchase vouchers was returned.

When the Ministry of the Interior conducted a search of the Jelikin family's residence, they discovered and confiscated 16 kilograms of silverware, approximately 250 pieces of wool and silk fabrics, 18 hunting guns, many valuable antique porcelain and pottery pieces, furs, 17th and 18th-century French and Flemish master tapestries, paintings and other expensive items. The property of the Krykov couple was also seized and confiscated, including two villas, three apartments, four cars, antique furniture, pianos, radios, unique tableware, and the collections of paintings by famous artists such as Ivan Konstantinovich Avazovskiy, Viktor Mikhailovich Vasenozov, and Ivan Ivanovich Shishkin. They also discovered the jewels belonging to Ruslanovna: 208 diamonds and a large number of emeralds, sapphires, rubies, pearls, platinum, gold and silverware. Ruslanovna stated during the interrogation that she purchased the paintings and the collection of jewels with her own money and pointed out that she was one of the highest-paid artists in the Soviet Union at that time. During the search of Major General Sidnev, the Ministry of the Interior discovered "a gold briefcase, 15 gold watches, 32 expensive fur products, 178 pieces of fur, 1500 meters of high-quality wool, silk, velvet fabric and other materials, 405 pairs of women's stockings, 78 pairs of shoes and 296 pieces of clothing".

During the investigation of this case, the Ministry of National Security subjected several generals and close associates of Zhukov to extensive torture in order to obtain confessions, in an attempt to portray them as individuals who had stolen state property and were politically unreliable. Chelygin later recounted the process of being tortured:

Over the course of a month, I was interrogated day and night by the interrogators and their assistants, which plunged me into utter despair... After they didn't obtain the desired testimony, I was sent to the Lefortovo Prison. That night, I was brutally beaten with rubber batons. From the room to the cell, two guards had to drag me along - I couldn't move. In the following week, I was brutally beaten by these two men in the interrogation room... I went crazy, couldn't walk, couldn't sit down, and wasn't allowed to lie down... My nervous system was pushed to the limit... My brain, heart and will were paralyzed... The torturers tore chunks of flesh off my body, damaged my spine and femur, and beat my legs. All of this plunged me into complete despair, made me indifferent to my fate, and left me with only one wish - to end it quickly, to die quickly, and let the torture end. I signed everything they wanted without control, only hoping not to be tortured or subjected to cruel punishments anymore.

Sidnev acknowledged in the interrogation record that he had stolen and misappropriated the spoils that should have belonged to the state in Germany, and mentioned that one of his operation teams had discovered over 40 million German marks at the German National Bank.

== Judgment and consequences ==
The defendant's verdict and sentence
Defendant	Judgment
Lieutenant General Kyukov	25 years in prison
Ruslanova	10 years in prison
Lieutenant General Tereykin	25 years in prison
Lieutenant General Terenyev	25 years in prison
Lieutenant General Minyuk	10 years in prison

Ultimately, Kulik (who was originally a general but was demoted to a lieutenant general), General Gorodov and Major General Rebalichenko were sentenced to death and executed by firing squad. The others were sentenced to long-term imprisonment in labor camps, with terms ranging from 10 years to 25 years. Although they were all arrested for the "spoils case", the charges they were convicted of had nothing to do with the spoils themselves, but rather political mistakes made during the war or statements made after the war.

Zhukov suffered the least damage, only being relieved of his military post, but his reputation among the Soviet people was severely damaged. In 1948 and 1949, many history books and artistic works about the Great Patriotic War in the Soviet Union removed Zhukov.

In 1953, Stalin passed away, and all the individuals involved were acquitted by the Military Court of the Supreme Court of the Soviet Union. Those who were imprisoned were released between 1952 and 1953. Zhukov was appointed as the First Deputy Minister of the Soviet Ministry of Defense in March 1953. However, most of the confiscated property was not returned. The only exceptions were that Ruslanova received some of her paintings back, while the rest of the property was compensated with 100,000 rubles (but according to her estimation, the value of the confiscated items alone, excluding jewelry, exceeded 2 million rubles).

On December 4, 1954, Abakumov and his five subordinates were accused of acts such as arbitrary arrest, the use of criminal investigation methods, the fabrication of evidence, and the concealment of complaints made by the defendant to the Central Committee. Despite being subjected to torture, Abakumov refused to confess. In his final statement, he said: "I myself did nothing. It was Stalin who gave the order, and I was merely the executor". Eventually, he was sentenced to death and executed in Leningrad on December 18 of the same year. In the 1990s, Abakumov's case was re-examined. First, on July 28, 1994, the crime was changed to "abuse of power" under Article 193-17b. Later, in 1997, Abakumov's sentence was changed to 25 years of hard labor in a labor camp with no confiscation of property.

== See also ==
- Lavrentiy Beria
- Aviators Affair
- The plundering of the Soviet Union
- The corruption of the Soviet Union

== Bibliography ==
- 谷岳飛. "女兒憶朱可夫：晚年淒涼 遭遇兩次免職風波". 人民網 (in Chinese).
- Roberts, G. (2015). 朱可夫 : 斯大林的将军 (in Chinese). Translated by 李晓江. 北京: 社会科学文献出版社. ISBN 9787509771679. OCLC 953259895.
- 让. 洛佩兹 (2015). 朱可夫 : 打敗希特勒的人 (in Chinese). Translated by 張竝. 上海: 上海文藝出版社. ISBN 9787532157457. OCLC 950446465.
- Мозохин, О. Б. (2022). "Компрометация маршала Георгия Константиновича Жукова". Известия Высших Учебных Заведений. Поволжский Регион. Гуманитарные Науки. (in Russian) (2): 57. doi:10.21685/2072-3024-2022-2-5.
- "04.06.46 – начало «Трофейного дела» — Всё о Второй мировой" (in Russian). 2025-06-04.
- "В СССР началось следствие по «Трофейному делу»". Календарь событий (in Russian).
- "Трофейное дело". Великая история России, история государства российского онлайн (in Russian). 2025-09-22.
- Леонов, Сергей (2020-02-07). "Секретные материалы 20 века". xfile.ru (in Russian).
- Румянцев, Вячеслав. "Телегин Константин Федорович". ХРОНОС (in Russian).
- "Biography of Lieutenant-General Leonid Fedorovich Miniuk - (Леонид Федорович Минюк) (1900 – 1977), Soviet Union". generals.dk.
- "Леонид Минюк". poisk.re (in Russian).
- "Гордов Василий Николаевич". Герои страны (in Russian).
- "Терентьев Василий Григорьевич (1899–1957)". Новодевичье кладбище и некрополь Новодевичьего монастыря (in Russian).
- "СМЕРШ. Взлет и падение Абакумова — Всё о Второй мировой" (in Russian). 2017-12-21.
