= United States restitution to the Soviet Union =

The United States restitution to the Soviet Union of the cultural treasures looted by Nazi Germany during World War II was part of the massive efforts of the Allies in returning cultural property to the countries of origin. While the Soviet Union embarked on the "compensatory restitution" by removing cultural artifacts from the museums and Nazi caches, US authorities in Germany returned more than half a million displaced cultural treasures and more than a quarter of a million books to the USSR, located in the US occupation zone. However the information about this was suppressed in the Soviet Union. It is still little known in modern Russia even at parliamentary level: in discussions of the laws about displaced cultural treasures a number of politicians stated that nothing was returned from Germany, and furthermore, state that the Nazi loot eventually went to the United States.
