= Sergei Troinitsky =

Russian museum director

Sergei Nikolaevich Troinitsky (1882–1946), was the first director of the Hermitage Museum in St Petersburg after the 1917 revolution.

In 1904, Troinitsky graduated from the Imperial School of Jurisprudence. In 1908, he began work at the Hermitage Museum as lead curator of the jewellery, porcelain and silver department. In 1917, he became the first director of the Hermitage Museum after the revolution.

Troinitsky was also an expert on heraldry, and published several books on the subject. From 1913 to 1914, he published the journal Gerboved (The Heraldry Master).

== Publications ==
- The Heraldry Book of Anisim Titovich Knyazev, 1785
- The Coats of Arms of the Company of Life Guards
- Senior and Junior Officers and Soldiers
- The Coats of Arms of the Commander and Officers of the Brig Mercury
