= Museum für Vor- und Frühgeschichte (Berlin) =

Archaeological museum in Berlin, Germany

Coordinates: 52°31′14″N 13°17′32″E

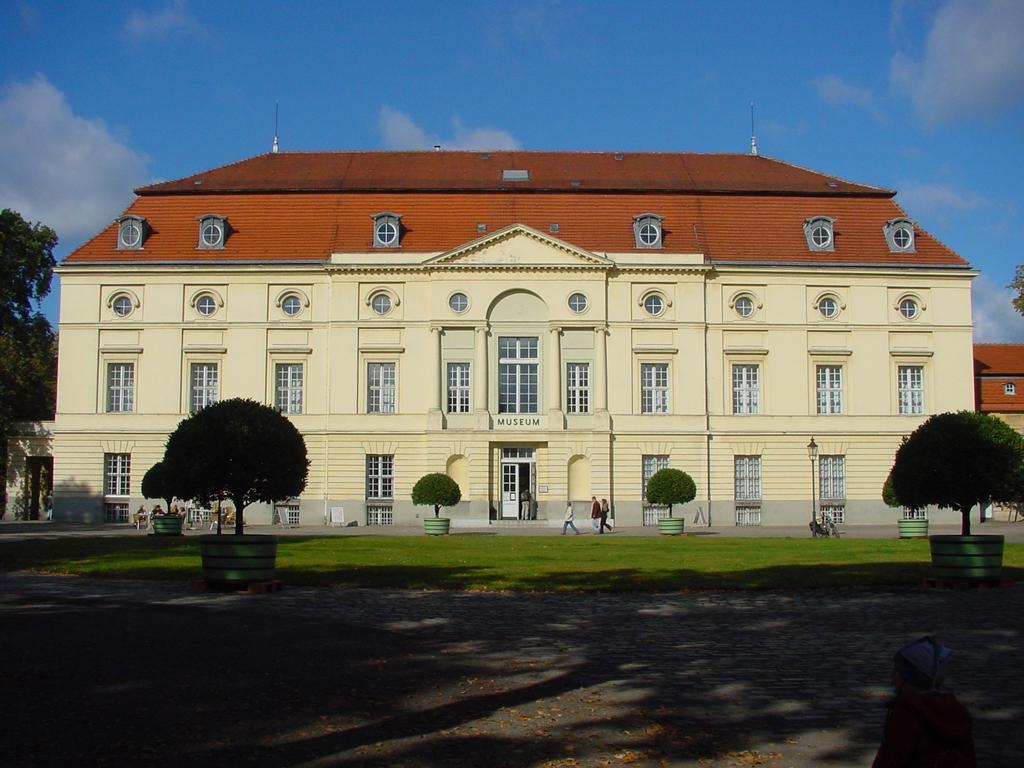
Former home of the Museum für Vor- und Frühgeschichte in Charlottenburg

The Museum für Vor- und Frühgeschichte ("Museum for prehistory and early history"), part of the Berlin State Museums, is one of major archaeological museums of Germany, and among the largest supra-regional collections of prehistoric finds in Europe. It was previously located in the former theatre building by Carl Ferdinand Langhans, next to Schloss Charlottenburg, and encompasses six exhibition halls on three floors. Since October 2009, the museum's exhibitions are now displayed in the Neues Museum on Museum Island.

Apart from a permanent exhibition, it regularly houses temporary exhibits. Attached to the museum is a specialised library on prehistoric archaeology with over 50,000 volumes. Furthermore, the museum houses the Commission for the exploration of archaeological collections and documents from northeast Central Europe, a project for the study of ancient Egyptian calendars, and a number of other bodies.

== History ==
The collection goes back to the Cabinet of curiosities and later art collection of the Hohenzollern who assembled an initial collection of ancient finds from 1830 onwards in Schloss Monbijou under the name "Museum Vaterländischer Altertümer" (Museum of National Antiquities). Later, the collection moved first to the Neues Museum, then, in 1886, to the Ethnographic Museum (Prinz-Albrecht-Strasse) and in 1921 into the Martin-Gropius-Bau, where it was renamed "Staatliches Museum für Vor- und Frühgeschichte" in 1931. The museum's financial supporters and contributors of material included Rudolf Virchow and Heinrich Schliemann.

After World War II, parts of the collections were confiscated by the Soviet Union.

The Museum moved to Schloss Charlottenburg (then West Berlin) in 1960. After German reunification, the collection of the East Berlin "Museum für Vor- und Frühgeschichte " was incorporated.

== Controversies ==
The acquisition of human skulls from colonial times in Africa by the museum and the research he commissioned into their origins attracted particular public attention.
