= Borzinsky District =

Borzinsky District Борзинский район (Russian)
- District
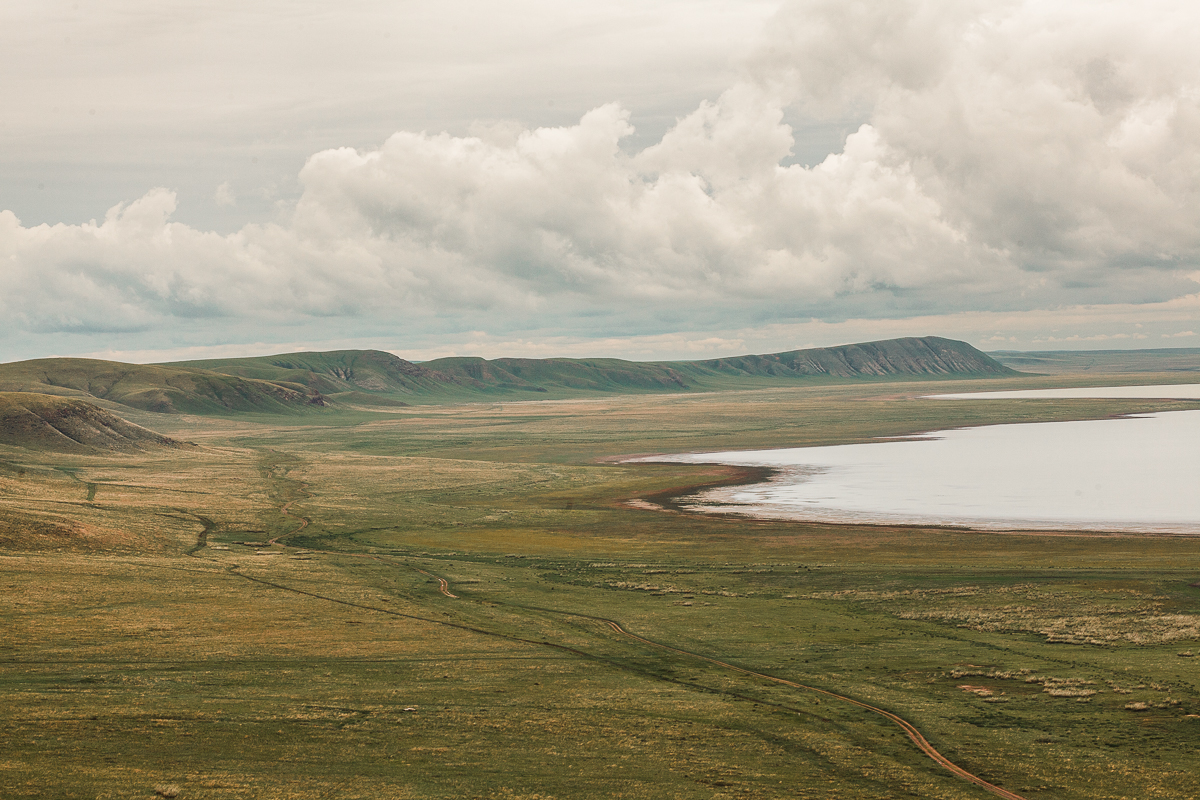
- Torey Lakes

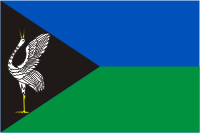
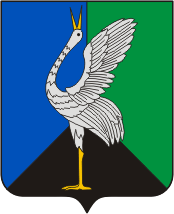
- Flag Coat of arms
- Location of Borzinsky District in Zabaykalsky Krai
- Coordinates: 50.491°N 116.864°E
- Country: Russia
- Federal subject: Zabaykalsky Krai
- Established: January 4, 1926
- Administrative center: Borzya

Area
  - Total: 9,000 km^{2} (3,500 sq mi)

Population (2010 Census)
  - Total: 51,647
  - Estimate (2018): 47,409 (−8.2%)
  - Density: 5.7/km^{2} (15/sq mi)
  - Urban: 84.9%
  - Rural: 15.1%

Administrative structure
  - Inhabited localities: 1 cities/towns, 1 urban-type settlements, 19 rural localities

Municipal structure
  - Municipally incorporated as: Borzinsky Municipal District
  - Municipal divisions: 2 urban settlements, 15 rural settlements
- Time zone: UTC+9 (MSK+6)
- OKTMO ID: 76609000
- Website: http://www.admin-borzya.ru/

Borzinsky District (Russian: Борзинский район) is an administrative and municipal district (raion), one of the thirty-one in Zabaykalsky Krai, Russia. It is located in the south of the krai, and borders with Olovyanninsky District in the north, Aleksandrovo-Zavodsky District in the east, Zabaykalsky District in the south, and with Ononsky District in the west. The area of the district is 9,000 square kilometers (3,500 sq mi). Its administrative center is the town of Borzya. Population: 51,647 (2010 census); 25,095 (2002 Census); 30,885 (1989 Soviet census). The population of Borzya accounts for 60.8% of the district's total population.

== History ==
The district was established on January 4, 1926.
