= Borzya =

Town in Zabaykalsky Krai, Russia

Borzya Борзя
- Town

Other transcription(s)
  - Buryat: Бооржо
  - Mongolian: Боорж
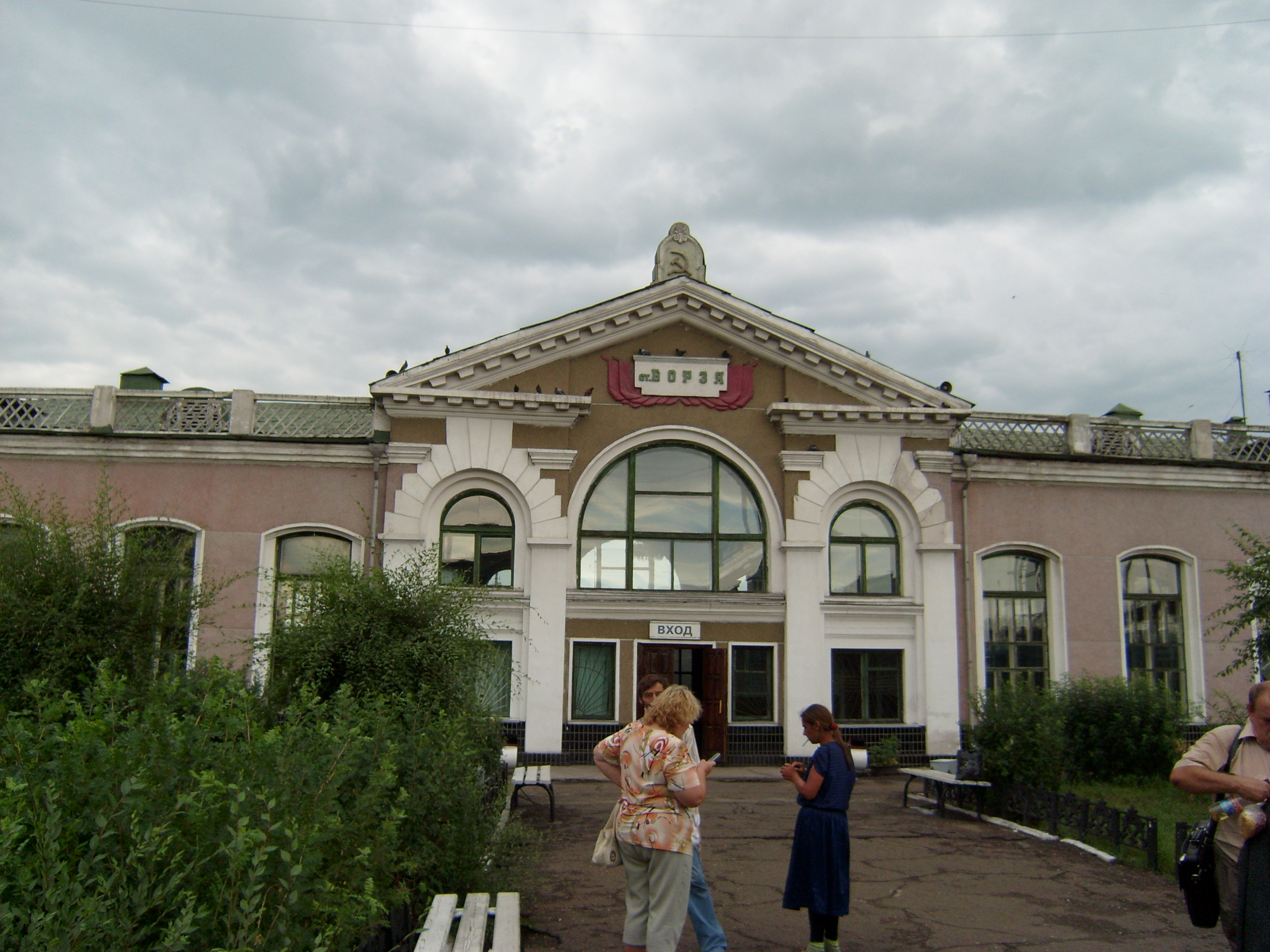
- Borzya railway station

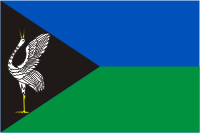
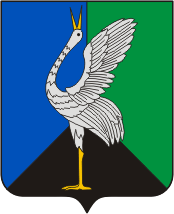
- Flag Coat of arms
- Interactive map of Borzya
- Location of Borzya Borzya (Zabaykalsky Krai)
- Coordinates: 50°23′N 116°31′E
- Country: Russia
- Federal subject: Zabaykalsky Krai
- Administrative district: Borzinsky District
- Founded: 18th century
- Town status since: 1950
- Elevation: 690 m (2,260 ft)

Population (2010 Census)
  - Total: 31,379
  - Estimate (January 2014): 29,822 (−5%)

Administrative status
  - Capital of: Borzinsky District

Municipal status
  - Municipal district: Borzinsky Municipal District
  - Urban settlement: Borzinskoye Urban Settlement
  - Capital of: Borzinsky Municipal District, Borzinskoye Urban Settlement
- Time zone: UTC+9 (MSK+6)
- Postal codes: 674600–674603, 674609
- Dialing code: +7 30233
- OKTMO ID: 76609101001

Borzya (Russian: Борзя, IPA: [ˈborzʲə]; Buryat: Бооржо, Boorjo; Mongolian: Боорж, Boorj) is a town and the administrative center of Borzinsky District in Zabaykalsky Krai, Russia, located 349 kilometers (217 mi) southeast of Chita, the administrative center of the krai. Population: 31,379 (2010 census); 31,460 (2002 census); 36,373 (1989 Soviet census).

== Geography ==
The town is located on the river Borzya—a right-hand tributary of the Onon—about 40 kilometers (25 mi) from the border with Mongolia in the south and 70 kilometers (43 mi) from the border with China in the southeast.

=== Climate ===
Borzya has a humid continental climate (Köppen climate classification Dwb) with severely cold, dry winters and warm, wet summers. Precipitation is quite low but is significantly higher from June to September than at other times of the year. Borzya is the sunniest city in Russia, the average annual number of hours of sunshine is 2797 hours, or about 63% of the time the sun is above the horizon,

Climate data for Borzya
Month	Jan	Feb	Mar	Apr	May	Jun	Jul	Aug	Sep	Oct	Nov	Dec	Year
Record high °C (°F)	0 (32)	7.1 (44.8)	20.8 (69.4)	30.1 (86.2)	37.2 (99.0)	41.4 (106.5)	40.3 (104.5)	37.6 (99.7)	34.4 (93.9)	25.8 (78.4)	12.4 (54.3)	4.4 (39.9)	41.4 (106.5)
Mean daily maximum °C (°F)	−17.8 (0.0)	−11.6 (11.1)	−1.6 (29.1)	9.9 (49.8)	18.5 (65.3)	24.8 (76.6)	26.5 (79.7)	24.1 (75.4)	17.6 (63.7)	7.6 (45.7)	−5.7 (21.7)	−15.8 (3.6)	6.4 (43.5)
Daily mean °C (°F)	−26.1 (−15.0)	−20.7 (−5.3)	−9.9 (14.2)	2.1 (35.8)	10.6 (51.1)	17.4 (63.3)	19.8 (67.6)	17.2 (63.0)	9.8 (49.6)	−0.1 (31.8)	−13.1 (8.4)	−23.4 (−10.1)	−1.4 (29.5)
Mean daily minimum °C (°F)	−32.8 (−27.0)	−28.8 (−19.8)	−18.3 (−0.9)	−5.8 (21.6)	2.2 (36.0)	9.4 (48.9)	13.1 (55.6)	10.5 (50.9)	2.6 (36.7)	−6.8 (19.8)	−19.5 (−3.1)	−29.9 (−21.8)	−8.7 (16.4)
Record low °C (°F)	−50 (−58)	−49.0 (−56.2)	−43.6 (−46.5)	−30.8 (−23.4)	−12.3 (9.9)	−4.5 (23.9)	1.2 (34.2)	−2.8 (27.0)	−13.8 (7.2)	−29.1 (−20.4)	−43.1 (−45.6)	−51.7 (−61.1)	−51.7 (−61.1)
Average precipitation mm (inches)	3 (0.1)	2 (0.1)	4 (0.2)	8 (0.3)	20 (0.8)	56 (2.2)	80 (3.1)	65 (2.6)	33 (1.3)	10 (0.4)	5 (0.2)	5 (0.2)	291 (11.5)
Average relative humidity (%)	75.3	78.6	73.7	46	39.1	42.9	46.4	50.7	52.1	58.1	74.1	76.5	59.5
Mean monthly sunshine hours	152	203	264	267	304	303	276	270	231	226	162	140	2,798
Source 1: Temps & Precip: pogodaiklimat.ru
Source 2: Other data: climatebase.ru (1948-2011)

== History ==
Although there had been human settlement on the present site of the town since the 18th century, the modern town began with the construction of the Trans-Siberian Railway in 1899. The settlement around the Borzya railway station was officially opened in 1900, named Suvorovsky in honor of Alexander Suvorov. This name, however, was not widely used by the residents, who continued to use the same name as the railway station and the river. The name Borzya was eventually made official when the settlement was granted town status in 1950.

== Administrative and municipal status ==
Within the framework of administrative divisions, Borzya serves as the administrative center of Borzinsky District, to which it is directly subordinated. As a municipal division, the town of Borzya, together with one rural locality (the crossing loop of Zun-Torey), is incorporated within Borzinsky Municipal District as Borzinskoye Urban Settlement.

== Economy ==
Besides the railway workshops, employers in the town include food production enterprised, particularly meat production from the livestock industry in the surrounding area.

The Kharanor brown coal open-pit mine is located northwest of the town, providing fuel for power generation.

=== Transportation ===
The town is on the original stretch of the Trans-Siberian Railway which crossed Manchuria on its way to Vladivostok and was known as the Chinese Eastern Railway. This route was later bypassed by the current Trans-Siberian, which is entirely on the Russian territory, but the original line passing through Borzya is still used for passenger and freight traffic to and from China.

A branch line from Borzya reaches Choibalsan in Mongolia. The border stations are Solov'yovsk (Соловьёвск) in Russia and Chuluunkhoroot (Ereentsav) in Mongolia. There are no passenger service across the border, but passenger trains operate between Choibalsan and Chuluunkhoroot.

== Military ==
The town was the headquarters of the 36th Army of the Russian Ground Forces until 2009.

The airbases of the Borzya-2 (air base) and Arabatuk (air base) are nearby.
