= List of rural localities in Zabaykalsky Krai =

Map of Russia with Zabaykalsky Krai highlighted

This is a list of rural localities in Zabaykalsky Krai. Zabaykalsky Krai (Russian: Забайкальский край, romanized: Zabaykalsky kray, IPA: [zəbɐjˈkalʲskʲɪj kraj], lit. Transbaikal krai) is a federal subject of Russia (a krai) that was created on March 1, 2008 as a result of a merger of Chita Oblast and Agin-Buryat Autonomous Okrug, after a referendum held on the issue on March 11, 2007. The administrative center of the krai is located in the city of Chita. As of the 2010 Census, the population was 1,107,107.

== Aginsky District ==
Rural localities in Aginsky District:

- Budulan
- Khoyto-Aga
- Kunkur
- Suduntuy
- Tsokto-Khangil
- Urda-Aga
- Yuzhny Argaley

== Akshinsky District ==
Rural localities in Akshinsky District:

- Aksha
- Bytev
- Kurulga
- Mogoytuy
- Narasun
- Novokazachinsk
- Novokurgatay
- Oroy
- Takecha
- Tokhtor
- Ubur-Tokhtor
- Ulacha
- Ureysk
- Ust-Ilya

== Alexandrovo-Zavodsky District ==
Rural localities in Alexandrovo-Zavodsky District:

- Alexandrovsky Zavod
- Bazanovo
- Bokhto
- Butuntay
- Chindagatay
- Kirillikha
- Klin
- Kokuy 1-y
- Kokuy 2-y
- Krasnoyarovo
- Kutugay
- Kuznetsovo
- Mankechur
- Mankovo
- Mulino
- Nikolayevka
- Novy Akatuy
- Onon-Borzya
- Savvo-Borzya
- Shara
- Sharakan
- Stary Akatuy
- Vasilyevsky Khutor
- Verkhny Alenuy
- Zhuravlyovo

== Baleysky District ==
Rural localities in Baleysky District:

- Aliya
- Baranovsk
- Bochkaryovo
- Bolshoye Kazakovo
- Butorino
- Grobovo
- Kazakovsky Promysel
- Kolobovo
- Matusovo
- Nizhneye Giryunino
- Nizhny Ildikan
- Nizhny Kokuy
- Novoivanovka
- Onokhovo
- Podoynitsyno
- Unda
- Undino-Polesye
- Urguchan
- Ust-Yagyo
- Verkhny Kokuy
- Yolkino
- Zhetkovo
- Zhidka
- Zhuravlyovo

== Borzinsky District ==
Rural localities in Borzinsky District:

- Akuray
- Biliktuy
- Chindant 2-y
- Khada-Bulak
- Klyuchevskoye
- Konduy
- Kurunzulay
- Oldonda
- Perednyaya Byrka
- Priozernoye
- Shonoktuy
- Soktuy
- Solovyovsk
- Tasyrkhoy
- Tsagan-Oluy
- Ust-Ozyornaya
- Yuzhnoye

== Chernyshevsky District ==
Rural localities in Chernyshevsky District:

- Aleur
- Bagulny
- Borodinsk
- Bukhta
- Bushuley
- Gaur
- Ikshitsa
- Kadaya
- Komsomolskoye
- Kovekta
- Kumakanda
- Kurlych
- Milgidun
- Nalgekan
- Novoilyinsk
- Novy Olov
- Ozyornaya
- Shiviya-Nadelyayevo
- Stary Olov
- Ukurey
- Utan
- Uley
- Ulyakan
- Uryum
- Zudyra

== Chitinsky District ==
Rural localities in Chitinsky District:

- Aleksandrovka
- Amodovo
- Arakhley
- Avdey
- Beklemishevo
- Beregovoy
- Burgen
- Chernovo
- Gongota
- Domna
- Domno-Klyuchi
- Ilyinka
- Ingoda
- Irgen
- Ivan-Ozero
- Kamenka
- Karpovka
- Khvoyny
- Kolochnoye 1-ye
- Kolochnoye 2-ye
- Leninsky
- Lesnoy Gorodok
- Makkaveyevo
- Mukhor-Konduy
- Novaya Kuka
- Novotroitsk
- Olenguy
- Podvolok
- Preobrazhenka
- Rucheyki
- Shaksha
- Shishkino
- Sivyakovo
- Smolenka
- Sokhondo
- Staraya Kuka
- Sypchegur
- Tankha
- Tasey
- Turgutuy
- Ugdan
- Verkh-Chita
- Verkh-Narym
- Yagodny
- Yelizavetino
- Yeryomino
- Zabaykalsky
- Zasopka
- Zhipkovshchina

== Duldurginsky District ==
Rural localities in Duldurginsky District:

- Alkhanay
- Ara-Ilya
- Balzino
- Bural
- Chindaley
- Duldurga
- Ilya
- Kharanor
- Krasnoyarovo
- Semiozyorye
- Stepnoy
- Taltanay
- Tokchin
- Uzon
- Zutkuley

== Gazimuro-Zavodsky District ==
Rural localities in Gazimuro-Zavodsky District:

- Batakan
- Budyumkan
- Bura
- Burukan
- Dogyo
- Gazimurskie Kavykuchi
- Gazimursky Zavod
- Igdocha
- Kaktolga
- Kaldaga
- Korabl
- Kungara
- Kurleya
- Kuryumdyukan
- Lugovskoye
- Novoshirokinsky
- Pavlovsk
- Shirokaya
- Solontsy
- Tayna
- Trubachyovo
- Ushmun
- Yamkun
- Zakamennaya
- Zeren

== Kalarsky District ==
Rural localities in Kalarsky District:

- Chara
- Chapo-Ologo
- Ikabya
- Kuanda
- Kyust-Kemda
- Nelyaty
- Sredny Kalar
- Udokan

== Kalgansky District ==
Rural localities in Kalgansky District:

- Bura
- Chingiltuy
- Dono
- Kadaya
- Kalga
- Kozlovo
- Nizhny Kalgukan
- Shiviya
- Srednyaya Borzya
- Verkhny Kalgukan
- Zapokrovsky

== Karymsky District ==
Rural localities in Karymsky District:

- Bolshaya Tura
- Kadakhta
- Kalanga
- Kaydalovo
- Kumakhta
- Mayaki
- Naryn-Talacha
- Novodoroninsk
- Poselye, Zabaykalsky Krai
- Srednyaya Talacha
- Tygertuy
- Urulga
- Verkhnyaya Talacha
- Zhimbira
- Zubkovshchina

== Khiloksky District ==
Rural localities in Khiloksky District:

- Alentuyka
- Arenur
- Bada
- Daygur
- Duty
- Engorok
- Glinka
- Gyrshelun
- Kharagun
- Khilogoson
- Khushenga
- Linyovo Ozero
- Mukhor-Shibirka
- Sarantuy
- Shilya
- Sosnovka
- Taydut
- Terepkhen
- Ukurik
- Ulyastuy
- Ushoty
- Zakulta
- Zhipkhegen
- Zurun

== Krasnochikoysky District ==
Rural localities in Krasnochikoysky District:

- Afonkino
- Albituy
- Alexandrovka
- Arkhangelskoye
- Atsa
- Barakhoyevo
- Baykhor
- Bolshakovo
- Bolshaya Rechka
- Bursomon
- Bykovo
- Cheremkhovo
- Fomichyovo
- Gremyacha
- Gutay
- Khilkotoy
- Konkino
- Korotkovo
- Koty
- Krasny Chikoy
- Krasnye Rechki
- Maloarkhangelsk
- Margintuy
- Menza
- Mostovka
- Nizhny Narym
- Osinovka
- Semiozyorye
- Shimbilik
- Shonuy
- Sredny Shergoldzhin
- Steklozavod
- Ukyr
- Urluk
- Ust-Urluk
- Ust-Yamarovka
- Verkhny Shergoldzhin
- Yadrikhino
- Yamarovka
- Zakharovo
- Zhindokon

== Krasnokamensky District ==
Rural localities in Krasnokamensky District:

- Aramogoytuy
- Bogdanovka
- Brusilovka
- Kaptsegaytuy
- Kaylastuy
- Kuytun
- Margutsek
- Soktuy-Milozan
- Tselinny
- Urulyunguy
- Yubileyny

== Kyrinsky District ==
Rural localities in Kyrinsky District:

- Altan
- Bilyutuy
- Bukukun
- Bylyra
- Gavan
- Khapcheranga
- Kyra
- Lubov
- Mangut
- Mikhaylo-Pavlovsk
- Mordoy
- Nadyozhny
- Nizhny Stan
- Tarbaldzhey
- Turgen
- Tyrin
- Ulkhun-Partiya
- Ustye
- Verkhny Stan
- Verkhny Ulkhun

== Mogochinsky District ==
Rural localities in Mogochinsky District:

- Anikino
- Arteushka
- Chaldonka
- Chasovaya
- Chichatka
- Dzhelonda
- Kendagiry
- Kisly Klyuch
- Kolokolny
- Kudecha
- Malokovali
- Nanagry
- Penkovaya
- Pokrovka
- Sbega
- Semiozyorny
- Taptugary
- Tyomnaya
- Zhanna

== Mogoytuysky District ==
Rural localities in Mogochinsky District:

- Aga
- Aga-Khangil
- Ara-Bulak
- Bilchirtuy
- Borzhigantay
- Bulak
- Buryatskaya
- Dogoy
- Khara-Shibir
- Nurinsk
- Ortuy
- Ostrechnaya
- Tsagan-Chelutay
- Tsagan-Ola
- Tsugol
- Ulan-Sarta
- Uronay
- Usharbay
- Zugalay
- Zunor

== Mogzon, Khiloksky District ==
Rural localities in Mogzon, Khiloksky District:

- Zagarino

== Nerchinsky District ==
Rural localities in Nerchinsky District:

- Aleur
- Andronnikovo
- Belomestnovo
- Beryozovo
- Bishigino
- Bolshoy Lug
- Ilim
- Kalinino
- Kangil
- Kotelnikovo
- Krupyanka
- Kulakovo
- Levye Kumaki
- Makeyevka
- Nagorny
- Nizhniye Klyuchi
- Olekan
- Olinsk
- Peshkovo
- Pravo-Peshkovo
- Pravye Kumaki
- Savvateyevo
- Sennaya
- Shivki
- Verkhniye Klyuchi
- Verkhny Umykay
- Volochayevka
- Zarechny
- Znamenka
- Zulzikan
- Zyulzya

== Nerchinsko-Zavodsky District ==
Rural localities in Nerchinsko-Zavodsky District:

- Argunsk
- Bayka
- Bolshoy Zerentuy
- Bulduruy 1-y
- Bulduruy 2-y
- Chalbuchi-Kilga
- Chashino-Ildikan
- Domasovo
- Georgiyevka
- Gorbunovka
- Gorny Zerentuy
- Ivanovka
- Ishaga
- Mikhaylovka
- Nerchinsky Zavod
- Serednyaya
- Shirokaya
- Solonechnaya
- Urovskiye Klyuchi
- Yavlenka
- Zolotonosha

== Olovyanninsky District ==
Rural localities in Olovyanninsky District:

- Antiya
- Arenda
- Bezrechnaya
- Bulum
- Burulyatuy
- Byrka
- Dolgokycha
- Karaksar
- Khara-Byrka
- Klyuchevaya
- Komkay
- Kulinda
- Mirnaya
- Ononsk
- Shiviya
- Step
- Topolyovka
- Turga
- Ulan-Tsatsyk
- Ulyatuy
- Verkhny Sharanay
- Yedineniye
- Zarya

== Ononsky District ==
Rural localities in Ononsky District:

- Bayn-Tsagan
- Bolshevik
- Buylesan
- Chindant 1-y
- Ikaral
- Krasnaya Imalka
- Kubukhay
- Kulusutay
- Kuranzha
- Nizhny Tsasuchey
- Novaya Zarya
- Novy Durulguy
- Stary Chindant
- Stary Durulguy
- Tut-Khaltuy
- Urta-Khargana
- Ust-Borzya
- Ust-Liska
- Verkhny Tsasuchey

== Petrovsk-Zabaykalsky District ==
Rural localities in Petrovsk-Zabaykalsky District:

- Alentuy
- Kandobayevo
- Katangar
- Katayevo
- Kharauz
- Khokhotuy
- Krasnaya Dolina
- Kukun
- Kuli
- Maleta
- Novaya Zardama
- Novonikolskoye
- Obor
- Orsuk
- Peski
- Sokhotoy
- Staraya Zardama
- Tolbaga
- Ust-Obor
- Zugmara

== Priargunsky District ==
Rural localities in Priargunsky District:

- Byrka
- Dosatuy
- Duroy
- Gorda
- Kuti
- Molodyozhny
- Novoivanovka
- Novotsurukhaytuy
- Norinsk
- Pogadayaevo
- Pogranichny
- Selinda
- Starotsurukhaytuy
- Talman-Borzya
- Ulan
- Urulyunguy
- Ust-Tasurkay
- Vereya
- Verkhny Tasurkay
- Zorgol

== Shelopuginsky District ==
Rural localities in Shelopuginsky District:

- Banshchikovo
- Bogdanovo
- Bolshoy Tontoy
- Chongul
- Daya
- Derevtsovo
- Glinyanka
- Ishikan
- Kopun
- Maly Tontoy
- Malyshevo
- Mironovo
- Nekrasovo
- Nizhnyaya Shakhtama
- Shiviya
- Sivachi
- Srednyaya Shakhtama
- Undinskiye Kavykuchi
- Verkh-Yagyo
- Verkhny Tergen
- Vershino-Shakhtaminsky

== Shilkinsky District ==
Rural localities in Shilkinsky District:

- Aprelkovo
- Baytsetuy
- Bereya
- Bogomyagkovo
- Chiron
- Galkino
- Kazanovo
- Kirocha
- Kokuy-Komogortsevo
- Krasnoyarovo
- Kyeken
- Makarovo
- Mirsanovo
- Mitrofanovo
- Nizhnyaya Khila
- Novoberezovskoye
- Nomokonovo
- Onon
- Ononskoye
- Ostrovki
- Savvino
- Shivanda
- Solntsevo
- Srednyaya Kiya
- Ulyanovka
- Unenker
- Ust-Aga
- Ust-Nozhovaya
- Ust-Telenguy
- Vasilyevka
- Verkhny Telenguy
- Verkhnyaya Khila
- Zubarevo

== Sretensky District ==
Rural localities in Sretensky District:

- Adom
- Aliya
- Argun
- Bayan
- Bolotovo
- Bolshiye Boty
- Bori
- Chalbuchi
- Chikichey
- Delyun
- Dunayevo
- Firsovo
- Gorbitsa
- Kudeya
- Kulan
- Lomy
- Luzhanki
- Mangiday
- Molodovsk
- Morgul
- Mygzha
- Nizhniye Kularki
- Nizhnyaya Kuenga
- Shemetovo
- Shilkinsky Zavod
- Starolonchakovo
- Uktycha
- Ust-Chyornaya
- Ust-Kurlych
- Ust-Nachin
- Ust-Narinzor
- Verkhniye Kularki
- Verkhnyaya Kuenga
- Yeralga

== Tungiro-Olyokminsky District ==
Rural localities in Tungiro-Olyokminsky District:

- Gulya
- Moklakan
- Tupik
- Srednyaya Olyokma
- Zarechnoye

== Tungokochensky District ==
Rural localities in Tungokochensky District:

- Akima
- Butikha
- Krasny Yar
- Kyker
- Nizhny Stan
- Sukhaytuy
- Svetly
- Tsagakshino
- Uldurga
- Ust-Karenga
- Usugli
- Verkh-Usugli
- Yumurchen
- Zelyonoye Ozero

== Ulyotovsky District ==
Rural localities in Ulyotovsky District:

- Ablatukan
- Ablatuysky Bor
- Arey
- Arta
- Balzoy
- Cheremkhovo
- Doroninskoye
- Golubichnaya
- Goreka
- Gorekatsan
- Deshulan
- Khadakta
- Krasnaya Rechka
- Leninsky
- Nikolayevskoye
- Novosaliya
- Novye Klyuchi
- Shebartuy 2-y
- Tanga
- Tataurovo
- Ulyoty

== Zabaykalsky District ==
Rural localities in Zabaykalsky District:

- Abagaytuy
- Arabatuk
- Dauriya
- Krasny Velikan

== See also ==
- Lists of rural localities in Russia
