= Kuryumdyukan =

Kuryumdyukan Курюмдюкан
- Selo
- Location within Zabaykalsky Krai Location within Russia
- Coordinates: 51°48′N 118°28′E
- Country: Russia
- Region: Zabaykalsky Krai
- District: Gazimuro-Zavodsky District
- Time zone: UTC+9:00

Kuryumdyukan (Russian: Курюмдюкан) is a rural locality (a selo) in Gazimuro-Zavodsky District, Zabaykalsky Krai, Russia. Population: 62 (2010 census); 80 (2002 census); There are 3 streets in this selo.

== Geography ==
This rural locality is located 30 km from Gazimursky Zavod (the district's administrative centre), 343 km from Chita (capital of Zabaykalsky Krai) and 5,576 km from Moscow. Kungara is the nearest rural locality.
