= Kyeken =

Kyeken Кыэкен
- Selo
- Location within Zabaykalsky Krai Location within Russia
- Coordinates: 52°03′N 115°25′E
- Country: Russia
- Region: Zabaykalsky Krai
- District: Shilkinsky District
- Time zone: UTC+9:00

Kyeken (Russian: Кыэкен) is a rural locality (a selo) in Shilkinsky District, Zabaykalsky Krai, Russia. Population: 97 (2010 census); 121 (2002 census); There are 3 streets in this selo.

== Geography ==
This rural locality is located 48 km from Shilka (the district's administrative centre), 131 km from Chita (capital of Zabaykalsky Krai) and 5,334 km from Moscow. Srednyaya Kiya is the nearest rural locality.
