= Zulzikan =

Zulzikan Зюльзикан
- Selo
- Location within Zabaykalsky Krai Location within Russia
- Coordinates: 52°40′N 116°16′E
- Country: Russia
- Region: Zabaykalsky Krai
- District: Nerchinsky District
- Time zone: UTC+9:00

Zulzikan (Russian: Зюльзикан) is a rural locality (a selo) in Nerchinsky District, Zabaykalsky Krai, Russia. Population: 326 (2021 census); 336 (2010 census); 402 (2002 census); There are 4 streets in this selo.

== Geography ==
This rural locality is located 81 km from Nerchinsk (the district's administrative centre), 201 km from Chita (capital of Zabaykalsky Krai) and 5,315 km from Moscow. Zyulzya is the nearest rural locality.
