= Olenguy =

Olenguy Оленгуй
- Selo
- Location within Zabaykalsky Krai Location within Russia
- Coordinates: 51°18′N 113°24′E
- Country: Russia
- Region: Zabaykalsky Krai
- District: Chitinsky District
- Time zone: UTC+9:00

Olenguy (Russian: Оленгуй) is a rural locality (a selo) in Chitinsky District, Zabaykalsky Krai, Russia. Population: 229 (2021 census); 271 (2010 census); There are 5 streets in this selo.

== Geography ==
This rural locality is located 81 km from Chita (the district's administrative centre and capital of Zabaykalsky Krai) and 5,292 km from Moscow. Sypchegur is the nearest rural locality.
