= Biliktuy =

Biliktuy Биликтуй
- Selo
- Location within Zabaykalsky Krai Location within Russia
- Coordinates: 50°43′N 116°54′E
- Country: Russia
- Region: Zabaykalsky Krai
- District: Borzinsky District
- Time zone: UTC+9:00

Biliktuy (Russian: Биликтуй) is a rural locality (a selo) in Borzinsky District, Zabaykalsky Krai, Russia. Population: 174 (2021 census); 295 (2010 census); 484 (2002 census); There are 5 streets in this selo.

== Geography ==
This rural locality is located 46 km from Borzya (the district's administrative centre), 281 km from Chita (capital of Zabaykalsky Krai) and 5,610 km from Moscow. Perednyaya Byrka is the nearest rural locality.
