= Ulyatuy =

Ulyatuy Улятуй
- Selo
- Location within Zabaykalsky Krai Location within Russia
- Coordinates: 51°10′N 116°14′E
- Country: Russia
- Region: Zabaykalsky Krai
- District: Olovyanninsky District
- Time zone: UTC+9:00

Ulyatuy (Russian: Улятуй) is a rural locality (a selo) in Olovyanninsky District, Zabaykalsky Krai, Russia. Population: 643 (2021 census); 795 (2010 census); 1,009 (2002 census); There are 11 streets in this selo.

== Geography ==
This rural locality is located 53 km from Olovyannaya (the district's administrative centre), 214 km from Chita (capital of Zabaykalsky Krai) and 5,506 km from Moscow. Kamkay is the nearest rural locality.
