= Staraya Kuka =

Staraya Kuka Старая Кука
- Selo
- Location within Zabaykalsky Krai Location within Russia
- Coordinates: 51°45′N 113°03′E
- Country: Russia
- Region: Zabaykalsky Krai
- District: Chitinsky District
- Time zone: UTC+9:00

Staraya Kuka (Russian: Старая Кука) is a rural locality (a selo) in Chitinsky District, Zabaykalsky Krai, Russia. Population: 284 (2021 census); 303 (2010 census); There are 5 streets in this selo.

== Geography ==
This rural locality is located 43 km from Chita (the district's administrative centre and capital of Zabaykalsky Krai) and 5,212 km from Moscow. Lesnoy Gorodok is the nearest rural locality.
