= Beryozovo, Zabaykalsky Krai =

Beryozovo Берёзово
- Selo
- Location within Zabaykalsky Krai Location within Russia
- Coordinates: 52°09′N 116°27′E
- Country: Russia
- Region: Zabaykalsky Krai
- District: Nerchinsky District
- Time zone: UTC+9:00

Beryozovo (Russian: Берёзово) is a rural locality (a selo) in Nerchinsky District, Zabaykalsky Krai, Russia. Population: 215 (2021 census); 264 (2010 census); 337 (2002 census); There are 5 streets in this selo.

== Geography ==
This rural locality is located 22 km from Nerchinsk (the district's administrative centre), 202 km from Chita (capital of Zabaykalsky Krai) and 5,393 km from Moscow. Znamenka is the nearest rural locality.
