= Gutay, Zabaykalsky Krai =

Gutay Гутай
- Selo
- Location within Zabaykalsky Krai Location within Russia
- Coordinates: 49°59′N 108°11′E
- Country: Russia
- Region: Zabaykalsky Krai
- District: Krasnochikoysky District
- Time zone: UTC+9:00

Gutay (Russian: Гутай) is a rural locality (a selo) in Krasnochikoysky District, Zabaykalsky Krai, Russia. Population: 67 (2021 census); 88 (2010 census); 154 (2002 census); There is 1 street in this selo.

== Geography ==
This rural locality is located 57 km from Krasny Chikoy (the district's administrative centre), 442 km from Chita (capital of Zabaykalsky Krai) and 5,086 km from Moscow. NIzhny Narym is the nearest rural locality.
