= Kulan, Zabaykalsky Krai =

Kulan Кулан
- Selo
- Location within Zabaykalsky Krai Location within Russia
- Coordinates: 52°23′N 117°21′E
- Country: Russia
- Region: Zabaykalsky Krai
- District: Sretensky District
- Time zone: UTC+9:00

Kulan (Russian: Кулан) is a rural locality (a selo) in Sretensky District, Zabaykalsky Krai, Russia. Population: 108 (2010 census); 139 (2002 census); There are 3 streets in this selo.

== Geography ==
This rural locality is located 30 km from Sretensk (the district's administrative centre), 265 km from Chita (capital of Zabaykalsky Krai) and 5,423 km from Moscow. Kurlych is the nearest rural locality.
