= Kolochnoye 1-ye =

Kolochnoye 1-ye Колочное 1-е
- Selo
- Location within Zabaykalsky Krai Location within Russia
- Coordinates: 51°57′N 113°09′E
- Country: Russia
- Region: Zabaykalsky Krai
- District: Chitinsky District
- Time zone: UTC+9:00

Kolochnoye 1-ye (Russian: Колочное 1-е) is a rural locality (a selo) in Chitinsky District, Zabaykalsky Krai, Russia. Population: 7 (2021 census); 43 (2010 census); There is 1 street in this selo.

== Geography ==
This rural locality is located 24 km from Chita (the district's administrative centre and capital of Zabaykalsky Krai) and 5,193 km from Moscow. Kolochnoye 2-ye is the nearest rural locality.
