= Sokhondo, Zabaykalsky Krai =

Sokhondo Сохондо
- Selo
- Location within Zabaykalsky Krai Location within Russia
- Coordinates: 51°48′N 112°31′E
- Country: Russia
- Region: Zabaykalsky Krai
- District: Chitinsky District
- Time zone: UTC+9:00

Sokhondo (Russian: Сохондо) is a rural locality (a selo) in Chitinsky District, Zabaykalsky Krai, Russia. Population: 960 (2021 census); 1,072 (2010 census); There are 24 streets in this selo.

== Geography ==
This rural locality is located 71 km from Chita (the district's administrative centre and capital of Zabaykalsky Krai) and 5,168 km from Moscow. Turgutuy is the nearest rural locality.
