= Yeryomino, Zabaykalsky Krai =

Yeryomino Ерёмино
- Selo
- Location within Zabaykalsky Krai Location within Russia
- Coordinates: 51°57′N 113°20′E
- Country: Russia
- Region: Zabaykalsky Krai
- District: Chitinsky District
- Time zone: UTC+9:00

Yeryomino (Russian: Ерёмино) is a rural locality (a selo) in Chitinsky District, Zabaykalsky Krai, Russia. Population: 240 (2021 census); 290 (2010 census); There are 8 streets in this selo.

== Geography ==
This rural locality is located 14 km from Chita (the district's administrative centre and capital of Zabaykalsky Krai) and 5,206 km from Moscow. Kadala is the nearest rural locality.
