= Step, Zabaykalsky Krai =

Step Степь
- Selo
- Location within Zabaykalsky Krai Location within Russia
- Coordinates: 51°00′N 115°23′E
- Country: Russia
- Region: Zabaykalsky Krai
- District: Olovyanninsky District
- Time zone: UTC+9:00

Step (Russian: Степь) is a rural locality (a selo) in Olovyanninsky District, Zabaykalsky Krai, Russia. Population: 488 (2021 census); 2,753 (2010 census); 3,038 (2002 census); There are 14 streets in this selo.

== Geography ==
This rural locality is located 14 km from Olovyannaya (the district's administrative centre), 176 km from Chita (capital of Zabaykalsky Krai) and 5,468 km from Moscow. Bulak is the nearest rural locality.
