= Stary Durulguy =

Stary Durulguy Старый Дурулгуй
- Selo
- Location within Zabaykalsky Krai Location within Russia
- Coordinates: 50°28′N 114°18′E
- Country: Russia
- Region: Zabaykalsky Krai
- District: Ononsky District
- Time zone: UTC+9:00

Stary Durulguy (Russian: Старый Дурулгуй) is a rural locality (a selo) in Ononsky District, Zabaykalsky Krai, Russia. Population: 114 (2021 census); 154 (2010 census); 184 (2002 census); There are 5 streets in this selo.

== Geography ==
This rural locality is located 58 km from Nizhny Tsasuchey (the district's administrative centre), 182 km from Chita (capital of Zabaykalsky Krai) and 5,458 km from Moscow. Tut-Khaltuy is the nearest rural locality.
