= Bayka =

Bayka Байка
- Selo
- Location within Zabaykalsky Krai Location within Russia
- Coordinates: 51°15′N 119°17′E
- Country: Russia
- Region: Zabaykalsky Krai
- District: Nerchinsko-Zavodsky District
- Time zone: UTC+9:00

Bayka (Russian: Байка) is a rural locality (a selo) in Nerchinsko-Zavodsky District, Zabaykalsky Krai, Russia. Population: 247 (2021 census); 286 (2010 census); 365 (2002 census); There are 4 streets in this selo.

== Geography ==
This rural locality is located 22 km from Nerchinsky Zavod (the district's administrative centre), 413 km from Chita (capital of Zabaykalsky Krai) and 5,706 km from Moscow. Zolotonosha is the nearest rural locality.
