= Alentuy =

Alentuy Алентуй
- Selo
- Location within Zabaykalsky Krai Location within Russia
- Coordinates: 50°52′N 108°28′E
- Country: Russia
- Region: Zabaykalsky Krai
- District: Petrovsk-Zabaykalsky District
- Time zone: UTC+9:00

Alentuy (Russian: Алентуй) is a rural locality (a selo) in Petrovsk-Zabaykalsky District, Zabaykalsky Krai, Russia. Population: 116 (2021 census); 129 (2010 census); 12 (2002 census); There are 4 streets in this selo.

== Geography ==
This rural locality is located 51 km from Petrovsk-Zabaykalsky (the district's administrative centre), 375 km from Chita (capital of Zabaykalsky Krai) and 5,000 km from Moscow. Maleta is the nearest rural locality.
