= Novoshirokinsky =

Novoshirokinsky Новоширокинский
- Settlement
- Location within Zabaykalsky Krai Location within Russia
- Coordinates: 51°34′N 118°38′E
- Country: Russia
- Region: Zabaykalsky Krai
- District: Gazimuro-Zavodsky District
- Time zone: UTC+9:00

Novoshirokinsky (Russian: Новоширокинский) is a rural locality (a settlement) in Gazimuro-Zavodsky District, Zabaykalsky Krai, Russia. Population: 994 (2021 census); 961 (2010 census); 698 (2002 census); There are 4 streets in this settlement.
