= Zakulta =

Zakulta Закульта
- Selo
- Location within Zabaykalsky Krai Location within Russia
- Coordinates: 51°21′N 109°44′E
- Country: Russia
- Region: Zabaykalsky Krai
- District: Khiloksky District
- Time zone: UTC+9:00

Zakulta (Russian: Закульта) is a rural locality (a selo) in Khiloksky District, Zabaykalsky Krai, Russia. Population: 373 (2021 census); 473 (2010 census); There are 5 streets in this selo.

== Geography ==
This rural locality is located 50 km from Khilok (the district's administrative centre), 272 km from Chita (capital of Zabaykalsky Krai) and 5,031 km from Moscow. Mukhor-Shibirka is the nearest rural locality.
