= Ust-Kurlych =

Ust-Kurlych Усть-Курлыч
- Selo
- Location within Zabaykalsky Krai Location within Russia
- Coordinates: 52°09′N 117°27′E
- Country: Russia
- Region: Zabaykalsky Krai
- District: Sretensky District
- Time zone: UTC+9:00

Ust-Kurlych (Russian: Усть-Курлыч) is a rural locality (a selo) in Sretensky District, Zabaykalsky Krai, Russia. Population: 194 (2010 census); 207 (2002 census); There are 2 streets in this selo.

== Geography ==
This rural locality is located 20 km from Sretensk (the district's administrative centre), 270 km from Chita (capital of Zabaykalsky Krai) and 5,460 km from Moscow. Delyun is the nearest rural locality.
