= Kurleya =

Kurleya Курлея
- Selo
- Location within Zabaykalsky Krai Location within Russia
- Coordinates: 52°11′N 119°07′E
- Country: Russia
- Region: Zabaykalsky Krai
- District: Gazimuro-Zavodsky District
- Time zone: UTC+9:00

Kurleya (Russian: Курлея) is a rural locality (a selo) in Gazimuro-Zavodsky District, Zabaykalsky Krai, Russia. Population: 6 (2010 census); 10 (2002 census); There is 1 street in this selo.

== Geography ==
This rural locality is located 89 km from Gazimursky Zavod (the district's administrative centre), 384 km from Chita (capital of Zabaykalsky Krai) and 5,571 km from Moscow. Zakamennaya is the nearest rural locality.
