= Tankha =

Tankha Танха
- Selo
- Location within Zabaykalsky Krai Location within Russia
- Coordinates: 51°59′N 113°58′E
- Country: Russia
- Region: Zabaykalsky Krai
- District: Chitinsky District
- Time zone: UTC+9:00

Tankha (Russian: Танха) is a rural locality (a selo) in Chitinsky District, Zabaykalsky Krai, Russia. Population: 354 (2010 census); 353 (2002 census); There are 7 streets in this selo.

== Geography ==
This rural locality is located 33 km from Chita (the district's administrative centre and capital of Zabaykalsky Krai) and 5,244 km from Moscow. Novotroitsk is the nearest rural locality.
