= Mygzha =

Mygzha Мыгжа
- Selo
- Location within Zabaykalsky Krai Location within Russia
- Coordinates: 52°20′N 117°25′E
- Country: Russia
- Region: Zabaykalsky Krai
- District: Sretensky District
- Time zone: UTC+9:00

Mygzha (Russian: Мыгжа) is a rural locality (a selo) in Sretensky District, Zabaykalsky Krai, Russia. Population: 7 (2021 census); 11 (2010 census); 11 (2002 census); There is 1 street in this selo.

== Geography ==
This rural locality is located 22 km from Sretensk (the district's administrative centre), 269 km from Chita (capital of Zabaykalsky Krai) and 5,435 km from Moscow. Chikichey is the nearest rural locality.
