= Ukurey =

Ukurey Укурей
- Selo
- Location within Zabaykalsky Krai Location within Russia
- Coordinates: 52°20′N 117°00′E
- Country: Russia
- Region: Zabaykalsky Krai
- District: Chernyshevsky District
- Time zone: UTC+9:00

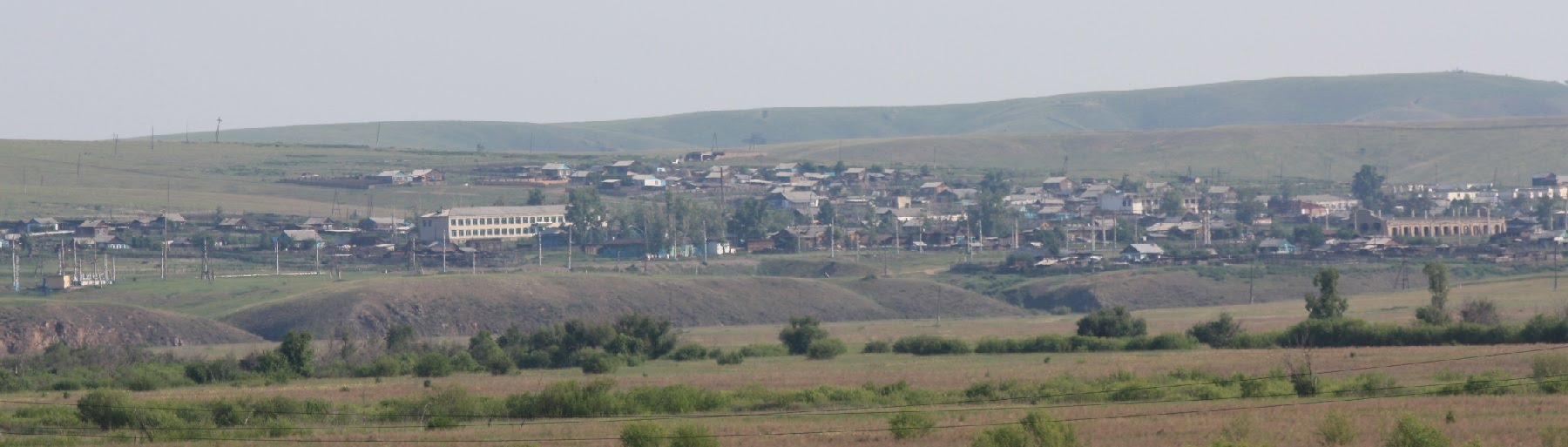
View of Ukurey

Ukurey (Russian: Укурей) is a rural locality (a selo) in Chernyshevsky District, Zabaykalsky Krai, Russia. Population: 557 (2021 census); 662 (2010 census); There are 6 streets in this selo.

== Geography ==
This rural locality is located 20 km from Chernyshevsk (the district's administrative centre), 242 km from Chita (capital of Zabaykalsky Krai) and 5,407 km from Moscow. Shiviya-Nadelyayevo is the nearest rural locality.
