= Semiozyorye, Krasnochikoysky District, Zabaykalsky Krai =

Semiozyorye Семиозёрье
- Selo
- Location within Zabaykalsky Krai Location within Russia
- Coordinates: 49°49′N 110°26′E
- Country: Russia
- Region: Zabaykalsky Krai
- District: Krasnochikoysky District
- Time zone: UTC+9:00

Semiozyorye (Russian: Семиозёрье) is a rural locality (a selo) in Krasnochikoysky District, Zabaykalsky Krai, Russia. Population: 11 (2021 census); 24 (2010 census); 43 (2002 census); There are 2 streets in this selo.

== Geography ==
This rural locality is located 136 km from Krasny Chikoy (the district's administrative centre), 330 km from Chita (capital of Zabaykalsky Krai) and 5,267 km from Moscow.
