= Ushmun, Zabaykalsky Krai =

Ushmun Ушмун
- Selo
- Location within Zabaykalsky Krai Location within Russia
- Coordinates: 51°40′N 118°21′E
- Country: Russia
- Region: Zabaykalsky Krai
- District: Gazimuro-Zavodsky District
- Time zone: UTC+9:00

Ushmun (Russian: Ушмун) is a rural locality (a selo) in Gazimuro-Zavodsky District, Zabaykalsky Krai, Russia. Population: 505 (2021 census); 565 (2010 census); 651 (2002 census); There are 10 streets in this selo.

== Geography ==
This rural locality is located 15 km from Gazimursky Zavod (the district's administrative centre), 338 km from Chita (capital of Zabaykalsky Krai) and 5,586 km from Moscow. Kaldaga is the nearest rural locality.
