= Krasnoyarovo, Shilkinsky District, Zabaykalsky Krai =

Krasnoyarovo Красноярово
- Selo
- Location within Zabaykalsky Krai Location within Russia
- Coordinates: 51°46′N 115°35′E
- Country: Russia
- Region: Zabaykalsky Krai
- District: Shilkinsky District
- Time zone: UTC+9:00

Krasnoyarovo (Russian: Красноярово) is a rural locality (a selo) in Shilkinsky District, Zabaykalsky Krai, Russia. Population: 215 (2021 census); 248 (2010 census); There are 5 streets in this selo.

== Geography ==
This rural locality is located 32 km from Shilka (the district's administrative centre), 340.55 km from Chita (capital of Zabaykalsky Krai) and 5,384 km from Moscow. Shivanda is the nearest rural locality.
