= Priozernoye, Zabaykalsky Krai =

Priozernoye Приозёрное
- Selo
- Location within Zabaykalsky Krai Location within Russia
- Coordinates: 50°29′N 116°16′E
- Country: Russia
- Region: Zabaykalsky Krai
- District: Borzinsky District
- Time zone: UTC+9:00

Priozernoye (Russian: Приозёрное) is a rural locality (a selo) in Borzinsky District, Zabaykalsky Krai, Russia. Population: 257 (2021 census); 358 (2010 census); 491 (2002 census); There are 5 streets in this selo.
