= Makkaveyevo =

Makkaveyevo Маккавеево
- Selo
- Location within Zabaykalsky Krai Location within Russia
- Coordinates: 51°45′N 113°55′E
- Country: Russia
- Region: Zabaykalsky Krai
- District: Chitinsky District
- Time zone: UTC+9:00

Makkaveyevo (Russian: Маккавеево) is a rural locality (a selo) in Chitinsky District, Zabaykalsky Krai, Russia. Population: 4,991 (2021 census); 4,145 (2010 census); There are 47 streets in this selo.

== Geography ==
This rural locality is located 44 km from Chita (the district's administrative centre and capital of Zabaykalsky Krai) and 5,274 km from Moscow. Novokruchininsky is the nearest rural locality.
