= Sivyakovo =

Sivyakovo Сивяково
- Selo
- Location within Zabaykalsky Krai Location within Russia
- Coordinates: 51°53′N 113°13′E
- Country: Russia
- Region: Zabaykalsky Krai
- District: Chitinsky District
- Time zone: UTC+9:00

Sivyakovo (Russian: Сивяково) is a rural locality (a selo) in Chitinsky District, Zabaykalsky Krai, Russia. Population: 684 (2021 census); 650 (2010 census); There are 11 streets in this selo.

== Geography ==
This rural locality is located 24 km from Chita (the district's administrative centre and capital of Zabaykalsky Krai) and 5,206 km from Moscow. Amodovo is the nearest rural locality.
