= Ust-Telenguy =

Ust-Telenguy Усть-Теленгуй
- Selo
- Location within Zabaykalsky Krai Location within Russia
- Coordinates: 51°32′N 115°57′E
- Country: Russia
- Region: Zabaykalsky Krai
- District: Shilkinsky District
- Time zone: UTC+9:00

Ust-Telenguy (Russian: Усть-Теленгуй) is a rural locality (a selo) in Shilkinsky District, Zabaykalsky Krai, Russia. Population: 441 (2021 census); 513 (2010 census); There are 9 streets in this selo.

== Geography ==
This rural locality is located 34 km from Shilka (the district's administrative centre), 179 km from Chita (capital of Zabaykalsky Krai) and 5,438 km from Moscow. Makarovo is the nearest rural locality.
