= Verkhny Tsasuchey =

Selo in Zabaykalsky Krai, Russia

Verkhny Tsasuchey Верхний Цасучей
- Selo
- Location within Zabaykalsky Krai Location within Russia
- Coordinates: 50°30′N 115°06′E
- Country: Russia
- Region: Zabaykalsky Krai
- District: Ononsky District
- Time zone: UTC+9:00

Verkhny Tsasuchey (Russian: Верхний Цасучей) is a rural locality (a selo) in Ononsky District, Zabaykalsky Krai, Russia. Population: 1,026 (2021 census); 945 (2010 census); 1,007 (2002 census); There are 13 streets in this selo.

== Geography ==
This rural locality is located 2 km from Nizhny Tsasuchey (the district's administrative centre), 204 km from Chita (capital of Zabaykalsky Krai) and 5,510 km from Moscow. Nizhny Tsasuchey is the nearest rural locality.
