= Bukhta =

Bukhta Бухта
- Selo
- Location within Zabaykalsky Krai Location within Russia
- Coordinates: 52°55′N 116°48′E
- Country: Russia
- Region: Zabaykalsky Krai
- District: Chernyshevsky District
- Time zone: UTC+9:00

Bukhta (Russian: Бухта) is a rural locality (a selo) in Chernyshevsky District, Zabaykalsky Krai, Russia. Population: 27 (2021 census); 43 (2010 census); There are 2 streets in this selo.

== Geography ==
This rural locality is located 46 km from Chernyshevsk (the district's administrative centre), 243 km from Chita (capital of Zabaykalsky Krai) and 5,318 km from Moscow. Bukachacha is the nearest rural locality.
