= Urovskiye Klyuchi =

Urovskiye Klyuchi Уровские Ключи
- Selo
- Location within Zabaykalsky Krai Location within Russia
- Coordinates: 51°41′N 119°27′E
- Country: Russia
- Region: Zabaykalsky Krai
- District: Nerchinsko-Zavodsky District
- Time zone: UTC+9:00

Urovskiye Klyuchi (Russian: Уровские Ключи) is a rural locality (a selo) in Nerchinsko-Zavodsky District, Zabaykalsky Krai, Russia. Population: 227 (2021 census); 332 (2010 census); 386 (2002 census); There are 2 streets in this selo.

== Geography ==
This rural locality is located 44 km from Nerchinsky Zavod (the district's administrative centre), 413 km from Chita (capital of Zabaykalsky Krai) and 5,660 km from Moscow. Patrino is the nearest rural locality.
