= Verkhnyaya Kuenga =

Verkhnyaya Kuenga Верхняя Куэнга
- Selo
- Location within Zabaykalsky Krai Location within Russia
- Coordinates: 52°07′N 117°03′E
- Country: Russia
- Region: Zabaykalsky Krai
- District: Sretensky District
- Time zone: UTC+9:00

Verkhnyaya Kuenga (Russian: Верхняя Куэнга) is a rural locality (a selo) in Sretensky District, Zabaykalsky Krai, Russia. Population: 390 (2021 census); 458 (2010 census); 651 (2002 census); There are 9 streets in this selo.

== Geography ==
This rural locality is located 46 km from Sretensk (the district's administrative centre), 243 km from Chita (capital of Zabaykalsky Krai) and 5,437 km from Moscow. Nizhnyaya Kuenga is the nearest rural locality.
