= Korabl =

Korabl Корабль
- Selo
- Location within Zabaykalsky Krai Location within Russia
- Coordinates: 51°31′N 118°17′E
- Country: Russia
- Region: Zabaykalsky Krai
- District: Gazimuro-Zavodsky District
- Time zone: UTC+9:00

Korabl (Russian: Корабль) is a rural locality (a selo) in Gazimuro-Zavodsky District, Zabaykalsky Krai, Russia. Population: 107 (2010 census); 105 (2002 census); There are 3 streets in this selo.

== Geography ==
This rural locality is located 4 km from Gazimursky Zavod (the district's administrative centre), 336 km from Chita (capital of Zabaykalsky Krai) and 5,601 km from Moscow. Pavlovsk is the nearest rural locality.
