= Nanagry =

Nanagry Нанагры
- Selo
- Location within Zabaykalsky Krai Location within Russia
- Coordinates: 53°14′N 118°17′E
- Country: Russia
- Region: Zabaykalsky Krai
- District: Mogochinsky District
- Time zone: UTC+9:00

Nanagry (Russian: Нанагры) is a rural locality (a selo) in Mogochinsky District, Zabaykalsky Krai, Russia. Population: 47 (2021 census); 65 (2010 census); 80 (2002 census); There is 1 street in this selo.

== Geography ==
This rural locality is located 112 km from Mogocha (the district's administrative centre), 346 km from Chita (capital of Zabaykalsky Krai) and 5,376 km from Moscow. Dzhelonda is the nearest rural locality.
