= Zutkuley =

Zutkuley Зуткулей
- Selo
- Location within Zabaykalsky Krai Location within Russia
- Coordinates: 50°39′N 114°11′E
- Country: Russia
- Region: Zabaykalsky Krai
- District: Duldurginsky District
- Time zone: UTC+9:00

Zutkuley (Russian: Зуткулей) is a rural locality (a selo) in Duldurginsky District, Zabaykalsky Krai, Russia. Population: 1,378 (2021 census); 1,688 (2010 census); 1,806 (2002 census); There are 8 streets in this selo.

== Geography ==
This rural locality is located 42 km from Duldurga (the district's administrative centre), 160 km from Chita (capital of Zabaykalsky Krai) and 5,427 km from Moscow. Tokchin is the nearest rural locality.
