= Nizhnyaya Khila =

Nizhnyaya Khila Нижняя Хила
- Selo
- Location within Zabaykalsky Krai Location within Russia
- Coordinates: 52°03′N 116°09′E
- Country: Russia
- Region: Zabaykalsky Krai
- District: Shilkinsky District
- Time zone: UTC+9:00

Nizhnyaya Khila (Russian: Нижняя Хила) is a rural locality (a selo) in Shilkinsky District, Zabaykalsky Krai, Russia. Population: 161 (2010 census); 216 (2002 census); There are 3 streets in this selo.

== Geography ==
This rural locality is located 25 km from Shilka (the district's administrative centre), 181 km from Chita (capital of Zabaykalsky Krai) and 5,385 km from Moscow. Novoberezovskoye is the nearest rural locality.
