= Levye Kumaki =

Levye Kumaki Левые Кумаки
- Selo
- Location within Zabaykalsky Krai Location within Russia
- Coordinates: 52°03′N 116°22′E
- Country: Russia
- Region: Zabaykalsky Krai
- District: Nerchinsky District
- Time zone: UTC+9:00

Levye Kumaki (Russian: Левые Кумаки) is a rural locality (a selo) in Nerchinsky District, Zabaykalsky Krai, Russia. Population: 263 (2021 census); 273 (2010 census); 327 (2002 census); There are 3 streets in this selo.

== Geography ==
This rural locality is located 17 km from Nerchinsk (the district's administrative centre), 197 km from Chita (capital of Zabaykalsky Krai) and 5,401 km from Moscow. Zarechny is the nearest rural locality.
