= Maleta, Zabaykalsky Krai =

Maleta Малета
- Selo
- Location within Zabaykalsky Krai Location within Russia
- Coordinates: 50°50′N 108°25′E
- Country: Russia
- Region: Zabaykalsky Krai
- District: Petrovsk-Zabaykalsky District
- Time zone: UTC+9:00

Maleta (Russian: Малета) is a rural locality (a selo) in Petrovsk-Zabaykalsky District, Zabaykalsky Krai, Russia. Population: 2,467 (2021 census); 2,863 (2010 census); 2,839 (2002 census); There are 29 streets in this selo.

== Geography ==
This rural locality is located 57 km from Petrovsk-Zabaykalsky (the district's administrative centre), 381 km from Chita (capital of Zabaykalsky Krai) and 5,002 km from Moscow. Sokhotoy is the nearest rural locality.
