= Zhipkovshchina =

Zhipkovshchina Жипковщина
- Selo
- Location within Zabaykalsky Krai Location within Russia
- Coordinates: 51°48′N 113°01′E
- Country: Russia
- Region: Zabaykalsky Krai
- District: Chitinsky District
- Time zone: UTC+9:00

Zhipkovshchina (Russian: Жипковщина) is a rural locality (a selo) in Chitinsky District, Zabaykalsky Krai, Russia. Population: 557 (2021 census); 558 (2010 census); There are 5 streets in this selo.

== Geography ==
This rural locality is located 42 km from Chita (the district's administrative centre and capital of Zabaykalsky Krai) and 5,203 km from Moscow. Novaya Kuka is the nearest rural locality.
