= Ilim, Zabaykalsky Krai =

Ilim Илим
- Selo
- Location within Zabaykalsky Krai Location within Russia
- Coordinates: 52°12′N 116°02′E
- Country: Russia
- Region: Zabaykalsky Krai
- District: Nerchinsky District
- Time zone: UTC+9:00

Ilim (Russian: Илим) is a rural locality (a selo) in Nerchinsky District, Zabaykalsky Krai, Russia. Population: 681 (2021 census); 665 (2010 census); 797 (2002 census); There are 10 streets in this selo.

== Geography ==
This rural locality is located 46 km from Nerchinsk (the district's administrative centre), 174 km from Chita (capital of Zabaykalsky Krai) and 5,357 km from Moscow. Novoberezovskoye is the nearest rural locality.
