= Lesnoy Gorodok, Zabaykalsky Krai =

Lesnoy Gorodok Лесной Городок
- Settlement
- Location within Zabaykalsky Krai Location within Russia
- Coordinates: 51°44′N 113°03′E
- Country: Russia
- Region: Zabaykalsky Krai
- District: Chitinsky District
- Time zone: UTC+9:00

Lesnoy Gorodok (Russian: Лесной Городок) is a rural locality (a settlement) in Chitinsky District, Zabaykalsky Krai, Russia. Population: 1,097 (2021 census); 1,368 (2010 census); There are 12 streets in this settlement.

== Geography ==
This rural locality is located 43 km from Chita (the district's administrative centre and capital of Zabaykalsky Krai) and 5,213 km from Moscow. Staraya Kuka is the nearest rural locality.
