= Leninsky, Zabaykalsky Krai =

Leninsky Ленинский
- Settlement
- Location within Zabaykalsky Krai Location within Russia
- Coordinates: 51°07′N 113°04′E
- Country: Russia
- Region: Zabaykalsky Krai
- District: Chitinsky District
- Time zone: UTC+9:00

Leninsky (Russian: Ленинский) is a rural locality (a settlement) in Chitinsky District, Zabaykalsky Krai, Russia. Population: 194 (2021 census); 278 (2010 census); There are 8 streets in this settlement.

== Geography ==
This rural locality is located 105 km from Chita (the district's administrative centre and capital of Zabaykalsky Krai) and 5,291 km from Moscow. Ara-Ilya is the nearest rural locality.
