= Krupyanka, Zabaykalsky Krai =

Krupyanka Крупянка
- Selo
- Location within Zabaykalsky Krai Location within Russia
- Coordinates: 52°28′N 116°10′E
- Country: Russia
- Region: Zabaykalsky Krai
- District: Nerchinsky District
- Time zone: UTC+9:00

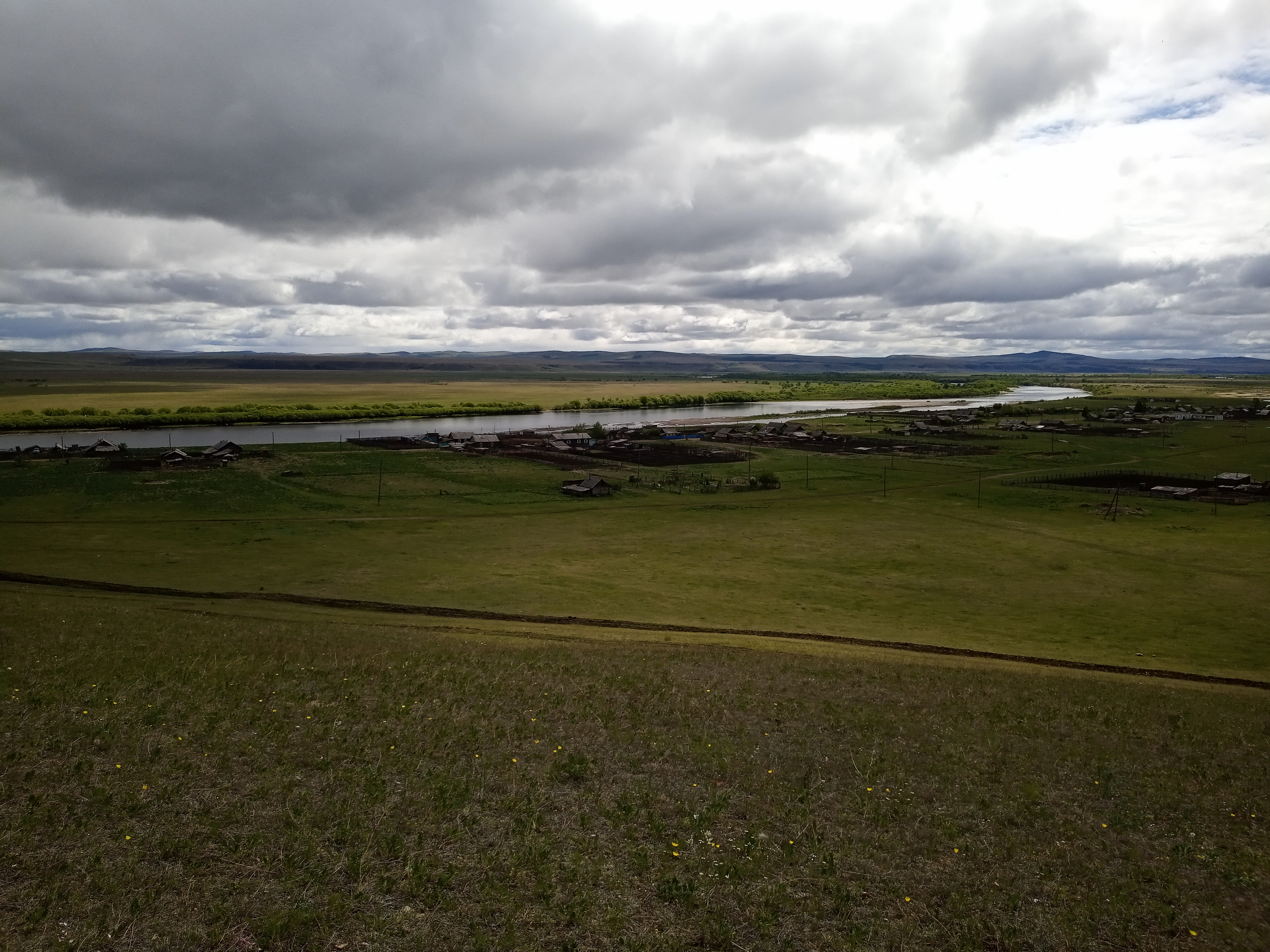
Village of Krupyanka, 2020

Krupyanka (Russian: Крупянка) is a rural locality (a selo) in Nerchinsky District, Zabaykalsky Krai, Russia. Population: 140 (2021 census); There is 1 streets in this selo.

== Geography ==
This rural locality is located 62 km from Nerchinsk (the district's administrative centre), 188 km from Chita (capital of Zabaykalsky Krai) and 5,333 km from Moscow. Bolshoy Lug is the nearest rural locality.
