= Bezrechnaya, Zabaykalsky Krai =

Bezrechnaya Безречная
- Settlement
- Location within Zabaykalsky Krai Location within Russia
- Coordinates: 50°43′N 116°10′E
- Country: Russia
- Region: Zabaykalsky Krai
- District: Olovyanninsky District
- Time zone: UTC+9:00

Bezrechnaya (Russian: Безречная) is a rural locality (a settlement) in Olovyanninsky District, Zabaykalsky Krai, Russia. Population: 436 (2021 census); 679 (2010 census); 1,487 (2002 census); There are 16 streets in this settlement.
