= Verkhny Sharanay =

Verkhny Sharanay Верхний Шаранай
- Selo
- Location within Zabaykalsky Krai Location within Russia
- Coordinates: 51°04′N 115°45′E
- Country: Russia
- Region: Zabaykalsky Krai
- District: Olovyanninsky District
- Time zone: UTC+9:00

Verkhny Sharanay (Russian: Верхний Шаранай) is a rural locality (a selo) in Olovyanninsky District, Zabaykalsky Krai, Russia. Population: 227 (2021 census); 348 (2010 census); 494 (2002 census); There are 5 streets in this selo.

== Geography ==
This rural locality is located 20 km from Olovyannaya (the district's administrative centre), 191 km from Chita (capital of Zabaykalsky Krai) and 5,484 km from Moscow. Sredny Sharanay is the nearest rural locality.
