= Aleur, Chernyshevsky District, Zabaykalsky Krai =

Aleur Алеур
- Selo
- Location within Zabaykalsky Krai Location within Russia
- Coordinates: 52°32′N 117°02′E
- Country: Russia
- Region: Zabaykalsky Krai
- District: Chernyshevsky District
- Time zone: UTC+9:00

Aleur (Russian: Алеур) is a rural locality (a selo) in Chernyshevsky District, Zabaykalsky Krai, Russia. Population: 945 (2021 census); 1,005 (2010 census); There are 5 streets in this selo.

== Geography ==
This rural locality is located 5 km from Chernyshevsk (the district's administrative centre), 248 km from Chita (capital of Zabaykalsky Krai) and 5,382 km from Moscow. Chernyshevsk is the nearest rural locality.
