= Moklakan =

Moklakan Моклакан
- Selo
- Location within Zabaykalsky Krai Location within Russia
- Coordinates: 54°43′N 118°52′E
- Country: Russia
- Region: Zabaykalsky Krai
- District: Tungiro-Olyokminsky District
- Time zone: UTC+9:00

Moklakan (Russian: Моклакан) is a rural locality (a selo) in Tungiro-Olyokminsky District, Zabaykalsky Krai, Russia. Population: 67 (2021 census); 71 (2010 census); 116 (2002 census); There are 2 streets in this selo.

== Geography ==
This rural locality is located 76 km from Tupik (the district's administrative centre), 457 km from Chita (capital of Zabaykalsky Krai) and 5,219 km from Moscow.
