= Volochayevka, Zabaykalsky Krai =

Volochayevka Волочаевка
- Selo
- Location within Zabaykalsky Krai Location within Russia
- Coordinates: 51°42′N 116°17′E
- Country: Russia
- Region: Zabaykalsky Krai
- District: Nerchinsky District
- Time zone: UTC+9:00

Volochayevka (Russian: Волочаевка) is a rural locality (a selo) in Nerchinsky District, Zabaykalsky Krai, Russia. Population: 14 (2021 census); 20 (2010 census); There are 4 streets in this selo.

== Geography ==
This rural locality is located 35 km from Nerchinsk (the district's administrative centre), 196 km from Chita (capital of Zabaykalsky Krai) and 5,439 km from Moscow. Andronnikovo is the nearest rural locality.
