= Kirocha =

Kirocha Кироча
- Selo
- Location within Zabaykalsky Krai Location within Russia
- Coordinates: 51°36′N 115°50′E
- Country: Russia
- Region: Zabaykalsky Krai
- District: Shilkinsky District
- Time zone: UTC+9:00

Kirocha (Russian: Кироча) is a rural locality (a selo) in Shilkinsky District, Zabaykalsky Krai, Russia. Population: 133 (2010 census); 153 (2002 census); There are 2 streets in this selo.

== Geography ==
This rural locality is located 31 km from Shilka (the district's administrative centre), 169 km from Chita (capital of Zabaykalsky Krai) and 5,422 km from Moscow. Chiron is the nearest rural locality.
