= Beregovoy, Zabaykalsky Krai =

Beregovoy Береговой
- Settlement
- Location within Zabaykalsky Krai Location within Russia
- Coordinates: 52°11′N 113°29′E
- Country: Russia
- Region: Zabaykalsky Krai
- District: Chitinsky District
- Time zone: UTC+9:00

Beregovoy (Russian: Береговой) is a rural locality (a settlement) in Chitinsky District, Zabaykalsky Krai, Russia. Population: 351 (2021 census); 331 (2010 census); There are 17 streets in this settlement.

== Geography ==
This rural locality is located 18 km from Chita (the district's administrative centre and capital of Zabaykalsky Krai) and 5,187 km from Moscow. Verkhnyaya Chita is the nearest rural locality.
