= Svetly, Tungokochensky District, Zabaykalsky Krai =

Svetly Светлый
- Settlement
- Location within Zabaykalsky Krai Location within Russia
- Coordinates: 52°25′N 115°24′E
- Country: Russia
- Region: Zabaykalsky Krai
- District: Tungokochensky District
- Time zone: UTC+9:00

Svetly (Russian: Светлый) is a rural locality (a settlement) in Tungokochensky District, Zabaykalsky Krai, Russia. Population: 6 (2021 census); 36 (2010 census); 107 (2002 census); There are 3 streets in this settlement.
