= Klyuchevaya, Zabaykalsky Krai =

Klyuchevaya Ключевая
- Selo
- Location within Zabaykalsky Krai Location within Russia
- Coordinates: 50°00′N 116°00′E
- Country: Russia
- Region: Zabaykalsky Krai
- District: Olovyanninsky District
- Time zone: UTC+9:00

Klyuchevaya (Russian: Ключевая) is a rural locality (a selo) in Olovyanninsky District, Zabaykalsky Krai, Russia. Population: 63 (2021 census); 65 (2010 census); There is 1 street in this selo.
