= Zubarevo, Zabaykalsky Krai =

Zubarevo Зубарево
- Selo
- Location within Zabaykalsky Krai Location within Russia
- Coordinates: 51°47′N 115°16′E
- Country: Russia
- Region: Zabaykalsky Krai
- District: Shilkinsky District
- Time zone: UTC+9:00

Zubarevo (Russian: Зубарево) is a rural locality (a selo) in Shilkinsky District, Zabaykalsky Krai, Russia. Population: 207 (2021 census); 250 (2010 census); There are 3 streets in this selo.

== Geography ==
This rural locality is located 53 km from Shilka (the district's administrative centre), 125 km from Chita (capital of Zabaykalsky Krai) and 5,360 km from Moscow. Unenker is the nearest rural locality.
