= Yelizavetino, Zabaykalsky Krai =

Yelizavetino Елизаветино
- Selo
- Location within Zabaykalsky Krai Location within Russia
- Coordinates: 51°39′N 113°36′E
- Country: Russia
- Region: Zabaykalsky Krai
- District: Chitinsky District
- Time zone: UTC+9:00

Yelizavetino (Russian: Елизаветино) is a rural locality (a selo) in Chitinsky District, Zabaykalsky Krai, Russia. Population: 731 (2021 census); 866 (2010 census); There are 15 streets in this selo.

== Geography ==
This rural locality is located 43 km from Chita (the district's administrative centre and capital of Zabaykalsky Krai) and 5,262 km from Moscow. Verkh-Narym is the nearest rural locality.
