= Bural, Zabaykalsky Krai =

Bural Бурал
- Khutor
- Location within Zabaykalsky Krai Location within Russia
- Coordinates: 50°49′N 113°52′E
- Country: Russia
- Region: Zabaykalsky Krai
- District: Duldurginsky District
- Time zone: UTC+9:00

Bural (Russian: Бурал) is a rural locality (a khutor) in Duldurginsky District, Zabaykalsky Krai, Russia. Population: 8 (2021 census); 9 (2010 census);
