= Verkh-Narym =

Verkh-Narym Верх-Нарым
- Selo
- Location within Zabaykalsky Krai Location within Russia
- Coordinates: 51°32′N 114°23′E
- Country: Russia
- Region: Zabaykalsky Krai
- District: Chitinsky District
- Time zone: UTC+9:00

Verkh-Narym (Russian: Верх-Нарым) is a rural locality (a selo) in Chitinsky District, Zabaykalsky Krai, Russia. Population: 318 (2021 census); 345 (2010 census); There are 2 streets in this selo.

== Geography ==
This rural locality is located 50 km from Chita (the district's administrative centre and capital of Zabaykalsky Krai) and 5,260 km from Moscow. Yelizavetino is the nearest rural locality.
