= Kudecha =

Kudecha Кудеча
- Selo
- Location within Zabaykalsky Krai Location within Russia
- Coordinates: 53°27′N 119°18′E
- Country: Russia
- Region: Zabaykalsky Krai
- District: Mogochinsky District
- Time zone: UTC+9:00

Kudecha (Russian: Кудеча) is a rural locality (a selo) in Mogochinsky District, Zabaykalsky Krai, Russia. Population: 185 (2021 census); 222 (2010 census); 326 (2002 census); There are 4 streets in this selo.

== Geography ==
This rural locality is located 43 km from Mogocha (the district's administrative centre), 416 km from Chita (capital of Zabaykalsky Krai) and 5,413 km from Moscow. Nizhnyaya Davenda is the nearest rural locality.
