= Pravo-Peshkovo =

Pravo-Peshkovo Право-Пешково
- Selo
- Location within Zabaykalsky Krai Location within Russia
- Coordinates: 51°46′N 116°27′E
- Country: Russia
- Region: Zabaykalsky Krai
- District: Nerchinsky District
- Time zone: UTC+9:00

Pravo-Peshkovo (Russian: Право-Пешково) is a rural locality (a selo) in Nerchinsky District, Zabaykalsky Krai, Russia. Population: 140 (2021 census); 142 (2010 census);
