= Kuanda, Zabaykalsky Krai =

Kuanda Куанда
- Settlement
- Location within Zabaykalsky Krai Location within Russia
- Coordinates: 56°19′N 116°04′E
- Country: Russia
- Region: Zabaykalsky Krai
- District: Kalarsky District
- Time zone: UTC+9:00

Kuanda (Russian: Куанда) is a rural locality (a settlement) in Kalarsky District, Zabaykalsky Krai, Russia. Population: 1,394 (2021 census); 1,693 (2010 census); 1,614 (2002 census); There are 40 streets in this settlement.

== Geography ==
This rural locality is located 149 km from Chara (the district's administrative centre), 503 km from Chita (capital of Zabaykalsky Krai) and 4,838 km from Moscow. Dogopchan is the nearest rural locality.
