= Uley, Zabaykalsky Krai =

Uley Улей
- Selo
- Location within Zabaykalsky Krai Location within Russia
- Coordinates: 52°39′N 117°09′E
- Country: Russia
- Region: Zabaykalsky Krai
- District: Chernyshevsky District
- Time zone: UTC+9:00

Uley (Russian: Улей) is a rural locality (a selo) in Chernyshevsky District, Zabaykalsky Krai, Russia. Population: 39 (2010 census); 35 (2002 census); There is 1 street in this selo.

== Geography ==
This rural locality is located 17 km from Chernyshevsk (the district's administrative centre), 256 km from Chita (capital of Zabaykalsky Krai) and 5,377 km from Moscow. Aleur is the nearest rural locality.
