= Kurlych =

Kurlych Курлыч
- Selo
- Location within Zabaykalsky Krai Location within Russia
- Coordinates: 52°22′N 117°14′E
- Country: Russia
- Region: Zabaykalsky Krai
- District: Chernyshevsky District
- Time zone: UTC+9:00

Kurlych (Russian: Курлыч) is a rural locality (a selo) in Chernyshevsky District, Zabaykalsky Krai, Russia. Population: 203 (2021 census); 309 (2010 census); There are 6 streets in this selo.

== Geography ==
This rural locality is located 23 km from Chernyshevsk (the district's administrative centre), 257 km from Chita (capital of Zabaykalsky Krai) and 5,419 km from Moscow. Kulan is the nearest rural locality.
