= Novaya Kuka =

Novaya Kuka Новая Кука
- Selo
- Location within Zabaykalsky Krai Location within Russia
- Coordinates: 51°47′N 113°03′E
- Country: Russia
- Region: Zabaykalsky Krai
- District: Chitinsky District
- Time zone: UTC+9:00

Novaya Kuka (Russian: Новая Кука) is a rural locality (a selo) in Chitinsky District, Zabaykalsky Krai, Russia. Population: 1,513 (2021 census); 1,628 (2010 census); There are 6 streets in this selo.

== Geography ==
This rural locality is located 40 km from Chita (the district's administrative centre and capital of Zabaykalsky Krai) and 5,207 km from Moscow. Zhipkovshchina is the nearest rural locality.
