= Ishaga =

Ishaga Ишага
- Selo
- Location within Zabaykalsky Krai Location within Russia
- Coordinates: 51°28′N 119°58′E
- Country: Russia
- Region: Zabaykalsky Krai
- District: Nerchinsko-Zavodsky District
- Time zone: UTC+9:00

Ishaga (Russian: Ишага) is a rural locality (a selo) in Nerchinsko-Zavodsky District, Zabaykalsky Krai, Russia. Population: 146 (2021 census); 169 (2010 census); 302 (2002 census); There are 5 streets in this selo.

== Geography ==
This rural locality is located 31 km from Nerchinsky Zavod (the district's administrative centre), 452 km from Chita (capital of Zabaykalsky Krai) and 5,723 km from Moscow. Damasovo is the nearest rural locality.
