= Zurun =

Zurun Зурун
- Selo
- Location within Zabaykalsky Krai Location within Russia
- Coordinates: 51°24′N 109°58′E
- Country: Russia
- Region: Zabaykalsky Krai
- District: Khiloksky District
- Time zone: UTC+9:00

Zurun (Russian: Зурун) is a rural locality (a selo) in Khiloksky District, Zabaykalsky Krai, Russia. Population: 261 (2021 census); 275 (2010 census); There are 7 streets in this selo.

== Geography ==
This rural locality is located 34 km from Khilok (the district's administrative centre), 255 km from Chita (capital of Zabaykalsky Krai) and 5,042 km from Moscow. Glinka is the nearest rural locality.
