= Khadakta =

Khadakta Хадакта
- Selo
- Location within Zabaykalsky Krai Location within Russia
- Coordinates: 51°25′N 112°34′E
- Country: Russia
- Region: Zabaykalsky Krai
- District: Ulyotovsky District
- Time zone: UTC+9:00

Khadakta (Russian: Хадакта) is a rural locality (a selo) in Ulyotovsky District, Zabaykalsky Krai, Russia. Population: 814 (2021 census); 872 (2010 census); There are 11 streets in this selo.

== Geography ==
This rural locality is located 10 km from Ulyoty (the district's administrative centre), 93 km from Chita (capital of Zabaykalsky Krai) and 5,219 km from Moscow. Karymka is the nearest rural locality.
