= Novotroitsk, Zabaykalsky Krai =

Novotroitsk Новотроицк
- Selo
- Location within Zabaykalsky Krai Location within Russia
- Coordinates: 51°59′N 114°05′E
- Country: Russia
- Region: Zabaykalsky Krai
- District: Chitinsky District
- Time zone: UTC+9:00

Novotroitsk (Russian: Новотроицк) is a rural locality (a selo) in Chitinsky District, Zabaykalsky Krai, Russia. Population: 679 (2021 census); 779 (2010 census); There are 12 streets in this selo.

== Geography ==
This rural locality is located 41 km from Chita (the district's administrative centre and capital of Zabaykalsky Krai) and 5,254 km from Moscow. Tankha is the nearest rural locality.
