= Bolshaya Tura =

Bolshaya Tura Большая Тура
- Selo
- Location within Zabaykalsky Krai Location within Russia
- Coordinates: 51°37′N 114°05′E
- Country: Russia
- Region: Zabaykalsky Krai
- District: Karymsky District
- Time zone: UTC+9:00

Bolshaya Tura (Russian: Большая Тура) is a rural locality (a selo) in Karymsky District, Zabaykalsky Krai, Russia. Population: 1,692 (2021 census); 1,287 (2010 census); 1,366 (2002 census); There are 9 streets in this selo.

== Geography ==
This rural locality is located 17 km from Karymskoye (the district's administrative centre), 60 km from Chita (capital of Zabaykalsky Krai) and 5,298 km from Moscow. Darasun is the nearest rural locality.
