= Gorekatsan =

Gorekatsan Горекацан
- Selo
- Location within Zabaykalsky Krai Location within Russia
- Coordinates: 51°07′N 111°56′E
- Country: Russia
- Region: Zabaykalsky Krai
- District: Ulyotovsky District
- Time zone: UTC+9:00

Gorekatsan (Russian: Горекацан) is a rural locality (a selo) in Ulyotovsky District, Zabaykalsky Krai, Russia. Population: 412 (2010 census); 464 (2002 census); There are 5 streets in this selo.

== Geography ==
This rural locality is located 47 km from Ulyoty (the district's administrative centre), 149 km from Chita (capital of Zabaykalsky Krai) and 5,213 km from Moscow. Goreka is the nearest rural locality.
