= Soktuy =

Soktuy Соктуй
- Selo
- Location within Zabaykalsky Krai Location within Russia
- Coordinates: 50°15′N 116°35′E
- Country: Russia
- Region: Zabaykalsky Krai
- District: Borzinsky District
- Time zone: UTC+9:00

Soktuy (Russian: Соктуй) is a rural locality (a selo) in Borzinsky District, Zabaykalsky Krai, Russia. Population: 47 (2021 census); 60 (2010 census); There are 2 streets in this selo.
