= Solontsy, Zabaykalsky Krai =

Solontsy Солонцы
- Selo
- Location within Zabaykalsky Krai Location within Russia
- Coordinates: 51°27′N 118°51′E
- Country: Russia
- Region: Zabaykalsky Krai
- District: Gazimuro-Zavodsky District
- Time zone: UTC+9:00

Solontsy (Russian: Солонцы) is a rural locality (a selo) in Gazimuro-Zavodsky District, Zabaykalsky Krai, Russia. Population: 10 (2021 census); 31 (2010 census); 66 (2002 census);

== Geography ==
This rural locality is located 37 km from Gazimursky Zavod (the district's administrative centre), 377 km from Chita (capital of Zabaykalsky Krai) and 5,649 km from Moscow. Solonechny is the nearest rural locality.
