= Novoivanovka, Baleysky District, Zabaykalsky Krai =

Novoivanovka Новоивановка
- Selo
- Location within Zabaykalsky Krai Location within Russia
- Coordinates: 51°29′N 116°24′E
- Country: Russia
- Region: Zabaykalsky Krai
- District: Baleysky District
- Time zone: UTC+9:00

Novoivanovka (Russian: Новоивановка) is a rural locality (a selo) in Baleysky District, Zabaykalsky Krai, Russia. Population: 130 (2021 census); 197 (2010 census); 247 (2002 census); There are 7 streets in this selo.

== Geography ==
This rural locality is located 18 km from Baley (the district's administrative centre), 211 km from Chita (capital of Zabaykalsky Krai) and 5,476 km from Moscow. Sarbaktuy is the nearest rural locality.
