= Verkh-Chita =

Verkh-Chita Верх-Чита
- Selo
- Location within Zabaykalsky Krai Location within Russia
- Coordinates: 52°13′N 113°30′E
- Country: Russia
- Region: Zabaykalsky Krai
- District: Chitinsky District
- Time zone: UTC+9:00

Verkh-Chita (Russian: Верх-Чита) is a rural locality (a selo) in Chitinsky District, Zabaykalsky Krai, Russia. Population: 1,641 (2021 census); 1,694 (2010 census); 1,687 (2002 census); There are 51 streets in this selo.

== Geography ==
This rural locality is located 21 km from Chita (the district's administrative centre and capital of Zabaykalsky Krai) and 5,184 km from Moscow. Karpovka is the nearest rural locality.
