= Bolshoy Tontoy =

Bolshoy Tontoy Большой Тонтой
- Selo
- Location within Zabaykalsky Krai Location within Russia
- Coordinates: 51°49′N 117°45′E
- Country: Russia
- Region: Zabaykalsky Krai
- District: Shelopuginsky District
- Time zone: UTC+9:00

Bolshoy Tontoy (Russian: Большой Тонтой) is a rural locality (a selo) in Shelopuginsky District, Zabaykalsky Krai, Russia. Population: 133 (2021 census); 192 (2010 census); There are 3 streets in this selo.

== Geography ==
This rural locality is located 24 km from Shelopugino (the district's administrative centre), 294 km from Chita (capital of Zabaykalsky Krai) and 5,525 km from Moscow. Maly Tontoy is the nearest rural locality.
