= Rucheyki, Zabaykalsky Krai =

Rucheyki Ручейки
- Settlement
- Location within Zabaykalsky Krai Location within Russia
- Coordinates: 52°16′N 113°32′E
- Country: Russia
- Region: Zabaykalsky Krai
- District: Chitinsky District
- Time zone: UTC+9:00

Rucheyki (Russian: Ручейки) is a rural locality (a settlement) in Chitinsky District, Zabaykalsky Krai, Russia. Population: 45 (2021 census); 42 (2010 census); There are 2 streets in this settlement.

== Geography ==
This rural locality is located 27 km from Chita (the district's administrative centre and capital of Zabaykalsky Krai) and 5,180 km from Moscow. Shishkino is the nearest rural locality.
