= Nomokonovo =

Nomokonovo Номоконово
- Selo
- Location within Zabaykalsky Krai Location within Russia
- Coordinates: 51°38′N 115°29′E
- Country: Russia
- Region: Zabaykalsky Krai
- District: Shilkinsky District
- Time zone: UTC+9:00

Nomokonovo (Russian: Номоконово) is a rural locality (a selo) in Shilkinsky District, Zabaykalsky Krai, Russia. Population: 393 (2021 census); 489 (2010 census); There are 6 streets in this selo.

== Geography ==
This rural locality is located 44 km from Shilka (the district's administrative centre), 145 km from Chita (capital of Zabaykalsky Krai) and 5,394 km from Moscow. Pervomaysky is the nearest rural locality.
