= Ishikan =

Ishikan Ишикан
- Selo
- Location within Zabaykalsky Krai Location within Russia
- Coordinates: 51°58′N 117°33′E
- Country: Russia
- Region: Zabaykalsky Krai
- District: Shelopuginsky District
- Time zone: UTC+9:00

Ishikan (Russian: Ишикан) is a rural locality (a selo) in Shelopuginsky District, Zabaykalsky Krai, Russia. Population: 94 (2021 census); 112 (2010 census); There are 2 streets in this selo.

== Geography ==
This rural locality is located 35 km from Shelopugino (the district's administrative centre), 278 km from Chita (capital of Zabaykalsky Krai) and 5,493 km from Moscow. Mironovo is the nearest rural locality.
