= Bayn-Tsagan =

Selo in Zabaykalsky Krai, Russia

Bayn-Tsagan Байн-Цаган
- Selo
- Location within Zabaykalsky Krai Location within Russia
- Coordinates: 50°18′N 115°05′E
- Country: Russia
- Region: Zabaykalsky Krai
- District: Ononsky District
- Time zone: UTC+9:00

Bayn-Tsagan (Russian: Байн-Цаган) is a rural locality (a selo) in Ononsky District, Zabaykalsky Krai, Russia. Population: 51 (2021 census); 53 (2010 census); There is 1 street in this selo.

== Geography ==
This rural locality is located 22 km from Nizhny Tsasuchey (the district's administrative centre), 222 km from Chita (capital of Zabaykalsky Krai) and 5,535 km from Moscow. Arshantuy is the nearest rural locality.
