= Burgen, Zabaykalsky Krai =

Burgen Бургень
- Selo
- Location within Zabaykalsky Krai Location within Russia
- Coordinates: 52°25′N 113°46′E
- Country: Russia
- Region: Zabaykalsky Krai
- District: Chitinsky District
- Time zone: UTC+9:00

Burgen (Russian: Бургень) is a rural locality (a selo) in Chitinsky District, Zabaykalsky Krai, Russia. Population: 630 (2021 census); 692 (2010 census); There are 8 streets in this selo.

== Geography ==
This rural locality is located 47 km from Chita (the district's administrative centre and capital of Zabaykalsky Krai) and 5,178 km from Moscow. Podvolok is the nearest rural locality.
