= Shishkino, Zabaykalsky Krai =

Shishkino Шишкино
- Selo
- Location within Zabaykalsky Krai Location within Russia
- Coordinates: 52°18′N 113°34′E
- Country: Russia
- Region: Zabaykalsky Krai
- District: Chitinsky District
- Time zone: UTC+9:00

Shishkino (Russian: Шишкино) is a rural locality (a selo) in Chitinsky District, Zabaykalsky Krai, Russia. Population: 1,578 (2021 census); 1,588 (2010 census); There are 38 streets in this selo.

== Geography ==
This rural locality is located 31 km from Chita (the district's administrative centre and capital of Zabaykalsky Krai) and 5,179 km from Moscow. Rucheyki is the nearest rural locality.
