= Pravye Kumaki =

Pravye Kumaki Правые Кумаки
- Selo
- Location within Zabaykalsky Krai Location within Russia
- Coordinates: 52°04′N 116°21′E
- Country: Russia
- Region: Zabaykalsky Krai
- District: Nerchinsky District
- Time zone: UTC+9:00

Pravye Kumaki (Russian: Правые Кумаки) is a rural locality (a selo) in Nerchinsky District, Zabaykalsky Krai, Russia. Population: 138 (2021 census); 174 (2010 census); 191 (2002 census); There is 1 street in this selo.
