= Amodovo =

Amodovo Амодово
- Selo
- Location within Zabaykalsky Krai Location within Russia
- Coordinates: 51°52′N 113°12′E
- Country: Russia
- Region: Zabaykalsky Krai
- District: Chitinsky District
- Time zone: UTC+9:00

Amodovo (Russian: Амодово) is a rural locality (a selo) in Chitinsky District, Zabaykalsky Krai, Russia. Population: 86 (2021 census); 82 (2010 census); There are 3 streets in this selo.

== Geography ==
This rural locality is located 27 km from Chita (the district's administrative centre and capital of Zabaykalsky Krai) and 5,207 km from Moscow. Sivyakovo is the nearest rural locality.
