= Sbega =

Sbega Сбега
- Settlement
- Location within Zabaykalsky Krai Location within Russia
- Coordinates: 53°18′N 18°30′E
- Country: Russia
- Region: Zabaykalsky Krai
- District: Mogochinsky District
- Time zone: UTC+9:00

Sbega (Russian: Сбега) is a rural locality (a settlement) in Mogochinsky District, Zabaykalsky Krai, Russia. Population: 1,563 (2021 census); 1,712 (2010 census); 1,532 (2002 census); There are 21 streets in this settlement.

== Geography ==
This rural locality is located 96 km from Mogocha (the district's administrative centre), 362 km from Chita (capital of Zabaykalsky Krai) and 5,381 km from Moscow. Dzhelonda is the nearest rural locality.
