= Urguchan =

Urguchan Ургучан
- Selo
- Location within Zabaykalsky Krai Location within Russia
- Coordinates: 51°45′N 116°41′E
- Country: Russia
- Region: Zabaykalsky Krai
- District: Baleysky District
- Time zone: UTC+9:00

Urguchan (Russian: Ургучан) is a rural locality (a selo) in Baleysky District, Zabaykalsky Krai, Russia. Population: 126 (2010 census); 121 (2002 census); There are 4 streets in this selo.
