= Argunsk =

Aknada Акнада
- Selo
- Location within Zabaykalsky Krai Location within Russia
- Coordinates: 51°34′N 120°01′E
- Country: Russia
- Region: Zabaykalsky Krai
- District: Nerchinsko-Zavodsky District
- Time zone: UTC+9:00

Argunsk (Russian: Акнада) is a rural locality (a selo) in Nerchinsko-Zavodsky District, Zabaykalsky Krai, Russia. Population: 416 (2021 census); 496 (2010 census); 522 (2002 census); There are 10 streets in this selo.

== Geography ==
This rural locality is located 41 km from Nerchinsky Zavod (the district's administrative centre), 453 km from Chita (capital of Zabaykalsky Krai) and 5,713 km from Moscow. Damasovo is the nearest rural locality.
