= Arenda, Zabaykalsky Krai =

Arenda Аренда
- Selo
- Location within Zabaykalsky Krai Location within Russia
- Coordinates: 51°17′N 116°14′E
- Country: Russia
- Region: Zabaykalsky Krai
- District: Olovyanninsky District
- Time zone: UTC+9:00

Arenda (Russian: Аренда) is a rural locality (a selo) in Olovyanninsky District, Zabaykalsky Krai, Russia. Population: 155 (2021 census); 213 (2010 census); 316 (2002 census); There are 6 streets in this selo.
