= Uktycha =

Uktycha Уктыча
- Selo
- Location within Zabaykalsky Krai Location within Russia
- Coordinates: 52°19′N 118°16′E
- Country: Russia
- Region: Zabaykalsky Krai
- District: Sretensky District
- Time zone: UTC+9:00

Uktycha (Russian: Уктыча) is a rural locality (a selo) in Sretensky District, Zabaykalsky Krai, Russia. Population: 37 (2021 census); 68 (2010 census); There is 1 street in this selo.

== Geography ==
This rural locality is located 39 km from Sretensk (the district's administrative centre), 326 km from Chita (capital of Zabaykalsky Krai) and 5,494 km from Moscow. Firsovo is the nearest rural locality.
