= Yolkino, Zabaykalsky Krai =

Yolkino Ёлкино
- Selo
- Location within Zabaykalsky Krai Location within Russia
- Coordinates: 51°41′N 116°52′E
- Country: Russia
- Region: Zabaykalsky Krai
- District: Baleysky District
- Time zone: UTC+9:00

Yolkino (Russian: Ёлкино) is a rural locality (a selo) in Baleysky District, Zabaykalsky Krai, Russia. Population: 96 (2021 census); 120 (2010 census); 148 (2002 census); There are 2 streets in this selo.

== Geography ==
This rural locality is located 21 km from Baley (the district's administrative centre), 236 km from Chita (capital of Zabaykalsky Krai) and 5,482 km from Moscow. Unda is the nearest rural locality.
