= Balzoy =

Balzoy Бальзой
- Selo
- Location within Zabaykalsky Krai Location within Russia
- Coordinates: 51°21′N 112°21′E
- Country: Russia
- Region: Zabaykalsky Krai
- District: Ulyotovsky District
- Time zone: UTC+9:00

Balzoy (Russian: Бальзой) is a rural locality (a selo) in Ulyotovsky District, Zabaykalsky Krai, Russia. Population: 505 (2010 census); 640 (2002 census); There are 5 streets in this selo.

== Geography ==
This rural locality is located 8 km from Ulyoty (the district's administrative centre), 109 km from Chita (capital of Zabaykalsky Krai) and 5,213 km from Moscow. Ulyoty is the nearest rural locality.
