= Yuzhnoye, Zabaykalsky Krai =

Yuzhnoye Южное
- Selo
- Location within Zabaykalsky Krai Location within Russia
- Coordinates: 50°14′N 116°34′E
- Country: Russia
- Region: Zabaykalsky Krai
- District: Borzinsky District
- Time zone: UTC+9:00

Yuzhnoye (Russian: Южное) is a rural locality (a selo) in Borzinsky District, Zabaykalsky Krai, Russia. Population: 467 (2021 census); 629 (2010 census); There are 8 streets in this selo.
