= Verkhny Shergoldzhin =

Verkhny Shergoldzhin Верхний Шергольджин
- Selo
- Location within Zabaykalsky Krai Location within Russia
- Coordinates: 50°11′N 108°19′E
- Country: Russia
- Region: Zabaykalsky Krai
- District: Krasnochikoysky District
- Time zone: UTC+9:00

Verkhny Shergoldzhin (Russian: Верхний Шергольджин) is a rural locality (a selo) in Krasnochikoysky District, Zabaykalsky Krai, Russia. Population: 298 (2021 census); 365 (2010 census); 460 (2002 census); There are 4 streets in this selo.

== Geography ==
This rural locality is located 36 km from Krasny Chikoy (the district's administrative centre), 422 km from Chita (capital of Zabaykalsky Krai) and 5,072 km from Moscow. Sredny Shergoldzhin is the nearest rural locality.
