= Tut-Khaltuy =

Tut-Khaltuy Тут-Халтуй
- Selo
- Location within Zabaykalsky Krai Location within Russia
- Coordinates: 50°27′N 114°10′E
- Country: Russia
- Region: Zabaykalsky Krai
- District: Ononsky District
- Time zone: UTC+9:00

Tut-Khaltuy (Russian: Тут-Халтуй) is a rural locality (a selo) in Ononsky District, Zabaykalsky Krai, Russia. Population: 383 (2021 census); 488 (2010 census); 582 (2002 census); There are 4 streets in this selo.

== Geography ==
This rural locality is located 68 km from Nizhny Tsasuchey (the district's administrative centre), 182 km from Chita (capital of Zabaykalsky Krai) and 5,451 km from Moscow. Tokchin is the nearest rural locality.
