= Kolokolny =

Kolokolny Колокольный
- Settlement
- Location within Zabaykalsky Krai Location within Russia
- Coordinates: 53°56′N 121°08′E
- Country: Russia
- Region: Zabaykalsky Krai
- District: Mogochinsky District
- Time zone: UTC+9:00

Kolokolny (Russian: Колокольный) is a rural locality (a settlement) in Mogochinsky District, Zabaykalsky Krai, Russia. Population: 9 (2010 census); 18 (2002 census);

== Geography ==
This rural locality is located 93 km from Mogocha (the district's administrative centre), 543 km from Chita (capital of Zabaykalsky Krai) and 5,470 km from Moscow. Potayka is the nearest rural locality.
