= Turga =

Turga Турга
- Selo
- Location within Zabaykalsky Krai Location within Russia
- Coordinates: 51°03′N 116°37′E
- Country: Russia
- Region: Zabaykalsky Krai
- District: Olovyanninsky District
- Time zone: UTC+9:00

Turga (Russian: Турга) is a rural locality (a selo) in Olovyanninsky District, Zabaykalsky Krai, Russia. Population: 546 (2021 census); 694 (2010 census); There are 5 streets in this selo.

== Geography ==
This rural locality is located 75 km from Olovyannaya (the district's administrative centre), 245 km from Chita (capital of Zabaykalsky Krai) and 5,548 km from Moscow. Kalanguy is the nearest rural locality.
