= Topolyovka, Zabaykalsky Krai =

Topolyovka Тополёвка
- Settlement
- Location within Zabaykalsky Krai Location within Russia
- Coordinates: 50°54′N 115°36′E
- Country: Russia
- Region: Zabaykalsky Krai
- District: Olovyanninsky District
- Time zone: UTC+9:00

Topolyovka (Russian: Тополёвка) is a rural locality (a settlement) in Olovyanninsky District, Zabaykalsky Krai, Russia. Population: 143 (2021 census); 202 (2010 census); There is 1 street in this settlement.

== Geography ==
This rural locality is located 5 km from Olovyannaya (the district's administrative centre), 194 km from Chita (capital of Zabaykalsky Krai) and 5,495 km from Moscow. Olovyannaya is the nearest rural locality.
