= Mirsanovo =

Mirsanovo Мирсаново
- Selo
- Location within Zabaykalsky Krai Location within Russia
- Coordinates: 51°53′N 116°09′E
- Country: Russia
- Region: Zabaykalsky Krai
- District: Shilkinsky District
- Time zone: UTC+9:00

Mirsanovo (Russian: Мирсаново) is a rural locality (a selo) in Shilkinsky District, Zabaykalsky Krai, Russia. Population: 578 (2021 census); 643 (2010 census); There are 5 streets in this selo.

== Geography ==
This rural locality is located 9 km from Shilka (the district's administrative centre), 183 km from Chita (capital of Zabaykalsky Krai) and 5,407 km from Moscow. Kholbon is the nearest rural locality.
