= Verkhny Umykay =

Verkhny Umykay Верхний Умыкэй
- Selo
- Location within Zabaykalsky Krai Location within Russia
- Coordinates: 52°08′N 116°32′E
- Country: Russia
- Region: Zabaykalsky Krai
- District: Nerchinsky District
- Time zone: UTC+9:00

Verkhny Umykay (Russian: Верхний Умыкэй) is a rural locality (a selo) in Nerchinsky District, Zabaykalsky Krai, Russia. Population: 198 (2021 census); 237 (2010 census); 262 (2002 census); There are 2 streets in this selo.
