= Talman-Borzya =

Talman-Borzya Талман-Борзя
- Selo
- Location within Zabaykalsky Krai Location within Russia
- Coordinates: 50°33′N 118°50′E
- Country: Russia
- Region: Zabaykalsky Krai
- District: Priargunsky District
- Time zone: UTC+9:00

Talman-Borzya (Russian: Талман-Борзя) is a rural locality (a selo) in Priargunsky District, Zabaykalsky Krai, Russia. Population: 340 (2021 census); 414 (2010 census); 502 (2002 census); There are 9 streets in this selo.

== Geography ==
This rural locality is located 28 km from Priargunsk (the district's administrative centre), 411 km from Chita (capital of Zabaykalsky Krai) and 5,767 km from Moscow. Pogranichny is the nearest rural locality.
