= Undinskiye Kavykuchi =

Undinskiye Kavykuchi Ундинские Кавыкучи
- Selo
- Location within Zabaykalsky Krai Location within Russia
- Coordinates: 51°26′N 117°41′E
- Country: Russia
- Region: Zabaykalsky Krai
- District: Shelopuginsky District
- Time zone: UTC+9:00

Undinskiye Kavykuchi (Russian: Ундинские Кавыкучи) is a rural locality (a selo) in Shelopuginsky District, Zabaykalsky Krai, Russia. Population: 63 (2010 census); 64 (2002 census); There is 1 street in this selo.

== Geography ==
This rural locality is located 25 km from Shelopugino (the district's administrative centre), 298 km from Chita (capital of Zabaykalsky Krai) and 5,571 km from Moscow. Sivachi is the nearest rural locality.
