= Zabaykalsky, Zabaykalsky Krai =

Zabaykalsky Забайкальский
- Settlement
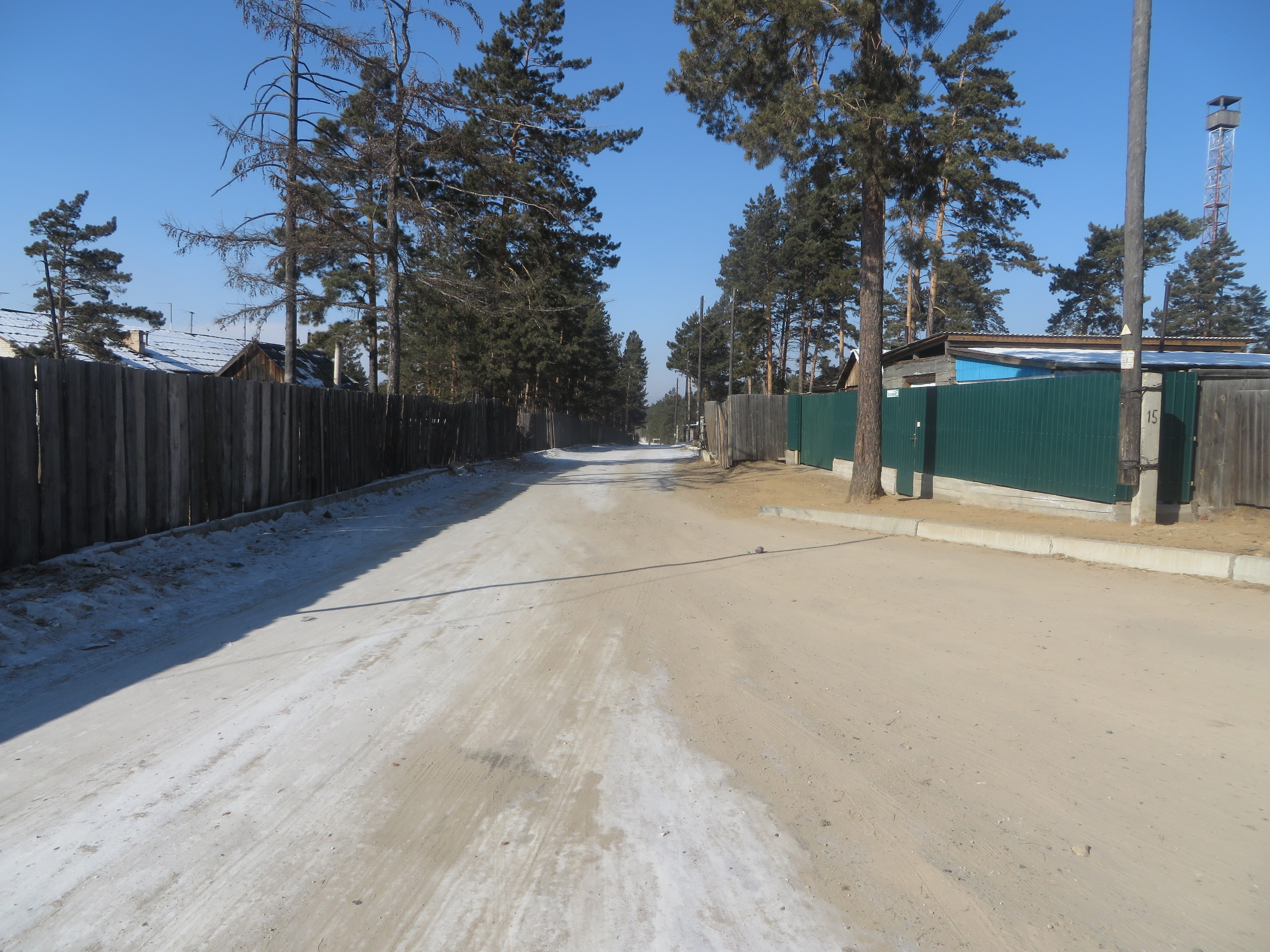

- Location within Zabaykalsky Krai Location within Russia
- Coordinates: 52°08′N 113°35′E
- Country: Russia
- Region: Zabaykalsky Krai
- District: Chitinsky District
- Time zone: UTC+9:00

Zabaykalsky (Russian: Забайкальский) is a rural locality (a settlement) in Chitinsky District, Zabaykalsky Krai, Russia. Population: 240 (2021 census); 280 (2010 census); There are 23 streets in this settlement.

== Geography ==
This rural locality is located 14 km from Chita (the district's administrative centre and capital of Zabaykalsky Krai) and 5,201 km from Moscow. Smolenka is the nearest rural locality.
