= Kokuy-Komogortsevo =

Kokuy-Komogortsevo Кокуй-Комогорцево
- Selo
- Location within Zabaykalsky Krai Location within Russia
- Coordinates: 51°56′N 115°51′E
- Country: Russia
- Region: Zabaykalsky Krai
- District: Shilkinsky District
- Time zone: UTC+9:00

Kokuy-Komogortsevo (Russian: Кокуй-Комогорцево) is a rural locality (a selo) in Shilkinsky District, Zabaykalsky Krai, Russia. Population: 125 (2010 census); 178 (2002 census); There are 4 streets in this selo.

== Geography ==
This rural locality is located 15 km from Shilka (the district's administrative centre), 162 km from Chita (capital of Zabaykalsky Krai) and 5,381 km from Moscow. Bogomyagkovo is the nearest rural locality.
