= Chindaley =

Chindaley Чиндалей
- Selo
- Location within Zabaykalsky Krai Location within Russia
- Coordinates: 50°34′N 113°53′E
- Country: Russia
- Region: Zabaykalsky Krai
- District: Duldurginsky District
- Time zone: UTC+9:00

Chindaley (Russian: Чиндалей) is a rural locality (a selo) in Duldurginsky District, Zabaykalsky Krai, Russia. Population: 900 (2021 census); 1,005 (2010 census); 1,063 (2002 census); There are 12 streets in this selo.

== Geography ==
This rural locality is located 24 km from Duldurga (the district's administrative centre), 165 km from Chita (capital of Zabaykalsky Krai) and 5,417 km from Moscow. Kuranzha is the nearest rural locality.
