= Maly Tontoy =

Maly Tontoy Малый Тонтой
- Selo
- Location within Zabaykalsky Krai Location within Russia
- Coordinates: 51°50′N 117°47′E
- Country: Russia
- Region: Zabaykalsky Krai
- District: Shelopuginsky District
- Time zone: UTC+9:00

Maly Tontoy (Russian: Малый Тонтой) is a rural locality (a selo) in Shelopuginsky District, Zabaykalsky Krai, Russia. Population: 180 (2021 census); 226 (2010 census); There are 6 streets in this selo.

== Geography ==
This rural locality is located 26 km from Shelopugino (the district's administrative centre), 296 km from Chita (capital of Zabaykalsky Krai) and 5,526 km from Moscow. Bolshoy Tontoy is the nearest rural locality.
