= Ugdan =

Ugdan Угдан
- Selo
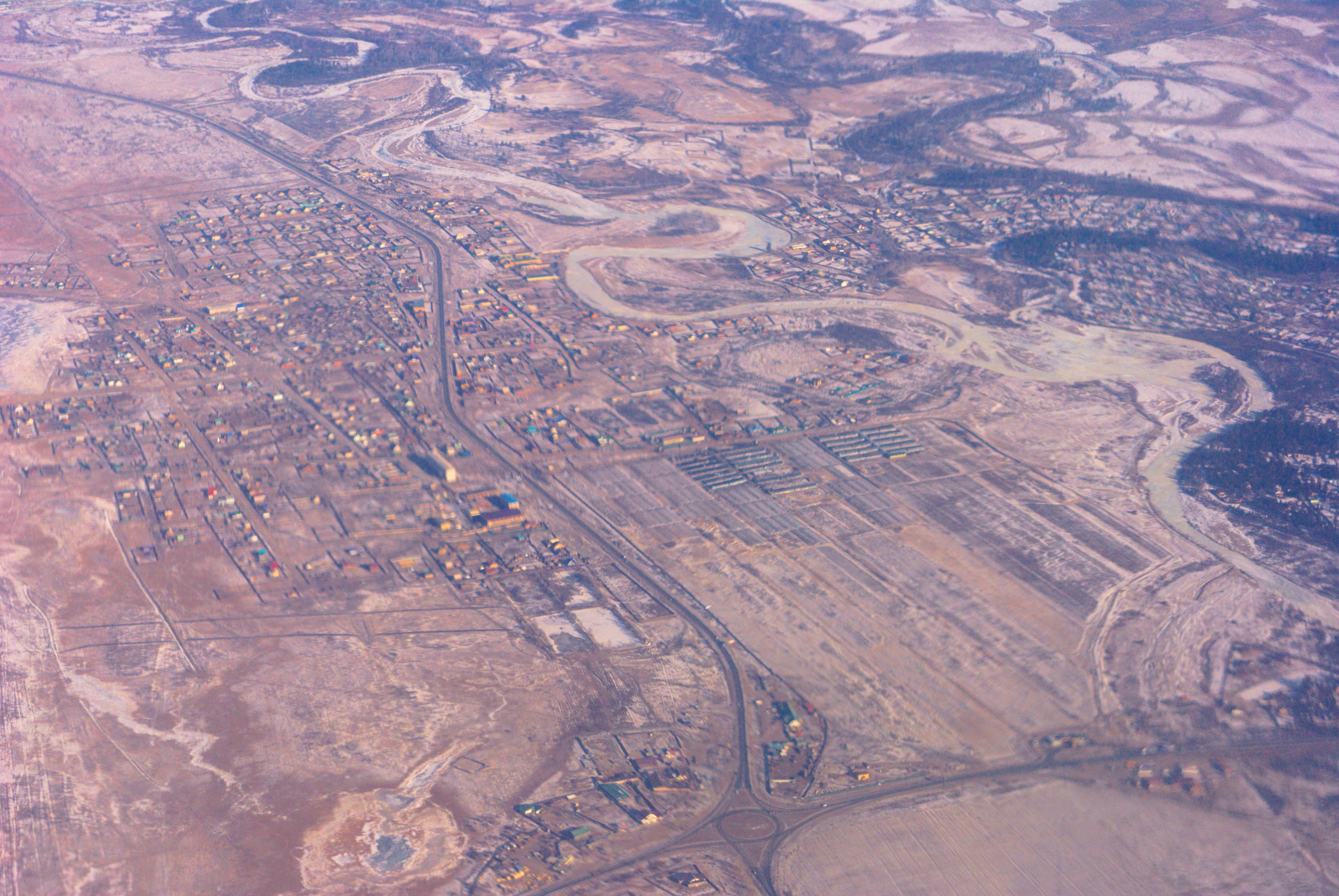

- Location within Zabaykalsky Krai Location within Russia
- Coordinates: 52°09′N 113°27′E
- Country: Russia
- Region: Zabaykalsky Krai
- District: Chitinsky District
- Time zone: UTC+9:00

Ugdan (Russian: Угдан) is a rural locality (a selo) in Chitinsky District, Zabaykalsky Krai, Russia. Population: 2,008 (2021 census); 1,255 (2010 census); There are 62 streets in this selo.

== Geography ==
This rural locality is located 14 km from Chita (the district's administrative centre and capital of Zabaykalsky Krai) and 5,189 km from Moscow. Smolenka is the nearest rural locality.
