= Ingoda, Zabaykalsky Krai =

Ingoda Ингода
- Settlement
- Location within Zabaykalsky Krai Location within Russia
- Coordinates: 51°51′N 113°06′E
- Country: Russia
- Region: Zabaykalsky Krai
- District: Chitinsky District
- Time zone: UTC+9:00

Ingoda (Russian: Ингода) is a rural locality (a settlement) in Chitinsky District, Zabaykalsky Krai, Russia. Population: 944 (2021 census); 1,004 (2010 census); There are 23 streets in this settlement.

== Geography ==
This rural locality is located 34 km from Chita (the district's administrative centre and capital of Zabaykalsky Krai) and 5,203 km from Moscow. Domna is the nearest rural locality.
