= Sypchegur =

Sypchegur Сыпчегур
- Selo
- Location within Zabaykalsky Krai Location within Russia
- Coordinates: 51°21′N 113°26′E
- Country: Russia
- Region: Zabaykalsky Krai
- District: Chitinsky District
- Time zone: UTC+9:00

Sypchegur (Russian: Сыпчегур) is a rural locality (a selo) in Chitinsky District, Zabaykalsky Krai, Russia. Population: 156 (2021 census); 218 (2010 census); There are 7 streets in this selo.

== Geography ==
This rural locality is located 76 km from Chita (the district's administrative centre and capital of Zabaykalsky Krai) and 5,289 km from Moscow. Olenguy is the nearest rural locality.
