= Chernovo, Zabaykalsky Krai =

Chernovo Черново
- Selo
- Location within Zabaykalsky Krai Location within Russia
- Coordinates: 51°57′N 113°14′E
- Country: Russia
- Region: Zabaykalsky Krai
- District: Chitinsky District
- Time zone: UTC+9:00

Chernovo (Russian: Черново) is a rural locality (a selo) in Chitinsky District, Zabaykalsky Krai, Russia. Population: 272 (2021 census); 277 (2010 census); There are 3 streets in this selo.

== Geography ==
This rural locality is located 19 km from Chita (the district's administrative centre and capital of Zabaykalsky Krai) and 5,200 km from Moscow. Kolochnoye 1-ye is the nearest rural locality.
