= Utan, Zabaykalsky Krai =

Utan Утан
- Selo
- Location within Zabaykalsky Krai Location within Russia
- Coordinates: 52°34′N 116°58′E
- Country: Russia
- Region: Zabaykalsky Krai
- District: Chernyshevsky District
- Time zone: UTC+9:00

Utan (Russian: Утан) is a rural locality (a selo) in Chernyshevsky District, Zabaykalsky Krai, Russia. Population: 1,417 (2021 census); 1,641 (2010 census); 1,703 (2002 census); There are 17 streets in this selo.

== Geography ==
This rural locality is located 6 km from Chernyshevsk (the district's administrative centre), 243 km from Chita (capital of Zabaykalsky Krai) and 5,375 km from Moscow. Aleur is the nearest rural locality.
