= Ortuy =

Ortuy Ортуй
- Selo
- Location within Zabaykalsky Krai Location within Russia
- Coordinates: 50°48′N 115°38′E
- Country: Russia
- Region: Zabaykalsky Krai
- District: Mogoytuysky District
- Time zone: UTC+9:00

Ortuy (Russian: Ортуй) is a rural locality (a selo) in Mogoytuysky District, Zabaykalsky Krai, Russia. Population: 825 (2021 census); 1,020 (2010 census); 1,166 (2002 census); There are 16 streets in this selo.

== Geography ==
This rural locality is located 72 km from Mogoytuy (the district's administrative centre), 202 km from Chita (capital of Zabaykalsky Krai) and 5,509 km from Moscow. Topolevka is the nearest rural locality.
