= Bishigino =

Bishigino Бишигино
- Selo
- Location within Zabaykalsky Krai Location within Russia
- Coordinates: 51°51′N 116°26′E
- Country: Russia
- Region: Zabaykalsky Krai
- District: Nerchinsky District
- Time zone: UTC+9:00

Bishigino (Russian: Бишигино) is a rural locality (a selo) in Nerchinsky District, Zabaykalsky Krai, Russia. Population: 341 (2021 census); 391 (2010 census); 443 (2002 census); There are 3 streets in this selo.

== Geography ==
This rural locality is located 17 km from Nerchinsk (the district's administrative centre), 203 km from Chita (capital of Zabaykalsky Krai) and 5,431 km from Moscow. Peshkovo is the nearest rural locality.
