= Karpovka, Zabaykalsky Krai =

Karpovka Карповка
- Selo
- Location within Zabaykalsky Krai Location within Russia
- Coordinates: 52°12′N 113°32′E
- Country: Russia
- Region: Zabaykalsky Krai
- District: Chitinsky District
- Time zone: UTC+9:00

Karpovka (Russian: Карповка) is a rural locality (a selo) in Chitinsky District, Zabaykalsky Krai, Russia. Population: 636 (2021 census); 545 (2010 census); There are 33 streets in this selo.

== Geography ==
This rural locality is located 20 km from Chita (the district's administrative centre and capital of Zabaykalsky Krai) and 5,188 km from Moscow. Verkhnyaya Chita is the nearest rural locality.
