= Barakhoyevo =

Barakhoyevo Барахоево
- Selo
- Location within Zabaykalsky Krai Location within Russia
- Coordinates: 50°25′N 108°54′E
- Country: Russia
- Region: Zabaykalsky Krai
- District: Krasnochikoysky District
- Time zone: UTC+9:00

Barakhoyevo (Russian: Барахоево) is a rural locality (a selo) in Krasnochikoysky District, Zabaykalsky Krai, Russia. Population: 513 (2021 census); 554 (2010 census); 617 (2002 census); There are 3 streets in this selo.

== Geography ==
This rural locality is located 13 km from Krasny Chikoy (the district's administrative centre), 371 km from Chita (capital of Zabaykalsky Krai) and 5,085 km from Moscow.
