= Khilogoson =

Khilogoson Хилогосон
- Selo
- Location within Zabaykalsky Krai Location within Russia
- Coordinates: 51°09′N 110°38′E
- Country: Russia
- Region: Zabaykalsky Krai
- District: Khiloksky District
- Time zone: UTC+9:00

Khilogoson (Russian: Хилогосон) is a rural locality (a selo) in Khiloksky District, Zabaykalsky Krai, Russia. Population: 176 (2021 census); 206 (2010 census); There are 4 streets in this selo.

== Geography ==
This rural locality is located 27 km from Khilok (the district's administrative centre), 222 km from Chita (capital of Zabaykalsky Krai) and 5,119 km from Moscow. Ulyastuy is the nearest rural locality.
