= Shebartuy 2-y =

Shebartuy 2-y Шебартуй 2-й
- Selo
- Location within Zabaykalsky Krai Location within Russia
- Coordinates: 51°01′N 111°23′E
- Country: Russia
- Region: Zabaykalsky Krai
- District: Ulyotovsky District
- Time zone: UTC+9:00

Shebartuy 2-y (Russian: Шебартуй 2-й) is a rural locality (a selo) in Ulyotovsky District, Zabaykalsky Krai, Russia. Population: 155 (2010 census); 229 (2002 census); There is 1 street in this selo.

== Geography ==
This rural locality is located 85 km from Ulyoty (the district's administrative centre), 185 km from Chita (capital of Zabaykalsky Krai) and 5,185 km from Moscow. Novosaliya is the nearest rural locality.
