= Staraya Zardama =

Staraya Zardama Старая Зардама
- Selo
- Location within Zabaykalsky Krai Location within Russia
- Coordinates: 50°45′N 108°10′E
- Country: Russia
- Region: Zabaykalsky Krai
- District: Petrovsk-Zabaykalsky District
- Time zone: UTC+9:00

Staraya Zardama (Russian: Старая Зардама) is a rural locality (a selo) in Petrovsk-Zabaykalsky District, Zabaykalsky Krai, Russia. Population: 5 (2010 census); 2 (2002 census); There is 1 street in this selo.

== Geography ==
This rural locality is located 75 km from Petrovsk-Zabaykalsky (the district's administrative centre), 400 km from Chita (capital of Zabaykalsky Krai) and 4,995 km from Moscow. Novaya Zardama is the nearest rural locality.
