= Akuray =

Akuray Акурай
- Selo
- Location within Zabaykalsky Krai Location within Russia
- Coordinates: 50°45′N 117°09′E
- Country: Russia
- Region: Zabaykalsky Krai
- District: Borzinsky District
- Time zone: UTC+9:00

Akuray (Russian: Акурай) is a rural locality (a selo) in Borzinsky District, Zabaykalsky Krai, Russia. Population: 276 (2021 census); 327 (2010 census); 550 (2002 census); There are 7 streets in this selo.

== Geography ==
This rural locality is located 61 km from Borzya (the district's administrative centre), 294 km from Chita (capital of Zabaykalsky Krai) and 5,622 km from Moscow. Shonoktuy is the nearest rural locality.
