= Stary Chindant =

Stary Chindant Старый Чиндант
- Selo
- Location within Zabaykalsky Krai Location within Russia
- Coordinates: 50°33′N 115°34′E
- Country: Russia
- Region: Zabaykalsky Krai
- District: Ononsky District
- Time zone: UTC+9:00

Stary Chindant (Russian: Старый Чиндант) is a rural locality (a selo) in Ononsky District, Zabaykalsky Krai, Russia. Population: 98 (2021 census); 107 (2010 census); There are 3 streets in this selo.

== Geography ==
This rural locality is located 32 km from Nizhny Tsasuchey (the district's administrative centre), 219 km from Chita (capital of Zabaykalsky Krai) and 5,536 km from Moscow. Ust-Borzya is the nearest rural locality.
