= Ablatukan =

Ablatukan Аблатукан
- Selo
- Location within Zabaykalsky Krai Location within Russia
- Coordinates: 51°14′N 112°07′E
- Country: Russia
- Region: Zabaykalsky Krai
- District: Ulyotovsky District
- Time zone: UTC+9:00

Ablatukan (Russian: Аблатукан) is a rural locality (a selo) in Ulyotovsky District, Zabaykalsky Krai, Russia. Population: 134 (2010 census); 186 (2002 census); There are 2 streets in this selo.

== Geography ==
This rural locality is located 28 km from Ulyoty (the district's administrative centre), 130 km from Chita (capital of Zabaykalsky Krai) and 5,210 km from Moscow. Ablatuysky Bor is the nearest rural locality.
