= Novoilyinsk, Zabaykalsky Krai =

Novoilyinsk Новоильинск
- Selo
- Location within Zabaykalsky Krai Location within Russia
- Coordinates: 52°30′N 116°45′E
- Country: Russia
- Region: Zabaykalsky Krai
- District: Chernyshevsky District
- Time zone: UTC+9:00

Novoilyinsk (Russian: Новоильинск) is a rural locality (a selo) in Chernyshevsky District, Zabaykalsky Krai, Russia. Population: 216 (2021 census); 330 (2010 census); There are 3 streets in this selo.

== Geography ==
This rural locality is located 17 km from Chernyshevsk (the district's administrative centre), 227 km from Chita (capital of Zabaykalsky Krai) and 5,369 km from Moscow. Stary Olov is the nearest rural locality.
