= Urluk =

Urluk Урлук
- Selo
- Location within Zabaykalsky Krai Location within Russia
- Coordinates: 50°02′N 107°53′E
- Country: Russia
- Region: Zabaykalsky Krai
- District: Krasnochikoysky District
- Time zone: UTC+9:00

Urluk (Russian: Урлук) is a rural locality (a selo) in Krasnochikoysky District, Zabaykalsky Krai, Russia. Population: 1,090 (2021 census); 1,417 (2010 census); 1,161 (2002 census); There are 17 streets in this selo.

== Geography ==
This rural locality is located 71 km from Krasny Chikoy (the district's administrative centre), 457 km from Chita (capital of Zabaykalsky Krai) and 5,058 km from Moscow. Goldanovka is the nearest rural locality.
