= Zhindokon =

Zhindokon Жиндокон
- Selo
- Location within Zabaykalsky Krai Location within Russia
- Coordinates: 50°04′N 108°03′E
- Country: Russia
- Region: Zabaykalsky Krai
- District: Krasnochikoysky District
- Time zone: UTC+9:00

Zhindokon (Russian: Жиндокон) is a rural locality (a selo) in Krasnochikoysky District, Zabaykalsky Krai, Russia. Population: 152 (2021 census); 212 (2010 census); 256 (2002 census); There are 2 streets in this selo.

== Geography ==
This rural locality is located 59 km from Krasny Chikoy (the district's administrative centre), 446 km from Chita (capital of Zabaykalsky Krai) and 5,066 km from Moscow. Goldanovka is the nearest rural locality.
