= Domno-Klyuchi =

Domno-Klyuchi Домно-Ключи
- Selo
- Location within Zabaykalsky Krai Location within Russia
- Coordinates: 51°57′N 112°59′E
- Country: Russia
- Region: Zabaykalsky Krai
- District: Chitinsky District
- Time zone: UTC+9:00

Domno-Klyuchi (Russian: Домно-Ключи) is a rural locality (a selo) in Chitinsky District, Zabaykalsky Krai, Russia. Population: 252 (2021 census); 293 (2010 census); There are 4 streets in this selo.

== Geography ==
This rural locality is located 35 km from Chita (the district's administrative centre and capital of Zabaykalsky Krai) and 5,182 km from Moscow. Kolochnoye 2-y is the nearest rural locality.
