= Nadyozhny =

Nadyozhny Надёжный
- Selo
- Location within Zabaykalsky Krai Location within Russia
- Coordinates: 50°01′N 111°49′E
- Country: Russia
- Region: Zabaykalsky Krai
- District: Kyrinsky District
- Time zone: UTC+9:00

Nadyozhny (Russian: Надёжный) is a rural locality (a selo) in Kyrinsky District, Zabaykalsky Krai, Russia. Population: 43 (2021 census); 47 (2010 census); 118 (2002 census); There are 2 streets in this selo.

== Geography ==
This rural locality is located 51 km from Kyra (the district's administrative centre), 253 km from Chita (capital of Zabaykalsky Krai) and 5,339 km from Moscow. Ustye is the nearest rural locality.
