= Khushenga =

Khushenga Хушенга
- Selo
- Location within Zabaykalsky Krai Location within Russia
- Coordinates: 51°26′N 110°55′E
- Country: Russia
- Region: Zabaykalsky Krai
- District: Khiloksky District
- Time zone: UTC+9:00

Khushenga (Russian: Хушенга) is a rural locality (a selo) in Khiloksky District, Zabaykalsky Krai, Russia. Population: 1,519 (2021 census); 1,770 (2010 census); There are 25 streets in this selo.

== Geography ==
This rural locality is located 33 km from Khilok (the district's administrative centre), 191 km from Chita (capital of Zabaykalsky Krai) and 5,104 km from Moscow. Alentuyka is the nearest rural locality.
