= Mangiday =

Mangiday Мангидай
- Selo
- Location within Zabaykalsky Krai Location within Russia
- Coordinates: 52°22′N 118°30′E
- Country: Russia
- Region: Zabaykalsky Krai
- District: Sretensky District
- Time zone: UTC+9:00

Mangiday (Russian: Мангидай) is a rural locality (a selo) in Sretensky District, Zabaykalsky Krai, Russia. Population: 122 (2021 census); 165 (2010 census); 224 (2002 census); There are 2 streets in this selo.

== Geography ==
This rural locality is located 56 km from Sretensk (the district's administrative centre), 342 km from Chita (capital of Zabaykalsky Krai) and 5,504 km from Moscow. Argun is the nearest rural locality.
