= Smolenka, Zabaykalsky Krai =

Smolenka Смоленка
- Selo
- Location within Zabaykalsky Krai Location within Russia
- Coordinates: 52°08′N 113°30′E
- Country: Russia
- Region: Zabaykalsky Krai
- District: Chitinsky District
- Time zone: UTC+9:00

Smolenka (Russian: Смоленка) is a rural locality (a selo) in Chitinsky District, Zabaykalsky Krai, Russia. Population: 10,429 (2021 census); 4,243 (2010 census); There are 132 streets in this selo.

== Geography ==
This rural locality is located 12 km from Chita (the district's administrative centre and capital of Zabaykalsky Krai) and 5,195 km from Moscow. Ugdan is the nearest rural locality.
