= Vasilyevsky Khutor =

Vasilyevsky Khutor Васильевский Хутор
- Selo
- Location within Zabaykalsky Krai Location within Russia
- Coordinates: 50°31′N 117°48′E
- Country: Russia
- Region: Zabaykalsky Krai
- District: Alexandrovo-Zavodsky District
- Time zone: UTC+9:00

Vasilyevsky Khutor (Russian: Васильевский Хутор) is a rural locality (a selo) in Alexandrovo-Zavodsky District, Zabaykalsky Krai, Russia. Population: 199 (2021 census); 256 (2010 census); 369 (2002 census); There are 10 streets in this selo.

== Geography ==
This rural locality is located 45 km from Alexandrovsky Zavod (the district's administrative centre), 348 km from Chita (capital of Zabaykalsky Krai) and 5,698 km from Moscow. Pochekuy is the nearest rural locality.
