= Bogdanovo, Zabaykalsky Krai =

Bogdanovo Богданово
- Selo
- Location within Zabaykalsky Krai Location within Russia
- Coordinates: 51°59′N 117°39′E
- Country: Russia
- Region: Zabaykalsky Krai
- District: Shelopuginsky District
- Time zone: UTC+9:00

Bogdanovo (Russian: Богданово) is a rural locality (a selo) in Shelopuginsky District, Zabaykalsky Krai, Russia. Population: 24 (2021 census); 22 (2010 census); There is 1 street in this selo.

== Geography ==
This rural locality is located 39 km from Shelopugino (the district's administrative centre), 284 km from Chita (capital of Zabaykalsky Krai) and 5,496 km from Moscow. Mironovo is the nearest rural locality.
