= Peshkovo, Zabaykalsky Krai =

Peshkovo Пешково
- Selo
- Location within Zabaykalsky Krai Location within Russia
- Coordinates: 51°49′N 116°26′E
- Country: Russia
- Region: Zabaykalsky Krai
- District: Nerchinsky District
- Time zone: UTC+9:00

Peshkovo (Russian: Пешково) is a rural locality (a selo) in Nerchinsky District, Zabaykalsky Krai, Russia. Population: 452 (2021 census); 476 (2010 census); 506 (2002 census); There are 6 streets in this selo.

== Geography ==
This rural locality is located 19 km from Nerchinsk (the district's administrative centre), 204 km from Chita (capital of Zabaykalsky Krai) and 5,435 km from Moscow. Bishigino is the nearest rural locality.
