= Shiviya, Olovyanninsky District, Zabaykalsky Krai =

Shiviya Шивия
- Selo
- Location within Zabaykalsky Krai Location within Russia
- Coordinates: 51°19′N 116°15′E
- Country: Russia
- Region: Zabaykalsky Krai
- District: Olovyanninsky District
- Time zone: UTC+9:00

Shiviya (Russian: Шивия) is a rural locality (a selo) in Olovyanninsky District, Zabaykalsky Krai, Russia. Population: 48 (2021 census); 57 (2010 census); 113 (2002 census); There are 3 streets in this selo.

== Geography ==
This rural locality is located 64 km from Olovyannaya (the district's administrative centre), 207 km from Chita (capital of Zabaykalsky Krai) and 5,486 km from Moscow. Undino-Poselye is the nearest rural locality.
