= Shirokaya, Nerchinsko-Zavodsky District, Zabaykalsky Krai =

Shirokaya Широкая
- Selo
- Location within Zabaykalsky Krai Location within Russia
- Coordinates: 51°22′N 119°35′E
- Country: Russia
- Region: Zabaykalsky Krai
- District: Nerchinsko-Zavodsky District
- Time zone: UTC+9:00

Shirokaya (Russian: Широкая) is a rural locality (a selo) in Nerchinsko-Zavodsky District, Zabaykalsky Krai, Russia. Population: 416 (2021 census); 415 (2010 census); 450 (2002 census); There are 5 streets in this selo.

== Geography ==
This rural locality is located 6 km from Nerchinsky Zavod (the district's administrative centre), 430 km from Chita (capital of Zabaykalsky Krai) and 5,712 km from Moscow. Nikolskoye is the nearest rural locality.
