= Uronay =

Uronay Уронай
- Selo
- Location within Zabaykalsky Krai Location within Russia
- Coordinates: 51°12′N 114°56′E
- Country: Russia
- Region: Zabaykalsky Krai
- District: Mogoytuysky District
- Time zone: UTC+9:00

Uronay (Russian: Уронай) is a rural locality (a selo) in Mogoytuysky District, Zabaykalsky Krai, Russia. Population: 136 (2021 census); 125 (2010 census); 100 (2002 census); There are 2 streets in this selo.

== Geography ==
This rural locality is located 8 km from Mogoytuy (the district's administrative centre), 136 km from Chita (capital of Zabaykalsky Krai) and 5,409 km from Moscow. Mogoytuy is the nearest rural locality.
