= Kovekta =

Kovekta Ковекта
- Settlement
- Location within Zabaykalsky Krai Location within Russia
- Coordinates: 52°54′N 117°17′E
- Country: Russia
- Region: Zabaykalsky Krai
- District: Chernyshevsky District
- Time zone: UTC+9:00

Kovekta (Russian: Ковекта) is a rural locality (a settlement) in Chernyshevsky District, Zabaykalsky Krai, Russia. Population: 30 (2021 census); 30 (2010 census); There are 2 streets in this settlement.

== Geography ==
This rural locality is located 47 km from Chernyshevsk (the district's administrative centre), 273 km from Chita (capital of Zabaykalsky Krai) and 5,352 km from Moscow. Zhireken is the nearest rural locality.
