= Tsagakshino =

Tsagakshino Цагакшино
- Selo
- Location within Zabaykalsky Krai Location within Russia
- Coordinates: 52°13′N 115°40′E
- Country: Russia
- Region: Zabaykalsky Krai
- District: Tungokochensky District
- Time zone: UTC+9:00

Tsagakshino (Russian: Цагакшино) is a rural locality (a selo) in Tungokochensky District, Zabaykalsky Krai, Russia. Population: 11 (2021 census); 15 (2010 census); 9 (2002 census); There is 1 street in this selo.

== Geography ==
This rural locality is located 61 km from Verkh-Usugli (the district's administrative centre), 150 km from Chita (capital of Zabaykalsky Krai) and 5,331 km from Moscow. Torga is the nearest rural locality.
