= Sukhaytuy =

Sukhaytuy Сухайтуй
- Selo
- Location within Zabaykalsky Krai Location within Russia
- Coordinates: 52°15′N 115°51′E
- Country: Russia
- Region: Zabaykalsky Krai
- District: Tungokochensky District
- Time zone: UTC+9:00

Sukhaytuy (Russian: Сухайтуй) is a rural locality (a selo) in Tungokochensky District, Zabaykalsky Krai, Russia. Population: 21 (2021 census); 37 (2010 census); 61 (2002 census); There is 1 street in this selo.

== Geography ==
This rural locality is located 66 km from Verkh-Usugli (the district's administrative centre), 162 km from Chita (capital of Zabaykalsky Krai) and 5,340 km from Moscow. Butikha is the nearest rural locality.
