= Bulum, Zabaykalsky Krai =

Bulum Булум
- Selo
- Location within Zabaykalsky Krai Location within Russia
- Coordinates: 50°51′N 116°33′E
- Country: Russia
- Region: Zabaykalsky Krai
- District: Olovyanninsky District
- Time zone: UTC+9:00

Bulum (Russian: Булум) is a rural locality (a selo) in Olovyanninsky District, Zabaykalsky Krai, Russia. Population: 320 (2021 census); 466 (2010 census); 714 (2002 census); There are 20 streets in this selo.

== Geography ==
This rural locality is located 69 km from Olovyannaya (the district's administrative centre), 251 km from Chita (capital of Zabaykalsky Krai) and 5,566 km from Moscow. Antiya is the nearest rural locality.
