= Kolochnoye 2-ye =

Kolochnoye 2-ye Колочное 2-е
- Selo
- Location within Zabaykalsky Krai Location within Russia
- Coordinates: 51°58′N 113°08′E
- Country: Russia
- Region: Zabaykalsky Krai
- District: Chitinsky District
- Time zone: UTC+9:00

Kolochnoye 2-ye (Russian: Колочное 2-е) is a rural locality (a selo) in Chitinsky District, Zabaykalsky Krai, Russia. Population: 688 (2021 census); 791 (2010 census); There are 7 streets in this selo.

== Geography ==
This rural locality is located 26 km from Chita (the district's administrative centre and capital of Zabaykalsky Krai) and 5,190 km from Moscow. Kolochnoye 1-ye is the nearest rural locality.
