= Kharauz =

Kharauz Харауз
- Selo
- Location within Zabaykalsky Krai Location within Russia
- Coordinates: 51°14′N 108°28′E
- Country: Russia
- Region: Zabaykalsky Krai
- District: Petrovsk-Zabaykalsky District
- Time zone: UTC+9:00

Kharauz (Russian: Харауз) is a rural locality (a selo) in Petrovsk-Zabaykalsky District, Zabaykalsky Krai, Russia. Population: 713 (2021 census); 883 (2010 census); 973 (2002 census); There are 12 streets in this selo.

== Geography ==
This rural locality is located 26 km from Petrovsk-Zabaykalsky (the district's administrative centre), 361 km from Chita (capital of Zabaykalsky Krai) and 4,957 km from Moscow. Sagan-Nur is the nearest rural locality.
