= Yamkun =

Yamkun Ямкун
- Selo
- Location within Zabaykalsky Krai Location within Russia
- Coordinates: 51°31′N 118°20′E
- Country: Russia
- Region: Zabaykalsky Krai
- District: Gazimuro-Zavodsky District
- Time zone: UTC+9:00

Yamkun (Russian: Ямкун) is a rural locality (a selo) in Gazimuro-Zavodsky District, Zabaykalsky Krai, Russia. Population: 136 (2021 census); 154 (2010 census); There are 6 streets in this selo.
