= Zorgol =

Zorgol Зоргол
- Selo
- Location within Zabaykalsky Krai Location within Russia
- Coordinates: 50°36′N 119°16′E
- Country: Russia
- Region: Zabaykalsky Krai
- District: Priargunsky District
- Time zone: UTC+9:00

Zorgol (Russian: Зоргол) is a rural locality (a selo) in Priargunsky District, Zabaykalsky Krai, Russia. Population: 676 (2021 census); 766 (2010 census); 823 (2002 census); There are 15 streets in this selo.

== Geography ==
This rural locality is located 30 km from Priargunsk (the district's administrative centre), 437 km from Chita (capital of Zabaykalsky Krai) and 5,791 km from Moscow. Vereya is the nearest rural locality.
