= Shaksha, Zabaykalsky Krai =

Shaksha Шакша
- Selo
- Location within Zabaykalsky Krai Location within Russia
- Coordinates: 52°06′N 112°43′E
- Country: Russia
- Region: Zabaykalsky Krai
- District: Chitinsky District
- Time zone: UTC+9:00

Shaksha (Russian: Шакша) is a rural locality (a selo) in Chitinsky District, Zabaykalsky Krai, Russia. Population: 234 (2021 census); 262 (2010 census); There are 5 streets in this selo.

== Geography ==
This rural locality is located 55 km from Chita (the district's administrative centre and capital of Zabaykalsky Krai) and 5,144 km from Moscow. Beklemishevo is the nearest rural locality.
