= Solonechnaya =

Solonechnaya Солонечная
- Selo
- Location within Zabaykalsky Krai Location within Russia
- Coordinates: 51°00′N 119°00′E
- Country: Russia
- Region: Zabaykalsky Krai
- District: Nerchinsko-Zavodsky District
- Time zone: UTC+9:00

Solonechnaya (Russian: Солонечная) is a rural locality (a selo) in Nerchinsko-Zavodsky District, Zabaykalsky Krai, Russia. Population: 39 (2010 census); 62 (2002 census); There is 1 street in this selo.

== Geography ==
This rural locality is located 10 km from Nerchinsky Zavod (the district's administrative centre), 432 km from Chita (capital of Zabaykalsky Krai) and 5,710 km from Moscow. Shirokaya is the nearest rural locality.
