= Kharagun =

Kharagun Харагун
- Selo
- Location within Zabaykalsky Krai Location within Russia
- Coordinates: 51°33′N 111°10′E
- Country: Russia
- Region: Zabaykalsky Krai
- District: Khiloksky District
- Time zone: UTC+9:00

Kharagun (Russian: Харагун) is a rural locality (a selo) in Khiloksky District, Zabaykalsky Krai, Russia. Population: 2,455 (2021 census); 2,800 (2010 census); There are 19 streets in this selo.

== Geography ==
This rural locality is located 54 km from Khilok (the district's administrative centre), 169 km from Chita (capital of Zabaykalsky Krai) and 5,107 km from Moscow. Sarantuy is the nearest rural locality.
