= Domasovo =

Domasovo Домасово
- Selo
- Location within Zabaykalsky Krai Location within Russia
- Coordinates: 51°32′N 119°59′E
- Country: Russia
- Region: Zabaykalsky Krai
- District: Nerchinsko-Zavodsky District
- Time zone: UTC+9:00

Domasovo (Russian: Домасово) is a rural locality (a selo) in Nerchinsko-Zavodsky District, Zabaykalsky Krai, Russia. Population: 144 (2021 census); 161 (2010 census); 183 (2002 census); There are 5 streets in this selo.
