= Aleur =

Aleur Алеур
- Selo
- Location within Zabaykalsky Krai Location within Russia
- Coordinates: 52°05′N 116°46′E
- Country: Russia
- Region: Zabaykalsky Krai
- District: Nerchinsky District
- Time zone: UTC+9:00

Aleur (Russian: Алеур) is a rural locality (a selo) in Nerchinsky District, Zabaykalsky Krai, Russia. Population: 142 (2021 census); 213 (2010 census); There are 3 streets in this selo.
