= Borzhigantay =

Borzhigantay Боржигантай
- Selo
- Location within Zabaykalsky Krai Location within Russia
- Coordinates: 51°00′N 115°00′E
- Country: Russia
- Region: Zabaykalsky Krai
- District: Mogoytuysky District
- Time zone: UTC+9:00

Borzhigantay (Russian: Боржигантай) is a rural locality (a selo) in Mogoytuysky District, Zabaykalsky Krai, Russia. Population: 643 (2021 census); 1,003 (2010 census); 1,166 (2002 census); There are 7 streets in this selo.

== Geography ==
This rural locality is located 65 km from Mogoytuy (the district's administrative centre), 188 km from Chita (capital of Zabaykalsky Krai) and 5,473 km from Moscow. Yedineniye is the nearest rural locality.
