= Perednyaya Byrka =

Perednyaya Byrka Передняя Бырка
- Selo
- Location within Zabaykalsky Krai Location within Russia
- Coordinates: 50°43′N 116°47′E
- Country: Russia
- Region: Zabaykalsky Krai
- District: Borzinsky District
- Time zone: UTC+9:00

Perednyaya Byrka (Russian: Передняя Бырка) is a rural locality (a selo) in Borzinsky District, Zabaykalsky Krai, Russia. Population: 453 (2021 census); 733 (2010 census); 1,000 (2002 census); There are 21 streets in this selo.

== Geography ==
This rural locality is located 42 km from Borzya (the district's administrative centre), 274 km from Chita (capital of Zabaykalsky Krai) and 5,601 km from Moscow. Biliktuy is the nearest rural locality.
