= Ivan-Ozero =

Ivan-Ozero Иван-Озеро
- Selo
- Location within Zabaykalsky Krai Location within Russia
- Coordinates: 52°16′N 113°00′E
- Country: Russia
- Region: Zabaykalsky Krai
- District: Chitinsky District
- Time zone: UTC+9:00

Ivan-Ozero (Russian: Иван-Озеро) is a rural locality (a selo) in Chitinsky District, Zabaykalsky Krai, Russia. Population: 95 (2021 census); 100 (2010 census); There are 13 streets in this selo.

== Geography ==
This rural locality is located 43 km from Chita (the district's administrative centre and capital of Zabaykalsky Krai) and 5,144 km from Moscow. Tasey is the nearest rural locality.
