= Bereya, Zabaykalsky Krai =

Bereya Берея
- Selo
- Location within Zabaykalsky Krai Location within Russia
- Coordinates: 51°37′N 115°18′E
- Country: Russia
- Region: Zabaykalsky Krai
- District: Shilkinsky District
- Time zone: UTC+9:00

Bereya (Russian: Берея) is a rural locality (a selo) in Shilkinsky District, Zabaykalsky Krai, Russia. Population: 121 (2010 census); 154 (2002 census); There is 1 street in this selo.

== Geography ==
This rural locality is located 56 km from Shilka (the district's administrative centre), 133 km from Chita (capital of Zabaykalsky Krai) and 5,384 km from Moscow. Khara-Shibir is the nearest rural locality.
