= Burulyatuy =

Burulyatuy Бурулятуй
- Selo
- Location within Zabaykalsky Krai Location within Russia
- Coordinates: 51°05′N 116°19′E
- Country: Russia
- Region: Zabaykalsky Krai
- District: Olovyanninsky District
- Time zone: UTC+9:00

Burulyatuy (Russian: Бурулятуй) is a rural locality (a selo) in Olovyanninsky District, Zabaykalsky Krai, Russia. Population: 459 (2021 census); 682 (2010 census); 765 (2002 census); There are 10 streets in this selo.

== Geography ==
This rural locality is located 55 km from Olovyannaya (the district's administrative centre), 224 km from Chita (capital of Zabaykalsky Krai) and 5,522 km from Moscow. Dolgokycha is the nearest rural locality.
