= Kandobayevo =

Kandobayevo Кандобаево
- Selo
- Location within Zabaykalsky Krai Location within Russia
- Coordinates: 50°57′N 108°42′E
- Country: Russia
- Region: Zabaykalsky Krai
- District: Petrovsk-Zabaykalsky District
- Time zone: UTC+9:00

Kandobayevo (Russian: Кандобаево) is a rural locality (a selo) in Petrovsk-Zabaykalsky District, Zabaykalsky Krai, Russia. Population: 16 (2021 census); 17 (2010 census); 19 (2002 census); There are 2 streets in this selo.

== Geography ==
This rural locality is located 36 km from Petrovsk-Zabaykalsky (the district's administrative centre), 356 km from Chita (capital of Zabaykalsky Krai) and 5,007 km from Moscow. Katayevo is the nearest rural locality.
