= Novy Durulguy =

Novy Durulguy Новый Дурулгуй
- Selo
- Location within Zabaykalsky Krai Location within Russia
- Coordinates: 50°20′N 114°24′E
- Country: Russia
- Region: Zabaykalsky Krai
- District: Ononsky District
- Time zone: UTC+9:00

Novy Durulguy (Russian: Новый Дурулгуй) is a rural locality (a selo) in Ononsky District, Zabaykalsky Krai, Russia. Population: 688 (2021 census); 828 (2010 census); 1,013 (2002 census); There are 5 streets in this selo.

== Geography ==
This rural locality is located 53 km from Nizhny Tsasuchey (the district's administrative centre), 199 km from Chita (capital of Zabaykalsky Krai) and 5,482 km from Moscow. Ust-Liska is the nearest rural locality.
