= Mukhor-Konduy =

Mukhor-Konduy Мухор-Кондуй
- Selo
- Location within Zabaykalsky Krai Location within Russia
- Coordinates: 52°24′N 113°16′E
- Country: Russia
- Region: Zabaykalsky Krai
- District: Chitinsky District
- Time zone: UTC+9:00

Mukhor-Konduy (Russian: Мухор-Кондуй) is a rural locality (a selo) in Chitinsky District, Zabaykalsky Krai, Russia. Population: 59 (2021 census); 60 (2010 census); There are 3 streets in this selo.

== Geography ==
This rural locality is located 45 km from Chita (the district's administrative centre and capital of Zabaykalsky Krai) and 5,145 km from Moscow. Rucheyki is the nearest rural locality.
