= Bolotovo, Zabaykalsky Krai =

Bolotovo Болотово
- Selo
- Location within Zabaykalsky Krai Location within Russia
- Coordinates: 52°05′N 117°14′E
- Country: Russia
- Region: Zabaykalsky Krai
- District: Sretensky District
- Time zone: UTC+9:00

Bolotovo (Russian: Болотово) is a rural locality (a selo) in Sretensky District, Zabaykalsky Krai, Russia. Population: 175 (2021 census); 210 (2010 census); 265 (2002 census); There are 4 streets in this selo.

== Geography ==
This rural locality is located 37 km from Sretensk (the district's administrative centre), 255 km from Chita (capital of Zabaykalsky Krai) and 5,456 km from Moscow. Bayan is the nearest rural locality.
