= Nekrasovo, Zabaykalsky Krai =

Nekrasovo Некрасово
- Selo
- Location within Zabaykalsky Krai Location within Russia
- Coordinates: 52°01′N 117°38′E
- Country: Russia
- Region: Zabaykalsky Krai
- District: Shelopuginsky District
- Time zone: UTC+9:00

Nekrasovo (Russian: Некрасово) is a rural locality (a selo) in Shelopuginsky District, Zabaykalsky Krai, Russia. Population: 43 (2021 census); 55 (2010 census); There is 1 street in this selo.

== Geography ==
This rural locality is located 42 km from Shelopugino (the district's administrative centre), 283 km from Chita (capital of Zabaykalsky Krai) and 5,490 km from Moscow. Bogdanovo is the nearest rural locality.
