= Krasnaya Imalka =

Selo in Zabaykalsky Krai, Russia

Krasnaya Imalka Красная Ималка
- Selo
- Location within Zabaykalsky Krai Location within Russia
- Coordinates: 50°15′N 115°18′E
- Country: Russia
- Region: Zabaykalsky Krai
- District: Ononsky District
- Time zone: UTC+9:00

Krasnaya Imalka (Russian: Красная Ималка) is a rural locality (a selo) in Ononsky District, Zabaykalsky Krai, Russia. Population: 367 (2021 census); 530 (2010 census); 824 (2002 census); There are 7 streets in this selo.

== Geography ==
This rural locality is located 30 km from Nizhny Tsasuchey (the district's administrative centre), 235 km from Chita (capital of Zabaykalsky Krai) and 5,557 km from Moscow. Narym-Bulak is the nearest rural locality.
