= Turgutuy =

Turgutuy Тургутуй
- Selo
- Location within Zabaykalsky Krai Location within Russia
- Coordinates: 51°50′N 112°38′E
- Country: Russia
- Region: Zabaykalsky Krai
- District: Chitinsky District
- Time zone: UTC+9:00

Turgutuy (Russian: Тургутуй) is a rural locality (a selo) in Chitinsky District, Zabaykalsky Krai, Russia. Population: 15 (2021 census); 22 (2010 census); There are 2 streets in this selo.

== Geography ==
This rural locality is located 62 km from Chita (the district's administrative centre and capital of Zabaykalsky Krai) and 5,173 km from Moscow. Yablonovo is the nearest rural locality.
