= Penkovaya =

Penkovaya Акнада
- Settlement
- Location within Zabaykalsky Krai Location within Russia
- Coordinates: 53°48′N 119°24′E
- Country: Russia
- Region: Zabaykalsky Krai
- District: Mogochinsky District
- Time zone: UTC+9:00

Penkovaya (Russian: Penkovaya) is a rural locality (a settlement) in Mogochinsky District, Zabaykalsky Krai, Russia. Population: 2 (2021 census); 9 (2010 census); 8 (2002 census); There is 1 street in this settlement.

== Geography ==
This rural locality is located 25 km from Mogocha (the district's administrative centre), 435 km from Chita (capital of Zabaykalsky Krai) and 5,374 km from Moscow. Arteushka is the nearest rural locality.
