= Tasey =

Tasey Тасей
- Selo
- Location within Zabaykalsky Krai Location within Russia
- Coordinates: 52°12′N 112°57′E
- Country: Russia
- Region: Zabaykalsky Krai
- District: Chitinsky District
- Time zone: UTC+9:00

Tasey (Russian: Тасей) is a rural locality (a selo) in Chitinsky District, Zabaykalsky Krai, Russia. Population: 81 (2021 census); 107 (2010 census); There are 5 streets in this selo.

== Geography ==
This rural locality is located 42 km from Chita (the district's administrative centre and capital of Zabaykalsky Krai) and 5,148 km from Moscow. Ivan-Ozero is the nearest rural locality.
