= Mironovo, Zabaykalsky Krai =

Mironovo Мироново
- Selo
- Location within Zabaykalsky Krai Location within Russia
- Coordinates: 51°58′N 117°39′E
- Country: Russia
- Region: Zabaykalsky Krai
- District: Shelopuginsky District
- Time zone: UTC+9:00

Mironovo (Russian: Мироново) is a rural locality (a selo) in Shelopuginsky District, Zabaykalsky Krai, Russia. Population: 183 (2021 census); 273 (2010 census); There are 3 streets in this selo.

== Geography ==
This rural locality is located 36 km from Shelopugino (the district's administrative centre), 284 km from Chita (capital of Zabaykalsky Krai) and 5,499 km from Moscow. Bogdanovo is the nearest rural locality.
