= Milgidun =

Milgidun Мильгидун
- Selo
- Location within Zabaykalsky Krai Location within Russia
- Coordinates: 52°39′N 116°55′E
- Country: Russia
- Region: Zabaykalsky Krai
- District: Chernyshevsky District
- Time zone: UTC+9:00

Milgidun (Russian: Мильгидун) is a rural locality (a selo) in Chernyshevsky District, Zabaykalsky Krai, Russia. Population: 679 (2021 census); 717 (2010 census); There are 8 streets in this selo.

== Geography ==
This rural locality is located 16 km from Chernyshevsk (the district's administrative centre), 241 km from Chita (capital of Zabaykalsky Krai) and 5,360 km from Moscow. Kumakanda is the nearest rural locality.
