= Verkhny Telenguy =

Verkhny Telenguy Верхний Теленгуй
- Selo
- Location within Zabaykalsky Krai Location within Russia
- Coordinates: 51°38′N 116°03′E
- Country: Russia
- Region: Zabaykalsky Krai
- District: Shilkinsky District
- Time zone: UTC+9:00

Verkhny Telenguy (Russian: Верхний Теленгуй) is a rural locality (a selo) in Shilkinsky District, Zabaykalsky Krai, Russia. Population: 106 (2010 census); 118 (2002 census); There is 1 street in this selo.

== Geography ==
This rural locality is located 24 km from Shilka (the district's administrative centre), 182 km from Chita (capital of Zabaykalsky Krai) and 5,432 km from Moscow. Ust-Telenguy is the nearest rural locality.
