= Kumakhta =

Kumakhta Кумахта
- Selo
- Location within Zabaykalsky Krai Location within Russia
- Coordinates: 51°21′N 113°44′E
- Country: Russia
- Region: Zabaykalsky Krai
- District: Karymsky District
- Time zone: UTC+9:00

Kumakhta (Russian: Кумахта) is a rural locality (a selo) in Karymsky District, Zabaykalsky Krai, Russia. Population: 95 (2021 census); 106 (2010 census); 116 (2002 census); There is 1 street in this selo.

== Geography ==
This rural locality is located 51 km from Karymskoye (the district's administrative centre), 77 km from Chita (capital of Zabaykalsky Krai) and 5,308 km from Moscow. Tyrgetuy is the nearest rural locality.
