= Cheremkhovo (inhabited locality) =

Cheremkhovo (Russian: Черемхово) is the name of several inhabited localities in Russia.

== Modern localities ==
=== Urban localities ===
- Cheremkhovo, a town in Irkutsk Oblast; 53°09′N 103°04′E

=== Rural localities ===
- Cheremkhovo, Amur Oblast, a selo in Cheremkhovsky Rural Settlement of Ivanovsky District in Amur Oblast; 50°25′N 27°47′E
- Cheremkhovo, Kaliningrad Oblast, a settlement in Nizovsky Rural Okrug of Guryevsky District in Kaliningrad Oblast
- Cheremkhovo, Sverdlovsk Oblast, a selo in Cheremkhovsky Selsoviet of Kamensky District in Sverdlovsk Oblast
- Cheremkhovo, Tomsk Oblast, a village in Chainsky District of Tomsk Oblast
- Cheremkhovo, Krasnochikoysky District, Zabaykalsky Krai, a selo in Krasnochikoysky District of Zabaykalsky Krai
- Cheremkhovo, Ulyotovsky District, Zabaykalsky Krai, a selo in Ulyotovsky District of Zabaykalsky Krai

== Alternative names ==
- Cheremkhovo, alternative name of Cheremushka, a settlement in Gremyachinsky Selsoviet of Pribaykalsky District in the Republic of Buryatia; 52°45′N 08°06′E
