= Yadrikhino =

Yadrikhino Ядрихино
- Selo
- Location within Zabaykalsky Krai Location within Russia
- Coordinates: 50°36′N 110°20′E
- Country: Russia
- Region: Zabaykalsky Krai
- District: Krasnochikoysky District
- Time zone: UTC+9:00

Yadrikhino (Russian: Ядрихино) is a rural locality (a selo) in Krasnochikoysky District, Zabaykalsky Krai, Russia. Population: 114 (2021 census); 141 (2010 census); 201 (2002 census); There are 4 streets in this selo.

== Geography ==
This rural locality is located 115 km from Krasny Chikoy (the district's administrative centre), 274 km from Chita (capital of Zabaykalsky Krai) and 5,164 km from Moscow. Ust-Yamarovka is the nearest rural locality.
