= Fomichyovo =

Fomichyovo Фомичёво
- Selo
- Location within Zabaykalsky Krai Location within Russia
- Coordinates: 50°00′N 108°00′E
- Country: Russia
- Region: Zabaykalsky Krai
- District: Krasnochikoysky District
- Time zone: UTC+9:00

Fomichyovo (Russian: Фомичёво) is a rural locality (a selo) in Krasnochikoysky District, Zabaykalsky Krai, Russia. Population: 294 (2021 census); 337 (2010 census); 411 (2002 census); There are 5 streets in this selo.

== Geography ==
This rural locality is located 40 km from Krasny Chikoy (the district's administrative centre), 344 km from Chita (capital of Zabaykalsky Krai) and 5,100 km from Moscow. Zakharovo is the nearest rural locality.
