= Koty, Zabaykalsky Krai =

Koty Котый
- Selo
- Location within Zabaykalsky Krai Location within Russia
- Coordinates: 50°07′N 108°22′E
- Country: Russia
- Region: Zabaykalsky Krai
- District: Krasnochikoysky District
- Time zone: UTC+9:00

Koty (Russian: Котый) is a rural locality (a selo) in Krasnochikoysky District, Zabaykalsky Krai, Russia. Population: 48 (2021 census); 77 (2010 census); 88 (2002 census); There is 1 street in this selo.

== Geography ==
This rural locality is located 38 km from Krasny Chikoy (the district's administrative centre), 423 km from Chita (capital of Zabaykalsky Krai) and 5,083 km from Moscow. Bolshaya Rechka is the nearest rural locality.
