= Korotkovo, Zabaykalsky Krai =

Korotkovo Коротково
- Selo
- Location within Zabaykalsky Krai Location within Russia
- Coordinates: 50°26′N 108°58′E
- Country: Russia
- Region: Zabaykalsky Krai
- District: Krasnochikoysky District
- Time zone: UTC+9:00

Korotkovo (Russian: Коротково) is a rural locality (a selo) in Krasnochikoysky District, Zabaykalsky Krai, Russia. Population: 484 (2021 census); 515 (2010 census); 573 (2002 census); There are 3 streets in this selo.

== Geography ==
This rural locality is located 18 km from Krasny Chikoy (the district's administrative centre), 366 km from Chita (capital of Zabaykalsky Krai) and 5,087 km from Moscow. Bykovo is the nearest rural locality.
