= Yamarovka =

Yamarovka Ямаровка
- Selo
- Location within Zabaykalsky Krai Location within Russia
- Coordinates: 50°36′N 110°14′E
- Country: Russia
- Region: Zabaykalsky Krai
- District: Krasnochikoysky District
- Time zone: UTC+9:00

Yamarovka (Russian: Ямаровка) is a rural locality (a selo) in Krasnochikoysky District, Zabaykalsky Krai, Russia. Population: 79 (2021 census); 98 (2010 census); 136 (2002 census); There are 2 streets in this selo.

== Geography ==
This rural locality is located 109 km from Krasny Chikoy (the district's administrative centre), 278 km from Chita (capital of Zabaykalsky Krai) and 5,156 km from Moscow. Steklozavod is the nearest rural locality.
