= Nizhny Narym =

Nizhny Narym Нижний Нарым
- Selo
- Location within Zabaykalsky Krai Location within Russia
- Coordinates: 50°05′N 108°14′E
- Country: Russia
- Region: Zabaykalsky Krai
- District: Krasnochikoysky District
- Time zone: UTC+9:00

Nizhny Narym (Russian: Нижний Нарым) is a rural locality (a selo) in Krasnochikoysky District, Zabaykalsky Krai, Russia. Population: 93 (2021 census); 137 (2010 census); 198 (2002 census); There is 1 street in this selo.

== Geography ==
This rural locality is located 48 km from Krasny Chikoy (the district's administrative centre), 433 km from Chita (capital of Zabaykalsky Krai) and 5,078 km from Moscow. Albituy is the nearest rural locality.
