= Gremyacha =

Gremyacha Гремяча
- Selo
- Location within Zabaykalsky Krai Location within Russia
- Coordinates: 50°00′N 108°00′E
- Country: Russia
- Region: Zabaykalsky Krai
- District: Krasnochikoysky District
- Time zone: UTC+9:00

Gremyacha (Russian: Гремяча) is a rural locality (a selo) in Krasnochikoysky District, Zabaykalsky Krai, Russia. Population: 10 (2021 census); 25 (2010 census); 37 (2002 census); There is 1 street in this selo.

== Geography ==
This rural locality is located 9 km from Krasny Chikoy (the district's administrative centre), 394 km from Chita (capital of Zabaykalsky Krai) and 5,077 km from Moscow. Baykhor is the nearest rural locality.
