= Mostovka, Zabaykalsky Krai =

Mostovka Мостовка
- Selo
- Location within Zabaykalsky Krai Location within Russia
- Coordinates: 50°18′N 108°33′E
- Country: Russia
- Region: Zabaykalsky Krai
- District: Krasnochikoysky District
- Time zone: UTC+9:00

Mostovka (Russian: Мостовка) is a rural locality (a selo) in Krasnochikoysky District, Zabaykalsky Krai, Russia. Population: 87 (2021 census); 83 (2010 census); 100 (2002 census); There are 2 streets in this selo.

== Geography ==
This rural locality is located 15 km from Krasny Chikoy (the district's administrative centre), 400 km from Chita (capital of Zabaykalsky Krai) and 5,073 km from Moscow. Baykhor is the nearest rural locality.
