= Krasnye Rechki =

Krasnye Rechki Красные Речки
- Selo
- Location within Zabaykalsky Krai Location within Russia
- Coordinates: 50°27′N 109°06′E
- Country: Russia
- Region: Zabaykalsky Krai
- District: Krasnochikoysky District
- Time zone: UTC+9:00

Krasnye Rechki (Russian: Красные Речки) is a rural locality (a selo) in Krasnochikoysky District, Zabaykalsky Krai, Russia. Population: 81 (2021 census); 120 (2002 census); There are 2 streets in this selo.

== Geography ==
This rural locality is located 27 km from Krasny Chikoy (the district's administrative centre), 357 km from Chita (capital of Zabaykalsky Krai) and 5,094 km from Moscow. Bolshakovo is the nearest rural locality.
