= Shimbilik =

Shimbilik Шимбилик
- Selo
- Location within Zabaykalsky Krai Location within Russia
- Coordinates: 50°33′N 109°34′E
- Country: Russia
- Region: Zabaykalsky Krai
- District: Krasnochikoysky District
- Time zone: UTC+9:00

Shimbilik (Russian: Шимбилик) is a rural locality (a selo) in Krasnochikoysky District, Zabaykalsky Krai, Russia. Population: 465 (2021 census); 601 (2010 census); 727 (2002 census); There are 7 streets in this selo.

== Geography ==
This rural locality is located 62 km from Krasny Chikoy (the district's administrative centre), 322 km from Chita (capital of Zabaykalsky Krai) and 5,115 km from Moscow. Osinovka is the nearest rural locality.
