= Margintuy =

Margintuy Маргинтуй
- Selo
- Location within Zabaykalsky Krai Location within Russia
- Coordinates: 50°08′N 108°27′E
- Country: Russia
- Region: Zabaykalsky Krai
- District: Krasnochikoysky District
- Time zone: UTC+9:00

Margintuy (Russian: Маргинтуй) is a rural locality (a selo) in Krasnochikoysky District, Zabaykalsky Krai, Russia. Population: 3 (2010 census); 6 (2002 census); There is 1 street in this selo.

== Geography ==
This rural locality is located 32 km from Krasny Chikoy (the district's administrative centre), 416 km from Chita (capital of Zabaykalsky Krai) and 5,087 km from Moscow. Bolshaya Rechka is the nearest rural locality.
