= Shonuy =

Shonuy Шонуй
- Selo
- Location within Zabaykalsky Krai Location within Russia
- Coordinates: 49°38′N 108°58′E
- Country: Russia
- Region: Zabaykalsky Krai
- District: Krasnochikoysky District
- Time zone: UTC+9:00

Shonuy (Russian: Шонуй) is a rural locality (a selo) in Krasnochikoysky District, Zabaykalsky Krai, Russia. Population: 76 (2021 census); 98 (2010 census); 106 (2002 census); There are 3 streets in this selo.

== Geography ==
This rural locality is located 82 km from Krasny Chikoy (the district's administrative centre), 420 km from Chita (capital of Zabaykalsky Krai) and 5,183 km from Moscow. Ukyr is the nearest rural locality.
