= Golubichnaya =

Golubichnaya Голубичная
- Settlement
- Location within Zabaykalsky Krai Location within Russia
- Coordinates: 51°37′N 113°02′E
- Country: Russia
- Region: Zabaykalsky Krai
- District: Ulyotovsky District
- Time zone: UTC+9:00

Golubichnaya (Russian: Голубичная) is a rural locality (a settlement) in Ulyotovsky District, Zabaykalsky Krai, Russia. Population: 318 (2010 census); 381 (2002 census); There are 7 streets in this settlement.

== Geography ==
This rural locality is located 49 km from Ulyoty (the district's administrative centre), 55 km from Chita (capital of Zabaykalsky Krai) and 5,227 km from Moscow. Krasnaya Rechka is the nearest rural locality.
