= Tataurovo, Zabaykalsky Krai =

Tataurovo Татаурово
- Selo
- Location within Zabaykalsky Krai Location within Russia
- Coordinates: 51°36′N 112°56′E
- Country: Russia
- Region: Zabaykalsky Krai
- District: Ulyotovsky District
- Time zone: UTC+9:00

Tataurovo (Russian: Татаурово) is a rural locality (a selo) in Ulyotovsky District, Zabaykalsky Krai, Russia. Population: 663 (2010 census); 767 (2002 census); There are 8 streets in this selo.

== Geography ==
This rural locality is located 41 km from Ulyoty (the district's administrative centre), 62 km from Chita (capital of Zabaykalsky Krai) and 5,222 km from Moscow. Drovyanaya is the nearest rural locality.
