= Cheremkhovo, Krasnochikoysky District, Zabaykalsky Krai =

Cheremkhovo Черемхово
- Selo
- Location within Zabaykalsky Krai Location within Russia
- Coordinates: 50°34′N 110°09′E
- Country: Russia
- Region: Zabaykalsky Krai
- District: Krasnochikoysky District
- Time zone: UTC+9:00

Cheremkhovo (Russian: Черемхово) is a rural locality (a selo) in Krasnochikoysky District, Zabaykalsky Krai, Russia. Population: 580 (2021 census); 686 (2010 census); 712 (2002 census); There are 7 streets in this selo.

== Geography ==
This rural locality is located 102 km from Krasny Chikoy (the district's administrative centre), 286 km from Chita (capital of Zabaykalsky Krai) and 5,154 km from Moscow. Afonkino is the nearest rural locality.
