= Novye Klyuchi =

Novye Klyuchi Новые Ключи
- Selo
- Location within Zabaykalsky Krai Location within Russia
- Coordinates: 50°59′N 111°47′E
- Country: Russia
- Region: Zabaykalsky Krai
- District: Ulyotovsky District
- Time zone: UTC+9:00

Novye Klyuchi (Russian: Новые Ключи) is a rural locality (a selo) in Ulyotovsky District, Zabaykalsky Krai, Russia. Population: 114 (2010 census); 145 (2002 census); There are 2 streets in this selo.

== Geography ==
This rural locality is located 63 km from Ulyoty (the district's administrative centre), 166 km from Chita (capital of Zabaykalsky Krai) and 5,219 km from Moscow. Starye Klyuchi is the nearest rural locality.
