= Khilkotoy =

Khilkotoy Хилкотой
- Selo
- Location within Zabaykalsky Krai Location within Russia
- Coordinates: 50°00′N 108°00′E
- Country: Russia
- Region: Zabaykalsky Krai
- District: Krasnochikoysky District
- Time zone: UTC+9:00

Khilkotoy (Russian: Хилкотой) is a rural locality (a selo) in Krasnochikoysky District, Zabaykalsky Krai, Russia. Population: 54 (2021 census); 81 (2010 census); 120 (2002 census); There is 1 street in this selo.

== Geography ==
This rural locality is located 69 km from Krasny Chikoy (the district's administrative centre), 454 km from Chita (capital of Zabaykalsky Krai) and 5,086 km from Moscow. Zhindo is the nearest rural locality.
