= Osinovka, Zabaykalsky Krai =

Osinovka Осиновка
- Selo
- Location within Zabaykalsky Krai Location within Russia
- Coordinates: 50°33′N 109°27′E
- Country: Russia
- Region: Zabaykalsky Krai
- District: Krasnochikoysky District
- Time zone: UTC+9:00

Osinovka (Russian: Осиновка) is a rural locality (a selo) in Krasnochikoysky District, Zabaykalsky Krai, Russia. Population: 131 (2021 census); 169 (2010 census); 220 (2002 census); There are 2 streets in this selo.

== Geography ==
This rural locality is located 54 km from Krasny Chikoy (the district's administrative centre), 329 km from Chita (capital of Zabaykalsky Krai) and 5,108 km from Moscow. Zakharovo is the nearest rural locality.
