= Khentei =

Khentei may refer to:

- Khentii Mountains
- Khentei Range
- Khentei-Daur Highlands
