= Konkino =

Konkino Конкино
- Selo
- Location within Zabaykalsky Krai Location within Russia
- Coordinates: 50°00′N 108°00′E
- Country: Russia
- Region: Zabaykalsky Krai
- District: Krasnochikoysky District
- Time zone: UTC+9:00

Konkino (Russian: Конкино) is a rural locality (a selo) in Krasnochikoysky District, Zabaykalsky Krai, Russia. Population: 225 (2021 census); 260 (2010 census); 357 (2002 census); There are 5 streets in this selo.

== Geography ==
This rural locality is located 79 km from Krasny Chikoy (the district's administrative centre), 462 km from Chita (capital of Zabaykalsky Krai) and 5,099 km from Moscow. Khilkotoy is the nearest rural locality.
