= Stanovik Range =

Mountain range in Russia

- Становик
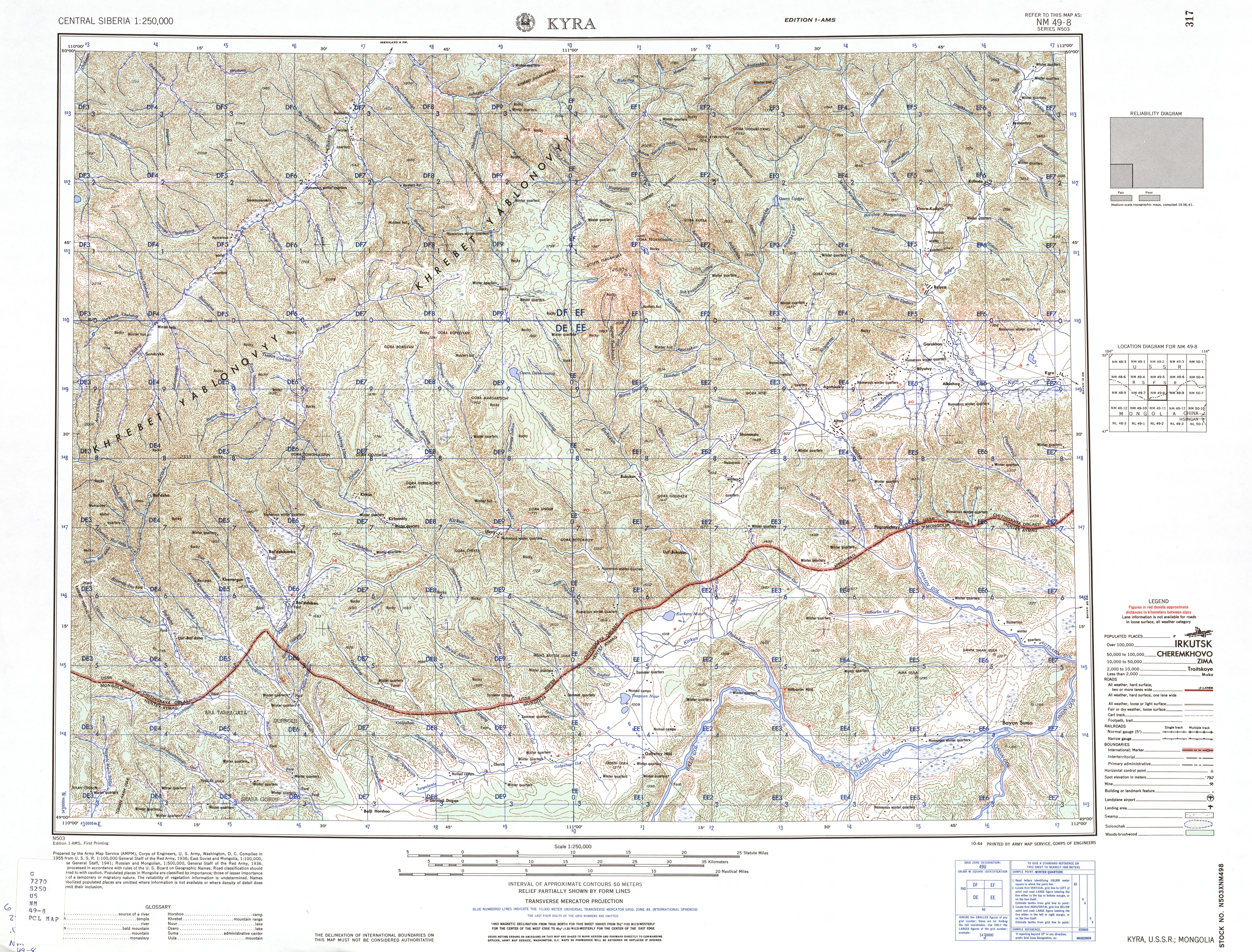
- Map of the area with part of the Stanovik in the right.

Highest point
- Peak: Unnamed
- Elevation: 1,916 m (6,286 ft)

Dimensions
- Length: 110 km (68 mi) NE/SW
- Width: 40–70 km (25–43 mi) SE/NW

Geography
- Location within Zabaykalsky Krai
- Country: Russia
- Krai: Zabaykalsky Krai
- Range coordinates: 50°0′N 112°12′E
- Parent range: Khentei-Daur Highlands

Geology
- Orogeny: Alpine orogeny
- Rock age: Jurassic
- Rock type(s): Volcanic rock and granodiorite

Climbing
- Easiest route: From Mordoy or Kyra

The Stanovik (Russian: Становик) is a mountain range in the Transbaikal Region (Zabaykalsky Krai) of Siberia, Russia. The southern end of the range is very close to the border with Mongolia. The nearest village is Mordoy (Мордой), Kyrinsky District.

The range is part of the Trans-Baikal conifer forests ecoregion.

== Geography ==
The Stanovik Range is part of the Khentei-Daur Highlands, South Siberian System. It rises on the left bank of the upper course of the Onon River and stretches roughly northeastwards for over 110 kilometers (68 mi) between two of its left tributaries, the Kyra and the Aksha. It is bound by the Bylir River valley to the west and near its source it connects with the Khentei Range. The width of the Stanovik ranges between a maximum of 70 kilometers (43 mi) and a minimum of 40 kilometers (25 mi).

The average summits of the Stanovik reach between 1,200 meters (3,900 ft) and 1,600 meters (5,200 ft). The highest point is a 1,916 meters (6,286 ft) high unnamed peak. Much like in neighboring ranges, the relief is dominated by moderate height mountains with an abundance of steep-slopes and faults. The summits display fragments of the original alignment surface. The range rises in an area prone to earthquakes.

== Flora ==
The slopes of the range are covered with mountain taiga and pre-Alpine forest. The higher elevations have dwarf cedar shrub and are often crowned by golets type bare summits.

== See also ==
- List of mountains and hills of Russia
- Sokhondo Nature Reserve
