= Deshulan =

Deshulan Дешулан
- Selo
- Location within Zabaykalsky Krai Location within Russia
- Coordinates: 51°00′N 112°00′E
- Country: Russia
- Region: Zabaykalsky Krai
- District: Ulyotovsky District
- Time zone: UTC+9:00

Deshulan (Russian: Дешулан) is a rural locality (a selo) in Ulyotovsky District, Zabaykalsky Krai, Russia. Population: 249 (2010 census); 323 (2002 census); There are 3 streets in this selo.

== Geography ==
This rural locality is located 66 km from Ulyoty (the district's administrative centre), 169 km from Chita (capital of Zabaykalsky Krai) and 5,219 km from Moscow. Novye Klyuchi is the nearest rural locality.
