= Ukyr, Zabaykalsky Krai =

Ukyr Укыр
- Selo
- Location within Zabaykalsky Krai Location within Russia
- Coordinates: 49°27′N 108°52′E
- Country: Russia
- Region: Zabaykalsky Krai
- District: Krasnochikoysky District
- Time zone: UTC+9:00

Ukyr (Russian: Укыр) is a rural locality (a selo) in Krasnochikoysky District, Zabaykalsky Krai, Russia. Population: 249 (2021 census); 289 (2010 census); 324 (2002 census); There are 5 streets in this selo.

== Geography ==
This rural locality is located 101 km from Krasny Chikoy (the district's administrative centre), 440 km from Chita (capital of Zabaykalsky Krai) and 5,197 km from Moscow. Menza is the nearest rural locality.
