= Ust-Yamarovka =

Ust-Yamarovka Усть-Ямаровка
- Selo
- Location within Zabaykalsky Krai Location within Russia
- Coordinates: 50°35′N 110°16′E
- Country: Russia
- Region: Zabaykalsky Krai
- District: Krasnochikoysky District
- Time zone: UTC+9:00

Ust-Yamarovka (Russian: Усть-Ямаровка) is a rural locality (a selo) in Krasnochikoysky District, Zabaykalsky Krai, Russia. Population: 49 (2021 census); 72 (2010 census); 76 (2002 census); There is 1 street in this selo.

== Geography ==
This rural locality is located 110 km from Krasny Chikoy (the district's administrative centre), 279 km from Chita (capital of Zabaykalsky Krai) and 5,161 km from Moscow. Steklozavod is the nearest rural locality.
