= Ust-Urluk =

Ust-Urluk Усть-Урлук
- Selo
- Location within Zabaykalsky Krai Location within Russia
- Coordinates: 49°56′N 107°48′E
- Country: Russia
- Region: Zabaykalsky Krai
- District: Krasnochikoysky District
- Time zone: UTC+9:00

Ust-Urluk (Russian: Усть-Урлук) is a rural locality (a selo) in Krasnochikoysky District, Zabaykalsky Krai, Russia. Population: 126 (2021 census); 140 (2010 census); 206 (2002 census); There are 4 streets in this selo.

== Geography ==
This rural locality is located 82 km from Krasny Chikoy (the district's administrative centre), 469 km from Chita (capital of Zabaykalsky Krai) and 5,064 km from Moscow. Zhindo is the nearest rural locality.
