= Atsa, Zabaykalsky Krai =

Atsa Аца
- Selo
- Location within Zabaykalsky Krai Location within Russia
- Coordinates: 50°29′N 109°33′E
- Country: Russia
- Region: Zabaykalsky Krai
- District: Krasnochikoysky District
- Time zone: UTC+9:00

Atsa (Russian: Аца) is a rural locality (a selo) in Krasnochikoysky District, Zabaykalsky Krai, Russia. Population: 140 (2021 census); 175 (2010 census); 210 (2002 census); There are 5 streets in this selo.

== Geography ==
This rural locality is located 58 km from Krasny Chikoy (the district's administrative centre), 328 km from Chita (capital of Zabaykalsky Krai) and 5,123 km from Moscow. Shimbilik is the nearest rural locality.
