= Leninsky, Ulyotovsky District, Zabaykalsky Krai =

Leninsky Ленинский
- Selo
- Location within Zabaykalsky Krai Location within Russia
- Coordinates: 50°50′N 111°30′E
- Country: Russia
- Region: Zabaykalsky Krai
- District: Ulyotovsky District
- Time zone: UTC+9:00

Leninsky (Russian: Ленинский) is a rural locality (a selo) in Ulyotovsky District, Zabaykalsky Krai, Russia. Population: 538 (2021 census); 658 (2010 census); There are 20 streets in this selo.

== Geography ==
This rural locality is located 89 km from Ulyoty (the district's administrative centre), 192 km from Chita (capital of Zabaykalsky Krai) and 5,217 km from Moscow. Novosaliya is the nearest rural locality.
