= Chikokon Range =

Mountain range in Siberia, Russia

- Чикоконский хребет
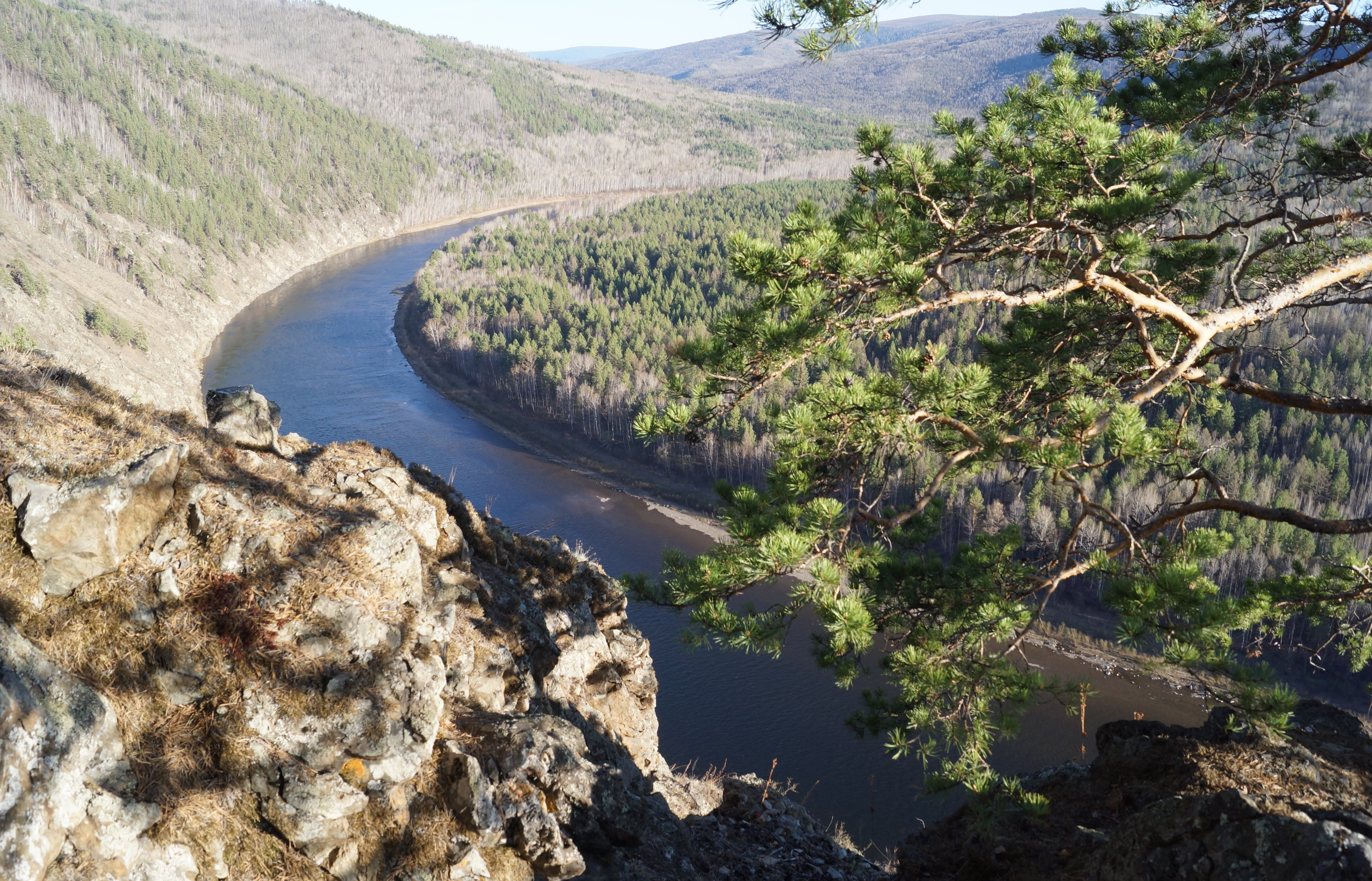
- Upper course of the Chikoy River

Highest point
- Peak: Bystrinsky Golets
- Elevation: 2,519 m (8,264 ft)

Dimensions
- Length: 130 km (81 mi) NE/SW
- Width: 40 km (25 mi) SE/NW

Geography
- Location within Zabaykalsky Krai
- Country: Russia
- Krai: Zabaykalsky Krai
- Range coordinates: 49°36′N 110°0′E
- Parent range: Khentei-Daur Highlands
- Borders on: Mongolia

Geology
- Rock ages: Late Paleozoic (NE) and Jurassic (SW)

The Chikokon Range (Russian: Чикоконский хребет) is a mountain range in the Transbaikal Region (Zabaykalsky Krai) of Siberia, Russia. The range is named after the Chikokon River, a small left tributary of the Chikoy River.

The Chikokon Range is within the limits of the Trans-Baikal conifer forests ecoregion. The Chikoy National Park is located in the area of the range.

== Geography ==
The Chikokon Range is part of the Khentei-Daur Highlands, South Siberian System. It rises in the interfluve of the Chikoy River, a right tributary of the Selenga, and some tributaries of the Onon River. The southern part of the ridge acts as watershed between the Arctic and Pacific oceans. The relief is characterized by steep slopes. Traces of Pleistocene glaciation in the form of sediments are present in certain places of the range.

The mountain chain stretches roughly northeastwards for over 130 kilometers (81 mi) from Mongolia until the confluence of the Chikoy and Chikokon rivers. The maximum width of the range is 40 kilometers (25 mi). The main summits of the Chikokon Range reach heights between 2,000 meters (6,600 ft) and 2,200 meters (7,200 ft). The highest point is 2,519 meters (8,264 ft) high Bystrinsky Golets, a "golets" type summit which is also the highest point of the Khentei-Daur Highlands. Spurs extending from the Chikokon Range connect with the Pereval and Burkal ranges.

== Flora ==
The slopes of the range are mainly covered with mountain taiga and pre-Alpine forest. The higher parts are topped by "golets" type bare summits.

== See also ==
- Chikoy National Park
