= Bykovo, Zabaykalsky Krai =

Bykovo Быково
- Selo
- Location within Zabaykalsky Krai Location within Russia
- Coordinates: 50°25′N 109°00′E
- Country: Russia
- Region: Zabaykalsky Krai
- District: Krasnochikoysky District
- Time zone: UTC+9:00

Bykovo (Russian: Быково) is a rural locality (a selo) in Krasnochikoysky District, Zabaykalsky Krai, Russia. Population: 91 (2021 census); 129 (2010 census); 143 (2002 census); There are 4 streets in this selo.

== Geography ==
This rural locality is located 20 km from Krasny Chikoy (the district's administrative centre), 365 km from Chita (capital of Zabaykalsky Krai) and 5,093 km from Moscow. Bolshakovo is the nearest rural locality.
