= Ablatuysky Bor =

Ablatuysky Bor Аблатуйский Бор
- Selo
- Location within Zabaykalsky Krai Location within Russia
- Coordinates: 51°11′N 112°13′E
- Country: Russia
- Region: Zabaykalsky Krai
- District: Ulyotovsky District
- Time zone: UTC+9:00

Ablatuysky Bor (Russian: Аблатуйский Бор) is a rural locality (a selo) in Ulyotovsky District, Zabaykalsky Krai, Russia. Population: 514 (2021 census); 547 (2010 census); 672 (2002 census); There are 15 streets in this selo.

== Geography ==
This rural locality is located 26 km from Ulyoty (the district's administrative centre), 129 km from Chita (capital of Zabaykalsky Krai) and 5,224 km from Moscow. Doroninskoye is the nearest rural locality.
