= Tanga, Zabaykalsky Krai =

Tanga Танга
- Selo
- Location within Zabaykalsky Krai Location within Russia
- Coordinates: 50°59′N 111°33′E
- Country: Russia
- Region: Zabaykalsky Krai
- District: Ulyotovsky District
- Time zone: UTC+9:00

Tanga (Russian: Танга) is a rural locality (a selo) in Ulyotovsky District, Zabaykalsky Krai, Russia. Population: 662 (2010 census); 767 (2002 census); There are 11 streets in this selo.

== Geography ==
This rural locality is located 77 km from Ulyoty (the district's administrative centre), 179 km from Chita (capital of Zabaykalsky Krai) and 5,202 km from Moscow. Novosaliya is the nearest rural locality.
