= Doroninskoye =

Doroninskoye Доронинское
- Selo
- Location within Zabaykalsky Krai Location within Russia
- Coordinates: 51°07′N 112°08′E
- Country: Russia
- Region: Zabaykalsky Krai
- District: Ulyotovsky District
- Time zone: UTC+9:00

Doroninskoye (Russian: Доронинское) is a rural locality (a selo) in Ulyotovsky District, Zabaykalsky Krai, Russia. Population: 663 (2021 census); 796 (2010 census); There are 7 streets in this selo.

== Geography ==
This rural locality is located 35 km from Ulyoty (the district's administrative centre), 138 km from Chita (capital of Zabaykalsky Krai) and 5,226 km from Moscow. Ablatuysky Bor is the nearest rural locality.
