= Albituy =

Albituy Альбитуй
- Selo
- Location within Zabaykalsky Krai Location within Russia
- Coordinates: 50°08′N 108°13′E
- Country: Russia
- Region: Zabaykalsky Krai
- District: Krasnochikoysky District
- Time zone: UTC+9:00

Albituy (Russian: Альбитуй) is a rural locality (a selo) in Krasnochikoysky District, Zabaykalsky Krai, Russia. Population: 279 (2021 census); 350 (2010 census); 386 (2002 census); There are 6 streets in this selo.

== Geography ==
This rural locality is located 45 km from Krasny Chikoy (the district's administrative centre), 431 km from Chita (capital of Zabaykalsky Krai) and 5,071 km from Moscow. Sredny Shergldzhin is the nearest rural locality.
