= Delüün Boldog =

Purported birthplace of Genghis Khan in Mongolia

Coordinates: 49°01′18″N 111°37′29″E

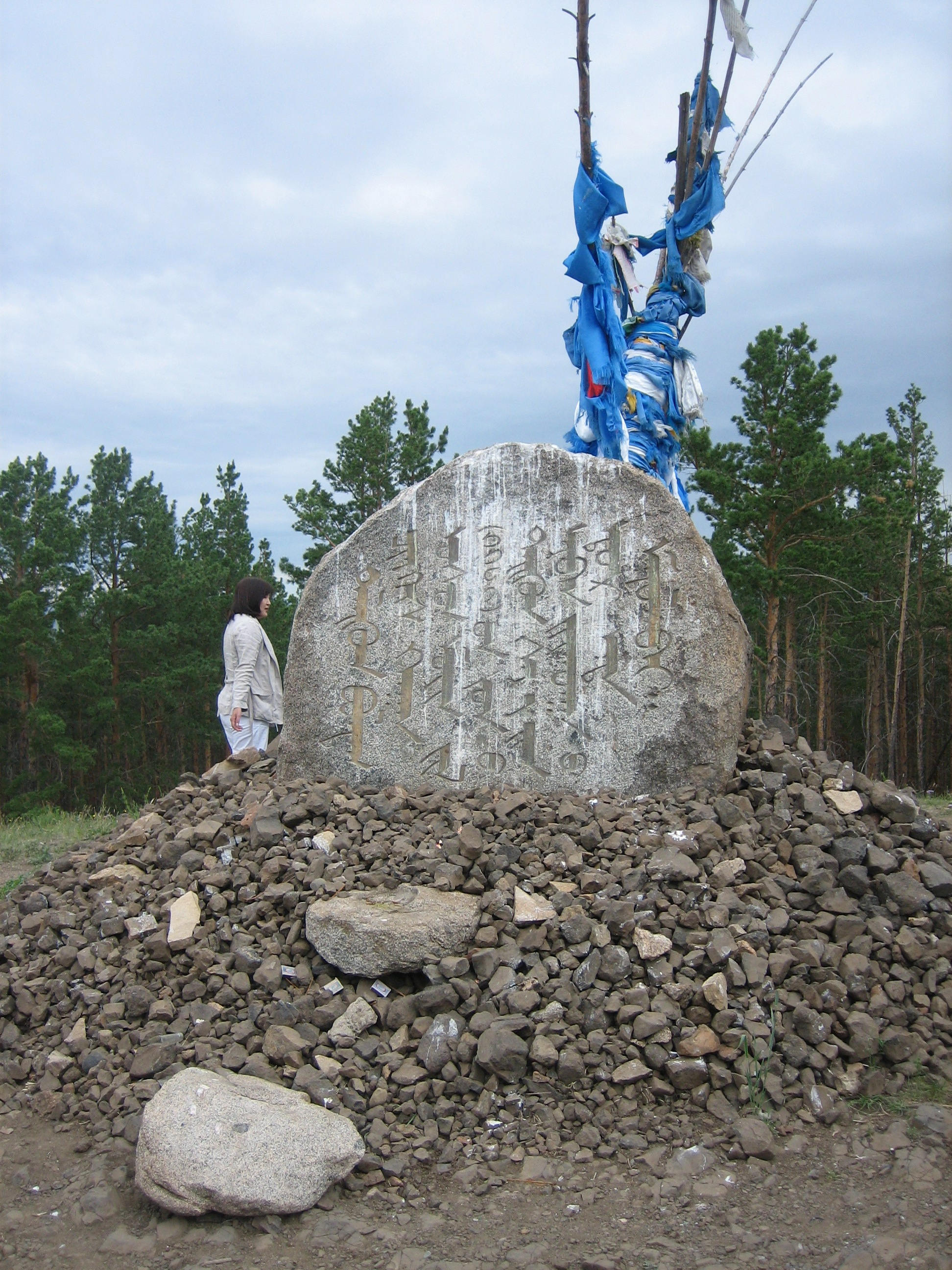
Ovoo and monument at the site

Dulüün-Boldog, or Delun-Boldog, is a tourist attraction located in Dadal, Khentii, in Onon-Balj National Park, Mongolia. It is one of several locations that is considered to be the birthplace of Genghis Khan (Temüjin), in the year 1162 CE, according to The Secret History of the Mongols. It is located near the sacred mountain Burkhan Khaldun and the Onon and Kherlen Rivers, close to Ulaanbaatar.
