= Menza, Zabaykalsky Krai =

Menza Менза
- Selo
- Location within Zabaykalsky Krai Location within Russia
- Coordinates: 49°25′N 108°51′E
- Country: Russia
- Region: Zabaykalsky Krai
- District: Krasnochikoysky District
- Time zone: UTC+9:00

Menza (Russian: Менза) is a rural locality (a selo) in Krasnochikoysky District, Zabaykalsky Krai, Russia. Population: 269 (2021 census); 339 (2010 census); 395 (2002 census); There are 7 streets in this selo.

== Geography ==
This rural locality is located 104 km from Krasny Chikoy (the district's administrative centre), 443 km from Chita (capital of Zabaykalsky Krai) and 5,200 km from Moscow. Ukyr is the nearest rural locality.
