= Menza =

Menza may refer to:

- Don Menza
- Nick Menza
- Menza (river), a river in Mongolia and Russia
