= Stanovik =

Stanovik may refer to:

- Olyokma-Stanovik, a mountain system in northern / central Zabaykalsky Krai
  - Olyokma-Stanovik Range, a subrange of the Olyokma-Stanovik
- Toko-Stanovik, a subrange of the Stanovoy Range in the border of Amur Oblast, Yakutia and Khabarovsk Krai
- Stanovik Range, a mountain chain in southern Zabaykalsky Krai near the border with Mongolia
