= Afonkino =

Afonkino Афонькино
- Selo
- Location within Zabaykalsky Krai Location within Russia
- Coordinates: 50°34′N 110°06′E
- Country: Russia
- Region: Zabaykalsky Krai
- District: Krasnochikoysky District
- Time zone: UTC+9:00

Afonkino (Russian: Афонькино) is a rural locality (a selo) in Krasnochikoysky District, Zabaykalsky Krai, Russia. Population: 202 (2021 census); 251 (2010 census); 265 (2002 census); There are 3 streets in this selo.

== Geography ==
This rural locality is located 99 km from Krasny Chikoy (the district's administrative centre), 289 km from Chita (capital of Zabaykalsky Krai) and 5,152 km from Moscow. Cheremkhovo is the nearest rural locality.
