= Cheremkhovo, Ulyotovsky District, Zabaykalsky Krai =

Cheremkhovo Черемхово
- Selo
- Location within Zabaykalsky Krai Location within Russia
- Coordinates: 51°27′N 112°43′E
- Country: Russia
- Region: Zabaykalsky Krai
- District: Ulyotovsky District
- Time zone: UTC+9:00

Cheremkhovo (Russian: Черемхово) is a rural locality (a selo) in Ulyotovsky District, Zabaykalsky Krai, Russia. Population: 437 (2021 census); 467 (2010 census); There are 10 streets in this selo.

== Geography ==
This rural locality is located 20 km from Ulyoty (the district's administrative centre), 83 km from Chita (capital of Zabaykalsky Krai) and 5,226 km from Moscow. Khadakta is the nearest rural locality.
