= Golets Sokhondo =

Mountain in Russia

- Голец Сохондо
- Location within Zabaykalsky Krai

Highest point
- Elevation: 2,504 m (8,215 ft)
- Prominence: 933.9 m (3,064 ft)
- Coordinates: 49°43′12″N 111°05′06″E

Geography
- Location: Zabaykalsky Krai, Russian Far East
- Parent range: Khentei Range, Khentei-Daur Highlands

Climbing
- First ascent: Nikita Sokolov, August 1776

Golets Sokhondo (Russian: Голец Сохондо) is a mountain in the Khentei Range, Khentei-Daur Highlands. Administratively it is part of Zabaykalsky Krai, Russian Federation.

The Sokhondo Nature Reserve, a protected area surrounding the mountain, was named after this emblematic summit when it was established on 11 December 1973.

== Geography ==
This 2,504 m (8,215 ft) high mountain is one of the highest points of the Khentei-Daur Highlands, part of the South Siberian System of ranges. It is located in the southwestern part of the highland area, not far north from the border with Mongolia.

Golets Sokhondo is a ‘’golets’’-type of mountain with a bald peak belonging to a massif which includes a smaller summit, the 2,404 m (7,887 ft) high Little Sokhondo.

== See also ==
- List of mountains in Russia
