= Povorot =

Povorot Поворот
- Settlement
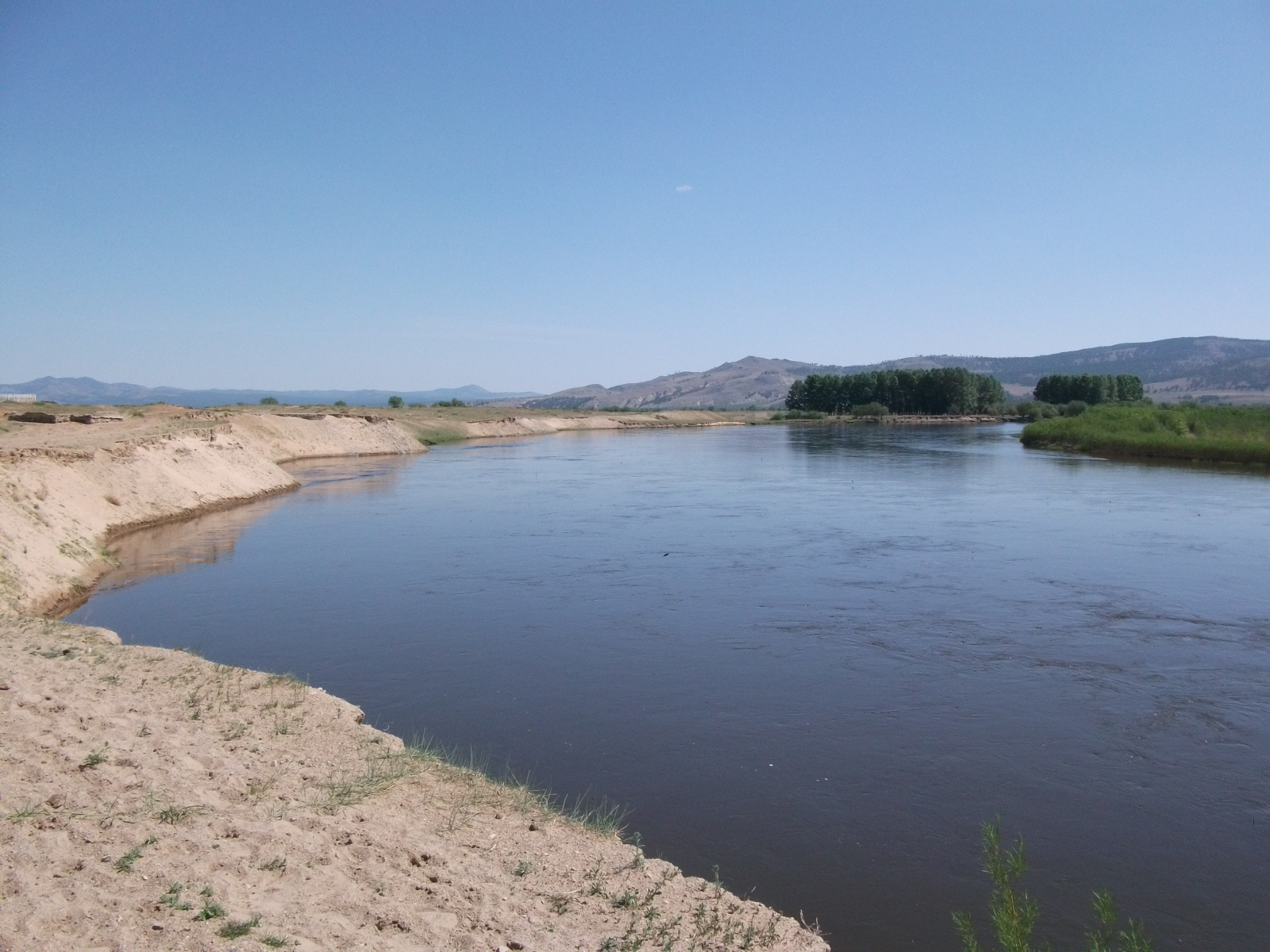
- View of the Chikoy River near Povorot

- Location within Republic of Buryatia Location within Russia
- Coordinates: 50°55′N 106°37′E
- Country: Russia
- Region: Republic of Buryatia
- District: Selenginsky District
- Time zone: UTC+8:00

Povorot (Russian: Поворот) is a rural locality (a settlement) in Selenginsky District, Republic of Buryatia, Russia. The population was 181 as of 2010. There are 5 streets.

== Geography ==
Povorot is located 46 km south of Gusinoozyorsk (the district's administrative centre) by road. Novoselenginsk is the nearest rural locality.
