= Aga (river) =

- Native name: Ага (Russian)

Location
- Country: Russia

Physical characteristics
- Mouth: Onon
  - coordinates: 51°31′53″N 115°50′8″E
- Length: 167 km (104 mi)
- Basin size: 8,000 km^{2} (3,100 sq mi)

Basin features
- Progression: Onon→ Shilka→ Amur→ Sea of Okhotsk

The Aga (Russian: Ага; Buryat: Ага гол, Aga gol) is a river in Zabaykalsky Krai in Russia. It flows into the Onon. It is 167 kilometres (104 mi) long, and has a drainage basin of 8,000 square kilometres (3,100 sq mi).
