= Bolshakovo, Zabaykalsky Krai =

Bolshakovo Большаково
- Selo
- Location within Zabaykalsky Krai Location within Russia
- Coordinates: 50°27′N 109°01′E
- Country: Russia
- Region: Zabaykalsky Krai
- District: Krasnochikoysky District
- Time zone: UTC+9:00

Bolshakovo (Russian: Большаково) is a rural locality (a selo) in Krasnochikoysky District, Zabaykalsky Krai, Russia. Population: 106 (2021 census); 125 (2010 census); 127 (2002 census); There is 1 street in this selo.

== Geography ==
This rural locality is located 22 km from Krasny Chikoy (the district's administrative centre), 362 km from Chita (capital of Zabaykalsky Krai) and 5,090 km from Moscow. Bykovo is the nearest rural locality.
