= Khentei Range =

Mountain range in Russia

- Хэнтэй
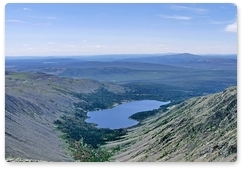
- Glacial lake in the Khentei Range

Highest point
- Peak: Golets Sokhondo
- Elevation: 2,500 m (8,200 ft)

Dimensions
- Length: 150 km (93 mi) NE/SW
- Width: 55 km (34 mi) SE/NW

Geography
- Location within Zabaykalsky Krai
- Country: Russia
- Krai: Zabaykalsky Krai
- Range coordinates: 50°0′N 111°15′E
- Parent range: Khentei-Daur Highlands

Geology
- Rock ages: Paleozoic and Jurassic

The Khentei Range (Russian: Хэнтэй) is a mountain range in the Transbaikal Region (Zabaykalsky Krai) of Siberia, Russia.

The range is part of the Trans-Baikal conifer forests ecoregion. The Sokhondo Nature Reserve is located in the area of the range.

== Geography ==
The Khentei Range is part of the Khentei-Daur Highlands, South Siberian System. It rises on the right bank of the upper course of the Ingoda River and stretches roughly northeastwards for over 150 kilometers (93 mi) until the source of the Bylir River, where it joins with the Stanovik Range. The maximum width of the range is 55 kilometers (34 mi). Its southern spurs connect with the Onon-Baldzhin Range and in the west with the Pereval Range.

The predominant summits of the Khentei Range reach between 2,000 meters (6,600 ft) and 2,200 meters (7,200 ft). The highest point is 2,500 meters (8,200 ft) high Mount Golets Sokhondo, a ‘’golets’’-type of mountain with a bald peak. Other important peaks are Buryktyn-Yang (2,244 meters (7,362 ft)) and Uluri Golets (2,161 meters (7,090 ft)). The relief is marked by a strong degree of horizontal and vertical dissection with numerous faults. Scree slopes and cliffs are common throughout the range. In some places there are traces of Pleistocene glaciation and lakes of glacial origin.

== Flora ==
The slopes of the range are covered with mountain taiga and pre-Alpine forest. The higher elevations have dwarf cedar shrub and are often crowned by "golets" type bare and largely rocky summits.

== See also ==
- Sokhondo Nature Reserve
