= Baykhor =

Baykhor Байхор
- Selo
- Location within Zabaykalsky Krai Location within Russia
- Coordinates: 50°17′N 108°34′E
- Country: Russia
- Region: Zabaykalsky Krai
- District: Krasnochikoysky District
- Time zone: UTC+9:00

Baykhor (Russian: Байхор) is a rural locality (a selo) in Krasnochikoysky District, Zabaykalsky Krai, Russia. Population: 237 (2021 census); 293 (2010 census); 369 (2002 census); There are 4 streets in this selo.

== Geography ==
This rural locality is located 14 km from Krasny Chikoy (the district's administrative centre), 399 km from Chita (capital of Zabaykalsky Krai) and 5,077 km from Moscow. Mostovka is the nearest rural locality.
