= Borzya (river) =

Location
- Country: Russia

Physical characteristics
- Mouth: Onon
  - coordinates: 50.6303°N 115.6619°E
- Length: 304 km (189 mi)
- Basin size: 7,080 km^{2} (2,730 sq mi)

Basin features
- Progression: Onon→ Shilka→ Amur→ Sea of Okhotsk

The Borzya (Russian: Борзя from Mongolian "Боорж/Boorj") is a river in Zabaykalsky Krai, Russia. The town of Borzya lies along the river. It is a right tributary of the Onon (in Amur's basin). It is 304 kilometres (189 mi) long, with a drainage basin of 7,080 square kilometres (2,730 mi^{2}).

In 1918, multiple Communists attempted to destroy the bridge over the Borzya, however, the plan failed due to weather conditions.

== Geography ==
The Borzya has its sources in the Kukulbey Mountains. It flows through a wide, swampy valley in a steppe landscape. The river's waters comes mainly from rain, and there are periodic flooding in the summer. The river sometimes dries up completely. The average discharge is 2.8 cubic metres per second (99 cu ft/s).
