= Sokhondo Nature Reserve =

Nature reserve in Chita Oblast, Russia

- Russian: Сохондинский заповедник (Also: Sokhondinskiy)
- IUCN category Ia (strict nature reserve)
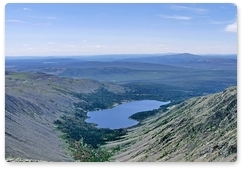
- Glacial lake in the Sokhondo area

- Location within Russia
- Location: Chita Oblast
- Nearest city: Chita
- Coordinates: 49°41′37″N 111°5′27″E
- Area: 210,985 hectares (521,355 acres)
- Established: 1973
- Governing body: Ministry of Natural Resources and Environment (Russia)
- Website: http://sokhondo.ru/

Sokhondo Nature Reserve (Russian: Сохондинский заповедник) (also Sokhondinskiy) is a Russian 'zapovednik' (strict nature reserve) in the south of Eastern Siberia, 25 km north of the border with Mongolia. It is the farthest source of the Amur River, and is centered on the Sokhondo Mountain massif (2,508 metres (8,228 ft)), in the highest sector of the Khentei-Chikoy Highlands in the Khentei Range mountain range. The Sokhondo massif has two peaks (Big Sokhondo and Little Sokhondo), and is an ancient volcano. Also within the borders are many lakes of glacial origin. In 1985, Sokhondo was named a UNESCO MAB (Man and Biosphere) Biosphere Reserve. The reserve is situated in the Chita district of Chita Oblast.

== Topography ==
The Sokhondo Reserve is in a mountainous area of the trans-Baikal region (east of Lake Baikal). The two main peaks (Big Sokhondo and Little Sokhondo) are within 100 meters of each other in height, but are separated by rivers and valleys. To the southeast of the Sokhondo massif is the Altan-Kyra Depression, an area of Mongolian steppe character. The mountains of Sokhondo are on the continental divide between the Pacific and Arctic drainages, with some rivers flowing into the Yenisei River and north, while others flow to the Onon River which is one of the main tributaries of the Amur River to the east. Sokhondo is across the border from Onon-Balj National Park in Mongolia.

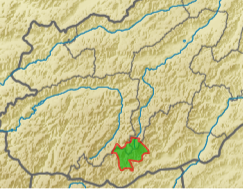
Sokhondo Zapovednik (green area), southeast of Lake Baikal

== Climate and ecoregion ==
Sokhondo is located in the Trans-Baikal conifer forests ecoregion, a region of extensive conifer forests, primarily of Dahurian larch, in the mountains and hills east and southeast of Lake Baikal.

The climate of Sokhondo is Subarctic climate, dry winter (Köppen climate classification Subarctic climate(Dwc)). This climate is characterized by mild summers (only 1–3 months above 10 °C (50.0 °F)) and cold winters having monthly precipitation less than one-tenth of the wettest summer month.

== Flora and fauna ==
Sokhondo is in the transition zone where two biogeographic zones meet: the East Siberian Taiga and Mongolian-Manchurian Steppe. The former dominates, with 85% of the reserve being forested. The light coniferous taiga is of larch (Larix gmelinii) and pine (Pinus sylvestris). The dark taiga (1,600 - 1,800 meters) is of cedar (Pinus sibirica), spruce (Picea obovata) and fir (Abies sibirica). In the upper forest belt up to 85% of the soil is covered with mosses. At the higher elevations the plant life is that of mountain tundra, with elfin cedar (Pinus pumila). In between are alpine meadows. Among the brush species, Dahurian rhododendron is common. Scientists on the reserve have recorded over 1,000 species of vascular plants.

By far the most common predator in the territory is the sable, which lives at much higher density in the reserve boundaries than in the surrounding area. It is followed by the weasel, stoat, wolf and a dozen other predators. The territory supports significant numbers of ungulates - red deer, moose, musk deer, and Siberian roe deer. Scientists on the reserve have recorded 276 species of birds, of which 168 are breeding.

== Eco-education and access ==
As a strict nature reserve, the Sokhondo Reserve is mostly closed to the general public, although scientists and those with 'environmental education' purposes can make arrangements with park management for visits. There are nine 'ecotourist' routes in the reserve, however, that are open to the public. These require permits to be obtained in advance. The main office is in the village of Kyra, Russia.

== See also ==
- List of Russian Nature Reserves (class 1a 'zapovedniks')
