= Steklozavod =

Steklozavod Стеклозавод
- Selo
- Location within Zabaykalsky Krai Location within Russia
- Coordinates: 50°00′N 108°00′E
- Country: Russia
- Region: Zabaykalsky Krai
- District: Krasnochikoysky District
- Time zone: UTC+9:00

Steklozavod (Russian: Стеклозавод) is a rural locality (a selo) in Krasnochikoysky District, Zabaykalsky Krai, Russia. Population: 57 (2021 census); 52 (2010 census); 80 (2002 census); There is 1 street in this selo.

== Geography ==
This rural locality is located 109 km from Krasny Chikoy (the district's administrative centre), 280 km from Chita (capital of Zabaykalsky Krai) and 5,160 km from Moscow. Ust-Yamarovka is the nearest rural locality.
