= Bolshaya Rechka, Zabaykalsky Krai =

Bolshaya Rechka Большая Речка
- Selo
- Location within Zabaykalsky Krai Location within Russia
- Coordinates: 50°34′N 109°58′E
- Country: Russia
- Region: Zabaykalsky Krai
- District: Krasnochikoysky District
- Time zone: UTC+9:00

Bolshaya Rechka (Russian: Большая Речка) is a rural locality (a selo) in Krasnochikoysky District, Zabaykalsky Krai, Russia. Population: 4 (2021 census); 8 (2010 census); 714 (2002 census); There is 1 street in this selo.

== Geography ==
This rural locality is located 33 km from Krasny Chikoy (the district's administrative centre), 416 km from Chita (capital of Zabaykalsky Krai) and 5,088 km from Moscow. Margintuy is the nearest rural locality.
