= Onon-Balj National Park =

National park in Khentii, Mongolia

- Mongolian: Онон Балжийн байгалийн цогцолборт газар Mongolian: ᠣᠨᠤᠨ ᠪᠠᠯᠵᠤ‌ ᠶᠢᠨ ᠪᠠᠶᠢᠭᠠᠯᠢ ᠶᠢᠨ ᠴᠣᠭᠴᠠᠯᠠᠪᠤᠷᠢᠲᠤ ᠭᠠᠵᠠᠷ
- IUCN category II (national park)
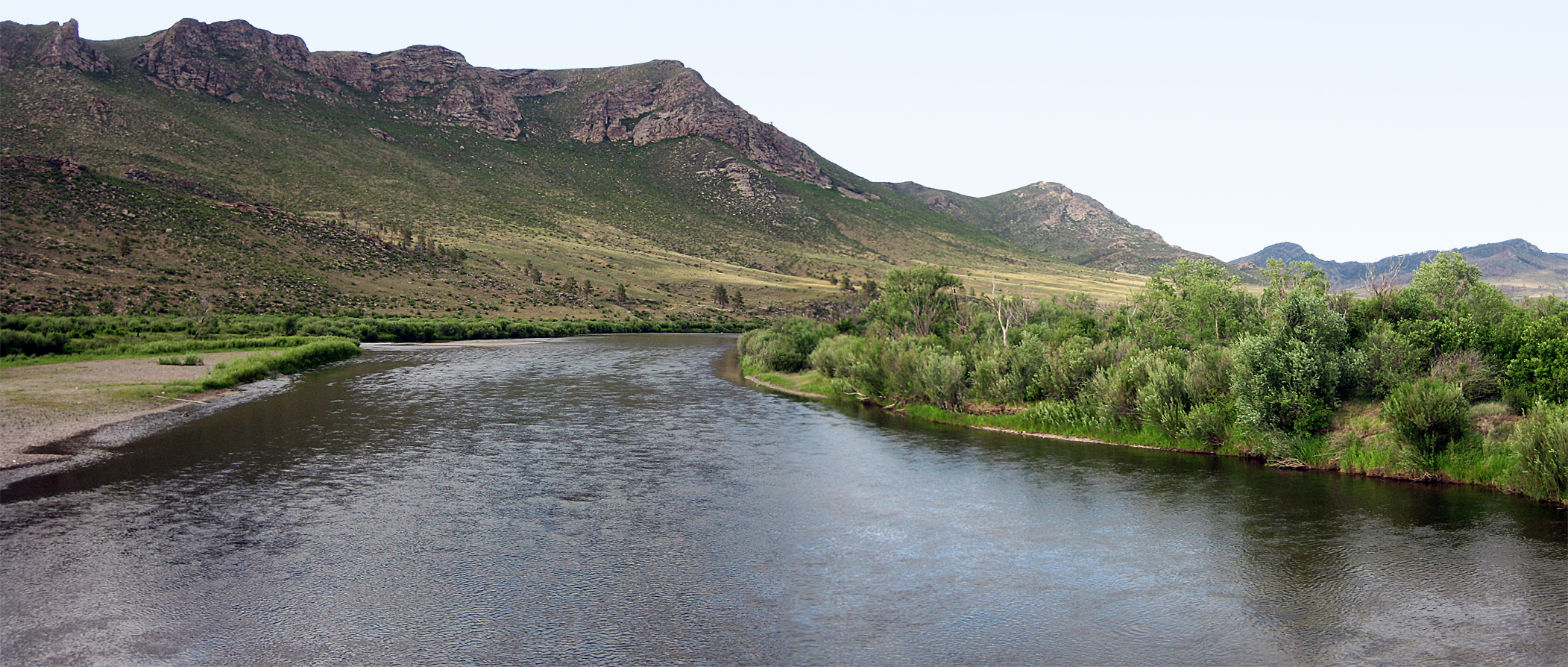
- Onon River

- Location within Mongolia
- Location: Khentii, Mongolia
- Nearest city: Dadal
- Coordinates: 48.98°N 111.1°E
- Area: 4,158 square kilometres (1,605 sq mi)
- Established: 2000
- Governing body: Ministry of Environment and Green Development of Mongolia

Onon-Balj National Park (Mongolian: Онон-Балжийн байгалийн цогцолборт газар، [Onon-Balžijn bajgalijn cogcolbort gazar]؛ ᠭᠣᠪᠢ ᠭᠤᠷᠪᠠᠨ ᠰᠠᠶᠢᠬᠠᠨ ᠪᠠᠶᠢᠭᠠᠯᠢ ᠶᠢᠨ ᠴᠣᠭᠴᠠᠯᠠᠪᠤᠷᠢᠲᠤ ᠭᠠᠵᠠᠷ، [ɣobi onun balju-yin bayaɣli-yin čoɣčalaburitu ɣajar]) covers two sectors of the Onon River valley as it flows north from Mongolia into Russia. The region is in the transition zone between the Siberian conifer forests of the north and the Daurian steppe and forest steppe of Mongolia. The area is one of relatively high biodiversity, and is also historically and culturally important for its association with Genghis Khan. The park is located in the far northeast of Khentii Province, 280 km northeast of Ulaanbaatar.

== Topography ==
The park covers mid-sized mountains and confluence of the Onon and Balj Rivers. Elevations range from 840 meters at the Onon River, to 1,568 meters at Kentsuu Mountain. The mountains generally have rounded tops and mild slopes.

== Climate and ecoregion ==
The climate of the area is Cold semi-arid climate (Köppen climate classification (BSk)). This climate is characteristic of steppe climates intermediary between desert humid climates, and typically have precipitation is above evapotranspiration. At least one month averages below 0 °C (32 °F). The park is in southern extent of the Trans-Baikal conifer forests ecoregion.

== Flora and fauna ==
Vegetation varies with river courses - willow groves, floodplain and riparian forests - and with altitude on the mountains - steppe and forest steppe. The forests are characterized by pine and larch trees. A significant threat to habitat in the park is currently forest fires. The park has been designated an Important Bird Area by BirdLife International; birds known to breed there include the vulnerable Swan Goose (Anser cygnoides), Lesser kestrel (Falco naumanni), and the vulnerable White-naped crane (Antigone vipio). Mammals include the Daurian ground squirrel and the Raccoon dog.

== See also ==
- List of national parks of Mongolia
- Sokhondo Nature Reserve
