= Kitoy Goltsy =

Mountain range in Russia

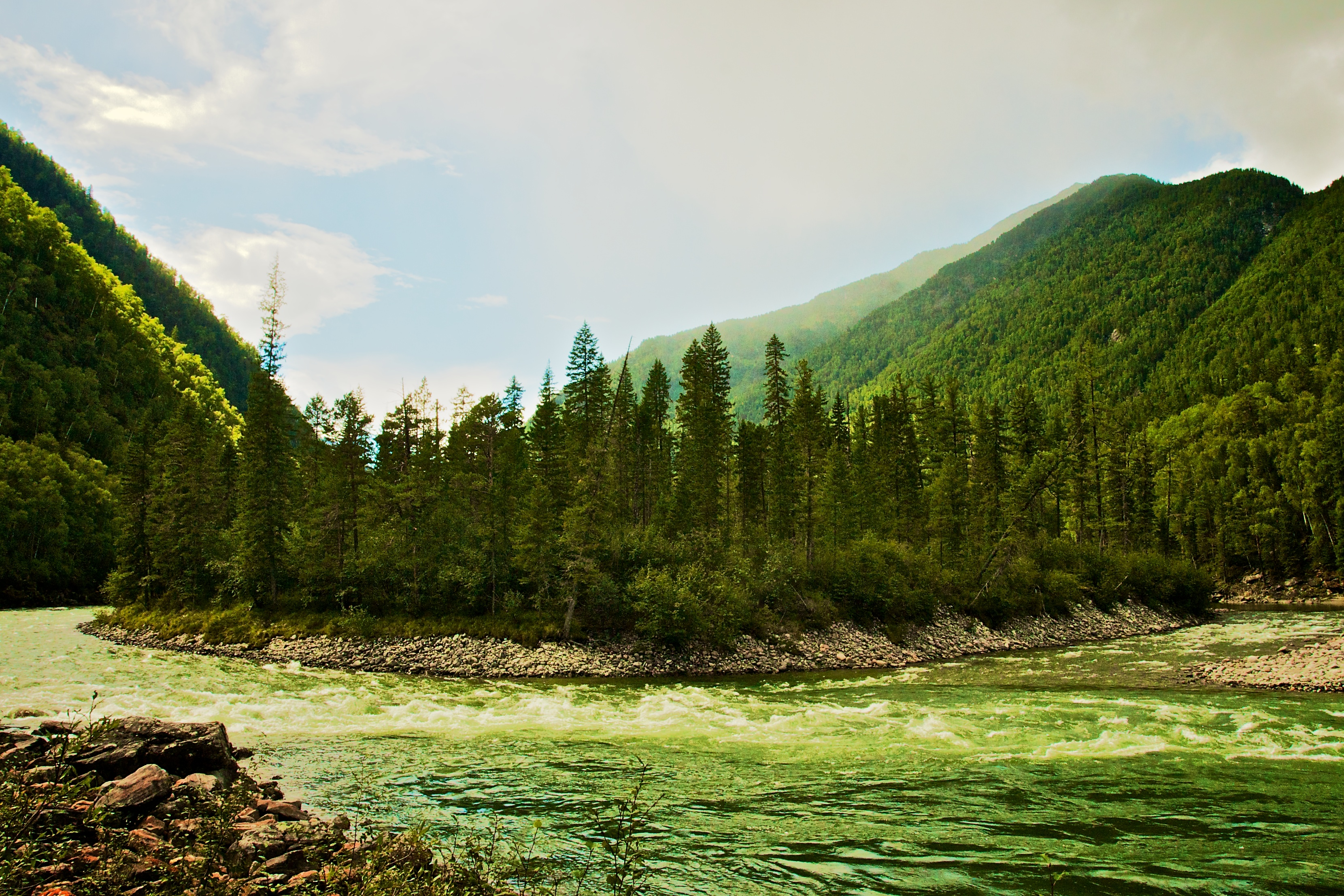

Highest point
- Peak: Ospinsky Golets
- Elevation: 3,215 m (10,548 ft)
- Coordinates: 52°00′N 101°30′E

Dimensions
- Length: 180 km (110 mi)

Naming
- Native name: Китойские гольцы (Russian)

Geography
- Location within Republic of Buryatia
- Location: Buryatia, Russia
- Parent range: Eastern Sayan Mountains

The Kitoy Goltsy (Russian: Китойские гольцы) is a mountain range in Siberia, Russia, part of the Eastern Sayan Mountains. The range is about 180 km (110 mi) long. Its highest summit, Ospinsky Golets, is 3,215 m (10,548 ft) high.

Rivers in Kitoy Goltsy include the Kitoy River and other tributaries of the Angara River.

== See also ==
- List of mountains and hills of Russia
- Golets (geography)
