= Chikoy National Park =

Conservation area in Chukotka, Russia

- Чикой (Russian)
- IUCN category II (national park)
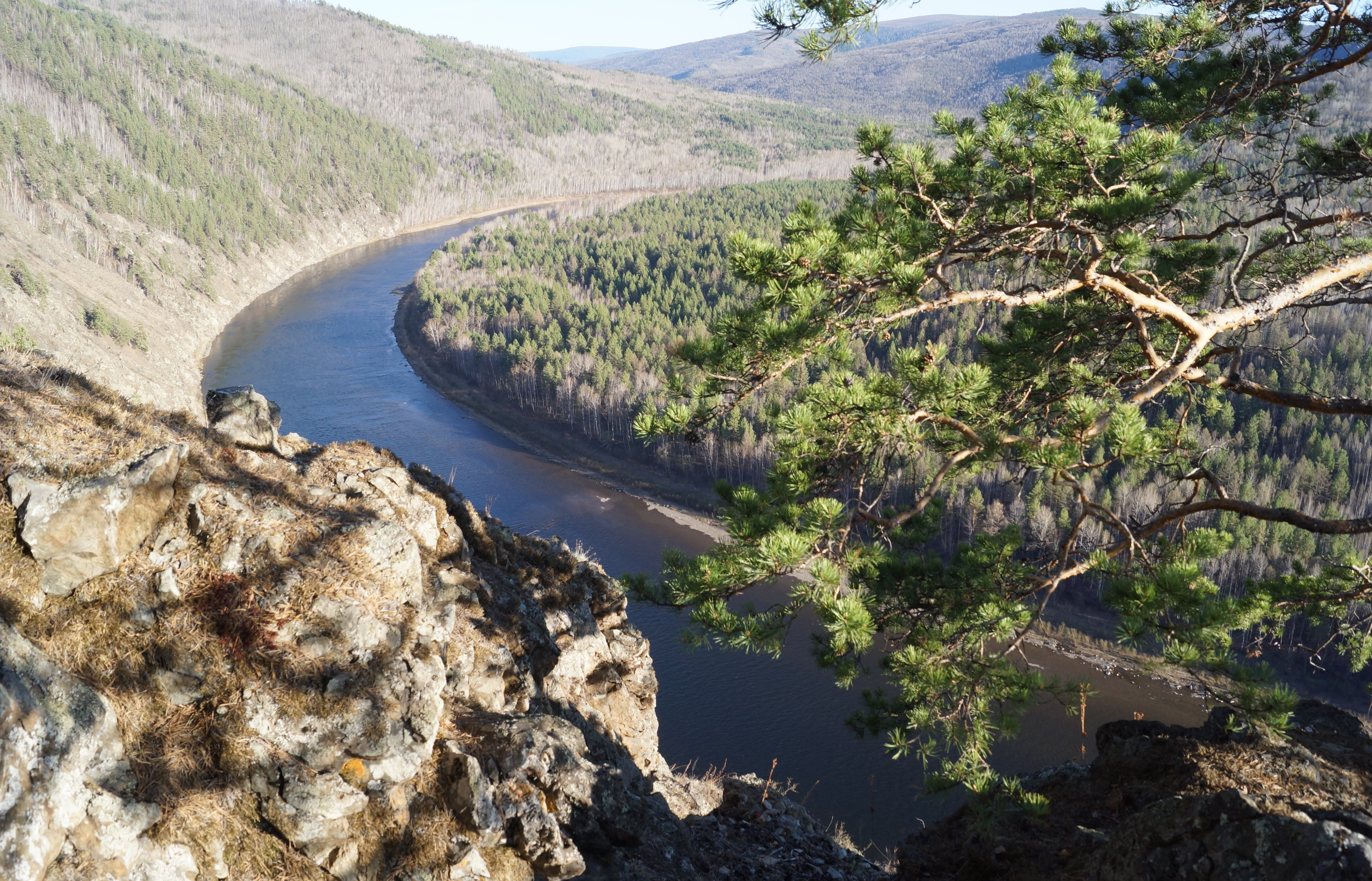
- Chikoy National Park

- Location within Russia
- Location: Chukotka Autonomous Okrug
- Nearest city: Anadyr
- Coordinates: 49°46′N 110°18′E
- Area: 666,468 hectares (1,646,878 acres; 6,665 km^{2}; 2,573 sq mi)
- Established: 2014
- Governing body: Ministry of Natural Resources and Environment (Russia)
- Website: http://np-chikoi.ru/

Chikoy National Park (Russian: Чикой, национальный парк) was officially created in 2014, on the mountain-steppe border region of south-central Siberia and Mongolia. It is in the Krasnochikoysky District of the Zabaykalsky ("Trans-Baikal") administrative region of Russia. This places the park about 250 miles southeast of Lake Baikal, on the edge of the Lake Baikal ecoregion. The stated purpose for creating the park is the "preservation of unique natural complexes in the upper reaches of the river Chikoy". While tourism and sport fishing will be encouraged, hunting and roads will be prohibited.

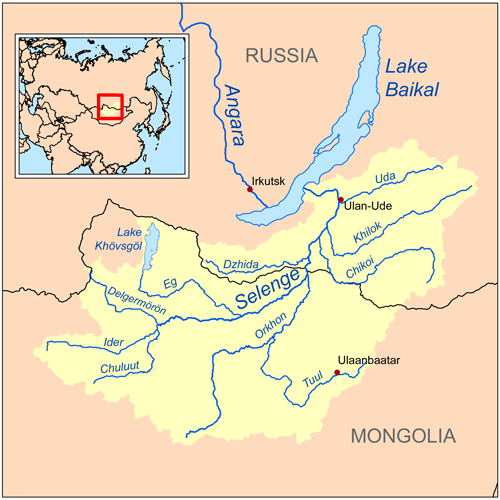
Tributaries of the Selenga River, with the Chikoy River on the right, and location of Chikoy National Park

== Geography ==
The national park is located in the Khentei-Daur Highlands, in the upper reaches of the Chikoy River of the Baikal Basin. The natural monument mountain Bystrinsky Golets, highest point of the Chikokon Range and of the highlands, is located in the park area.

== Ecoregion and climate ==
This is part of the Daurian forest steppe ecoregion. The park is in the transition zone between the Siberian taiga to the north and Mongolian steppe to the south. The area is one of pine forests, mountain, steppe, and alpine meadows.

The climate of Chikoy is Subarctic climate, dry winter (Köppen climate classification subarctic climate. This climate is characterized by mild summers (only 1–3 months above 10 °C (50.0 °F)) and cold winters having monthly precipitation less than one-tenth of the wettest summer month.

== See also ==
- Protected areas of Russia
- Buryatia
