= Zakharovo, Zabaykalsky Krai =

Zakharovo Захарово
- Selo
- Location within Zabaykalsky Krai Location within Russia
- Coordinates: 50°32′N 109°23′E
- Country: Russia
- Region: Zabaykalsky Krai
- District: Krasnochikoysky District
- Time zone: UTC+9:00

Zakharovo (Russian: Захарово) is a rural locality (a selo) in Krasnochikoysky District, Zabaykalsky Krai, Russia. Population: 597 (2021 census); 699 (2010 census); 746 (2002 census); There are 6 streets in this selo.

== Geography ==
This rural locality is located 49 km from Krasny Chikoy (the district's administrative centre), 335 km from Chita (capital of Zabaykalsky Krai) and 5,105 km from Moscow. Osinovka is the nearest rural locality.
