= Bystrinsky Golets =

Mountain in Russia

- Быстринский Голец
- Location within Zabaykalsky Krai

Highest point
- Elevation: 2,519 m (8,264 ft)
- Coordinates: 49°43′0″N 109°57′0″E

Geography
- Location: Zabaykalsky Krai, Russian Far East
- Parent range: Chikokon Range, Khentei-Daur Highlands

Bystrinsky Golets (Russian: Быстринский Голец), also known as Barun-Shabartuy, is a mountain in the Chikokon Range. Administratively it is part of Zabaykalsky Krai, Russian Federation.

The mountain was officially declared a natural monument in 1988.

== Geography ==
This 2,519 m (8,264 ft) high mountain is the highest point of the Khentei-Daur Highlands, part of the South Siberian System of ranges. It is located in the western part of the highlands, just a little north of the border with Mongolia. the Bystrinsky Golets is a ‘’golets’’-type of mountain with a bald peak that rises just above the source of the Chikoy River. The Bystrinsky Golets is part of the Chikoy National Park.

== See also ==
- List of mountains in Russia
