= Menza (river) =

River in Mongolia and Russia

Menza Mongolian: Минж гол Russian: Менза
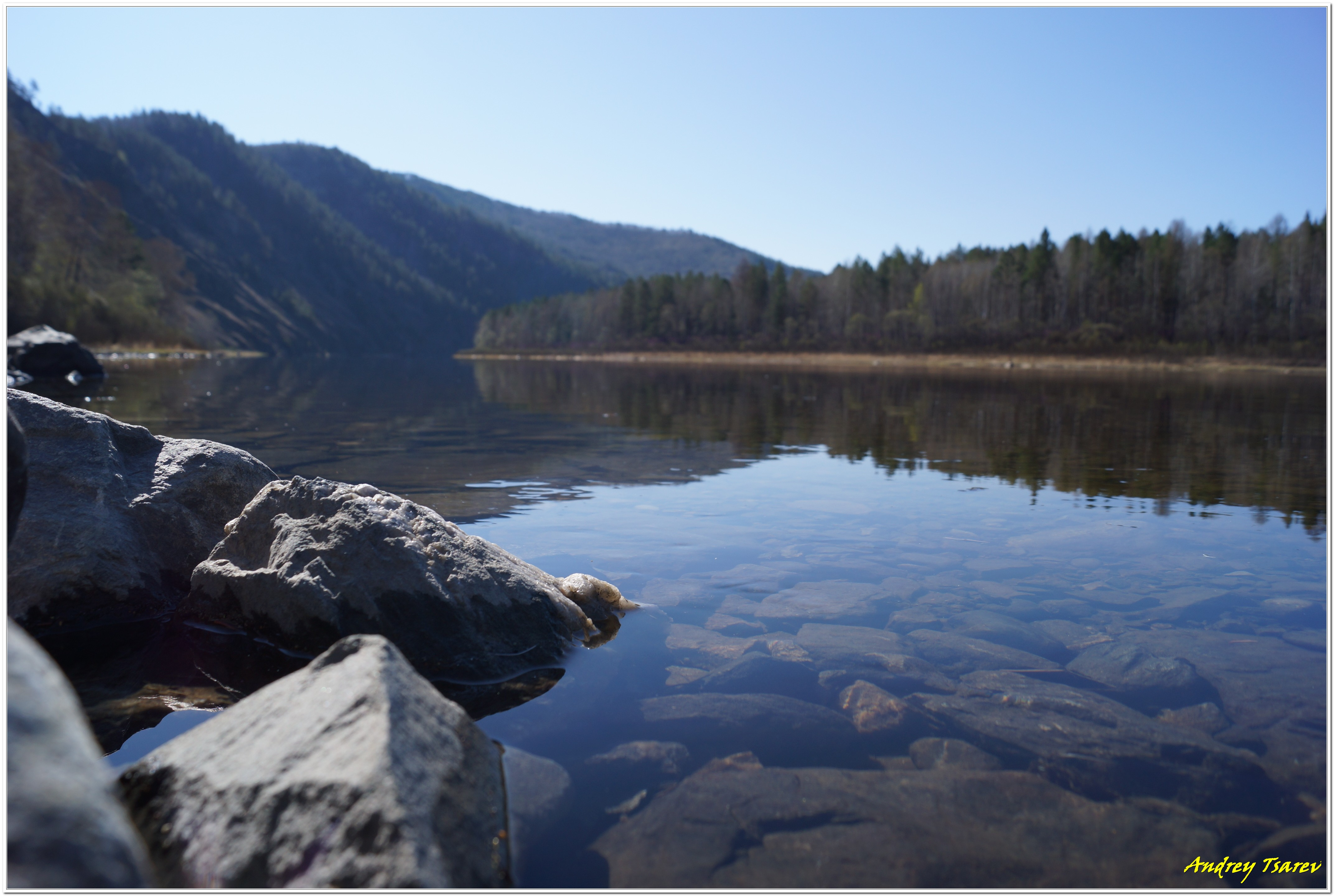
- View of the river

- Mouth location in Transbaikal Krai, Russia

Location
- Countries: Russia, Mongolia
- Province and Federal subject: Töv Province and Transbaikal Krai

Physical characteristics
- Source
  - location: Khentii Mountains
  - coordinates: 48°36′29″N 108°19′26″E
- Mouth: Chikoy
  - coordinates: 50°13′35″N 108°36′30″E
- Length: 337 km (209 mi)
- Basin size: 13,800 km^{2} (5,300 sq mi)

Basin features
- Progression: Chikoy→ Selenga→ Lake Baikal→ Angara→ Yenisey→ Kara Sea

The Menza (Russian: Менза; Mongolian: Минж гол) is a river in Zabaykalsky Krai in Russia, and Töv Province, Mongolia. It is the largest tributary of the Chikoy. Its length is 337 kilometres (209 mi). The area of its basin is 13,800 square kilometres (5,300 mi^{2}).

== Course ==
The Menza has its source in the northern part of the Khentii Mountains in Mongolia. It flows across mountainous areas, first northeastwards, entering Zabaykalsky Krai, then bends to the northwest across the western edge of the Khentei-Daur Highlands, joining the Chikoy on its left bank. The Burkal (Буркал) is its most important tributary.

Location of the river source in Mongolia

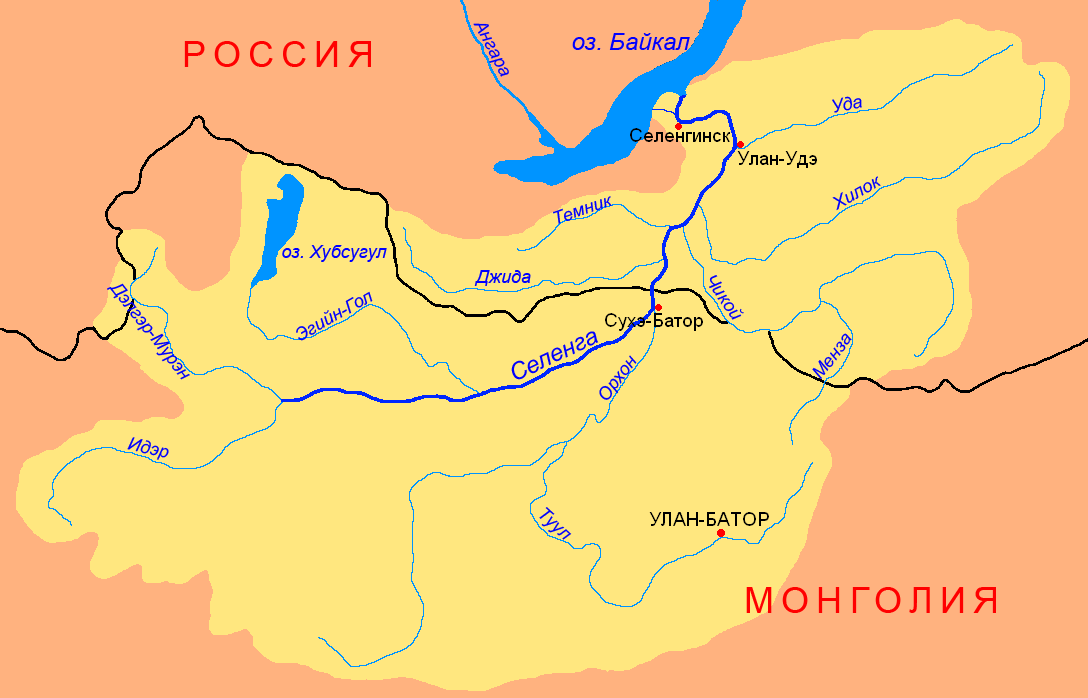
Basin of the Selenga.

== See also ==
- List of rivers of Russia
- Chikoy National Park
