= Khentei-Daur Highlands =

Mountain range in Transbaikal Krai, Russia

- Хэнтэй-Даурское нагорье
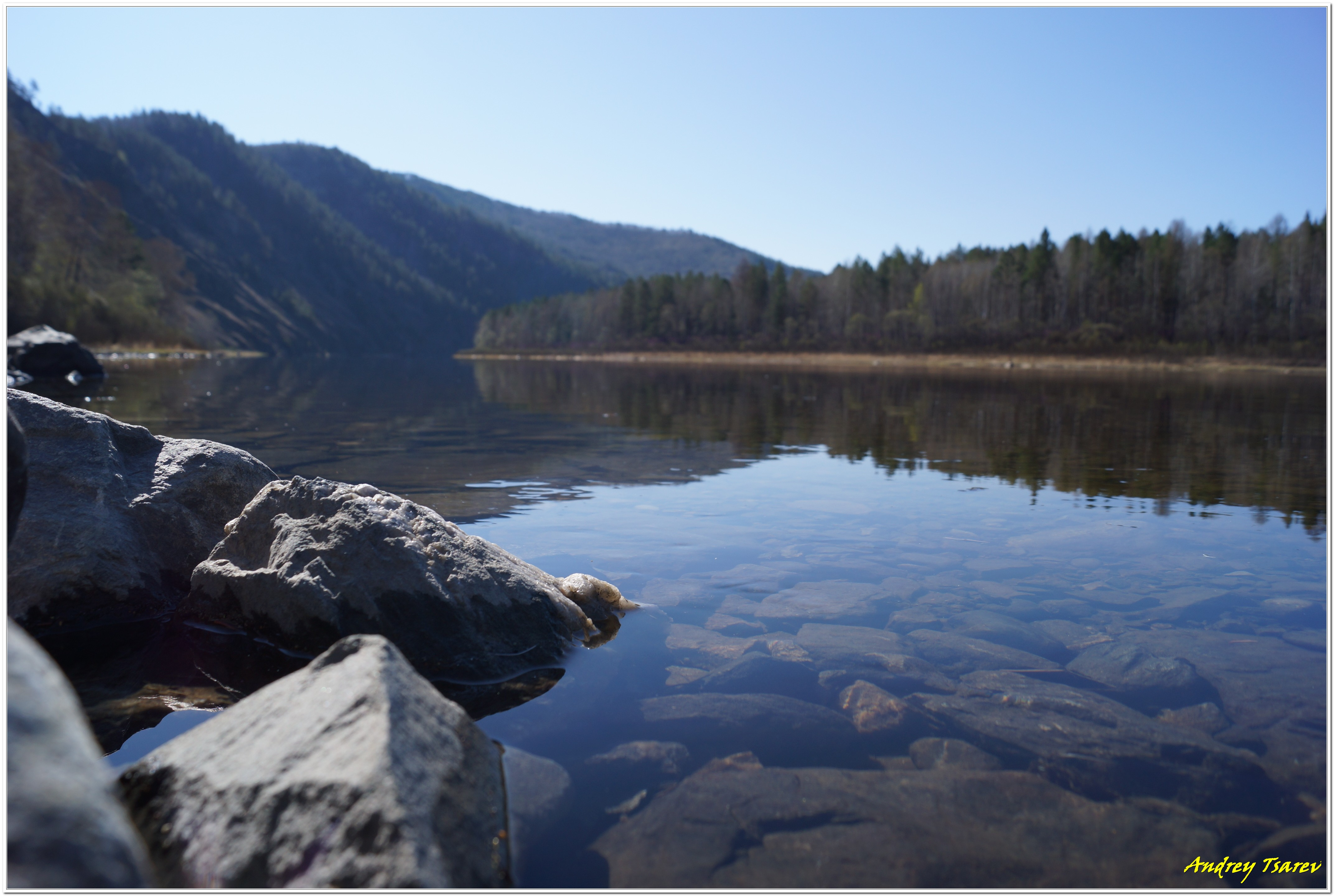
- Landscape of the Menza River

Highest point
- Peak: Bystrinsky Golets
- Elevation: 2,519 m (8,264 ft)

Dimensions
- Length: 350 km (220 mi) E/W
- Width: 140 km (87 mi) N/S

Geography
- Location within Far Eastern Federal District
- Country: Russia
- Federal subject: Zabaykalsky Krai
- Range coordinates: 50°N 110°E
- Parent range: South Siberian System
- Borders on: Mongolia

Geology
- Rock ages: Paleozoic and Permian

Climbing
- Easiest route: From Kyra or Krasny Chikoy

The Khentei-Daur Highlands, (Note: Russian: Хэнтэй-Даурское нагорье, pronounced [xɨnˈtɛj dɐˈurskəje nɐˈɡorʲje]) also known as the Khentei-Chikoi Highlands, (Note: Russian: Хэнтэй-Чикойское нагорье, pronounced [xɨnˈtɛj t͡ɕɪˈkojskəje nɐˈɡorʲje]) are a mountainous area in Zabaykalsky Krai, Russia.

Owing to a number of factors such as tectonic faults, rock fissuring, and density of river networks, the Khentei-Daur Highlands are the second region in the Transbaikal area regarding the formation and occurrence of aufeis (naleds) sheets.

== Geography ==
The Khentei-Daur Highlands are a mountain region located at the southwestern limits of Zabaykalsky Krai, near the border with northeastern Mongolia. They include a number of medium height mountain ranges, as well as a wide intermontane basin, the Altan-Kyrin Depression. The average height of the highland peaks is between 1,500 meters (4,900 ft) and 2,000 meters (6,600 ft). The highest point is 2,519 metres (8,264 ft) high Bystrinsky Golets, also known as Barun-Shabartuy (Бару́н-Ша́бартуй).

The area of the highlands is limited by the valley of the Chikoy River to the northwest, beyond which rises the Malkhan Range of the Selenga Highlands (Селенгинское среднегорье). The Menza River, main tributary of the Chikoy, flows to the west, and the Onon River to the east, with the Mongolian border to the south. The Daur Range (Даурский хребет) stretches northeastwards from the northeastern limit of the highlands. The mountains are characterized by steep slopes, with kurums and rocky ledges. Some of the highest ridges are crowned by goltsy-type (гольцы) bare rocky summits. There are some traces of Pleistocene glaciation in mountain ridges and river valleys across the highlands.

=== Subranges ===
The main subranges of the Khentei-Daur Highlands are:

- Menzin Range, highest point Kurepin, 2,009 metres (6,591 ft)
- Asin Range, highest point Belaya Griva, 1,870 metres (6,140 ft)
- Burkal Range, highest point Zyryanka, 1,869 metres (6,132 ft)
- Esutay Range, highest point Asakansky Golets, 2,071 metres (6,795 ft)
- Chikokon Range, highest point Bystrinsky Golets, 2,519 metres (8,264 ft), highest point of the highlands
- Zhergokon Range, highest point Zhergokonsky Golets, 1,942 metres (6,371 ft)
- Pereval Range, highest point Kumylsky Golets 2,450 metres (8,040 ft)
- Khentei Range, highest point Golets Sokhondo, 2,500 metres (8,200 ft)
- Onon-Baldzhin Range, highest point 1,749 metres (5,738 ft)
- Chatangin Range, highest point 2,232 metres (7,323 ft)
- Stanovik Range, highest point 1,916 metres (6,286 ft)

== Flora ==
The prevailing forest cover of the ranges of the Khentei-Daur Highlands is mountain taiga, as well as pre-alpine woodland, with thickets of dwarf stone pine at higher altitudes. The Sokhondo Nature Reserve of the highlands is part of the Trans-Baikal conifer forests ecoregion.

== See also ==
- Chikoy National Park
- Sokhondo Nature Reserve
- Transbaikal
