= Transbaikal conifer forests =

Ecoregion in southern Siberia and Mongolia

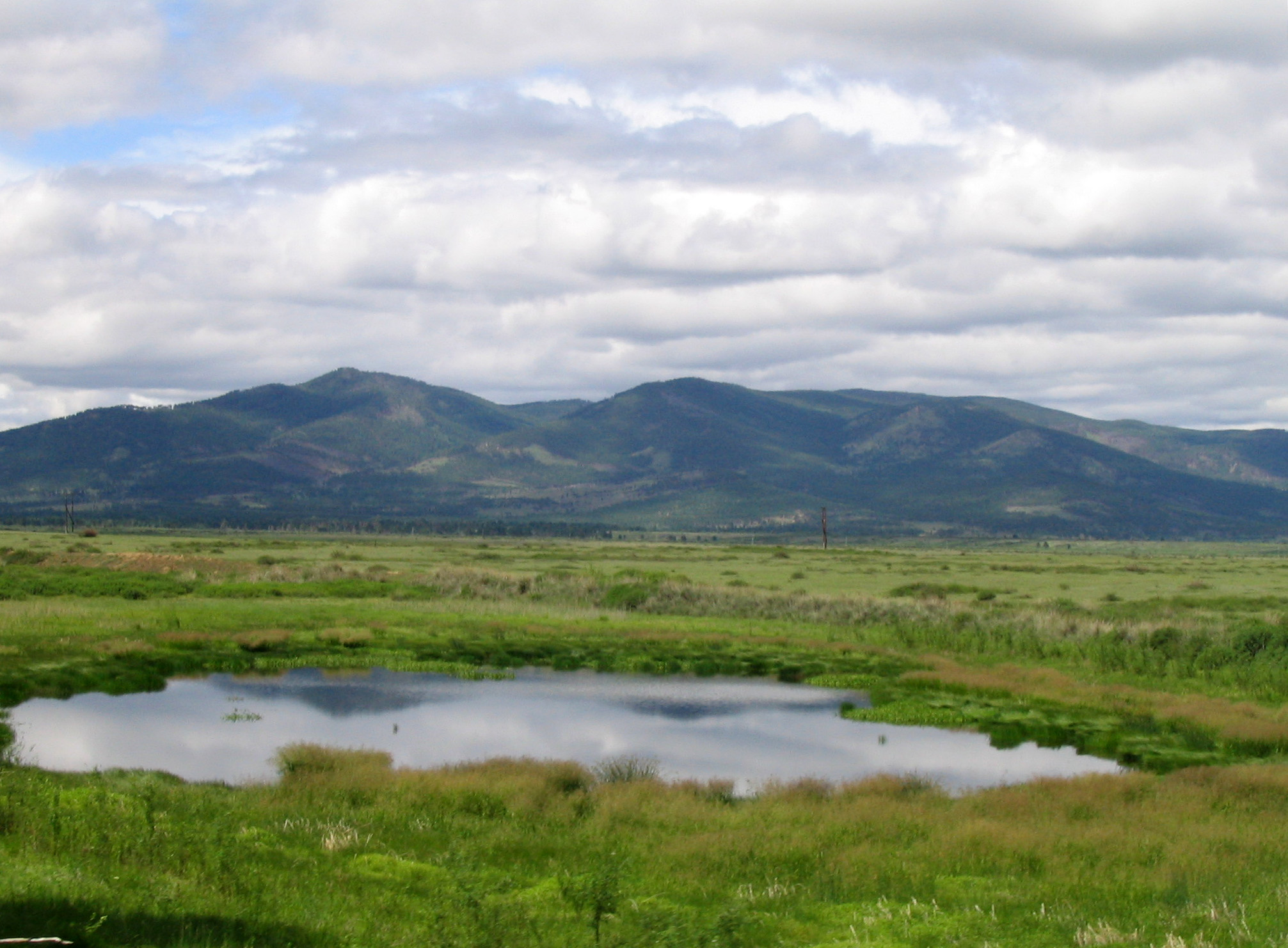
- Buryatia landscape

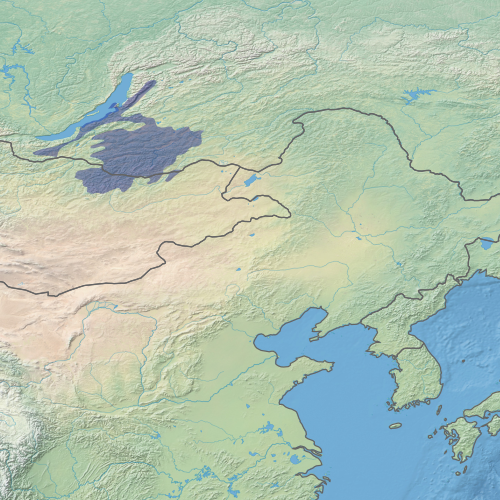
- Transbaikal conifer forests ecoregion (in purple)

Ecology
- Realm: Palearctic
- Biome: Boreal forests/taiga

Geography
- Area: 200,465 km^{2} (77,400 mi^{2})
- Countries: Russia, Mongolia
- Coordinates: 51°N 110°E
- Climate type: Subarctic, dry winters (Koppen Dwc)

The Transbaikal conifer forests ecoregion (WWF ID: PA0609) covers a 200,465 km^{2} (77,400 sq mi) region of mountainous southern taiga (boreal forests) stretching east and south from the shores of Lake Baikal in the Southern Siberia region of Russia, and including part of northern Mongolia. Historically, the area has been called "Dauria", or Transbaikal ("the land beyond Lake Baikal"). It is in the Palearctic realm, and mostly in the taiga biome with a subarctic, humid climate.

== Location and description ==
The ecoregion is centered on the Yablonoi Mountains, a range that reaches heights of 1,600 m (5,200 ft), and runs southwest to northeast, parallel to Lake Baikal. The western edge of the region is the eastern shore of Lake Baikal and the Barguzin mountain range. The city of Chita is at the northeast of the region, and the city of Ulaanbaatar, Mongolia, is just outside the southern point of the region. To the south are the Khentii Mountains in Mongolia. To the east are the temperate grasslands of the Daurian forest steppe ecoregion. To the north is the Vitim tableland.

The parallel ridges of the mountains in the region form the continental divide between rivers flowing to the Arctic Ocean (by way of Lake Baikal and the Lena River), and the Pacific Ocean (by way of the Amur River).

== Climate ==
The climate of the ecoregion is dry-winter subarctic (Köppen Dwc). This climate is characterised by long, very cold winters, and cool summers, but with little snow in the winter. The Siberian High (also called the Siberian Anticyclone) keeps the area particularly dry in winter. During the summer, the Asiatic Low brings hot air from the deserts of China and Mongolia, raising the temperature in the Transbaikal. To the east of the region, the climate grades into a dry winter humid continental climate (Dwb), with longer summers. To the south of the ecoregion in Mongolia, the climate grades into a cold semi-arid climate (Köppen BSk), with less precipitation than the Transbaikal. Precipitation in the Transbaikal ranges from 400–500 mm (16–20 in)/year in the uplands, to 200 mm (8 in)/year in the lower and more southerly areas.

Khilok, Russia

Climate chart (precipitation, max. and min. temperature)
J	F	M	A	M	J	J	A	S	O	N	D
57 −2 −7	50 −2 −9	47 3 −5	37 11 1	51 16 5	83 20 10	80 23 13	93 21 11	51 15 7	91 9 3	68 2 −3	58 −1 −6
- █ Average max. and min. temperatures in °C
- █ Precipitation totals in mm
- Source: World Weather Online
Imperial conversion
J	F	M	A	M	J	J	A	S	O	N	D
2.2 28 19	2 28 16	1.9 37 23	1.5 52 34	2 61 41	3.3 68 50	3.1 73 55	3.7 70 52	2 59 45	3.6 48 37	2.7 36 27	2.3 30 21
- █ Average max. and min. temperatures in °F
- █ Precipitation totals in inches

== Flora ==
The region is mostly forested below the 1,400 metre level. The characteristic trees on the warmer, wetter west side of the Yablonovsky Ridge are Dahurian larch (Larix gmelinii) and Siberian pine (Pinus sibirica). On the warmer and drier east of the ridge the larch is mixed with Scots pine (Pinus sylvestris). The trees are draped with moss and lichen.

The flora of the Transbaikal exhibits altitude zoning. At the lowest levels in the river valleys and lowlands (0–600 metres), the characteristic vegetation is that of the steppes: bunchgrass (Stipa capillata), fescue, junegrass (Koeleria gracilis), and Filifolium (Tanacetum sibiricum). The next level (600-1,100 m) is a forest-steppe level, and from 1,100 to 1,800 m a forest level featuring Larix gemilii and Pinus sylvestris. Above 1,800 m is shrub land of Siberian dwarf pine (Pinus pumila, dwarf birch (Betula exilis), and Juniperus pseudosibirica. Unlike the Sayan and Altai mountains to the west, the climate of the Transbaikal is too extreme to support alpine meadows; the vegetation proceeds from forest directly to higher-altitude shrubs.

== Fauna ==
The extensive tree cover provides good habitat for deer, bighorn sheep, bear, wild boar, and other large mammals.

== Freshwater ecosystems ==
The Transbaikal terrestrial ecoregion covers the "Lake Baikal" Freshwater Ecoregion (WWF ID:606). This freshwater ecoregion supports a "large lakes" habitat for aquatic life, the primary focus of scientific study being on Lake Baikal itself and fish that spawn in the rivers that feed into it (such as the Barguzin River in the Transbaikal).

== Protections ==
The Lake Baikal area on the western edge of the ecoregion is a UNESCO Man and Biosphere (MAB) Biosphere Reserve. It is also a UNESCO World Heritage Site

Three large protected areas of the Russian Federation in the Transbaikal ecoregion are:

- Baikal Nature Reserve. An IUCN class Ia "strict ecological reserve" (a Zapovednik) on the southeast shore of Lake Baikal. (Area: 1,657 km^{2})
- Barguzin Nature Reserve. An IUCN class Ia strict ecological reserve (a Zapovednik) on the eastern shore of Lake Baikal. (Area: 2,482 km^{2})
- Sokhondo Nature Reserve. An IUCN class Ia strict ecological reserve (a Zapovednik) centered on the Sokhondo Mountain massif in Chita Oblast in the south east of the ecoregion. (Area: 2,110 km^{2})

Two large protected areas of the Transbaikal are in Mongolia:

- Khan Khentii Strictly Protected Area. An IUCN class Ib "wilderness area", in the Khentii Mountains, and containing the sacred Burkhan Khaldun mountain. (Area: 12,270 km^{2})
- Onon-Balj National Park. A national park created in 2000 that protects the source of the Onon River, which is ultimately the source of the Amur River. (Area: 4,158 km^{2})

== Threats ==
Forest fires are always a threat to wooded, dry areas; drought in recent years has increased the threat of wildfire. The area also suffers from pest outbreaks and uncontrolled logging. There is also gold mining in the area, which is a threat to the streams and bogs.

== Urban areas and settlements ==
The major cities of the ecoregion are Ulan-Ude and Petrovsk-Zaybaykalsky in Republic of Buryatia, and Chita and Khilok in Zabaykalsky Krai. Otherwise, the region is sparsely populated. The Trans-Siberian Railroad bisects the region from west to east.

== See also ==
- List of ecoregions in Russia
- List of ecoregions in Mongolia
