= Chikoy (river) =

River in Mongolia and Russia

Chikoy Buryat: Сүхэ гол Mongolian: Цѳх гол Russian: Чикой
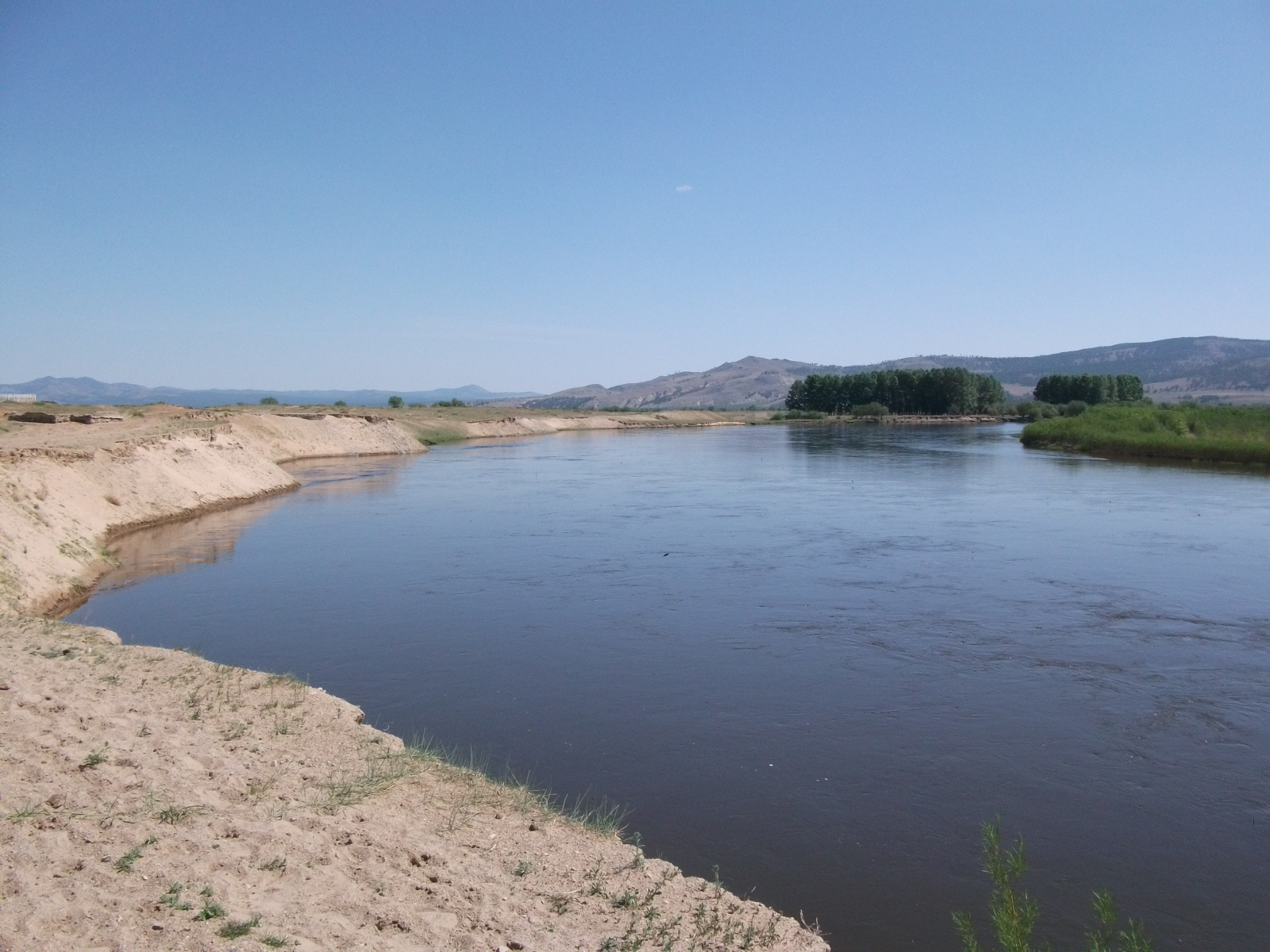
- View of the Chikoy River near Povorot village

- Location in Buryatia, Russia

Location
- Countries: Russia, Mongolia
- Federal subjects: Transbaikal Krai, Buryatia

Physical characteristics
- Source
  - location: Chikokon Range
  - coordinates: 49°37′41″N 109°56′23″E
  - elevation: ca 1,800 m (5,900 ft)
- Mouth: Selenga
  - coordinates: 51°3′28″N 106°39′4″E
  - elevation: 535 m (1,755 ft)
- Length: 769 km (478 mi)
- Basin size: 46,200 km^{2} (17,800 sq mi)

Basin features
- Progression: Selenga→ Lake Baikal→ Angara→ Yenisey→ Kara Sea

The Chikoy (Russian: Чикой; Mongolian: Цѳх гол, Tsökh gol; Buryat: Сүхэ гол, Sükhe gol) is a river in Zabaykalsky Krai and the Buryat Republic in Russia, which partially flows along the Russia-Mongolia border. It is a right tributary of the Selenga. The length of the Chikoy is 769 kilometres (478 mi). The area of its basin is 46,200 square kilometres (17,800 mi^{2}).

== Course ==
The Chikoy has its source in the Chikokon Range, in the northern slopes of the Bystrinsky Golets peak. Its valley forms the northwestern limit of the Khentei-Daur Highlands. The river usually freezes over in late October or early November and stays icebound until April or early May. Its largest tributary is the Menza.

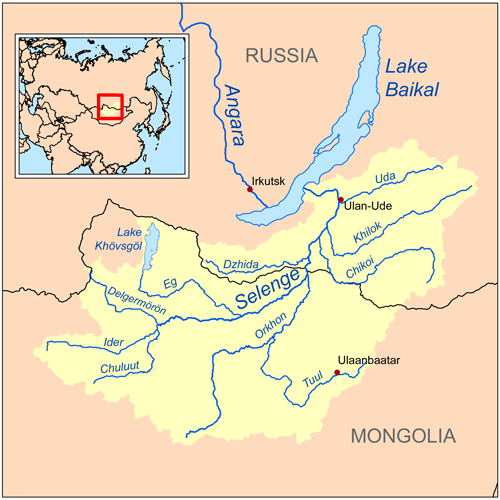
Basin of the Selenga. Chikoy river on the right (Chikoi)

== See also ==
- List of rivers of Russia
- Chikoy National Park
- Selenga Highlands
