= Golets (geography) =

Type of bald mountain summit

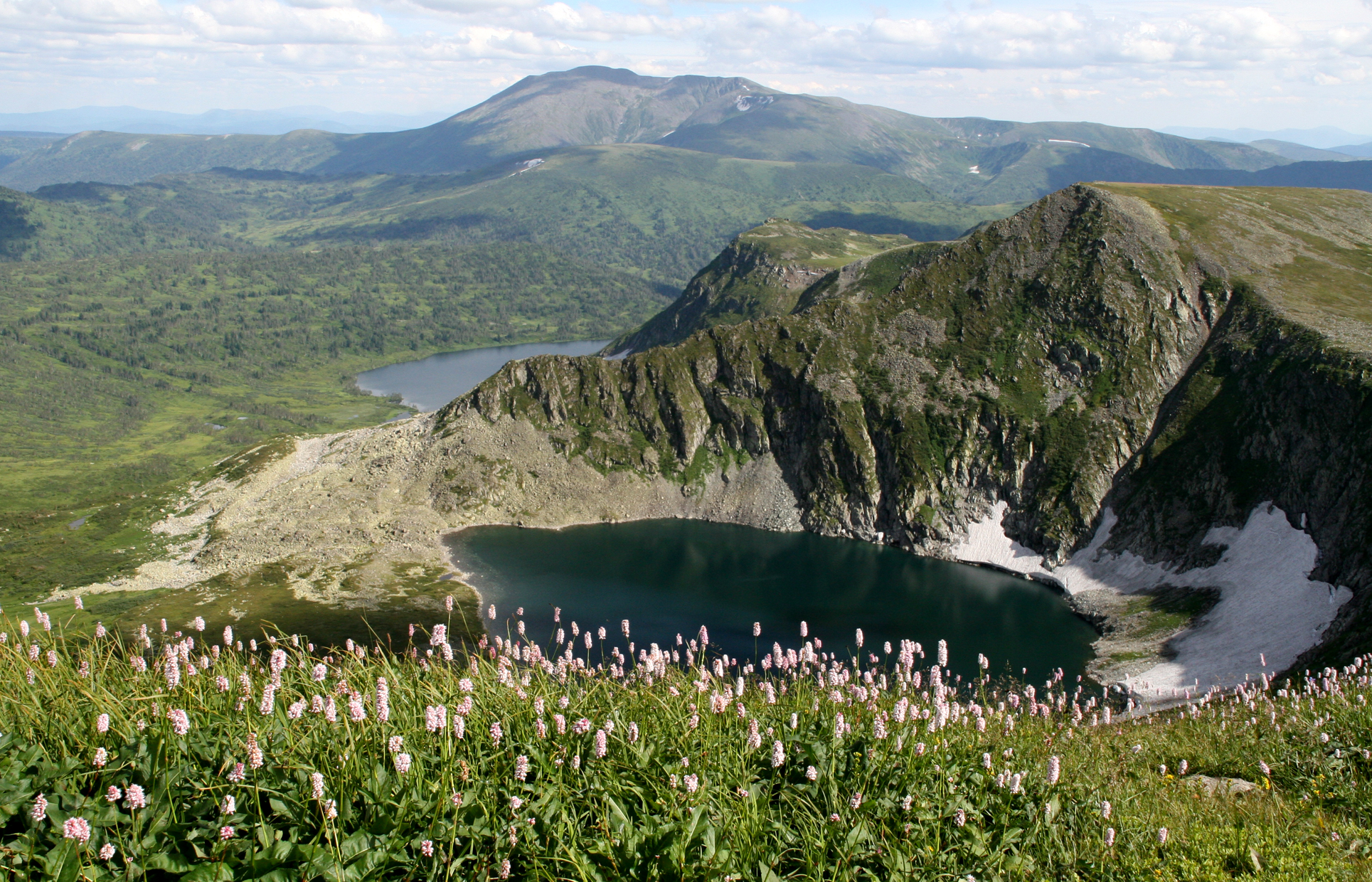
Bely Golets, Kuznetsk Alatau, Russia.

Golets (Russian: голец), plural Goltsy (Russian: Гольцы), is a type of bald mountain summit of certain areas of Siberia. The term is part of the geographical name of several peaks in the region.

== Description ==
Golets protrude above the treeline and are usually round or blunt. They are barren, rocky or stony, and only rarely lichens or stunted small scrubs such as Siberian pine, can grow on them. Bare rock slopes, kurums and cliffs are common. The term is usually found in the names of mountaintops in the South Siberian System, especially in Transbaikalia and the Sayan Mountains. The zone below the golets is normally the highest of the altitudinal vegetation zones, above the mountain tundra of the alpine belt.

This kind of mountains may consist in single high peaks connected by ridges or in continuous ridges with permanent snowcaps on their highest parts, although most "golets" are usually free of snow in the summer. Since they form part of the topmost elevation level, golets are frequently the highest points of South Siberian mountain ranges, such as in the Yablonoi Mountains, the Kropotkin Range, the Olyokma-Stanovik, the Chersky Range (Transbaikalia) and the Khentei-Daur Highlands.

== Examples ==
- Botogolsky Goltsy
- Bystrinsky Golets
- Golets Kropotkin
- Golets Sokhondo
- Golets-Torny Group
- Inyaptuk Golets
- Kitoy Goltsy
- Kontalaksky Golets
- Skalisty Golets, Kalar Range
- Skalisty Golets (Stanovoy Range)
- Tryokhgolovy Golets (Triple-head Golets)
- Tunka Goltsy

== See also ==
- Belki (geography)
- Appalachian balds
- List of mountain types
- South Siberian Mountains
