= Onon (river) =

River in Mongolia and Russia

Onon Onon gol
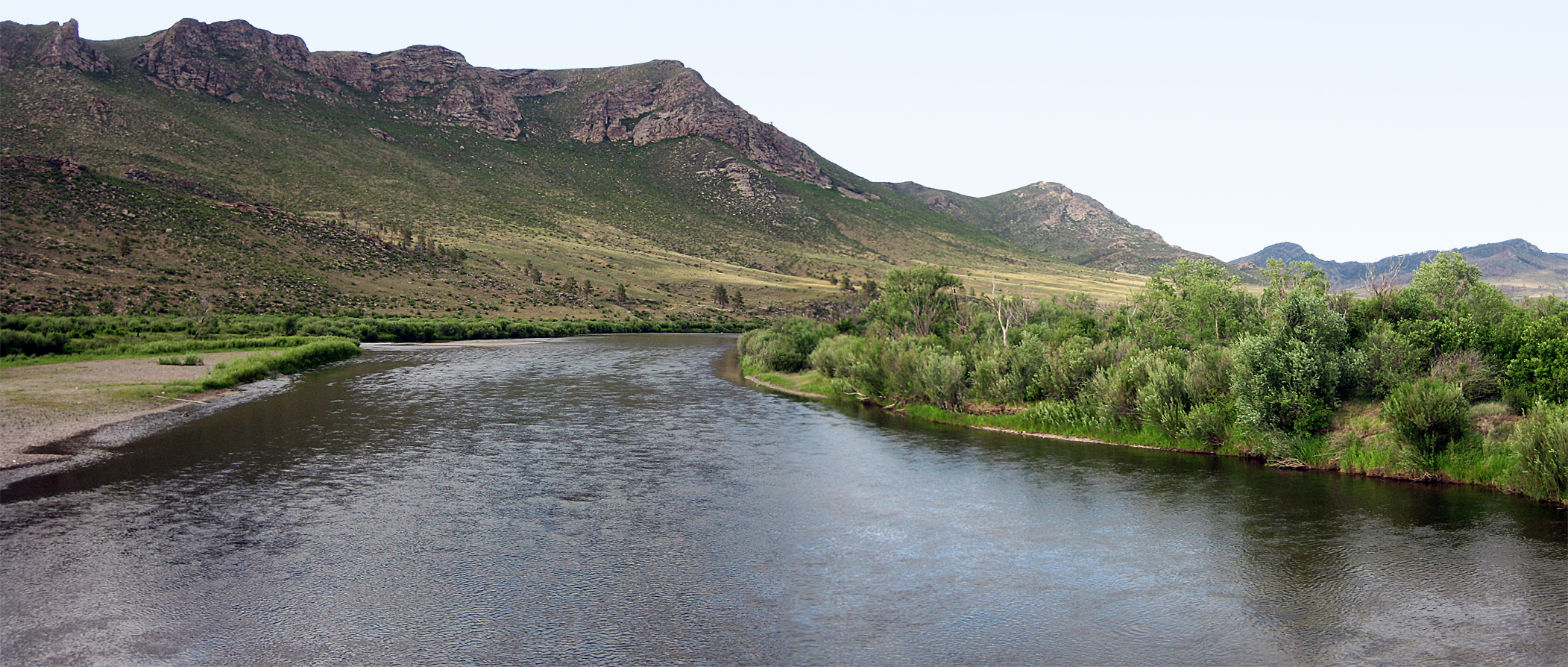
- In Khentii Province

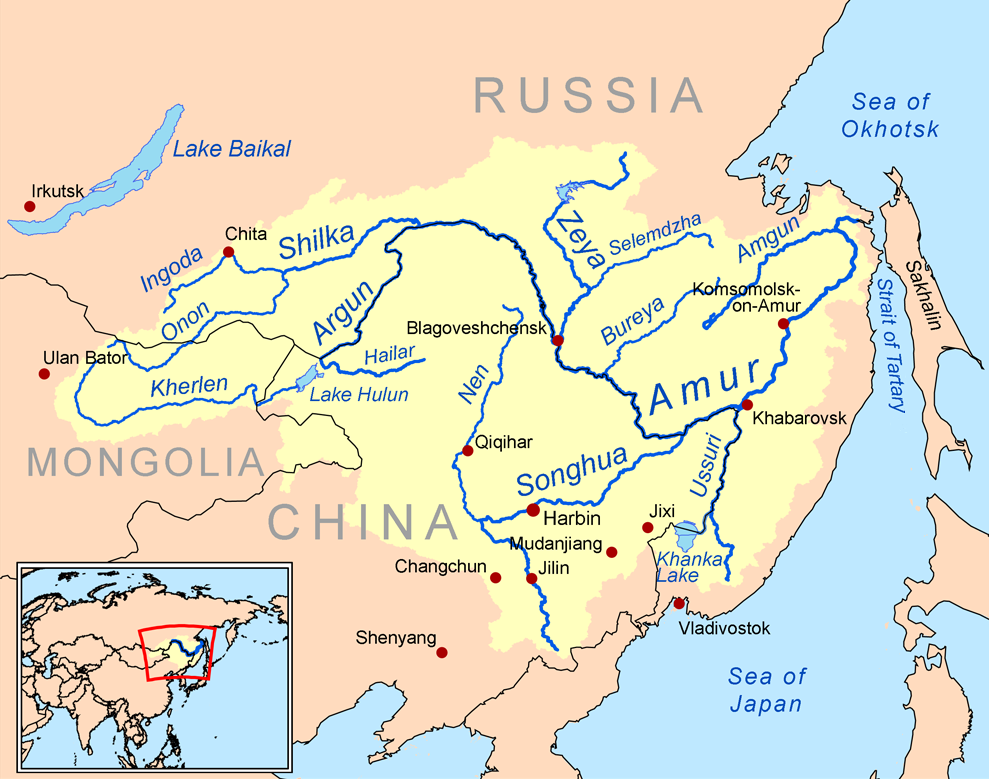
- The Onon joins the Shilka which joins the Amur
- Nickname: Queen Mother Onon
- Native name: Онон гол (Mongolian)

Location
- Country: Mongolia, Russia
- Aimag: Khentii

Physical characteristics
- Source: eastern Khentii Mountains
  - coordinates: 48.8413°N 108.7883°E
- Mouth: Shilka
  - coordinates: 51°42′21″N 115°50′40″E
- Length: 1,032 km (641 mi)
- Basin size: 96,200 km^{2} (37,100 sq mi)

Basin features
- Progression: Shilka→ Amur→ Sea of Okhotsk

The Onon (Note: Buryat and Mongolian: Онон гол, romanized: Onon gol, IPA: [ɔ́nɞɴ‿ɢɜɬ]; Russian: Онон [ɐˈnon]) is a river in Mongolia and Russia. It is 1,032 kilometres (641 mi) long, and has a drainage basin of 96,200 square kilometres (37,100 sq mi).

== Course ==
It originates at the eastern slope of the Khentii Mountains. For 298 km it flows within Mongolia, before entering the Khentei-Daur Highlands region of the Russian Far East flowing along the Stanovik Range. In its lower reaches it flows between the Mogoytuy (Могойтуйский хребет) and the Borshchovochny (Борщовочный хребет) mountain ranges. It joins with the Ingoda to form the Shilka. Its river valley forms the eastern limit of the Khentei-Daur Highlands. Its main tributaries are the Khurkhyn Gol, Borzya and Unda from the right, and the Agutsa, Kyra and Aga from the left.

The Onon—Shilka—Amur water system is one of the world's ten longest rivers, measuring 1,032 km + 560 km + 2,874 km.

== In history ==
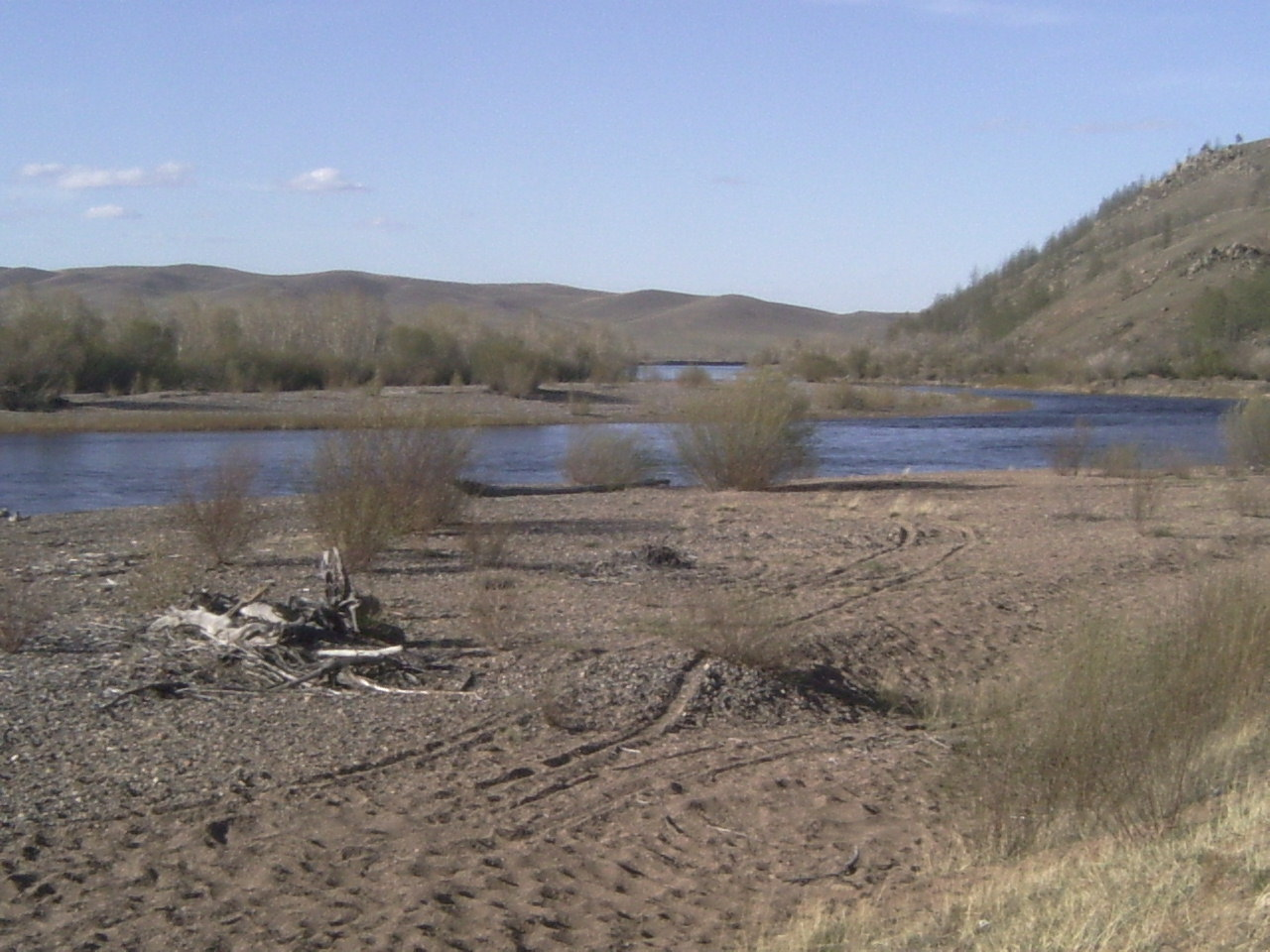
Upper Onon river, near Genghis Khan's alleged birthplace.

The upper Onon is one of the areas that are claimed to be the place where Genghis Khan was born and grew up. The seat of Genghis Khan was on the bank of river Onon.

The Secret History of the Mongols begins thus:

"There came into the world a "Borte Chono" (blue-gray wolf) whose destiny was Heaven's will. His wife was a "Gua Maral" (beautiful fallow doe). They traveled across the inland sea and when they were camped near the source of the Onon River in sight of Burkhan Khaldun, their first son was born, named Bat Tsagaan."

== Usage ==
In 2014, around 0.5 million m^{3} of water was withdrawn from the river for livestock, cropland and industrial use in Mongolia.

== See also ==
- List of rivers of Mongolia
