= Ulyoty =

Ulyoty Улёты
- Selo
- Interactive map of Ulyoty
- Location of Ulyoty Ulyoty (Zabaykalsky Krai)
- Coordinates: 51°21′N 112°28′E
- Country: Russia
- Federal subject: Zabaykalsky Krai
- Administrative district: Ulyotovsky District

Population (2010 Census)
  - Total: 6,061
  - Estimate (2010): 6,061 (0%)

Administrative status
  - Capital of: Ulyotovsky District
- Time zone: UTC+9 (MSK+6)
- Postal code: 674050
- OKTMO ID: 76646450101

Ulyoty (Russian: Улёты) is a rural locality (a selo) and the administrative center of Ulyotovsky District of Zabaykalsky Krai, Russia. Population: 6,061 (2010 census); 6,350 (2002 census); 6,693 (1989 Soviet census).

== Geography ==
The village is about 120 km southwest of the regional capital Chita. There is a regional hospital and theater.

== History ==
Ulyoty was founded in 1788 by Russians in order to collect yasak from the indigenous people to cultive crops. It became the administrative center of the district in 1926.
