= Ulyotovsky District =

Ulyotovsky District Улётовский район (Russian)
- District
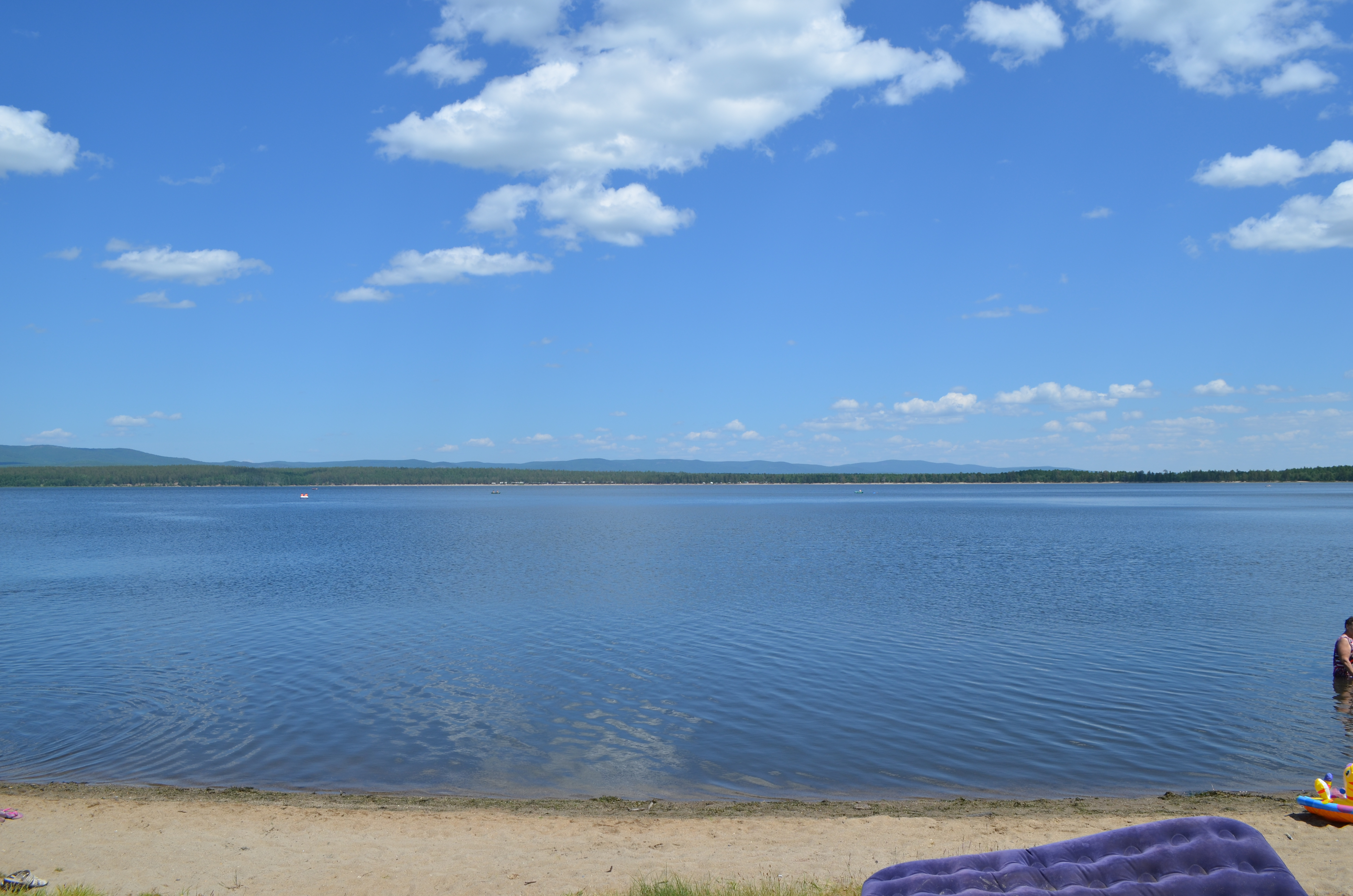
- Arey Lake

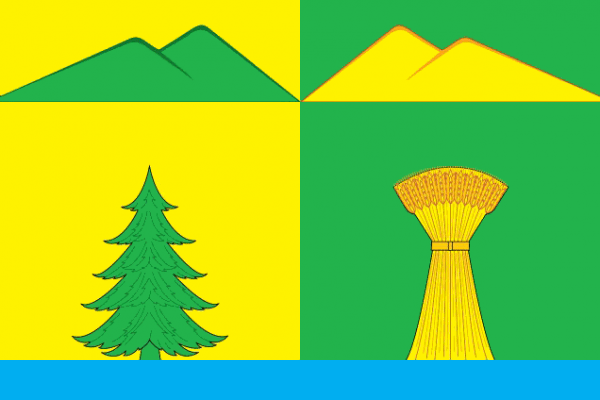
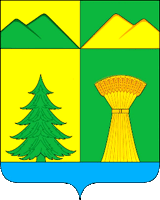
- Flag Coat of arms
- Location of Ulyotovsky District in Zabaykalsky Krai
- Coordinates: 50.831°N 111.832°E
- Country: Russia
- Federal subject: Zabaykalsky Krai
- Established: January 4, 1926
- Administrative center: Ulyoty

Area
  - Total: 16,000 km^{2} (6,200 sq mi)

Population (2010 Census)
  - Total: 18,946
  - Estimate (2018): 18,451 (−2.6%)
  - Density: 1.2/km^{2} (3.1/sq mi)
  - Urban: 15.2%
  - Rural: 84.8%

Administrative structure
  - Inhabited localities: 2 urban-type settlements, 22 rural localities

Municipal structure
  - Municipally incorporated as: Ulyotovsky Municipal District
  - Municipal divisions: 1 urban settlements, 9 rural settlements
- Time zone: UTC+9 (MSK+6)
- OKTMO ID: 76646000
- Website: http://xn--k1aob8a2a.xn--80aaaac8algcbgbck3fl0q.xn--p1ai/

Ulyotovsky District (Russian: Улётовский райо́н) is an administrative district (raion), one of the thirty-one in Zabaykalsky Krai, Russia. It is located in the southwest of the krai, and borders with Khiloksky District in the north, Duldurginsky District in the east, Kyrinsky District in the south, and with Krasnochikoysky District in the west. The area of the district is 16,000 square kilometers (6,200 sq mi). Its administrative center is the rural locality (a selo) of Ulyoty. Population: 18,946 (2010 census); 21,337 (2002 Census); 34,669 (1989 Soviet census). The population of Ulyoty accounts for 32.0% of the district's total population.

== History ==
The district was established on January 4, 1926.

== Administrative and municipal status ==
Within the framework of administrative divisions, Ulyotovsky District is one of the thirty-one in the krai. The selo of Ulyoty serves as its administrative center.

As a municipal division, the territory of the district is split between two municipal formations—Ulyotovsky Municipal District, to which one urban-type settlement and twenty-two of the administrative district's rural localities belong, and Gorny Urban Okrug, which covers the rest of the administrative district's territory, including the urban-type settlement of Gorny.
