= Krasnochikoysky District =

Krasnochikoysky District Красночикойский район (Russian)
- District
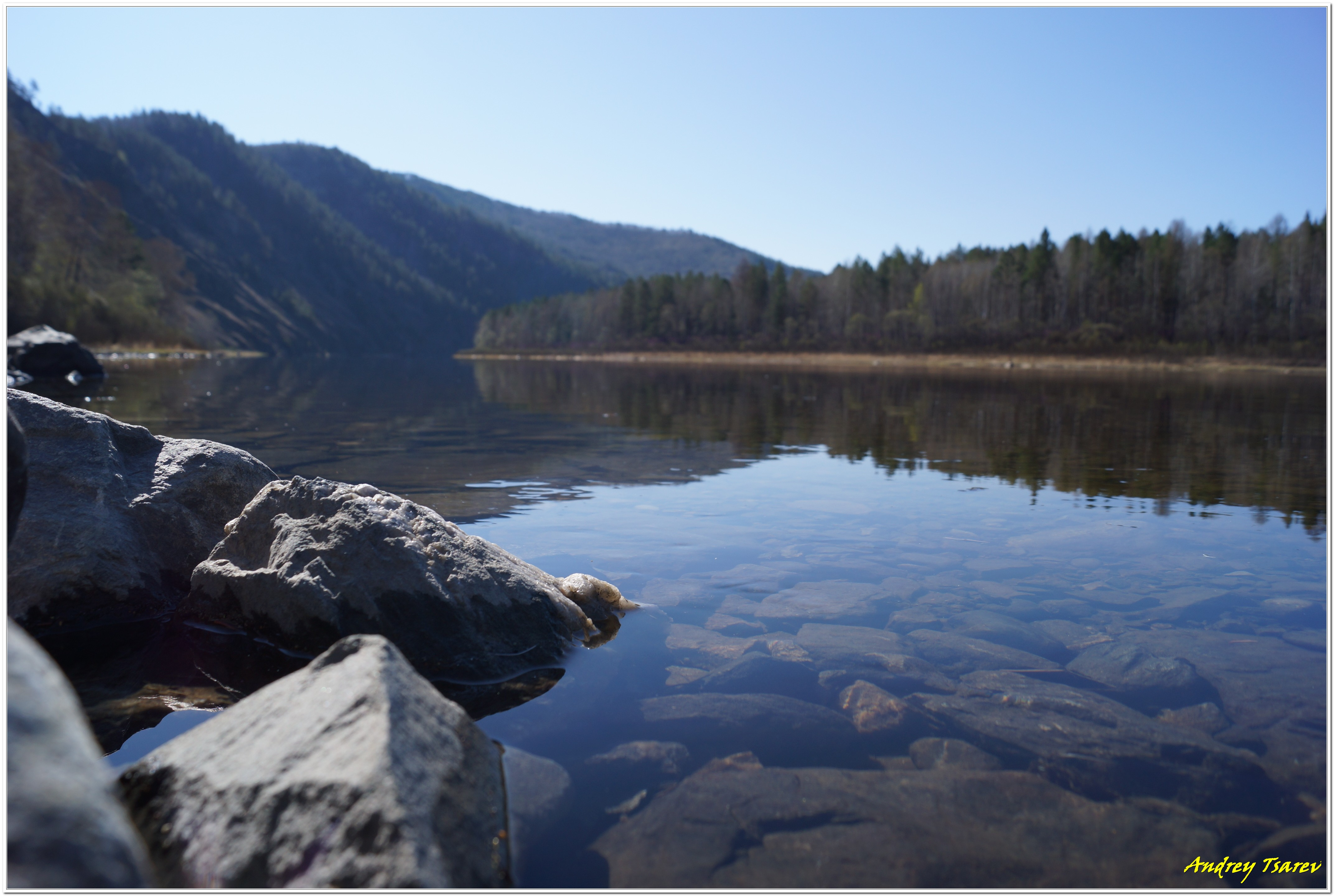
- Menza River, main tributary of the Chikoy, Krasnochikoysky District

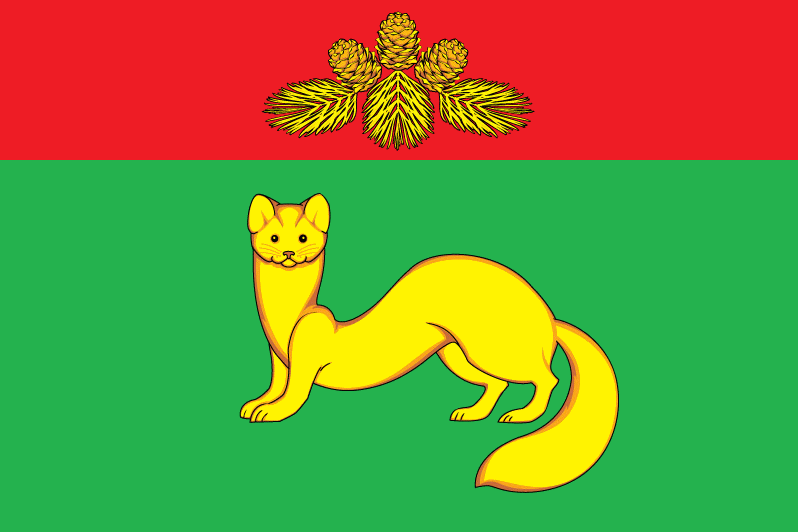
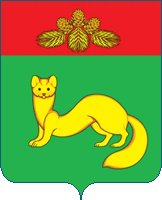
- Flag Coat of arms
- Location of Krasnochikoysky District in Zabaykalsky Krai
- Coordinates: 50.041°N 109.490°E
- Country: Russia
- Federal subject: Zabaykalsky Krai
- Established: 1933
- Administrative center: Krasny Chikoy

Area
  - Total: 28,600 km^{2} (11,000 sq mi)

Population (2010 Census)
  - Total: 19,453
  - Estimate (2018): 18,066 (−7.1%)
  - Density: 0.680/km^{2} (1.76/sq mi)
  - Urban: 0%
  - Rural: 100%

Administrative structure
  - Inhabited localities: 47 rural localities

Municipal structure
  - Municipally incorporated as: Krasnochikoysky Municipal District
  - Municipal divisions: 0 urban settlements, 15 rural settlements
- Time zone: UTC+9 (MSK+6)
- OKTMO ID: 76622000
- Website: http://xn--h1accq6b.xn--80aaaac8algcbgbck3fl0q.xn--p1ai/

Krasnochikoysky District (Russian: Красночикойский райо́н) is an administrative and municipal district (raion), one of the thirty-one in Zabaykalsky Krai, Russia. It is located in the southwest of the krai, and borders with Khiloksky District in the north, Ulyotovsky District in the east, and Kyrinsky District in the south. The area of the district is 28,600 square kilometers (11,000 sq mi). Its administrative center is the rural locality (a selo) of Krasny Chikoy. Population: 19,453 (2010 census); 21,576 (2002 Census); 23,061 (1989 Soviet census). The population of Krasny Chikoy accounts for 36.3% of the district's total population.

== Geography ==
The Khentei-Daur Highlands are located in the southern part of the district, including the Chikokon Range with Bystrinsky Golets, the highest point of the highlands.

== History ==
The district was established in 1933.
