= Krasny Chikoy =

Krasny Chikoy Кра́сный Чико́й
- Selo
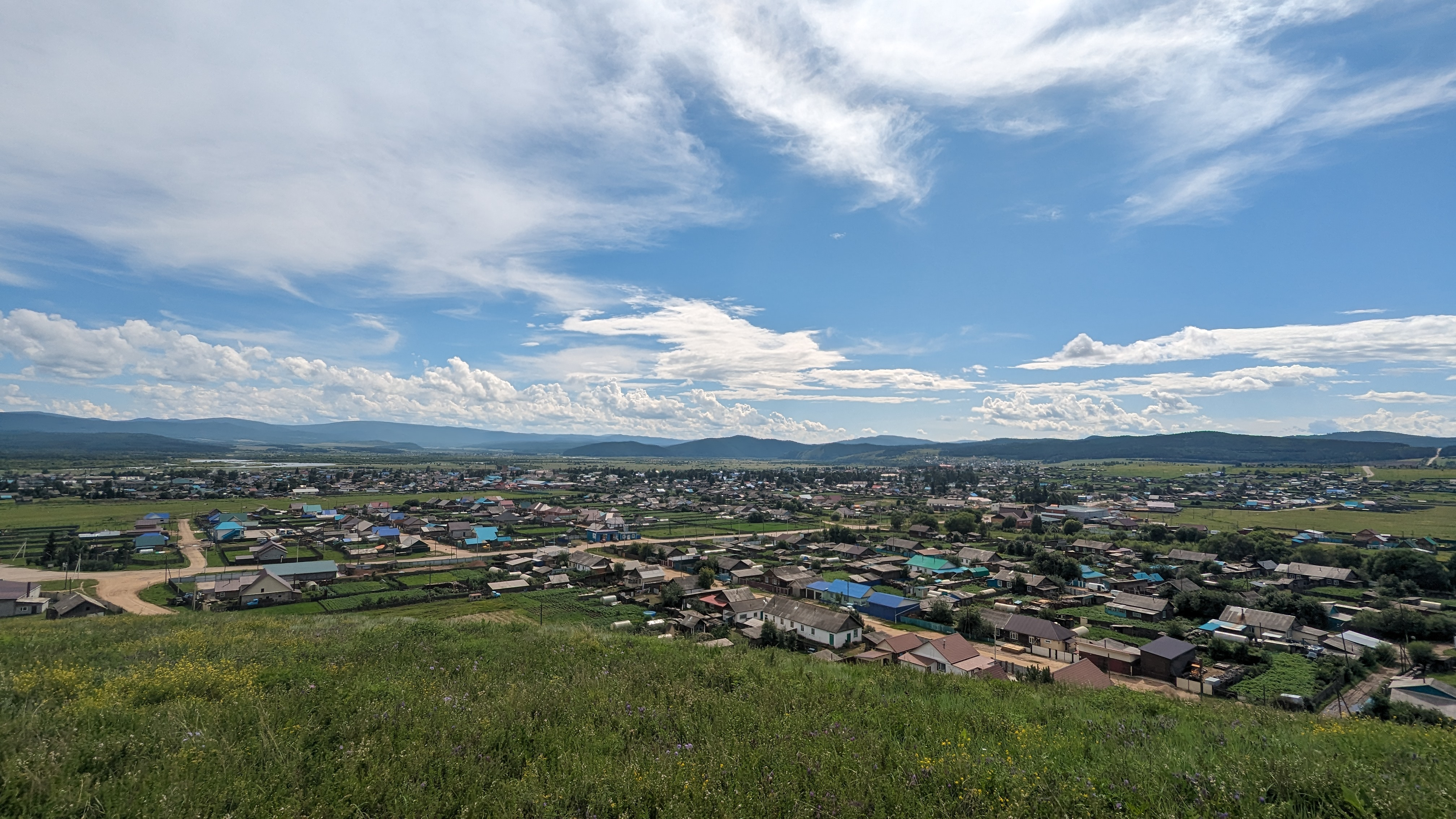

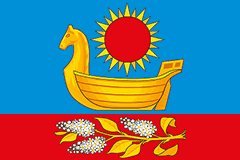
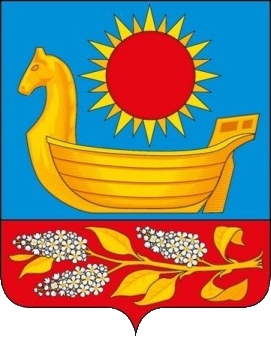
- Flag Coat of arms
- Interactive map of Krasny Chikoy
- Location of Krasny Chikoy Krasny Chikoy (Zabaykalsky Krai)
- Coordinates: 50°22′N 108°45′E
- Country: Russia
- Federal subject: Zabaykalsky Krai
- Administrative district: Krasnochikoysky District
- Founded: 1670

Population (2010 Census)
  - Total: 7,063
  - Estimate (2017): 7,107 (+0.6%)

Administrative status
  - Capital of: Krasnochikoysky District
- Time zone: UTC+9 (MSK+6)
- Postal code: 673060
- OKTMO ID: 76622445101

Krasny Chikoy (Russian: Кра́сный Чико́й) is a rural locality (a selo) and the administrative center of Krasnochikoysky District of Zabaykalsky Krai, Russia. Population: 7,063 (2010 census); 7,133 (2002 census); 6,693 (1989 Soviet census).

== Geography ==
The village is about 380 km southeast of the regional capital Chita. It is on the right bank of the Chikoy River with the Khentei-Daur Highlands to the south.

== History ==
Krasny Chikoy was founded in 1670 by explorers. The first exiled Old Believers, engaged in land tenure, harvesting pine nuts, burning lime, tar, and hunting moved to the village in 1754. In 1902, there was a parochial school, post office, telegraph, district doctor and paramedic, chamber of the magistrate, distillery and oil-refinery. In 1933, it became the administrative center of the district. An airport operated in Krasny Chikoy until the 1990s.

== Climate ==
Climate data for Krasny Chikoy (extremes 1913–present)
Month	Jan	Feb	Mar	Apr	May	Jun	Jul	Aug	Sep	Oct	Nov	Dec	Year
Record high °C (°F)	0.7 (33.3)	6.3 (43.3)	19.2 (66.6)	30.5 (86.9)	36.3 (97.3)	38.4 (101.1)	39.3 (102.7)	38.8 (101.8)	32.1 (89.8)	24.4 (75.9)	10.7 (51.3)	2.4 (36.3)	39.3 (102.7)
Mean daily maximum °C (°F)	−17.5 (0.5)	−9.8 (14.4)	0.6 (33.1)	10.8 (51.4)	18.9 (66.0)	24.6 (76.3)	26.0 (78.8)	23.0 (73.4)	16.7 (62.1)	7.1 (44.8)	−5.9 (21.4)	−15.8 (3.6)	6.6 (43.8)
Daily mean °C (°F)	−24.6 (−12.3)	−18.9 (−2.0)	−8.1 (17.4)	2.3 (36.1)	9.6 (49.3)	15.9 (60.6)	18.4 (65.1)	15.5 (59.9)	8.3 (46.9)	−0.7 (30.7)	−12.3 (9.9)	−21.6 (−6.9)	−1.4 (29.6)
Mean daily minimum °C (°F)	−30.2 (−22.4)	−26.4 (−15.5)	−15.7 (3.7)	−5.1 (22.8)	1.1 (34.0)	8.1 (46.6)	12.1 (53.8)	9.9 (49.8)	2.1 (35.8)	−6.6 (20.1)	−17.6 (0.3)	−26.5 (−15.7)	−7.9 (17.8)
Record low °C (°F)	−48.4 (−55.1)	−45.7 (−50.3)	−39.5 (−39.1)	−25.7 (−14.3)	−12.1 (10.2)	−6.8 (19.8)	−0.2 (31.6)	−3.6 (25.5)	−13.9 (7.0)	−28.2 (−18.8)	−39.3 (−38.7)	−47.1 (−52.8)	−48.4 (−55.1)
Average precipitation mm (inches)	4.9 (0.19)	2.5 (0.10)	3.8 (0.15)	8.6 (0.34)	25.2 (0.99)	51.4 (2.02)	86.9 (3.42)	90.4 (3.56)	39.4 (1.55)	11.0 (0.43)	7.2 (0.28)	8.0 (0.31)	339.3 (13.34)
Source: pogoda.ru.net
