= Stary Akatuy =

Stary Akatuy Старый Акатуй
- Selo
- Location within Zabaykalsky Krai Location within Russia
- Coordinates: 51°01′N 117°47′E
- Country: Russia
- Region: Zabaykalsky Krai
- District: Alexandrovo-Zavodsky District
- Time zone: UTC+9:00

Stary Akatuy (Russian: Старый Акатуй) is a rural locality (a selo) in Alexandrovo-Zavodsky District, Zabaykalsky Krai, Russia. Population: 172 (2021 census); 191 (2010 census); 248 (2002 census); There are 2 streets in this selo.

== Geography ==
This rural locality is located 16 km from Alexandrovsky Zavod (the district's administrative centre), 320 km from Chita (capital of Zabaykalsky Krai) and 5,631 km from Moscow. Novy Akatuy is the nearest rural locality.
