= Pochekuy =

Pochekuy Почекуй
- Selo
- Location within Zabaykalsky Krai Location within Russia
- Coordinates: 50°31′N 117°59′E
- Country: Russia
- Region: Zabaykalsky Krai
- District: Alexandrovo-Zavodsky District
- Time zone: UTC+9:00

Pochekuy (Russian: Почекуй) is a rural locality (a selo) in Alexandrovo-Zavodsky District, Zabaykalsky Krai, Russia. Population: 26 (2021 census); 39 (2010 census); 88 (2002 census); There is 1 street in this selo.

== Geography ==
This rural locality is located 44 km from Alexandrovsky Zavod (the district's administrative centre), 359 km from Chita (capital of Zabaykalsky Krai) and 5,711 km from Moscow. Mulino is the nearest rural locality.
