= Kokuy 2-y =

Kokuy 2-y Кокуй 2-й
- Selo
- Location within Zabaykalsky Krai Location within Russia
- Coordinates: 51°03′N 118°00′E
- Country: Russia
- Region: Zabaykalsky Krai
- District: Alexandrovo-Zavodsky District
- Time zone: UTC+9:00

Kokuy 2-y (Russian: Кокуй 2-й) is a rural locality (a selo) in Alexandrovo-Zavodsky District, Zabaykalsky Krai, Russia. Population: 51 (2021 census); 168 (2010 census); 220 (2002 census); There are 7 streets in this selo.

== Geography ==
This rural locality is located 15 km from Alexandrovsky Zavod (the district's administrative centre), 333 km from Chita (capital of Zabaykalsky Krai) and 5,642 km from Moscow. Verkhny Alenuy is the nearest rural locality.
