= Chindagatay =

Chindagatay Чиндагатай
- Selo
- Location within Zabaykalsky Krai Location within Russia
- Coordinates: 50°45′N 118°14′E
- Country: Russia
- Region: Zabaykalsky Krai
- District: Alexandrovo-Zavodsky District
- Time zone: UTC+9:00

Chindagatay (Russian: Чиндагатай) is a rural locality (a selo) in Alexandrovo-Zavodsky District, Zabaykalsky Krai, Russia. Population: 262 (2021 census); 409 (2010 census); 529 (2002 census); There are 11 streets in this selo.

== Geography ==
This rural locality is located 28 km from Alexandrovsky Zavod (the district's administrative centre), 362 km from Chita (capital of Zabaykalsky Krai) and 5,697 km from Moscow. Savvo-Borzya is the nearest rural locality.
