= Burukan =

Burukan Бурукан
- Selo
- Location within Zabaykalsky Krai Location within Russia
- Coordinates: 51°50′N 118°31′E
- Country: Russia
- Region: Zabaykalsky Krai
- District: Gazimuro-Zavodsky District
- Time zone: UTC+9:00

Burukan (Russian: Бурукан) is a rural locality (a selo) in Gazimuro-Zavodsky District, Zabaykalsky Krai, Russia. Population: 274 (2021 census); 291 (2010 census); 343 (2002 census); There are 8 streets in this selo.

== Geography ==
This rural locality is located 35 km from Gazimursky Zavod (the district's administrative centre), 346 km from Chita (capital of Zabaykalsky Krai) and 5,576 km from Moscow. Bura is the nearest rural locality.
