= Lomy =

Lomy (Russian: Ломы) is the name of several rural localities in Russia.

== Modern localities ==
- Lomy, Ivanovsky District, Ivanovo Oblast, a village in Ivanovsky District of Ivanovo Oblast
- Lomy, Palekhsky District, Ivanovo Oblast, a village in Palekhsky District of Ivanovo Oblast
- Lomy, Shuysky District, Ivanovo Oblast, a village in Shuysky District of Ivanovo Oblast
- Lomy, Shakhunya, Nizhny Novgorod Oblast, a village in Luzhaysky Selsoviet under the administrative jurisdiction of the town of oblast significance of Shakhunya in Nizhny Novgorod Oblast
- Lomy, Koverninsky District, Nizhny Novgorod Oblast, a village in Gavrilovsky Selsoviet of Koverninsky District in Nizhny Novgorod Oblast
- Lomy, Urensky District, Nizhny Novgorod Oblast, a village in Ustansky Selsoviet of Urensky District in Nizhny Novgorod Oblast
- Lomy, Bezhanitsky District, Pskov Oblast, a village in Bezhanitsky District of Pskov Oblast
- Lomy, Krasnogorodsky District, Pskov Oblast, a village in Krasnogorodsky District of Pskov Oblast
- Lomy, Nevelsky District, Pskov Oblast, a village in Nevelsky District of Pskov Oblast
- Lomy, Porkhovsky District, Pskov Oblast, a village in Porkhovsky District of Pskov Oblast
- Lomy, Sebezhsky District, Pskov Oblast, a village in Sebezhsky District of Pskov Oblast
- Lomy, Sychyovsky District, Smolensk Oblast, a village in Bekhteyevskoye Rural Settlement of Sychyovsky District in Smolensk Oblast
- Lomy, Tyomkinsky District, Smolensk Oblast, a village in Batyushkovskoye Rural Settlement of Tyomkinsky District in Smolensk Oblast
- Lomy, Vyazemsky District, Smolensk Oblast, a village in Khmelitskoye Rural Settlement of Vyazemsky District in Smolensk Oblast
- Lomy, Bezhetsky District, Tver Oblast, a village in Zobinskoye Rural Settlement of Bezhetsky District in Tver Oblast
- Lomy, Maksatikhinsky District, Tver Oblast, a village in Rybinskoye Rural Settlement of Maksatikhinsky District in Tver Oblast
- Lomy, Ulyanovsk Oblast, a settlement in Bolsheklyuchishchensky Rural Okrug of Ulyanovsky District in Ulyanovsk Oblast
- Lomy, Novo-Nikolsky Rural Okrug, Rostovsky District, Yaroslavl Oblast, a village in Novo-Nikolsky Rural Okrug of Rostovsky District in Yaroslavl Oblast
- Lomy, Shurskolsky Rural Okrug, Rostovsky District, Yaroslavl Oblast, a village in Shurskolsky Rural Okrug of Rostovsky District in Yaroslavl Oblast
- Lomy, Zabaykalsky Krai, a selo in Sretensky District of Zabaykalsky Krai

== Renamed localities ==
- Lomy, former name of Mokhovatkinskiye Lomy, a village in Bekhteyevskoye Rural Settlement of Sychyovsky District in Smolensk Oblast
