= Mankovo, Zabaykalsky Krai =

Mankovo Маньково
- Selo
- Location within Zabaykalsky Krai Location within Russia
- Coordinates: 50°51′N 117°42′E
- Country: Russia
- Region: Zabaykalsky Krai
- District: Alexandrovo-Zavodsky District
- Time zone: UTC+9:00

Mankovo (Russian: Маньково) is a rural locality (a selo) in Alexandrovo-Zavodsky District, Zabaykalsky Krai, Russia. Population: 184 (2021 census); 375 (2010 census); 437 (2002 census); There are 8 streets in this selo.

== Geography ==
This rural locality is located 17 km from Alexandrovsky Zavod (the district's administrative centre), 323 km from Chita (capital of Zabaykalsky Krai) and 5,649 km from Moscow. Zhuravlyovo is the nearest rural locality.
