= Trubachyovo =

Trubachyovo Трубачёво
- Selo
- Location within Zabaykalsky Krai Location within Russia
- Coordinates: 51°24′N 118°12′E
- Country: Russia
- Region: Zabaykalsky Krai
- District: Gazimuro-Zavodsky District
- Time zone: UTC+9:00

Trubachyovo (Russian: Трубачёво) is a rural locality (a selo) in Gazimuro-Zavodsky District, Zabaykalsky Krai, Russia. Population: 460 (2021 census); 510 (2010 census); 573 (2002 census); There are 7 streets in this selo.

== Geography ==
This rural locality is located 19 km from Gazimursky Zavod (the district's administrative centre), 334 km from Chita (capital of Zabaykalsky Krai) and 5,610 km from Moscow. Gazimurskie Kavykuchi is the nearest rural locality.
