= Krasnoyarovo, Zabaykalsky Krai =

Krasnoyarovo Красноярово
- Selo
- Location within Zabaykalsky Krai Location within Russia
- Coordinates: 51°15′N 118°13′E
- Country: Russia
- Region: Zabaykalsky Krai
- District: Alexandrovo-Zavodsky District
- Time zone: UTC+9:00

Krasnoyarovo (Russian: Красноярово) is a rural locality (a selo) in Alexandrovo-Zavodsky District, Zabaykalsky Krai, Russia. Population: 121 (2021 census); 153 (2010 census); There are 5 streets in this selo.

== Geography ==
This rural locality is located 42 km from Alexandrovsky Zavod (the district's administrative centre), 341 km from Chita (capital of Zabaykalsky Krai) and 5,633 km from Moscow. Kokuy 1-y is the nearest rural locality.
