= Sharakan, Zabaykalsky Krai =

Sharakan Шаракан
- Selo
- Location within Zabaykalsky Krai Location within Russia
- Coordinates: 50°50′N 118°24′E
- Country: Russia
- Region: Zabaykalsky Krai
- District: Alexandrovo-Zavodsky District
- Time zone: UTC+9:00

Sharakan (Russian: Шаракан) is a rural locality (a selo) in Alexandrovo-Zavodsky District, Zabaykalsky Krai, Russia. Population: 13 (2021 census); 58 (2010 census); 117 (2002 census); There are 5 streets in this selo.

== Geography ==
This rural locality is located 34 km from Alexandrovsky Zavod (the district's administrative centre), 369 km from Chita (capital of Zabaykalsky Krai) and 5,699 km from Moscow. Shara is the nearest rural locality.
