= Nizhnyaya Kuenga =

Nizhnyaya Kuenga Нижняя Куэнга
- Selo
- Location within Zabaykalsky Krai Location within Russia
- Coordinates: 52°05′N 117°01′E
- Country: Russia
- Region: Zabaykalsky Krai
- District: Sretensky District
- Time zone: UTC+9:00

Nizhnyaya Kuenga (Russian: Нижняя Куэнга) is a rural locality (a selo) in Sretensky District, Zabaykalsky Krai, Russia. Population: 394 (2021 census); 434 (2010 census); There are 9 streets in this selo.

== Geography ==
This rural locality is located 50 km from Sretensk (the district's administrative centre), 241 km from Chita (capital of Zabaykalsky Krai) and 5,440 km from Moscow. Dunayevo is the nearest rural locality.
