= Mankechur =

Mankechur Манкечур
- Selo
- Location within Zabaykalsky Krai Location within Russia
- Coordinates: 50°39′N 117°54′E
- Country: Russia
- Region: Zabaykalsky Krai
- District: Alexandrovo-Zavodsky District
- Time zone: UTC+9:00

Mankechur (Russian: Манкечур) is a rural locality (a selo) in Alexandrovo-Zavodsky District, Zabaykalsky Krai, Russia. Population: 405 (2021 census); 481 (2010 census); 559 (2002 census); There are 10 streets in this selo.

== Geography ==
This rural locality is located 30 km from Alexandrovsky Zavod (the district's administrative centre), 346 km from Chita (capital of Zabaykalsky Krai) and 5,688 km from Moscow. Butuntay is the nearest rural locality.
