= Onon-Borzya =

Onon-Borzya Онон-Борзя
- Selo
- Location within Zabaykalsky Krai Location within Russia
- Coordinates: 51°03′N 117°19′E
- Country: Russia
- Region: Zabaykalsky Krai
- District: Alexandrovo-Zavodsky District
- Time zone: UTC+9:00

Onon-Borzya (Russian: Онон-Борзя) is a rural locality (a selo) in Alexandrovo-Zavodsky District, Zabaykalsky Krai, Russia. Population: 200 (2021 census); 266 (2010 census); 342 (2002 census); There are 7 streets in this selo.

== Geography ==
This rural locality is located 46 km from Alexandrovsky Zavod (the district's administrative centre), 288 km from Chita (capital of Zabaykalsky Krai) and 5,594 km from Moscow. Klin is the nearest rural locality.
