= Klin, Russia =

Klin (Russian: Клин) is the name of several like inhabited localities in Russia.

== Bryansk Oblast ==
As of 2010, one rural locality in Bryansk Oblast bears this name:

- Klin, Bryansk Oblast, a village in Alexeyevsky Selsoviet of Kletnyansky District

== Leningrad Oblast ==
As of 2010, one rural locality in Leningrad Oblast bears this name:

- Klin, Leningrad Oblast, a village in Vyskatskoye Settlement Municipal Formation of Slantsevsky District

== Moscow Oblast ==
As of 2010, three inhabited localities in Moscow Oblast bear this name.

Urban localities

- Klin, Klinsky District, Moscow Oblast, a town in Klinsky District

Rural localities

- Klin, Naro-Fominsky District, Moscow Oblast, a village in Volchenkovskoye Rural Settlement of Naro-Fominsky District
- Klin, Odintsovsky District, Moscow Oblast, a settlement in Nikolskoye Rural Settlement of Odintsovsky District

== Nizhny Novgorod Oblast ==
As of 2010, two rural localities in Nizhny Novgorod Oblast bear this name:

- Klin, Shakhunya, Nizhny Novgorod Oblast, a village in Luzhaysky Selsoviet of the city of oblast significance of Shakhunya
- Klin, Vachsky District, Nizhny Novgorod Oblast, a selo in Filinsky Selsoviet of Vachsky District

== Novgorod Oblast ==
As of 2010, four rural localities in Novgorod Oblast bear this name:

- Klin, Borovichsky District, Novgorod Oblast, a village in Volokskoye Settlement of Borovichsky District
- Klin, Demyansky District, Novgorod Oblast, a village in Pesotskoye Settlement of Demyansky District
- Klin, Dubrovskoye Settlement, Soletsky District, Novgorod Oblast, a village in Dubrovskoye Settlement of Soletsky District
- Klin, Gorskoye Settlement, Soletsky District, Novgorod Oblast, a village in Gorskoye Settlement of Soletsky District

== Pskov Oblast ==
As of 2010, four rural localities in Pskov Oblast bear this name:

- Klin, Kunyinsky District, Pskov Oblast, a village in Kunyinsky District
- Klin, Novorzhevsky District, Pskov Oblast, a village in Novorzhevsky District
- Klin, Porkhovsky District, Pskov Oblast, a village in Porkhovsky District
- Klin, Sebezhsky District, Pskov Oblast, a village in Sebezhsky District

== Ryazan Oblast ==
As of 2010, one rural locality in Ryazan Oblast bears this name:

- Klin, Ryazan Oblast, a village in Aristovsky Rural Okrug of Klepikovsky District

== Samara Oblast ==
As of 2010, one rural locality in Samara Oblast bears this name:

- Klin, Samara Oblast, a settlement in Isaklinsky District

== Smolensk Oblast ==
As of 2010, three rural localities in Smolensk Oblast bear this name:

- Klin, Demidovsky District, Smolensk Oblast, a village in Slobodskoye Rural Settlement of Demidovsky District
- Klin, Roslavlsky District, Smolensk Oblast, a village in Saveyevskoye Rural Settlement of Roslavlsky District
- Klin, Vyazemsky District, Smolensk Oblast, a village in Isakovskoye Rural Settlement of Vyazemsky District

== Tula Oblast ==
As of 2010, one rural locality in Tula Oblast bears this name:

- Klin, Tula Oblast, a selo in Metrostroyevsky Rural Okrug of Venyovsky District

== Tver Oblast ==
As of 2010, one rural locality in Tver Oblast bears this name:

- Klin, Tver Oblast, a village in Torzhoksky District

== Ulyanovsk Oblast ==
As of 2010, three rural localities in Ulyanovsk Oblast bear this name:

- Klin, Kanadeysky Rural Okrug, Nikolayevsky District, Ulyanovsk Oblast, a settlement in Kanadeysky Rural Okrug of Nikolayevsky District
- Klin, Kanadeysky Rural Okrug, Nikolayevsky District, Ulyanovsk Oblast, a settlement in Kanadeysky Rural Okrug of Nikolayevsky District
- Klin, Tsilninsky District, Ulyanovsk Oblast, a settlement in Bolshenagatkinsky Rural Okrug of Tsilninsky District

== Voronezh Oblast ==
As of 2010, one rural locality in Voronezh Oblast bears this name:

- Klin, Voronezh Oblast, a khutor in Soldatskoye Rural Settlement of Ostrogozhsky District

== Yaroslavl Oblast ==
As of 2010, one rural locality in Yaroslavl Oblast bears this name:

- Klin, Yaroslavl Oblast, a village in Yudinsky Rural Okrug of Poshekhonsky District

== Zabaykalsky Krai ==
As of 2010, one rural locality in Zabaykalsky Krai bears this name:

- Klin, Zabaykalsky Krai, a selo in Alexandrovo-Zavodsky District
