= Bori, Zabaykalsky Krai =

Bori Бори
- Selo
- Location within Zabaykalsky Krai Location within Russia
- Coordinates: 52°28′N 118°06′E
- Country: Russia
- Region: Zabaykalsky Krai
- District: Sretensky District
- Time zone: UTC+9:00

Bori (Russian: Бори) is a rural locality (a selo) in Sretensky District, Zabaykalsky Krai, Russia. Population: 213 (2021 census); 236 (2010 census); 276 (2002 census); There are 3 streets in this selo.

== Geography ==
This rural locality is located 37 km from Sretensk (the district's administrative centre), 316 km from Chita (capital of Zabaykalsky Krai) and 5,464 km from Moscow. Kudeya is the nearest rural locality.
