= Alexander Ivanovich Ustyumenko =

Soviet scientist and mathematician (1913–1992)

- Александр Иванович Устюменко
- Born: October 29, 1913; Gorbitsa, Sretensky District, Russian Empire
- Died: April 6, 1992 (aged 78); Moscow, Russian Federation
- Burial place: Troyekurovskoye Cemetery
- Military career
- Allegiance: USSR
- Branch: (Soviet Union) GRU
- Service years: 1934-1974
- Rank: Major general
- Unit: 12th Chief Directorate
- Commands: Special Control Service (1957-1962)
- Conflicts: World War II; Cold War
- Awards: Order of the Patriotic War 1st Class (1943, 1985); Order of the Red Star (1956); Labor Red Banner (1962); Order of the Red Banner (1968)

Alexander Ivanovich Ustyumenko (October 29, 1913, Gorbitsa – April 6, 1992, Moscow) – was a Soviet scientist, Doctor of Physical and Mathematical Sciences (1980), and laureate of the Lenin Prize (1959). Military intelligence specialist, reach the rank of major general (1962).

== Biography ==
He was born in the village Gorbitsa, now in the Sretensky District, Zabaykalsky Krai.

Since November 1934 he served in the Red Army. He graduated from the training team of the 10th department of the headquarters of the OKDVA (1934–1935), the military faculty of the Moscow Institute of Communications Engineers (1937–1941), intelligence advanced training courses for command personnel (1941).

In 1935–1937 he served in the headquarters of Marshal Vasily Konstantinovich Blucher.

During the war, he was assistant to the head of the department of the General Staff's Military Intelligence Directorate (captain, major). Repeatedly went to the front to carry out important special assignments. In 1943 Ustyumenko, familiar with cryptography, developed a cipher code for OSNAZ (radio intelligence units).

In 1946–1954 he was a senior officer of the GRU General Staff of the Armed Forces, head of the department of the 2nd Main Directorate of the General Staff, head of the armament department.

From March 1954 to June 1974 he was the head of the Special Control Service (special monitoring of nuclear explosions) at the GRU General Staff, from 1957 – at the Ministry of Defense. Member of the Geneva negotiations on the limitation of nuclear weapons tests (1958–1961).

Major General (1962).

Retired since 1974.

Doctor of Physical and Mathematical Sciences (1980).

He was awarded the Order of the Red Banner (1968), the Order of the Patriotic War 1st Class (1943, 1985) and 2 degrees (1945), the Labor Red Banner (1962), the Order of the Red Star (1956) and medals. Laureate of the Lenin Prize in 1959 for his work "Physical foundations of early warning of nuclear explosions."

He died on April 6, 1992, in Moscow, and was buried in the Troyekurovskoye Cemetery.

== Memorials ==
- On May 13, 2018, in the military townlet of Stepygino in the Moscow Region, a memorial plaque and a street in honor of Major General Alexander Ustyumenko were opened were opened in Moscow Oblast.
- On May 14, 2018, a memorial plaque.

== Literature ==
Boltunov M. (2020). "Nuclear Genie Control Service" (in Russian). No. 9 (Army collection ed.). Moscow. pp. 69–73.
