= Isakly =

Isakly may refer to:

- Isakly, alternative name of Isaqlı, a village in Jabrayil Raion of Azerbaijan
- Isakly, Russia, a rural locality (a selo) in Samara Oblast, Russia
