= Ust-Narinzor =

Ust-Narinzor Усть-Наринзор
- Selo
- Location within Zabaykalsky Krai Location within Russia
- Coordinates: 52°15′N 117°21′E
- Country: Russia
- Region: Zabaykalsky Krai
- District: Sretensky District
- Time zone: UTC+9:00

Ust-Narinzor (Russian: Усть-Наринзор) is a rural locality (a selo) in Sretensky District, Zabaykalsky Krai, Russia. Population: 462 (2021 census); 544 (2010 census); 726 (2002 census); There are 7 streets in this selo.

== Geography ==
This rural locality is located 24 km from Sretensk (the district's administrative centre), 264 km from Chita (capital of Zabaykalsky Krai) and 5,440 km from Moscow. Delyun is the nearest rural locality.
