= Serednyaya =

Serednyaya Середняя
- Selo
- Location within Zabaykalsky Krai Location within Russia
- Coordinates: 51°40′N 120°05′E
- Country: Russia
- Region: Zabaykalsky Krai
- District: Nerchinsko-Zavodsky District
- Time zone: UTC+9:00

Serednyaya (Russian: Середняя) is a rural locality (a selo) in Nerchinsko-Zavodsky District, Zabaykalsky Krai, Russia. Population: 136 (2021 census); 147 (2010 census); 50 (2002 census); There are 2 streets in this selo.

== Geography ==
This rural locality is located 53 km from Nerchinsky Zavod (the district's administrative centre), 456 km from Chita (capital of Zabaykalsky Krai) and 5,704 km from Moscow. Argunsk is the nearest rural locality.
