= Zolotonosha, Zabaykalsky Krai =

Zolotonosha Золотоноша
- Selo
- Location within Zabaykalsky Krai Location within Russia
- Coordinates: 51°17′N 119°11′E
- Country: Russia
- Region: Zabaykalsky Krai
- District: Nerchinsko-Zavodsky District
- Time zone: UTC+9:00

Zolotonosha (Russian: Золотоноша) is a rural locality (a selo) in Nerchinsko-Zavodsky District, Zabaykalsky Krai, Russia. Population: 124 (2021 census); 136 (2010 census); 138 (2002 census); There are 2 streets in this selo.

== Geography ==
This rural locality is located 29 km from Nerchinsky Zavod (the district's administrative centre), 405 km from Chita (capital of Zabaykalsky Krai) and 5,695 km from Moscow. Bayka is the nearest rural locality.
