= Morgul, Zabaykalsky Krai =

Selo in Zabaykalsky Krai, Russia

Morgul Моргул
- Selo
- Location within Zabaykalsky Krai Location within Russia
- Coordinates: 52°15′N 117°42′E
- Country: Russia
- Region: Zabaykalsky Krai
- District: Sretensky District
- Time zone: UTC+9:00

Morgul (Russian: Моргул) is a rural locality (a selo) in Sretensky District, Zabaykalsky Krai, Russia. Population: 44 (2010 census); 66 (2002 census); There is 1 street in this selo.

== Geography ==
This rural locality is located 2 km from Sretensk (the district's administrative centre), 288 km from Chita (capital of Zabaykalsky Krai) and 5,465 km from Moscow. Sretensk is the nearest rural locality.
