= Bokhto =

Bokhto Бохто
- Selo
- Location within Zabaykalsky Krai Location within Russia
- Coordinates: 51°03′N 117°58′E
- Country: Russia
- Region: Zabaykalsky Krai
- District: Alexandrovo-Zavodsky District
- Time zone: UTC+9:00

Bokhto (Russian: Бохто) is a rural locality (a selo) in Alexandrovo-Zavodsky District, Zabaykalsky Krai, Russia. Population: 319 (2021 census); 395 (2010 census); There are 10 streets in this selo.

== Geography ==
This rural locality is located 23 km from Alexandrovsky Zavod (the district's administrative centre), 344 km from Chita (capital of Zabaykalsky Krai) and 5,653 km from Moscow. Kuznetsovo is the nearest rural locality.
