= Chikichey =

Chikichey Чикичей
- Selo
- Location within Zabaykalsky Krai Location within Russia
- Coordinates: 52°22′N 117°29′E
- Country: Russia
- Region: Zabaykalsky Krai
- District: Sretensky District
- Time zone: UTC+9:00

Chikichey (Russian: Чикичей) is a rural locality (a selo) in Sretensky District, Zabaykalsky Krai, Russia. Population: 213 (2021 census); 307 (2010 census); 482 (2002 census); There are 9 streets in this selo.

== Geography ==
This rural locality is located 20 km from Sretensk (the district's administrative centre), 274 km from Chita (capital of Zabaykalsky Krai) and 5,436 km from Moscow. Mygzha is the nearest rural locality.
