= Shemetovo =

Shemetovo Шеметово
- Selo
- Location within Zabaykalsky Krai Location within Russia
- Coordinates: 51°59′N 116°56′E
- Country: Russia
- Region: Zabaykalsky Krai
- District: Sretensky District
- Time zone: UTC+9:00

Shemetovo (Russian: Шеметово) is a rural locality (a selo) in Sretensky District, Zabaykalsky Krai, Russia. Population: 35 (2021 census); 42 (2010 census); There are 2 streets in this selo.

== Geography ==
This rural locality is located 59 km from Sretensk (the district's administrative centre), 236 km from Chita (capital of Zabaykalsky Krai) and 5,447 km from Moscow. Borshchovka is the nearest rural locality.
