= Chalbuchi-Kilga =

Chalbuchi-Kilga Чалбучи-Килга
- Selo
- Location within Zabaykalsky Krai Location within Russia
- Coordinates: 51°08′N 119°42′E
- Country: Russia
- Region: Zabaykalsky Krai
- District: Nerchinsko-Zavodsky District
- Time zone: UTC+9:00

Chalbuchi-Kilga (Russian: Чалбучи-Килга) is a rural locality (a selo) in Nerchinsko-Zavodsky District, Zabaykalsky Krai, Russia. Population: 239 (2010 census); 261 (2002 census); There are 2 streets in this selo.

== Geography ==
This rural locality is located 20 km from Nerchinsky Zavod (the district's administrative centre), 445 km from Chita (capital of Zabaykalsky Krai) and 5,750 km from Moscow. Bulduruy 2-y is the nearest rural locality.
