= Batakan =

Batakan Батакан
- Selo
- Location within Zabaykalsky Krai Location within Russia
- Coordinates: 52°04′N 118°51′E
- Country: Russia
- Region: Zabaykalsky Krai
- District: Gazimuro-Zavodsky District
- Time zone: UTC+9:00

Batakan (Russian: Батакан) is a rural locality (a selo) in Gazimuro-Zavodsky District, Zabaykalsky Krai, Russia. Population: 438 (2021 census); 533 (2010 census); 594 (2002 census); There are 16 streets in this selo.

== Geography ==
This rural locality is located 69 km from Gazimursky Zavod (the district's administrative centre), 367 km from Chita (capital of Zabaykalsky Krai) and 5,568 km from Moscow. Zakamennaya is the nearest rural locality.
