= Gorbunovka =

Gorbunovka Горбуновка
- Selo
- Location within Zabaykalsky Krai Location within Russia
- Coordinates: 51°13′N 119°45′E
- Country: Russia
- Region: Zabaykalsky Krai
- District: Nerchinsko-Zavodsky District
- Time zone: UTC+9:00

Gorbunovka (Russian: Горбуновка) is a rural locality (a selo) in Nerchinsko-Zavodsky District, Zabaykalsky Krai, Russia. Population: 183 (2021 census); 297 (2010 census); 314 (2002 census); There are 2 streets in this selo.

== Geography ==
This rural locality is located 14 km from Nerchinsky Zavod (the district's administrative centre), 445 km from Chita (capital of Zabaykalsky Krai) and 5,742 km from Moscow. Chalbuchi-Kilga is the nearest rural locality.
