= Budyumkan =

Budyumkan Будюмкан
- Selo
- Location within Zabaykalsky Krai Location within Russia
- Coordinates: 52°38′N 119°50′E
- Country: Russia
- Region: Zabaykalsky Krai
- District: Gazimuro-Zavodsky District
- Time zone: UTC+9:00

Budyumkan (Russian: Будюмкан) is a rural locality (a selo) in Gazimuro-Zavodsky District, Zabaykalsky Krai, Russia. Population: 159 (2010 census); 182 (2002 census); There are 4 streets in this selo.

== Geography ==
This rural locality is located 158 km from Gazimursky Zavod (the district's administrative centre), 433 km from Chita (capital of Zabaykalsky Krai) and 5,559 km from Moscow. Uryupino is the nearest rural locality.
