= Firsovo, Zabaykalsky Krai =

Firsovo Фирсово
- Selo
- Location within Zabaykalsky Krai Location within Russia
- Coordinates: 52°28′N 118°07′E
- Country: Russia
- Region: Zabaykalsky Krai
- District: Sretensky District
- Time zone: UTC+9:00

Firsovo (Russian: Фирсово) is a rural locality (a selo) in Sretensky District, Zabaykalsky Krai, Russia. Population: 349 (2021 census); 475 (2010 census); 558 (2002 census); There are 3 streets in this selo.

== Geography ==
This rural locality is located 30 km from Sretensk (the district's administrative centre), 317 km from Chita (capital of Zabaykalsky Krai) and 5,487 km from Moscow. Yeralga is the nearest rural locality.
