= Lugovskoye, Zabaykalsky Krai =

Lugovskoye Луговское
- Selo
- Location within Zabaykalsky Krai Location within Russia
- Coordinates: 52°03′N 118°48′E
- Country: Russia
- Region: Zabaykalsky Krai
- District: Gazimuro-Zavodsky District
- Time zone: UTC+9:00

Lugovskoye (Russian: Луговское) is a rural locality (a selo) in Gazimuro-Zavodsky District, Zabaykalsky Krai, Russia. Population: 205 (2021 census); 211 (2010 census); 225 (2002 census); There are 2 streets in this selo.

== Geography ==
This rural locality is located 65 km from Gazimursky Zavod (the district's administrative centre), 364 km from Chita (capital of Zabaykalsky Krai) and 5,567 km from Moscow. Batakan is the nearest rural locality.
