= Ust-Chyornaya, Zabaykalsky Krai =

Ust-Chyornaya Усть-Чёрная
- Selo
- Location within Zabaykalsky Krai Location within Russia
- Coordinates: 52°55′N 119°03′E
- Country: Russia
- Region: Zabaykalsky Krai
- District: Sretensky District
- Time zone: UTC+9:00

Ust-Chyornaya (Russian: Усть-Чёрная) is a rural locality (a selo) in Sretensky District, Zabaykalsky Krai, Russia. Population: 16 (2021 census); 33 (2010 census); There is 1 street in this selo.

== Geography ==
This rural locality is located 117 km from Sretensk (the district's administrative centre), 385 km from Chita (capital of Zabaykalsky Krai) and 5,469 km from Moscow. Nizhniye Kularki is the nearest rural locality.
