= Yeralga =

Yeralga Ералга
- Selo
- Location within Zabaykalsky Krai Location within Russia
- Coordinates: 52°00′N 117°00′E
- Country: Russia
- Region: Zabaykalsky Krai
- District: Sretensky District
- Time zone: UTC+9:00

Yeralga (Russian: Ералга) is a rural locality (a selo) in Sretensky District, Zabaykalsky Krai, Russia. Population: 10 (2021 census); 35 (2010 census); 64 (2002 census); There are 2 streets in this selo.

== Geography ==
This rural locality is located 25 km from Sretensk (the district's administrative centre), 312 km from Chita (capital of Zabaykalsky Krai) and 5,483 km from Moscow. Firsovo is the nearest rural locality.
