= Starolonchakovo =

Starolonchakovo Старолончаково
- Selo
- Location within Zabaykalsky Krai Location within Russia
- Coordinates: 52°36′N 118°43′E
- Country: Russia
- Region: Zabaykalsky Krai
- District: Sretensky District
- Time zone: UTC+9:00

Starolonchakovo (Russian: Старолончаково) is a rural locality (a selo) in Sretensky District, Zabaykalsky Krai, Russia. Population: 128 (2021 census); 186 (2010 census); There are 4 streets in this selo.

== Geography ==
This rural locality is located 79 km from Sretensk (the district's administrative centre), 359 km from Chita (capital of Zabaykalsky Krai) and 5,488 km from Moscow. Shilkinsky Zavod is the nearest rural locality.
