= Bazanovo =

Bazanovo (Russian: Базаново) is the name of several rural localities in Russia:

- Bazanovo, Perm Krai, a village in Sivinsky District of Perm Krai
- Bazanovo, Zabaykalsky Krai, a selo in Alexandrovo-Zavodsky District of Zabaykalsky Krai
