= Bulduruy 2-y =

Bulduruy 2-y Булдуруй 2-й
- Selo
- Location within Zabaykalsky Krai Location within Russia
- Coordinates: 51°04′N 119°41′E
- Country: Russia
- Region: Zabaykalsky Krai
- District: Nerchinsko-Zavodsky District
- Time zone: UTC+9:00

Bulduruy 2-y (Russian: Булдуруй 2-й) is a rural locality (a selo) in Nerchinsko-Zavodsky District, Zabaykalsky Krai, Russia. Population: 139 (2010 census); 174 (2002 census); There are 2 streets in this selo.

== Geography ==
This rural locality is located 27 km from Nerchinsky Zavod (the district's administrative centre), 446 km from Chita (capital of Zabaykalsky Krai) and 5,758 km from Moscow. Bulduruy 1-y is the nearest rural locality.
