= Adom, Zabaykalsky Krai =

Adom Адом
- Selo
- Location within Zabaykalsky Krai Location within Russia
- Coordinates: 52°26′N 117°30′E
- Country: Russia
- Region: Zabaykalsky Krai
- District: Sretensky District
- Time zone: UTC+9:00

Adom (Russian: Адом) is a rural locality (a selo) in Sretensky District, Zabaykalsky Krai, Russia. Population: 53 (2021 census); 78 (2010 census); There are 3 streets in this selo.

== Geography ==
This rural locality is located 25 km from Sretensk (the district's administrative centre), 276 km from Chita (capital of Zabaykalsky Krai) and 5,428 km from Moscow. Chikichey is the nearest rural locality.
