= Ust-Nachin =

Ust-Nachin Усть-Начин
- Selo
- Location within Zabaykalsky Krai Location within Russia
- Coordinates: 52°00′N 117°00′E
- Country: Russia
- Region: Zabaykalsky Krai
- District: Sretensky District
- Time zone: UTC+9:00

Ust-Nachin (Russian: Усть-Начин) is a rural locality (a selo) in Sretensky District, Zabaykalsky Krai, Russia. Population: 55 (2021 census); 118 (2010 census); There are 2 streets in this selo.

== Geography ==
This rural locality is located 105 km from Sretensk (the district's administrative centre), 392 km from Chita (capital of Zabaykalsky Krai) and 5,555 km from Moscow. Kurleya is the nearest rural locality.
