= Luzhanki =

Luzhanki Лужанки
- Selo
- Location within Zabaykalsky Krai Location within Russia
- Coordinates: 52°45′N 118°53′E
- Country: Russia
- Region: Zabaykalsky Krai
- District: Sretensky District
- Time zone: UTC+9:00

Luzhanki (Russian: Лужанки) is a rural locality (a selo) in Sretensky District, Zabaykalsky Krai, Russia. Population: 30 (2021 census); 38 (2010 census); 44 (2002 census); There are 2 streets in this selo.

== Geography ==
This rural locality is located 98 km from Sretensk (the district's administrative centre), 372 km from Chita (capital of Zabaykalsky Krai) and 5,480 km from Moscow. Tselik is the nearest rural locality.
