= Yavlenka, Zabaykalsky Krai =

Yavlenka Явленка
- Selo
- Location within Zabaykalsky Krai Location within Russia
- Coordinates: 51°02′N 119°04′E
- Country: Russia
- Region: Zabaykalsky Krai
- District: Nerchinsko-Zavodsky District
- Time zone: UTC+9:00

Yavlenka (Russian: Явленка) is a rural locality (a selo) in Nerchinsko-Zavodsky District, Zabaykalsky Krai, Russia. Population: 415 (2021 census); 698 (2010 census); 787 (2002 census); There are 11 streets in this selo.

== Geography ==
This rural locality is located 48 km from Nerchinsky Zavod (the district's administrative centre), 406 km from Chita (capital of Zabaykalsky Krai) and 5,720 km from Moscow. Chuprovo is the nearest rural locality.
