= Bolshoy Zerentuy =

Bolshoy Zerentuy Большой Зерентуй
- Selo
- Location within Zabaykalsky Krai Location within Russia
- Coordinates: 51°21′N 119°13′E
- Country: Russia
- Region: Zabaykalsky Krai
- District: Nerchinsko-Zavodsky District
- Time zone: UTC+9:00

Bolshoy Zerentuy (Russian: Большой Зерентуй) is a rural locality (a selo) in Nerchinsko-Zavodsky District, Zabaykalsky Krai, Russia. Population: 630 (2021 census); 774 (2010 census); 997 (2002 census); There are 18 streets in this selo.

== Geography ==
This rural locality is located 28 km from Nerchinsky Zavod (the district's administrative centre), 404 km from Chita (capital of Zabaykalsky Krai) and 5,686 km from Moscow. Poperechy Zerentuy is the nearest rural locality.
