= Shirokaya, Gazimuro-Zavodsky District, Zabaykalsky Krai =

Shirokaya Широкая
- Selo
- Location within Zabaykalsky Krai Location within Russia
- Coordinates: 51°35′N 118°41′E
- Country: Russia
- Region: Zabaykalsky Krai
- District: Gazimuro-Zavodsky District
- Time zone: UTC+9:00

Shirokaya (Russian: Широкая) is a rural locality (a selo) in Gazimuro-Zavodsky District, Zabaykalsky Krai, Russia. Population: 329 (2021 census); 443 (2010 census); 335 (2002 census); There are 11 streets in this selo.

== Geography ==
This rural locality is located 25 km from Gazimursky Zavod (the district's administrative centre), 362 km from Chita (capital of Zabaykalsky Krai) and 5,619 km from Moscow. Solonechny is the nearest rural locality.
