= Zakamennaya =

Zakamennaya Закаменная
- Selo
- Location within Zabaykalsky Krai Location within Russia
- Coordinates: 52°04′N 118°55′E
- Country: Russia
- Region: Zabaykalsky Krai
- District: Gazimuro-Zavodsky District
- Time zone: UTC+9:00

Zakamennaya (Russian: Закаменная) is a rural locality (a selo) in Gazimuro-Zavodsky District, Zabaykalsky Krai, Russia. Population: 77 (2010 census); 115 (2002 census); There are 3 streets in this selo.

== Geography ==
This rural locality is located 71 km from Gazimursky Zavod (the district's administrative centre), 370 km from Chita (capital of Zabaykalsky Krai) and 5,571 km from Moscow. Batakan is the nearest rural locality.
