= Chashino-Ildikan =

Chashino-Ildikan Чашино-Ильдикан
- Selo
- Location within Zabaykalsky Krai Location within Russia
- Coordinates: 51°04′N 119°15′E
- Country: Russia
- Region: Zabaykalsky Krai
- District: Nerchinsko-Zavodsky District
- Time zone: UTC+9:00

Chashino-Ildikan (Russian: Чашино-Ильдикан) is a rural locality (a selo) in Nerchinsko-Zavodsky District, Zabaykalsky Krai, Russia. Population: 229 (2021 census); 315 (2010 census); 365 (2002 census); There are 7 streets in this selo.

== Geography ==
This rural locality is located 37 km from Nerchinsky Zavod (the district's administrative centre), 416 km from Chita (capital of Zabaykalsky Krai) and 5,728 km from Moscow. Mikhaylovsky Uchastok is the nearest rural locality.
