= Nizhniye Kularki =

Selo in Zabaykalsky Krai, Russia

Nizhniye Kularki Нижние Куларки
- Selo
- Location within Zabaykalsky Krai Location within Russia
- Coordinates: 52°51′N 118°57′E
- Country: Russia
- Region: Zabaykalsky Krai
- District: Sretensky District
- Time zone: UTC+9:00

Nizhniye Kularki (Russian: Нижние Куларки) is a rural locality (a selo) in Sretensky District, Zabaykalsky Krai, Russia. Population: 131 (2021 census); 175 (2010 census); There are 4 streets in this selo.

== Geography ==
This rural locality is located 108 km from Sretensk (the district's administrative centre), 377 km from Chita (capital of Zabaykalsky Krai) and 5,469 km from Moscow. Verkhniye Kularki is the nearest rural locality.
