= Gorny Zerentuy =

Gorny Zerentuy Горный Зерентуй
- Selo
- Location within Zabaykalsky Krai Location within Russia
- Coordinates: 51°12′N 119°31′E
- Country: Russia
- Region: Zabaykalsky Krai
- District: Nerchinsko-Zavodsky District
- Time zone: UTC+9:00

Gorny Zerentuy (Russian: Горный Зерентуй) is a rural locality (a selo) in Nerchinsko-Zavodsky District, Zabaykalsky Krai, Russia. Population: 593 (2021 census); 1,153 (2010 census); 1,562 (2002 census); There are 16 streets in this selo.

== Geography ==
This rural locality is located 12 km from Nerchinsky Zavod (the district's administrative centre), 429 km from Chita (capital of Zabaykalsky Krai) and 5,727 km from Moscow. Blagodatsk is the nearest rural locality.
