= Kaktolga =

Kaktolga Кактолга
- Selo
- Location within Zabaykalsky Krai Location within Russia
- Coordinates: 52°46′N 119°35′E
- Country: Russia
- Region: Zabaykalsky Krai
- District: Gazimuro-Zavodsky District
- Time zone: UTC+9:00

Kaktolga (Russian: Кактолга) is a rural locality (a selo) in Gazimuro-Zavodsky District, Zabaykalsky Krai, Russia. Population: 282 (2021 census); 339 (2010 census); 405 (2002 census); There are 7 streets in this selo.

== Geography ==
This rural locality is located 161 km from Gazimursky Zavod (the district's administrative centre), 418 km from Chita (capital of Zabaykalsky Krai) and 5,524 km from Moscow. Arkiya is the nearest rural locality.
