= Zhuravlyovo =

Zhuravlyovo Журавлёво
- Selo
- Location within Zabaykalsky Krai Location within Russia
- Coordinates: 50°54′N 117°49′E
- Country: Russia
- Region: Zabaykalsky Krai
- District: Alexandrovo-Zavodsky District
- Time zone: UTC+9:00

Zhuravlyovo (Russian: Журавлёво) is a rural locality (a selo) in Alexandrovo-Zavodsky District, Zabaykalsky Krai, Russia. Population: 129 (2021 census); 153 (2010 census); 188 (2002 census); There are 10 streets in this selo.

== Geography ==
This rural locality is located 8 km from Alexandrovsky Zavod (the district's administrative centre), 329 km from Chita (capital of Zabaykalsky Krai) and 5,650 km from Moscow. Bazanovo is the nearest rural locality.
