= Chalbuchi =

Chalbuchi Чалбучи
- Selo
- Location within Zabaykalsky Krai Location within Russia
- Coordinates: 52°27′N 118°37′E
- Country: Russia
- Region: Zabaykalsky Krai
- District: Sretensky District
- Time zone: UTC+9:00

Chalbuchi (Russian: Чалбучи) is a rural locality (a selo) in Sretensky District, Zabaykalsky Krai, Russia. Population: 16 (2021 census); 33 (2010 census); There is 1 street in this selo.

== Geography ==
This rural locality is located 66 km from Sretensk (the district's administrative centre), 350 km from Chita (capital of Zabaykalsky Krai) and 5,502 km from Moscow. Bolshiye Boty is the nearest rural locality.
