= Zeren, Zabaykalsky Krai =

Zeren Зерен
- Selo
- Location within Zabaykalsky Krai Location within Russia
- Coordinates: 52°01′N 119°32′E
- Country: Russia
- Region: Zabaykalsky Krai
- District: Gazimuro-Zavodsky District
- Time zone: UTC+9:00

Zeren (Russian: Зерен) is a rural locality (a selo) in Gazimuro-Zavodsky District, Zabaykalsky Krai, Russia. Population: 226 (2021 census); 227 (2010 census); 249 (2002 census); There are 6 streets in this selo.

== Geography ==
This rural locality is located 99 km from Gazimursky Zavod (the district's administrative centre), 414 km from Chita (capital of Zabaykalsky Krai) and 5,620 km from Moscow. Khaykan is the nearest rural locality.

== History ==
Zeren was established in the 18th century by peasants assigned to the Argunsky plant and the Gazimuro silver smelter. During the Russian Civil War, a partisan hospital was set up to the west of the village. In 1921, an agricultural commune was formed, which in 1930 became the V.M. Molotov collective farm. In 1961 the Ushmunsky state farm was established here. As of 1989, the population of Zeren was 304. The village has an obelish in honour of the participants of the Battle of Bogdat.
