= Bayan, Zabaykalsky Krai =

Bayan Баян
- Selo
- Location within Zabaykalsky Krai Location within Russia
- Coordinates: 52°06′N 117°18′E
- Country: Russia
- Region: Zabaykalsky Krai
- District: Sretensky District
- Time zone: UTC+9:00

Bayan (Russian: Баян) is a rural locality (a selo) in Sretensky District, Zabaykalsky Krai, Russia. Population: 13 (2010 census); 19 (2002 census); There are 2 streets in this selo.

== Geography ==
This rural locality is located 32 km from Sretensk (the district's administrative centre), 260 km from Chita (capital of Zabaykalsky Krai) and 5,458 km from Moscow. Kokertay is the nearest rural locality.
