= Molodovsk =

Molodovsk Молодовск
- Selo
- Location within Zabaykalsky Krai Location within Russia
- Coordinates: 52°15′N 117°52′E
- Country: Russia
- Region: Zabaykalsky Krai
- District: Sretensky District
- Time zone: UTC+9:00

Molodovsk (Russian: Молодовск) is a rural locality (a selo) in Sretensky District, Zabaykalsky Krai, Russia. Population: 283 (2010 census); 355 (2002 census); There are 3 streets in this selo.

== Geography ==
This rural locality is located 11 km from Sretensk (the district's administrative centre), 299 km from Chita (capital of Zabaykalsky Krai) and 5,476 km from Moscow. Lomy is the nearest rural locality.
