= Shilkinsky Zavod =

Shilkinsky Zavod Шилкинский Завод
- Selo
- Location within Zabaykalsky Krai Location within Russia
- Coordinates: 52°34′N 118°40′E
- Country: Russia
- Region: Zabaykalsky Krai
- District: Sretensky District
- Time zone: UTC+9:00

Shilkinsky Zavod (Russian: Шилкинский Завод) is a rural locality (a selo) in Sretensky District, Zabaykalsky Krai, Russia. Population: 193 (2021 census); 242 (2010 census); 281 (2002 census); There are 5 streets in this selo.

== Geography ==
This rural locality is located 74 km from Sretensk (the district's administrative centre), 355 km from Chita (capital of Zabaykalsky Krai) and 5,489 km from Moscow. Starolonchakovo is the nearest rural locality.
