= Kaldaga =

Kaldaga Калдага
- Selo
- Location within Zabaykalsky Krai Location within Russia
- Coordinates: 51°37′N 118°21′E
- Country: Russia
- Region: Zabaykalsky Krai
- District: Gazimuro-Zavodsky District
- Time zone: UTC+9:00

Kaldaga (Russian: Калдага) is a rural locality (a selo) in Gazimuro-Zavodsky District, Zabaykalsky Krai, Russia. Population: 89 (2010 census); 100 (2002 census); There are 3 streets in this selo.

== Geography ==
This rural locality is located 10 km from Gazimursky Zavod (the district's administrative centre), 339 km from Chita (capital of Zabaykalsky Krai) and 5,592 km from Moscow. Ushmun is the nearest rural locality.
