= Nikolayevka, Zabaykalsky Krai =

Nikolayevka Николаевка
- Selo
- Location within Zabaykalsky Krai Location within Russia
- Coordinates: 51°00′N 117°39′E
- Country: Russia
- Region: Zabaykalsky Krai
- District: Alexandrovo-Zavodsky District
- Time zone: UTC+9:00

Nikolayevka (Russian: Николаевка) is a rural locality (a selo) in Alexandrovo-Zavodsky District, Zabaykalsky Krai, Russia. Population: 92 (2021 census); 141 (2010 census); 203 (2002 census); There are 6 streets in this selo.

== Geography ==
This rural locality is located 22 km from Alexandrovsky Zavod (the district's administrative centre), 312 km from Chita (capital of Zabaykalsky Krai) and 5,624 km from Moscow. Stary Akatuy is the nearest rural locality.
