= Dogyo =

Dogyo Догьё
- Selo
- Location within Zabaykalsky Krai Location within Russia
- Coordinates: 51°29′N 118°13′E
- Country: Russia
- Region: Zabaykalsky Krai
- District: Gazimuro-Zavodsky District
- Time zone: UTC+9:00

Dogyo (Russian: Догьё) is a rural locality (a selo) in Gazimuro-Zavodsky District, Zabaykalsky Krai, Russia. Population: 200 (2021 census); 200 (2010 census); 200 (2002 census); There are 3 streets in this selo.

== Geography ==
This rural locality is located 10 km from Gazimursky Zavod (the district's administrative centre), 332 km from Chita (capital of Zabaykalsky Krai) and 5,600 km from Moscow. Korabl is the nearest rural locality.
