= Kungara =

Kungara Кунгара
- Selo
- Location within Zabaykalsky Krai Location within Russia
- Coordinates: 51°48′N 118°26′E
- Country: Russia
- Region: Zabaykalsky Krai
- District: Gazimuro-Zavodsky District
- Time zone: UTC+9:00

Kungara (Russian: Кунгара) is a rural locality (a selo) in Gazimuro-Zavodsky District, Zabaykalsky Krai, Russia. Population: 55 (2021 census); 68 (2010 census); 80 (2002 census); There are 4 streets in this selo.

== Geography ==
This rural locality is located 29 km from Gazimursky Zavod (the district's administrative centre), 341 km from Chita (capital of Zabaykalsky Krai) and 5,575 km from Moscow. Kuryumdikan is the nearest rural locality.
