= Igdocha =

Igdocha Игдоча
- Selo
- Location within Zabaykalsky Krai Location within Russia
- Coordinates: 51°33′N 118°18′E
- Country: Russia
- Region: Zabaykalsky Krai
- District: Gazimuro-Zavodsky District
- Time zone: UTC+9:00

Igdocha (Russian: Игдоча) is a rural locality (a selo) in Gazimuro-Zavodsky District, Zabaykalsky Krai, Russia. Population: 217 (2021 census); 250 (2010 census); 269 (2002 census); There are 2 streets in this selo.

== Geography ==
This rural locality is located 3 km from Gazimursky Zavod (the district's administrative centre), 337 km from Chita (capital of Zabaykalsky Krai) and 5,597 km from Moscow. Gazimursky Zavod is the nearest rural locality.
