= Aliya, Sretensky District, Zabaykalsky Krai =

Aliya Алия
- Selo
- Location within Zabaykalsky Krai Location within Russia
- Coordinates: 52°18′N 117°37′E
- Country: Russia
- Region: Zabaykalsky Krai
- District: Sretensky District
- Time zone: UTC+9:00

Aliya (Russian: Алия) is a rural locality (a selo) in Sretensky District, Zabaykalsky Krai, Russia. Population: 487 (2021 census); 545 (2010 census); 658 (2002 census); There are 5 streets in this selo.

== Geography ==
This rural locality is located 10 km from Sretensk (the district's administrative centre), 282 km from Chita (capital of Zabaykalsky Krai) and 5,451 km from Moscow. Morgul is the nearest rural locality.
