= Verkhniye Kularki =

Verkhniye Kularki Верхние Куларки
- Selo
- Location within Zabaykalsky Krai Location within Russia
- Coordinates: 52°49′N 118°56′E
- Country: Russia
- Region: Zabaykalsky Krai
- District: Sretensky District
- Time zone: UTC+9:00

Verkhniye Kularki (Russian: Верхние Куларки) is a rural locality (a selo) in Sretensky District, Zabaykalsky Krai, Russia. Population: 322 (2021 census); 345 (2010 census); 413 (2002 census); There are 5 streets in this selo.

== Geography ==
This rural locality is located 106 km from Sretensk (the district's administrative centre), 377 km from Chita (capital of Zabaykalsky Krai) and 5,473 km from Moscow. Nizhniye Kularki is the nearest rural locality.
