= Bura, Gazimuro-Zavodsky District, Zabaykalsky Krai =

Bura Бура
- Selo
- Location within Zabaykalsky Krai Location within Russia
- Coordinates: 51°50′N 118°33′E
- Country: Russia
- Region: Zabaykalsky Krai
- District: Gazimuro-Zavodsky District
- Time zone: UTC+9:00

Bura (Russian: Бура) is a rural locality (a selo) in Gazimuro-Zavodsky District, Zabaykalsky Krai, Russia. Population: 64 (2010 census); 73 (2002 census); There are 3 streets in this selo.

== Geography ==
This rural locality is located 36 km from Gazimursky Zavod (the district's administrative centre), 348 km from Chita (capital of Zabaykalsky Krai) and 5,578 km from Moscow. Burukan is the nearest rural locality.
