= Savvo-Borzya =

Savvo-Borzya Савво-Борзя
- Selo
- Location within Zabaykalsky Krai Location within Russia
- Coordinates: 50°41′N 118°20′E
- Country: Russia
- Region: Zabaykalsky Krai
- District: Alexandrovo-Zavodsky District
- Time zone: UTC+9:00

Savvo-Borzya (Russian: Савво-Борзя) is a rural locality (a selo) in Alexandrovo-Zavodsky District, Zabaykalsky Krai, Russia. Population: 115 (2021 census); 212 (2010 census); 297 (2002 census); There are 6 streets in this selo.

== Geography ==
This rural locality is located 38 km from Alexandrovsky Zavod (the district's administrative centre), 372 km from Chita (capital of Zabaykalsky Krai) and 5,713 km from Moscow. Chindagatay is the nearest rural locality.
