= Butuntay =

Butuntay Бутунтай
- Selo
- Location within Zabaykalsky Krai Location within Russia
- Coordinates: 50°39′N 118°07′E
- Country: Russia
- Region: Zabaykalsky Krai
- District: Alexandrovo-Zavodsky District
- Time zone: UTC+9:00

Butuntay (Russian: Бутунтай) is a rural locality (a selo) in Alexandrovo-Zavodsky District, Zabaykalsky Krai, Russia. Population: 294 (2021 census); 368 (2010 census); There are 8 streets in this selo.

== Geography ==
This rural locality is located 32 km from Alexandrovsky Zavod (the district's administrative centre), 360 km from Chita (capital of Zabaykalsky Krai) and 5,703 km from Moscow. Mulino is the nearest rural locality.
