= Shara, Zabaykalsky Krai =

Shara Шара
- Selo
- Location within Zabaykalsky Krai Location within Russia
- Coordinates: 50°49′N 118°21′E
- Country: Russia
- Region: Zabaykalsky Krai
- District: Alexandrovo-Zavodsky District
- Time zone: UTC+9:00

Shara (Russian: Шара) is a rural locality (a selo) in Alexandrovo-Zavodsky District, Zabaykalsky Krai, Russia. Population: 7 (2021 census); 112 (2010 census); 285 (2002 census); There are 10 streets in this selo.

== Geography ==
This rural locality is located 31 km from Alexandrovsky Zavod (the district's administrative centre), 366 km from Chita (capital of Zabaykalsky Krai) and 5,696 km from Moscow. Sharakan is the nearest rural locality.
