= Gorbitsa =

Gorbitsa Горбица
- Selo
- Location within Zabaykalsky Krai Location within Russia
- Coordinates: 53°06′N 119°13′E
- Country: Russia
- Region: Zabaykalsky Krai
- District: Sretensky District
- Time zone: UTC+9:00

Gorbitsa (Russian: Горбица) is a rural locality (a selo) in Sretensky District, Zabaykalsky Krai, Russia. Population: 34 (2021 census); 60 (2010 census); 98 (2002 census); There is 1 street in this selo.

== Geography ==
This rural locality is located 138 km from Sretensk (the district's administrative centre), 400 km from Chita (capital of Zabaykalsky Krai) and 5,456 km from Moscow. Ust-Chyornaya is the nearest rural locality.
