= Kokuy 1-y =

Kokuy 1-y Кокуй 1-й
- Selo
- Location within Zabaykalsky Krai Location within Russia
- Coordinates: 51°10′N 118°20′E
- Country: Russia
- Region: Zabaykalsky Krai
- District: Alexandrovo-Zavodsky District
- Time zone: UTC+9:00

Kokuy 1-y (Russian: Кокуй 1-й) is a rural locality (a selo) in Alexandrovo-Zavodsky District, Zabaykalsky Krai, Russia. Population: 208 (2021 census); 243 (2010 census); 272 (2002 census); There are 6 streets in this selo.

== Geography ==
This rural locality is located 40 km from Alexandrovsky Zavod (the district's administrative centre), 351 km from Chita (capital of Zabaykalsky Krai) and 5,651 km from Moscow. Kulikovo is the nearest rural locality.
