= Verkhny Alenuy =

Verkhny Alenuy Верхний Аленуй
- Selo
- Location within Zabaykalsky Krai Location within Russia
- Coordinates: 51°08′N 117°58′E
- Country: Russia
- Region: Zabaykalsky Krai
- District: Alexandrovo-Zavodsky District
- Time zone: UTC+9:00

Verkhny Alenuy (Russian: Верхний Аленуй) is a rural locality (a selo) in Alexandrovo-Zavodsky District, Zabaykalsky Krai, Russia. Population: 155 (2021 census); 175 (2010 census); There are 5 streets in this selo.

== Geography ==
This rural locality is located 24 km from Alexandrovsky Zavod (the district's administrative centre), 327 km from Chita (capital of Zabaykalsky Krai) and 5,630 km from Moscow. Kokuy 2-y is the nearest rural locality.
