= Lomy, Zabaykalsky Krai =

Lomy Ломы
- Selo
- Location within Zabaykalsky Krai Location within Russia
- Coordinates: 52°17′N 118°00′E
- Country: Russia
- Region: Zabaykalsky Krai
- District: Sretensky District
- Time zone: UTC+9:00

Lomy (Russian: Ломы) is a rural locality (a selo) in Sretensky District, Zabaykalsky Krai, Russia. Population: 311 (2021 census); 360 (2010 census); 438 (2002 census); There are 4 streets in this selo.

== Geography ==
This rural locality is located 20 km from Sretensk (the district's administrative centre), 308 km from Chita (capital of Zabaykalsky Krai) and 5,481 km from Moscow. Yeralga is the nearest rural locality.
