= Dunayevo =

Dunayevo Дунаево
- Selo
- Location within Zabaykalsky Krai Location within Russia
- Coordinates: 52°04′N 117°03′E
- Country: Russia
- Region: Zabaykalsky Krai
- District: Sretensky District
- Time zone: UTC+9:00

Dunayevo (Russian: Дунаево) is a rural locality (a selo) in Sretensky District, Zabaykalsky Krai, Russia. Population: 925 (2021 census); 1,009 (2010 census); 1,150 (2002 census); There are 16 streets in this selo.

== Geography ==
This rural locality is located 49 km from Sretensk (the district's administrative centre), 243 km from Chita (capital of Zabaykalsky Krai) and 5,445 km from Moscow. Nizhnyaya Kuenga is the nearest rural locality.
