= Mulino, Russia =

Mulino (Russian: Мулино) is the name of several rural localities in Russia:

- Mulino, Kirov Oblast, a selo in Mulinsky Rural Okrug of Nagorsky District of Kirov Oblast
- Mulino, Kostroma Oblast, a village in Prigorodnoye Settlement of Nerekhtsky District of Kostroma Oblast
- Mulino (settlement), Nizhny Novgorod Oblast, a settlement in Mulinsky Selsoviet of Volodarsky District of Nizhny Novgorod Oblast
- Mulino (village), Nizhny Novgorod Oblast, a village in Mulinsky Selsoviet of Volodarsky District of Nizhny Novgorod Oblast
- Mulino, Vologda Oblast, a village in Timanovsky Selsoviet of Babushkinsky District of Vologda Oblast
- Mulino, Zabaykalsky Krai, a selo in Alexandrovo-Zavodsky District of Zabaykalsky Krai
