= Novy Akatuy =

Novy Akatuy Новый Акатуй
- Selo
- Location within Zabaykalsky Krai Location within Russia
- Coordinates: 51°03′N 117°46′E
- Country: Russia
- Region: Zabaykalsky Krai
- District: Alexandrovo-Zavodsky District
- Time zone: UTC+9:00

Novy Akatuy (Russian: Новый Акатуй) is a rural locality (a selo) in Alexandrovo-Zavodsky District, Zabaykalsky Krai, Russia. Population: 552 (2021 census); 732 (2010 census); 866 (2002 census); There are 19 streets in this selo.

== Geography ==
This rural locality is located 18 km from Alexandrovsky Zavod (the district's administrative centre), 319 km from Chita (capital of Zabaykalsky Krai) and 5,628 km from Moscow. Stary Akatuy is the nearest rural locality.
