= Gazimurskie Kavykuchi =

Gazimurskie Kavykuchi Газимурские Кавыкучи
- Selo
- Location within Zabaykalsky Krai Location within Russia
- Coordinates: 51°21′N 118°10′E
- Country: Russia
- Region: Zabaykalsky Krai
- District: Gazimuro-Zavodsky District
- Time zone: UTC+9:00

Gazimurskie Kavykuchi (Russian: Газимурские Кавыкучи) is a rural locality (a selo) in Gazimuro-Zavodsky District, Zabaykalsky Krai, Russia. Population: 101 (2021 census); 124 (2010 census); 133 (2002 census); There are 3 streets in this selo.

== Geography ==
This rural locality is located 24 km from Gazimursky Zavod (the district's administrative centre), 334 km from Chita (capital of Zabaykalsky Krai) and 5,615 km from Moscow. Trubachevo is the nearest rural locality.
