= Mulino =

Mulino may refer to:

- Daniel Mulino (b. 1969), Australian politician
- José Raúl Mulino, Panamanian president
- Mulino, Russia, several rural localities in Russia
- Mulino, Oregon, a hamlet in Oregon, United States
- Mulino State Airport, a public airport in Oregon, United States
