= Klin, Zabaykalsky Krai =

Klin Клин
- Selo
- Location within Zabaykalsky Krai Location within Russia
- Coordinates: 50°59′N 117°27′E
- Country: Russia
- Region: Zabaykalsky Krai
- District: Alexandrovo-Zavodsky District
- Time zone: UTC+9:00

Klin (Russian: Клин) is a rural locality (a selo) in Alexandrovo-Zavodsky District, Zabaykalsky Krai, Russia. Population: 107 (2021 census); 120 (2010 census); 169 (2002 census); There are 5 streets in this selo.

== Geography ==
This rural locality is located 34 km from Alexandrovsky Zavod (the district's administrative centre), 300 km from Chita (capital of Zabaykalsky Krai) and 5,613 km from Moscow. Kirillikha is the nearest rural locality.
