= Kirillikha =

Kirillikha Кириллиха
- Selo
- Location within Zabaykalsky Krai Location within Russia
- Coordinates: 50°55′N 117°29′E
- Country: Russia
- Region: Zabaykalsky Krai
- District: Alexandrovo-Zavodsky District
- Time zone: UTC+9:00

Kirillikha (Russian: Кириллиха) is a rural locality (a selo) in Alexandrovo-Zavodsky District, Zabaykalsky Krai, Russia. Population: 125 (2021 census); 167 (2010 census); 211 (2002 census); There are 3 streets in this selo.

== Geography ==
This rural locality is located 32 km from Alexandrovsky Zavod (the district's administrative centre), 305 km from Chita (capital of Zabaykalsky Krai) and 5,623 km from Moscow. Klin is the nearest rural locality.
