= Olochi =

Olochi Олочи
- Selo
- Location within Zabaykalsky Krai Location within Russia
- Coordinates: 51°21′09″N 119°53′59″E
- Country: Russia
- Region: Zabaykalsky Krai
- District: Nerchinsko-Zavodsky District
- Municipality: Olochinskoye Rural Settlement
- Time zone: UTC+3:00

Olochi (Russian: Олочи) is a rural locality (a selo) and the administrative center and only settlement of Olochinskoye Rural Settlement of Nerchinsko-Zavodsky District, Zabaykalsky Krai, in Far East Russia. It is located on the left bank of the Argun river, 22 km (14 mi) from the village of Nerchinsky Zavod. Population: 372 (2010 census); 378 (2002 census);
