= Bugdainskoe mine =

Molybdenum mine in Russia

- Location within Russia
- Location: Zabaykalsky Krai, Russia; 51°10′36″N 117°40′39″E
- Products: Molybdenum

The Bugdainskoe mine is a large molybdenum mine located in the south of Russia in Alexandrovo-Zavodsky District, Zabaykalsky Krai. Bugdainskoe represents one of the largest molybdenum reserve in Russia and in the world having estimated reserves of 813 million tonnes of ore grading 0.08% molybdenum, 0.35million oz of gold and 6.2 million oz of silver.
