= Mulino, Zabaykalsky Krai =

Mulino Мулино
- Selo
- Location within Zabaykalsky Krai Location within Russia
- Coordinates: 50°32′N 118°04′E
- Country: Russia
- Region: Zabaykalsky Krai
- District: Alexandrovo-Zavodsky District
- Time zone: UTC+9:00

Mulino (Russian: Мулино) is a rural locality (a selo) in Alexandrovo-Zavodsky District, Zabaykalsky Krai, Russia. Population: 102 (2021 census); 156 (2010 census); 259 (2002 census); There are 5 streets in this selo.

== Geography ==
This rural locality is located 43 km from Alexandrovsky Zavod (the district's administrative centre), 363 km from Chita (capital of Zabaykalsky Krai) and 5,715 km from Moscow. Pochekuy is the nearest rural locality.
