= Lomy, Ivanovsky District, Ivanovo Oblast =

Lomy Ломы
- Village
- Location within Ivanovo Oblast Location within Russia
- Coordinates: 56°52′N 40°58′E
- Country: Russia
- Region: Ivanovo Oblast
- District: Ivanovsky District
- Time zone: UTC+3:00

Lomy (Russian: Ломы) is a rural locality (a village) in Ivanovsky District, Ivanovo Oblast, Russia. Population: 80 (2010 census);

== Geography ==
This rural locality is located 12 km from Ivanovo (the district's administrative centre and capital of Ivanovo Oblast) and 239 km from Moscow. Zelyony Gorodok is the nearest rural locality.
