= Bazanovo, Zabaykalsky Krai =

Bazanovo Базаново
- Selo
- Location within Zabaykalsky Krai Location within Russia
- Coordinates: 50°57′N 117°47′E
- Country: Russia
- Region: Zabaykalsky Krai
- District: Alexandrovo-Zavodsky District
- Time zone: UTC+9:00

Bazanovo (Russian: Базаново) is a rural locality (a selo) in Alexandrovo-Zavodsky District, Zabaykalsky Krai, Russia. Population: 58 (2021 census); 82 (2010 census); 111 (2002 census); There are 3 streets in this selo.

== Geography ==
This rural locality is located 11 km from Alexandrovsky Zavod (the district's administrative centre), 324 km from Chita (capital of Zabaykalsky Krai) and 5,641 km from Moscow. Zhuravlevo is the nearest rural locality.
