= İsaqlı, Qubadli =

İsaqlı
- Location within Azerbaijan
- Coordinates: 39°25′11″N 46°52′24″E
- Country: Azerbaijan
- District: Jabrayil
- Time zone: UTC+4 (AZT)
  - Summer (DST): UTC+5 (AZT)

İsaqlı (Isagly) is a village in the Jabrayil District of Azerbaijan. It was occupied by the Armenian forces in 1993. The village was announced to be recaptured by the Army of Azerbaijan on 19 October 2020.
