= Gazimur =

Location
- Country: Russia
- Region: Zabaykalsky Krai

Physical characteristics
- Source
  - coordinates: 50°43′23″N 117°29′13″E
  - elevation: 1,100 m (3,600 ft)
- Mouth: Argun
  - coordinates: 52°56′10″N 120°20′58″E
  - elevation: 343 m (1,125 ft)
- Length: 592 km (368 mi)
- Basin size: 12,100 km^{2} (4,700 sq mi)

Basin features
- Progression: Argun→ Amur→ Sea of Okhotsk

The Gazimur (Russian: Газимур, also Gasimur or Bolshoy Gazimur) is a river of Zabaykalsky Krai, Siberia, eastern Russia, a left tributary of the Argun. With a length of 592 kilometres (368 mi) and a basin area of 12,100 square kilometres (4,700 mi^{2}), the Gazimur is one of the major East Transbaikalian rivers. It originates in the north-west ridge of Nerchinsk. It flows generally from the south-west to north-east. The banks are typically steep, overgrown with bushes. The Gazimur typically has a shallow, rocky bottom, and clear water. It freezes at the beginning of November and thaws in early May. Gazimursky Zavod is located on the bank of the river.

In the early 1720s, the basin was explored for deposits of silver.
