= Isakly, Russia =

Rural locality in Samara Oblast, Russia

Coordinates: 54°07′55″N 51°32′22″E

Isakly (Russian: Исаклы) is a rural locality (a selo) and the administrative center of Isaklinsky District, Samara Oblast, Russia. Population: 4,334 (2010 census); 4,451 (2002 census); 4,632 (1989 Soviet census).
