= Isaklinsky District =

Isaklinsky District Исаклинский район (Russian)
- District
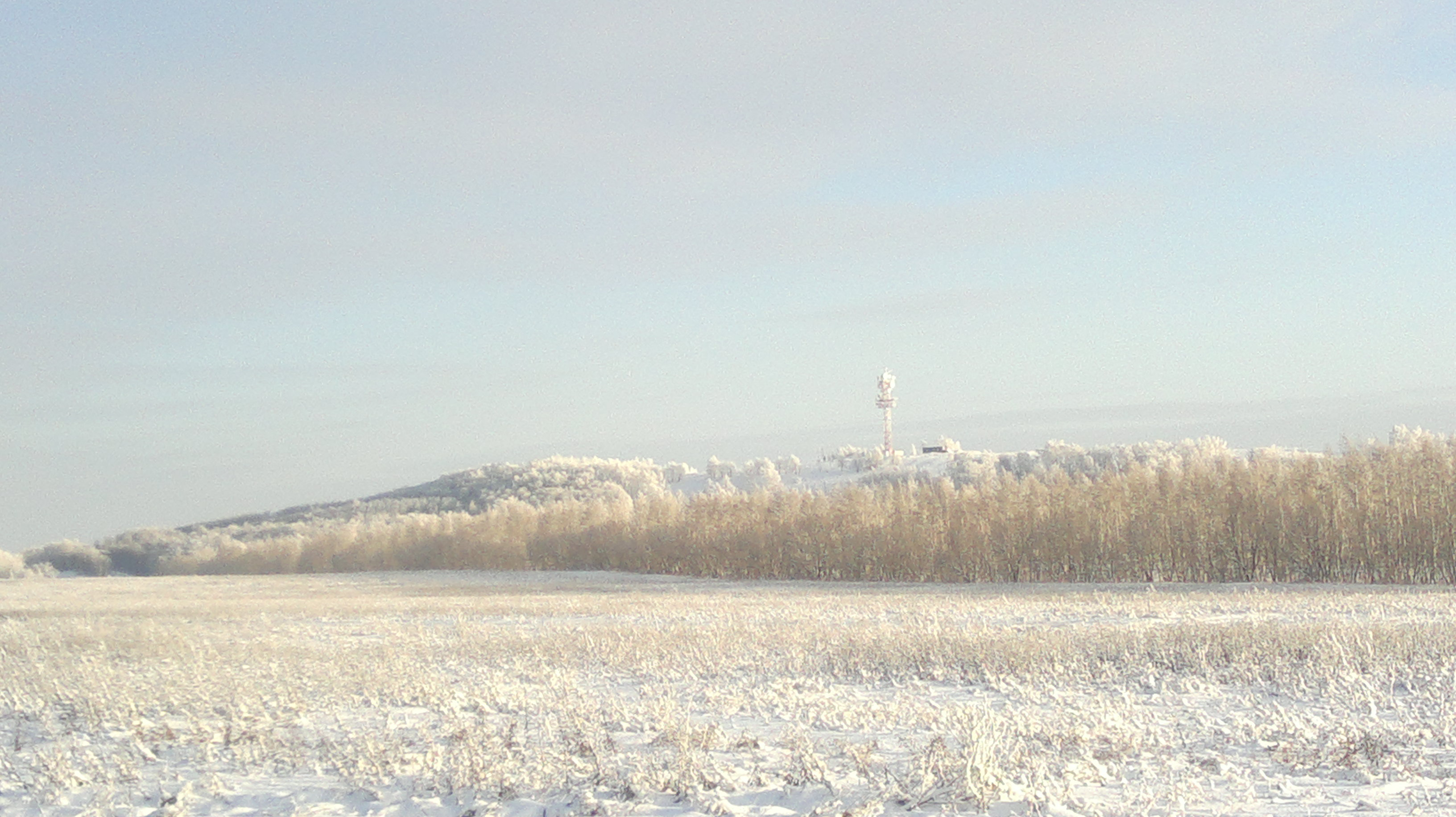
- Winter landscape in Isaklinsky District

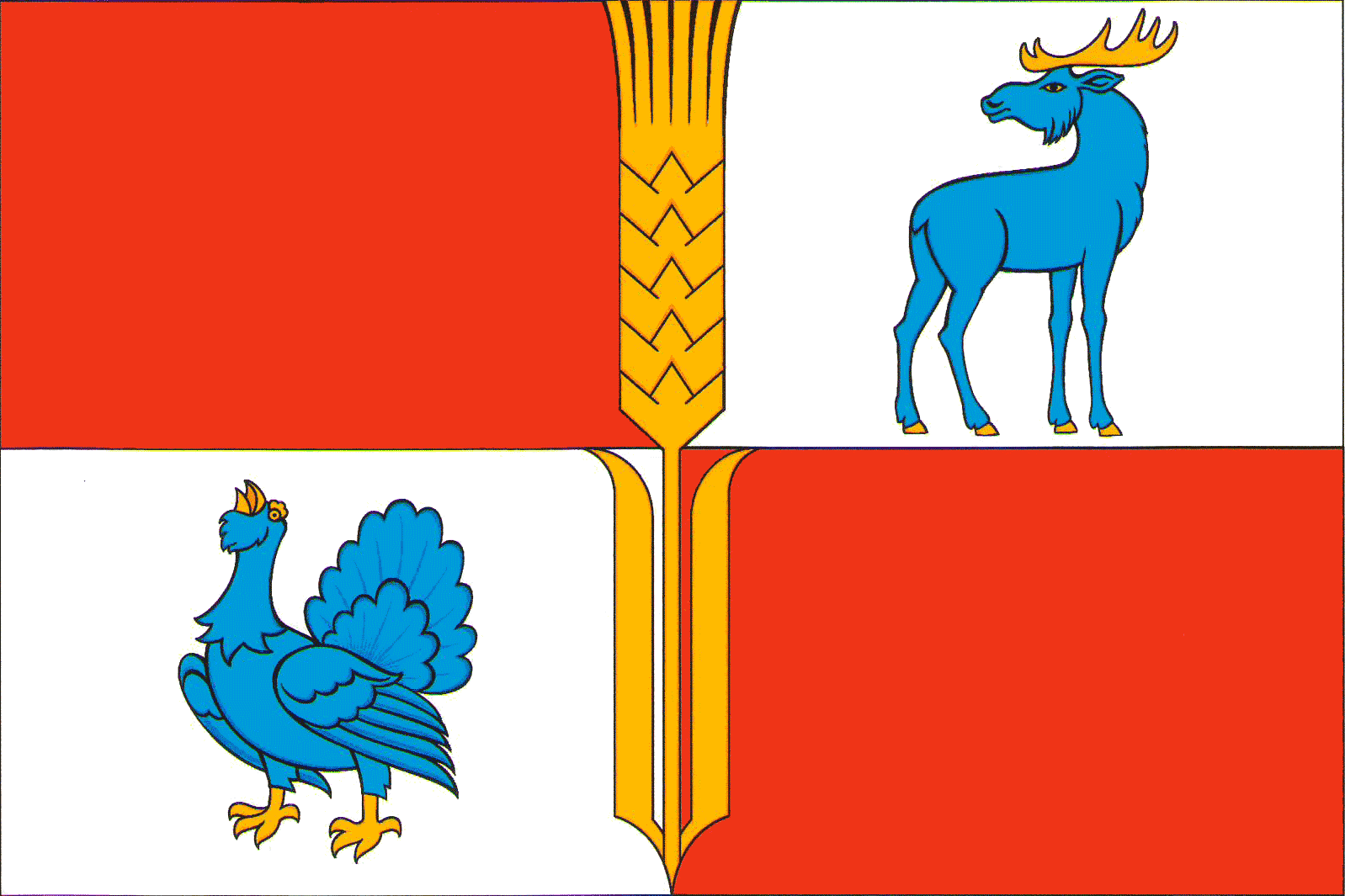
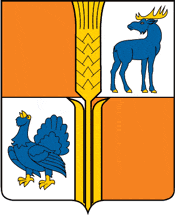
- Flag Coat of arms
- Location of Isaklinsky District in Samara Oblast
- Coordinates: 54°08′N 51°32′E
- Country: Russia
- Federal subject: Samara Oblast
- Established: 25 January 1935
- Administrative center: Isakly

Area
  - Total: 1,578 km^{2} (609 sq mi)

Population (2010 Census)
  - Total: 13,395
  - Density: 8.489/km^{2} (21.99/sq mi)
  - Urban: 0%
  - Rural: 100%

Administrative structure
  - Inhabited localities: 47 rural localities

Municipal structure
  - Municipally incorporated as: Isaklinsky Municipal District
  - Municipal divisions: 0 urban settlements, 8 rural settlements
- Time zone: UTC+4 (MSK+1)
- OKTMO ID: 36616000
- Website: http://www.isakadm.ru

Isaklinsky District (Russian: Исакли́нский райо́н) is an administrative and municipal district (raion), one of the twenty-seven in Samara Oblast, Russia. It is located in the northeast of the oblast. The area of the district is 1,578 square kilometers (609 sq mi). Its administrative center is the rural locality (a selo) of Isakly. Population: 13,395 (2010 Census); 14,733 (2002 census); 16,088 (1989 Soviet census). The population of Isakly accounts for 32.4% of the district's total population.
