= Nerchinsky Zavod =

Nerchinsky Zavod Нерчинский Завод
- Selo
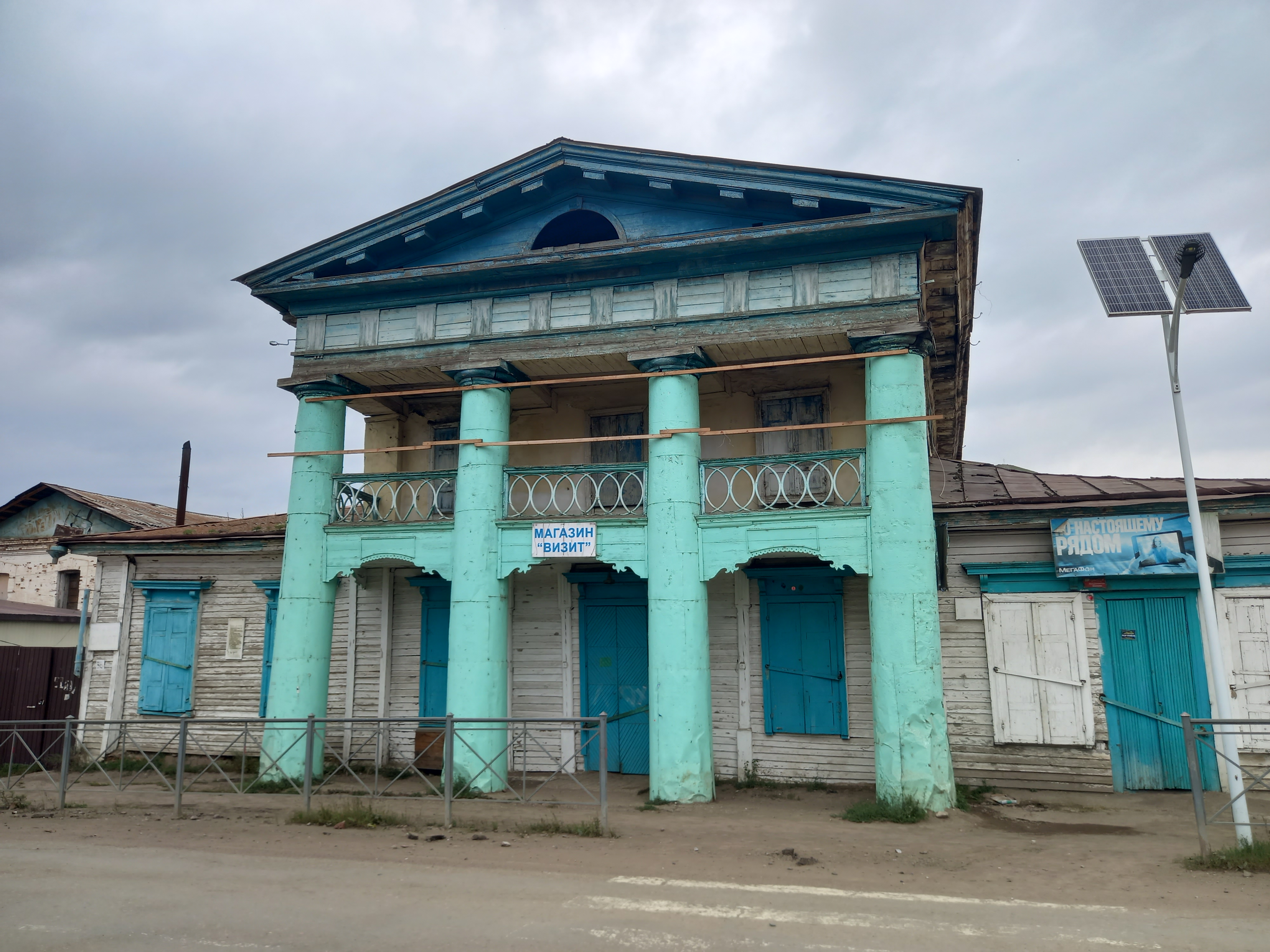
- Interactive map of Nerchinsky Zavod
- Location of Nerchinsky Zavod Nerchinsky Zavod (Zabaykalsky Krai)
- Coordinates: 51°18′N 119°37′E
- Country: Russia
- Federal subject: Zabaykalsky Krai
- Administrative district: Nerchinsko-Zavodsky District
- Founded: 1689

Population (2010 Census)
  - Total: 2,842
  - Estimate (January 2014): 2,680 (−5.7%)

Administrative status
  - Capital of: Nerchinsko-Zavodsky District

Municipal status
  - Municipal district: Nerchinsko-Zavodsky Municipal District
  - Rural settlement: Nerchinsko-Zavodskoye Rural Settlement
  - Capital of: Nerchinsko-Zavodsky Municipal District, Nerchinsko-Zavodskoye Rural Settlement
- Time zone: UTC+9 (MSK+6)
- Postal codes: 674370, 674684
- OKTMO ID: 76630445101

Nerchinsky Zavod population
- 2010 Census: 2,842
- 2002 Census: 3,149
- 1989 Census: 3,845
- 1979 Census: 3,243

Nerchinsky Zavod (Russian: Не́рчинский Заво́д) is a rural locality (a selo) and the administrative center of Nerchinsko-Zavodsky District of Zabaykalsky Krai, Russia, located near the Sino-Russian border. As of the 2010 Census, its population was 2,842.

== History ==
It was founded in 1689 by Greek mining engineers in the employ of the Russian Government. Lead and silver ore was mined by prisoners in the Nerchinsk katorga starting in 1722.

== Transportation ==
The regional road P429 leads west to Gazimursky Zavod, Shelopugino, and Sretensk; it leads east to the border with China at the selo of Olochi.

== Climate ==
Nerchinsky Zavod has a monsoon-influenced humid continental climate (Köppen climate classification Dwb), close to subarctic climate, with severely cold, dry winters and warm, rainy summers. Precipitation is quite low but is somewhat higher from June to September than at other times of the year.

Climate data for Nerchinsky Zavod (1991-2020 normals)
Month	Jan	Feb	Mar	Apr	May	Jun	Jul	Aug	Sep	Oct	Nov	Dec	Year
Record high °C (°F)	−2.0 (28.4)	4.7 (40.5)	16.6 (61.9)	28.0 (82.4)	33.7 (92.7)	40.4 (104.7)	37.7 (99.9)	36.1 (97.0)	31.0 (87.8)	25.5 (77.9)	11.8 (53.2)	1.5 (34.7)	40.4 (104.7)
Mean daily maximum °C (°F)	−21.4 (−6.5)	−14.0 (6.8)	−2.8 (27.0)	8.9 (48.0)	17.9 (64.2)	24.1 (75.4)	25.7 (78.3)	23.3 (73.9)	16.8 (62.2)	6.5 (43.7)	−8.4 (16.9)	−19.9 (−3.8)	4.7 (40.5)
Daily mean °C (°F)	−26.5 (−15.7)	−20.7 (−5.3)	−9.9 (14.2)	2.1 (35.8)	10.4 (50.7)	16.6 (61.9)	19.1 (66.4)	16.4 (61.5)	9.3 (48.7)	−0.2 (31.6)	−14.3 (6.3)	−24.7 (−12.5)	−1.9 (28.6)
Mean daily minimum °C (°F)	−30.5 (−22.9)	−26.0 (−14.8)	−16.1 (3.0)	−4.2 (24.4)	3.1 (37.6)	9.3 (48.7)	13.1 (55.6)	10.8 (51.4)	3.1 (37.6)	−5.8 (21.6)	−19.0 (−2.2)	−28.5 (−19.3)	−7.6 (18.4)
Record low °C (°F)	−53.2 (−63.8)	−47.0 (−52.6)	−37.2 (−35.0)	−27.8 (−18.0)	−11.7 (10.9)	−3.7 (25.3)	0.1 (32.2)	−3.4 (25.9)	−13.0 (8.6)	−28.7 (−19.7)	−40.0 (−40.0)	−48.9 (−56.0)	−53.2 (−63.8)
Average precipitation mm (inches)	4 (0.2)	3 (0.1)	6 (0.2)	17 (0.7)	30 (1.2)	65 (2.6)	117 (4.6)	93 (3.7)	48 (1.9)	20 (0.8)	10 (0.4)	6 (0.2)	419 (16.6)
Average precipitation days	4.9	3.7	4.3	5.5	7.2	11.7	13.8	12.4	9.4	5.1	6.2	6.5	90.7
Mean monthly sunshine hours	143	185	249	246	278	284	258	248	211	199	140	118	2,559
Source 1: climatebase.ru (precipitation days and sun)
Source 2: pogoda.ru.net (temperatures)
