= Nerchinsko-Zavodsky District =

Nerchinsko-Zavodsky District Нерчинско-Заводский район (Russian)
- District
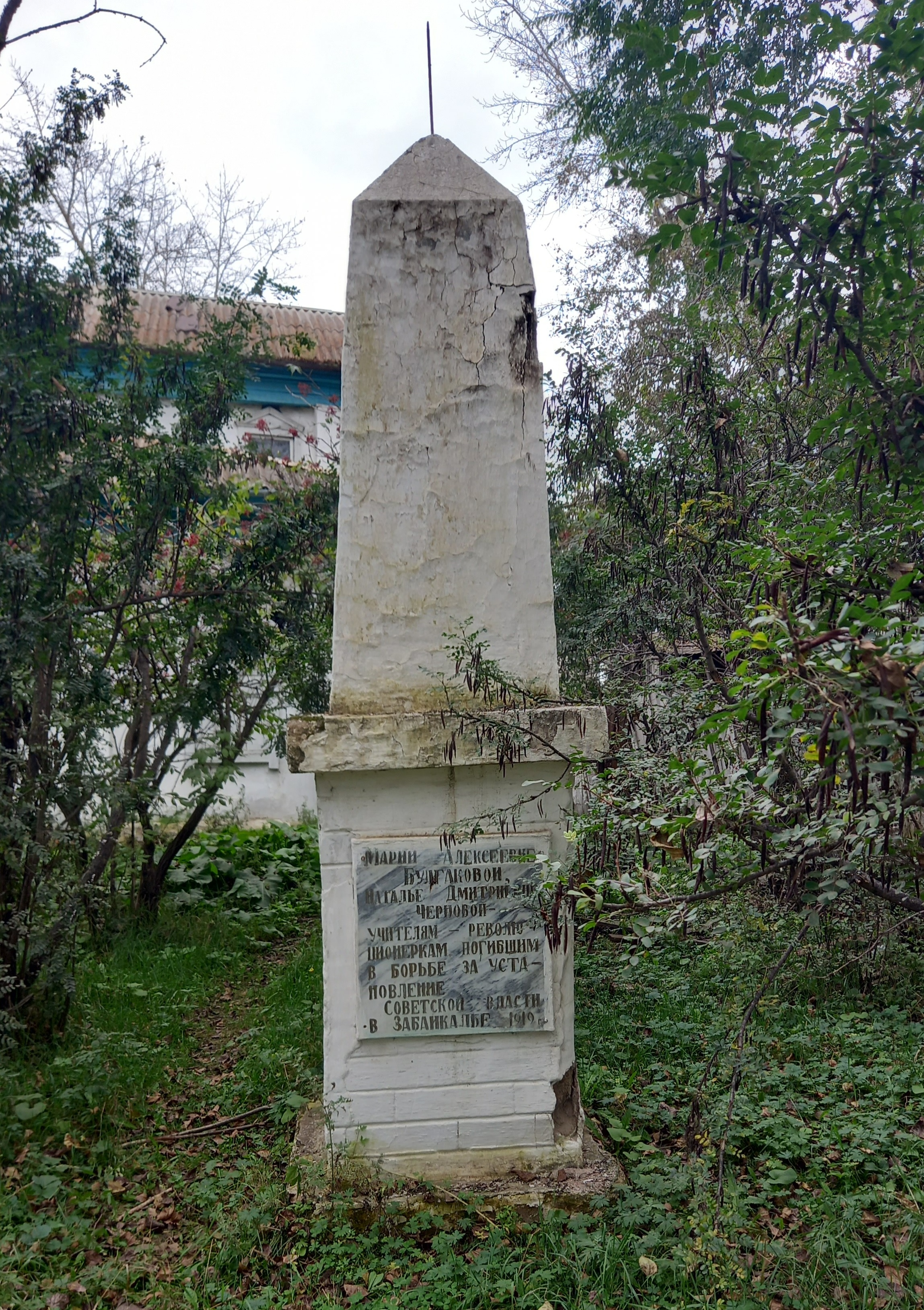

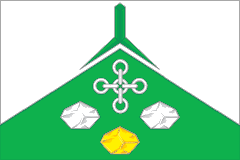
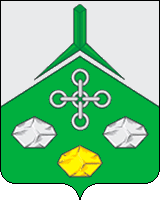
- Flag Coat of arms
- Location of Nerchinsko-Zavodsky District in Zabaykalsky Krai
- Coordinates: 51.641°N 119.821°E
- Country: Russia
- Federal subject: Zabaykalsky Krai
- Established: January 4, 1926
- Administrative center: Nerchinsky Zavod

Area
  - Total: 9,700 km^{2} (3,700 sq mi)

Population (2010 Census)
  - Total: 10,782
  - Estimate (2018): 9,428 (−12.6%)
  - Density: 1.1/km^{2} (2.9/sq mi)
  - Urban: 0%
  - Rural: 100%

Administrative structure
  - Inhabited localities: 24 rural localities

Municipal structure
  - Municipally incorporated as: Nerchinsko-Zavodsky Municipal District
  - Municipal divisions: 0 urban settlements, 15 rural settlements
- Time zone: UTC+9 (MSK+6)
- OKTMO ID: 76630000
- Website: http://xn----8sbgibn3bnn.xn--80aaaac8algcbgbck3fl0q.xn--p1ai/

Nerchinsko-Zavodsky District (Russian: Нерчинско-Заводский райо́н) is an administrative and municipal district (raion), one of the thirty-one in Zabaykalsky Krai, Russia. It is located in the east and southeast of the krai, and borders with Gazimuro-Zavodsky District in the north, and Kalgansky District in the south. The area of the district is 9,700 square kilometers (3,700 sq mi). Its administrative center is the rural locality (a selo) of Nerchinsky Zavod. Population: 10,782 (2010 census); 12,499 (2002 Census); 15,605 (1989 Soviet census). The population of Nerchinsky Zavod accounts for 26.4% of the district's total population.

== History ==
The district was established on January 4, 1926.
