= Gazimursky Zavod =

Gazimursky Zavod Газимурский Завод
- Selo
- Interactive map of Gazimursky Zavod
- Location of Gazimursky Zavod Gazimursky Zavod (Zabaykalsky Krai)
- Coordinates: 51°32′48″N 118°20′29″E
- Country: Russia
- Federal subject: Zabaykalsky Krai
- Administrative district: Gazimuro-Zavodsky District
- Founded: 1774

Population
  - Estimate (2010): 2,657 )

Administrative status
  - Capital of: Gazimuro-Zavodsky District

Municipal status
  - Municipal district: Gazimuro-Zavodsky Municipal District
  - Rural settlement: Gazimuro-Zavodskoye Rural Settlement
  - Capital of: Gazimuro-Zavodsky Municipal District, Gazimuro-Zavodskoye Rural Settlement
- Time zone: UTC+9 (MSK+6)
- Postal code: 673630
- Dialing code: +7 30247
- OKTMO ID: 76610409101

Gazimursky Zavod (Russian: Газиму́рский Заво́д) is a rural locality (a selo) and the administrative center of Gazimuro-Zavodsky District of Zabaykalsky Krai, Russia, located on the right bank of the Gazimur River about 600 kilometers (370 mi) southeast of Chita. With a population of 2,657 as of 2010 census.

== Geography ==
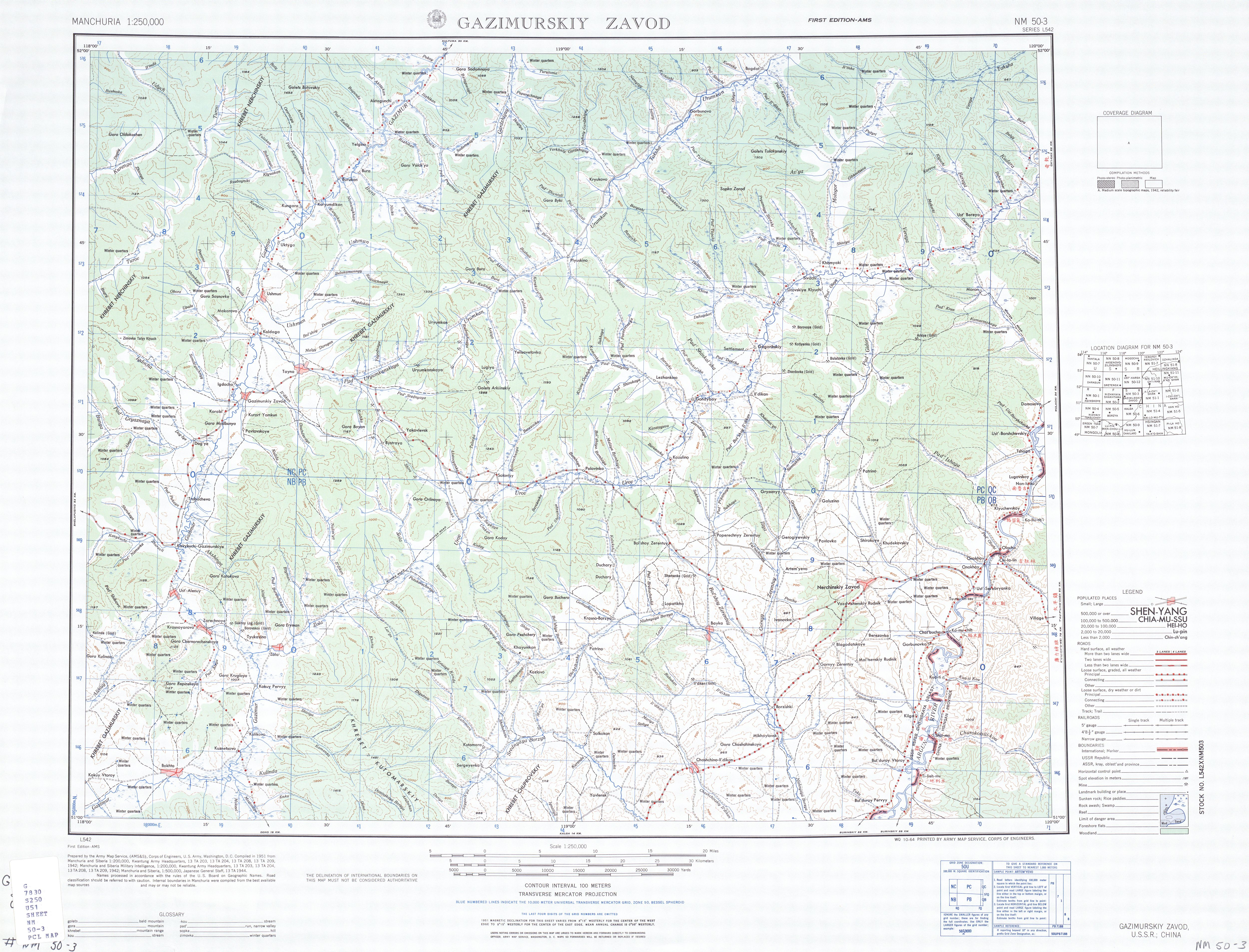
Gazimursky Zavod (labelled as Gazimurskiy Zavod) (1951)

Gazimursky Zavod stands on the right bank of the Gazimur River, which is a left tributary of the Argun. Its location in the Gazimur River basin is between the mountains of southeastern Transbaikal, about 600 kilometers (370 mi) southeast of Chita. To the northwest rise the Borshchovochnye Mountains, about 1,000 meters (3,300 ft) high; to the southeast are the Uryumkan Mountains with the peak Vershina Baydonki (1,325 m (4,347 ft)); to the northeast are the Gazimur Mountains with Ushmunsky Golets (1,372 m (4,501 ft)).

== History ==
In 1773, silver and lead were found close to the village of Tayna. A small smelter was built in 1774–1778 and a settlement grew around it. In 1779, it became a seat of a volost. Destroyed by high waters, it was rebuilt and extended in 1789–1790.

Their leader Yegor Barbot de Marny (1743–1796) planned to transfer the management of all Southeast Transbaikalia's extensive mining region here from Nerchinsky Zavod, where the ore was exhausted. Since the expectations at Gazimursky Zavod were also not fulfilled, the plan did not succeed.

The plant was expanded again in 1832. In 1834 there were 330 workers, including many exiles. However, in 1846 the smelter was closed. In 1837, there were 141 households in Gazimursky Zavod, and by 1860 their number declined to 109.

In 1851, the first staff of the First Infantry Brigade of the Trans-Baikal Cossacks troops was in Gazimursky Zavod. A hospital was established, which was open also for the civilian population. From 1872 to 1918, the Third Infantry division was stationed there.

On January 4, 1926, Gazimursky Zavod became the administrative center of its eponymous district. In 1934, a Machine and Tractor Station was established in the selo. In 1961, thirteen kolkhozes in the raion were consolidated into two sovkhozes. The administration of one of the sovkhozes was in Gazimursky Zavod.

== Economy ==
Today Gazimursky Zavod is mainly a center of agriculture and forestry. It also houses most utilities of the district.

=== Transportation ===
Gazimursky Zavod is on the regional road R429 which connects it to Sretensk 173 kilometers (107 mi) to the northwest. Sretensk is also the nearest railway station, the terminus of a branch line of the Trans-Siberian Railway. The R429 leads southeast to Nerchinsky Zavod, 109 kilometers (68 mi) away, and on to Olochi, a village on the Argun River, navigable from there, and on the border with China. Another road from Gazimursky Zavod leads to villages downstream the Gazimur River.

Since the 1970s, there was an air connection to Chita, but it came to a halt in the 1990s. The small airfield was closed in 2001.

In 2007, Norilsk Nickel and the Russian Railways signed an agreement to build a 375-kilometer (233 mi) railway Naryn–Lugokan, branching the Krasnokamensk railway, primarily focused on the transportation of significant molybdenum, antimony, copper, gold, and other ore deposits in the region.

== Demographics ==
In recent decades, the population was almost constant, whereas the population declined in many places of Transbaikalia.

- 1959: 2,929
- 1989 census: 2,497
- 2002 census: 2,465
- 2010 census: 2,657

== Culture ==
There is a museum of local lore, founded in 1962, in Gazimursky Zavod. Other facilities include a cultural center and a library.

== See also ==
- Shiwei, Inner Mongolia, on the Chinese side of the nearby Friendship Bridge
