= Gazimuro-Zavodsky District =

Gazimuro-Zavodsky District Газимуро-Заводский район (Russian)
- District
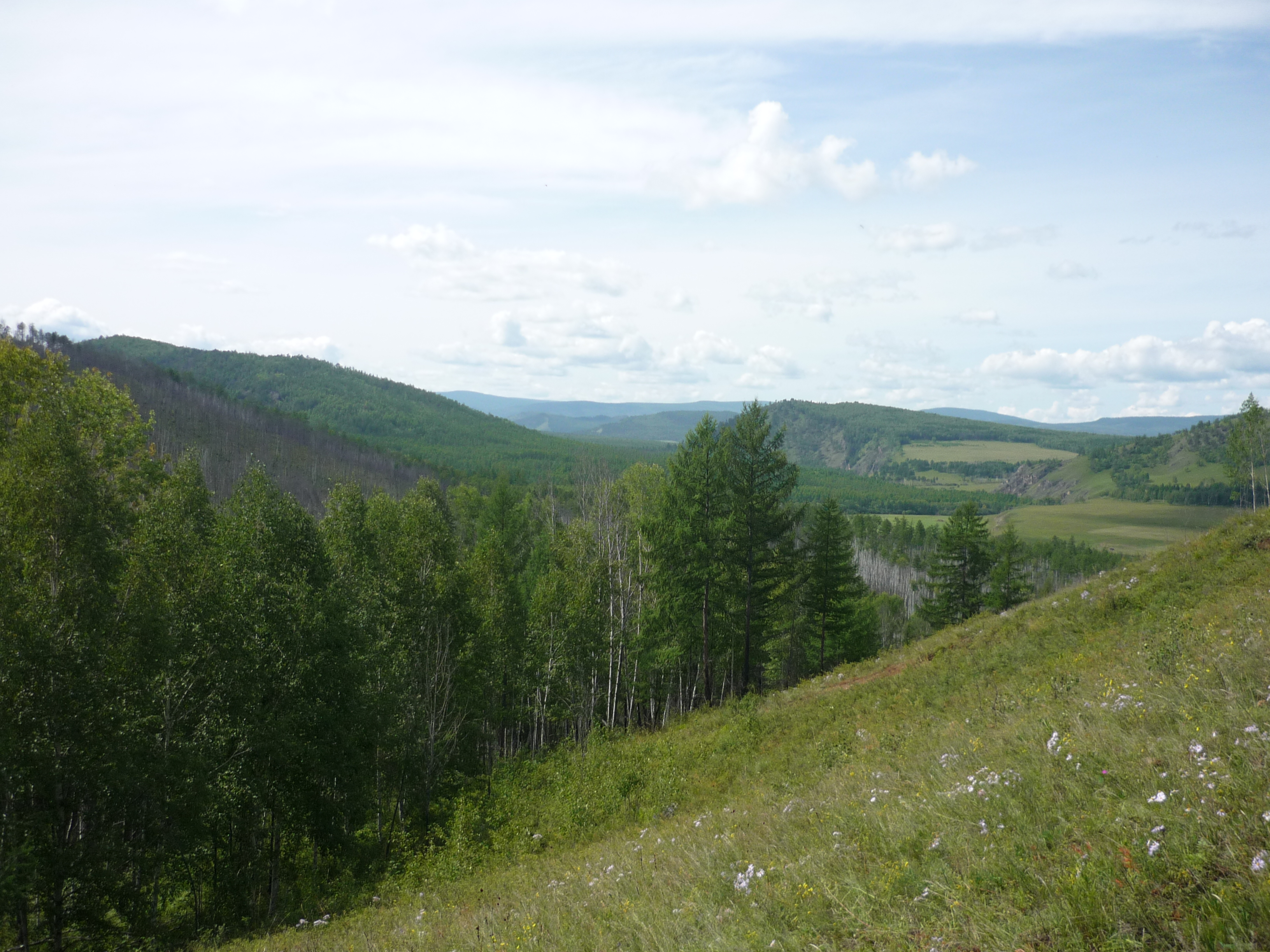
- View in Gazimuro-Zavodsky

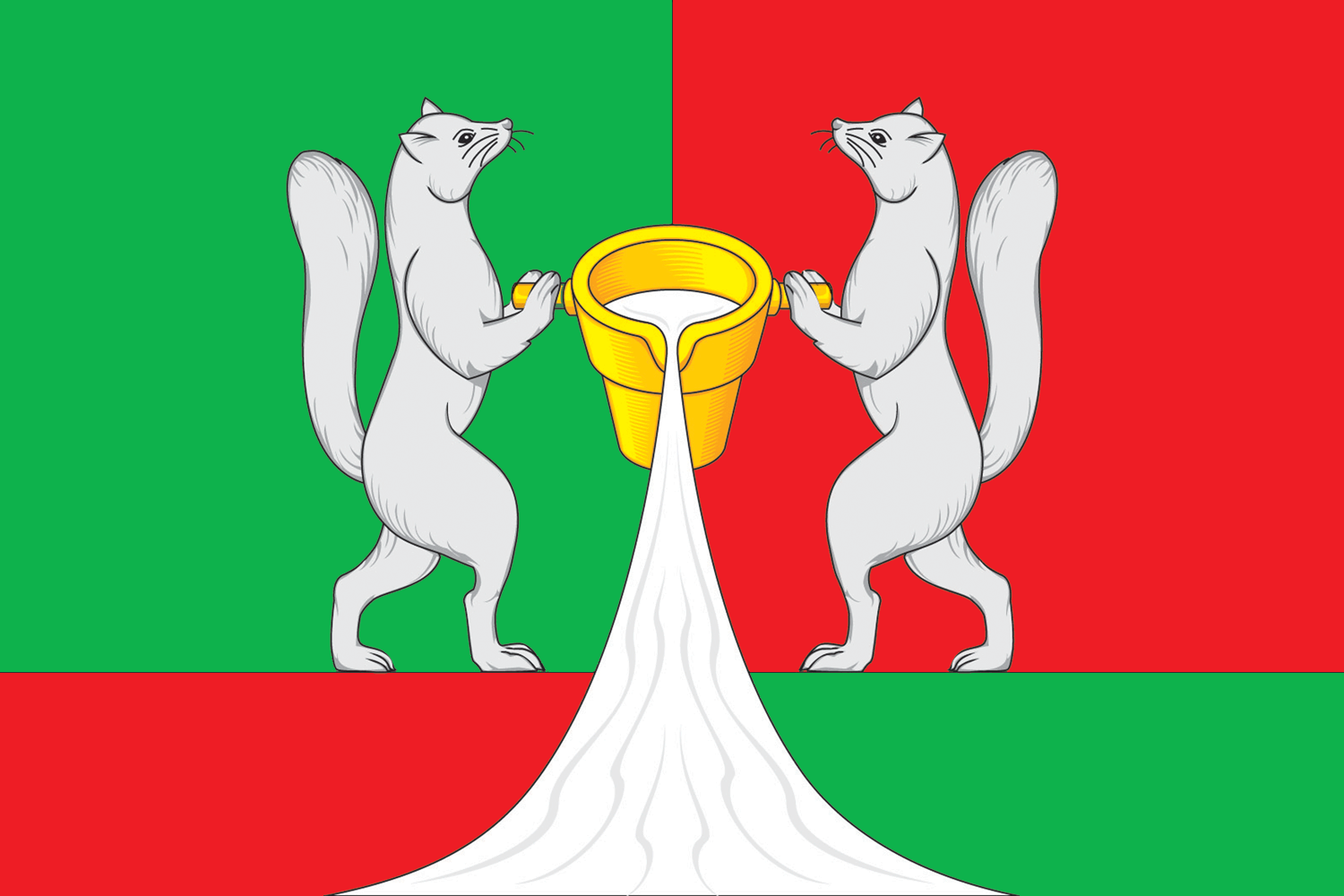
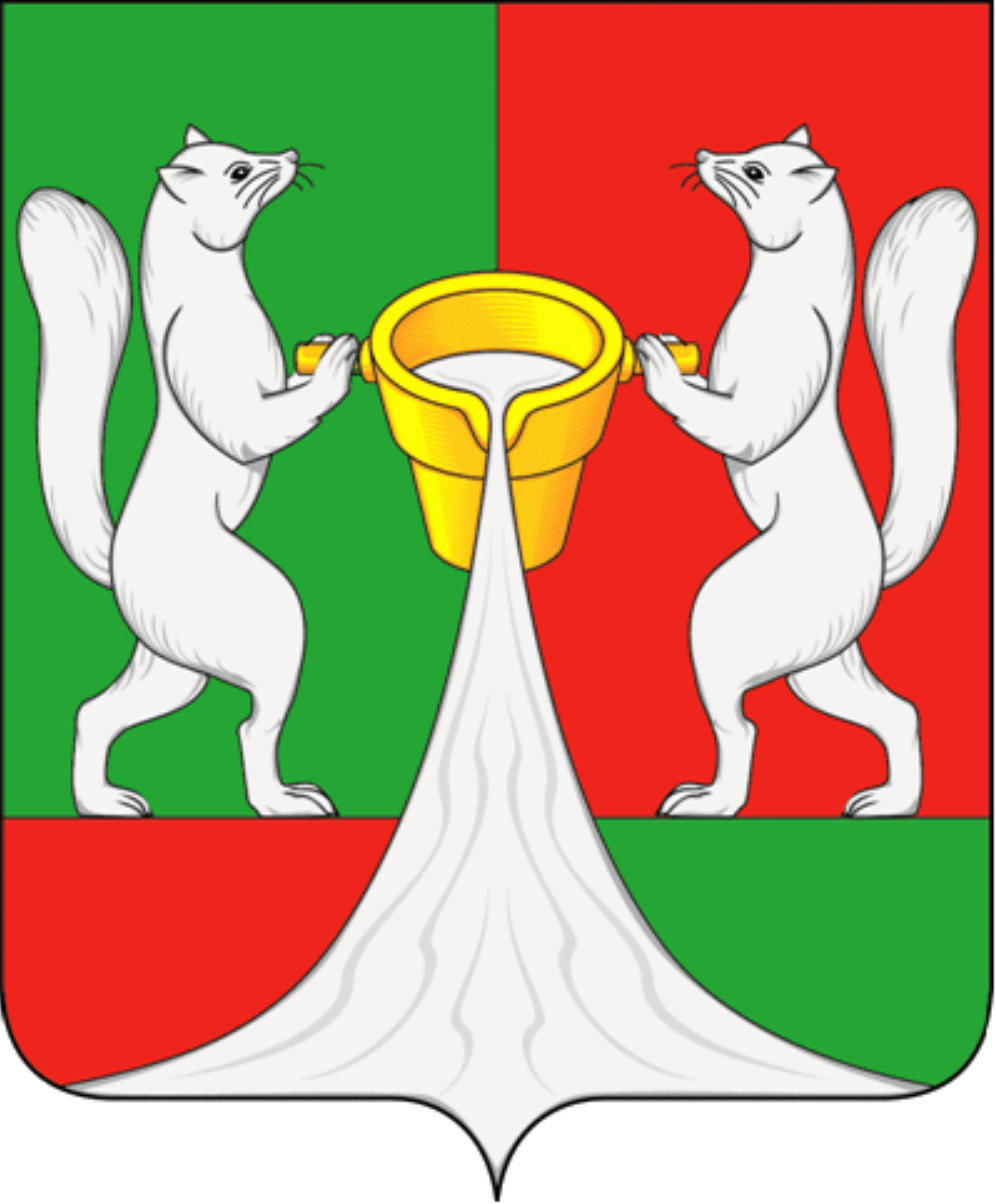
- Flag Coat of arms
- Location of Gazimuro-Zavodsky District in Zabaykalsky Krai
- Coordinates: 52.145°N 119.546°E
- Country: Russia
- Federal subject: Zabaykalsky Krai
- Established: January 4, 1926
- Administrative center: Gazimursky Zavod

Area
  - Total: 14,400 km^{2} (5,600 sq mi)

Population (2010 Census)
  - Total: 9,407
  - Estimate (2018): 8,812 (−6.3%)
  - Density: 0.653/km^{2} (1.69/sq mi)
  - Urban: 0%
  - Rural: 100%

Administrative structure
  - Inhabited localities: 28 rural localities

Municipal structure
  - Municipally incorporated as: Gazimuro-Zavodsky Municipal District
  - Municipal divisions: 0 urban settlements, 9 rural settlements
- Time zone: UTC+9 (MSK+6)
- OKTMO ID: 76610000
- Website: http://gazzavod.ucoz.ru/

Gazimuro-Zavodsky District (Russian: Газимуро-Заводский район) is an administrative and municipal district (raion), one of the thirty-one in Zabaykalsky Krai, Russia. It is located in the east and southeast of the krai, and borders with Mogochinsky District in the north, Nerchinsko-Zavodsky District in the east, Aleksandrovo-Zavodsky District in the south, and with Sretensky District in the west. The area of the district is 14,400 square kilometers (5,600 sq mi). Its administrative center is the rural locality (a selo) of Gazimursky Zavod. Population: 9,407 (2010 census); 9,578 (2002 Census); 11,153 (1989 Soviet census). The population of Gazimursky Zavod accounts for 28.2% of the district's total population.

== History ==
The district was established on January 4, 1926.
