= Alexandrovsky Zavod =

Alexandrovsky Zavod Александровский Завод
- Selo
- Interactive map of Alexandrovsky Zavod
- Location of Alexandrovsky Zavod Alexandrovsky Zavod (Zabaykalsky Krai)
- Coordinates: 50°55′N 117°56′E
- Country: Russia
- Federal subject: Zabaykalsky Krai
- Administrative district: Alexandrovo-Zavodsky District
- Founded: 1792
- Elevation: 795 m (2,608 ft)

Population (2010 Census)
  - Total: 2,482
  - Estimate (2010): 2,482 (0%)

Administrative status
  - Capital of: Alexandrovo-Zavodsky District
- Time zone: UTC+9 (MSK+6)
- Postal code: 674640
- OKTMO ID: 76604412101

Alexandrovsky Zavod (Russian: Александровский Завод) is a rural locality (a selo) and the administrative center of Alexandrovo-Zavodsky District of Zabaykalsky Krai, Russia.

== Geography ==
It is located on the river Gazimur, 510 km to the south-east from Chita, 130 km to the north-east from the nearest railway station. There is a library, a hospital, a post office and other social and welfare facilities.

== History ==
Alexandrovsky Zavod was founded in 1792 in connection with the establishment of a silver mining and metallurgical plant. In 1825, it received its present name after the death in the same year Russian Emperor Alexander I. The town has been the home to political prisoners since 1832. The plant was closed in 1863. In 1926, it became the capital of the district. A museum opened in the house of Nikolay Chernyshevsky in 1969. An airport operated in the town until the 1990s.

== Demographics ==
Population: 2,482 (2010 census); 2,630 (2002 census); 2,924 (1989 Soviet census).
