= Alexandrovo-Zavodsky District =

Alexandrovo-Zavodsky District Александрово-Заводский район (Russian)
- District
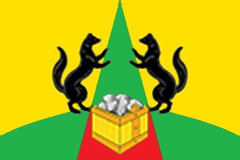
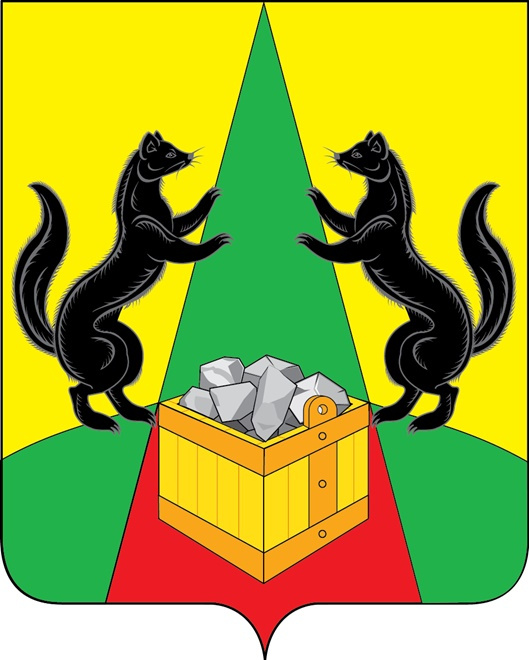
- Flag Coat of arms
- Location of Alexandrovo-Zavodsky District in Zabaykalsky Krai
- Coordinates: 50.924°N 117.932°E
- Country: Russia
- Federal subject: Zabaykalsky Krai
- Established: January 4, 1926
- Administrative center: Alexandrovsky Zavod

Area
  - Total: 7,100 km^{2} (2,700 sq mi)

Population (2010 Census)
  - Total: 8,726
  - Estimate (2018): 7,580 (−13.1%)
  - Density: 1.2/km^{2} (3.2/sq mi)
  - Urban: 0%
  - Rural: 100%

Administrative structure
  - Inhabited localities: 27 rural localities

Municipal structure
  - Municipally incorporated as: Alexandrovo-Zavodsky Municipal District
  - Municipal divisions: 0 urban settlements, 13 rural settlements
- Time zone: UTC+9 (MSK+6)
- OKTMO ID: 76604000
- Website: https://alzav.75.ru/

Alexandrovo-Zavodsky District (Russian: Алекса́ндрово-Заво́дский райо́н) is an administrative and municipal district (raion), one of the thirty-one in Zabaykalsky Krai, Russia. It is located in the southeast of the krai, and borders with Shelopuginsky District in the north, Gazimuro-Zavodsky District in the northeast, Kalgansky District in the east, Krasnokamensky District in the south, Priargunsky District in the southeast, and with Borzinsky District in the west. The area of the district is 7,100 square kilometers (2,700 sq mi). Its administrative center is the rural locality (a selo) of Alexandrovsky Zavod. Population: 8,726 (2010 census); 10,844 (2002 Census); 14,990 (1989 Soviet census). The population of Alexandrovsky Zavod accounts for 28.4% of the district's total population.

== Geography ==
The highest point of the district is Mount Uchashchina, at 1,412 meters (4,633 ft). The Gazimur and the Borzya Rivers flow through the district. The district's mineral reserves include the Bugdainskoe mine, which contain one of the largest molybdenum reserves in Russia.

== History ==
Russians explored the region in the 17th century. In 1778, silver deposits were discovered here, and the first silver mine, which was included into the network of Nerchinsk silver refineries, was built in the village of Bazanovo. Catherine the Great ordered to give additional money to the network in 1790. As a result, on the spot of modern Alexandrovsky Zavod appeared a silver works in 1792, which later was named after Alexander I. All the workers of the works were political and penal criminals. The most famous of them was an ideologue of Russian Socialism, Nikolay Chernyshevsky.

After the silver resources depletion in the late 1880s, population comprised Cossacks and peasants who took active part in Russian revolutions.

The district in its modern form was established on January 4, 1926.

In the 1930s, there was Cossack and peasant unrest caused by collectivization. There were massive deportations and repressions. World War II caused an enormous decrease in manpower and the district's industry.

The population of the district suffers from different oncological diseases.
