= Sretensk =

Town in Zabaykalsky Krai, Russia

Sretensk Сретенск
- Town
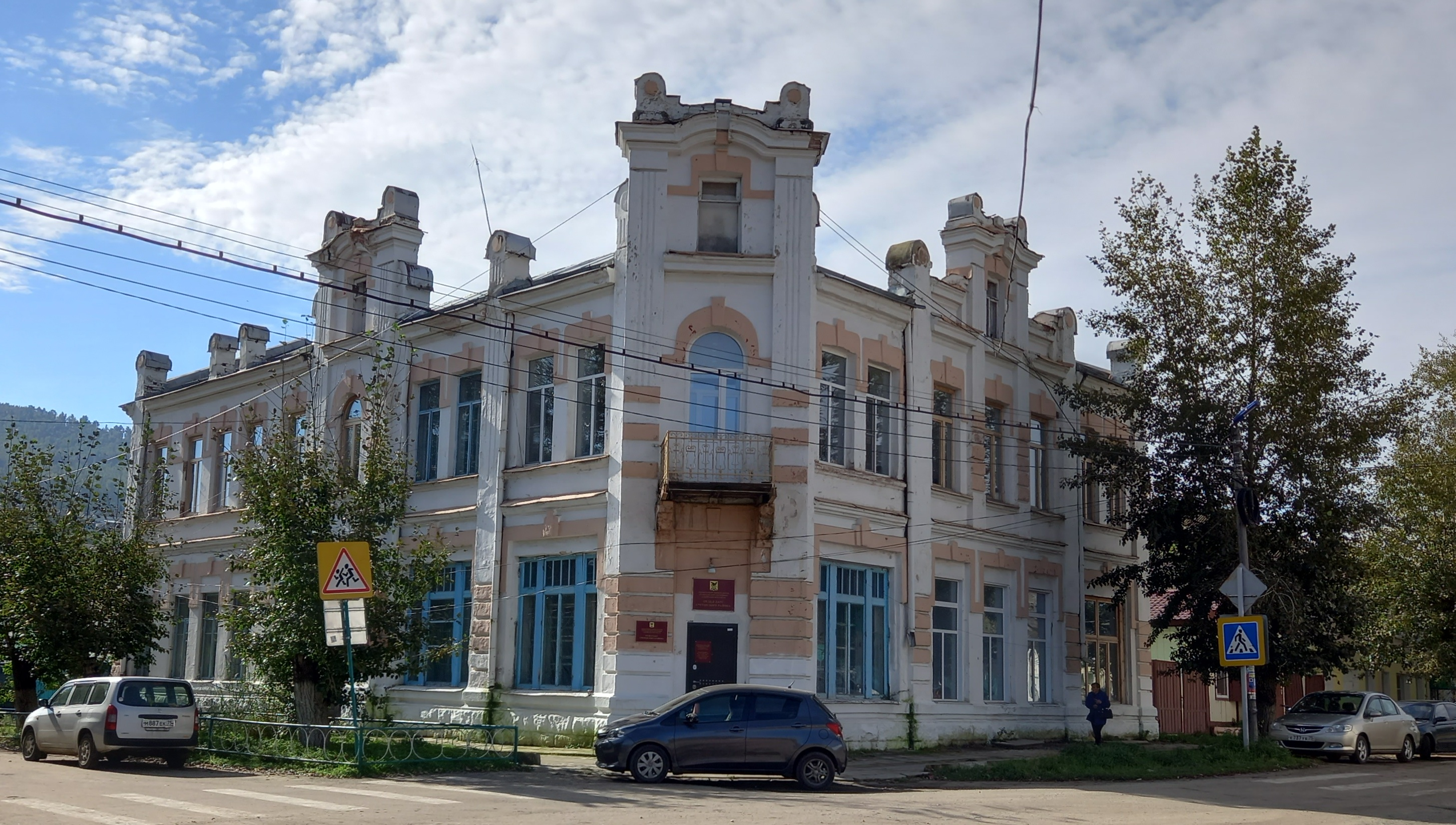

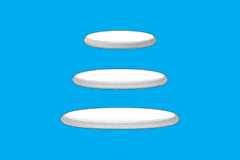
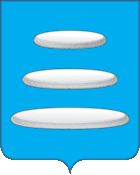
- Flag Coat of arms
- Interactive map of Sretensk
- Location of Sretensk Sretensk (Zabaykalsky Krai)
- Coordinates: 52°15′N 117°43′E
- Country: Russia
- Federal subject: Zabaykalsky Krai
- Administrative district: Sretensky District
- Founded: 1689
- Town status since: 1926
- Elevation: 490 m (1,610 ft)

Population (2010 Census)
  - Total: 6,850
  - Estimate (1 January 2018): 6,581 (−3.9%)

Administrative status
  - Capital of: Sretensky District

Municipal status
  - Municipal district: Sretensky Municipal District
  - Urban settlement: Sretenskoye Urban Settlement
  - Capital of: Sretensky Municipal District, Sretenskoye Urban Settlement
- Time zone: UTC+9 (MSK+6)
- Postal codes: 673500, 673504
- OKTMO ID: 76640101001

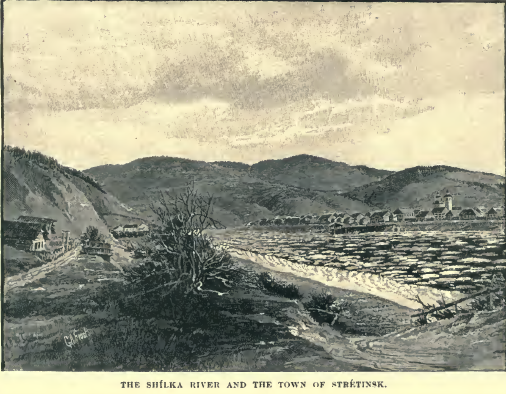
Sretensk, 1885

Sretensk (Russian: Сретенск, IPA: [ˈsrʲetʲɪnsk]) is a town and the administrative center of Sretensky District in Zabaykalsky Krai, Russia, located on the right bank of the Shilka River (Amur basin), 385 kilometers (239 mi) east of Chita, the administrative center of the krai. Population: 6,850 (2010 census); 8,192 (2002 census); 10,445 (1989 Soviet census).

== History ==
The town was founded in 1689 and was granted town status in 1926. The Trans-Siberian Railway reached the town in 1897; until the construction of the Chinese Eastern Railway, this was the end of the line. At the time, transport was the town's largest industry; the town served as a transshipment point between the railway, the Amur and Shilka rivers, and carriages or carts. Prisoners sentenced to exile in the Nerchinsk katorga would be transferred from trains to carriages here.

During the Russo-Japanese War, troops were stationed there, as well as Vladivostok and Khabarovsk. Between October 1914 and 1921, it accommodated the Sretensk prisoner of war camp.

== Administrative and municipal status ==
Within the framework of administrative divisions, Sretensk serves as the administrative center of Sretensky District, to which it is directly subordinated. As a municipal division, the town of Sretensk, together with one rural locality (the selo of Morgul), is incorporated within Sretensky Municipal District as Sretenskoye Urban Settlement.

== Transportation ==
The P426 road leads west to Nerchinsk. The P429 road leads west to Shelopugino, Gazimursky Zavod, Nerchinsky Zavod, and eventually to the border with China.

== Climate ==
Sretensk has a cold humid continental climate (Köppen climate classification Dwb) bordering closely on a subarctic climate (Köppen climate classification Dwc), with severely cold winters and very warm summers. Precipitation is quite low but is much higher in summer than at other times of the year.

Climate data for Sretensk
Month	Jan	Feb	Mar	Apr	May	Jun	Jul	Aug	Sep	Oct	Nov	Dec	Year
Record high °C (°F)	−0.6 (30.9)	3.5 (38.3)	20.1 (68.2)	31.7 (89.1)	34.7 (94.5)	41.3 (106.3)	39.7 (103.5)	36.7 (98.1)	31.7 (89.1)	26.7 (80.1)	11.7 (53.1)	2.6 (36.7)	41.3 (106.3)
Mean daily maximum °C (°F)	−21.0 (−5.8)	−12.8 (9.0)	−1.9 (28.6)	9.7 (49.5)	18.6 (65.5)	24.9 (76.8)	26.5 (79.7)	23.7 (74.7)	17.0 (62.6)	6.8 (44.2)	−8.5 (16.7)	−20.3 (−4.5)	5.2 (41.4)
Daily mean °C (°F)	−27.4 (−17.3)	−21.1 (−6.0)	−10.0 (14.0)	2.3 (36.1)	10.6 (51.1)	16.9 (62.4)	19.4 (66.9)	16.6 (61.9)	9.3 (48.7)	−0.5 (31.1)	−15.0 (5.0)	−26.0 (−14.8)	−2.1 (28.3)
Mean daily minimum °C (°F)	−32.9 (−27.2)	−28.4 (−19.1)	−18.0 (−0.4)	−4.9 (23.2)	2.7 (36.9)	9.5 (49.1)	13.3 (55.9)	11.1 (52.0)	3.1 (37.6)	−6.4 (20.5)	−20.6 (−5.1)	−31.0 (−23.8)	−8.5 (16.6)
Record low °C (°F)	−50.7 (−59.3)	−48.6 (−55.5)	−40.0 (−40.0)	−24.7 (−12.5)	−10.2 (13.6)	−4.0 (24.8)	0.6 (33.1)	−2.6 (27.3)	−12.5 (9.5)	−29.3 (−20.7)	−41.1 (−42.0)	−48.4 (−55.1)	−50.7 (−59.3)
Average precipitation mm (inches)	3.9 (0.15)	2.9 (0.11)	4.1 (0.16)	12.1 (0.48)	33.2 (1.31)	63.0 (2.48)	98.0 (3.86)	91.9 (3.62)	47.6 (1.87)	14.3 (0.56)	9.6 (0.38)	7.2 (0.28)	387.8 (15.26)
Average precipitation days (≥ 0.1 mm)	6.0	4.5	4.3	5.4	7.3	11.3	14.2	13.4	9.4	5.3	7.1	8.1	96.3
Average relative humidity (%)	73.4	69.3	60.0	46.8	46.6	60.4	68.6	71.4	66.3	61.5	71.2	75.1	64.2
Mean monthly sunshine hours	151	191	246	235	262	261	242	211	193	195	150	120	2,457
Source: Pogoda.ru.net (humidity, sunshine and precip. days)
