= Sretensky District =

Sretensky District Сретенский район (Russian)
- District
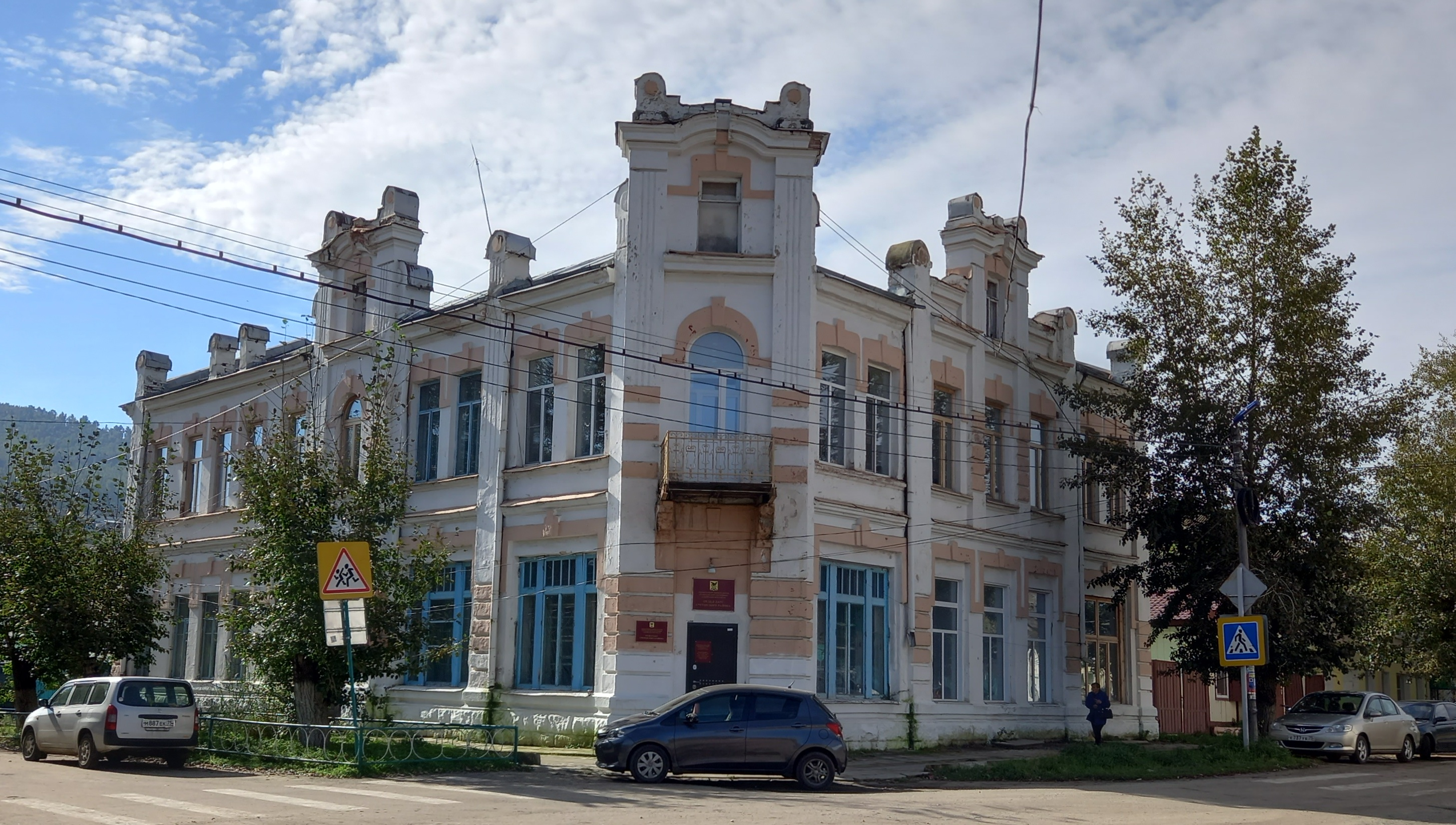
- Sretensk

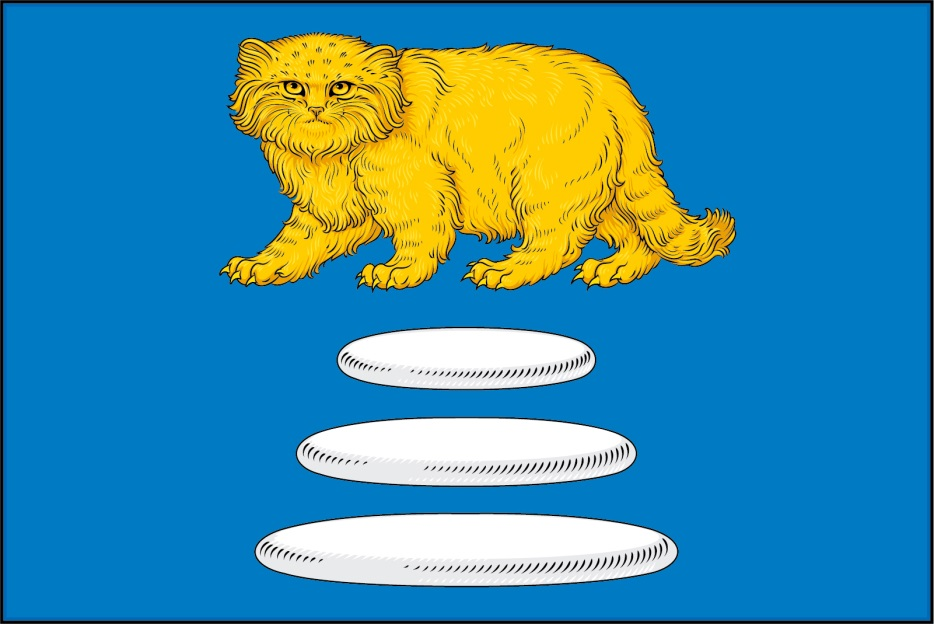
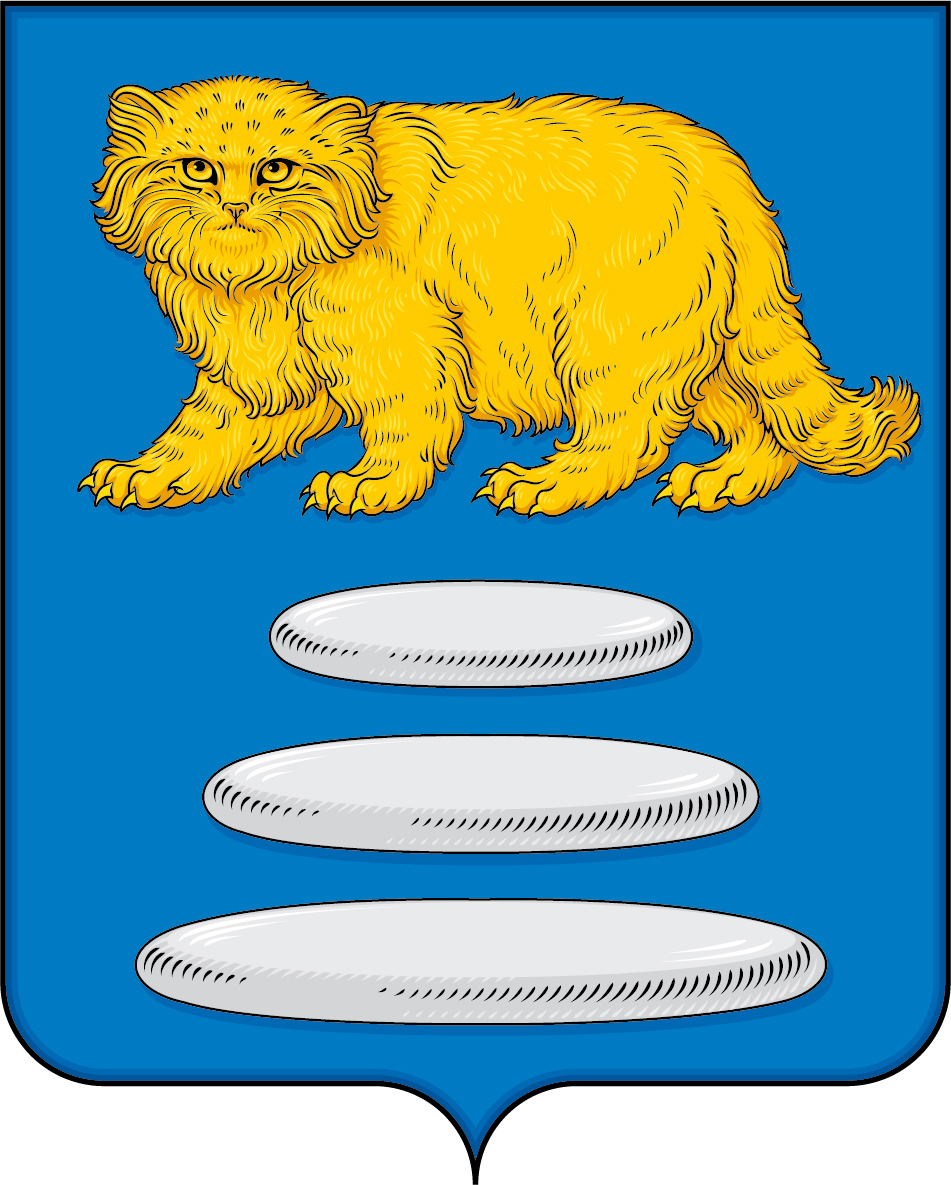
- Flag Coat of arms
- Location of Sretensky District in Zabaykalsky Krai
- Coordinates: 52.566°N 118.495°E
- Country: Russia
- Federal subject: Zabaykalsky Krai
- Established: January 26, 1926
- Administrative center: Sretensk

Area
  - Total: 15,600 km^{2} (6,000 sq mi)

Population (2010 Census)
  - Total: 23,311
  - Estimate (2018): 21,569 (−7.5%)
  - Density: 1.49/km^{2} (3.87/sq mi)
  - Urban: 68.3%
  - Rural: 31.7%

Administrative structure
  - Inhabited localities: 1 cities/towns, 2 urban-type settlements, 38 rural localities

Municipal structure
  - Municipally incorporated as: Sretensky Municipal District
  - Municipal divisions: 3 urban settlements, 11 rural settlements
- Time zone: UTC+9 (MSK+6)
- OKTMO ID: 76640000
- Website: http://xn--e1aaplmfef.xn--80aaaac8algcbgbck3fl0q.xn--p1ai/

Sretensky District (Russian: Сретенский райо́н) is an administrative and municipal district (raion), one of the thirty-one in Zabaykalsky Krai, Russia. It is located in the east of the krai, and borders with Mogochinsky District in the north, Gazimuro-Zavodsky District in the east, and with District in the west. The area of the district is 15,600 square kilometers (6,000 sq mi). Its administrative center is the town of Sretensk. Population: 23,311 (2010 census); 27,524 (2002 Census); 33,236 (1989 Soviet census). The population of Sretensk accounts for 29.4% of the district's total population.

== History ==
The district was established on January 26, 1926.
