= Ustye =

Ustye (Russian: У́стье) is a placename in Russia. Literally it means "river mouth". It may refer to several places in Russia:

== Arkhangelsk Oblast ==
- Ustye, Arkhangelsk Oblast, a village in Ryabovsky Selsoviet of Lensky District

== Chuvash Republic ==
- Ustye, Chuvash Republic, a selo in Pitishevskoye Rural Settlement of Alikovsky District

== Chelyabinsk Oblast ==
- Ustye, Chelyabinsk Oblast, archeological site of Sintashta culture

== Ivanovo Oblast ==
- Ustye, Ivanovo Oblast, a village in Komsomolsky District

== Kaluga Oblast ==
- Ustye, Dzerzhinsky District, Kaluga Oblast, a village in Dzerzhinsky District
- Ustye, Zhizdrinsky District, Kaluga Oblast, a village in Zhizdrinsky District

== Republic of Karelia ==
- Ustye, Republic of Karelia, a settlement in Prionezhsky District

== Kirov Oblast ==
- Ustye, Podosinovsky District, Kirov Oblast, a village under the administrative jurisdiction of the urban-type settlement of Podosinovets, Podosinovsky District
- Ustye, Tuzhinsky District, Kirov Oblast, a village in Pachinsky Rural Okrug of Tuzhinsky District
- Ustye, Yuryansky District, Kirov Oblast, a village in Medyansky Rural Okrug of Yuryansky District

== Krasnoyarsk Krai ==
- Ustye, Krasnoyarsk Krai, a settlement in Mashukovsky Selsoviet of Motyginsky District

== Leningrad Oblast ==
- Ustye, Tikhvinsky District, Leningrad Oblast, a village in Tsvylevskoye Settlement Municipal Formation of Tikhvinsky District
- Ustye, Volosovsky District, Leningrad Oblast, a village in Sabskoye Settlement Municipal Formation of Volosovsky District

== Moscow Oblast ==
- Ustye, Naro-Fominsky District, Moscow Oblast, a village in Volchenkovskoye Rural Settlement of Naro-Fominsky District
- Ustye, Odintsovsky District, Moscow Oblast, a village in Yershovskoye Rural Settlement of Odintsovsky District
- Ustye, Ruzsky District, Moscow Oblast, a village in Staroruzskoye Rural Settlement of Ruzsky District

== Nenets Autonomous Okrug ==
- Ustye, Nenets Autonomous Okrug, a village in Telvisochny Selsoviet of Zapolyarny District

== Novgorod Oblast ==
- Ustye, Kholmsky District, Novgorod Oblast, a village in Togodskoye Settlement of Kholmsky District
- Ustye, Lyubytinsky District, Novgorod Oblast, a village under the administrative jurisdiction of the urban-type settlement of Nebolchi, Lyubytinsky District
- Ustye, Malovishersky District, Novgorod Oblast, a village in Verebyinskoye Settlement of Malovishersky District
- Ustye, Pestovsky District, Novgorod Oblast, a village in Ustyutskoye Settlement of Pestovsky District
- Ustye, Poddorsky District, Novgorod Oblast, a village in Poddorskoye Settlement of Poddorsky District
- Ustye, Starorussky District, Novgorod Oblast, a village in Ivanovskoye Settlement of Starorussky District

== Penza Oblast ==
- Ustye, Penza Oblast, a selo in Ustyinsky Selsoviet of Spassky District

== Pskov Oblast ==
- Ustye, Dedovichsky District, Pskov Oblast, a village in Dedovichsky District
- Ustye, Gdovsky District, Pskov Oblast, a village in Gdovsky District
- Ustye, Kunyinsky District, Pskov Oblast, a village in Kunyinsky District
- Ustye (Berezhanskaya Rural Settlement), Ostrovsky District, Pskov Oblast, a village in Ostrovsky District; municipally, a part of Berezhanskaya Rural Settlement of that district
- Ustye (Shikovskaya Rural Settlement), Ostrovsky District, Pskov Oblast, a village in Ostrovsky District; municipally, a part of Shikovskaya Rural Settlement of that district
- Ustye (Yadrovskaya Rural Settlement), Pskovsky District, Pskov Oblast, a village in Pskovsky District; municipally, a part of Yadrovskaya Rural Settlement of that district
- Ustye (Logozovskaya Rural Settlement), Pskovsky District, Pskov Oblast, a village in Pskovsky District; municipally, a part of Logozovskaya Rural Settlement of that district
- Ustye, Pushkinogorsky District, Pskov Oblast, a village in Pushkinogorsky District
- Ustye, Pustoshkinsky District, Pskov Oblast, a village in Pustoshkinsky District

== Ryazan Oblast ==
- Ustye, Ryazan Oblast, a selo in Ustyevsky Rural Okrug of Sasovsky District

== Sakha Republic ==
- Ustye, Sakha Republic, a selo in Ustyinsky Rural Okrug of Suntarsky District

== Smolensk Oblast ==
- Ustye, Dukhovshchinsky District, Smolensk Oblast, a village in Dobrinskoye Rural Settlement of Dukhovshchinsky District
- Ustye, Kholm-Zhirkovsky District, Smolensk Oblast, a village under the administrative jurisdiction of Kholm-Zhirkovskoye Urban Settlement of Kholm-Zhirkovsky District
- Ustye, Sychyovsky District, Smolensk Oblast, a village in Maltsevskoye Rural Settlement of Sychyovsky District
- Ustye, Vyazemsky District, Smolensk Oblast, a village in Yefremovskoye Rural Settlement of Vyazemsky District
- Ustye, Yartsevsky District, Smolensk Oblast, a village in Kapyrevshchinskoye Rural Settlement of Yartsevsky District

== Tambov Oblast ==
- Ustye, Michurinsky District, Tambov Oblast, a selo in Ustyinsky Selsoviet of Michurinsky District
- Ustye, Morshansky District, Tambov Oblast, a selo in Ustyinsky Selsoviet of Morshansky District

== Tula Oblast ==
- Ustye, Tula Oblast, a village in Ustyinsky Rural Okrug of Kimovsky District

== Tver Oblast ==
- Ustye, Bologovsky District, Tver Oblast, a village in Bologovsky District
- Ustye, Kalininsky District, Tver Oblast, a village in Kalininsky District
- Ustye, Kalyazinsky District, Tver Oblast, a village in Kalyazinsky District
- Ustye, Konakovsky District, Tver Oblast, a village in Konakovsky District
- Ustye (settlement), Selizharovsky District, Tver Oblast, a settlement in Selizharovsky District
- Ustye (village), Selizharovsky District, Tver Oblast, a village in Selizharovsky District
- Ustye, Udomelsky District, Tver Oblast, a village in Udomelsky District
- Ustye, Zapadnodvinsky District, Tver Oblast, a village in Zapadnodvinsky District
- Ustye, Zharkovsky District, Tver Oblast, a village in Zharkovsky District
- Ustye, Zubtsovsky District, Tver Oblast, a village in Zubtsovsky District

== Vladimir Oblast ==
- Ustye, Vladimir Oblast, a selo in Sobinsky District

== Vologda Oblast ==
- Ustye, Artyushinsky Selsoviet, Belozersky District, Vologda Oblast, a village in Artyushinsky Selsoviet of Belozersky District
- Ustye, Gorodishchensky Selsoviet, Belozersky District, Vologda Oblast, a village in Gorodishchensky Selsoviet of Belozersky District
- Ustye, Kirillovsky District, Vologda Oblast, a village in Ferapontovsky Selsoviet of Kirillovsky District
- Ustye, Totemsky District, Vologda Oblast, a village in Ust-Pechengsky Selsoviet of Totemsky District
- Ustye, Ust-Kubinsky District, Vologda Oblast, a selo in Ustyansky Selsoviet of Ust-Kubinsky District
- Ustye, Vashkinsky District, Vologda Oblast, a village in Vasilyevsky Selsoviet of Vashkinsky District
- Ustye, Vytegorsky District, Vologda Oblast, a village in Tudozersky Selsoviet of Vytegorsky District

== Voronezh Oblast ==
- Ustye, Khokholsky District, Voronezh Oblast, a selo in Petinskoye Rural Settlement of Khokholsky District
- Ustye, Semiluksky District, Voronezh Oblast, a khutor in Starovedugskoye Rural Settlement of Semiluksky District

== Yaroslavl Oblast ==
- Ustye, Bolsheselsky District, Yaroslavl Oblast, a village in Novoselsky Rural Okrug of Bolsheselsky District
- Ustye, Yaroslavsky District, Yaroslavl Oblast, a selo in Ryutnevsky Rural Okrug of Yaroslavsky District
- Ustye (river), a tributary of the Kotorosl

== Zabaykalsky Krai ==
- Ustye, Zabaykalsky Krai, a selo in Kyrinsky District

== See also ==
- Ustya (disambiguation)
