= Komsomol, Russia =

Komsomol Комсомол
- Selo
- Interactive map of Komsomol
- Location of Komsomol Komsomol (Sakha Republic)
- Coordinates: 62°54′15″N 117°37′21″E
- Country: Russia
- Federal subject: Sakha Republic
- Administrative district: Suntarsky District
- Rural okrugSelsoviet: Sheinsky Rural Okrug

Population
  - Estimate (2002): 14 )

Municipal status
  - Municipal district: Suntarsky Municipal District
  - Rural settlement: Sheinsky Rural Settlement
- Time zone: UTC+
- Postal code: 678290
- OKTMO ID: 98648470106

Komsomol (Russian: Комсомол) is a rural locality (a selo), one of three settlements, in addition to Sheya, the administrative centre of the Rural Okrug, and Byas-Sheya in Sheinsky Rural Okrug of Suntarsky District in the Sakha Republic, Russia. It is located 112 kilometers (70 mi) from Suntar, the administrative center of the district and 7 kilometers (4.3 mi) from Sheya. Its population as of the 2002 Census was 14.
