= Bylyra =

Bylyra Былыра
- Selo
- Location within Zabaykalsky Krai Location within Russia
- Coordinates: 49°41′N 111°43′E
- Country: Russia
- Region: Zabaykalsky Krai
- District: Kyrinsky District
- Time zone: UTC+9:00

Bylyra (Russian: Былыра) is a rural locality (a selo) in Kyrinsky District, Zabaykalsky Krai, Russia. Population: 231 (2021 census); 239 (2010 census); There are 3 streets in this selo.

== Geography ==
This rural locality is located 22 km from Kyra (the district's administrative centre), 290 km from Chita (capital of Zabaykalsky Krai) and 5,373 km from Moscow. Bilyutuy is the nearest rural locality.
