= Tokhtor =

Tokhtor Тохтор
- Selo
- Location within Zabaykalsky Krai Location within Russia
- Coordinates: 50°04′N 113°21′E
- Country: Russia
- Region: Zabaykalsky Krai
- District: Akshinsky District
- Time zone: UTC+9:00

Tokhtor (Russian: Тохтор) is a rural locality (a selo) in Akshinsky District, Zabaykalsky Krai, Russia. Population: 257 (2021 census); 371 (2010 census); 414 (2002 census); There are 5 streets in this selo.

== Geography ==
This rural locality is located 23 km from Aksha (the district's administrative centre), 218 km from Chita (capital of Zabaykalsky Krai) and 5,441 km from Moscow. Bytev is the nearest rural locality.
