= Arylakh =

Arylakh (Russian: Арылах) is the name of several rural localities in the Sakha Republic, Russia:

- Arylakh, Churapchinsky District, Sakha Republic, a selo in Arylakhsky Rural Okrug of Churapchinsky District
- Arylakh, Kobyaysky District, Sakha Republic, a selo in Lyuchcheginsky 1-y Rural Okrug of Kobyaysky District
- Arylakh, Mirninsky District, Sakha Republic, a selo in Chuoninsky Rural Okrug of Mirninsky District
- Arylakh, Suntarsky District, Sakha Republic, a selo in Tyubyay-Zharkhansky Rural Okrug of Suntarsky District
- Arylakh, Ust-Aldansky District, Sakha Republic, a selo in Oltekhsky Rural Okrug of Ust-Aldansky District
- Arylakh, Vilyuysky District, Sakha Republic, a selo in Bappagayinsky Rural Okrug of Vilyuysky District

== See also ==
- Arylakh (Zharkhan), a selo in Zharkhansky Rural Okrug of Suntarsky District in the Sakha Republic
