= Tarbaldzhey =

Tarbaldzhey Тарбальджей
- Selo
- Location within Zabaykalsky Krai Location within Russia
- Coordinates: 49°44′N 112°30′E
- Country: Russia
- Region: Zabaykalsky Krai
- District: Kyrinsky District
- Time zone: UTC+9:00

Tarbaldzhey (Russian: Тарбальджей) is a rural locality (a selo) in Kyrinsky District, Zabaykalsky Krai, Russia. Population: 330 (2021 census); 414 (2010 census); 453 (2002 census); There are 4 streets in this selo.

== Geography ==
This rural locality is located 43 km from Kyra (the district's administrative centre), 265 km from Chita (capital of Zabaykalsky Krai) and 5,424 km from Moscow. Nizhny Stan is the nearest rural locality.
