= Kurulga =

Kurulga Курулга
- Selo
- Location within Zabaykalsky Krai Location within Russia
- Coordinates: 50°07′N 112°45′E
- Country: Russia
- Region: Zabaykalsky Krai
- District: Akshinsky District
- Time zone: UTC+9:00

Kurulga (Russian: Курулга) is a rural locality (a selo) in Akshinsky District, Zabaykalsky Krai, Russia. Population: 367 (2021 census); 383 (2010 census); 370 (2002 census); There are 5 streets in this selo.

== Geography ==
This rural locality is located 42 km from Aksha (the district's administrative centre), 219 km from Chita (capital of Zabaykalsky Krai) and 5,395 km from Moscow. Narasun is the nearest rural locality.
