= Turgen, Russia =

Turgen Турген
- Selo
- Location within Zabaykalsky Krai Location within Russia
- Coordinates: 49°45′N 113°08′E
- Country: Russia
- Region: Zabaykalsky Krai
- District: Kyrinsky District
- Time zone: UTC+9:00

Turgen (Russian: Турген) is a rural locality (a selo) in Kyrinsky District, Zabaykalsky Krai, Russia. Population: 138 (2010 census); 190 (2002 census); There are 3 streets in this selo.

== Geography ==
This rural locality is located 86 km from Kyra (the district's administrative centre), 255 km from Chita (capital of Zabaykalsky Krai) and 5,446 km from Moscow. Mikhaylo-Pavlovsk is the nearest rural locality.
