= Semyon Nomokonov =

Soviet sniper during World War II

- Семён Данилович Номоконов
- Born: 12 August 1900; Delyun, Russia
- Died: 15 July 1973 (aged 72); Zugalay, Soviet Union
- Military career
- Allegiance: Soviet Union
- Service years: 1941–1945
- Rank: Sergeant
- Nickname: Taiga Shaman
- Unit: 221st Rifle Division
- Conflicts: World War II; Eastern Front; Siege of Leningrad; Battle of the Dnieper; Courland Pocket; East Prussian offensive; Soviet invasion of Manchuria
- Awards: Order of Lenin

Semyon Danilovich Nomokonov (Russian: Семён Данилович Номоконов; 12 August 1900 – 15 July 1973) was a Soviet sniper during World War II credited with 367 kills, thus being considered as one of the deadliest snipers in history. (Note: 360 German soldiers and 7 Japanese soldiers according to the sniper log. According to other sources, 368 or 369 kills. The figure 368 includes eight Japanese killed on the Transbaikal Front.) An ethnic Hamnigan Evenk, (Note: More generally described as a Hamnigan Tungusic.) Nomokonov was among the indigenous peoples of Russia, who fought in the war. He received the nickname "Taiga Shaman" from enemies.

== Early life ==
Nomokonov was born in the settlement of Delyun, Russia, to a poor family of hunters, and from childhood lived in the taiga. Nomokonov first used a rifle at the age of seven. He hunted sable, Manchurian wapiti, and elk, and was nicknamed "eye of the kite". Nomokonov was baptised at the age of 15, and received the name Semyon. In 1928, Nomokonov moved to the settlement of Nizhny Stan. Here he continued hunting, and also practised carpentry.

== World War II ==
Nomokonov started his military service in August 1941, initially in a subsistence farm of a regiment. Then he made crutches for the wounded. Nomokonov became a sniper by chance. In autumn of 1941, he was evacuating one of the wounded, when he noticed a German, aiming at him. Nomokonov killed him with his own rifle. According to another version, in October 1941, Nomokonov received a rifle and decided to test it. To avoid wasting the rounds, Nomokonov tested the rifle on a German, who was moving along the wooded lake shore, bending down. After that, Nomokonov was transferred to a sniper platoon. He started shooting with a Mosin–Nagant rifle without a telescopic sight. Nomokonov fought at the Valdai Heights, Karelian Isthmus, Ukraine, Lithuania, East Prussia, and then in Manchuria. He initially marked the number of kills on his smoking pipe. Nomokonov was wounded eight times and suffered a blast injury twice.

As a sniper instructor, Nomokonov trained over 150 soldiers.

== Post-war life ==
Nomokonov returned home on a horse. In the autumn of 1945, Nomokonov received a horse, binoculars, and a personalized sniper rifle no. 24638 for his military service. He continued practising carpentry in Nizhny Stan, but then moved to the settlement of Zugalay, where his elder sons were living. He built a house and continued hunting during his free time. According to Nomokonov's daughter, Zoya Babuyeva, he was a taciturn person and did not like to talk much about the war.

Nomokonov died in Zugalay and was interred there. Nomokonov left 9 children and 49 grandchildren.

== Awards ==
- Order of Lenin
- Order of the Red Banner
- Two Order of the Red Star
- Medal "For Battle Merit"

== Popular culture ==
Poet Vasily Lebedev-Kumach dedicated a poem to him.

The 2012 Russian television film Sniper 2: Tungus is loosely based on the exploits of Nomokonov during the war. The main protagonist of the film, Mikhail Kononov, played by Kazakh actor Tolepbergen Baisakalov, is nicknamed "Tungus" in reference to Nomokonov's ethnic background as a Hamnigan Evenki, a northern branch of Tungusic people.

== See also ==
- Soviet snipers
