= Shumunda =

Shumunda Шумунда
- Selo
- Location within Zabaykalsky Krai Location within Russia
- Coordinates: 49°29′N 111°17′E
- Country: Russia
- Region: Zabaykalsky Krai
- District: Kyrinsky District
- Time zone: UTC+9:00

Shumunda (Russian: Шумунда) is a rural locality (a selo) in Kyrinsky District, Zabaykalsky Krai, Russia. Population: 132 (2021 census); 166 (2010 census); 193 (2002 census); There are 4 streets in this selo.

== Geography ==
This rural locality is located 50 km from Kyra (the district's administrative centre), 324 km from Chita (capital of Zabaykalsky Krai) and 5,366 km from Moscow. Bukukun is the nearest rural locality.
