= Ygyatta, Sakha Republic =

Ygyatta Ыгыатта
- Selo

Other transcription(s)
  - Yakut: Ыгыатта
- Interactive map of Ygyatta
- Location of Ygyatta Ygyatta (Sakha Republic)
- Coordinates: 62°58′28″N 117°29′15″E
- Country: Russia
- Federal subject: Sakha Republic
- Administrative district: Suntarsky District
- Rural okrugSelsoviet: Tyubyay-Zharkhansky Rural Okrug

Population (2010 Census)
  - Total: 34
  - Estimate (2021): 25 (−26.5%)

Municipal status
  - Municipal district: Suntarsky Municipal District
  - Rural settlement: Tyubyay-Zharkhansky Rural Settlement
- Time zone: UTC+
- Postal code: 678277
- OKTMO ID: 98648462111

Ygyatta (Russian: Ыгыатта; Yakut: Ыгыатта, Igıatta) is a rural locality (a selo) in Tyubyay-Zharkhansky Rural Okrug of Suntarsky District in the Sakha Republic, Russia, located 115 kilometers (71 mi) from Suntar, the administrative center of the district, and 3 kilometers (1.9 mi) from Arylakh, the administrative center of the rural okrug. Its population as of the 2010 Census was 34; down from 74 recorded in the 2002 Census.
