= Oroy =

Oroy Орой
- Selo
- Location within Zabaykalsky Krai Location within Russia
- Coordinates: 50°10′N 113°44′E
- Country: Russia
- Region: Zabaykalsky Krai
- District: Akshinsky District
- Time zone: UTC+9:00

Oroy (Russian: Орой) is a rural locality (a selo) in Akshinsky District, Zabaykalsky Krai, Russia. Population: 320 (2021 census); 429 (2010 census); 465 (2002 census); There are 6 streets in this selo.

== Geography ==
This rural locality is located 35 km from Aksha (the district's administrative centre), 208 km from Chita (capital of Zabaykalsky Krai) and 5,457 km from Moscow. Ubur-Tokhtor is the nearest rural locality.
