= Ubur-Tokhtor =

Ubur-Tokhtor Убур-Тохтор
- Selo
- Location within Zabaykalsky Krai Location within Russia
- Coordinates: 50°06′N 113°37′E
- Country: Russia
- Region: Zabaykalsky Krai
- District: Akshinsky District
- Time zone: UTC+9:00

Ubur-Tokhtor (Russian: Убур-Тохтор) is a rural locality (a selo) in Akshinsky District, Zabaykalsky Krai, Russia. Population: 145 (2021 census); 229 (2010 census); 325 (2002 census); There are 4 streets in this selo.

== Geography ==
This rural locality is located 31 km from Aksha (the district's administrative centre), 215 km from Chita (capital of Zabaykalsky Krai) and 5,457 km from Moscow. Oroy is the nearest rural locality.
