= Mangut, Zabaykalsky Krai =

Mangut Мангут
- Selo
- Location within Zabaykalsky Krai Location within Russia
- Coordinates: 49°41′N 112°40′E
- Country: Russia
- Region: Zabaykalsky Krai
- District: Kyrinsky District
- Time zone: UTC+9:00

Mangut (Russian: Мангут) is a rural locality (a selo) in Kyrinsky District, Zabaykalsky Krai, Russia. Population: 1,888 (2021 census); 2,169 (2010 census); 2,286 (2002 census); There are 19 streets in this selo.

== Geography ==
This rural locality is located 53 km from Kyra (the district's administrative centre), 266 km from Chita (capital of Zabaykalsky Krai) and 5,440 km from Moscow. Tarbaldzhey is the nearest rural locality.
