= Ulkhun-Partiya =

Ulkhun-Partiya Ульхун-Партия
- Selo
- Location within Zabaykalsky Krai Location within Russia
- Coordinates: 49°51′N 112°45′E
- Country: Russia
- Region: Zabaykalsky Krai
- District: Kyrinsky District
- Time zone: UTC+9:00

Ulkhun-Partiya (Russian: Ульхун-Партия) is a rural locality (a selo) in Kyrinsky District, Zabaykalsky Krai, Russia. Population: 612 (2010 census); 738 (2002 census); There are 9 streets in this selo.

== Geography ==
This rural locality is located 65 km from Kyra (the district's administrative centre), 248 km from Chita (capital of Zabaykalsky Krai) and 5,427 km from Moscow. Mangut is the nearest rural locality.
