= Neryuktyay =

Neryuktyay Нерюктяй
- Selo
- Interactive map of Neryuktyay
- Location of Neryuktyay Neryuktyay (Sakha Republic)
- Coordinates: 62°48′N 117°25′E
- Country: Russia
- Federal subject: Sakha Republic
- Administrative district: Suntarsky District
- Rural okrugSelsoviet: Tyubyaysky Rural Okrug

Population
  - Estimate (2002): 9 )

Municipal status
  - Municipal district: Suntarsky Municipal District
  - Rural settlement: Tyubyaysky Rural Settlement
- Time zone: UTC+
- Postal code: 678276
- OKTMO ID: 98648463106

Neryuktyay (Russian: Нерюктяй; Yakut: Нөөрүктээйи, Nöörükteeyi) is a rural locality (a selo) in Tyubyaysky Rural Okrug of Suntarsky District in the Sakha Republic, Russia, located 97 kilometers (60 mi) from Suntar, the administrative center of the district and 2 kilometers (1.2 mi) from Tyubyay, the administrative center of the rural okrug. Its population as of the 2002 Census was 9.
