= Lubov, Zabaykalsky Krai =

Lubov Любовь
- Selo
- Location within Zabaykalsky Krai Location within Russia
- Coordinates: 49°38′N 112°09′E
- Country: Russia
- Region: Zabaykalsky Krai
- District: Kyrinsky District
- Time zone: UTC+9:00

Lubov (Russian: Любовь) is a rural locality (a selo) in Kyrinsky District, Zabaykalsky Krai, Russia. Population: 507 (2021 census); 737 (2010 census); 951 (2002 census); There are 16 streets in this selo.

== Geography ==
This rural locality is located 15 km from Kyra (the district's administrative centre), 283 km from Chita (capital of Zabaykalsky Krai) and 5,410 km from Moscow. Mordoy is the nearest rural locality.
