= Ust-Ilya =

Ust-Ilya Усть-Иля
- Selo
- Location within Zabaykalsky Krai Location within Russia
- Coordinates: 50°24′N 113°42′E
- Country: Russia
- Region: Zabaykalsky Krai
- District: Akshinsky District
- Time zone: UTC+9:00

Ust-Ilya (Russian: Усть-Иля) is a rural locality (a selo) in Akshinsky District, Zabaykalsky Krai, Russia. Population: 374 (2021 census); 551 (2010 census); 696 (2002 census); There are 8 streets in this selo.

== Geography ==
This rural locality is located 33 km from Aksha (the district's administrative centre), 182 km from Chita (capital of Zabaykalsky Krai) and 5,426 km from Moscow. Mogoytuy is the nearest rural locality.
