= Suntar =

Suntar may refer to:

- Suntar (rural locality), a rural locality (a selo) in Suntarsky District of the Sakha Republic, Russia
- Suntar Airport, an airport there
