= Ureysk =

Ureysk Урейск
- Selo
- Location within Zabaykalsky Krai Location within Russia
- Coordinates: 50°17′N 113°12′E
- Country: Russia
- Region: Zabaykalsky Krai
- District: Akshinsky District
- Time zone: UTC+9:00

Ureysk (Russian: Урейск) is a rural locality (a selo) in Akshinsky District, Zabaykalsky Krai, Russia. Population: 816 (2021 census); 995 (2010 census); 1,161 (2002 census); There are 13 streets in this selo.

== Geography ==
This rural locality is located 5 km from Aksha (the district's administrative centre), 194 km from Chita (capital of Zabaykalsky Krai) and 5,404 km from Moscow. Aksha is the nearest rural locality.
