= Milyake =

Milyake Миляке
- Selo
- Interactive map of Milyake
- Location of Milyake Milyake (Sakha Republic)
- Coordinates: 63°03′N 116°25′E
- Country: Russia
- Federal subject: Sakha Republic
- Administrative district: Suntarsky District
- Rural okrugSelsoviet: Tyubyay-Zharkhansky Rural Okrug
- Elevation: 156 m (512 ft)

Population
  - Estimate (2002): 3 )

Municipal status
  - Municipal district: Suntarsky Municipal District
  - Rural settlement: Tyubyay-Zharkhansky Rural Settlement
- Time zone: UTC+
- Postal code: 678277
- OKTMO ID: 98648462106

Milyake (Russian: Миляке; Yakut: Мэлэкэ, Meleke) is a rural locality (a selo) in Tyubyay-Zharkhansky Rural Okrug of Suntarsky District in the Sakha Republic, Russia, located 190 kilometers (120 mi) from Suntar, the administrative center of the district and 78 kilometers (48 mi) from Arylakh, the administrative center of the rural okrug. Its population as of the 2002 Census was 3.
