= Takecha =

Takecha Такеча
- Selo
- Location within Zabaykalsky Krai Location within Russia
- Coordinates: 50°28′N 113°17′E
- Country: Russia
- Region: Zabaykalsky Krai
- District: Akshinsky District
- Time zone: UTC+9:00

Takecha (Russian: Такеча) is a rural locality (a selo) in Akshinsky District, Zabaykalsky Krai, Russia. Population: 165 (2021 census); 199 (2010 census); 247 (2002 census); There are 4 streets in this selo.

== Geography ==
This rural locality is located 21 km from Aksha (the district's administrative centre), 175 km from Chita (capital of Zabaykalsky Krai) and 5,388 km from Moscow. Ulacha is the nearest rural locality.
