= Novokazachinsk =

Novokazachinsk Новоказачинск
- Selo
- Location within Zabaykalsky Krai Location within Russia
- Coordinates: 50°24′N 113°32′E
- Country: Russia
- Region: Zabaykalsky Krai
- District: Akshinsky District
- Time zone: UTC+9:00

Novokazachinsk (Russian: Новоказачинск) is a rural locality (a selo) in Akshinsky District, Zabaykalsky Krai, Russia. Population: 122 (2021 census); 147 (2010 census); 182 (2002 census); There is 1 street in this selo.

== Geography ==
This rural locality is located 23 km from Aksha (the district's administrative centre), 181 km from Chita (capital of Zabaykalsky Krai) and 5,413 km from Moscow. Novokurgatay is the nearest rural locality.
