= Mogoytuy, Akshinsky District, Zabaykalsky Krai =

Mogoytuy Могойтуй
- Selo
- Location within Zabaykalsky Krai Location within Russia
- Coordinates: 50°21′N 113°50′E
- Country: Russia
- Region: Zabaykalsky Krai
- District: Akshinsky District
- Time zone: UTC+9:00

Mogoytuy (Russian: Могойтуй) is a rural locality (a selo) in Akshinsky District, Zabaykalsky Krai, Russia. Population: 637 (2021 census); 844 (2010 census); 1,006 (2002 census); There are 9 streets in this selo.

== Geography ==
This rural locality is located 40 km from Aksha (the district's administrative centre), 189 km from Chita (capital of Zabaykalsky Krai) and 5,441 km from Moscow. Ust-Ilya is the nearest rural locality.
