= Khapcheranga =

Khapcheranga Хапчеранга
- Selo
- Location within Zabaykalsky Krai Location within Russia
- Coordinates: 49°00′N 111°00′E
- Country: Russia
- Region: Zabaykalsky Krai
- District: Kyrinsky District
- Time zone: UTC+9:00

Khapcheranga (Russian: Хапчеранга) is a rural locality (a selo) in Kyrinsky District, Zabaykalsky Krai, Russia. Population: 652 (2021 census); 839 (2010 census); 1,082 (2002 census); There are 33 streets in this selo.

== Geography ==
This rural locality is located 33 km from Kyra (the district's administrative centre), 271 km from Chita (capital of Zabaykalsky Krai) and 5,419 km from Moscow. Novy Kurultyken is the nearest rural locality.
