= Tyrin =

Tyrin Тырин
- Selo
- Location within Zabaykalsky Krai Location within Russia
- Coordinates: 49°33′N 112°23′E
- Country: Russia
- Region: Zabaykalsky Krai
- District: Kyrinsky District
- Time zone: UTC+9:00

Tyrin (Russian: Тырин) is a rural locality (a selo) in Kyrinsky District, Zabaykalsky Krai, Russia. Population: 255 (2010 census); 347 (2002 census); There are 4 streets in this selo.

== Geography ==
This rural locality is located 31 km from Kyra (the district's administrative centre), 286 km from Chita (capital of Zabaykalsky Krai) and 5,437 km from Moscow. Verkhny Ulkhun is the nearest rural locality.
