= Verkhny Stan =

Verkhny Stan Верхний Стан
- Selo
- Location within Zabaykalsky Krai Location within Russia
- Coordinates: 49°46′N 112°28′Ehttps://mapdata.ru/zabaykalskiy-kray/kirinskiy-rayon/selo-verhniy-stan/
- Country: Russia
- Region: Zabaykalsky Krai
- District: Kyrinsky District
- Time zone: UTC+9:00

Verkhny Stan (Russian: Верхний Стан) is a rural locality (a selo) in Kyrinsky District, Zabaykalsky Krai, Russia. Population: 5 (2021 census); 7 (2010 census);

== Geography ==
This rural locality is located 42 km from Kyra (the district's administrative centre), 262 km from Chita (capital of Zabaykalsky Krai) and 5,417 km from Moscow. Nizhny Stan is the nearest rural locality.
