= Altan, Zabaykalsky Krai =

Altan Алтан
- Selo
- Location within Zabaykalsky Krai Location within Russia
- Coordinates: 49°30′N 111°32′E
- Country: Russia
- Region: Zabaykalsky Krai
- District: Kyrinsky District
- Time zone: UTC+9:00

Altan (Russian: Алтан) is a rural locality (a selo) in Kyrinsky District, Zabaykalsky Krai, Russia. Population: 525 (2021 census); 725 (2010 census); There are 7 streets in this selo.

== Geography ==
This rural locality is located 33 km from Kyra (the district's administrative centre), 314 km from Chita (capital of Zabaykalsky Krai) and 5,382 km from Moscow. Bilyutuy is the nearest rural locality.
