= Krestyakh =

Krestyakh Крестях
- Selo

Other transcription(s)
  - Yakut: Кириэстээх
- Interactive map of Krestyakh
- Location of Krestyakh Krestyakh (Sakha Republic)
- Coordinates: 62°15′06″N 116°10′28″E
- Country: Russia
- Federal subject: Sakha Republic
- Administrative district: Suntarsky District
- Rural okrugSelsoviet: Krestyakhsky Rural Okrug
- Founded: 1873

Population (2010 Census)
  - Total: 882
  - Estimate (2021): 794 (−10%)

Administrative status
  - Capital of: Krestyakhsky Rural Okrug

Municipal status
  - Municipal district: Suntarsky Municipal District
  - Rural settlement: Krestyakhsky Rural Settlement
  - Capital of: Krestyakhsky Rural Settlement
- Time zone: UTC+
- Postal code: 678283
- OKTMO ID: 98648430101

Krestyakh (Russian: Крестях; Yakut: Кириэстээх, romanized: Kiriesteex) is a rural locality (a selo), the only inhabited locality, and the administrative center of Krestyakhsky Rural Okrug of Suntarsky District in the Sakha Republic, Russia, located 93 kilometers (58 mi) from Suntar, the administrative center of the district. Its population as of the 2010 Census was 882, down from 1,098 recorded during the 2002 Census.
