= Elgyan =

Elgyan Эльгян
- Selo
- Interactive map of Elgyan
- Location of Elgyan Elgyan (Sakha Republic)
- Coordinates: 62°24′09″N 117°32′17″E
- Country: Russia
- Federal subject: Sakha Republic
- Administrative district: Suntarsky District
- Rural okrugSelsoviet: Kyundyayinsky Rural Okrug

Population
  - Estimate (2002): 13 )

Municipal status
  - Municipal district: Suntarsky Municipal District
  - Rural settlement: Kyundyayinsky Rural Settlement
- Time zone: UTC+
- Postal code: 678274
- OKTMO ID: 98648445106

Elgyan (Russian: Эльгян; Yakut: Элгээн, Elgeen) is a rural locality (a selo), one of three settlements, in addition to Kyundyae, the administrative centre of the Rural Okrug, and Kharyalakh in Vilyuchansky Rural Okrug of Suntarsky District in the Sakha Republic, Russia. It is located 37 kilometers (23 mi) from Suntar, the administrative center of the district and 13 kilometers (8.1 mi) from Khordogoy. Its population as of the 2002 Census was 13.
