= Toybokhoy =

Toybokhoy Тойбохой
- Selo
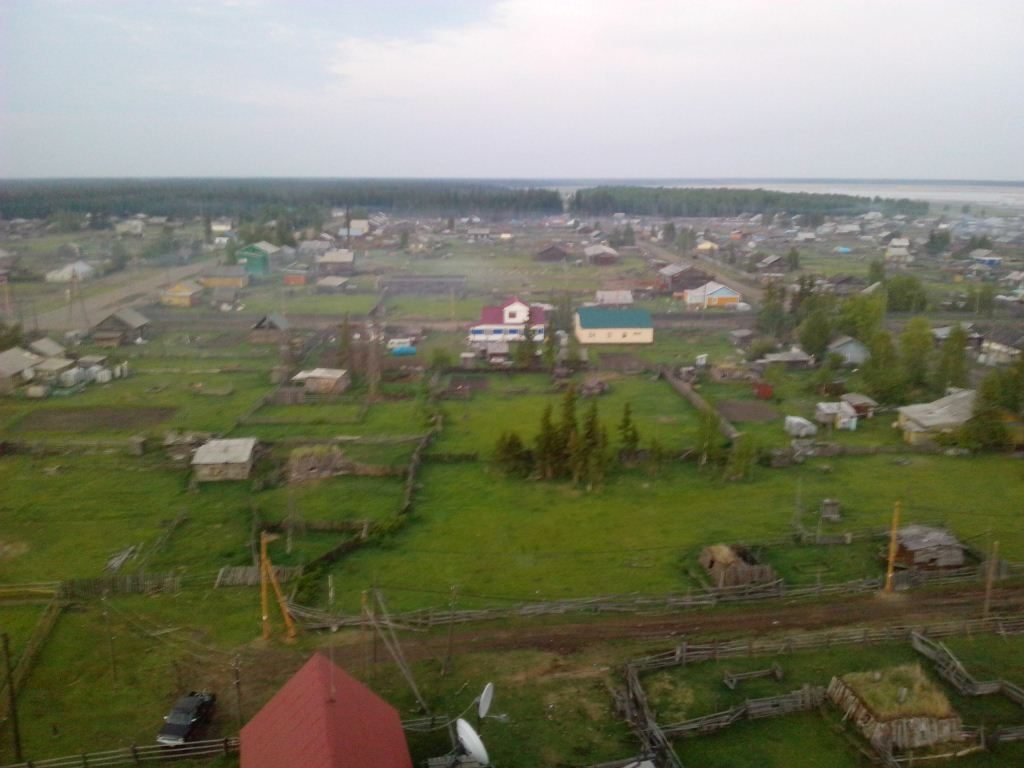
- Aerial view of Toybokhoy
- Interactive map of Toybokhoy
- Location of Toybokhoy Toybokhoy (Sakha Republic)
- Coordinates: 62°11′N 116°46′E
- Country: Russia
- Federal subject: Sakha Republic
- Administrative district: Suntarsky District
- Rural okrugSelsoviet: Toybokhoysky Rural Okrug

Population (2010 Census)
  - Total: 1,600
  - Estimate (2021): 1,426 (−10.9%)

Administrative status
  - Capital of: Toybokhoysky Rural Okrug

Municipal status
  - Municipal district: Suntarsky Municipal District
  - Rural settlement: Toybokhoysky Rural Settlement
  - Capital of: Toybokhoysky Rural Settlement
- Time zone: UTC+
- Postal code: 678282
- OKTMO ID: 98648460101

Toybokhoy (Russian: Тойбохой; Yakut: Тойбохой, Toyboxoy) is a rural locality (a selo), the only inhabited locality, and the administrative center of Toybokhoysky Rural Okrug of Suntarsky District in the Sakha Republic, Russia, located 56 kilometers (35 mi) from Suntar, the administrative center of the district. Its population as of the 2010 Census was 1,600, down from 1,703 recorded during the 2002 Census.
