= Kutana, Suntarsky District, Sakha Republic =

Kutana Кутана
- Selo
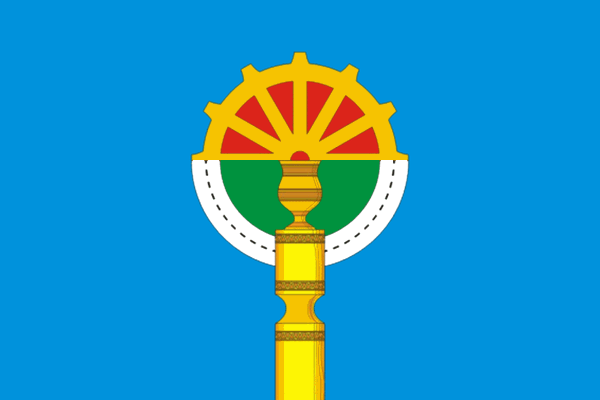
- Flag
- Interactive map of Kutana
- Location of Kutana Kutana (Sakha Republic)
- Coordinates: 62°42′49″N 117°35′02″E
- Country: Russia
- Federal subject: Sakha Republic
- Administrative district: Suntarsky District
- Rural okrugSelsoviet: Kutaninsky Rural Okrug

Population
  - Estimate (2002): 939 )

Administrative status
  - Capital of: Kutaninsky Rural Okrug

Municipal status
  - Municipal district: Suntarsky Municipal District
  - Rural settlement: Kutaninsky Rural Settlement
  - Capital of: Kutaninsky Rural Settlement
- Time zone: UTC+
- Postal code: 678275
- OKTMO ID: 98648440101

Kutana (Russian: Кутана; Yakut: Кутана) is a rural locality (a selo), the administrative centre of and one of two settlements, in addition to Tumul, in Kutaninsky Rural Okrug of Suntarsky District in the Sakha Republic, Russia. It is located 79 kilometers (49 mi) from Suntar, the administrative center of the district. Its population as of the 2002 Census was 939.
