= Kempendyay (river) =

River in Yakutia, Russia

Kempendyay Кемпендяй / Кэмпэндээйи
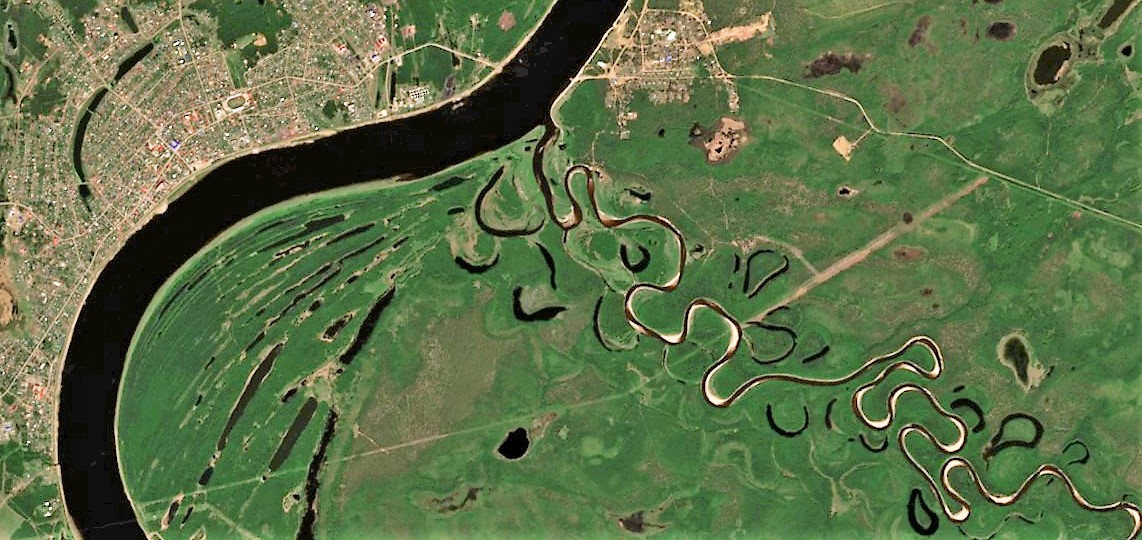
- Mouth of the Kempendyay in the Vilyuy Sentinel-2 image

- Mouth location in Yakutia, Russia

Location
- Country: Yakutia, Russia

Physical characteristics
- Source
  - location: Lena Plateau
  - coordinates: 62°18′14″N 119°53′14″E
- Mouth: Vilyuy
  - location: near Ustye
  - coordinates: 62°09′34″N 117°42′47″E
  - elevation: 118 m (387 ft)
- Length: 266 km (165 mi)
- Basin size: 3,100 km^{2} (1,200 sq mi)
- Discharge
  - average: 2.5 m^{3}/s (88 cu ft/s) near Kempendyay village

Basin features
- Progression: Vilyuy→ Lena→ Laptev Sea

The Kempendyay (Russian: Кемпендяй; Yakut: Кэмпэндээйи) is a river in Yakutia (Sakha Republic), Russia. It is a right hand tributary of the Vilyuy, with a length of 266 kilometres (165 mi) and a drainage basin area of 3,100 square kilometres (1,200 mi^{2}).

The river flows across the mostly uninhabited territory of Suntarsky District. Kempendyay village is located in its middle course. Ustye village lies near its confluence with the Vilyuy, and Suntar, the administrative center of the district, lies a little to the west on the facing bank. There are deposits of rock salt in the Kempendyay basin, as well as a mud bath resort.

== Course ==
The Kempendyay begins in the Lena Plateau and flows within it along its course. It heads first roughly southwestwards and in its last stretch, shortly after Kempendyay village, it bends and heads northwestwards strongly meandering within a floodplain among oxbow lakes. Finally the river joins the right bank of the Vilyuy 737 kilometres (458 mi) from its mouth. The Kempendyay freezes between the second half of October and late May.

The largest tributary of the Kempendyay is the 47 kilometres (29 mi) long Ulakhan-Karyalaakh that joins it from the right.

== See also ==
- List of rivers of Russia
