= Tolon, Khadansky Rural Okrug, Suntarsky District, Sakha Republic =

Tolon Толон
- Selo
- Interactive map of Tolon
- Location of Tolon Tolon (Sakha Republic)
- Coordinates: 62°00′31″N 117°29′23″E
- Country: Russia
- Federal subject: Sakha Republic
- Administrative district: Suntarsky District
- Rural okrugSelsoviet: Khadansky Rural Okrug

Population (2010 Census)
  - Total: 0
  - Estimate (2021): 0 )

Municipal status
  - Municipal district: Suntarsky Municipal District
  - Rural settlement: Khadansky Rural Settlement
- Postal code: 678274

Tolon (Russian: Толон; Yakut: Толоон, Toloon) is a rural locality (a selo) in Khadansky Rural Okrug of Suntarsky District in the Sakha Republic, Russia, located 26 kilometers (16 mi) from Suntar, the administrative center of the district, and 1 kilometer (0.62 mi) from Agdary, the administrative center of the rural okrug. It had no recorded population as of the 2010 Census and the 2002 Census.
