= Agdary =

Agdary Агдары
- Selo
- Interactive map of Agdary
- Location of Agdary Agdary (Sakha Republic)
- Coordinates: 61°59′59″N 117°28′41″E
- Country: Russia
- Federal subject: Sakha Republic
- Administrative district: Suntarsky District
- Rural okrugSelsoviet: Khadansky Rural Okrug
- Elevation: 148 m (486 ft)

Population
  - Estimate (2002): 478 )

Administrative status
  - Capital of: Khadansky Rural Okrug

Municipal status
  - Municipal district: Suntarsky Municipal District
  - Rural settlement: Khadansky Rural Settlement
  - Capital of: Khadansky Rural Settlement
- Time zone: UTC+
- Postal code: 678271
- OKTMO ID: 98648465101

Agdary (Russian: Агдары; Yakut: Агдаары, Agdaarı) is a rural locality (a selo), the administrative centre of and one of three settlements, in addition to Tolon and Eyikyar, in Khadansky Rural Okrug of Suntarsky District in the Sakha Republic, Russia. It is located 25 kilometers (16 mi) from Suntar, the administrative center of the district. Its population as of the 2002 Census was 478.
