= Khordogoy =

Khordogoy Хордогой
- Selo
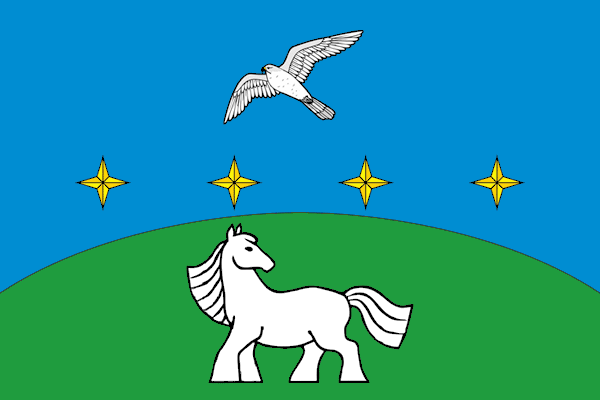
- Flag
- Interactive map of Khordogoy
- Location of Khordogoy Khordogoy (Sakha Republic)
- Coordinates: 62°36′04″N 115°41′21″E
- Country: Russia
- Federal subject: Sakha Republic
- Administrative district: Suntarsky District
- Rural okrugSelsoviet: Vilyuchansky Rural Okrug
- Elevation: 157 m (515 ft)

Population
  - Estimate (2002): 819 )

Administrative status
  - Capital of: Vilyuchansky Rural Okrug

Municipal status
  - Municipal district: Suntarsky Municipal District
  - Rural settlement: Vilyuchansky Rural Settlement
  - Capital of: Vilyuchansky Rural Settlement
- Time zone: UTC+
- Postal code: 678284
- OKTMO ID: 98648415101

Khordogoy (Russian: Хордогой; Yakut: Хордоҕой, Xordoğoy) is a rural locality (a selo), the administrative centre of and one of two settlements, in addition to Oyusut, in Vilyuchansky Rural Okrug of Suntarsky District in the Sakha Republic, Russia. Located 158 kilometers (98 mi) from Suntar, it is the administrative center of the district. Khordogoy's population as of the 2002 Census was 819.
