= Nakhara =

Nakhara Нахара
- Selo
- Interactive map of Nakhara
- Location of Nakhara Nakhara (Sakha Republic)
- Coordinates: 62°27′38.29″N 115°43′20.49″E
- Country: Russia
- Federal subject: Sakha Republic
- Administrative district: Suntarsky District
- Rural okrugSelsoviet: Nakharinsky Rural Okrug

Population (2010 Census)
  - Total: 113
  - Estimate (2021): 110 (−2.7%)

Administrative status
  - Capital of: Nakharinsky Rural Okrug

Municipal status
  - Municipal district: Suntarsky Municipal District
  - Rural settlement: Nakharinsky Rural Settlement
  - Capital of: Nakharinsky Rural Settlement
- Time zone: UTC+
- Postal code: 678284
- OKTMO ID: 98648452101

Nakhara (Russian: Нахара; Yakut: Наахара, Naaxara) is a rural locality (a selo), the only inhabited locality, and the administrative center of Nakharinsky Rural Okrug of Suntarsky District in the Sakha Republic, Russia, located 140 kilometers (87 mi) from Suntar, the administrative center of the district. Its population as of the 2010 Census was 113, down from 123 recorded during the 2002 Census.
