= Khoro, Suntarsky District, Sakha Republic =

Khoro Хоро
- Selo
- Interactive map of Khoro
- Location of Khoro Khoro (Sakha Republic)
- Coordinates: 62°33′35″N 117°48′05″E
- Country: Russia
- Federal subject: Sakha Republic
- Administrative district: Suntarsky District
- Rural okrugSelsoviet: Khorinsky Rural Okrug

Population (2010 Census)
  - Total: 272
  - Estimate (2021): 241 (−11.4%)

Administrative status
  - Capital of: Khorinsky Rural Okrug

Municipal status
  - Municipal district: Suntarsky Municipal District
  - Rural settlement: Khorinsky Rural Settlement
  - Capital of: Khorinsky Rural Settlement
- Time zone: UTC+
- Postal code: 678274
- OKTMO ID: 98648466101

Khoro (Russian: Хоро; Yakut: Хоро, Xoro) is a rural locality (a selo), the only inhabited locality, and the administrative center of Khorinsky Rural Okrug of Suntarsky District in the Sakha Republic, Russia, located 72 kilometers (45 mi) from Suntar, the administrative center of the district. Its population as of the 2010 Census was 272, down from 340 recorded during the 2002 Census.
