= Gavan, Zabaykalsky Krai =

Gavan Гавань
- Selo
- Location within Zabaykalsky Krai Location within Russia
- Coordinates: 49°27′N 112°10′E
- Country: Russia
- Region: Zabaykalsky Krai
- District: Kyrinsky District
- Time zone: UTC+9:00

Gavan (Russian: Гавань) is a rural locality (a selo) in Kyrinsky District, Zabaykalsky Krai, Russia. Population: 172 (2021 census); 358 (2010 census); 565 (2002 census); There are 8 streets in this selo.

== Geography ==
This rural locality is located 19 km from Kyra (the district's administrative centre), 301 km from Chita (capital of Zabaykalsky Krai) and 5,433 km from Moscow. Kyra is the nearest rural locality.
