= Allaga =

Allaga Аллага
- Selo

Other transcription(s)
  - Yakut: Аллыҥа
- Interactive map of Allaga
- Location of Allaga Allaga (Sakha Republic)
- Coordinates: 62°13′35″N 117°03′33″E
- Country: Russia
- Federal subject: Sakha Republic
- Administrative district: Suntarsky District
- Rural okrugSelsoviet: Allaginsky Rural Okrug

Population (2010 Census)
  - Total: 447
  - Estimate (2021): 430 (−3.8%)

Administrative status
  - Capital of: Allaginsky Rural Okrug

Municipal status
  - Municipal district: Suntarsky Municipal District
  - Rural settlement: Allaginsky Rural Settlement
  - Capital of: Allaginsky Rural Settlement
- Time zone: UTC+
- Postal code: 678279
- OKTMO ID: 98648404101

Allaga (Russian: Аллага; Yakut: Аллыҥа, romanized: Allıŋa) is a rural locality (a selo), the only inhabited locality, and the administrative center of Allaginsky Rural Okrug of Suntarsky District in the Sakha Republic, Russia, located 40 kilometers (25 mi) from Suntar, the administrative center of the district. Its population as of the 2010 Census was 447, down from 472 recorded during the 2002 Census.
