= Narasun =

Narasun Нарасун
- Selo
- Location within Zabaykalsky Krai Location within Russia
- Coordinates: 50°05′N 112°58′E
- Country: Russia
- Region: Zabaykalsky Krai
- District: Akshinsky District
- Time zone: UTC+9:00

Narasun (Russian: Нарасун) is a rural locality (a selo) in Akshinsky District, Zabaykalsky Krai, Russia. Population: 784 (2021 census); 929 (2010 census); 1,097 (2002 census); There are 9 streets in this selo.

== Geography ==
This rural locality is located 31 km from Aksha (the district's administrative centre), 219 km from Chita (capital of Zabaykalsky Krai) and 5,413 km from Moscow. Bytev is the nearest rural locality.
