= Ustye, Zabaykalsky Krai =

Ustye Устье
- Selo
- Location within Zabaykalsky Krai Location within Russia
- Coordinates: 49°00′N 111°00′E
- Country: Russia
- Region: Zabaykalsky Krai
- District: Kyrinsky District
- Time zone: UTC+9:00

Ustye (Russian: Устье) is a rural locality (a selo) in Kyrinsky District, Zabaykalsky Krai, Russia. Population: 7 (2010 census); 8 (2002 census); There are 2 streets in this selo.

== Geography ==
This rural locality is located 44 km from Kyra (the district's administrative centre), 255 km from Chita (capital of Zabaykalsky Krai) and 5,354 km from Moscow. Nadyozhny is the nearest rural locality.
