= Eyikyar =

Eyikyar Эйикяр
- Selo

Other transcription(s)
  - Yakut: Эйикээр
- Interactive map of Eyikyar
- Location of Eyikyar Eyikyar (Sakha Republic)
- Coordinates: 61°53′N 117°30′E
- Country: Russia
- Federal subject: Sakha Republic
- Administrative district: Suntarsky District
- Rural okrugSelsoviet: Khadansky Rural Okrug

Population (2010 Census)
  - Total: 7
  - Estimate (2021): 0 (−100%)

Municipal status
  - Municipal district: Suntarsky Municipal District
  - Rural settlement: Khadansky Rural Settlement
- Time zone: UTC+
- Postal code: 678271
- OKTMO ID: 98648465111

Eyikyar (Russian: Эйикяр; Yakut: Эйикээр, Eyikeer) is a rural locality (a selo) in Khadansky Rural Okrug of Suntarsky District in the Sakha Republic, Russia, located 36 kilometers (22 mi) from Suntar, the administrative center of the district, and 11 kilometers (6.8 mi) from Agdary, the administrative center of the rural okrug. Its population as of the 2010 Census was 7; up from 2 recorded in the 2002 Census.
