= Bordon 3-y =

Bordon 3-y Бордон 3-й
- Selo
- Interactive map of Bordon 3-y
- Location of Bordon 3-y Bordon 3-y (Sakha Republic)
- Coordinates: 62°32′09″N 117°13′24″E
- Country: Russia
- Federal subject: Sakha Republic
- Administrative district: Suntarsky District
- Rural okrugSelsoviet: Elgyaysky Rural Okrug

Population
  - Estimate (2002): 4 )

Municipal status
  - Municipal district: Suntarsky Municipal District
  - Rural settlement: Elgyaysky Rural Settlement
- Time zone: UTC+
- Postal code: 678274
- OKTMO ID: 98648475106

Bordon 3-y (Russian: Бордон 3-й; Yakut: Үһүс Бордоҥ, Ühüs Bordoŋ) is a rural locality (a selo), one of two settlements, in addition to Elgyay, the administrative centre of the Rural Okrug, in Elgyaysky Rural Okrug of Suntarsky District in the Sakha Republic, Russia. It is located 80 kilometers (50 mi) from Suntar, the administrative center of the district and 30 kilometers (19 mi) from Elgyay. Its population as of the 2002 Census was 4.
