= Kyukey =

Kyukey Кюкей
- Selo
- Interactive map of Kyukey
- Location of Kyukey Kyukey (Sakha Republic)
- Coordinates: 62°46′08″N 117°43′51″E
- Country: Russia
- Federal subject: Sakha Republic
- Administrative district: Suntarsky District
- Rural okrugSelsoviet: Kyukyaisky Rural Okrug

Population (2010 Census)
  - Total: 394
  - Estimate (2021): 390 (−1%)

Administrative status
  - Capital of: Kyukyaisky Rural Okrug

Municipal status
  - Municipal district: Suntarsky Municipal District
  - Rural settlement: Kyukyaisky Rural Settlement
  - Capital of: Kyukyaisky Rural Settlement
- Time zone: UTC+
- Postal code: 678275
- OKTMO ID: 98648443101

Kyukey (Russian: Кюкей; Yakut: Күүкэй, Küükey) is a rural locality (a selo), the only inhabited locality, and the administrative center of Kyukyaisky Rural Okrug of Suntarsky District in the Sakha Republic, Russia, located 88 kilometers (55 mi) from Suntar, the administrative center of the district. Its population as of the 2010 Census was 394, up from 345 recorded during the 2002 Census.
