= Bukukun =

Bukukun Букукун
- Selo
- Location within Zabaykalsky Krai Location within Russia
- Coordinates: 49°26′N 111°08′E
- Country: Russia
- Region: Zabaykalsky Krai
- District: Kyrinsky District
- Time zone: UTC+9:00

Bukukun (Russian: Букукун) is a rural locality (a selo) in Kyrinsky District, Zabaykalsky Krai, Russia. Population: 36 (2021 census); 36 (2010 census); There are 1 streets in this selo.

== Geography ==
This rural locality is located 62 km from Kyra (the district's administrative centre), 334 km from Chita (capital of Zabaykalsky Krai) and 5,361 km from Moscow. Shumunda is the nearest rural locality.
