= Tuoydakh =

Tuoydakh Туойдах
- Selo
- Interactive map of Tuoydakh
- Location of Tuoydakh Tuoydakh (Sakha Republic)
- Coordinates: 62°01′N 117°13′E
- Country: Russia
- Federal subject: Sakha Republic
- Administrative district: Suntarsky District
- Rural okrugSelsoviet: Tuoydakhsky Rural Okrug

Population (2010 Census)
  - Total: 157
  - Estimate (2021): 168 (+7%)

Administrative status
  - Capital of: Tuoydakhsky Rural Okrug

Municipal status
  - Municipal district: Suntarsky Municipal District
  - Rural settlement: Tuoydakhsky Rural Settlement
  - Capital of: Tuoydakhsky Rural Settlement
- Time zone: UTC+
- Postal code: 678290
- OKTMO ID: 98648461101

Tuoydakh (Russian: Туойдах; Yakut: Туойдаах, Tuoydaax) is a rural locality (a selo), the only inhabited locality, and the administrative center of Tuoydakhsky Rural Okrug of Suntarsky District in the Sakha Republic, Russia, located 20 kilometers (12 mi) from Suntar, the administrative center of the district. Its population as of the 2010 Census was 157, down from 162 recorded during the 2002 Census.
