= Elgyay =

Elgyay Эльгяй
- Selo

Other transcription(s)
  - Yakut: Элгээйи
- Interactive map of Elgyay
- Location of Elgyay Elgyay (Sakha Republic)
- Coordinates: 62°28′54″N 117°31′14″E
- Country: Russia
- Federal subject: Sakha Republic
- Administrative district: Suntarsky District
- Rural okrugSelsoviet: Elgyaysky Rural Okrug
- Founded: 1771

Population
  - Estimate (2002): 2,200 )

Administrative status
  - Capital of: Elgyaysky Rural Okrug

Municipal status
  - Municipal district: Suntarsky Municipal District
  - Rural settlement: Elgyaysky Rural Settlement
  - Capital of: Elgyaysky Rural Settlement
- Time zone: UTC+
- Postal code: 678274
- OKTMO ID: 98648475101

Elgyay (Russian: Эльгяй, Yakut: Элгээйи, romanized: Elgeeyi) is a rural locality (a selo), the administrative centre of and one of two settlements, in addition to Bordon 3-y, in Elgyaysky Rural Okrug of Suntarsky District in the Sakha Republic, Russia. It is located 50 kilometers (31 mi) from Suntar, the administrative center of the district. Its population as of the 2002 Census was 2,200.
