= Usun-Kyuyol, Suntarsky District, Sakha Republic =

Usun-Kyuyol Усун-Кюёль
- Selo
- Interactive map of Usun-Kyuyol
- Location of Usun-Kyuyol Usun-Kyuyol (Sakha Republic)
- Coordinates: 62°17′N 116°52′E
- Country: Russia
- Federal subject: Sakha Republic
- Administrative district: Suntarsky District
- Rural okrugSelsoviet: Arylakhsky Rural Okrug
- Elevation: 199 m (653 ft)

Population (2010 Census)
  - Total: 667
  - Estimate (2021): 622 (−6.7%)

Administrative status
  - Capital of: Arylakhsky Rural Okrug

Municipal status
  - Municipal district: Suntarsky Municipal District
  - Rural settlement: Arylakhsky Rural Settlement
  - Capital of: Arylakhsky Rural Settlement
- Time zone: UTC+
- Postal code: 678273
- OKTMO ID: 98648405101

Usun-Kyuyol (Russian: Усун-Кюёль; Yakut: Уһун Күөл, Uhun Küöl) is a rural locality (a selo), the only inhabited locality, and the administrative center of Arylakhsky Rural Okrug of Suntarsky District in the Sakha Republic, Russia, located 71 kilometers (44 mi) from Suntar, the administrative center of the district. Its population as of the 2010 Census was 667, down from 800 recorded during the 2002 Census.
