= Tenkya =

Tenkya Тенкя
- Selo
- Interactive map of Tenkya
- Location of Tenkya Tenkya (Sakha Republic)
- Coordinates: 61°59′56″N 116°34′56″E
- Country: Russia
- Federal subject: Sakha Republic
- Administrative district: Suntarsky District
- Rural okrugSelsoviet: Tenkinsky Rural Okrug

Population (2010 Census)
  - Total: 93
  - Estimate (2021): 100 (+7.5%)

Administrative status
  - Capital of: Tenkinsky Rural Okrug

Municipal status
  - Municipal district: Suntarsky Municipal District
  - Rural settlement: Tenkinsky Rural Settlement
  - Capital of: Tenkinsky Rural Settlement
- Time zone: UTC+
- Postal code: 678280
- OKTMO ID: 98648457101

Tenkya (Russian: Тенкя; Yakut: Тэҥкэ, Teŋke) is a rural locality (a selo), the only inhabited locality, and the administrative center of Tenkinsky Rural Okrug of Suntarsky District in the Sakha Republic, Russia, located 82 kilometers (51 mi) from Suntar, the administrative center of the district. Its population as of the 2010 Census was 93, down from 107 recorded during the 2002 Census.
