= Kutana =

Kutana (Russian: Кутана) is the name of several rural localities in the Sakha Republic, Russia:

- Kutana, Suntarsky District, Sakha Republic, a selo in Kutaninsky Rural Okrug of Suntarsky District of the Sakha Republic
- Kutana, Aldansky District, Sakha Republic, a selo in Anaminsky National Rural Okrug of Aldansky District of the Sakha Republic
