= Mikhaylo-Pavlovsk =

Mikhaylo-Pavlovsk Михайло-Павловск
- Selo
- Location within Zabaykalsky Krai Location within Russia
- Coordinates: 49°40′N 113°00′E
- Country: Russia
- Region: Zabaykalsky Krai
- District: Kyrinsky District
- Time zone: UTC+9:00

Mikhaylo-Pavlovsk (Russian: Михайло-Павловск) is a rural locality (a selo) in Kyrinsky District, Zabaykalsky Krai, Russia. Population: 274 (2021 census); 336 (2010 census); 457 (2002 census); There are 6 streets in this selo.

== Geography ==
This rural locality is located 76 km from Kyra (the district's administrative centre), 264 km from Chita (capital of Zabaykalsky Krai) and 5,467 km from Moscow. Turgen is the nearest rural locality.
