= Kharyyalakh, Suntarsky District, Sakha Republic =

Kharyyalakh Харыялах
- Selo
- Interactive map of Kharyyalakh
- Location of Kharyyalakh Kharyyalakh (Sakha Republic)
- Coordinates: 62°26′28″N 117°51′26″E
- Country: Russia
- Federal subject: Sakha Republic
- Administrative district: Suntarsky District
- Rural okrugSelsoviet: Kyundyayinsky Rural Okrug

Population
  - Estimate (2002): 0 )

Municipal status
  - Municipal district: Suntarsky Municipal District
  - Rural settlement: Kyundyayinsky Rural Settlement
- Time zone: UTC+
- Postal code: 678286
- OKTMO ID: 98648445111

Kharyyalakh (Russian: Харыялах; Yakut: Харыйалаах, Xarıyalaax) is a rural locality (a selo), one of three settlements, in addition to Kyundyae, the administrative centre of the Rural Okrug, and Elgyan in Vilyuchansky Rural Okrug of Suntarsky District in the Sakha Republic, Russia. It is located 49 kilometers (30 mi) from Suntar, the administrative center of the district and 17 kilometers (11 mi) from Kyundyae. Its population as of the 2002 Census was 0.
