= Kempendyay =

Kempendyay Кемпендяй
- Selo
- Interactive map of Kempendyay
- Location of Kempendyay Kempendyay (Sakha Republic)
- Coordinates: 62°02′04″N 118°36′44″E
- Country: Russia
- Federal subject: Sakha Republic
- Administrative district: Suntarsky District
- Rural okrugSelsoviet: Kempendyaysky Rural Okrug

Population
  - Estimate (2002): 483 )

Administrative status
  - Capital of: Kempendyaysky Rural Okrug

Municipal status
  - Municipal district: Suntarsky Municipal District
  - Rural settlement: Kempendyaysky Rural Settlement
  - Capital of: Kempendyaysky Rural Settlement
- Time zone: UTC+
- Postal code: 678272
- OKTMO ID: 98648425101

Kempendyay (Russian: Кемпендяй; Yakut: Кэмпэндээйи, Kempendeeyi) is a rural locality (a selo), the administrative centre of and one of two settlements, in addition to Chayygda, in Kempendyaysky Rural Okrug of Suntarsky District in the Sakha Republic, Russia. Its population as of the 2002 Census was 483.

== Geography ==
The village is located by the banks of the Kempendyay, a tributary of the Vilyuy, 55 kilometers (34 mi) from Suntar, the administrative center of the district.
