= Tolon, Tolonsky Rural Okrug, Suntarsky District, Sakha Republic =

Tolon Толон
- Selo
- Interactive map of Tolon
- Location of Tolon Tolon (Sakha Republic)
- Coordinates: 62°35′07″N 117°30′03″E
- Country: Russia
- Federal subject: Sakha Republic
- Administrative district: Suntarsky District
- Rural okrugSelsoviet: Tolonsky Rural Okrug

Population (2010 Census)
  - Total: 127
  - Estimate (2021): 125 (−1.6%)

Administrative status
  - Capital of: Tolonsky Rural Okrug

Municipal status
  - Municipal district: Suntarsky Municipal District
  - Rural settlement: Tolonsky Rural Settlement
  - Capital of: Tolonsky Rural Settlement
- Postal code: 678274

Tolon (Russian: Толон; Yakut: Толоон, Toloon) is a rural locality (a selo), the only inhabited locality, and the administrative center of Tolonsky Rural Okrug of Suntarsky District in the Sakha Republic, Russia, located 58 kilometers (36 mi) from Suntar, the administrative center of the district. Its population as of the 2010 Census was 127; down from 152 recorded in the 2002 Census.
