= Mar-Kyuyol =

Mar-Kyuyol Мар-Кюёль
- Selo
- Interactive map of Mar-Kyuyol
- Location of Mar-Kyuyol Mar-Kyuyol (Sakha Republic)
- Coordinates: 62°24′N 117°01′E
- Country: Russia
- Federal subject: Sakha Republic
- Administrative district: Suntarsky District
- Rural okrugSelsoviet: Mar-Kyuyolsky Rural Okrug
- Elevation: 193 m (633 ft)

Population (2010 Census)
  - Total: 506
  - Estimate (2021): 431 (−14.8%)

Administrative status
  - Capital of: Mar-Kyuyolsky Rural Okrug

Municipal status
  - Municipal district: Suntarsky Municipal District
  - Rural settlement: Mar-Kyuyolsky Rural Settlement
  - Capital of: Mar-Kyuyolsky Rural Settlement
- Time zone: UTC+
- Postal code: 678287
- OKTMO ID: 98648450101

Mar-Kyuyol (Russian: Мар-Кюёль; Yakut: Маар Күөл, Maar Küöl) is a rural locality (a selo), the only inhabited locality, and the administrative center of Mar-Kyuyolsky Rural Okrug of Suntarsky District in the Sakha Republic, Russia, located 87 kilometers (54 mi) from Suntar, the administrative center of the district. Its population as of the 2010 Census was 506, down from 628 recorded during the 2002 Census.
