= Kyundyae =

Kyundyae Кюндяе
- Selo
- Interactive map of Kyundyae
- Location of Kyundyae Kyundyae (Sakha Republic)
- Coordinates: 62°20′42″N 117°41′53″E
- Country: Russia
- Federal subject: Sakha Republic
- Administrative district: Suntarsky District
- Rural okrugSelsoviet: Kyundyayinsky Rural Okrug
- Elevation: 129 m (423 ft)

Population
  - Estimate (2002): 842 )

Administrative status
  - Capital of: Kyundyayinsky Rural Okrug

Municipal status
  - Municipal district: Suntarsky Municipal District
  - Rural settlement: Kyundyayinsky Rural Settlement
  - Capital of: Kyundyayinsky Rural Settlement
- Time zone: UTC+
- Postal code: 678286
- OKTMO ID: 98648445101

Kyundyae (Russian: Кюндяе; Yakut: Күндэйэ, Kündeye) is a rural locality (a selo), the administrative centre of and one of three settlements, in addition to Kharyalakh and Elgyan, in Kyundyayinsky Rural Okrug of Suntarsky District in the Sakha Republic, Russia. It is located 32 kilometers (20 mi) from Suntar, the administrative center of the district. Its population as of the 2002 Census was 842.
