= Sardanga =

Sardanga Сарданга
- Selo
- Interactive map of Sardanga
- Location of Sardanga Sardanga (Sakha Republic)
- Coordinates: 61°55′N 117°10′E
- Country: Russia
- Federal subject: Sakha Republic
- Administrative district: Suntarsky District
- Rural okrugSelsoviet: Bordonsky Rural Okrug
- Elevation: 135 m (443 ft)

Population (2010 Census)
  - Total: 904
  - Estimate (2021): 820 (−9.3%)

Administrative status
  - Capital of: Bordonsky Rural Okrug

Municipal status
  - Municipal district: Suntarsky Municipal District
  - Rural settlement: Bordonsky Rural Settlement
  - Capital of: Bordonsky Rural Settlement
- Time zone: UTC+
- Postal code: 678280
- OKTMO ID: 98648410101

Sardanga (Russian: Сарданга; Yakut: Сардаҥа, Sardaŋa) is a rural locality (a selo), the only inhabited locality, and the administrative center of Bordonsky Rural Okrug of Suntarsky District in the Sakha Republic, Russia, located 42 kilometers (26 mi) from Suntar, the administrative center of the district. The locality lies along the left bank of the Vilyuy River. Its population as of the 2010 Census was 904, down from 1,002 recorded during the 2002 Census.
