= Mordoy =

Mordoy Мордой
- Selo
- Location within Zabaykalsky Krai Location within Russia
- Coordinates: 49°41′N 112°01′E
- Country: Russia
- Region: Zabaykalsky Krai
- District: Kyrinsky District
- Time zone: UTC+9:00

Mordoy (Russian: Мордой) is a rural locality (a selo) in Kyrinsky District, Zabaykalsky Krai, Russia. Population: 345 (2021 census); 517 (2010 census); 656 (2002 census); There are 10 streets in this selo.

== Geography ==
This rural locality is located 14 km from Kyra (the district's administrative centre), 281 km from Chita (capital of Zabaykalsky Krai) and 5,394 km from Moscow. Shevartoy is the nearest rural locality.
