= Kuokunu =

Kuokunu Куокуну
- Selo
- Interactive map of Kuokunu
- Location of Kuokunu Kuokunu (Sakha Republic)
- Coordinates: 62°05′44″N 116°13′00″E
- Country: Russia
- Federal subject: Sakha Republic
- Administrative district: Suntarsky District
- Rural okrugSelsoviet: Kuokuninsky Rural Okrug

Population (2010 Census)
  - Total: 591
  - Estimate (2021): 518 (−12.4%)

Administrative status
  - Capital of: Kuokuninsky Rural Okrug

Municipal status
  - Municipal district: Suntarsky Municipal District
  - Rural settlement: Kuokuninsky Rural Settlement
  - Capital of: Kuokuninsky Rural Settlement
- Time zone: UTC+
- Postal code: 678281
- OKTMO ID: 98648435101

Kuokunu (Russian: Куокуну; Yakut: Куокуну) is a rural locality (a selo), the only inhabited locality, and the administrative center of Kuokuninsky Rural Okrug of Suntarsky District in the Sakha Republic, Russia, located 110 kilometers (68 mi) from Suntar, the administrative center of the district. Its population as of the 2010 Census was 591, down from 706 recorded during the 2002 Census.
