= Chayygda =

Chayygda Чайыгда
- Selo
- Interactive map of Chayygda
- Location of Chayygda Chayygda (Sakha Republic)
- Coordinates: 62°15′N 119°45′E
- Country: Russia
- Federal subject: Sakha Republic
- Administrative district: Suntarsky District
- Rural okrugSelsoviet: Kempendyaysky Rural Okrug

Population
  - Estimate (2002): 4 )

Municipal status
  - Municipal district: Suntarsky Municipal District
  - Rural settlement: Kempendyaysky Rural Settlement
- Time zone: UTC+
- Postal code: 678272
- OKTMO ID: 98648425106

Chayygda (Russian: Чайыгда; Yakut: Чайыҥда, Çayıŋda) is a rural locality (a selo) in Kempendyaysky Rural Okrug of Suntarsky District in the Sakha Republic, Russia, located 145 kilometers (90 mi) from Suntar, the administrative center of the district, and 90 kilometers (56 mi) from Kempendyay, the administrative center of the rural okrug. Its population as of the 2002 Census was 4.
