= Ilimnir =

Ilimnir Илимнир
- Selo
- Interactive map of Ilimnir
- Location of Ilimnir Ilimnir (Sakha Republic)
- Coordinates: 62°01′22″N 117°25′28″E
- Country: Russia
- Federal subject: Sakha Republic
- Administrative district: Suntarsky District
- Rural okrugSelsoviet: Ilimnirsky Rural Okrug

Population (2010 Census)
  - Total: 250
  - Estimate (2021): 271 (+8.4%)

Administrative status
  - Capital of: Ilimnirsky Rural Okrug

Municipal status
  - Municipal district: Suntarsky Municipal District
  - Rural settlement: Ilimnirsky Rural Settlement
  - Capital of: Ilimnirsky Rural Settlement
- Time zone: UTC+
- Postal code: 678271
- OKTMO ID: 98648422101

Ilimnir (Russian: Илимнир; Yakut: Илимниир, romanized: İlimniir) is a rural locality (a selo), the only inhabited locality, and the administrative center of Ilimnirsky Rural Okrug of Suntarsky District in the Sakha Republic, Russia, located 22 kilometers (14 mi) from Suntar, the administrative center of the district. Its population as of the 2010 Census was 250, up from 245 recorded during the 2002 Census.
