= Ustya =

Ustya may refer to:

- Ustya, Russia, alternative name of several rural localities in Moscow Oblast, Russia
- Ustya (river), a stream in Arkhangelsk Oblast of Russia
- Ustya, a diminutive of the Russian female first name Avgusta
- Ustya, a diminutive of the Russian male first name Avgustin
- Ustya, a diminutive of the Russian female first name Avgustina

== See also ==
- Ustia (disambiguation)
- Ustye, several rural localities in Russia
- Ustyansky District, a district of Arkhangelsk Oblast, Russia
