= Byas-Sheya =

Byas-Sheya Бясь-Шея
- Selo
- Interactive map of Byas-Sheya
- Location of Byas-Sheya Byas-Sheya (Sakha Republic)
- Coordinates: 62°50′N 117°32′E
- Country: Russia
- Federal subject: Sakha Republic
- Administrative district: Suntarsky District
- Rural okrugSelsoviet: Sheinsky Rural Okrug

Population
  - Estimate (2002): 0 )

Municipal status
  - Municipal district: Suntarsky Municipal District
  - Rural settlement: Sheinsky Rural Settlement
- Time zone: UTC+
- Postal code: 678276
- OKTMO ID: 98648470111

Byas-Sheya (Russian: Бясь-Шея; Yakut: Бэс Сиэйэ, Bes Sieye) is a rural locality (a selo) in Sheinsky Rural Okrug of Suntarsky District in the Sakha Republic, Russia, located 111 kilometers (69 mi) from Suntar, the administrative center of the district and 6 kilometers (3.7 mi) from Sheya, the administrative center of the rural okrug. As of the 2002 Census, it had no recorded population.
