= Oyusut =

Oyusut Оюсут
- Selo
- Interactive map of Oyusut
- Location of Oyusut Oyusut (Sakha Republic)
- Coordinates: 62°47′17″N 115°25′03″E
- Country: Russia
- Federal subject: Sakha Republic
- Administrative district: Suntarsky District
- Rural okrugSelsoviet: Vilyuchansky Rural Okrug
- Elevation: 147 m (482 ft)

Population
  - Estimate (2002): 4 )

Municipal status
  - Municipal district: Suntarsky Municipal District
  - Rural settlement: Vilyuchansky Rural Settlement
- Time zone: UTC+
- Postal code: 678284
- OKTMO ID: 98648415106

Oyusut (Russian: Оюсут; Yakut: Ойууһут, Oyuuhut) is a rural locality (a selo), one of two settlements, in addition to Khordogoy, the administrative centre of the Rural Okrug, in Vilyuchansky Rural Okrug of Suntarsky District in the Sakha Republic, Russia. It is located 208 kilometers (129 mi) from Suntar, the administrative center of the district and 50 kilometers (31 mi) from Khordogoy. Its population as of the 2002 Census was 4.
