= Bytev =

Bytev Бытэв
- Selo
- Location within Zabaykalsky Krai Location within Russia
- Coordinates: 50°09′N 113°07′E
- Country: Russia
- Region: Zabaykalsky Krai
- District: Akshinsky District
- Time zone: UTC+9:00

Bytev (Russian: Бытэв) is a rural locality (a selo) in Akshinsky District, Zabaykalsky Krai, Russia. Population: 334 (2021 census); 438 (2010 census); 482 (2002 census); There are 5 streets in this selo.

== Geography ==
This rural locality is located 18 km from Aksha (the district's administrative centre), 211 km from Chita (capital of Zabaykalsky Krai) and 5,416 km from Moscow. Narasun is the nearest rural locality.
