= Tumul, Suntarsky District, Sakha Republic =

Tumul Тумул
- Selo
- Interactive map of Tumul
- Location of Tumul Tumul (Sakha Republic)
- Coordinates: 62°43′24″N 117°45′09″E
- Country: Russia
- Federal subject: Sakha Republic
- Administrative district: Suntarsky District
- Rural okrugSelsoviet: Kutaninsky Rural Okrug

Population
  - Estimate (2002): 13 )

Municipal status
  - Municipal district: Suntarsky Municipal District
  - Rural settlement: Kutaninsky Rural Settlement
- Time zone: UTC+
- Postal code: 678275
- OKTMO ID: 98648440106

Tumul (Russian: Тумул; Yakut: Тумул, Tumul) is a rural locality (a selo), one of two settlements, in addition to Kutana, the administrative centre of the Rural Okrug, in Kutaninsky Rural Okrug of Suntarsky District in the Sakha Republic, Russia. It is located 87 kilometers (54 mi) from Suntar, the administrative center of the district and 8 kilometers (5.0 mi) from Khordogoy. Its population as of the 2002 Census was 13.
