= Arylakh (Zharkhan) =

Arylakh (Zharkhan) Арылах (Жархан)
- Selo
- Interactive map of Arylakh (Zharkhan)
- Location of Arylakh (Zharkhan) Arylakh (Zharkhan) (Sakha Republic)
- Coordinates: 62°22′N 116°38′E
- Country: Russia
- Federal subject: Sakha Republic
- Administrative district: Suntarsky District
- Rural okrugSelsoviet: Zharkhansky Rural Okrug
- Elevation: 216 m (709 ft)

Population (2010 Census)
  - Total: 513
  - Estimate (2021): 468 (−8.8%)

Administrative status
  - Capital of: Zharkhansky Rural Okrug

Municipal status
  - Municipal district: Suntarsky Municipal District
  - Rural settlement: Zharkhansky Rural Settlement
  - Capital of: Zharkhansky Rural Settlement
- Time zone: UTC+
- Postal code: 678285
- OKTMO ID: 98648420101

Arylakh (Zharkhan) (Russian: Арылах (Жархан); Yakut: Арыылаах (Дьаархан), Arıılaax (Caarxan)) is a rural locality (a selo) and the administrative center of Zharkhansky Rural Okrug in Suntarsky District of the Sakha Republic, Russia, located 86 kilometers (53 mi) from Suntar, the administrative center of the district. Its population as of the 2010 Census was 513; down from 586 recorded in the 2002 Census.
