= Bilyutuy =

Bilyutuy Билютуй
- Selo
- Location within Zabaykalsky Krai Location within Russia
- Coordinates: 49°35′N 111°41′E
- Country: Russia
- Region: Zabaykalsky Krai
- District: Kyrinsky District
- Time zone: UTC+9:00

Bilyutuy (Russian: Билютуй) is a rural locality (a selo) in Kyrinsky District, Zabaykalsky Krai, Russia. Population: 539 (2021 census); 643 (2010 census); 786 (2002 census); There are 7 streets in this selo.

== Geography ==
This rural locality is located 20 km from Kyra (the district's administrative centre), 303 km from Chita (capital of Zabaykalsky Krai) and 5,384 km from Moscow. Bylyra is the nearest rural locality.
