= Suntar Airport =

Airport in Russia

- IATA: SUY; ICAO: UENS; LID: СУН

Summary
- Airport type: Public
- Location: Suntar, Suntarsky District, Sakha Republic, Russia
- Coordinates: 62°11′05″N 117°38′10″E

Maps
- Sakha Republic in Russia

- Location of the airport in the Sakha Republic

Runways
Direction	Length		Surface
Direction	m	ft	Surface
17/35	1,800	5,906	Concrete
- Sources: GCM, STV

Suntar Airport (IATA: SUY, ICAO: UENS) is an airport, and possible former air base, serving and located 3 kilometres (1.9 mi) north of Suntar, Suntarsky District, in the Sakha Republic of Russia. It is a fairly extensive airfield. The large 300 metres (980 ft) long tarmac area suggests that it was used for deployments of attack or bomber aircraft into the Arctic regions.

There is also a Suntar Khayata mountain range on the Kolyma Highway.

== Airlines and destinations ==
Airlines	Destinations
Polar Airlines	Yakutsk

== See also ==
- List of airports in Russia
