= Ustia =

Ustia may refer to:

== Geography ==
- Ustia, Dubăsari, a commune in Dubăsari district, Moldova
- Ustia, Glodeni, a commune in Glodeni district, Moldova
- Ustia, Ukraine, a village in Ternopil Oblast
- Ustia, a river in Ukraine, a tributary of the Horyn
- Ostiano, spelled Üstià in Brescian, a commune in Cremona, Italy

== Other uses ==
- Ustia (therapsid), an extinct genus of biarmosuchian therapsids
- US Travel Insurance Association (UStiA)

== See also ==
- Ustya (disambiguation)
