= Ustye, Sakha Republic =

Ustye Устье
- Selo

Other transcription(s)
  - Yakut: Уустуйа
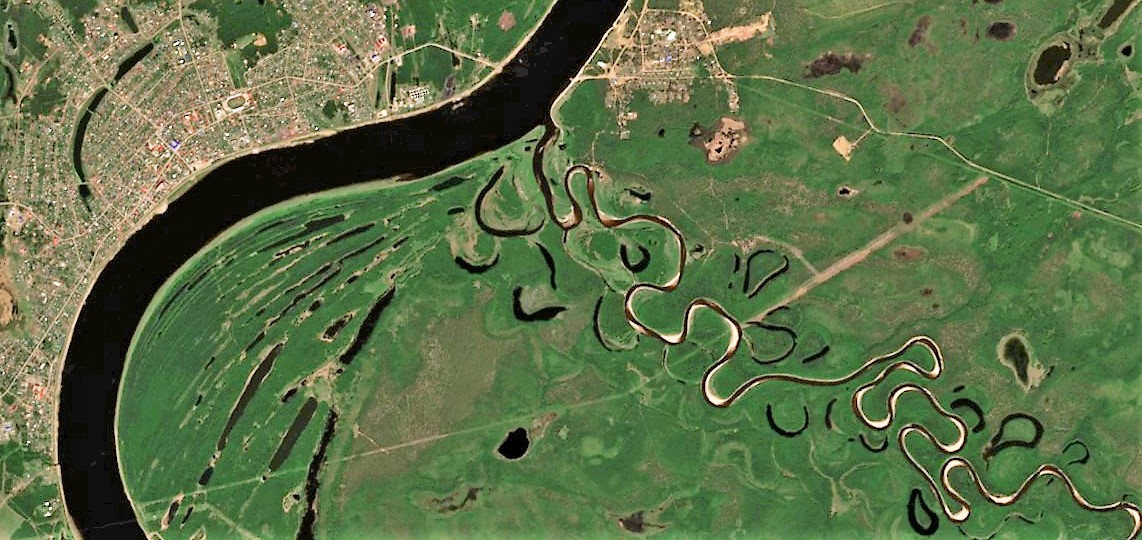
- Interactive map of Ustye
- Location of Ustye Ustye (Sakha Republic)
- Coordinates: 62°10′N 117°45′E
- Country: Russia
- Federal subject: Sakha Republic
- Administrative district: Suntarsky District
- Rural okrugSelsoviet: Ustyinsky Rural Okrug
- Elevation: 137 m (449 ft)

Population (2010 Census)
  - Total: 337
  - Estimate (2021): 311 (−7.7%)

Administrative status
  - Capital of: Ustyinsky Rural Okrug

Municipal status
  - Municipal district: Suntarsky Municipal District
  - Rural settlement: Ustyinsky Rural Settlement
  - Capital of: Ustyinsky Rural Settlement
- Time zone: UTC+
- Postal code: 678278
- OKTMO ID: 98648480101

Ustye (Russian: Устье; Yakut: Уустуйа, romanized: Uustuya) is a rural locality (a selo), the only inhabited locality, and the administrative center of Ustyinsky Rural Okrug of Suntarsky District in the Sakha Republic, Russia. Its population as of the 2010 Census was 337, down from 406 recorded during the 2002 Census.

== Geography ==
The village is located by the right bank of the Vilyuy, near the mouth of the Kempendyay, one of its tributaries, 5 kilometers (3.1 mi) from Suntar, the administrative center of the district.
