= Tyubyay =

Tyubyay Тюбяй
- Selo

Other transcription(s)
  - Yakut: Түбэй
- Interactive map of Tyubyay
- Location of Tyubyay Tyubyay (Sakha Republic)
- Coordinates: 62°52′N 117°28′E
- Country: Russia
- Federal subject: Sakha Republic
- Administrative district: Suntarsky District
- Rural okrugSelsoviet: Tyubyaysky Rural Okrug

Population
  - Estimate (2002): 270 )

Administrative status
  - Capital of: Tyubyaysky Rural Okrug

Municipal status
  - Municipal district: Suntarsky Municipal District
  - Rural settlement: Tyubyaysky Rural Settlement
  - Capital of: Tyubyaysky Rural Settlement
- Time zone: UTC+
- Postal code: 678276
- OKTMO ID: 98648463101

Tyubyay (Russian: Тюбяй; Yakut: Түбэй, romanized: Tübey) is a rural locality (a selo) and the administrative center of Tyubyaysky Rural Okrug of Suntarsky District in the Sakha Republic, Russia, located 95 kilometers (59 mi) from Suntar, the administrative center of the district. Its population as of the 2002 Census was 270.
