= Nizhny Stan =

Nizhny Stan Нижний Стан
- Selo
- Location within Zabaykalsky Krai Location within Russia
- Coordinates: 49°45′N 112°31′E
- Country: Russia
- Region: Zabaykalsky Krai
- District: Kyrinsky District
- Time zone: UTC+9:00

Nizhny Stan (Russian: Нижний Стан) is a rural locality (a selo) in Kyrinsky District, Zabaykalsky Krai, Russia. Population: 2 (2021 census); 24 (2010 census);

== Geography ==
This rural locality is located 44 km from Kyra (the district's administrative centre), 263 km from Chita (capital of Zabaykalsky Krai) and 5,422 km from Moscow. Tarbaldzhey is the nearest rural locality.
