= Hamnigan =

Subgroup of Mongolized Evenki

Total population
- c. 10,000

Regions with significant populations
- Zabaykalsky Krai, Russia; Northeastern Mongolia; Hulunbuir, China

Languages
- Khamnigan; Old Barag dialect of Evenki

Religion
- Mongolian shamanism, Tibetan Buddhism

Related ethnic groups
- Mongolic peoples, Evenks

The Khamnigan, Hamnigan Mongols, or Tungus Evenki, are an ethnic subgroup of Mongolized Evenks. Khamnigan is the Buryat–Mongolian term for all Ewenkis. In the early 16th century, the Evenks of Transbaikalia or Khamnigans were tributary to the Khalkha. They who lived around Nerchinsk and the Aga steppe faced both Cossack demands for tribute and Khori-Buriats trying to occupy their pastures. Most of them came under the Cossack rule and enrolled the Cossack regiments in the Selenge valley. The Khori Buriats occupied most of the Aga steppe and forced the Ewenkis to flee to the Qing Dynasty.

After 1880, Russia's Khamnigan moved to semi nomadic herding of cattle, sheep, camels and horses. Some time after 1918 the Evenks, along with their Buriat neighbors, fled over the border into Mongolia and Hulun Buir, establishing the current Khamnigan communities there. The Khamnigan of Mongolia, numbering 300 households, are scattered among the Buriats and speak only the Khamnigan dialect of Buriat language. They live around the Yeruu Lake, Dornod and Khentii provinces as well as Möngönmorit of Töv Province.

Another community migrated to Inner Mongolia in China. They still use a language heavily influenced by Russian and attach symbolic importance to bread.

There are approximately 535 Hamnigans in Mongolia and approximately 3,000 Hamnigans in Selenge Province, Mongolia. Not all Hamnigans are of Tungusic origin; there are some Mongols among the Hamnigans. In China, the Khamnigan (around 2,500) are classified as Evenks.

== Notable Hamnigan ==
- Semyon Nomokonov (1900–1973), Soviet sniper during World War II
