= Ustye, Khokholsky District, Voronezh Oblast =

Ustye Устье
- Selo
- Location within Voronezh Oblast Location within Russia
- Coordinates: 51°33′N 39°01′E
- Country: Russia
- Region: Voronezh Oblast
- District: Khokholsky District
- Time zone: UTC+3:00

Ustye (Russian: Устье) is a rural locality (a selo) in Petinskoye Rural Settlement, Khokholsky District, Voronezh Oblast, Russia. The population was 1,104 as of 2010. There are 20 streets.

== Geography ==
Ustye is located on the right bank of the Don River, 22 km of from Khokholsky (the district's administrative centre) by road. Malyshevo is the nearest rural locality.
