= Delyun =

Delyun Делюн
- Selo
- Location within Zabaykalsky Krai Location within Russia
- Coordinates: 52°00′N 117°00′E
- Country: Russia
- Region: Zabaykalsky Krai
- District: Sretensky District
- Time zone: UTC+9:00

Delyun (Russian: Делюн) is a rural locality (a selo) in Sretensky District, Zabaykalsky Krai, Russia. Population: 56 (2021 census); 72 (2010 census); There is 1 street in this selo.

== Geography ==
This rural locality is located 18 km from Sretensk (the district's administrative centre), 270 km from Chita (capital of Zabaykalsky Krai) and 5,454 km from Moscow. Ust-Kurlych is the nearest rural locality.
