= Ustye, Ivanovo Oblast =

Ustye Устье
- Village
- Location within Ivanovo Oblast Location within Russia
- Coordinates: 56°55′N 40°20′E
- Country: Russia
- Region: Ivanovo Oblast
- District: Komsomolsky District
- Time zone: UTC+3:00

Ustye (Russian: Устье) is a rural locality (a village) in Komsomolsky District, Ivanovo Oblast, Russia. Population: 36 (2010 census);

== Geography ==
This rural locality is located 11 kilometres (6.8 mi) from Komsomolsk (the district's administrative centre), 39 kilometres (24 mi) from Ivanovo (capital of Ivanovo Oblast) and 210 kilometres (130 mi) from Moscow. Savikha is the nearest rural locality.
