= Zugalay =

Zugalay Зугалай
- Selo
- Location within Zabaykalsky Krai Location within Russia
- Coordinates: 51°28′N 115°01′E
- Country: Russia
- Region: Zabaykalsky Krai
- District: Mogoytuysky District
- Time zone: UTC+9:00

Zugalay (Russian: Зугалай) is a rural locality (a selo) in Mogoytuysky District, Zabaykalsky Krai, Russia. Population: 971 (2021 census); 1,434 (2010 census); 1,552 (2002 census); There are 36 streets in this selo.

== Geography ==
This rural locality is located 22 km from Mogoytuy (the district's administrative centre), 123 km from Chita (capital of Zabaykalsky Krai) and 5,383 km from Moscow. Khara-Shibir is the nearest rural locality.
