= Ustye, Vashkinsky District, Vologda Oblast =

Ustye Устье
- Village
- Location within Vologda Oblast Location within Russia
- Coordinates: 60°15′N 38°14′E
- Country: Russia
- Region: Vologda Oblast
- District: Vashkinsky District
- Time zone: UTC+3:00

Ustye (Russian: Устье) is a rural locality (a village) in Vasilyevskoye Rural Settlement, Vashkinsky District, Vologda Oblast, Russia. The population was 13 as of 2002.

== Geography ==
Ustye is located 17 km east of Lipin Bor (the district's administrative centre) by road. Toropunino is the nearest rural locality.
