= Ustye, Vladimir Oblast =

Ustye Устье
- Selo
- Location within Vladimir Oblast Location within Russia
- Coordinates: 56°02′N 40°11′E
- Country: Russia
- Region: Vladimir Oblast
- District: Sobinsky District
- Time zone: UTC+3:00

Ustye (Russian: Устье) is a rural locality (a selo) in Kolokshanskoye Rural Settlement, Sobinsky District, Vladimir Oblast, Russia. The population was 38 as of 2010.

== Geography ==
Ustye is located 27 km northeast of Sobinka (the district's administrative centre) by road. Bolshoye is the nearest rural locality.
