= Ustye, Totemsky District, Vologda Oblast =

Ustye Устье
- Village
- Location within Vologda Oblast Location within Russia
- Coordinates: 59°47′N 42°37′E
- Country: Russia
- Region: Vologda Oblast
- District: Totemsky District
- Time zone: UTC+3:00

Ustye (Russian: Устье) is a rural locality (a village) in Kalininskoye Rural Settlement, Totemsky District, Vologda Oblast, Russia. The population was 249 as of 2002.

== Geography ==
Ustye is located 37 km southwest of Totma (the district's administrative centre) by road. Lyubavchikha is the nearest rural locality.
