= Ustye, Vytegorsky District, Vologda Oblast =

Ustye Устье
- Village
- Location within Vologda Oblast Location within Russia
- Coordinates: 61°11′N 36°26′E
- Country: Russia
- Region: Vologda Oblast
- District: Vytegorsky District
- Time zone: UTC+3:00

Ustye (Russian: Устье) is a rural locality (a village) in Andomskoye Rural Settlement, Vytegorsky District, Vologda Oblast, Russia. The population was 5 as of 2002.

== Geography ==
Ustye is located 29 km north of Vytegra (the district's administrative centre) by road. Shchekino is the nearest rural locality.
