= Sheya =

Sheya Шея
- Selo

Other transcription(s)
  - Yakut: Сиэйэ
- Interactive map of Sheya
- Location of Sheya Sheya (Sakha Republic)
- Coordinates: 62°51′N 117°33′E
- Country: Russia
- Federal subject: Sakha Republic
- Administrative district: Suntarsky District
- Rural okrugSelsoviet: Sheinsky Rural Okrug
- Elevation: 125 m (410 ft)

Population
  - Estimate (2002): 866 )

Administrative status
  - Capital of: Sheinsky Rural Okrug

Municipal status
  - Municipal district: Suntarsky Municipal District
  - Rural settlement: Sheinsky Rural Settlement
  - Capital of: Sheinsky Rural Settlement
- Time zone: UTC+
- Postal code: 678276
- OKTMO ID: 98648470101

Sheya (Russian: Шея; Yakut: Сиэйэ, romanized: Sieye) is a rural locality (a selo) and the administrative center of Sheinsky Rural Okrug in Suntarsky District of the Sakha Republic, Russia, located 95 kilometers (59 mi) from Suntar, the administrative center of the district. Its population as of the 2002 Census was 866.
