= Ustya, Russia =

Ustya (Russian: Устья) is an alternative name of several rural localities in Moscow Oblast, Russia:

- Ustya, alternative name of Ust-Pristan, a village in Bolsherogachevskoye Rural Settlement of Dmitrovsky District; 56°30′N 37°7′E
- Ustya, alternative name of Ustye, a village in Volchenkovskoye Rural Settlement of Naro-Fominsky District; 55°16′N 36°20′E
