= Arylakh, Suntarsky District, Sakha Republic =

Arylakh Арылах
- Selo

Other transcription(s)
  - Yakut: Арыылаах
- Interactive map of Arylakh
- Location of Arylakh Arylakh (Sakha Republic)
- Coordinates: 62°59′N 117°31′E
- Country: Russia
- Federal subject: Sakha Republic
- Administrative district: Suntarsky District
- Rural okrugSelsoviet: Tyubyay-Zharkhansky Rural Okrug
- Elevation: 120 m (390 ft)

Population
  - Estimate (2021): 478 )

Administrative status
  - Capital of: Tyubyay-Zharkhansky Rural Okrug

Municipal status
  - Municipal district: Suntarsky Municipal District
  - Rural settlement: Tyubyay-Zharkhansky Rural Settlement
  - Capital of: Tyubyay-Zharkhansky Rural Settlement
- Time zone: UTC+
- Postal code: 678285
- OKTMO ID: 98648462101

Arylakh (Russian: Арылах; Yakut: Арыылаах, romanized: Arıılaax) is a rural locality (a selo) and the administrative center of Tyubyay-Zharkhansky Rural Okrug of Suntarsky District in the Sakha Republic, Russia, located 112 kilometers (70 mi) from Suntar, the administrative center of the district. Its population as of the 2002 Census was 643.
