= Suntarsky District =

Suntarsky District Сунтарский улус (Russian)
- District

Other transcription(s)
  - Sakha: Сунтаар улууhа
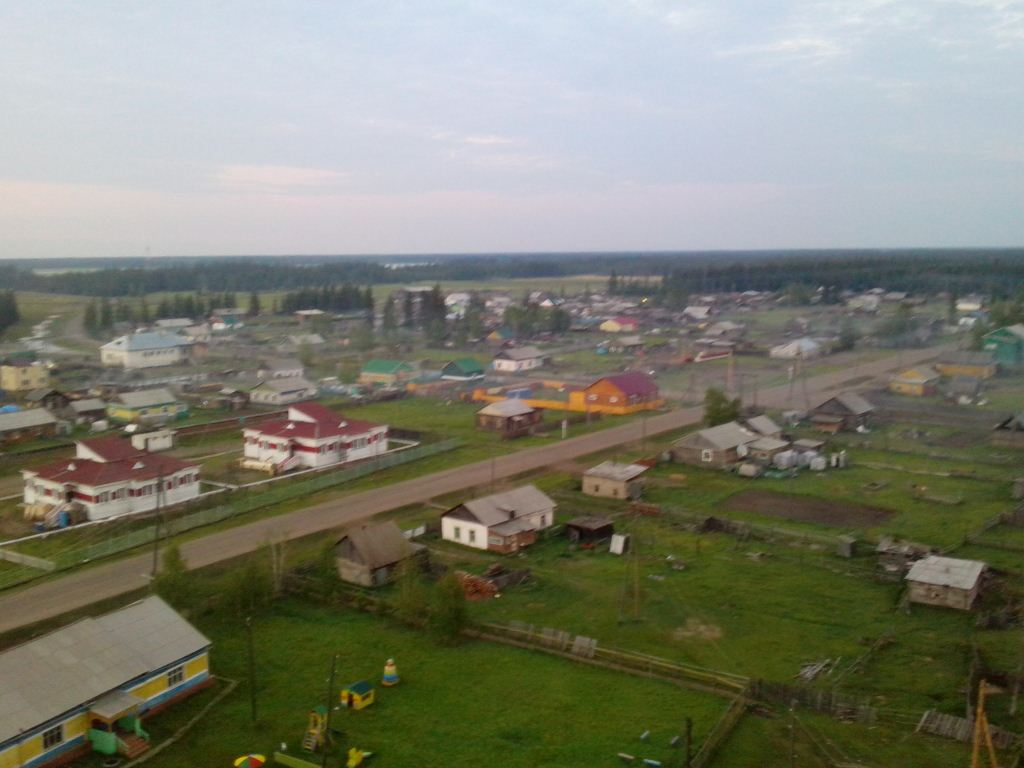
- Selo of Toybokhoy, Suntarsky District

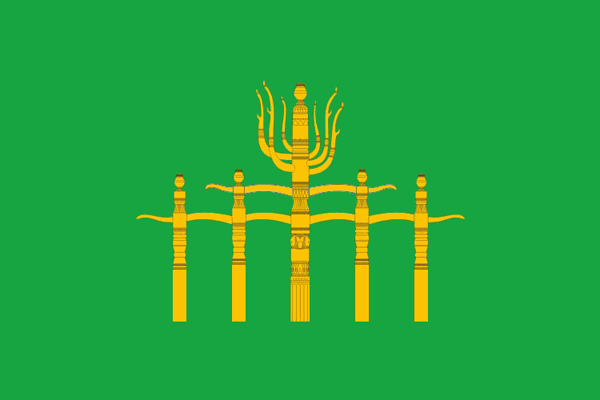
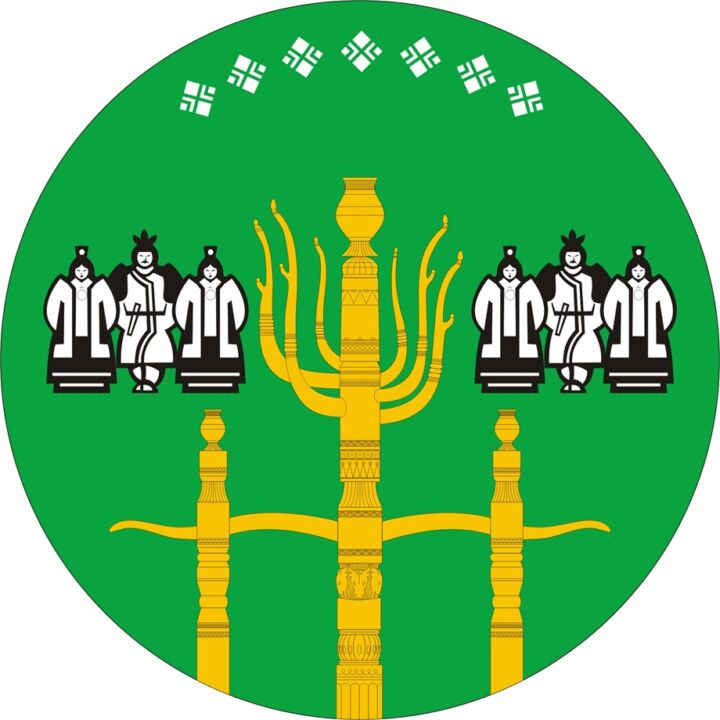
- Flag Coat of arms
- Location of Suntarsky District in the Sakha Republic
- Coordinates: 62°12′N 117°36′E
- Country: Russia
- Federal subject: Sakha Republic
- Established: January 9, 1930
- Administrative center: Suntar

Area
  - Total: 57,800 km^{2} (22,300 sq mi)

Population (2010 Census)
  - Total: 25,140
  - Density: 0.435/km^{2} (1.13/sq mi)
  - Urban: 0%
  - Rural: 100%

Administrative structure
  - Administrative divisions: 26 rural okrug
  - Inhabited localities: 39 rural localities

Municipal structure
  - Municipally incorporated as: Suntarsky Municipal District
  - Municipal divisions: 0 urban settlements, 26 rural settlements
- Time zone: UTC+
- OKTMO ID: 98648000
- Website: https://mr-suntarskij.sakha.gov.ru/

Suntarsky District (Russian: Сунта́рский улу́с; Yakut: Сунтаар улууһа, Suntaar uluuha, [suntaːɾ uluːha]) is an administrative and municipal district (raion, or ulus), one of the thirty-four in the Sakha Republic, Russia. It is located in the western central part of the republic and borders with Nyurbinsky District in the north and northeast, Verkhnevilyuysky District in the east, Olyokminsky District in the southeast, Lensky District in the southwest, and with Mirninsky District in the west. The area of the district is 57,800 square kilometers (22,300 sq mi). Its administrative center is the rural locality (a selo) of Suntar. Population: 25,140 (2010 census); 25,485 (2002 Census); 26,035 (1989 Soviet census). The population of Suntar accounts for 39.9% of the district's total population.

== Geography ==
The main river in the district is the Vilyuy.

=== Climate ===
Average January temperature ranges from −34 to −50 °C (−29 to −58 °F) and average July temperature ranges from +17 to +18 °C (63 to 64 °F). Annual precipitation is about 250–300 millimeters (9.8–11.8 in).

== History ==
The district was established on January 9, 1930.

== Demographics ==
As of the 2021 Census, the ethnic composition was as follows:

- Yakuts: 97.8%
- Evens: 0.7%
- Russians: 0.6%
- other: 0.9%

== Economy ==
The economy of the district is mostly based on agriculture. There are deposits of gold, brown coal, gypsum, anhydrite, construction materials, and others minerals.

=== Transportation ===
The Vilyuy Highway runs through the district, connecting it with Yakutsk, Vilyuysk, and Mirny. There is an airport in Suntar.

== Inhabited localities ==
Municipal composition
Rural settlements	Population	Male	Female	Rural localities in jurisdiction*
Allaginsky Nasleg (Аллагинский)	447	224 (50.1%)	223 (49.9%)	**selo of Allaga**
Arylakhsky Nasleg (Арылахский)	667	319 (47.8%)	348 (52.2%)	**selo of Usun-Kyuyol**
Bordonsky Nasleg (Бордонский)	904	461 (51.0%)	443 (49.0%)	**selo of Sardanga**
Vilyuchansky Nasleg (Вилючанский)	672	327 (48.7%)	345 (51.3%)	**selo of Khordogoy**; selo of Oyusut
Zharkhansky Nasleg (Жарханский)	513	253 (49.3%)	260 (50.7%)	**selo of Arylakh (Zharkhan)**
Ilimnirsky Nasleg (Илимнирский)	250	140 (56.0%)	110 (44.0%)	**selo of Ilimnir**
Kempendyaysky Nasleg (Кемпендяйский)	448	204 (45.5%)	244 (54.5%)	**selo of Kempendyay**; selo of Chayygda
Krestyakhsky Nasleg (Крестяхский)	882	453 (51.4%)	429 (48.6%)	**selo of Krestyakh**
Kuokuninsky Nasleg (Куокунинский)	591	310 (52.5%)	281 (47.5%)	**selo of Kuokunu**
Kutaninsky Nasleg (Кутанинский)	1,013	498 (49.2%)	515 (50.8%)	**selo of Kutana**; selo of Tumul
Kyukyaisky Nasleg (Кюкяйский)	394	206 (52.3%)	188 (47.7%)	**selo of Kyukey**
Kyundyayinsky Nasleg (Кюндяйинский)	832	416 (50.0%)	416 (50.0%)	**selo of Kyundyae**; selo of Kharyalakh; selo of Elgyan
Mar-Kyuyolsky Nasleg (Мар-Кюёльский)	506	249 (49.2%)	257 (50.8%)	**selo of Mar-Kyuyol**
Nakharinsky Nasleg (Нахаринский)	113	62 (54.9%)	51 (45.1%)	**selo of Nakhara**
Suntarsky Nasleg (Сунтарский)	10,034	4,661 (46.5%)	5,373 (53.5%)	**selo of Suntar** (Administrative centre of the district)
Tenkinsky Nasleg (Тенкинский)	93	50 (53.8%)	43 (46.2%)	**selo of Tenkya**
Toybokhoysky Nasleg (Тойбохойский)	1,600	769 (48.1%)	831 (51.9%)	**selo of Toybokhoy**
Tolonsky Nasleg (Толонский)	127	67 (52.8%)	60 (47.2%)	**selo of Tolon**
Tuoydakhsky Nasleg (Туойдахский)	157	92 (58.6%)	65 (41.4%)	**selo of Tuoydakh**
Tyubyaysky Nasleg (Тюбяйский)	305	154 (50.5%)	151 (49.5%)	**selo of Tyubyay**; selo of Neryuktyay
Tyubyay-Zharkhansky Nasleg (Тюбяй-Жарханский)	664	330 (49.7%)	334 (50.3%)	**selo of Arylakh**; selo of Milyake; selo of Ygyatta
Ustinsky Nasleg (Устьинский)	337	163 (48.4%)	174 (51.6%)	**selo of Ustye**
Khadansky Nasleg (Хаданский)	436	232 (53.2%)	204 (46.8%)	**selo of Agdary**; selo of Tolon; selo of Eyikyar
Khorinsky Nasleg (Хоринский)	272	133 (48.6%)	139 (51.1%)	**selo of Khoro**
Sheinsky Nasleg (Шеинский)	851	422 (49.6%)	429 (50.4%)	**selo of Sheya**; selo of Byas-Sheya; selo of Komsomol
Elgyaysky Nasleg (Эльгяйский)	2,032	974 (47.9%)	1,058 (52.7%)	**selo of Elgyay**; selo of Bordon 3-y

Divisional source:
Population source:
*Administrative centers are shown in bold

== See also ==
- Lena Plateau
