= Akshinsky District =

Akshinsky District Акшинский район (Russian)
- District
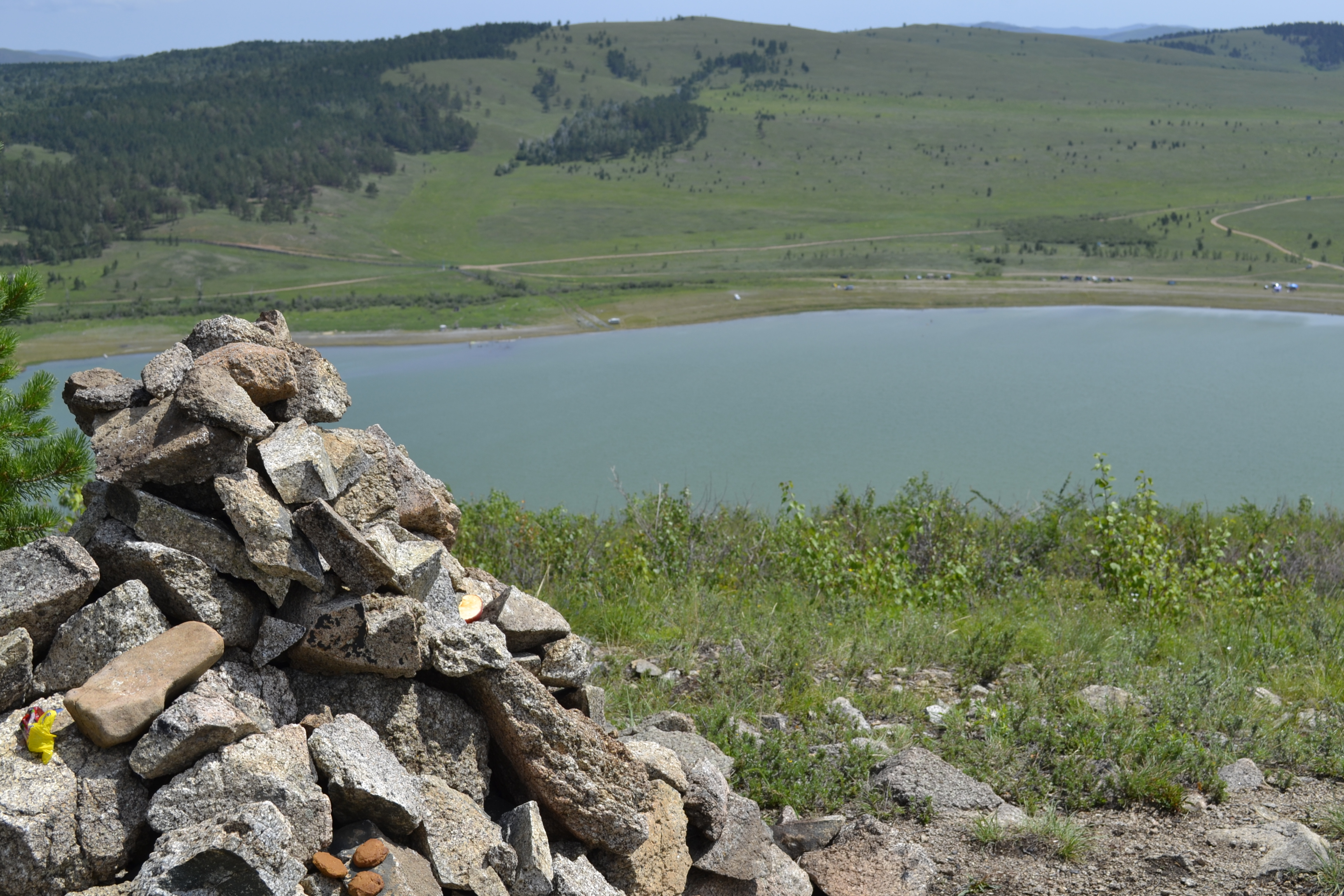
- Akshinsky Nature Reserve
- Location of Akshinsky District in Zabaykalsky Krai
- Coordinates: 50°18′N 113°08′E
- Country: Russia
- Federal subject: Zabaykalsky Krai
- Established: March 4, 1926
- Administrative center: Aksha

Area
  - Total: 7,400 km^{2} (2,900 sq mi)

Population (2010 Census)
  - Total: 10,682
  - Estimate (2018): 9,064 (−15.1%)
  - Density: 1.4/km^{2} (3.7/sq mi)
  - Urban: 0%
  - Rural: 100%

Administrative structure
  - Inhabited localities: 15 rural localities

Municipal structure
  - Municipally incorporated as: Akshinsky Municipal District
  - Municipal divisions: 0 urban settlements, 12 rural settlements
- Time zone: UTC+9 (MSK+6)
- OKTMO ID: 76603000
- Website: http://xn--80aa3a8c.xn--80aaaac8algcbgbck3fl0q.xn--p1ai/

Akshinsky District (Russian: Акшинский район) is an administrative and municipal district (raion), one of the thirty-one in Zabaykalsky Krai, Russia. It is located in the south of the krai and borders with Ononsky, Ulyotovsky, and Kyrinsky Districts of Zabaykalsky Krai, as well as with Mongolia. The area of the district is 7,400 square kilometers (2,900 sq mi). Administrative center is the rural locality (a selo) of Aksha. Population: 10,682 (2010 census); 12,080 (2002 Census); 14,695 (1989 Soviet census). The population of Aksha accounts for 36.9% of the district's total population.

== Geography ==
The Onon River flows through the district.

== History ==
The district was established on March 4, 1926.

== Economy ==
The district's landscape is suitable for agriculture. The mineral resources of the district include gold, uranium, precious stones, and timber.
