= Kyra, Russia =

Kyra Кыра
- Selo
- Interactive map of Kyra
- Location of Kyra Kyra (Zabaykalsky Krai)
- Coordinates: 49°34′N 111°58′E
- Country: Russia
- Federal subject: Zabaykalsky Krai
- Administrative district: Kyrinsky District
- Founded: 1728

Population (2010 Census)
  - Total: 4,563
  - Estimate (2017): 4,246 (−6.9%)

Administrative status
  - Capital of: Kyrinsky District
- Time zone: UTC+9 (MSK+6)
- Postal code: 423350
- OKTMO ID: 76624425101

Kyra (Russian: Кыра) is a rural locality (a selo) and the administrative center of Kyrinsky District of Zabaykalsky Krai, Russia. Population: 4,563 (2010 census); 4,654 (2002 census); 5,101 (1989 Soviet census).

== Geography ==
The village is located in the area of the Khentei-Daur Highlands on the left bank of the Kyra River, near the Russian-Mongolian border.

== Transportation ==
A local road to the north through the selo of Mordoy connects Kyra to the regional road A167, which leads to the border with Mongolia to the south and Aksha, Duldurga, and Darasun to the north. Local roads also connect to the rural localities of Gavan and Bilyutuy.

== Climate ==
Kyra has a borderline subarctic/humid continental climate (Köppen climate classification Dwc/Dwb) with very dry, severely cold winters and warm, wet summers.

Climate data for Kyra (1991-2020, extremes 1927-present)
Month	Jan	Feb	Mar	Apr	May	Jun	Jul	Aug	Sep	Oct	Nov	Dec	Year
Record high °C (°F)	2.3 (36.1)	11.7 (53.1)	20.4 (68.7)	30.3 (86.5)	35.2 (95.4)	39.2 (102.6)	39.0 (102.2)	39.1 (102.4)	33.2 (91.8)	26.8 (80.2)	14.5 (58.1)	6.8 (44.2)	39.2 (102.6)
Mean daily maximum °C (°F)	−13.3 (8.1)	−6.7 (19.9)	1.5 (34.7)	10.9 (51.6)	18.9 (66.0)	24.4 (75.9)	25.7 (78.3)	23.5 (74.3)	17.7 (63.9)	8.2 (46.8)	−4.0 (24.8)	−12.1 (10.2)	7.9 (46.2)
Daily mean °C (°F)	−21.4 (−6.5)	−16.0 (3.2)	−7.1 (19.2)	2.5 (36.5)	10.3 (50.5)	16.2 (61.2)	18.4 (65.1)	15.9 (60.6)	9.2 (48.6)	−0.1 (31.8)	−11.6 (11.1)	−19.4 (−2.9)	−0.3 (31.5)
Mean daily minimum °C (°F)	−27.6 (−17.7)	−23.7 (−10.7)	−15.1 (4.8)	−5.4 (22.3)	1.6 (34.9)	8.1 (46.6)	11.9 (53.4)	9.4 (48.9)	1.9 (35.4)	−6.7 (19.9)	−17.5 (0.5)	−25.0 (−13.0)	−7.3 (18.8)
Record low °C (°F)	−46.0 (−50.8)	−44.8 (−48.6)	−37.9 (−36.2)	−25.0 (−13.0)	−12.6 (9.3)	−4.2 (24.4)	−1.5 (29.3)	−6.3 (20.7)	−11.8 (10.8)	−28.6 (−19.5)	−35.8 (−32.4)	−45.0 (−49.0)	−46.0 (−50.8)
Average precipitation mm (inches)	2 (0.1)	2 (0.1)	5 (0.2)	10 (0.4)	24 (0.9)	61 (2.4)	103 (4.1)	87 (3.4)	40 (1.6)	13 (0.5)	5 (0.2)	4 (0.2)	356 (14.1)
Average precipitation days (≥ 1.0 mm)	1	1	1	2	4	8	11	10	5	3	1	1	48
Average relative humidity (%)	72	64	56	48	48	58	67	69	63	61	69	73	62
Mean monthly sunshine hours	178.7	209.4	259.3	266.9	289.4	281.7	260.2	248.0	237.3	217.0	173.3	152.0	2,773.2
Source 1: Погода и Климат (1991-2020)
Source 2: NOAA
