= Aksha, Russia =

Aksha Акша
- Interactive map of Aksha
- Location within Zabaykalsky Krai Location within Russia
- Coordinates: 50°16′54″N 113°17′13″E
- Country: Russia
- Federal subject: Zabaykalsky Krai
- Founded: 1750
- Elevation: 732 m (2,402 ft)

Population
  - Estimate (1989): 4,637 )
- Time zone: UTC+9 (MSK+6)
- Postal code: 674230
- OKTMO ID: 76603411101

Aksha (Russian: Акша) is a rural locality (a selo) and the administrative center of Akshinsky District of Zabaykalsky Krai, Russia, located at the confluence of the Aksha and Onon Rivers, 169 kilometers (105 mi) south of Chita. Population: 3,941 (2010 census); 4,129 (2002 census); 4,637 (1989 Soviet census).

== History ==
It was founded in 1750 as a Cossack frontier fort to prevent penetration of the Chinese into the Russian territory. Since then it was used as a prison and many famous political criminals were sent there. In 1872, it was granted town status, but was demoted to a rural locality after the October Revolution. The prison was also abolished after the Revolution.

== Climate ==
Aksha has a hemiboreal humid continental climate (Köppen climate classification Dwb), with severely cold winters and very warm summers. Precipitation is quite low, but is much higher in summer than at other times of the year. On 21 July 2004, the locality set the high temperature record for Asian Russia at 41.7 °C (107.1 °F), which stood until 2010.

Climate data for Aksha
Month	Jan	Feb	Mar	Apr	May	Jun	Jul	Aug	Sep	Oct	Nov	Dec	Year
Record high °C (°F)	1.5 (34.7)	8.4 (47.1)	19.1 (66.4)	29.4 (84.9)	34.6 (94.3)	39.8 (103.6)	41.7 (107.1)	37.2 (99.0)	34.1 (93.4)	26.3 (79.3)	14.6 (58.3)	5.3 (41.5)	41.7 (107.1)
Mean daily maximum °C (°F)	−15.9 (3.4)	−10.9 (12.4)	−0.1 (31.8)	10.5 (50.9)	19.6 (67.3)	25.5 (77.9)	26.8 (80.2)	24.7 (76.5)	17.9 (64.2)	8.7 (47.7)	−4.1 (24.6)	−13.5 (7.7)	7.4 (45.4)
Daily mean °C (°F)	−22.9 (−9.2)	−19.2 (−2.6)	−8.3 (17.1)	2.9 (37.2)	11.4 (52.5)	17.9 (64.2)	20.4 (68.7)	18.2 (64.8)	10.8 (51.4)	1.7 (35.1)	−10.6 (12.9)	−19.7 (−3.5)	0.2 (32.4)
Mean daily minimum °C (°F)	−29.8 (−21.6)	−27.4 (−17.3)	−16.4 (2.5)	−4.7 (23.5)	3.2 (37.8)	10.3 (50.5)	14.0 (57.2)	11.8 (53.2)	3.8 (38.8)	−5.2 (22.6)	−17.1 (1.2)	−25.9 (−14.6)	−6.9 (19.5)
Record low °C (°F)	−47.2 (−53.0)	−50.1 (−58.2)	−40 (−40)	−29.7 (−21.5)	−16.9 (1.6)	−7.2 (19.0)	−0.8 (30.6)	−2.2 (28.0)	−10 (14)	−26 (−15)	−39.9 (−39.8)	−46.4 (−51.5)	−50.1 (−58.2)
Average precipitation mm (inches)	5.3 (0.21)	7.3 (0.29)	7.6 (0.30)	15.4 (0.61)	27.0 (1.06)	56.6 (2.23)	108.2 (4.26)	84.8 (3.34)	42.4 (1.67)	16.9 (0.67)	5.3 (0.21)	8.2 (0.32)	385.0 (15.16)
Average relative humidity (%)	74.3	68.5	59.2	48.7	46.9	56.1	65.1	67.7	61.2	59.9	68.8	75.6	62.7
Source 1: climatebase.ru (1948-2011)
Source 2: climate-data.org (temperatures 1981-2010)
