= Kyrinsky District =

Kyrinsky District Кыринский район (Russian)
- District
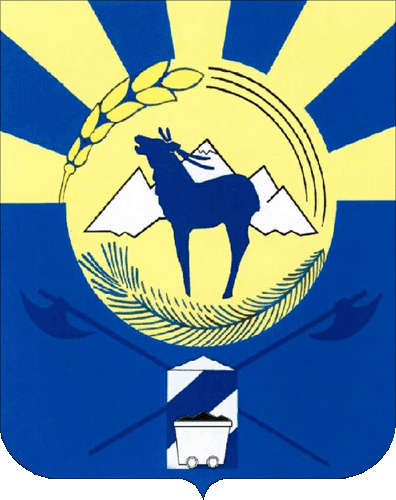
- Coat of arms
- Location of Kyrinsky District in Zabaykalsky Krai
- Coordinates: 49.630°N 111.467°E
- Country: Russia
- Federal subject: Zabaykalsky Krai
- Established: January 4, 1926
- Administrative center: Kyra

Area
  - Total: 16,200 km^{2} (6,300 sq mi)

Population (2010 Census)
  - Total: 13,650
  - Estimate (2018): 12,457 (−8.7%)
  - Density: 0.843/km^{2} (2.18/sq mi)
  - Urban: 0%
  - Rural: 100%

Administrative structure
  - Inhabited localities: 21 rural localities

Municipal structure
  - Municipally incorporated as: Kyrinsky Municipal District
  - Municipal divisions: 0 urban settlements, 14 rural settlements
- Time zone: UTC+9 (MSK+6)
- OKTMO ID: 76624000
- Website: http://xn--80ats7b.xn--80aaaac8algcbgbck3fl0q.xn--p1ai/

Kyrinsky District (Russian: Кыринский райо́н) is an administrative and municipal district (raion), one of the thirty-one in Zabaykalsky Krai, Russia. It is located in the southwest of the krai, and borders with Ulyotovsky District in the north. The area of the district is 16,200 square kilometers (6,300 sq mi). Its administrative center is the rural locality (a selo) of Kyra. Population: 13,650 (2010 census); 16,016 (2002 Census); 19,593 (1989 Soviet census). The population of Kyra accounts for 33.4% of the district's total population.

== Geography ==
The Khentei-Daur Highlands are located in the eastern part of the district.

== History ==
The district was established on January 4, 1926.
