= Suntar (rural locality) =

Suntar Сунтар
- Selo

Other transcription(s)
  - Sakha: Сунтаар
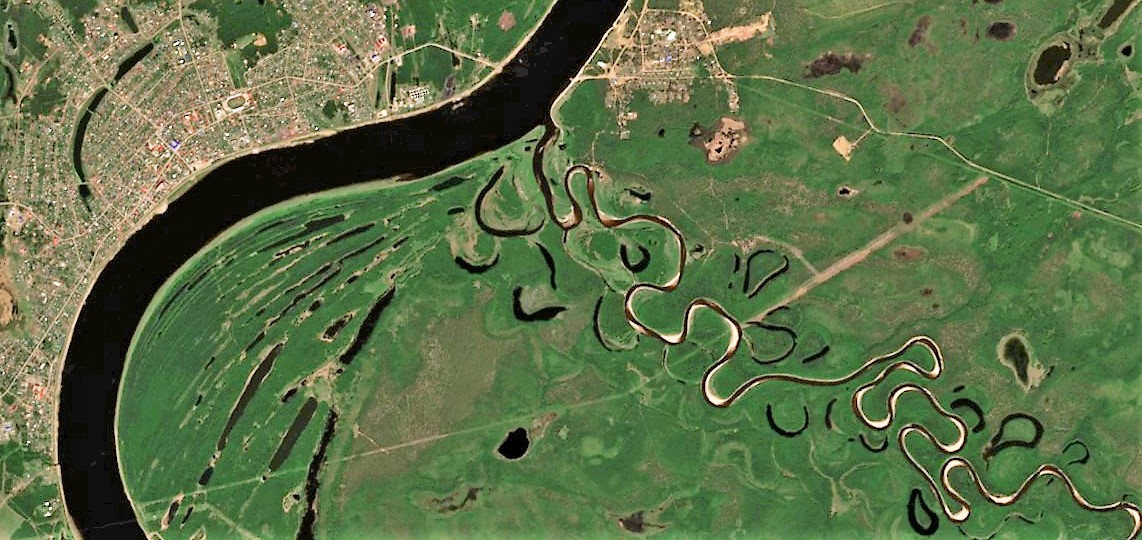

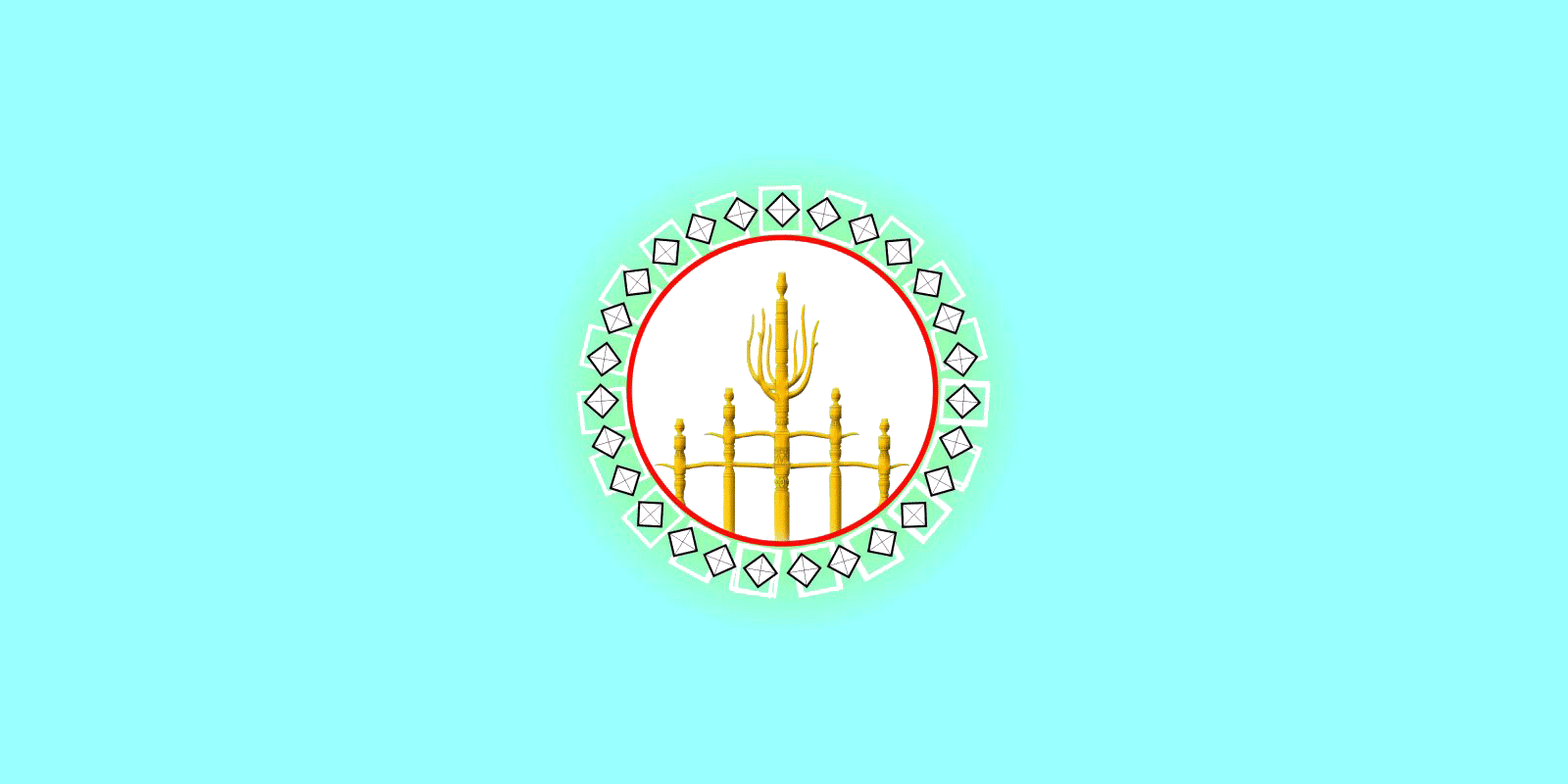
- Flag
- Interactive map of Suntar
- Location of Suntar Suntar (Sakha Republic)
- Coordinates: 62°10′N 117°38′E
- Country: Russia
- Federal subject: Sakha Republic
- Administrative district: Suntarsky District
- Founded: 1764
- Elevation: 124 m (407 ft)

Population (2010 Census)
  - Total: 10,034
  - Estimate (2021): 10,035 (+0%)

Administrative status
  - Capital of: Suntarsky District
- Time zone: UTC+
- Postal code: 678290
- OKTMO ID: 98648455101

Suntar (Russian: Сунта́р; Yakut: Сунтаар, Suntaar) is a rural locality (a selo) and the administrative center of Suntarsky District in the Sakha Republic, Russia, located on the Vilyuy River. Population: 10,034 (2010 census); 8,930 (2002 census); 6,707 (1989 Soviet census).

== Geography ==
Suntar is located by the left bank of the Vilyuy, west of the mouth of the Kempendyay, one of its tributaries.

== Transportation ==
It is served by the Suntar Airport.

== Climate ==
Suntar has a subarctic climate (Köppen climate classification Dfc), with long, bitterly cold winters and short but warm summers. Precipitation is low but is significantly higher in summer than at other times of the year.

Climate data for Suntar
Month	Jan	Feb	Mar	Apr	May	Jun	Jul	Aug	Sep	Oct	Nov	Dec	Year
Record high °C (°F)	−1.0 (30.2)	2.1 (35.8)	11.7 (53.1)	19.7 (67.5)	32.3 (90.1)	36.4 (97.5)	37.8 (100.0)	35.4 (95.7)	28.1 (82.6)	19.5 (67.1)	6.0 (42.8)	−0.9 (30.4)	37.8 (100.0)
Mean daily maximum °C (°F)	−26.5 (−15.7)	−20.5 (−4.9)	−7.9 (17.8)	3.5 (38.3)	13.5 (56.3)	23.2 (73.8)	25.6 (78.1)	21.6 (70.9)	11.7 (53.1)	−1.2 (29.8)	−17.5 (0.5)	−27.2 (−17.0)	−0.1 (31.8)
Daily mean °C (°F)	−31.0 (−23.8)	−27.1 (−16.8)	−16.4 (2.5)	−3.4 (25.9)	7.0 (44.6)	16.1 (61.0)	18.7 (65.7)	14.7 (58.5)	5.9 (42.6)	−5.4 (22.3)	−22.2 (−8.0)	−31.4 (−24.5)	−6.2 (20.8)
Mean daily minimum °C (°F)	−35.4 (−31.7)	−32.9 (−27.2)	−24.5 (−12.1)	−10.9 (12.4)	0.6 (33.1)	9.2 (48.6)	12.2 (54.0)	8.6 (47.5)	1.2 (34.2)	−9.3 (15.3)	−26.7 (−16.1)	−35.6 (−32.1)	−12.0 (10.5)
Record low °C (°F)	−60.2 (−76.4)	−59.4 (−74.9)	−51.8 (−61.2)	−41.4 (−42.5)	−19.7 (−3.5)	−5.5 (22.1)	−2.5 (27.5)	−6.5 (20.3)	−17.8 (0.0)	−41.0 (−41.8)	−53.8 (−64.8)	−58.7 (−73.7)	−60.2 (−76.4)
Average precipitation mm (inches)	15 (0.6)	10 (0.4)	10 (0.4)	11 (0.4)	33 (1.3)	42 (1.7)	52 (2.0)	41 (1.6)	31 (1.2)	23 (0.9)	21 (0.8)	15 (0.6)	304 (11.9)
Average precipitation days (≥ 0.1 mm)	19.4	16.7	11.6	10.4	9.2	9.3	8.4	10.0	13.0	19.5	21.8	19.3	168.6
Average relative humidity (%)	82.5	80.6	73.1	63.7	59.0	66.7	71.9	77.7	77.0	81.8	85.2	82.2	75.1
Mean monthly sunshine hours	35.7	119.0	224.8	255.0	272.8	315.0	319.3	246.5	153.0	93.0	55.5	14.0	2,103.6
Source: climatebase.ru
