= List of economic zones and macrozones of Russia =

Economic zones (Russian: экономи́ческие зо́ны), or macrozones (ма́крозо́ны), group economic regions of Russia into territories that share common economic trends. Economic regions or their parts may belong to more than one economic zone.

== List and composition of economic zones and macrozones ==
1. Baikal Amur Mainline economic zone (экономическая зона Байкало-Амурской магистрали, ekonomicheskaya zona Baykalo-Amurskoy magistrali)
  1. Amur Oblast (partially)
    1. Mazanovsky District
    2. Selemdzhinsky District
    3. town of Tynda
    4. Tyndinsky District
    5. town of Zeya
    6. Zeysky District
  2. Buryat Republic (partially)
    1. Bauntovsky District
    2. Severo-Baykalsky District
    3. town of Severobaykalsk
  3. Chita Oblast (partially)
    1. Kalarsky District
  4. Irkutsk Oblast (partially)
    1. town of Bodaybo
    2. Bodaybinsky District
    3. Kazachinsko-Lensky District
    4. Kirensky District
    5. Mamsko-Chuysky District
    6. town of Ust-Kut
    7. Zhigalovsky District
  5. Khabarovsk Krai (partially)
    1. town of Amursk
    2. city of Komsomolsk-on-Amur
    3. Komsomolsky District
    4. Solnechny District
    5. Sovetsko-Gavansky District
    6. Vaninsky District
    7. Verkhnebureinsky District
  6. Sakha Republic (partially)
    1. Aldansky Ulus
    2. settlement of Berkakit
    3. settlement of Chulman
    4. settlement of Khani
    5. settlement of Nagorny
    6. town of Neryungri
    7. Olyokminsky Ulus
    8. settlement of Serebryany Bor
    9. settlement of Zolotinka
2. Central-Northern economic zone (Центрально-Северная экономическая зона, Tsentralno-Severnaya ekonomicheskaya zona)
  1. Central economic region
  2. Kaliningrad Oblast
  3. Northern economic region
  4. Northwestern economic region
  5. Volga-Vyatka economic region
3. East Russia economic zone (Восточно-Российская экономическая зона, Vostochno-Rossiyskaya ekonomicheskaya zona)
  1. East Siberian economic region
  2. Far Eastern economic region
  3. Urals economic region
  4. West Siberian economic region
4. European Russia economic zone (экономическая зона Европейской России, ekonomicheskaya zona Yevropeyskoy Rossii)
  1. Central economic region
  2. Central-Chernozemic economic region
  3. Kaliningrad Oblast
  4. North Caucasus economic region
  5. Northern economic region
  6. Northwestern economic region
  7. Povolzhye economic region
  8. Volga-Vyatka economic region
5. European Russia and Urals economic macrozone (экономическая макрозона Европейской России и Урала, ekonomicheskaya makrozona Yevropeyskoy Rossii i Urala)
  1. Central economic region
  2. Central-Chernozemic economic region
  3. Kaliningrad Oblast
  4. North Caucasus economic region
  5. Northern economic region
  6. Northwestern economic region
  7. Povolzhye economic region
  8. Urals economic region
  9. Volga-Vyatka economic region
6. Non-Chernozemic economic zone (Нечернозёмная экономическая зона, Nechernozyomnaya ekonomicheskaya zona)
  1. Central economic region
  2. Kaliningrad Oblast
  3. Northern economic region
  4. Northwestern economic region
  5. Perm Krai
  6. Sverdlovsk Oblast
  7. Udmurt Republic
  8. Volga-Vyatka economic region
7. Siberian economic zone (Сибирская экономическая зона, Sibirskaya ekonomicheskaya zona)
  1. East Siberian economic region
  2. West Siberian economic region
8. South Russia economic zone (Южно-Российская экономическая зона, Yuzhno-Rossiyskaya ekonomicheskaya zona)
  1. Central-Chernozemic economic region
  2. North Caucasus economic region
9. Trans-Ural economic macrozone (экономическая макрозона Зауральской России, ekonomicheskaya makrozona Zauralskoy Rossii)
  1. East Siberian economic region
  2. Far Eastern economic region
  3. West Siberian economic region
10. Volga-Urals economic zone (Волго-Уральская экономическая зона, Volgo-Uralskaya ekonomicheskaya zona)
  1. Povolzhye economic region
  2. Urals economic region

== See also ==
- Economic regions of Russia
