= Iyengra =

Rural locality in Sakha Republic, Russia

Iyengra Иенгра
- Selo
- Interactive map of Iyengra
- Location of Iyengra Iyengra (Sakha Republic)
- Coordinates: 56°14′N 124°51′E
- Country: Russia
- Federal subject: Sakha Republic
- Administrative district: Neryungrinsky District
- Rural okrugSelsoviet: Iyengrinsky Rural Okrug
- Founded: 1926
- Elevation: 851 m (2,792 ft)

Population (2010 Census)
  - Total: 1,104
  - Estimate (2023): 1,044 (−5.4%)

Administrative status
  - Capital of: Iyengrinsky Rural Okrug

Municipal status
  - Municipal district: Neryungrinsky Municipal District
  - Rural settlement: Iyengra Rural Settlement
  - Capital of: Iyengra Rural Settlement
- Time zone: UTC+
- Postal code: 678996
- OKTMO ID: 98660405101

Iyengra (Russian: Иенгра; Yakut: Иенҥэ, İenŋe) is a rural locality (a selo), the only inhabited locality, and the administrative center of Iyengrinsky Rural Okrug of Neryungrinsky District in the Sakha Republic, Russia, located on the Iyengra River, 65 kilometers (40 mi) from Neryungri, the administrative center of the district. Its population as of the 2010 Census was 1,104, down from 1,216 recorded during the 2002 Census.

== History ==
It was founded in 1926 and named after the river on which it is located. The river's name derives from an Evenk word meaning horn, referring to the river's branches reputedly resembling the antlers of a deer when seen from the local hills.

== Demographics ==
The population is mainly ethnic Evenks, with 856 of the 1,104 inhabitants reporting as Evenks during the 2010 Census.

== Economy and transportation ==
The local economy is mainly based around reindeer herding, fishing, hunting, and fur farming.

The Amur–Yakutsk Mainline railway passes nearby, with a station in Zolotinka.
