= Toko-Stanovik =

Mountain range in Russia

- Токинский Становик
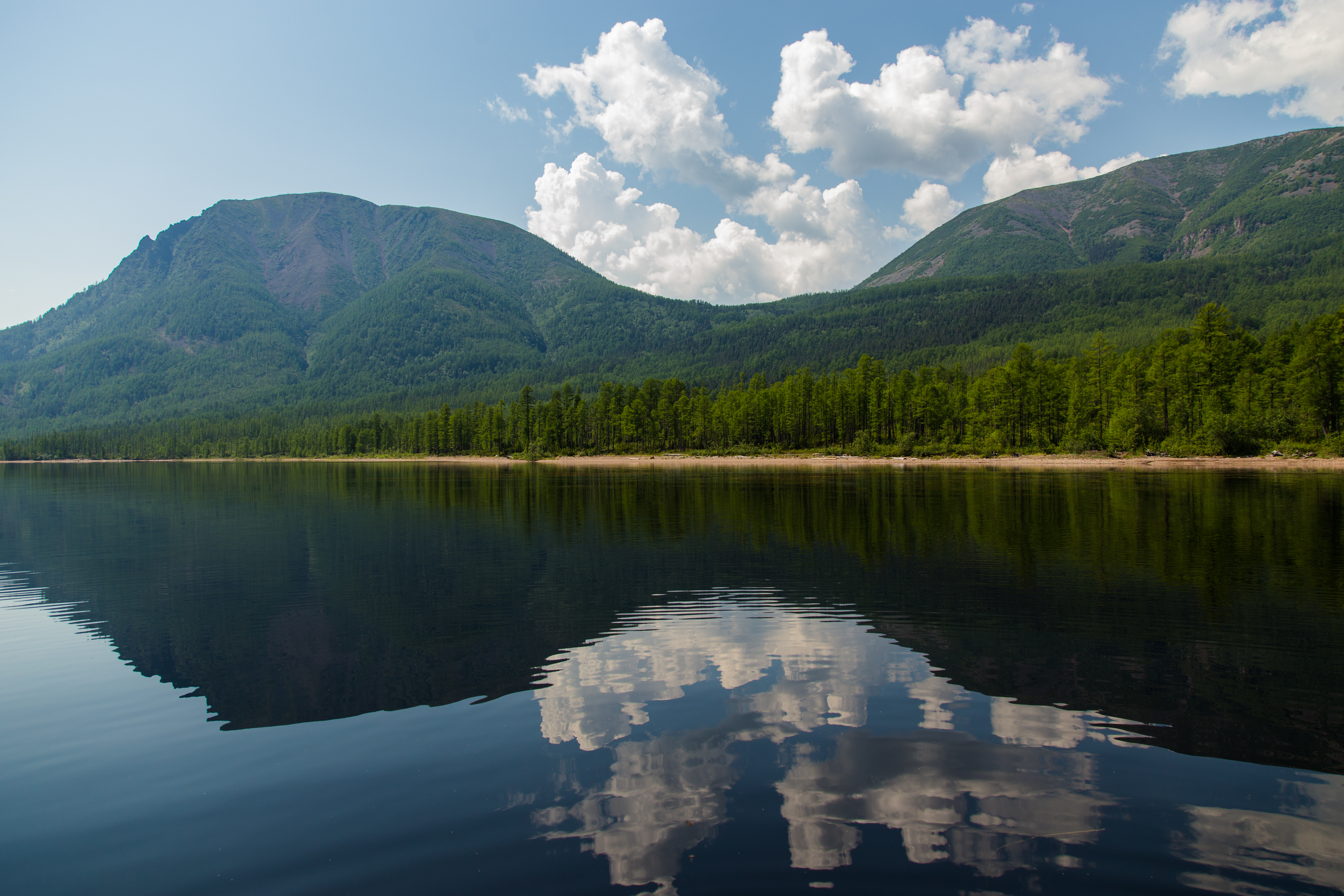
- View of the Bolshoye Toko, which gives its name to the range

Highest point
- Peak: Unnamed
- Elevation: 2,380 m (7,810 ft)
- Listing: List of ultras of Northeast Asia
- Coordinates: 55°53′50″N 130°27′13″E

Dimensions
- Length: 200 km (120 mi) E/W

Geography
- Location within Far Eastern Federal District
- Location: Sakha Republic, Amur Oblast, Khabarovsk Krai, Russian Far East
- Range coordinates: 55°40′N 131°0′E
- Parent range: Stanovoy Range; South Siberian Mountains

Geology
- Orogeny: Alpine orogeny
- Rock age: Archean - Proterozoic
- Rock type(s): Crystalline schist and gneiss with granite intrusions

Climbing
- Easiest route: From Neryungri or Zeya

The Toko-Stanovik (Russian: Токинский Становик, Tokinsky Stanovik) is a range of mountains in the Russian Far East. Administratively it belongs partly to Amur Oblast, the Sakha Republic (Yakutia) and Khabarovsk Krai of the Russian Federation.

The nearest airport is Neryungri Airport.

== Geography ==
The Toko-Stanovik is a subrange of the Stanovoy Range located in the eastern part. The range runs in a roughly east/west direction for about 200 kilometres (120 mi) at the northeastern end of Amur Oblast and the western limit of Khabarovsk Krai, bordering with Yakutia (Sakha) to the north. The highest point is a 2,380 metres (7,810 ft) high ultra-prominent peak. There are two small subranges: the Dzhugdyr Range, with the sources of the Argi, stretches southeastwards from its central part, and the Atagsky Range, stretches southeastwards to the east, in the area of the sources of the Maya.

River Zeya has its sources in the southern slopes of the range. On the northern side originate several rivers of the Uchur basin, such as the Algama, Mulam and Tyrkan, as well as the sources of Bolshoye Toko. This lake, which gives its name to the range, is located at the feet of the northern slopes of the Toko-Stanovik in the Aldan Highlands.

== Flora ==
The slopes of the range are covered by taiga, mainly consisting of larch, with dwarf cedar above 1,300 metres (4,300 ft).

== See also ==
- List of mountains and hills of Russia
- List of ultras of Northeast Asia
- Neryungrinsky District
- Zeysky District
