= Khani =

== Populated places ==
Khani (Russian: Хани) is the name of several inhabited localities in Russia.

Urban localities

- Khani, Sakha Republic, an urban-type settlement in Neryungrinsky District of the Sakha Republic

Rural localities

- Khani, Novgorod Oblast, a village in Yamnikskoye Settlement of Demyansky District in Novgorod Oblast

== Other ==
- Khani (river), a left tributary of the Olyokma
- Khani (letter), letter of the Georgian alphabet.
