= Nagorny, Sakha Republic =

Nagorny Нагорный
- Urban-type settlement

Other transcription(s)
  - Yakut: Нагорнай
- Interactive map of Nagorny
- Location of Nagorny Nagorny (Sakha Republic)
- Coordinates: 55°57′N 124°55′E
- Country: Russia
- Federal subject: Sakha Republic
- Administrative district: Neryungrinsky District
- SettlementSelsoviet: Settlement of Nagorny
- Founded: 1920s
- Urban-type settlement status since: 1941

Population (2010 Census)
  - Total: 68
  - Estimate (1959, 1970, 1979, 1989, 2002, 2009, 2010, 2012, 2013, 2014, 2015, 2016, 2017, 2018, 2019): 662 441 3,184 913 152 96 68 60 32 22 19 17 15 14 9

Administrative status
  - Capital of: Settlement of Nagorny

Municipal status
  - Municipal district: Neryungrinsky Municipal District
  - Urban settlement: Zolotinka Urban Settlement
- Time zone: UTC+9 (MSK+6)
- Postal code: 678994
- OKTMO ID: 98660154056

Nagorny population
- 2010 Census: 68
- 2002 Census: 152
- 1989 Census: 913
- 1979 Census: 3,184

Nagorny (Russian: Наго́рный; Yakut: Нагорнай) is an urban locality (an urban-type settlement) in Neryungrinsky District of the Sakha Republic, Russia, located 100 kilometers (62 mi) from Neryungri, the administrative center of the district, on the right bank of the Timpton River on the northern flank of the Stanovoy Highlands, only 10 kilometers (6.2 mi) from the border with Amur Oblast. As of the 2010 Census, its population was 68.

== History ==
It was founded in the 1920s in conjunction with the construction of the road connecting the Aldan River region and Yakutsk with the Trans-Siberian Railway. In 1927, Nagorny became the administrative center of Timptonsky District and remained the most populous inhabited locality in southern Yakutia into the 1940s. In 1941, it was granted urban-type settlement status, although the district administration was moved to Chulman in 1943.

Nagorny received a second lease of life in the mid-1970s, with the construction of the Baikal–Amur Mainline branch railway from Tynda to Neryungri. A new temporary settlement was created around the settlement's railway station, about 5 kilometers (3.1 mi) to the southeast, to house thousands of construction workers.

With the completion of the railway and in the absence of any other economic development, the majority of the local population left again during the 1980s and 1990s. The remaining population is concentrated in the original settlement. Nagorny is planned to be entirely depopulated in the near future.

== Administrative and municipal status ==
Within the framework of administrative divisions, the urban-type settlement of Nagorny is incorporated within Neryungrinsky District as the Settlement of Nagorny. As a municipal division, the territories of the Settlement of Nagorny and the Settlement of Zolotinka are incorporated within Neryungrinsky Municipal District as Zolotinka Urban Settlement.

== Transportation ==
Nagorny is served by the nearby Nagornaya–Yakutskaya railway station on the Amur–Yakutsk Mainline. It is also on the A360 Lena Highway, the main road to Yakutsk.

== Climate ==
Nagorny has a monsoonal subarctic climate (Dwc).

Climate data for Nagorny, Sakha Republic
Month	Jan	Feb	Mar	Apr	May	Jun	Jul	Aug	Sep	Oct	Nov	Dec	Year
Record high °C (°F)	−2.2 (28.0)	−1.9 (28.6)	8.4 (47.1)	15.0 (59.0)	29.0 (84.2)	35.1 (95.2)	35.0 (95.0)	30.9 (87.6)	30.0 (86.0)	16.1 (61.0)	7.0 (44.6)	−2.0 (28.4)	35.1 (95.2)
Mean daily maximum °C (°F)	−24.3 (−11.7)	−20.3 (−4.5)	−10.9 (12.4)	−0.3 (31.5)	10.1 (50.2)	19.2 (66.6)	21.5 (70.7)	18.7 (65.7)	10.2 (50.4)	−2.6 (27.3)	−16.1 (3.0)	−23.7 (−10.7)	−2.2 (28.0)
Daily mean °C (°F)	−28.7 (−19.7)	−25.6 (−14.1)	−17.1 (1.2)	−6.0 (21.2)	4.2 (39.6)	12.3 (54.1)	15.0 (59.0)	12.1 (53.8)	4.2 (39.6)	−8.1 (17.4)	−21.3 (−6.3)	−28.1 (−18.6)	−7.9 (17.8)
Mean daily minimum °C (°F)	−34.0 (−29.2)	−31.9 (−25.4)	−25.0 (−13.0)	−14.2 (6.4)	−3.3 (26.1)	4.1 (39.4)	7.2 (45.0)	4.7 (40.5)	−2.4 (27.7)	−14.9 (5.2)	−27.6 (−17.7)	−33.4 (−28.1)	−14.8 (5.4)
Record low °C (°F)	−51.3 (−60.3)	−51.0 (−59.8)	−45.0 (−49.0)	−31.0 (−23.8)	−19.4 (−2.9)	−6.1 (21.0)	−5.6 (21.9)	−7.0 (19.4)	−16.1 (3.0)	−36.1 (−33.0)	−46.0 (−50.8)	−53.9 (−65.0)	−53.9 (−65.0)
Average precipitation mm (inches)	8.3 (0.33)	6.6 (0.26)	10.6 (0.42)	29.7 (1.17)	49.5 (1.95)	104.1 (4.10)	136.9 (5.39)	122.1 (4.81)	7.8 (0.31)	29.8 (1.17)	14.1 (0.56)	8.6 (0.34)	595.1 (23.43)
Average precipitation days	16.2	14.4	12.5	10.9	14.5	11.8	13.2	12.1	13.1	17.6	17.1	15.8	169.2
