= Aeroflot Flight 4076 =

1990 hijacking incident

- An Aeroflot's Tupolev Tu-154B-2 similar to the one involved

Hijacking
- Date: August 19, 1990
- Summary: Aircraft hijacking
- Site: Neryungri, Russian SFSR; Krasnoyarsk, Russian SFSR; Tashkent, Uzbek SSR; and Karachi, Pakistan

Aircraft
- Aircraft type: Tupolev Tu-154B-2
- Operator: Neryungri OJSC, Aeroflot
- Registration: CCCP-85323
- Flight origin: Chulman Neryungri Airport, Neryungri, Russian SFSR
- Destination: Yakutsk Airport, Yakutsk, Russian SFSR
- Occupants: 92
- Passengers: 85
- Crew: 7
- Fatalities: 0
- Injuries: 0
- Survivors: 92

Aeroflot Flight 4076 was a domestic passenger flight in Russian SFSR from Chulman Airport, Neryungri to Yakutsk Airport, Yakutsk. On August 19, 1990, the Tupolev Tu-154B was hijacked by 15 prisoners and was diverted to Karachi, Pakistan. No one of the 92 occupants were injured.

== Background ==
=== Aircraft ===
The aircraft in question was a Tupolev Tu-154B-2 manufactured in 1979 and registered as CCCP-85323. On February 13, 1979, it was transferred to Aeroflot, East Siberian Civil Aviation Authority unit. On May 18, 1989, the plane was changed to the Neryungri OJSC.

After the hijack, the plane continue flying until 1996 when YakutAviaTrans (now Yakutia Airlines) purchased it for storage. In 2013, it was scrapped.

=== Crew members ===
- Captain: Anatoly Listopadov
- Co-pilot: Sergei Turyev
- Navigator: Alexander Orlovsky
- Flight engineer: Alexey Kamoshin
- Flight attendant: Tatyana Sharfgalieva
- Flight attendant: Natalya Filippenko
- Flight attendant: Sergey Rybnikov

=== Hijackers ===
Out of the 17 hijackers involved, the identified were Vladimir Evdokimov, Sergey Moloshnikov, Vladimir Petrov, Konstantin Shatokhin, Vladimir Boblov, Andrei Isakov, Igor Suslov, Sergei Shubenkov, Maxim Levchenko.

== Hijacking ==
The flight took off from Chulman Airport, Neryungri at 6:25. Ten minutes after takeoff, Tatyana Sharfgalieva saw one of the prisoners holding a sawed-off shotgun, and she activate the alarm while rushing through the cockpit door to hand over the note saying: "Girls! Tell the commander... we'll blow everything up... just don't panic. I'm sorry, but we have no other choice. Better death than this life." Around 5 minutes later, the cockpit was stormed and the hijackers took over, a distress signal was made to the controllers. One of the hijackers was strapped with a fake bomb created prior to the flight.

For 15 prisoners, there were only 3 pairs of handcuff and 3 security guards (Sergei Borshch, Valery Varlyga, and Igor Smurygin). When the hijack began, the security guards had their guns ready. Acknowledging the bomb, they were ordered to lay down the gun, but Sergei Borshch accidentally pulled off the trigger. This cause Alexey Kamoshin who get out the cockpit to negotiate to panic as he was needed for an emegency landing; however, one of the prisoner confirmed that the rifles were blank so there weren't any decompression.

At 8:10, the plane returned to Neryungri. At there, the hijackers demanded weapons, radio and parachutes, as well as boarding Sergey Moloshnikov and Vladimir Petrov (who had not appeared in the first flight) - all were met except the parachutes after dissuading the hijackers. In exchange, the three guards, and all women and children were released. After six prisoners choose to leave due to their short-term prison time or suspended sentences, the plane at that moment consisted of eleven prisoners, twenty-nine male passengers and the seven crew members. The reason authorities decided not to storm the plane was that the hijackers had no intention of killing people and they don't want to risk the passengers' lives.

At 13:00, they departed. Initially, the hijackers wanted to go to Novosibirsk, but they changed their mind and diverted to Krasnoyarsk at 15:45. After refuelling, at 17:25, the plane flew again to Tashkent and landed at 20:45 for another refuelling as well as two other individual (a navigator and a radio operator).

Then, on August 20, Karachi was their final destination. As they entered the Pakistani airspace, the Pakistani authority sent fighter jets in order to shoot them down at any moment. The plane circled over the city's airport for over an hour and a half while local authorities refused to permit the plane to land. Only when they knew that the plane was running low on fuel did they let the plane land. On August 22, the hostages returned home.

== Aftermath ==
The trial was held in the early 1992 and they were sentence to life imprisonment, but then lowered to fourteen years.

The Pakistani prison were deemed extreme to the point where the hijackers begged the Soviet Union for mercy to go home. In 1990, Igor Suslov suicide by hanging and for the years go on, many of them attempted suicide.

In 1998, in honor of the 50th anniversary of Pakistan's independence, six of them were extradited to Russia; three died in Pakistani prisons (two commit suicide and one had a heart attack) and two were sent back to Ukraine in the 2000s.

== In popular culture ==
In 2007, the hijack was adapted to the episode "Air Prison" from the Russian series "Следствие вели…"

== See also ==
- Aeroflot Flight 3739 (1988)
- Aeroflot Flight 101/435
