= Bolshoy Khatymi =

Bolshoy Khatymi Большой Хатыми
- Selo
- Interactive map of Bolshoy Khatymi
- Location of Bolshoy Khatymi Bolshoy Khatymi (Sakha Republic)
- Coordinates: 57°22′48″N 124°54′31″E
- Country: Russia
- Federal subject: Sakha Republic
- Administrative district: Neryungrinsky District
- Rural okrugSelsoviet: Chulman Urban Okrug

Population (2010 Census)
  - Total: 311
  - Estimate (2023): 218 (−29.9%)

Municipal status
  - Municipal district: Neryungrinsky Municipal District
  - Rural settlement: Chulman Urban Settlement
- Time zone: UTC+
- Postal code: 678988
- OKTMO ID: 98660165106

Bolshoy Khatymi (Russian: Большой Хатыми; Yakut: Улахан Хатыми, Ulaxan Xatımi) is a rural locality (a selo), one of two settlements, in addition to Chulman, in Chulman Urban Okrug of Neryungrinsky District in the Sakha Republic, Russia. It is located 99 kilometers (62 mi) from Neryungri, the administrative center of the district. Its population as of the 2010 Census was 311, of whom 156 were male and 155 female, down from 506 as recorded during the 2002 Census.
