= Zolotinka Urban Settlement =

Coordinates: 56°N 125°E

Zolotinka Urban Settlement (Russian: городско́е поселе́ние «посёлок Золотинка») is a municipal formation (an urban settlement) in Neryungrinsky Municipal District of the Sakha Republic, Russia, one of the six urban settlements in the district. Its territory comprises the territories of two administrative divisions of Neryungrinsky District—the Settlement of Zolotinka and the Settlement of Nagorny. The area of the urban settlement is 1.9 square kilometers (0.73 sq mi).
