= Yakutian Railway =

Russian railway operator

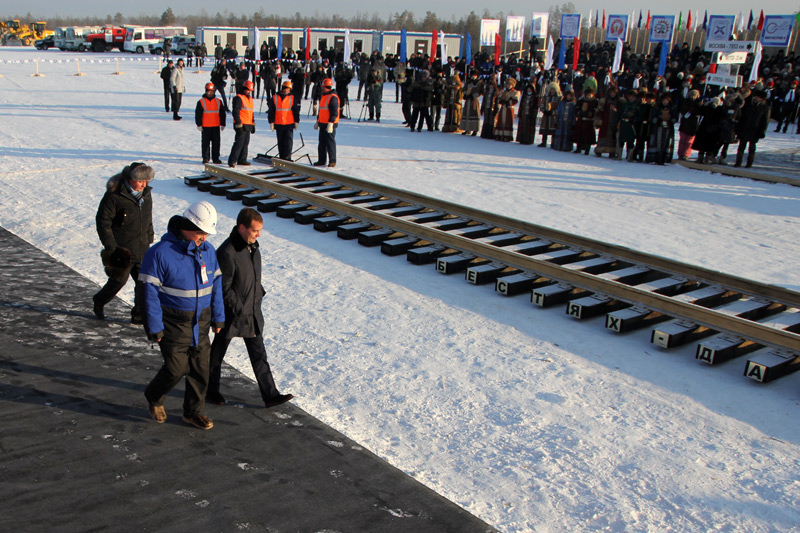
- Dmitry Medvedev on the opening of the railway in 2011.
- Type: Joint-stock company
- Industry: Rail transport
- Headquarters: Aldan, Russia
- Revenue: $53.4 million (2017)
- Operating income: $2.56 million (2017)
- Net income: $1.54 million (2017)
- Total assets: $479 million (2017)
- Total equity: $403 million (2017)

Yakutian Railway (Russian: Железные дороги Якутии) is a rail operator in the Republic of Yakutia in Russia.

The trins runs through roughly 900 km of permafrost terrain in Easters Russia connecting the Trans-Siberian and Baikal-Amur networks.

== Ownership ==
Owners as of September 2018:

- Russian Railways (49.9%)
- Ministry of Property and Land Relations of Yakutia (44.9%)

== History ==
In 1996, operation began on the Neryungri — Aldan section.

In 2002, freight traffic was opened on the site Neryungri — Tommot. Regular passenger service here was opened in 2004.

In 2006, after the visit of Russian president Vladimir Putin in Yakutia, an agreement was signed "On the implementation of activities on organization of cargo transportation in freight cars and containers in direct communication". Thereby, Yakutian Railway was officially recognized as the railway infrastructure of common use.

In 2007, 50% of the shares belonging to the Russian Federation, were transferred to the ownership of Russian Railways. In the same year the specialists of the company, together with the Federal tariff service was developed by the tariff guide for freight infrastructure Neryungri — Tommot.

In 2009, work on the Tommot — Amga section was initiated.

In 2010, the stacking "Silver link" at the station Kerdem was produced.

On November 15, 2011 the laying of the "Golden link" in the line of Berkakit — Tommot — Nizhny Bestyakh took place. The event was attended by President of the Russian Federation Dmitry Medvedev and the head of Russian Railways Vladimir Yakunin. The length of line at the moment is 808 km. It was assumed that a further step in the development of the road will be the construction of a combined road-rail bridge across the Lena river.

In 2017, the line would have reached Yakutsk, after the bridge across Lena River is finished. The headquarters of the railway will move from Aldan to Yakutsk once the line is completed.

== Gallery ==
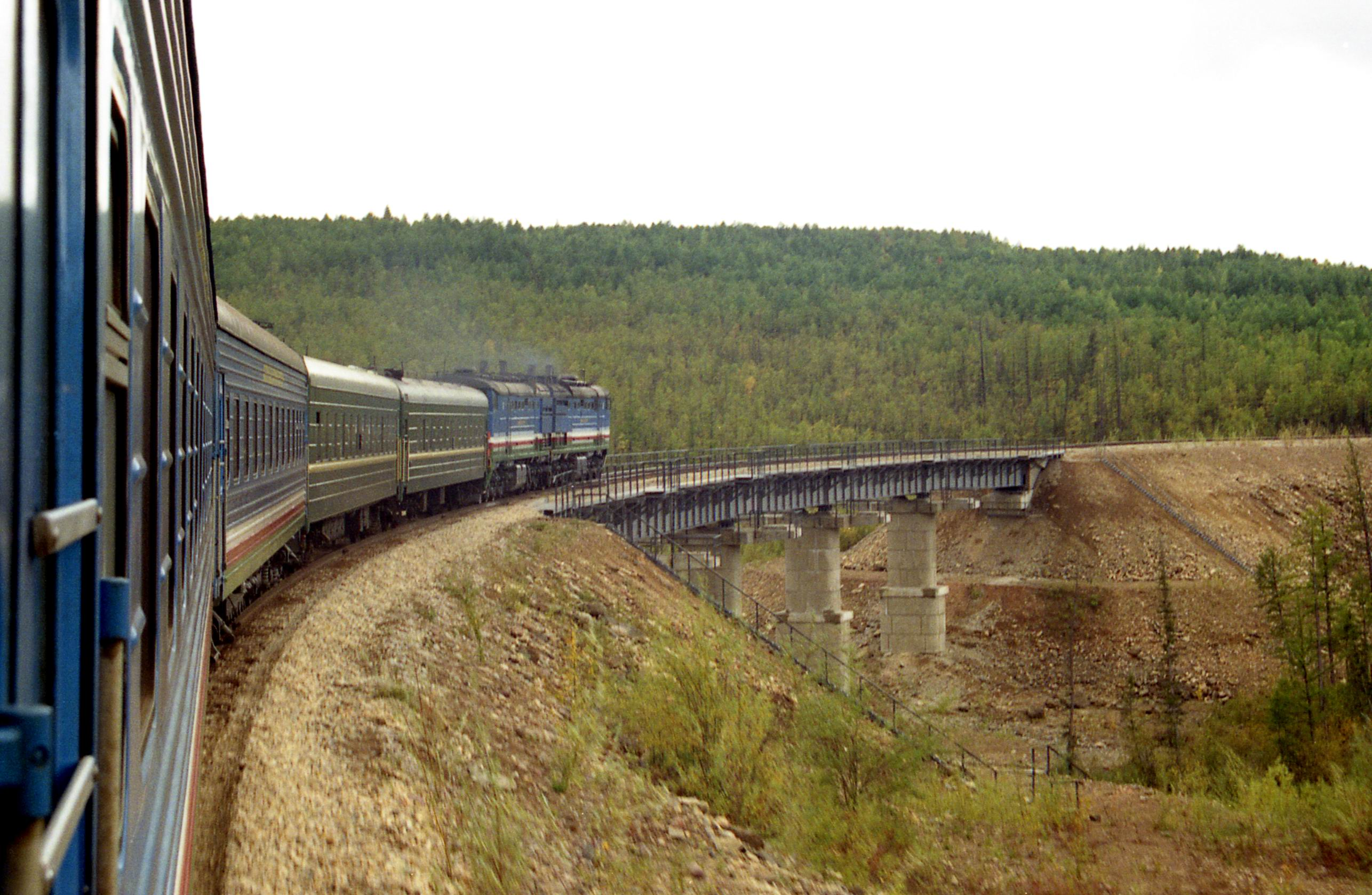
Passenger train № 323 Tommot — Nerungy

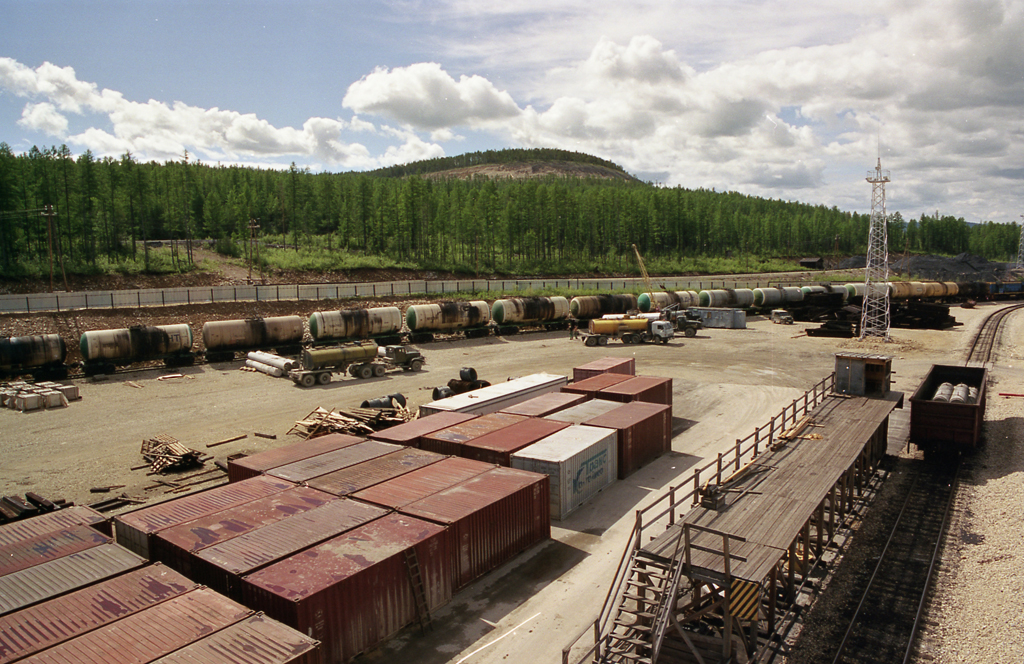
Tommot railway station

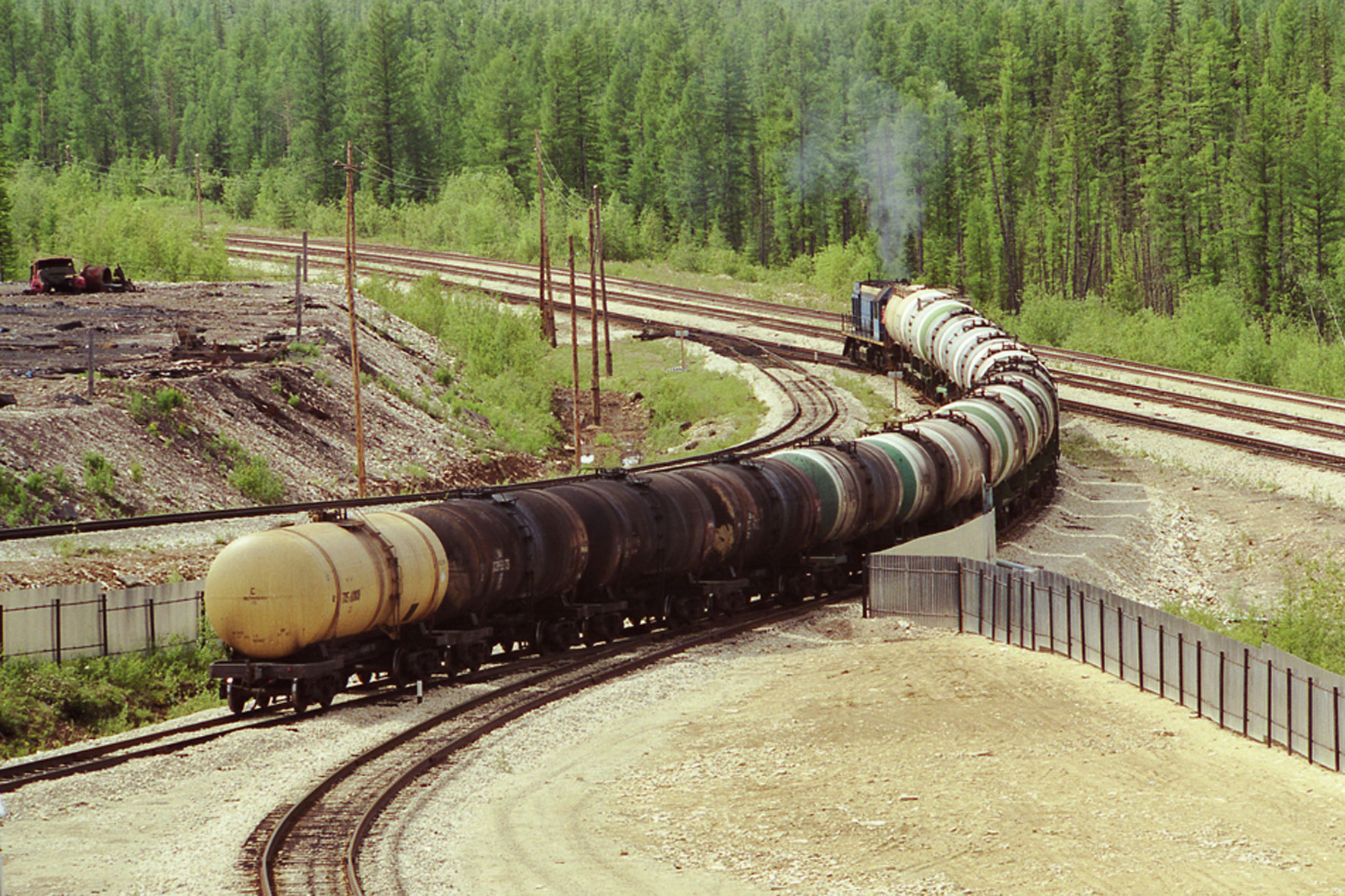
Train on Tommot station

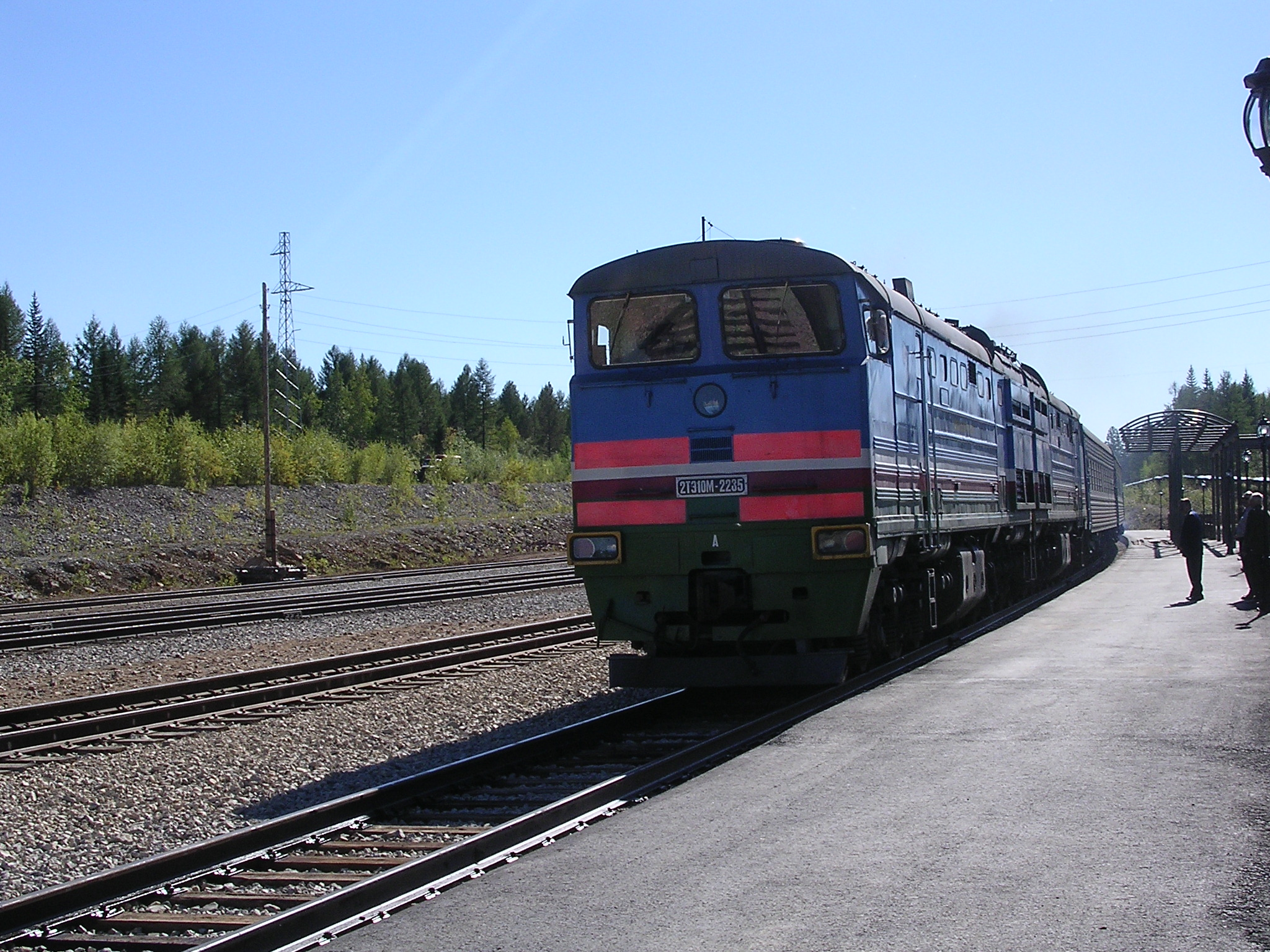
Aldan Railway station

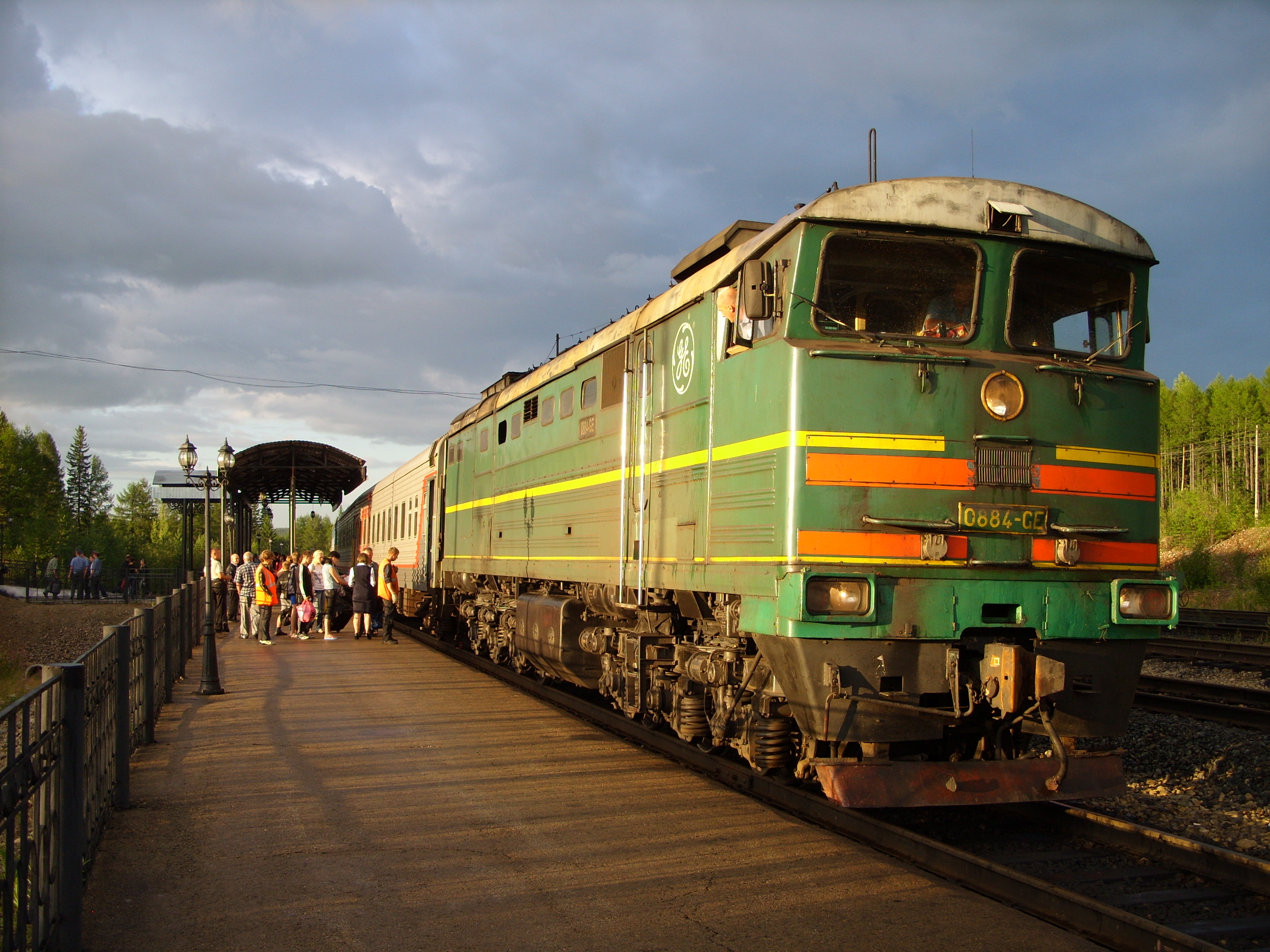
Aldan Railway station

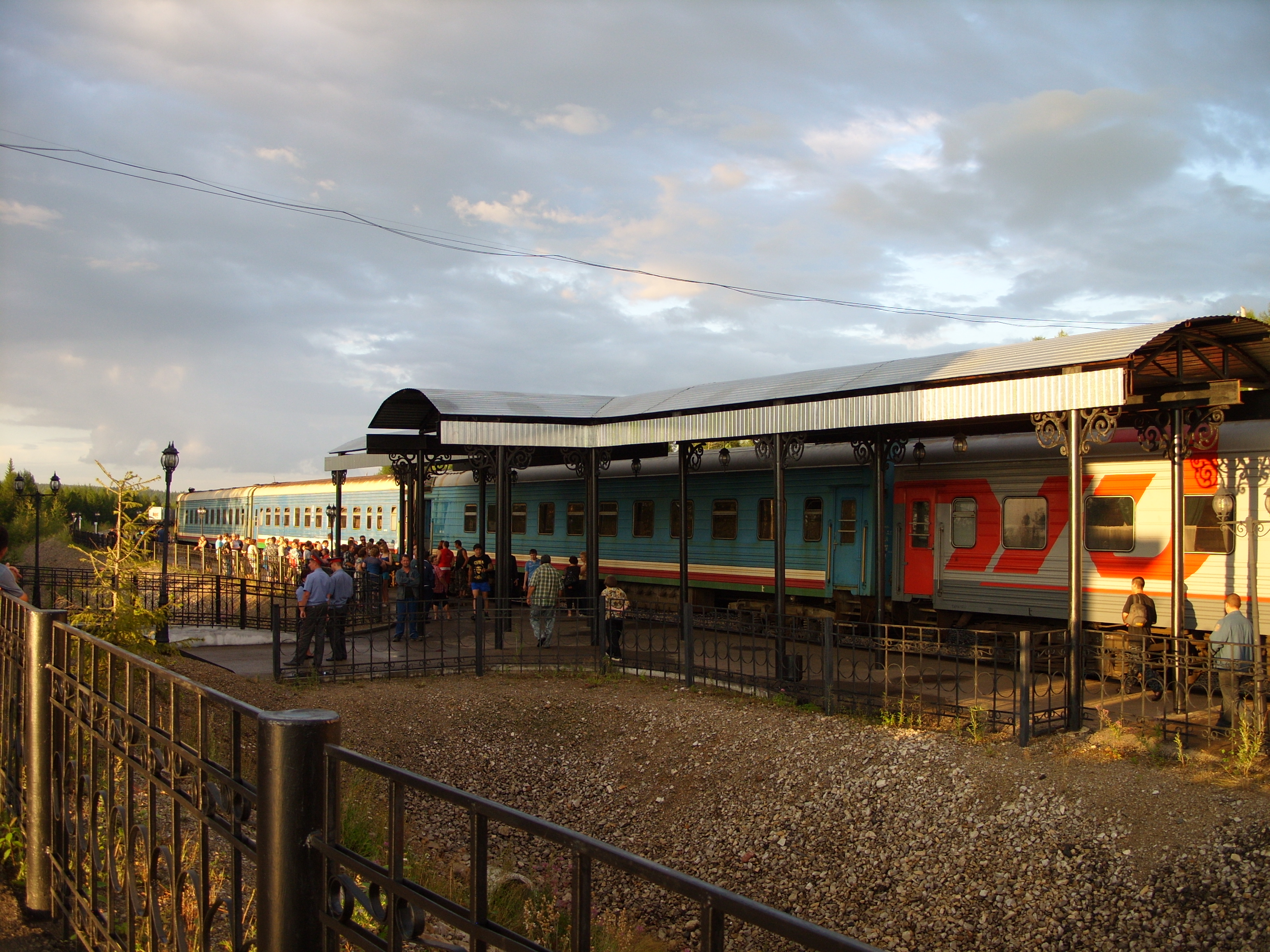
Aldan Railway station
