= Neryungrinskaya Power Plant =

Coal-fired power plant in Neryungrinsky, Sakha, Russia

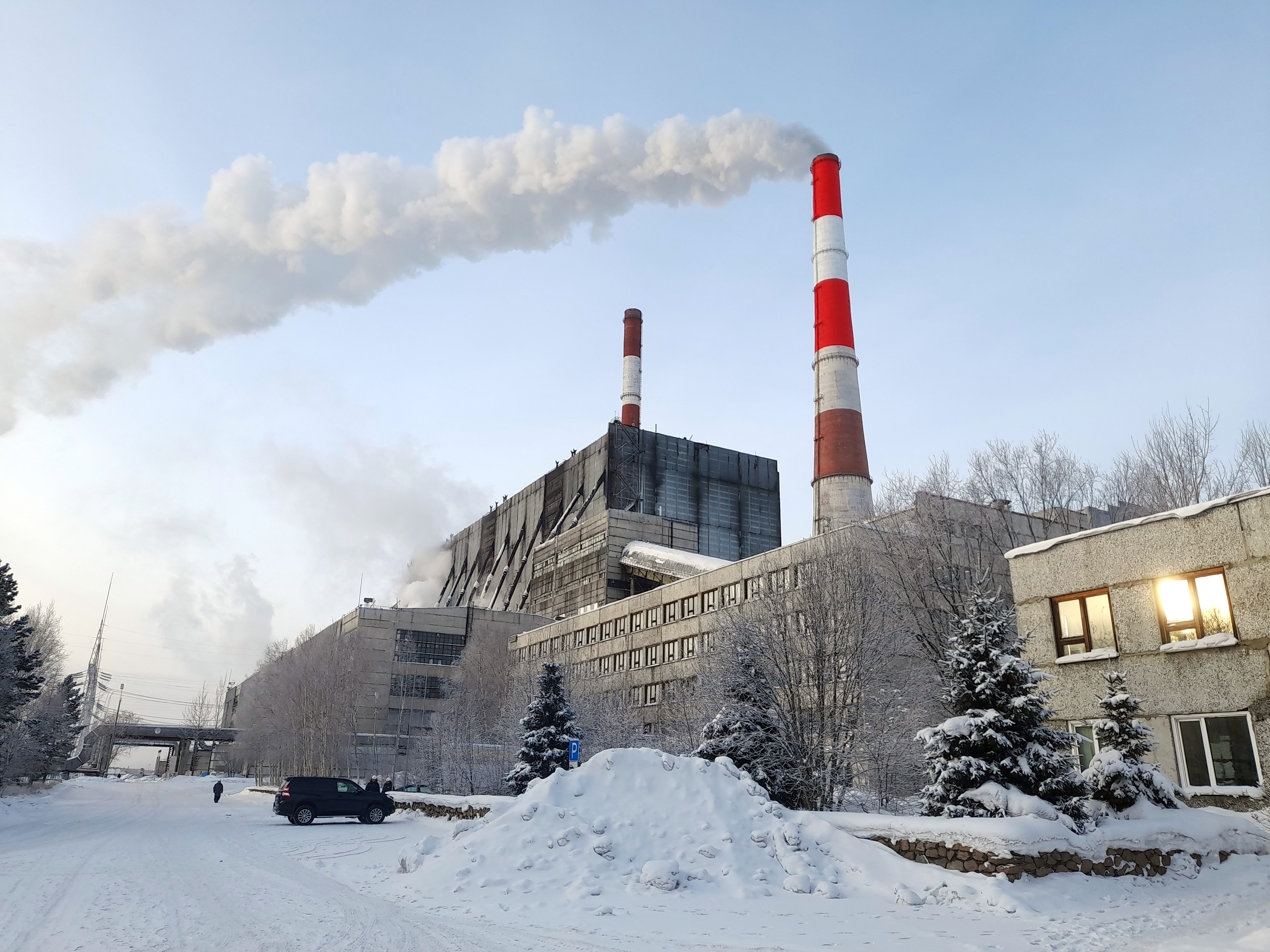
- Official name: Нерюнгринская ГРЭС
- Country: Russia
- Location: Neryungrinsky, Sakha
- Coordinates: 56°40′8.00″N 124°51′11.99″E
- Status: Operational
- Commission date: 1983
- Operator: JSC Far East Generating Company

Thermal power station
- Primary fuel: Coal

Power generation
- Units operational: 3
- Nameplate capacity: 570 MW

External links
- Commons: Related media on Commons

The Neryungrinskaya Power Plant (Russian: Нерюнгринская ГРЭС) is a coal-fired power station in Neryungrinsky District, Sakha Republic, Russia.

== History ==
The power plant was commissioned in 1983.

== Technical specifications ==
The power plant has three generation units with a total installed generation capacity of 57 MW. It is operated by JSC Far East Generating Company.

== See also ==
- List of power stations in Russia
