= South Yakutia HPP =

The South Yakutia Hydroelectric Complex or South Yakutia HPP is a set of proposed hydroelectric plants in the South Yakutia region of the Russian Far East, on rivers including the Uchur, Timpton, Aldan, and Olyokma.

== Overview ==
The complex will be comprise nine plants with a total capacity of over 9,000 MW, and an average annual production of about 40 billion kWh. Construction priority will be given to the Uchurskaya, Sredne-Uchurskaya, Kankunskaya, and Timptonskaya HPP's, which will have a total capacity of 5,002 MW and an annual output of 23.42 billion kWh.

== Sredne-Uchurskaya HPP ==
Located on the River Uchur, a tributary of the Aldan River with a power generation capacity of 3330 MW, and an average annual production of 14.98 billion kWh.

== Uchurskaya HPP ==
Hydroelectric power capacity 365 MW, average annual production 2.19 billion kWh.

== Kankunskaya HPP ==
Power generation capacity of 1060 MW, and an average annual production of 4.77 billion kWh. It will be the first-built dam in the complex.

== Timptonskaya HPP ==
Located on the River Timpton, a tributary of the Aldan River, Timptonskaya will have a power generation capacity of 245 MW and an annual generation of 1.48 billion kWh.

== Olekminsk HPP ==
Located on the Olyokma River, a tributary of the Lena River. Includes Olekminsk; total capacity of 2230 MW.

== Aldan HPP ==
Power capacity of 300 MW, average annual generation of 3.6 billion kWh. Another plant, the Verkhne Aldan, will join this station- total generation capacity is expected to be 1000 MW. Commissioning of these projects is expected in 2015–2020.

== Economic importance ==
The hydroelectric complex should achieve the following objectives:

♦Electricity exports to China, and possibly to South Korea, but only China has expressed interest in buying electric power from Russia.

♦Ensuring a reliable power supply to the Russian Far East oblasts.

♦Ensuring the supply of power to promising mining projects in South Yakutia, especially the Elga coal deposits.

♦Provision of electricity to energy-intensive industries, particularly aluminum smelters.

The cost of construction is estimated at $8 billion, which is less than the Diamer-Bhasha Dam in Pakistan, at $14 billion.
