= Zolotinka =

Zolotinka Золотинка
- Urban-type settlement

Other transcription(s)
  - Yakut: Золотинка
- Interactive map of Zolotinka
- Location of Zolotinka Zolotinka (Sakha Republic)
- Coordinates: 56°31′N 124°51′E
- Country: Russia
- Federal subject: Sakha Republic
- Administrative district: Neryungrinsky District
- SettlementSelsoviet: Settlement of Zolotinka
- Founded: mid-1970s
- Urban-type settlement status since: 1977

Population (2010 Census)
  - Total: 552
  - Estimate (2023): 585 (+6%)

Administrative status
  - Capital of: Settlement of Zolotinka

Municipal status
  - Municipal district: Neryungrinsky Municipal District
  - Urban settlement: Zolotinka Urban Settlement
  - Capital of: Zolotinka Urban Settlement
- Time zone: UTC+9 (MSK+6)
- Postal code: 678997
- OKTMO ID: 98660154051

Zolotinka population
- 2010 Census: 552
- 2002 Census: 566
- 1989 Census: 1,065
- 1979 Census: 5,377

Zolotinka (Russian: Золотинка; Yakut: Золотинка) is an urban locality (an urban-type settlement) in Neryungrinsky District of the Sakha Republic, Russia, located 73 kilometers (45 mi) from Neryungri, the administrative center of the district. It is located south of the Aldan Highlands on the Kholodnikan River, a tributary of the Timpton. As of the 2010 Russian Census, its population was 552.

== Etymology ==
The name "Zolotinka", which translates to gold flake in Russian, refers to the gold reserves found in the area.

== History ==
Zolotinka was founded in the mid-1970s in conjunction with the construction of the railway linking the Baikal–Amur Mainline to the town of Neryungri. Urban-type settlement status was granted to it in 1977. With the completion of the railway, and gold mining activities not as successful as it had been hoped, the majority of inhabitants left during the 1980s.

== Administrative and municipal status ==
Within the framework of administrative divisions, the urban-type settlement of Zolotinka is incorporated within Neryungrinsky District as the Settlement of Zolotinka. As a municipal division, the territories of the Settlement of Zolotinka and the Settlement of Nagorny are incorporated within Neryungrinsky Municipal District as Zolotinka Urban Settlement.

== Transportation ==
Zolotinka has a railway station on the Amur–Yakutsk Mainline.
