= Algama =

- Mouth location in Yakutia, Russia

Location
- Country: Russia

Physical characteristics
- Source
  - location: Toko-Stanovik; Stanovoy Range
  - coordinates: 55°50′55″N 128°55′59″E
- Mouth: Gonam
  - coordinates: 57.3115°N 131.2502°E
- Length: 426 km (265 mi)
- Basin size: 21,500 km^{2} (8,300 sq mi)

Basin features
- Progression: Gonam→ Uchur→ Aldan→ Lena→ Laptev Sea

The Algama (Sakha and Russian: Алгама, also Алгома Algoma) is a river in Sakha Republic and Khabarovsk Krai, Russia. It is a right tributary of the Gonam. It is 426 kilometres (265 mi) long, and has a drainage basin of 21,500 square kilometres (8,300 sq mi).

== See also ==
- List of rivers of Russia
