= Gonam =

River in Russia

- Mouth location in Yakutia, Russia

Location
- Country: Russia

Physical characteristics
- Source
  - coordinates: 55°45′21″N 125°34′35″E
- Mouth: Uchur
  - coordinates: 57.3464°N 131.2822°E
- Length: 686 km (426 mi)
- Basin size: 55,600 km^{2} (21,500 sq mi)

Basin features
- Progression: Uchur→ Aldan→ Lena→ Laptev Sea

The Gonam (Russian: Гонам, Yakut: Гуонаам, Guonaam) is a river in Yakutia in Russia, a left tributary of the Uchur (Lena's basin). The length of the river is 686 kilometres (426 mi). The area of its drainage basin is 55,600 square kilometres (21,500 mi^{2}). Its main tributaries are the Sutam and Algama.

== See also ==
- List of rivers of Russia
