= Serebryany Bor, Sakha Republic =

Serebryany Bor Серебряный Бор
- Urban-type settlement

Other transcription(s)
  - Yakut: Серебряный Бор
- Interactive map of Serebryany Bor
- Location of Serebryany Bor Serebryany Bor (Sakha Republic)
- Coordinates: 56°41′N 124°51′E
- Country: Russia
- Federal subject: Sakha Republic
- Administrative district: Neryungrinsky District
- SettlementSelsoviet: Serebryany Bor
- Founded: 1978
- Urban-type settlement status since: 1978

Population (2010 Census)
  - Total: 4,163
  - Estimate (2023): 1,949 (−53.2%)

Administrative status
  - Capital of: Settlement of Serebryany Bor

Municipal status
  - Municipal district: Neryungrinsky Municipal District
  - Urban settlement: Serebryany Bor Urban Settlement
  - Capital of: Serebryany Bor Urban Settlement
- Time zone: UTC+
- Postal code: 678995
- OKTMO ID: 98660158051

Serebryany Bor population
- 2010 Census: 4,163
- 2002 Census: 4,447
- 1989 Census: 11,310
- 1979 Census: 4,038

Serebryany Bor (Russian: Сере́бряный Бор, lit. silver forest; Yakut: Серебряный Бор) is an urban locality (an urban-type settlement) in Neryungrinsky District of the Sakha Republic, Russia, located 6 kilometers (3.7 mi) from Neryungri, the administrative center of the district, on the Amur–Yakutsk Mainline, in the Aldan Highlands. As of the 2010 Census, its population was 4,163.

== History ==
The settlement was founded due to the construction of the Neryungrinsky GRES coal-fired power plant. Urban-type settlement status was granted in 1978.

== Administrative and municipal status ==
Within the framework of administrative divisions, the urban-type settlement of Serebryany Bor is incorporated within Neryungrinsky District as the Settlement of Serebryany Bor. As a municipal division, the Settlement of Serebryany Bor is incorporated within Neryungrinsky Municipal District as Serebryany Bor Urban Settlement.

== Economy ==
Immediately to the east of the settlement, the Olongoro River (a tributary of the Aldan) is dammed to create a reservoir, providing water for the local thermal power plant. The plant is the principal employer of the local population.

=== Transportation ===
A spur from the Amur–Yakutsk Mainline railway brings coal from the open-cut mine north-west of Neryungri. The Lena Highway to Yakutsk also runs by.
