= Bolshoye Tokko =

Lake in Russia

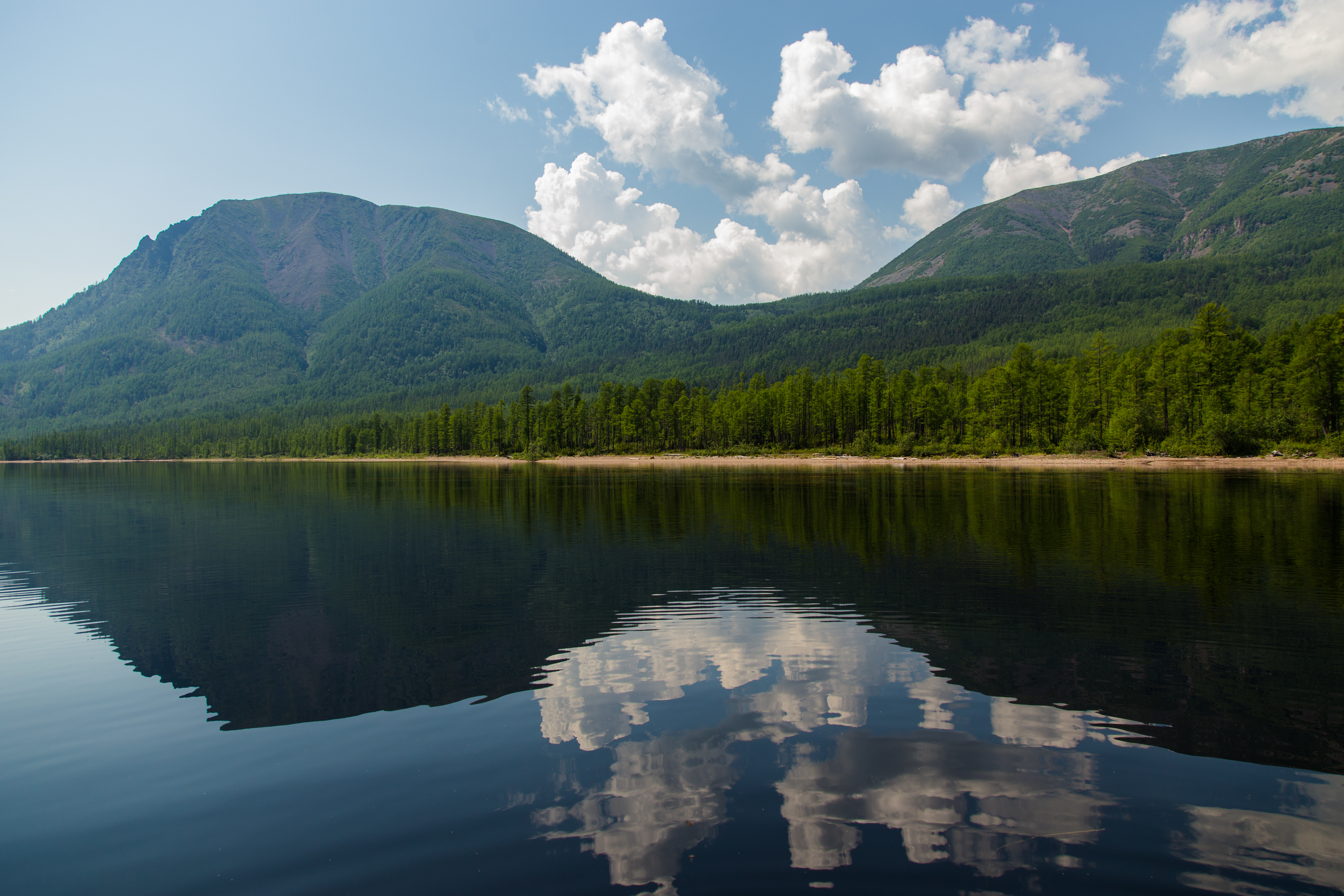

- Location within Russia Location within Sakha Republic
- Location: Sakha
- Coordinates: 56°16′N 130°32′E
- Primary inflows: Utuk
- Primary outflows: Mulam
- Basin countries: Russia
- Surface area: 82.6 km^{2} (31.9 sq mi)
- Average depth: 42 m (138 ft)
- Max. depth: 80 m (260 ft)
- Surface elevation: 903 m (2,963 ft)

The Bolshoye Tokko (Russian: Большое Токко) is a lake in Sakha, Russia. It has a surface of 82.6 square kilometres (31 7/8 square miles) and a catchment area of 919 square kilometres (355 square miles). Its outflow is the Mulam river, part the Uchur River basin. The lake is located in the Aldan Highlands, on the border of Sakha Republic and Khabarovsk Krai. River Utuk flows into the lake from the Toko-Stanovik subrange of the Stanovoy Highlands. It is the deepest lake in Yakutia.

== See also ==
- List of lakes of Russia
