= Khani, Sakha Republic =

Khani Хани
- Urban-type settlement

Other transcription(s)
  - Yakut: Хани
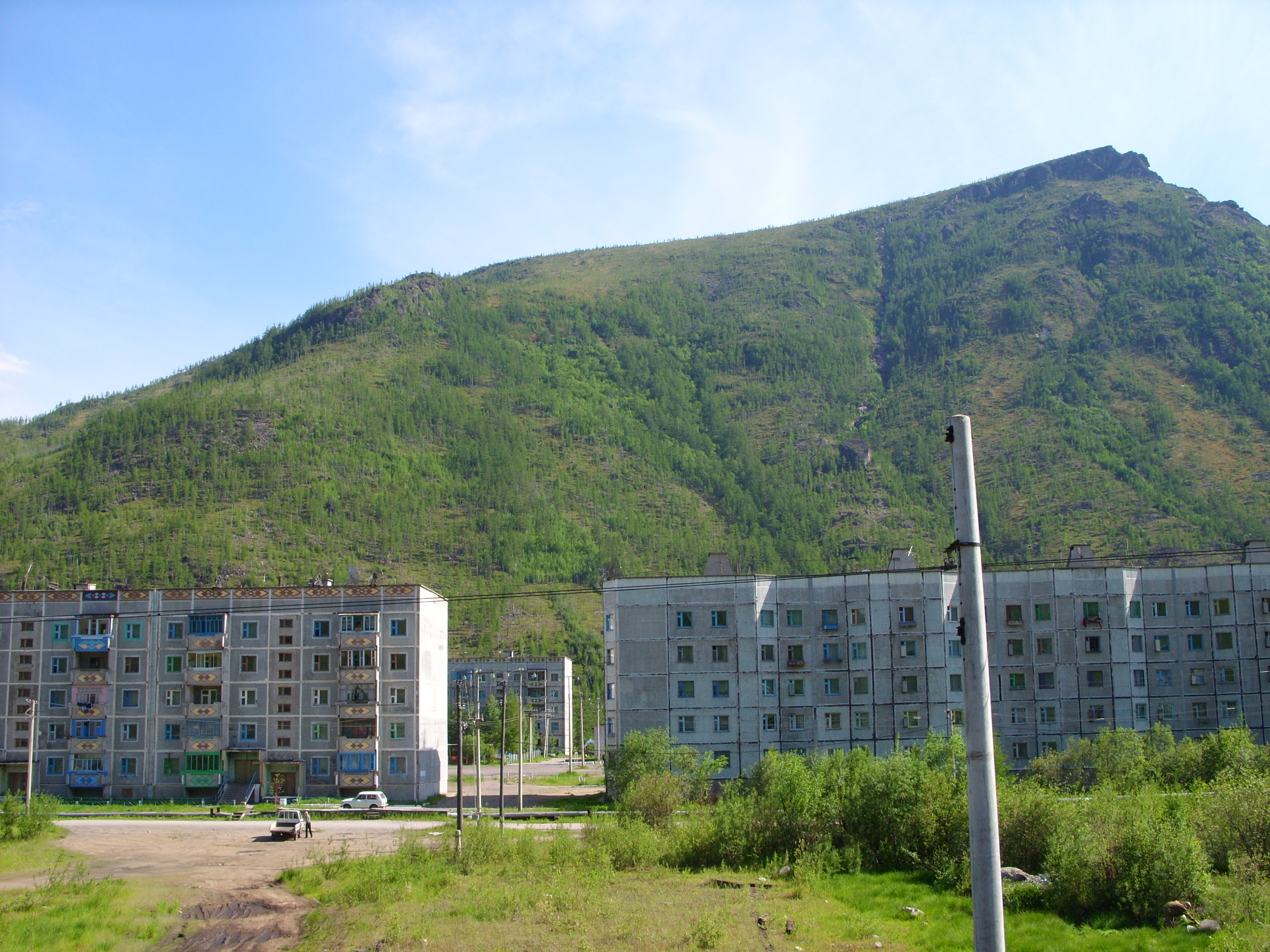
- In Khani
- Interactive map of Khani
- Location of Khani Khani (Sakha Republic)
- Coordinates: 56°56′N 119°59′E
- Country: Russia
- Federal subject: Sakha Republic
- Administrative district: Neryungrinsky District
- SettlementSelsoviet: Settlement of Khani
- late 1970s: 1980
- Urban-type settlement status since: 1981

Population (2010 Census)
  - Total: 764
  - Estimate (2023): 641 (−16.1%)

Administrative status
  - Capital of: Settlement of Khani

Municipal status
  - Municipal district: Neryungrinsky Municipal District
  - Urban settlement: Khani Urban Settlement
  - Capital of: Khani Urban Settlement
- Time zone: UTC+
- Postal code: 678976
- OKTMO ID: 98660164051

Khani population
- 2010 Census: 764
- 2002 Census: 933
- 1989 Census: 2,362

Khani (Russian: Хани; Yakut: Хани, Xani) is an urban locality (an urban-type settlement) in Neryungrinsky District of the Sakha Republic, Russia, located 405 kilometers (252 mi) from Neryungri, the administrative center of the district, near the borders with Amur Oblast and Zabaykalsky Krai. As of the 2010 Census, its population was 764.

== History ==
It was founded in the late 1970s, during the construction of the Baikal–Amur Mainline, and was granted urban-type settlement status in 1981. Around two thirds of the residents left after the completion of the railway in the late 1980s, with the population dropping drastically between 1989 and present.

== Administrative and municipal status ==
Within the framework of administrative divisions, the urban-type settlement of Khani is incorporated within Neryungrinsky District as the Settlement of Khani. As a municipal division, the Settlement of Khani is incorporated within Neryungrinsky Municipal District as Khani Urban Settlement.
