= Neryungrinsky District =

Neryungrinsky District Нерюнгринский улус (Russian)
- District

Other transcription(s)
  - Sakha: Нүөрүҥгүрү улууhа
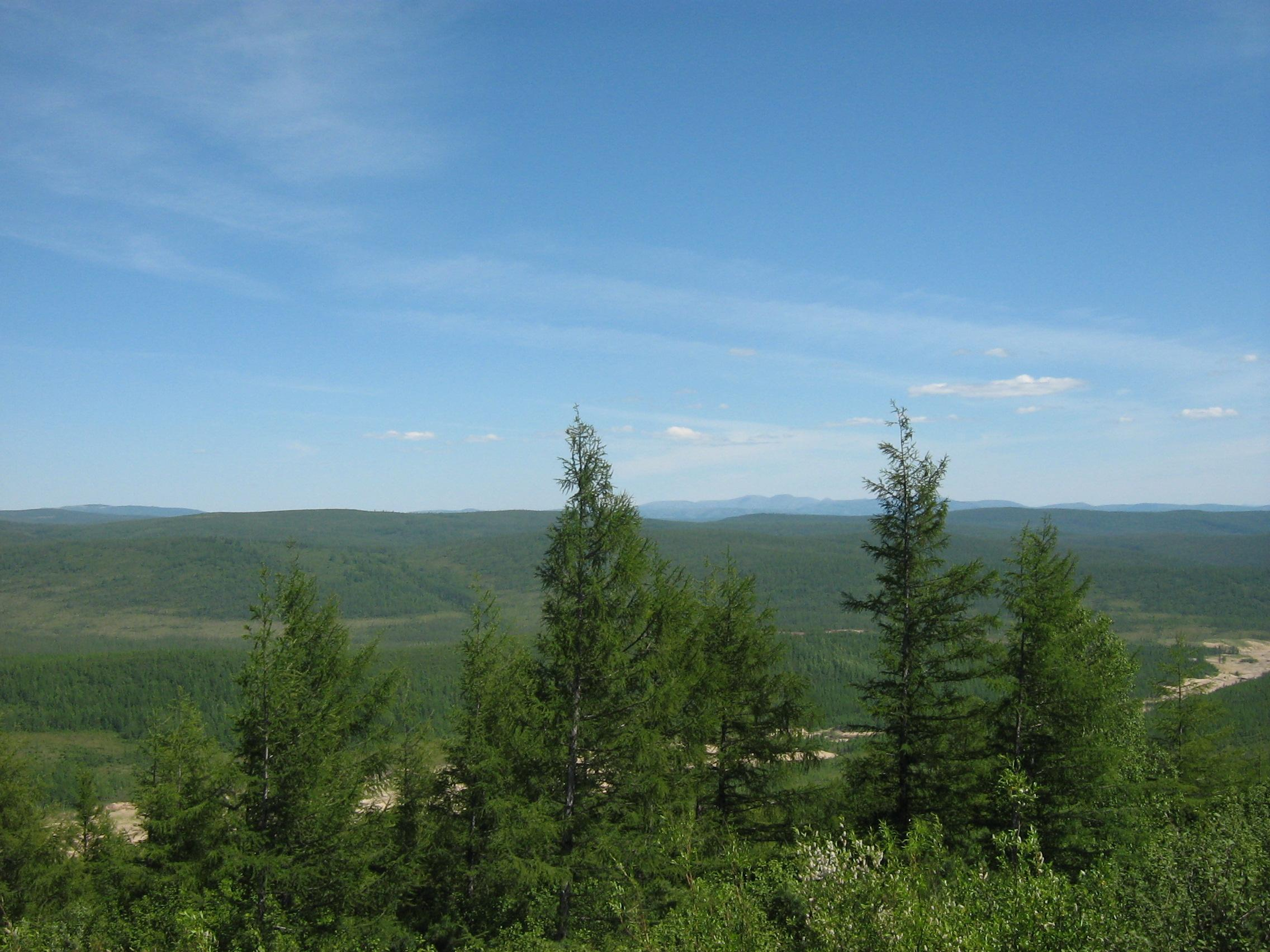
- Neryungrinskiy

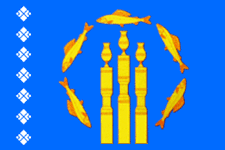
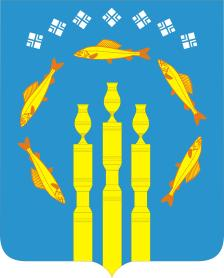
- Flag Coat of arms
- Location of Neryungrinsky District in the Sakha Republic
- Coordinates: 55.9°N 124.9°E
- Country: Russia
- Federal subject: Sakha Republic
- Established: November 6, 1975
- Administrative center: Neryungri

Area
  - Total: 98,900 km^{2} (38,200 sq mi)

Population (2010 Census)
  - Total: 21,019
  - Density: 0.213/km^{2} (0.550/sq mi)
  - Urban: 93.3%
  - Rural: 6.7%

Administrative structure
  - Administrative divisions: 6 Settlements, 1 Rural okrugs
  - Inhabited localities: 1 cities/towns, 6 urban-type settlements, 2 rural localities

Municipal structure
  - Municipally incorporated as: Neryungrinsky Municipal District
  - Municipal divisions: 6 urban settlements, 1 rural settlements
- Time zone: UTC+
- OKTMO ID: 98660000
- Website: http://www.neruadmin.ru/

Neryungrinsky District (Russian: Нерюнгри́нский улу́с; Yakut: Нүөрүҥгүрү улууһа, Nüörüŋgürü uluuha, Yakut pronunciation: [nyøɾyŋgyɾy uluːha]) is an administrative and municipal district (raion, or ulus), one of the thirty-four in the Sakha Republic, Russia. It is the southernmost district of Sakha and borders Aldansky District in the north, Olyokminsky District in the west and south, Amur Oblast and a small area of Zabaykalsky Krai in the west, and Khabarovsk Krai in the east. The area of the district is 98,900 square kilometers (38,200 sq mi). Its administrative center is the town of Neryungri. Population (excluding the administrative center): 21,019 (2010 census).

== Geography ==
The landscape of the district is mostly mountainous. The Toko-Stanovik range and lake Bolshoye Toko are located in the eastern part. The main river in the district is the Aldan with its tributaries the Timpton and the Chulman. Lake Bolshoye Toko is the deepest lake in Yakutia.

=== Climate ===
Average January temperature ranges from −30 °C (−22 °F) to −34 °C (−29 °F) and average July temperature ranges from +12 °C (54 °F) to +14 °C (57 °F). Annual precipitation is 400–500 millimeters (16–20 in).

== History ==
The district was established on November 6, 1975.

== Demographics ==
As of the 2021 Census, the ethnic composition was as follows:

- Russians: 82.4%
- Ukrainians: 3.5%
- Yakuts: 2.7%
- Buryats: 2.5%
- Evenks: 2.0%
- Tatars: 1.2%
- other ethnicities: 5.7%

== Economy ==
There are deposits of gold, coal, iron ore, molybdenum, and construction materials in the district.

== Administrative divisions ==
The district includes seven municipal divisions, covering a total of nine inhabited locations.

Municipal composition
Towns / Cities	Population	Male	Female	Inhabited localities in jurisdiction
Neryungri Urban Okrug (Нерюнгри)	61,747	29,674 (48.1%)	32,073 (51.9%)	**Town of Neryungri** (administrative centre of the district)
Urban settlements	Population	Male	Female	Inhabited localities in jurisdiction
Berkakit Urban Okrug (Беркакит)	4,291	2,036 (47.4%)	2.255 (52.6%)	**Urban-type settlement of Berkakit**
Zolotinka Urban Okrug (Золотинка)	620	304 (49.0%)	316 (51.0%)	**Urban-type settlement of Zolotinka**; Urban-type settlement of Nagorny
Serebryany Bor Urban Okrug (Серебряный Бор)	4,163	2,034 (48.9%)	2,129 (51.1%)	**Urban-type settlement of Serebryany Bor**
Khani Urban Okrug (Хани)	764	407 (53.3%)	357 (46.7%)	**Urban-type settlement of Khani**
Chulman Urban Okrug (Чульман)	10,077	4,722 (46.9%)	5,355 (53.2%)	**Urban-type settlement of Chulman**; selo of Bolshoy Khatymi
Rural settlements	Population	Male	Female	Rural localities in jurisdiction*
Iyengirinsky Nasleg (Иенгринский)	1,104	516 (46.7%)	588 (53.3%)	**selo of Iyengra**

Divisional source:
Population source:
*Administrative centers are shown in bold
