= Berkakit =

Berkakit Беркакит
- Urban-type settlement

Other transcription(s)
  - Yakut: Беркакит
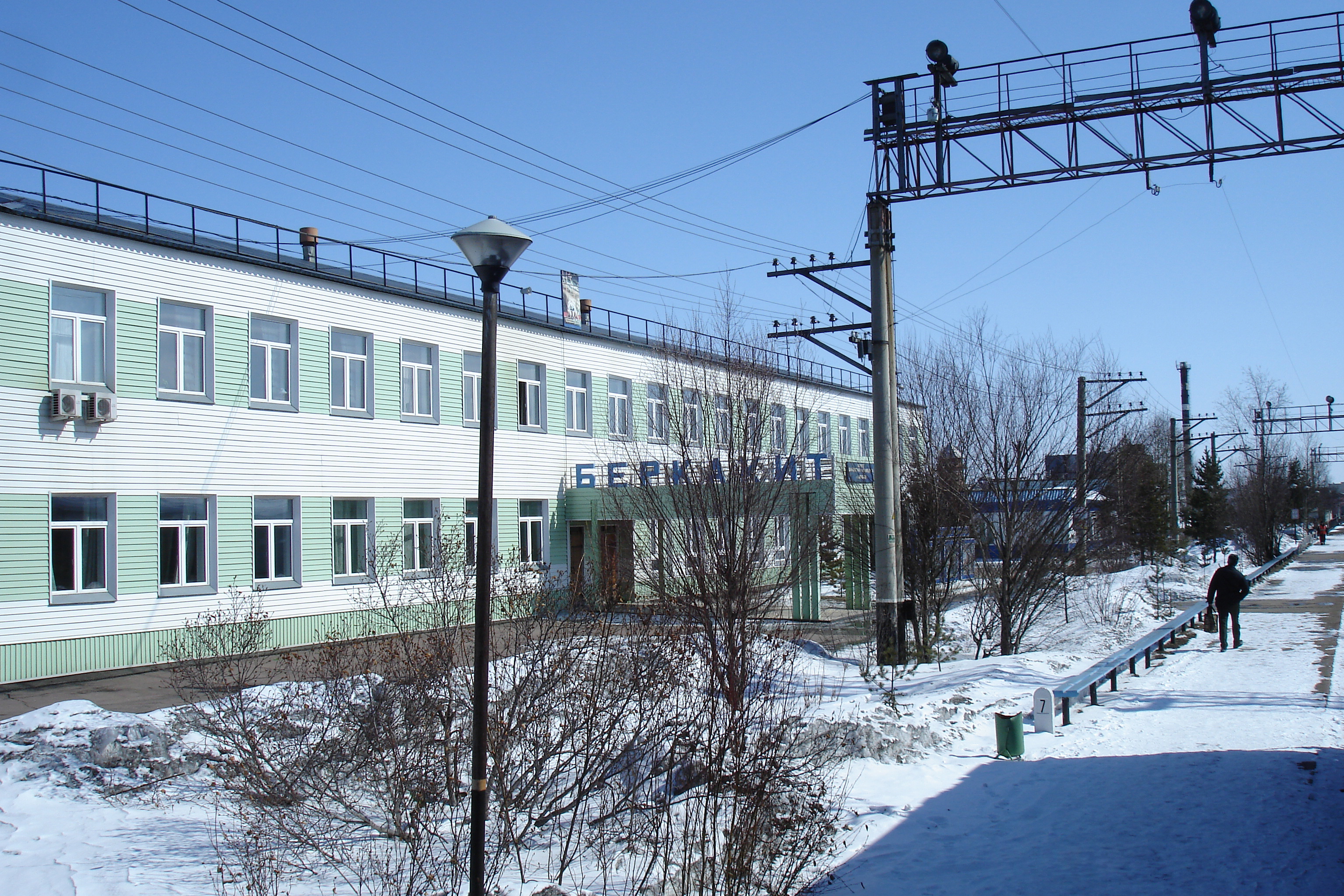
- Berkakit railway station

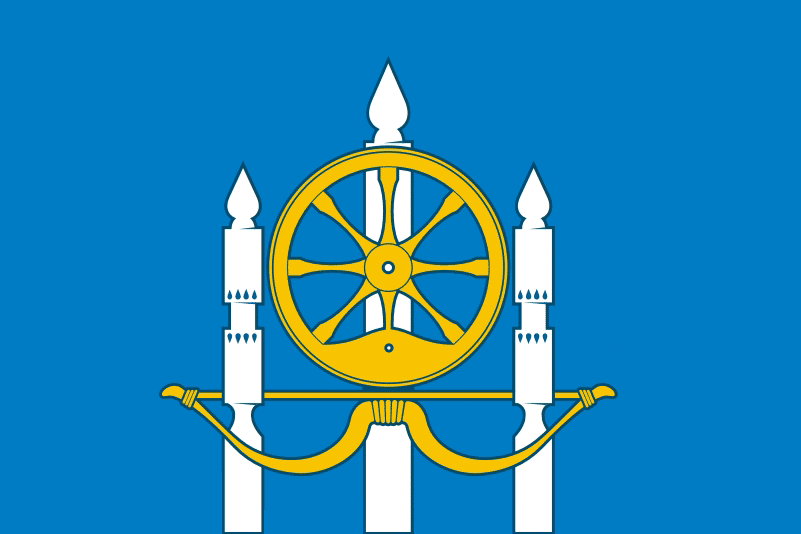
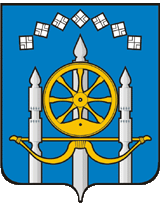
- Flag Coat of arms
- Interactive map of Berkakit
- Location of Berkakit Berkakit (Sakha Republic)
- Coordinates: 56°35′N 124°46′E
- Country: Russia
- Federal subject: Sakha Republic
- Administrative district: Neryungrinsky District
- SettlementSelsoviet: Settlement of Berkakit
- Founded: 1975
- Urban-type settlement status since: 1977
- Elevation: 812 m (2,664 ft)

Population (2010 Census)
  - Total: 4,291
  - Estimate (2023): 3,641 (−15.1%)

Administrative status
  - Capital of: Settlement of Berkakit

Municipal status
  - Municipal district: Neryungrinsky Municipal District
  - Urban settlement: Berkakit Urban Settlement
  - Capital of: Berkakit Urban Settlement
- Time zone: UTC+
- Postal code: 678990
- Dialing code: +7 41147
- OKTMO ID: 98660152051

Berkakit population
- 2010 Census: 4,291
- 2002 Census: 4,925
- 1989 Census: 9,031
- 1979 Census: 4,599

Berkakit (Russian: Беркаки́т; Yakut: Беркакит) is an urban locality (an urban-type settlement) in Neryungrinsky District of the Sakha Republic, Russia, located 7 kilometers (4.3 mi) from Neryungri, the administrative center of the district. As of the 2010 Census, its population was 4,291.

== History ==
Urban-type settlement status was granted to it in 1977.

== Administrative and municipal status ==
Within the framework of administrative divisions, the urban-type settlement of Berkakit is incorporated within Neryungrinsky District as the Settlement of Berkakit. As a municipal division, the Settlement of Berkakit is incorporated within Neryungrinsky Municipal District as Berkakit Urban Settlement.

== Transportation ==
Berkakit sits on both the Amur–Yakutsk Mainline and Amur–Yakutsk Highway.
