= Chulman Neryungri Airport =

Airport in Yakutia, Russia

Chulman Neryungri Airport Yakut: Нүрүңгири Аэропорт — Чульман Nüörüŋgürü Aeroporta — Chulman Russian: Аэропорт Нерюнгри — Чульман
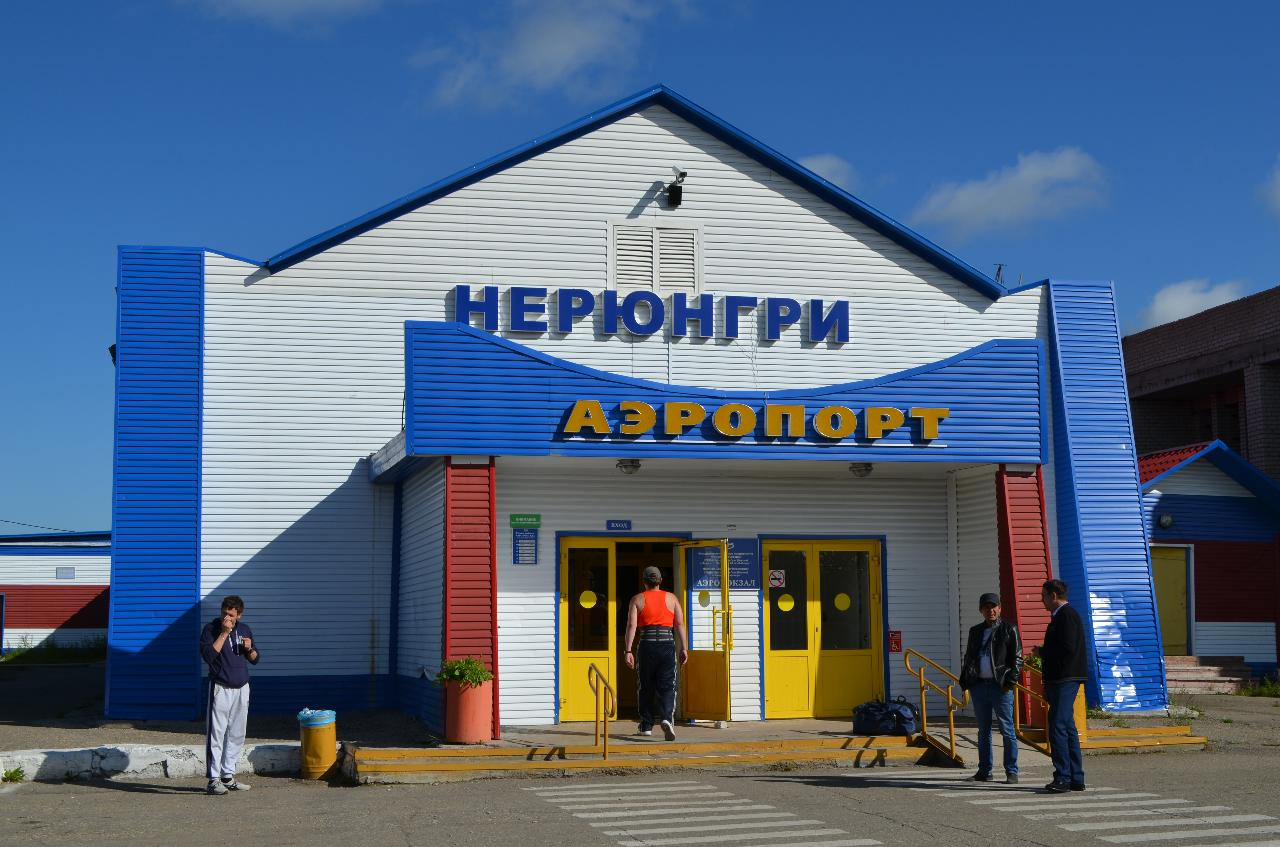
- IATA: NER; ICAO: UELL; LID: НРГ

Summary
- Airport type: Public
- Operator: Airports of the North
- Serves: Chulman and Neryungri
- Location: Chulman, Russia
- Elevation AMSL: 2,812 ft (857 m)
- Coordinates: 56°54′48″N 124°54′42″E
- Website: sever.aero/neryungri

Map
- Location of airport in Sakha Republic

Runways
Direction	Length		Surface
Direction	ft	m	Surface
08/26	11,811	3,600	Concrete

Chulman Neryungri Airport (IATA: NER, ICAO: UELL) (Yakut: Нүрүңгири Аэропорт — Чульман, Nüörüŋgürü Aeroporta — Chulman, Russian: Аэропорт Нерюнгри — Чульман) is a civilian airport in Yakutia, Russia located 8 km north of Chulman and 40 km north of Neryungri. The IATA code NER and the Russian internal code НРГ also refer to the city of Neryungri.

The airport services up to medium-sized airliners. Chulman is designated as one of several emergency airfields for commercial airline cross-polar routes or ETOPS 180/207 diversion airport.

== Airlines and destinations ==
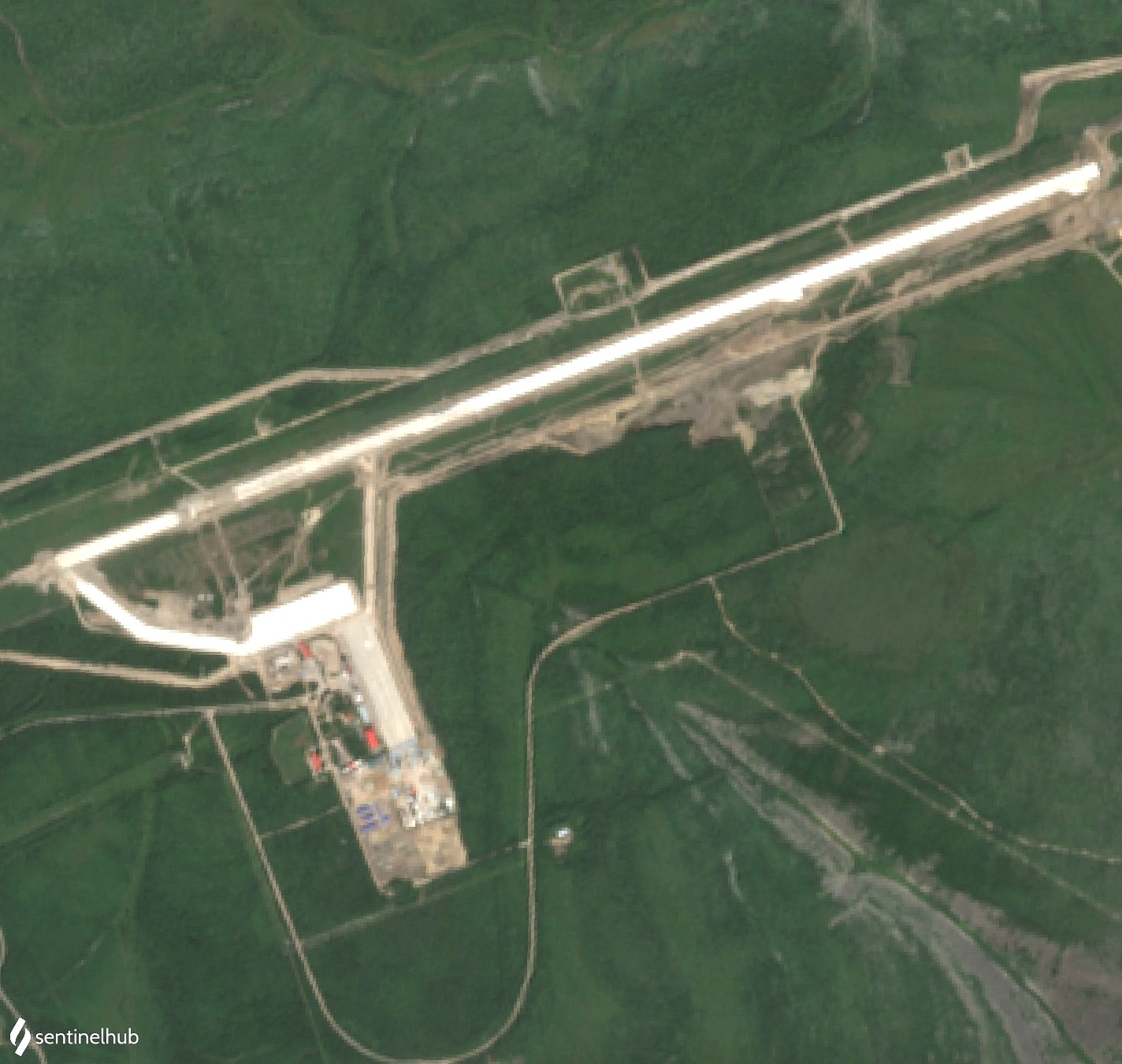
Chulman Airport

Airlines	Destinations
Aurora	Khabarovsk
Iraero	Blagoveshchensk, Vladivostok
S7 Airlines	Irkutsk, Moscow-Domodedovo, Novosibirsk
Yakutia Airlines	Irkutsk, Khabarovsk, Moscow–Vnukovo, Novosibirsk, Yakutsk

== See also ==
- List of airports in Russia
