= Timpton =

Timpton Yakut: Төмтөөн
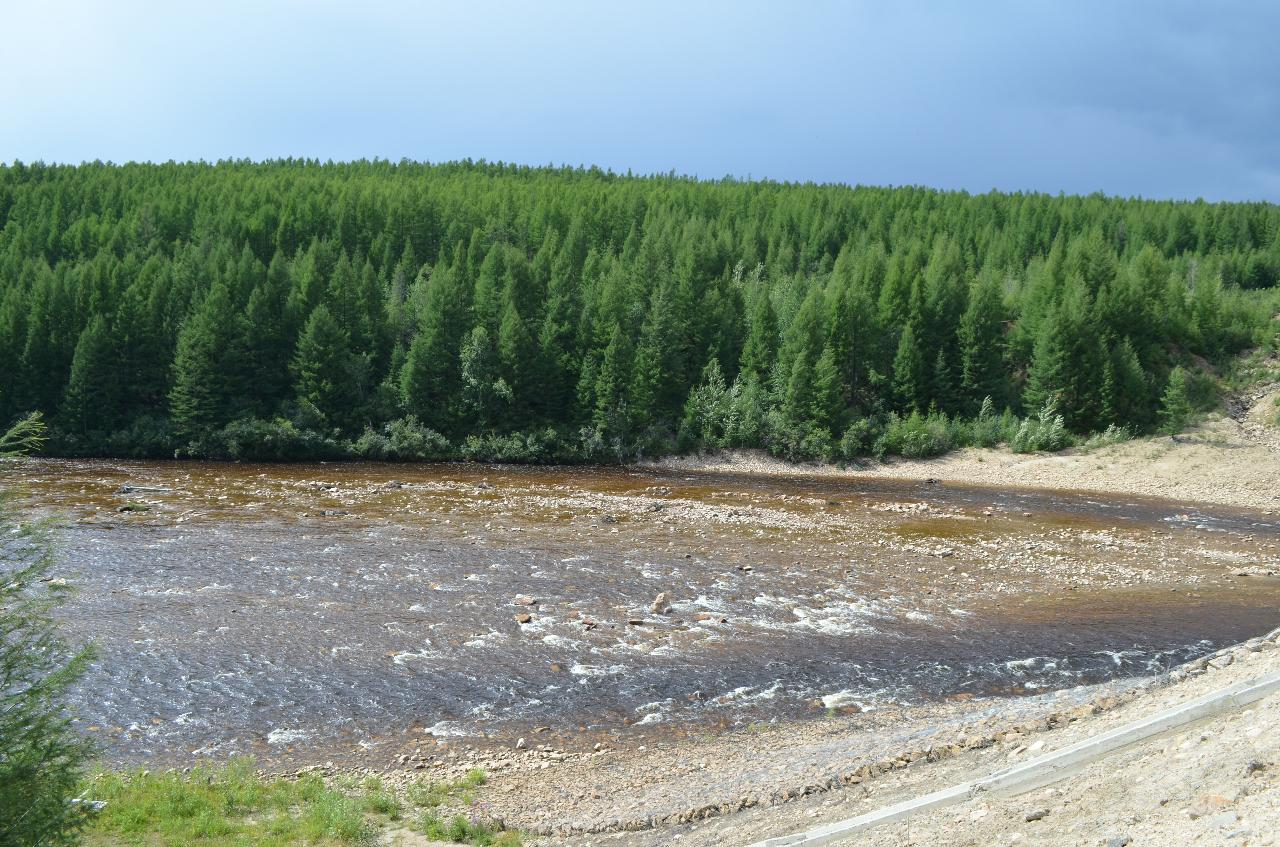
- View of a bend in the river

- Mouth location in Yakutia, Russia

Location
- Country: Russia

Physical characteristics
- Source
  - location: Stanovoy Range
  - coordinates: 56°00′45″N 124°23′50″E
  - elevation: 1,060 m (3,480 ft)
- Mouth: Aldan
  - coordinates: 58°44′01″N 127°10′40″E
  - elevation: 255 m (837 ft)
- Length: 644 km (400 mi)
- Basin size: 44,400 km^{2} (17,100 sq mi)
- Discharge
  - average: 94 m^{3}/s (3,300 cu ft/s)

Basin features
- Progression: Aldan→ Lena→ Laptev Sea

The Timpton (Russian: Тимптон; Yakut: Төмтөөн) is a river in Sakha Republic (Yakutia), Russia. It is a right tributary of the Aldan River of the Lena basin. It has a length of 644 kilometres (400 mi) and a drainage basin area of 44,400 square kilometres (17,100 mi^{2}). There are no settlements near its banks except for Nagorny village.

The Timpton is crossed by the A360 Lena Highway and coal is mined in the river basin. Up to the present the Timpton is in a relative pristine condition, being a favorite destination for rafting and kayaking, but construction of the Nizhne-Timpton hydroelectric power station, approved in 2009, is planned on the river course in the future.

Grayling, whitefish, taimen, rudd, perch and lenok are found in the waters of the river.

== Course ==
The Timpton is the fourth tributary of the Aldan regarding length and basin area. Its source is located on the northern slopes of the Stanovoy Range, at the southern limit of Yakutia, near the Amur Oblast border. First it flows in an eastward direction and then it turns and flows in a roughly northward direction along its course. It crosses the foothills of the Aldan Highlands and its valley marks the western limit of the Sunnagyn Range. Its upper course is tortuous, with frequent rapids. There is no floodplain, but the last stretch is navigable. Finally the Timpton joins the right bank of the Aldan 1,538 km (956 mi) from its mouth.

Its tributaries include the Big Yllymakh, Chulmakan, Chulman and Iyengra. The river is frozen between October and May.

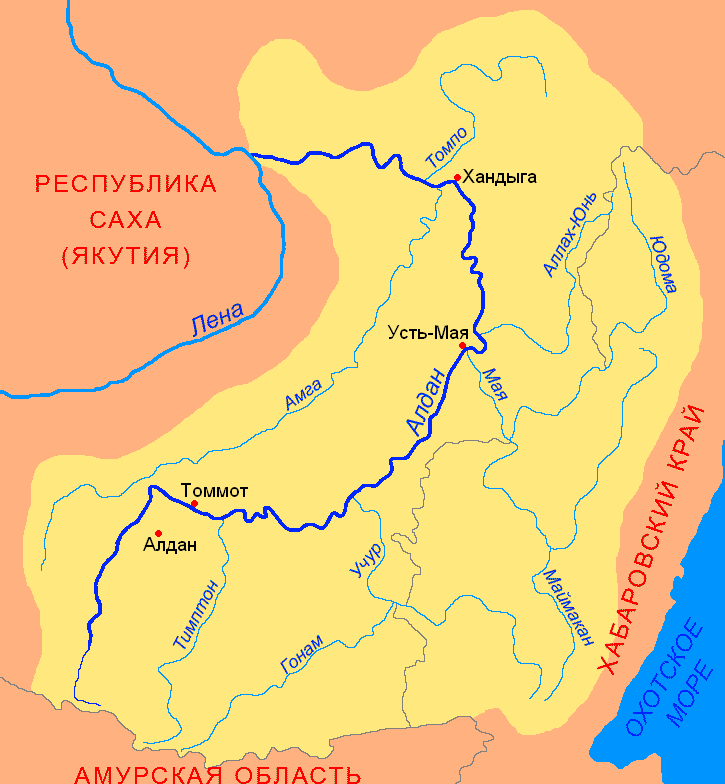
Basin of the Aldan

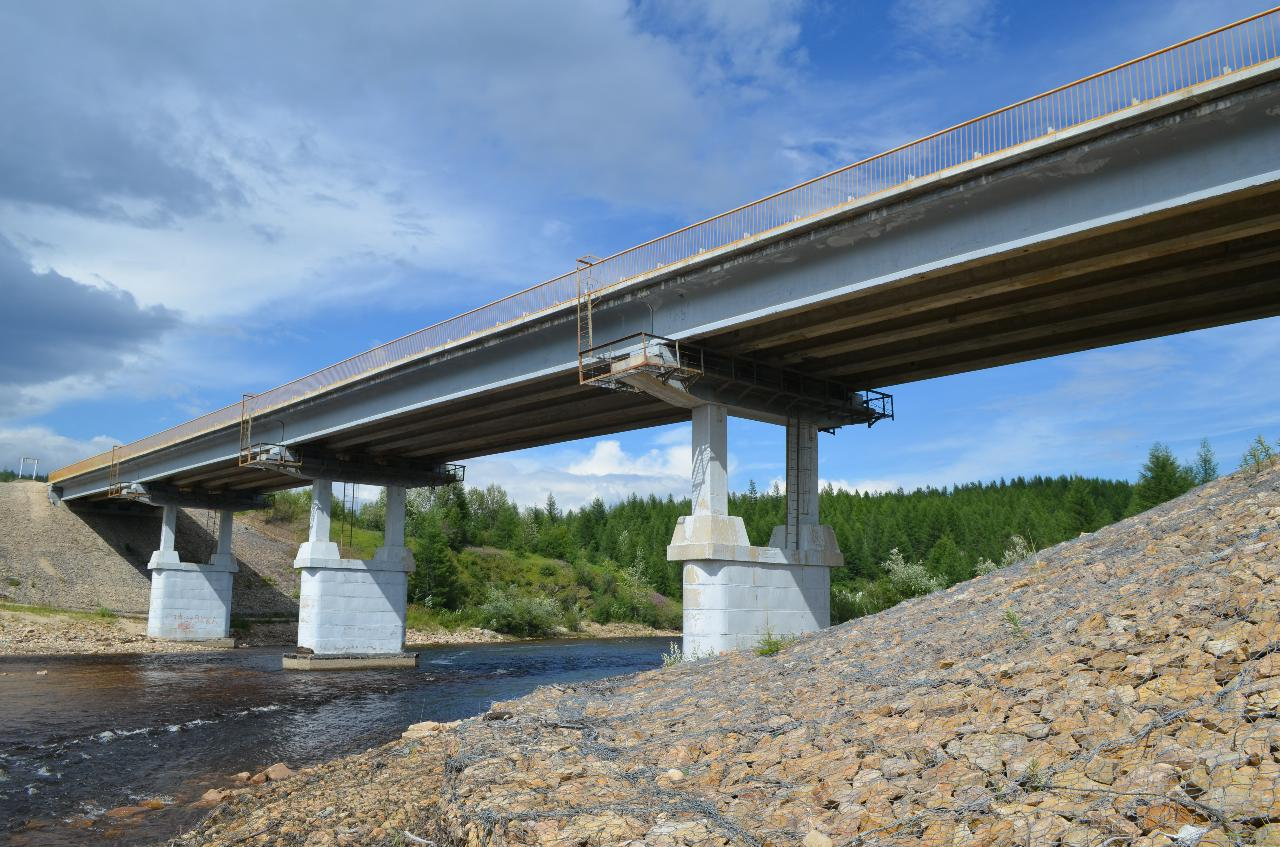
A360 Lena Highway bridge over the Timpton

== See also ==
- List of rivers of Russia
- South Yakutia HPP
