= Chulman =

Chulman Чульман
- Urban-type settlement

Other transcription(s)
  - Yakut: Чульман
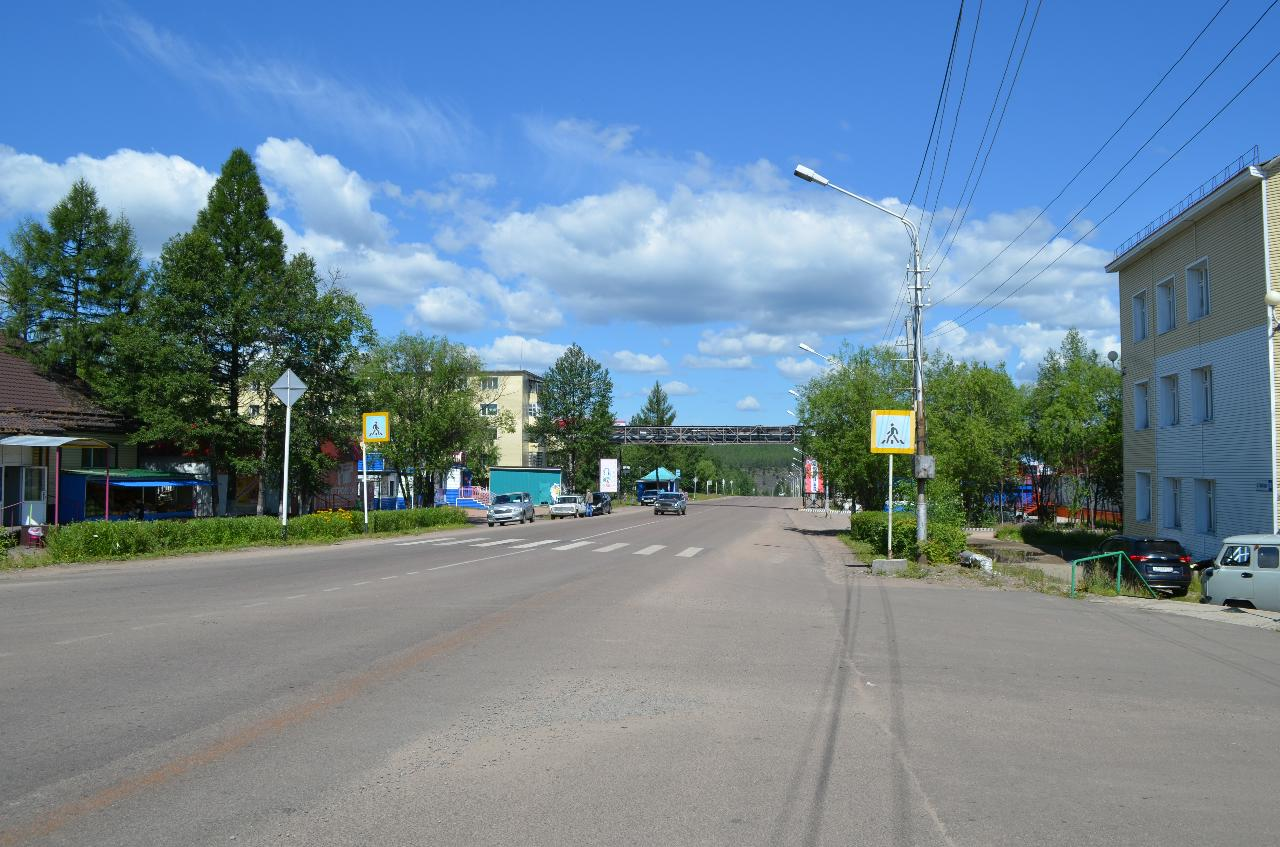
- View of the street in Chulman

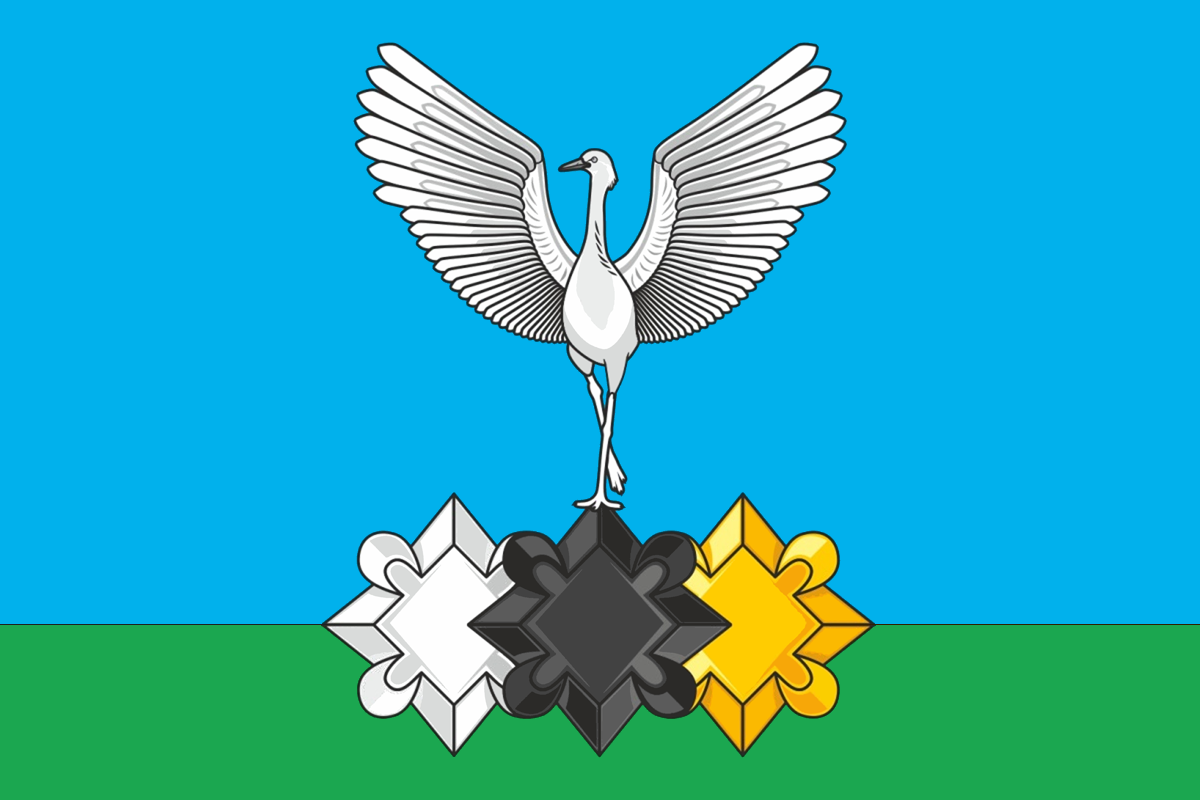
- Flag
- Interactive map of Chulman
- Location of Chulman Chulman (Sakha Republic)
- Coordinates: 56°51′N 124°52′E
- Country: Russia
- Federal subject: Sakha Republic
- Administrative district: Neryungrinsky District
- SettlementSelsoviet: Settlement of Chulman
- Founded: 1926
- Urban-type settlement status since: 1941

Population (2010 Census)
  - Total: 9,766
  - Estimate (2023): 7,428 (−23.9%)

Administrative status
  - Capital of: Settlement of Chulman

Municipal status
  - Municipal district: Neryungrinsky Municipal District
  - Urban settlement: Chulman Urban Settlement
  - Capital of: Chulman Urban Settlement
- Time zone: UTC+
- Postal codes: 678980, 678981
- OKTMO ID: 98660165051

Chulman population
- 2010 Census: 9,766
- 2002 Census: 10,782
- 1989 Census: 17,354
- 1979 Census: 12,875

Chulman (Russian: Чульман) is an urban locality (an urban-type settlement) in Neryungrinsky District of the Sakha Republic, Russia, located 41 kilometers (25 mi) from Neryungri, the administrative center of the district, on the Chulman River. As of the 2010 Census, its population was 9,766.

== Geography ==
The town is located in the Aldan Highlands, there is a deep gorge to the east with white cliffs.

== History ==
It was founded with nineteen inhabitants in 1926. Urban-type settlement status was granted to it in 1941. During the late 1940s and early 1950s, it was the location of a gulag work camp.

== Administrative and municipal status ==
Within the framework of administrative divisions, the urban-type settlement of Chulman is incorporated within Neryungrinsky District as the Settlement of Chulman. As a municipal division, the Settlement of Chulman, together with one rural locality (the selo of Bolshoy Khatymi) under direct jurisdiction of Neryungrinsky District, is incorporated within Neryungrinsky Municipal District as Chulman Urban Settlement.

== Economy ==
Employment in Chulman is mainly in the mining of coal, granite, and gemstones industries, as well as at the power station.

== Transportation ==
Chulman is served by the Chulman Airport and is a station on the Amur–Yakutsk Mainline.

== Climate ==
Chulman has a subarctic climate (Köppen climate classification Dfc/Dwc). Winters are bitterly cold with average temperatures from −33.9 to −26.7 °C (−29.0 to −16.1 °F) in January, while summers are mild with average temperatures from +10.9 to +21.8 °C (51.6 to 71.2 °F) in July. Precipitation is moderate and is much higher in summer than at other times of the year.

Climate data for Chulman
Month	Jan	Feb	Mar	Apr	May	Jun	Jul	Aug	Sep	Oct	Nov	Dec	Year
Record high °C (°F)	−5.6 (21.9)	−1.2 (29.8)	7.4 (45.3)	17.6 (63.7)	28.1 (82.6)	34.6 (94.3)	34.8 (94.6)	32.5 (90.5)	26.3 (79.3)	17.7 (63.9)	4.6 (40.3)	−1.8 (28.8)	34.8 (94.6)
Mean daily maximum °C (°F)	−26.7 (−16.1)	−20.6 (−5.1)	−10.6 (12.9)	−0.1 (31.8)	9.8 (49.6)	19.5 (67.1)	21.8 (71.2)	18.8 (65.8)	9.3 (48.7)	−3.0 (26.6)	−17.5 (0.5)	−26.3 (−15.3)	−2.1 (28.1)
Daily mean °C (°F)	−30.4 (−22.7)	−25.0 (−13.0)	−15.8 (3.6)	−4.8 (23.4)	4.6 (40.3)	13.4 (56.1)	16.1 (61.0)	13.0 (55.4)	4.5 (40.1)	−7.1 (19.2)	−21.2 (−6.2)	−29.8 (−21.6)	−6.9 (19.6)
Mean daily minimum °C (°F)	−33.9 (−29.0)	−29.2 (−20.6)	−21.2 (−6.2)	−9.8 (14.4)	−0.4 (31.3)	7.6 (45.7)	10.9 (51.6)	7.9 (46.2)	0.2 (32.4)	−10.9 (12.4)	−24.8 (−12.6)	−33.1 (−27.6)	−11.4 (11.5)
Record low °C (°F)	−61.0 (−77.8)	−56.9 (−70.4)	−49.8 (−57.6)	−37.0 (−34.6)	−21.6 (−6.9)	−6.4 (20.5)	−3.7 (25.3)	−8.0 (17.6)	−19.2 (−2.6)	−38.7 (−37.7)	−50.8 (−59.4)	−57.9 (−72.2)	−61.0 (−77.8)
Average precipitation mm (inches)	15 (0.6)	12 (0.5)	14 (0.6)	28 (1.1)	52 (2.0)	91 (3.6)	108 (4.3)	91 (3.6)	79 (3.1)	51 (2.0)	27 (1.1)	16 (0.6)	584 (23.1)
Average rainy days	0	0	0.1	4	16	19	19	19	18	4	0	0	99.1
Average snowy days	26	22	19	14	4	0	0	0.1	3	21	26	27	162.1
Average relative humidity (%)	82	79	70	63	61	65	71	74	75	77	83	82	74
Average dew point °C (°F)	−33 (−27)	−27 (−17)	−20 (−4)	−11 (12)	−3 (27)	6 (43)	10 (50)	8 (46)	0 (32)	−10 (14)	−24 (−11)	−32 (−26)	−11 (12)
Source 1: pogoda.ru.net
Source 2: Time and Date (dewpoints, between 1985-2015)
