= Amur–Yakutsk Mainline =

Partially complete Russian railway

Coordinates: 62.045°N 129.730°E

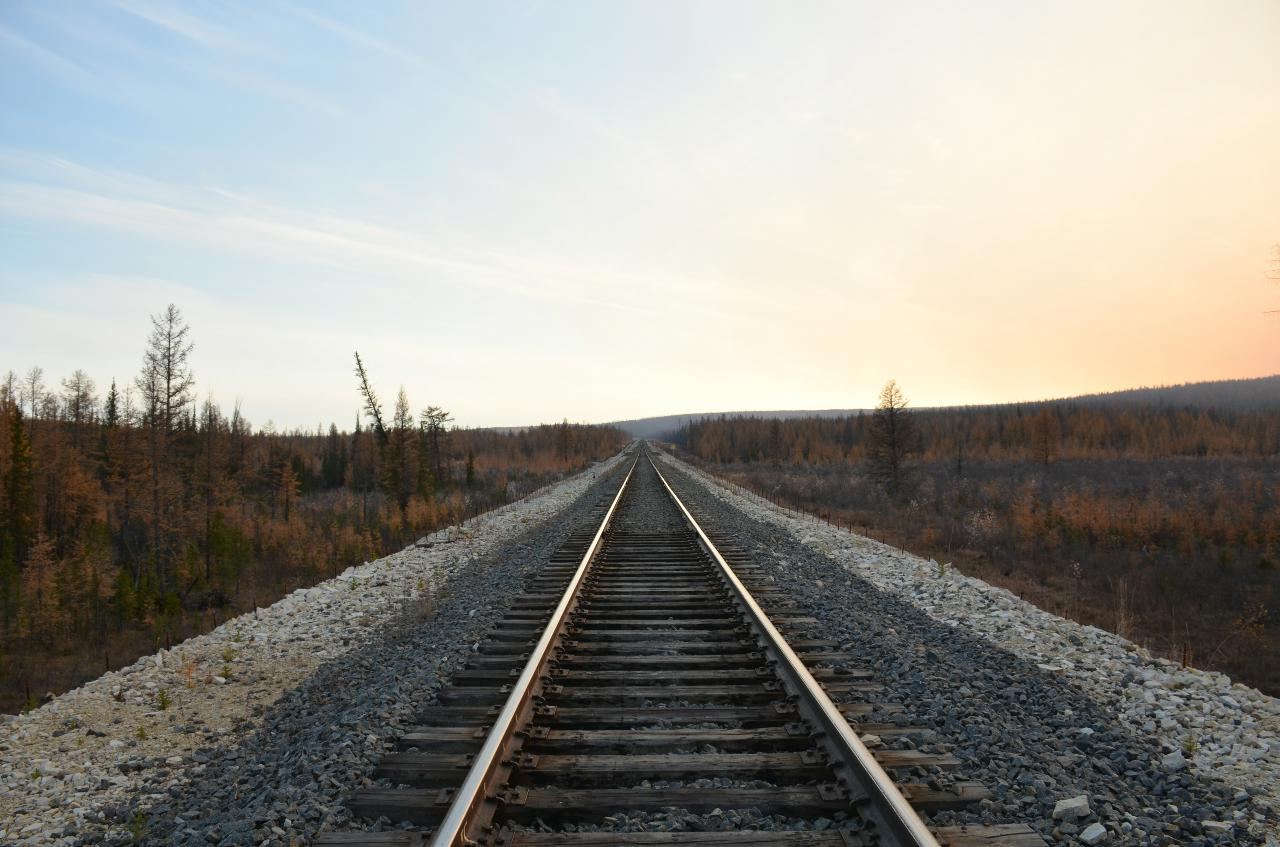

Overview
- Other name: Yakutian Railway
- Native name: Амуро-Якутская магистраль
- Status: Operational
- Locale: Russian Far East
- Termini: Tynda; Nizhny Bestyakh
- Continues from: Trans–Siberian Railway
- Stations: 50

Service
- Type: Regional rail; Freight rail
- System: Far Eastern Railway (Skovorodino–Neryungri); Yakutian Railway (Neryungri–Nizhny Bestyakh)
- Operator(s): Russian Railways; Yakutian Railway

History
- Commenced: 5 April 1972
- Opened: 2 November 1976
- Completed: 15 November 2011

Technical
- Line length: 767 km (477 mi)
- Number of tracks: 1
- Track gauge: 1,520 mm (4 ft 11 27/32 in) Russian gauge

The Amur–Yakutsk Mainline (Russian: Амуро-Якутская магистраль, Amuro-Yakutskaya Magistral), abbreviated to AYaM (Russian АЯM), is a partially complete railway in eastern Russia, linking the Trans–Siberian Railway and Baikal–Amur Mainline with the Sakha Republic.

Passenger services on the line go from Tynda to the town of Nizhny Bestyakh, opposite the river from Yakutsk. In November 2011, construction of the railway reached Nizhny Bestyakh. The railway via Nizhny Bestyakh is planned in the long term to form the start of a railway towards Magadan and possibly even across the Bering Strait.

== Route ==
Map of major railways in Russia, with Trans–Siberian Railway shown in red, BAM in green and Amur Yakutsk Mainline (including "Little BAM") shown in orange

The line is single-track, excepting the double-track section from Tynda to Bestuzhevo, which is shared with the Baikal–Amur Mainline (BAM). The full length of the line is not electrified.

As in most of Siberia, the construction and operation of the railway are complicated by the large temperature variations, ranging from under −50 °C (−58 °F) in winter to over 30 °C (86 °F) in summer, as well as the challenges of building on permafrost in difficult terrain.

The line currently has an official length of 1,213 kilometres (754 miles), branching from the Trans–Siberian railway at Bamovskaya station, near Skovorodino in Amur Oblast. The line continues north, joining the Baikal–Amur Mainline near Tynda and continuing along the BAM for 27 kilometres (17 miles) before branching northwards at Bestuzhevo. The line in this section crosses the Gilyuy River twice. Shortly after entering the Sakha Republic, the line passes through the 1,300-metre-long (4,300-foot) Nagorny tunnel under the Stanovoy Range.

In the highlands of southern Sakha Republic, the line crosses numerous further rivers, including the Iyengra and Chulman, before reaching the coal-mining area around Neryungri at around 400 kilometres (250 miles). The settlement of Berkakit, situated 9 kilometres (5.6 miles) south of Neryungri, was founded in 1977 as the base for the railway's operations in the south of the Sakha Republic. Berkakit is the official starting point for the current project to construct the railway to Yakutsk (officially referred to as the Berkakit–Tommot–Yakutsk Line), and the majority of the town's workforce is employed either in management or maintenance of the railway.

To the north of Neryungri, the railway crosses the Aldan Highlands, before reaching Aldan at kilometre 686, where the main offices of the Yakutia Railways are located. The current terminus of the operating section of the line is Tommot, on the right bank of the Aldan River at kilometer 767.

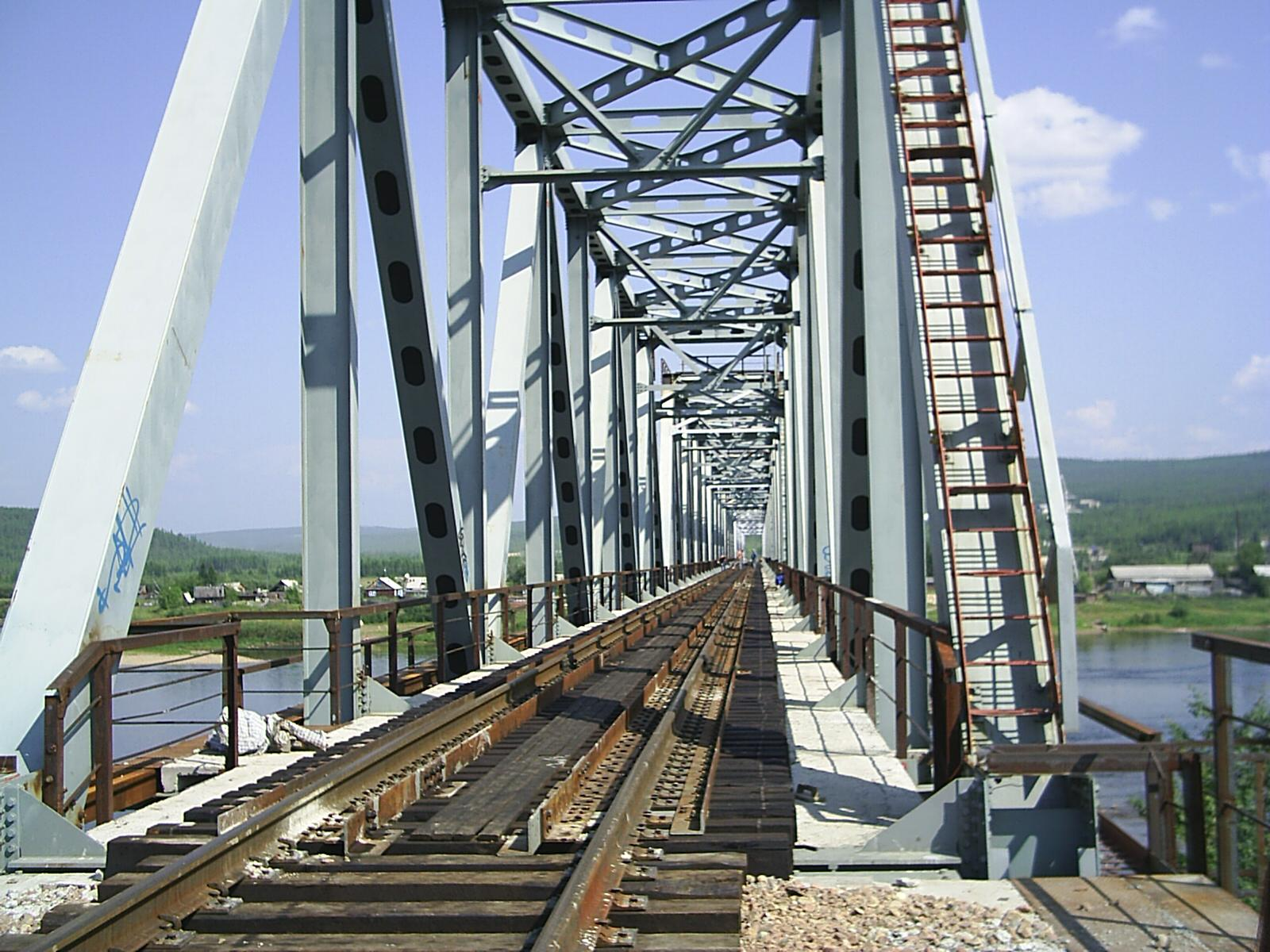
Bridge over the Aldan River at Tommot

Beyond Tommot station, the railway crosses the Aldan on a 350-metre-long (1,150-foot) bridge, the longest on the line. From here, the line continues to the settlement of Verkhnyaya Amga (station simply named Amga), where it crosses the Amga River. Provisional goods services began to Amga in 2006, with construction trains travelling as far as Kharbykan.

Construction reached the settlement of Kerdyom, by the mouth of the Lyutenge on the Lena River, opposite the town of Pokrovsk, by 2008. From here, it was planned to start construction of a 3-kilometre-long (1.9-mile) combined road and rail bridge across the Lena in 2009, in the area of the settlement Tabaga. The line was to continue to the city of Yakutsk, with a passenger terminal to be built, and an extension to the river port.

With the expected difficulties in building a bridge across the more than 2 km-wide Lena, prone to massive flooding in spring and with moving ice during autumn, there has been much discussion of the rail head remaining on the east bank of the river, terminating in Nizhny Bestyakh, across the river from Yakutsk. This section has been built, the connection over the river to Yakutsk city being postponed. The route via Nizhny Bestyakh will now form the beginning of any further extensions towards Magadan. A bridge across the Lena began construction in 2024, but it will be solely a road bridge.

As of early 2014, there were twice weekly trains from Moscow and from Khabarovsk, ending at Neryungri. The travel time from Shturm (1st station of AYaM) to Neryungri (390 km) was 11 hours.

From 2019, there are passenger trains to Nizhny Bestyakh.

== History ==
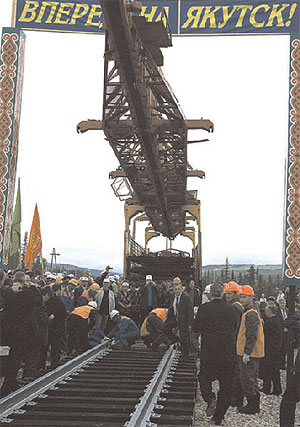
Ceremony at Neryungri in 1985, marking the beginning of construction towards Yakutsk

Construction of the AYaM began in the 1930s, with the construction of the spur line from Bamovskaya to Tynda (then known as Tyndinsky) as part of the planned construction of the Baikal–Amur Mainline. This section began operation in 1935, but was then dismantled in 1940-41 as the Second World War saw the BAM project cancelled and the rails were reused for other projects closer to the front.

Reconstruction of the Bamovskaya-Tynda section (known as the "Little BAM") began on 5 April 1972, almost two years before the government of the Soviet Union announced the revival of the BAM project in 1974. The start of provisional services on the Little BAM began in November 1976, with full services in October 1977. At the same time, the line was extended northwards, the section Tynda–Berkakit opened in October 1979, extending as far as Neryungri.

From 1989, construction recommenced from Neryungri towards Chulman. This extension branches a few kilometers before the previous terminus of Neryungri-Gruzovaya (cargo terminal). Traffic was gradually extended to Chulman, Aldan and finally to Tommot, firstly construction and cargo traffic, followed by passenger services. The complete section to Tommot was declared open on 24 August 2004. Since this date a daily passenger service has run between Neryungri and Tommot, covering the 368 Kilometer section in around 8 hours.

The bridge crossing the Aldan River in Tommot, at 400 metres (1,300 ft) wide at this point the largest river on the planned route besides the Lena, was completed in the 1990s, although not initially used. A further section of around 60 km was under construction when financial problems halted the project.

Construction resumed in 2005, with construction traffic able to operate through to Kharbykan by the start of 2007. Cargo traffic currently operates as far as Amga. In early 2009 the construction reached the dual settlements of Pokrovsk/Kyordyom, on the left and right banks of Lena respectively, some 78 km south of Yakutsk.

The first train was welcomed into Kyordyom on September 25, 2010. The line to Nizhny Bestyakh was officially completed on November 15, 2011, with officials stating that a bridge across the river to Yakutsk would be constructed in the near future.

On July 27, 2019, passenger trains started to go to Nizhny Bestyakh.

== Future planning ==
=== Lena crossing ===
Planning for the line almost as far as Yakutsk is complete, although there has been debate as to whether the line should end at the settlement of Nizhny Bestyakh, on the opposite bank of the Lena River from Yakutsk, or whether a bridge (or possibly tunnel) should be built. The decision for or against a river crossing depends on a number of questions regarding both costs and engineering challenges. The Lena is at this point more than 2 km wide, has a number of side streams, and can flood the valley to a width of up to 10 km during the snowmelt in spring.

There is currently no bridge of any kind across the Lena in the Sakha Republic. Air travel is currently the only mode of transport to Yakutsk available year-round; land transport to the outside world is possible via ferry in summer, or by driving across the frozen river in winter. During spring and autumn, the moving ice on the river makes crossings impossible. The dual road-rail bridge would allow year-round land access to the city for the first time.

The site being considered is across a narrow section of the river near Tabaga, 40 km upstream from Yakutsk.

On July 14, 2010, in Moscow, a meeting was held to discuss the construction of a tunnel under the Lena river, instead of a bridge. Construction of a tunnel would be quicker and cost less than that of a bridge, as it would not be dependent on seasonal construction hampered by the river freezing over in autumn and breaking up in spring. The flooding situation of the river also makes the tunnel more attractive. However, the annual maintenance costs for a tunnel were estimated to be more than twice that of a bridge. Construction of a tunnel in permafrost also posed engineering challenges.

In July 2013, the federal road agency, Rosavtodor requested a tender to build a three-kilometer road-only bridge over the river connecting Yakutsk to the A360 Lena highway, expecting a cost of $1.7 bn/56 bn RUB, and a 6-year construction period. This was cancelled due to funding being transferred to the new Crimean Bridge.

In 2015, it was reported that Chinese interests, including the China Railway Construction Corporation, China Development Bank and four other Chinese construction companies, had expressed interest in financing the construction of the bridge. The head of Yakutia said in 2018 that construction could begin in 2020.

Construction eventually began on a road-only bridge in 2024, which is planned to be completed by 2028.

=== Eastwards ===
Future plans have been proposed for the extension of the railway line further to the east, towards the Kolyma region, Magadan and even Chukotka, and a Bering Strait crossing, which would link Russia with the United States. The Russian government in 2011 approved the construction of a US$65 billion Siberia-Alaska rail link and a tunnel across the Bering Strait.

Plans were announced in May 2012 by the governor of Magadan Oblast to extend the railway 1800 km eastwards of Yakutsk to Moma and onwards to Magadan with construction scheduled to begin in 2016, according to the President of Yakutia. In 2016 the railway project was included in the Federal railway development strategy plan until 2030.
