= Uchur =

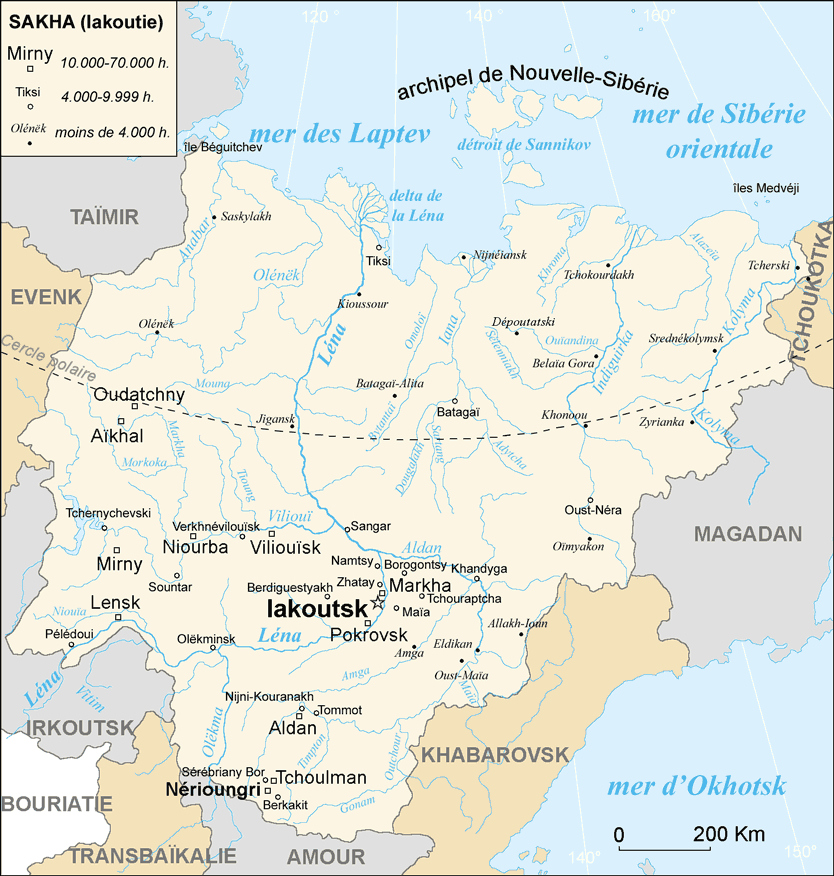

- Mouth location in Yakutia, Russia

Location
- Country: Russia

Physical characteristics
- Mouth: Aldan
  - coordinates: 58°47′33″N 130°35′55″E
- Length: 812 km (505 mi)
- Basin size: 113,000 km^{2} (44,000 sq mi)

Basin features
- Progression: Aldan→ Lena→ Laptev Sea

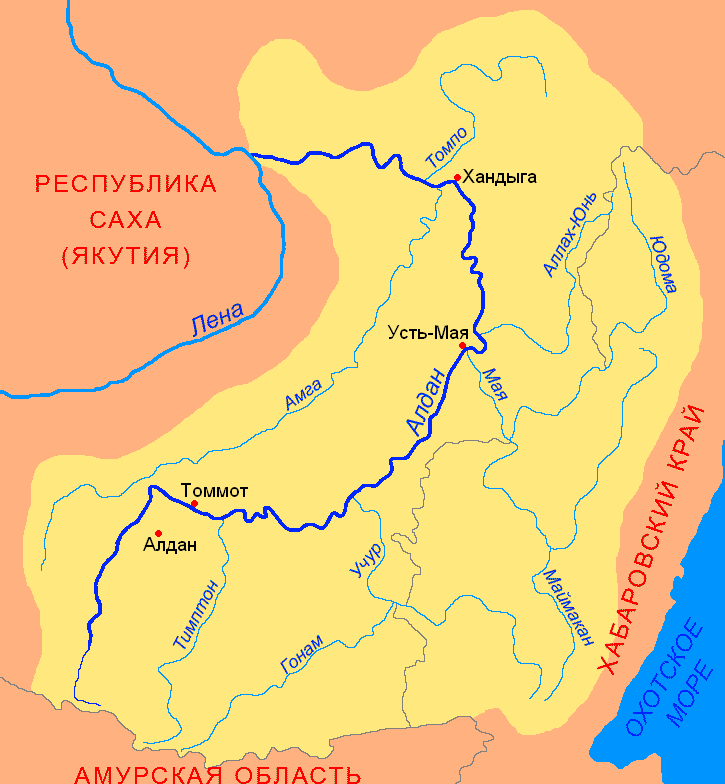
Map of the Aldan basin showing the Uchur

The Uchur (Russian: Учур; Yakut: Учур, Uçur) is a river in Khabarovsk Krai and Yakutia in Russia, a right tributary of the Aldan (Lena's basin). The length of the river is 812 kilometres (505 mi). The area of its drainage basin is 113,000 square kilometres (44,000 mi^{2}). The Uchur freezes in November and breaks up in May. Its main tributaries are the Uyan, Tyrkan, Gonam, and Gynym. The Gynym, a tributary of the Uchur, marks the southern border of the Sunnagyn Range.
