= Neryungri =

Town in Sakha Republic, Russia

Neryungri Нерюнгри
- Town under republic jurisdiction

Other transcription(s)
  - Yakut: Нүөрүҥгүрү
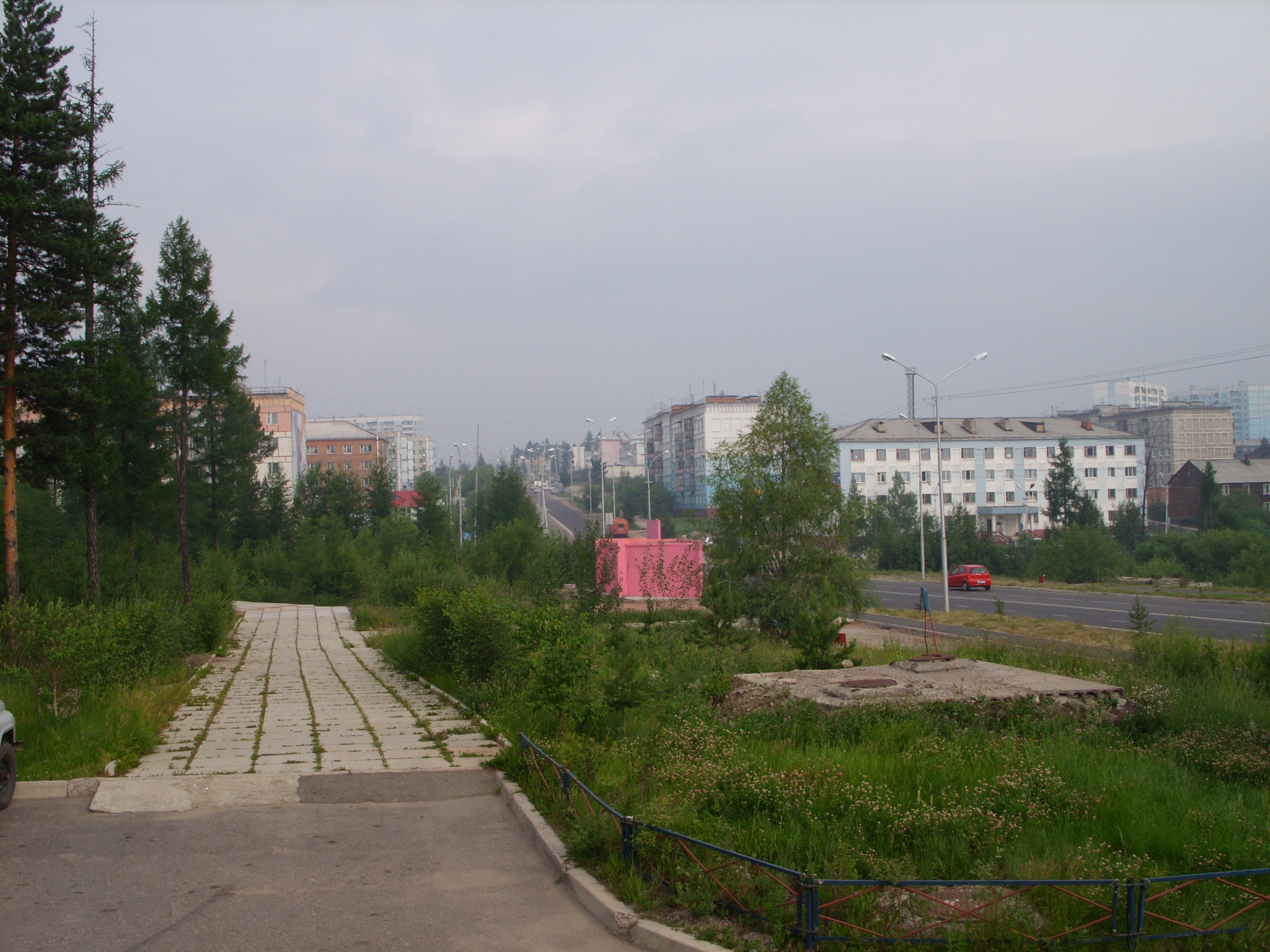
- Kravchenko Street in Neryungri

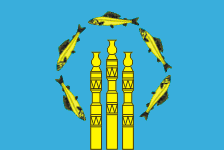
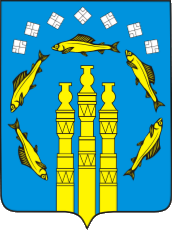
- Flag Coat of arms
- Interactive map of Neryungri
- Location of Neryungri Neryungri (Sakha Republic)
- Coordinates: 56°41′N 124°40′E
- Country: Russia
- Federal subject: Sakha Republic
- Administrative district: Neryungrinsky District
- TownSelsoviet: Neryungri
- Founded: 1975
- Town status since: 1975
- Elevation: 850 m (2,790 ft)

Population (2010 Census)
  - Total: 61,747
  - Estimate (2025): 53,366 (−13.6%)
  - Rank: 260th in 2010

Administrative status
  - Capital of: Neryungrinsky District, Town of Neryungri

Municipal status
  - Municipal district: Neryungrinsky Municipal District
  - Urban settlement: Neryungri Urban Settlement
  - Capital of: Neryungrinsky Municipal District, Neryungri Urban Settlement
- Time zone: UTC+
- Postal codes: 678960, 678962, 678965, 678967, 678985, 678999
- Dialing code: +7 41147
- OKTMO ID: 98660101001

Neryungri population
- 2010 Census: 61,747
- 2002 Census: 66,269
- 1989 Census: 72,540
- 1979 Census: 22,647

Neryungri (Russian: Нерюнгри, IPA: [ˈnʲerʲʊnɡrʲɪ]; Yakut: Нүөрүҥгүрү, romanized: Nüörüñgürü, [nyøɾyŋgyɾy]; Evenki: Нерунӈа, romanized: Nerunŋa) is the second largest town in the Sakha Republic, Russia and the administrative center of Neryungrinsky District. As of the 2010 Census, its population was 61,747.

== Etymology ==
The name of the town is believed to come from Evenki Ньируунгра nyuruungra, meaning "river of graylings".

== History ==
It was founded due to the development of the nearby coal basin and was granted town status in 1975.

== Administrative and municipal status ==
Within the framework of administrative divisions, Neryungri serves as the administrative center of Neryungrinsky District. As an inhabited locality, Neryungri is classified as a town under republic jurisdiction. As an administrative division, it is incorporated within Neryungrinsky District as the Town of Neryungri. As a municipal division, the Town of Neryungri is incorporated within Neryungrinsky Municipal District as Neryungri Urban Settlement.

== Economy ==
The town is the center of a large coal field discovered about 1970. It is located on the Amur–Yakutsk Mainline and the Lena Highway, 202 kilometers (126 mi) by rail north of Tynda. Nearby, all in the coal basin, are Berkakit: 10 kilometers (6.2 mi) south; Serebryany Bor: 8 kilometers (5.0 mi) east with a thermal coal power plant; Chulman: 30 kilometers (19 mi) north, with the Chulman Airport; and a large open pit coal mine northwest across the Chulman River.

== Climate ==
Neryungri has a subarctic climate (Köppen climate classification Dfc) bordering with wet summer subarctic climate Dwc with mild summers and severe winters. Precipitation is moderate, but is significantly higher in the summer than at other times of the year. The climate is extremely cold for the latitude in part due to the Siberian High bringing extremely cold polar air to the city in winters, whereas the relatively high elevation and proximity to the cold Sea of Okhotsk usually prevents the heat waves seen in lower areas of Sakha.

Climate data for Neryungri
Month	Jan	Feb	Mar	Apr	May	Jun	Jul	Aug	Sep	Oct	Nov	Dec	Year
Record high °C (°F)	−5.6 (21.9)	−1.2 (29.8)	7.4 (45.3)	17.6 (63.7)	28.1 (82.6)	34.6 (94.3)	34.8 (94.6)	33.1 (91.6)	26.3 (79.3)	17.7 (63.9)	4.6 (40.3)	−1.8 (28.8)	34.8 (94.6)
Mean daily maximum °C (°F)	−26.2 (−15.2)	−20.1 (−4.2)	−10.2 (13.6)	0.4 (32.7)	10.4 (50.7)	20.2 (68.4)	22.3 (72.1)	19.2 (66.6)	9.8 (49.6)	−2.7 (27.1)	−17.3 (0.9)	−26.7 (−16.1)	−1.7 (28.9)
Daily mean °C (°F)	−29.8 (−21.6)	−24.7 (−12.5)	−15.4 (4.3)	−4.5 (23.9)	5.0 (41.0)	13.9 (57.0)	16.5 (61.7)	13.3 (55.9)	4.8 (40.6)	−6.8 (19.8)	−21 (−6)	−30.1 (−22.2)	−6.6 (20.2)
Mean daily minimum °C (°F)	−33.2 (−27.8)	−29 (−20)	−20.7 (−5.3)	−9.6 (14.7)	0.0 (32.0)	7.9 (46.2)	11.2 (52.2)	8.1 (46.6)	0.4 (32.7)	−10.5 (13.1)	−24.6 (−12.3)	−33.4 (−28.1)	−11.1 (12.0)
Record low °C (°F)	−61 (−78)	−56.9 (−70.4)	−49.8 (−57.6)	−37 (−35)	−21.6 (−6.9)	−6.4 (20.5)	−3.7 (25.3)	−8 (18)	−18.9 (−2.0)	−38.7 (−37.7)	−50.8 (−59.4)	−57.9 (−72.2)	−61 (−78)
Average precipitation mm (inches)	15.7 (0.62)	12.6 (0.50)	15.6 (0.61)	30.8 (1.21)	59.7 (2.35)	82.0 (3.23)	111.9 (4.41)	95.0 (3.74)	84.7 (3.33)	52.5 (2.07)	27.3 (1.07)	16.5 (0.65)	604.3 (23.79)
