= Aldan =

Aldan may refer to:

== People ==
- Gille Aldan, the first bishop of Galloway, Scotland
- Andrey Aldan-Semenov (1908–1985), Russian writer
- Duke Aldan, a fictional character in Langrisser IV video game

== Places ==
- Aldan, Russia, a town in the Sakha Republic, Russia
- Aldan Urban Settlement, a municipal formation which incorporates the town of Aldan and two rural localities in Aldansky District of the Sakha Republic, Russia
- Aldan, Pennsylvania, a borough in Pennsylvania, United States
- Aldan Highlands in the Sakha Republic, Russia
- Aldan (river), a river in the Sakha Republic, Russia
- Aldan Shield, a geological region in Siberia, Russia
- Aldan Airport, an airport in the Sakha Republic, Russia
- Aldan mine, an iron mine in the Sakha Republic, Russia

== Other ==
- Aldan, computer in the science fiction fantasy novel "Monday Begins on Saturday" by Strugatsky brothers

== See also ==
- Alden (disambiguation)
- Clifton–Aldan (SEPTA station), a SEPTA station in Clifton Heights, Pennsylvania, United States
- Aldansky District, a district of the Sakha Republic, Russia
