= Yllymakh =

Yllymakh Ыллымах
- Selo
- Interactive map of Yllymakh
- Location of Yllymakh Yllymakh (Sakha Republic)
- Coordinates: 58°34′N 126°41′E
- Country: Russia
- Federal subject: Sakha Republic
- Administrative district: Aldansky District
- TownSelsoviet: Tommot
- Founded: 1942

Population (2010 Census)
  - Total: 472
  - Estimate (2021): 326 (−30.9%)

Municipal status
  - Municipal district: Aldansky Municipal District
  - Urban settlement: Tommot Urban Settlement
- Time zone: UTC+9 (UTC+09:00)
- Postal code: 678920
- OKTMO ID: 98603105106

Yllymakh (Russian: Ыллымах) is a rural locality (a selo), one of five settlements, in addition to Tommot, the administrative centre of the settlement, the Urban-type settlement of Bezymyanny, and the villages of Ulu and Verkhnyaya Amga in the Town of Tommot of Aldansky District in the Sakha Republic, Russia. It is located 150 kilometers (93 mi) from Aldan, the district centre and 75 kilometers (47 mi) from Tommot. Its population as of the 2010 Census was 472; down from 500 recorded in the 2002 Census.
