= Lebediny =

Lebediny (Russian: Лебединый; masculine), Lebedinaya (Лебединая; feminine), or Lebedinoye (Лебединое; neuter) is the name of several inhabited localities in Russia.

Urban localities

- Lebediny, Sakha Republic, a settlement in Aldansky District of the Sakha Republic

Rural localities

- Lebediny, Altai Krai, a settlement in Urozhayny Selsoviet of Sovetsky District of Altai Krai
- Lebedinoye, Chelyabinsk Oblast, a selo in Parizhsky Selsoviet of Nagaybaksky District of Chelyabinsk Oblast
- Lebedinoye, Khasansky District, a selo in Khasansky District of Primorsky Krai
- Lebedinoye, Spassky District, a selo in Spassky District of Primorsky Krai
