= Verkhnyaya Amga =

Verkhnyaya Amga Верхняя Амга
- Selo
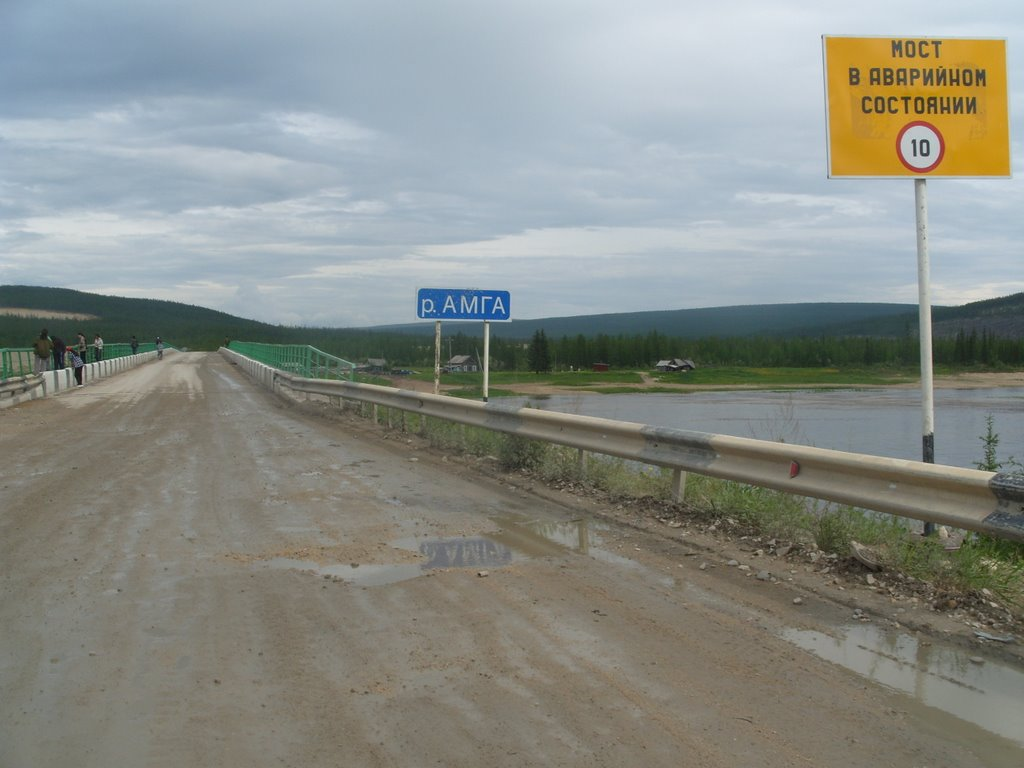
- Bridge over the Amga River with the village in the background
- Interactive map of Verkhnyaya Amga
- Location of Verkhnyaya Amga Verkhnyaya Amga (Sakha Republic)
- Coordinates: 59°38′N 127°07′E
- Country: Russia
- Federal subject: Sakha Republic
- Administrative district: Aldansky District
- TownSelsoviet: Tommot
- Founded: 1938
- Elevation: 277 m (909 ft)

Population (2010 Census)
  - Total: 27
  - Estimate (2021): 12 (−55.6%)

Municipal status
  - Municipal district: Aldansky Municipal District
  - Urban settlement: Tommot Urban Settlement
- Time zone: UTC+9 (UTC+09:00)
- Postal code: 678956
- OKTMO ID: 98603105111

Verkhnyaya Amga (Russian: Ве́рхняя Амга́, literally Upper Amga; Yakut: Үөһээ Амма, Üöhee Amma) is a rural locality (a selo), one of five settlements, in addition to Tommot, the administrative centre of the settlement, the Urban-type settlement of Bezymyanny, and the villages of Ulu and Yllymakh in the Town of Tommot of Aldansky District in the Sakha Republic, Russia. It is located 186 kilometers (116 mi) from Aldan, the district centre and 111 kilometers (69 mi) from Tommot. Its population as of the 2010 Census was 27; up from 19 recorded in the 2002 Census.

== Geography ==
It is located on the right bank of the Amga River. The village is the location of road and rail bridges over the Amga River, carrying the highway to Yakutsk and the Amur–Yakutsk Mainline railway. It is served by a railway station, named simply Amga. The village was founded in 1938 as a service point during the construction of the highway to Yakutsk.
