= Alden (name) =

Alden as both a given name and a surname originated in the Old English language. The name can derive from Ealdwine (meaning "old friend") or (in the Scottish Borders) from Healfdene.

== People with the surname ==
- Alvin Alden (1818–1882), American politician
- Blanche Ray Alden (1870–1934), American musician and composer
- Charles E. Alden, American inventor
- Charles Henry Alden (1836–1906), American military officer
- Chris Alden, American entrepreneur
- Christopher Alden (director) (born 1944), American theatre director
- Cynthia May Alden (1862–1931), American journalist, author, and municipal employee
- David Alden (born 1949), American theatre and film director
- Edward Alden (born 1961), American-Canadian journalist and policy analyst
- Emily Gilmore Alden (1834–1914), American author and educator
- George I. Alden (1843–1926), American mechanical engineer and educator
- Ginger Alden, American actress and model
- Harold Alden (1890–1964), American astronomer
- Henry Mills Alden (1836–1919), American author and publication editor
- Howard Alden (born 1958), American jazz guitarist
- Ichabod Alden (1739–1778), American military officer
- Isabella Macdonald Alden (1841–1930), American author
- James Alden Jr. (1810–1877), American military officer
- Jerome Alden (1921–1997), American playwright, father of Christopher Alden and David Alden
- John Alden (c. 1598–1687), one of the Pilgrims on the Mayflower
- John Alden (sailor) (c. 1626–1702), American military officer, son of John Alden and Priscilla Alden
- John Richard Alden (1908–1991), American historian
- Joseph Alden (1807–1885), American scholar, educator, and author
- Kay Alden (born 1946), American television writer
- Lucy Morris Chaffee Alden (1836–1912), American author, educator, and hymn writer
- Mary Alden (1883–1946), American actress
- Norman Alden (1924–2012), American actor
- Priscilla Alden (c. 1602–1685), one of the Pilgrims on the Mayflower, wife of John Alden and mother of John Alden Jr.
- Raymond Macdonald Alden (1873–1924), American scholar and educator
- Raymond W. Alden III, American educator and academic administrator
- Roy Alden (1863–1937), American newspaper editor and politician
- Timothy Alden (educator) (1771–1839)), American clergyman and academic administrator
- Timothy Alden (politician) (born 1991), Maltese politician
- Scott Alden (1907–1977), American law enforcement official, lawyer, college professor, and college athletics head coach
- Vernon Roger Alden, American academic administrator
- William L. Alden (1837–1908), American journalist and writer

== People with the given name ==
- Alden Aaroe (1918–1993), American broadcast journalist and announcer
- Alden Anderson (1867–1944), American politician
- Alden G. Barber (1919–2003), American scouting executive
- Alden Brock (c. 2002–2015), American flooding victim
- Alden Brown (born 1957), also known as Peter North, Canadian pornographic actor, film director, and film producer
- Alden Carter (born 1947), American author
- Alden W. Clausen (1923–2013), American businessman
- Alden Partridge Colvocoresses (1918–2007), American military officer and cartographer
- Alden B. Dow (1904–1983), American architect
- Alden Ehrenreich (born 1989), American actor
- Alden Jenks (born 1940), American composer
- Alden Knipe (1870–1950), American football player and coach
- Alden McLaughlin (born 1961), Cayman Islands politician
- Alden H. Miller (1906–1965), American ornithologist, zoologist, and museum director
- Alden Nowlan (1933–1983), Canadian poet, novelist, playwright, and journalist
- Alden Partridge (1785–1854), American author, legislator, military officer, and surveyor
- Alden Pasche (1910–1986), American basketball coach
- Alden Penner (born 1983), Canadian musician, songwriter, and businessman
- Alden Richards (born 1992), Filipino actor, host, model, and recording artist
- Alden Roche (1945–2022), American football player
- Alden Sanborn (1899–1991), American rower
- Alden Thompson, American theologian
- Alden Whitman (1913–1990), American journalist

== People with the middle name ==
- Don Alden Adams (1925–2019), American clergyman
- Neil Alden Armstrong (1930–2012), first man on the moon, American naval officer, test pilot, astronaut, and educator
- Vaughan Alden Bass, American painter
- Benjamin Alden Bidlack (1804–1849), American politician
- Charles Alden Black (1919–2005), American businessman, aquaculturalist, and oceanographer
- John Alden Carpenter (1876–1951), American composer
- Henry Alden Clark (1850–1944), American politician
- Stuart Alden Cook (born 1945), American musician
- John Alden Dix (1860–1928), American politician
- Walter Alden Dyer (1878–1943), American author and journalist
- John Alden Mason (1885–1967), American anthropologist, linguist, and curator
- Daniel Alden Reed (1875–1959), American football player, American football coach, and politician
- Phil Alden Robinson (born 1950), American film director and screenwriter
- William Alden Smith (1859–1932), American politician
- Elizabeth Alden Stam (1906–1934), American religious missionary
- J. Alden Weir (1852–1919), American painter
- Harold Alden Wheeler (1903–1996), American engineer

== Fictional people ==
- Alden (The Walking Dead), a character in the horror drama television series The Walking Dead
- The Alden family, four siblings of which are the main characters of The Boxcar Children novel series
- The Alden family, one of the two main families portrayed in the American soap opera Loving
- James Alden, the main character in the 1931 American film The Millionaire
- Oliver Alden, the main character in the novel The Last Puritan
- Rev. Robert Alden, a character in the American television drama series Little House on the Prairie
- Roberta Alden, a character in the novel An American Tragedy
- Terri Alden, a character in the American television sitcom series Three's Company
- Thomas and Amy Alden, father and daughter that are main characters in the American film Fly Away Home
- Alden Jones, a character in the Canadian television cartoon series Braceface
- Alden Pyle, a character in the novel The Quiet American
- Alden, a secondary main villain and boss from the game inFamous
- Alden Dedrick Vacker, a character in the Keeper Of The Lost Cities book series by Shannon Messenger
- Alden Carruthers, a character from the game Red Dead Redemption 2
- Alden Kupferberg, a character in The Wolf of Wall Street (2013 film)

== Aldén surname ==
Aldén is a nearly homonymic surname that seems to be of Swedish or other Scandinavian origin, apparently unrelated to the English Alden surname. Among people with the Aldén surname are:

- Sebastian Aldén (born 1985), Swedish motorcycle racer
- Sonja Aldén (born 1977), English-Swedish singer-songwriter

== See also ==
- Alden (disambiguation)
