= Kuranakh =

Kuranakh may refer to:

- Kuranakh-Sala, a settlement in the Sakha Republic, Russia
- Verkhny Kuranakh, a settlement in the Sakha Republic, Russia
- Nizhny Kuranakh, a settlement in the Sakha Republic, Russia
- Kuranakh-Yuryakh, a river in the Sakha Republic, Russia
- Kuranakh-Siktyakh, a river in the Sakha Republic, Russia
- Kuranakh mine
