= ADH =

ADH may refer to:

== Organizations ==
- Aalborg DH, a Danish handball club
- Air One, an Italian airline

== Science ==
- Adipic acid dihydrazide, a chemical compound
- Alcohol dehydrogenase, an enzyme
- Antidiuretic hormone or vasopressin
- Atypical ductal hyperplasia, a lesion of the breast

== Transportation infrastructure ==
- Ada Municipal Airport, Oklahoma, US
- Aldan Airport in Sakha Republic, Russia (IATA airport code ADH)
- Andheri railway station, Mumbai, India

== Other uses ==
- Adhola dialect of Southern Luo, spoken in Uganda
