= Orochen 2-y =

Orochen 2-y Орочен 2-й
- Selo
- Interactive map of Orochen 2-y
- Location of Orochen 2-y Orochen 2-y (Sakha Republic)
- Coordinates: 58°32′N 125°23′E
- Country: Russia
- Federal subject: Sakha Republic
- Administrative district: Aldansky District
- TownSelsoviet: Aldan

Population (2010 Census)
  - Total: 18
  - Estimate (2021): 6 (−66.7%)

Municipal status
  - Municipal district: Aldansky Municipal District
  - Urban settlement: Aldan Urban Settlement
- Time zone: UTC+9 (UTC+09:00)
- Postal code: 678900
- OKTMO ID: 98603101106

Orochen 2-y (Russian: Орочен 2-й) is a rural locality (a selo), one of three settlements, in addition to Aldan, the administrative centre of the settlement and Bolshoy Nimnyr in the Town of Aldan of Olyokminsky District in the Sakha Republic, Russia. It is located 5 kilometers (3.1 mi) from Aldan. Its population as of the 2010 Census was 16; down from 29 recorded in the 2002 Census.
