= Leninsky Urban Settlement, Sakha Republic =

Leninsky Urban Settlement (Russian: городско́е поселе́ние «посёлок Ле́нинский») is a municipal formation (an urban settlement) in Aldansky Municipal District of the Sakha Republic, Russia, one of the four urban settlements in the district. Its territory comprises the territories of two administrative divisions of Aldansky District—the Settlement of Leninsky (which, in addition to Leninsky, contains one rural locality—the selo of Yakokut) and the Settlement of Lebediny (which, in addition to Lebediny, contains one rural locality—the selo of Orochen 1-y).
