= Alden =

Alden may refer to:

== Places ==
=== United States ===
- Alden, California, a former settlement
- Alden, Illinois
- Alden, Iowa
- Alden, Kansas
- Alden, Michigan
- Alden, Minnesota
- Alden, Oklahoma
- Alden, Pennsylvania
- Alden, New York, the most populous Alden in the US
  - Alden (village), New York
- Alden, Wisconsin
- Alden, Virginia
- Alden Township, McHenry County, Illinois
- Alden Township, Freeborn County, Minnesota
- Alden Township, St. Louis County, Minnesota
- Alden Township, Hettinger County, North Dakota
- Alden Township, Hand County, South Dakota

=== Elsewhere ===
- Alden (crater), on the Moon
- Alden, Norway, a small island in Sogn og Fjordane county
- 2941 Alden, an asteroid
- Alden Valley, Lancashire, England

== Other uses ==
- Alden (name)
- Alden House (disambiguation), various houses on the National Register of Historic Places
- Alden Research Laboratory, a hydraulic laboratory in Massachusetts
- Alden Rowing
- Alden Shoe Company, a men's shoemaker in Middleborough, Massachusetts
- Alden v. Maine, a 1999 US Supreme Court case
- USS Alden, a US Navy destroyer
