= List of After Words interviews first aired in 2016 =

After Words is an American television series on the C-SPAN2 network’s weekend programming schedule known as Book TV. The program is an hour-long talk show, each week featuring an interview with the author of a new nonfiction book. The program has no regular host. Instead, each author is paired with a guest host who is familiar with the author or the subject matter of their book.

First air date (links to video)	Interviewee(s)	Interviewer(s)	Book	Topic of interview / comments
January 2, 2016	Karl Rove	Richard Brookhiser	The Triumph of William McKinley: Why the Election of 1896 Still Matters	William McKinley, William McKinley presidential campaign, 1896, 1896 United States presidential election
January 9, 2016	James Rosen	Dana Perino	Cheney One on One: A Candid Conversation with America’s Most Controversial Statesman	Dick Cheney
January 16, 2016	Mei Fong	Evan Osnos	One Child: The Story of China’s Most Radical Experiment	One-child policy
January 23, 2016	Tom Daschle and Trent Lott	J.C. Watts	Crisis Point: Why We Must-and How We Can-Overcome Our Broken Politics in Washington and Across America	
January 30, 2016	Eddie Glaude	Marc Morial	Democracy in Black: How Race Still Enslaves the American Soul	
February 6, 2016	Matt Lewis	S. E. Cupp	Too Dumb to Fail: How the GOP Betrayed the Reagan Revolution to Win Elections (and How It Can Reclaim Its Conservative Roots)	
February 13, 2016	Barry Latzer	Samuel Bieler	The Rise and Fall of Violent Crime in America	
February 20, 2016	Cory Booker	Robert A. George	United: Thoughts on Finding Common Ground and Advancing the Common Good	
February 27, 2016	Michael Hayden	James Woolsey	Playing to the Edge: American Intelligence in the Age of Terror	
March 5, 2016	E. J. Dionne	Juan Williams	Why the Right Went Wrong: Conservatism From Goldwater to the Tea Party and Beyond	
March 12, 2016	Michael Eric Dyson	April Ryan	The Black Presidency: Barack Obama and the Politics of Race in America	
March 19, 2016	John Yoo	Victoria Toensing	Liberty’s Nemesis: The Unchecked Expansion of the State	
March 26, 2016	Nancy Cohen	Kim Azzarelli	Breakthrough: The Making of America's First Woman President	
April 2, 2016	Mary Frances Berry	Spencer Overton	Five Dollars and a Pork Chop Sandwich: Vote Buying and the Corruption of Democracy	
April 9, 2016	J.C. Watts	Kevin Merida	Dig Deep: 7 Truths to Finding Strength Within	
April 16, 2016	Ellen Malcolm	Maxine Waters	When Women Win: Emily’s List and the Rise of Women in American Politics	EMILY's List
April 23, 2016	Sue Klebold	Mary Giliberti	A Mother’s Reckoning: Living in the Aftermath of Tragedy	
April 30, 2016	Steve Case	John Delaney	The Third Wave: An Entrepreneur's Vision of the Future	
May 7, 2016	Peter Marks	Bethany McLean	Good for the Money: My Fight to Pay Back America	Bob Benmosche, American International Group
May 14, 2016	Don Watkins	Diana Furchtgott-Roth	Equal Is Unfair: America’s Misguided Fight Against Income Inequality	
May 21, 2016	Shaka Senghor	Paul Butler	Writing My Wrongs: Life, Death and Redemption in an American Prison	
May 28, 2016	Tamara Draut	Amy Goodman	Sleeping Giant: How the New Working Class Will Transform America	
June 4, 2016	Mitch McConnell	Lamar Alexander	The Long Game: A Memoir	
June 11, 2016	Barbara Boxer	Amy Klobuchar	The Art of Tough: Fearlessly Facing Politics and Life	
June 18, 2016	Fawaz Gerges	Geneive Abdo	ISIS: A History	Islamic State of Iraq and the Levant
June 25, 2016	Pamela Haag	William Doyle	The Gunning of America: Business and the Making of American Gun Culture	
July 2, 2016	Nathalia Holt	Lisa Rand	Rise of the Rocket Girls: The Women Who Propelled Us, from Missiles to the Moon to Mars	
July 9, 2016	Heather Mac Donald	Delores Jones-Brown	The War on Cops: How the New Attack on Law and Order Makes Everyone Less Safe	
July 16, 2016	Darrell Issa	Tom Davis	Watchdog: The Real Stories Behind the Headlines from the Congressman Who Exposed Washington’s Biggest Scandals	
July 23, 2016	Karen Greenberg	Ali Soufan	Rogue Justice: The Making of the Security State	
July 30, 2016	Eric Fair	Raha Wala	Consequence: A Memoir	Abu Ghraib prison, Abu Ghraib torture and prisoner abuse
August 6, 2016	Kimberley Strassel	Ginni Thomas	The Intimidation Game: How the Left Is Silencing Free Speech	
August 13, 2016	Dana Loesch	Guy Benson	Flyover Nation: You Can’t Run a Country You’ve Never Been To	
August 20, 2016	Seymour Hersh	Bob Dreyfuss	The Killing of Osama bin Laden	Death of Osama bin Laden
August 27, 2016	Ann Coulter	Tucker Carlson	In Trump We Trust: E Pluribus Awesome!	Donald Trump presidential campaign, 2016
September 3, 2016	Rosa Brooks	Kathleen Hicks	How Everything Became War and the Military Became Everything: Tales from the Pentagon	
September 10, 2016	Alberto Gonzales	Brent Kendall	True Faith and Allegiance: A Story of Service and Sacrifice in War and Peace	
September 17, 2016	Mark Thompson	Arianna Huffington	Enough Said: What’s Gone Wrong with the Language of Politics?	
September 24, 2016	Dave Brat	Ed Gillespie	American Underdog: Proof That Principles Matter	
October 1, 2016	John Dickerson	Clarence Page	Whistlestop: My Favorite Stories from Presidential Campaign History	
October 8, 2016	Mary Thompson-Jones	Paula Dobriansky	To the Secretary: Leaked Embassy Cables and America’s Foreign Policy Disconnect	
October 15, 2016	Sara Goldrick-Rab	Lisa Coico	Paying the Price: College Costs, Financial Aid, and the Betrayal of the American Dream	
October 22, 2016	Julissa Arce	Doris Meissner	My (Underground) American Dream: My True Story as an Undocumented Immigrant Who Became a Wall Street Executive	
October 29, 2016	Tim Wu	Jon Fortt	The Attention Merchants: The Epic Scramble to Get Inside Our Heads	
November 5, 2016	Edward Conard	N. Gregory Mankiw	The Upside of Inequality: How Good Intentions Undermine the Middle Class	
November 12, 2016	George Borjas	Edward Alden	We Wanted Workers: Unraveling the Immigration Narrative	
November 19, 2016	Sebastian Mallaby	Alice Rivlin	The Man who Knew: The Life and Times of Alan Greenspan	Alan Greenspan
November 26, 2016	Gary Younge	Juleyka Lantigua-Williams	Another Day in the Death of America: A Chronicle of Ten Short Lives	
December 3, 2016	George Mitchell	Jane Harman	A Path to Peace: A Brief History of Israeli-Palestinian Negotiations and a Way Forward in the Middle East	Israeli–Palestinian peace process
December 10, 2016	Eugene Soltes	Robert Khuzami	Why They Do It: Inside the Mind of the White-Collar Criminal	White-collar crime
December 17, 2016	Jason Brennan	David Boaz	Against Democracy	
December 24, 2016	Ellen Silbergeld	Dan Glickman	Chickenizing Farms and Food: How Industrial Meat Production Endangers Workers, Animals, and Consumers	
December 31, 2016	Joann Lublin	Jay Newton-Small	Earning It: Hard-Won Lessons from Trailblazing Women at the Top of the Business World	
