= Yakokit =

Yakokit Якокит
- Selo
- Interactive map of Yakokit
- Location of Yakokit Yakokit (Sakha Republic)
- Coordinates: 58°53′N 125°50′E
- Country: Russia
- Federal subject: Sakha Republic
- Administrative district: Aldansky District
- Urban-type settlementSelsoviet: Nizhny Kuranakh
- Founded: 1931

Population (2010 Census)
  - Total: 328
  - Estimate (2021): 201 (−38.7%)

Municipal status
  - Municipal district: Aldansky Municipal District
  - Urban settlement: Nizhny Kuranakh Urban Settlement
- Time zone: UTC+9 (UTC+09:00)
- Postal code: 678952
- OKTMO ID: 98603170111

Yakokit (Russian: Якокит) is a rural locality (a selo), one of three settlements, in addition to the Urban-type settlement of Nizhny Kuranakh, the administrative centre of the settlement, and the village of Verkhny Kuranakh in the settlement of Nizhny Kuranakh of Aldansky District in the Sakha Republic, Russia. It is located 47 kilometers (29 mi) from Aldan, the district centre and 17 kilometers (11 mi) from Nizhny Kuranakh. Its population as of the 2010 Census was 328; down from 397 recorded in the 2002 Census.
