= Orochen 1-y =

Orochen 1-y Орочен 1-й
- Selo
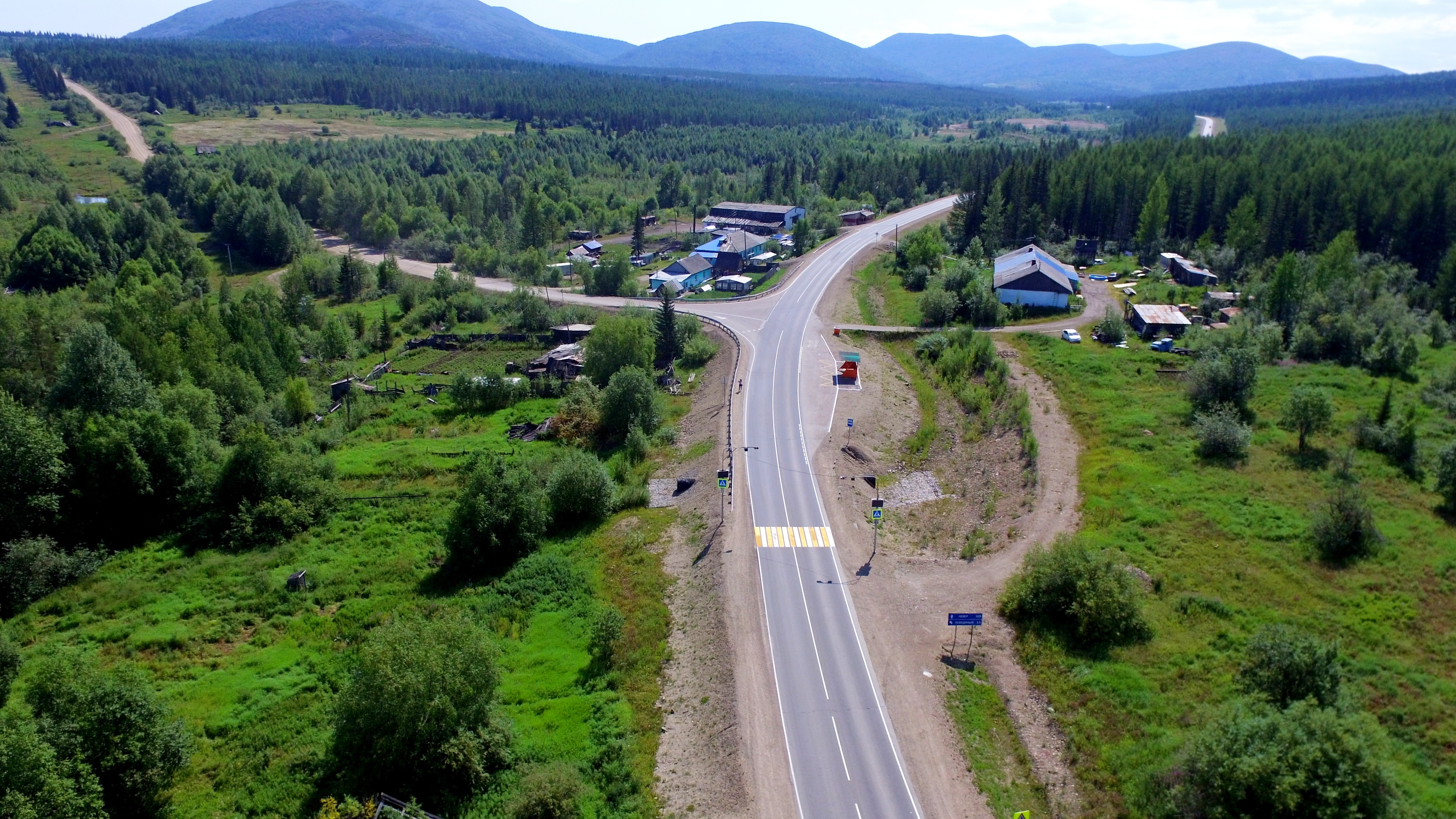
- View of the locality
- Interactive map of Orochen 1-y
- Location of Orochen 1-y Orochen 1-y (Sakha Republic)
- Coordinates: 58°29′N 125°25′E
- Country: Russia
- Federal subject: Sakha Republic
- Administrative district: Aldansky District
- Urban-type settlementSelsoviet: Leninsky
- Founded: 1927

Population
  - Estimate (2002): 42 )

Municipal status
  - Municipal district: Aldansky Municipal District
  - Urban settlement: Leninsky Urban Settlement
- Time zone: UTC+9 (UTC+09:00)
- Postal code: 678900
- OKTMO ID: 98603161106

Orochen 1-y (Russian: Орочен 1-й) is a rural locality (a selo), one of four settlements, in addition to the Urban-type settlements of Leninsky, the administrative centre of the settlement, and Lebediny, and the village of Yakokut in the Leninsky Urban Settlement of Aldansky District in the Sakha Republic, Russia. It is located 23 kilometers (14 mi) from Aldan and 5 kilometers (3.1 mi) from Leninsky. Its population as of the 2002 Census was 42.
