= Yalden =

Yalden is a surname. The name is derived from the prefix Y- being added to the name Alden.

Notable people with this surname includes:

- Derek Yalden, (1940–2013), English zoologist and honorary reader at the University of Manchester;
- Max Yalden (born 1930), Canadian civil servant and diplomat;
- Thomas Yalden (1670–1736), English poet and translator; and
- William Yalden (1740–1824), English cricketer.
