= Khatystyr =

Khatystyr Хатыстыр
- Selo
- Interactive map of Khatystyr
- Location of Khatystyr Khatystyr (Sakha Republic)
- Coordinates: 58°55′N 125°09′E
- Country: Russia
- Federal subject: Sakha Republic
- Administrative district: Aldansky District
- Rural okrugSelsoviet: Belletsky Evenk National Rural Okrug

Population (2010 Census)
  - Total: 1,385
  - Estimate (2021): 1,437 (+3.8%)

Administrative status
  - Capital of: Belletsky Evenk National Rural Okrug

Municipal status
  - Municipal district: Aldansky Municipal District
  - Rural settlement: Belletsky Evenk National Rural Settlement
  - Capital of: Belletsky Evenk National Rural Settlement
- Time zone: UTC+9 (UTC+09:00)
- Postal code: 678930
- OKTMO ID: 98603407101

Khatystyr (Russian: Хатыстыр; Yakut: Хатыыстыыр, Xatııstıır) is a rural locality (a selo), the administrative centre of and one of two settlements, in addition to Ugoyan, in Belletsky Evenk National Rural Okrug of Aldansky District in the Sakha Republic, Russia. It is located 60 kilometers (37 mi) from Aldan, the administrative center of the district. Its population as of the 2010 Census was 1,385; up from 1,308 recorded in the 2002 Census.
