= Kutana, Aldansky District, Sakha Republic =

Kutana Кутана
- Selo
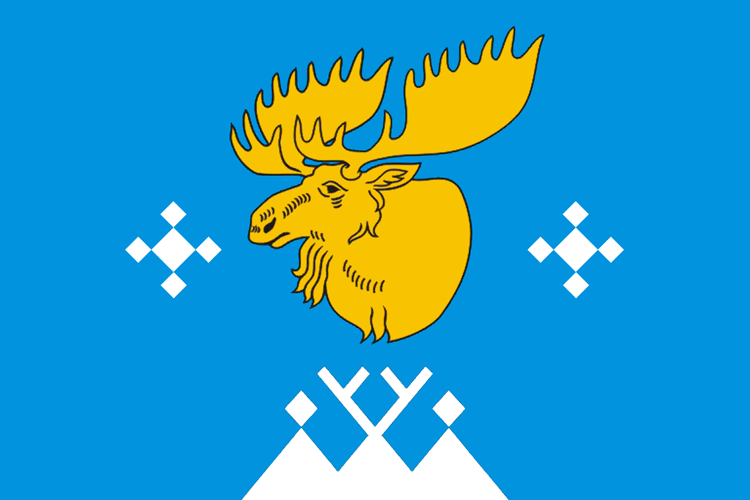
- Flag
- Interactive map of Kutana
- Location of Kutana Kutana (Sakha Republic)
- Coordinates: 59°01′N 131°46′E
- Country: Russia
- Federal subject: Sakha Republic
- Administrative district: Aldansky District
- Rural okrugSelsoviet: Anaminsky National Rural Okrug

Population (2010 Census)
  - Total: 658
  - Estimate (January 2016): 550 (−16.4%)

Administrative status
  - Capital of: Anaminsky National Rural Okrug

Municipal status
  - Municipal district: Aldansky Municipal District
  - Rural settlement: Anaminsky National Rural Settlement
  - Capital of: Anaminsky National Rural Settlement
- Time zone: UTC+9 (UTC+09:00)
- Postal codes: 678916, 678921
- OKTMO ID: 98603404101

Kutana (Russian: Кутана) is a rural locality (a selo), the only inhabited locality, and the administrative center of Anaminsky National Rural Okrug of Aldansky District in the Sakha Republic, Russia, located 580 kilometers (360 mi) from Aldan, the administrative center of the district. Its population as of the 2010 Census was 576, of whom 318 were male and 255 female, down from 658 as recorded during the 2002 Census.
