= Ugoyan =

Ugoyan Угоян
- Selo
- Interactive map of Ugoyan
- Location of Ugoyan Ugoyan (Sakha Republic)
- Coordinates: 59°15′N 125°17′E
- Country: Russia
- Federal subject: Sakha Republic
- Administrative district: Aldansky District
- Rural okrugSelsoviet: Belletsky Rural Okrug

Population (2010 Census)
  - Total: 375
  - Estimate (2021): 291 (−22.4%)

Municipal status
  - Municipal district: Aldansky Municipal District
  - Rural settlement: Belletsky Rural Settlement
- Time zone: UTC+9 (UTC+09:00)
- Postal code: 678931
- OKTMO ID: 98603407106

Ugoyan (Russian: Угоян) is a rural locality (a selo) in Belletsky Rural Okrug of Aldansky District in the Sakha Republic, Russia, located 77 kilometers (48 mi) from Aldan, the administrative center of the district, and 17 kilometers (11 mi) from Khatystyr, the administrative center of the rural okrug. Its population as of the 2010 Census was 375; up from 308 recorded in the 2002 Census.
