= Chagda, Aldansky District, Sakha Republic =

Rural locality (selo) in Sakha Republic, Russia

Chagda Чагда
- Selo
- Interactive map of Chagda
- Location of Chagda Chagda (Sakha Republic)
- Coordinates: 58°45′N 130°36′E
- Country: Russia
- Federal subject: Sakha Republic
- Administrative district: Aldansky District
- Rural okrugSelsoviet: Chagdinsky Rural Okrug
- Rural locality status since: May 18, 2001

Population (2010 Census)
  - Total: 218
  - Estimate (January 2016): 186 (−14.7%)

Administrative status
  - Capital of: Chagdinsky Rural Okrug

Municipal status
  - Municipal district: Aldansky Municipal District
  - Rural settlement: Chagdinsky Rural Settlement
  - Capital of: Chagdinsky Rural Settlement
- Time zone: UTC+9 (UTC+09:00)
- Postal code: 678915
- OKTMO ID: 98603460101

Chagda (Russian: Чагда) is a rural locality (a selo), the only inhabited locality, and the administrative center of Chagdinsky Rural Okrug of Aldansky District in the Sakha Republic, Russia, located 380 kilometers (240 mi) from Aldan, the administrative center of the district. Its population as of the 2010 Census was 218, down from 368 recorded during the 2002 Census and 682 recorded during the 1989 Census.

== Geography ==
Chagda is located on the banks of the Aldan River, east of the mouth of the Yungyuele.

== History ==
Chagda had urban status until May 18, 2001.
