= KADH =

KADH may refer to:

- Ada Municipal Airport (ICAO code KADH)
- KJJC (AM), a radio station (1230 AM) licensed to serve Murray, Utah, United States, which held the call sign KADH in 2017
- α-ketoacid dehydrogenase complexes (KADH), which are pyruvate dehydrogenase (PDH), α-ketoglutarate dehydrogenase (KGDH) and branched chain α-keto acid dehydrogenase (BCDH).
