= Charles Alden =

Charles Alden may refer to:

- Charles E. Alden (fl. 1906), obscure inventor who was claimed to have created the idea of a vest pocket telephone
- Charles Henry Alden (1836–1906), member of the United States Medical Corps
- Ted Ray (comedian) (1905–1977), English comedian, born Charles Olden
