= Verkhny Kuranakh =

Verkhny Kuranakh Верхний Куранах
- Selo
- Interactive map of Verkhny Kuranakh
- Location of Verkhny Kuranakh Verkhny Kuranakh (Sakha Republic)
- Coordinates: 58°45′N 125°29′E
- Country: Russia
- Federal subject: Sakha Republic
- Administrative district: Aldansky District
- Urban-type settlementSelsoviet: Nizhny Kuranakh

Population (2010 Census)
  - Total: 577
  - Estimate (2021): 432 (−25.1%)

Municipal status
  - Municipal district: Aldansky Municipal District
  - Urban settlement: Nizhny Kuranakh Urban Settlement
- Time zone: UTC+9 (UTC+09:00)
- Postal code: 678950
- OKTMO ID: 98603170106

Verkhny Kuranakh (Russian: Верхний Куранах) is a rural locality (a selo), one of three settlements, in addition to the Urban-type settlement of Nizhny Kuranakh, the administrative centre of the settlement, and Yakokit in the settlement of Nizhny Kuranakh of Aldansky District in the Sakha Republic, Russia. It is located 26 kilometers (16 mi) from Aldan, the district centre and 4 kilometers (2.5 mi) from Nizhny Kuranakh. Its population as of the 2010 Census was 577; down from 658 recorded in the 2002 Census.
