= Alden House =

Alden House may refer to:

In the United States

- Alden House (Bentonville, Arkansas), listed on the NRHP in Arkansas
- Ebenezer Alden House, Union, ME, listed on the NRHP in Maine
- John and Priscilla Alden Family Sites, Duxbury, MA, listed on the NRHP in Massachusetts
- Arthur Alden House, Quincy, MA, listed on the NRHP in Massachusetts
- William E. Alden House, Southbridge, MA, listed on the NRHP in Massachusetts
