= Raymond Alden =

Raymond Alden may refer to:

- Raymond Macdonald Alden (1873–1924), American scholar and educator
- Raymond W. Alden III, American university provost
