= Alden-Delehanty Block =

- Alden–Delehanty Block
- U.S. National Register of Historic Places
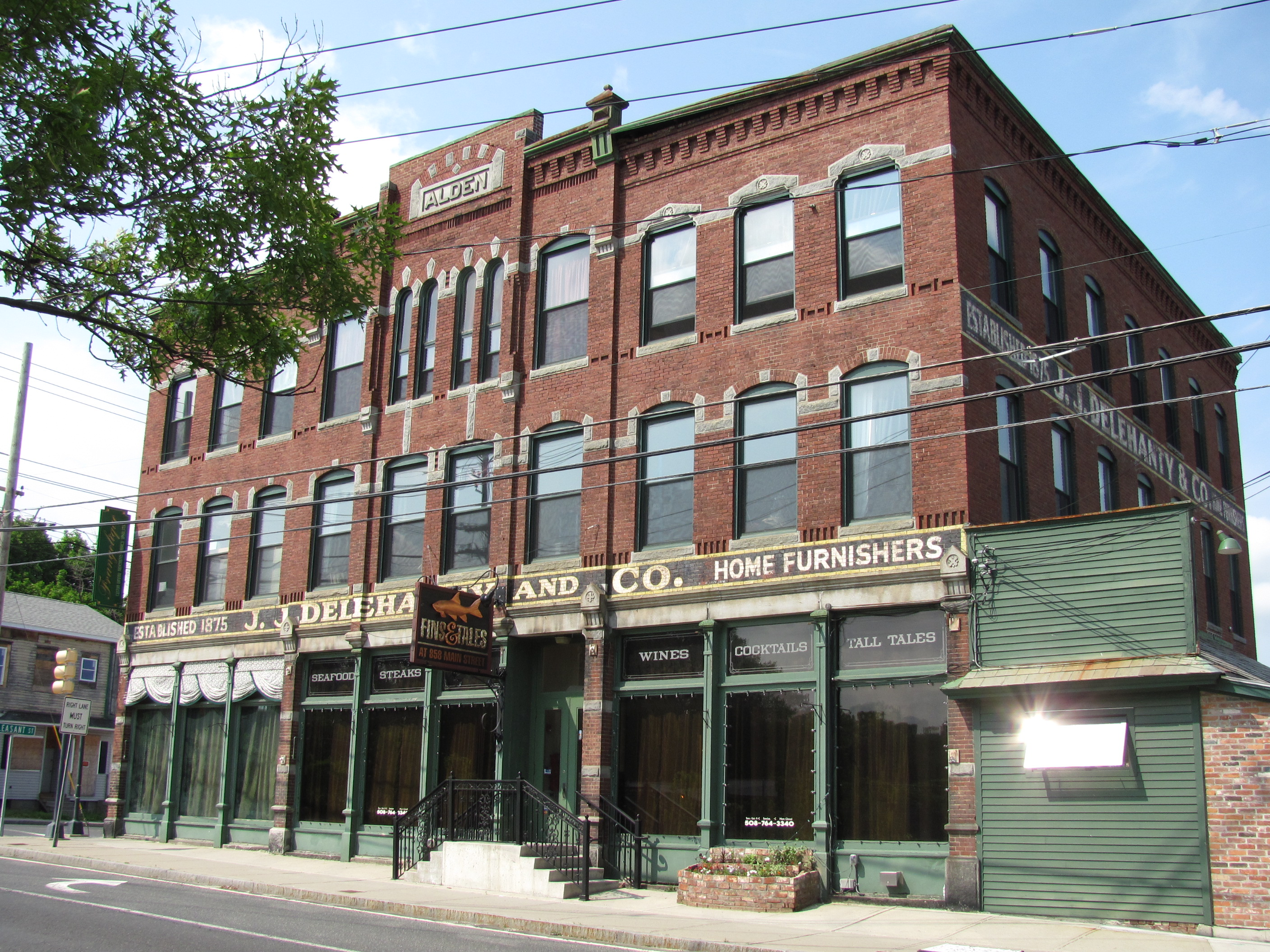
- Alden-Delehanty Block

- Location within Massachusetts Location within the United States
- Location: 858 Main St., Southbridge, Massachusetts
- Coordinates: 42°4′54″N 72°2′46″W
- Area: less than one acre
- Built: 1878
- Architectural style: Gothic, High Victorian Gothic
- MPS: Southbridge MRA
- NRHP reference No.: 89000572
- Added to NRHP: June 22, 1989

The Alden-Delehanty Block is a historic commercial block at 858 Main Street in Southbridge, Massachusetts. Completed in 1888, it is the largest commercial building built in the town's Globe Village area, and is one of its most imposing Victorian edifices. The building was added to the National Register of Historic Places in 1989.

== Description and history ==
The Alden-Delehanty Block is the largest of the modest collection of 19th and 20th-century commercial buildings that make up Globe Village. It is located on the north side of Main Street (Massachusetts Route 131) at its junction with Pleasant Street. It is three stories in height, built out red brick with stone trim. Its ground floor is divided into three now-unified store fronts, separated by brick piers with some stone elements. Each storefront has three plateglass windows, with entrance gained via the main building entrance. The upper floors have eleven window bays, those on the second floor set in segmented-arch openings with stone shoulders and keystones. The windows in the outer bays on the third floor are set in rectangular openings with peaked lintels, while two of the center three bays have narrow paired round-arch windows. The last bay, above the main entrance, matches those on the second floor. The building has a corbelled brickwork cornice, and a stepped parapet above the central bays, with a panel bearing the name Alden.

The block was built in 1888 for William E. Alden, who operated a dry goods store on the first floor. The building originally housed shops on the ground floor, offices on the second, and a meeting hall space on the third floor. The latter was used for a time by the Ancient Order of Hibernians, and has been known as Hibernia Hall. The building was acquired in 1899 by John Delehanty, who owned a furniture store that had expanded to occupy the entire building. Except for some minor alterations to the cornice and parapet, the exterior of the building is unaltered from its initial construction.

== See also ==
- William E. Alden House
- National Register of Historic Places listings in Southbridge, Massachusetts
- National Register of Historic Places listings in Worcester County, Massachusetts
