= Yakokut =

Yakokut Якокут
- Selo
- Interactive map of Yakokut
- Location of Yakokut Yakokut (Sakha Republic)
- Coordinates: 58°31′N 125°43′E
- Country: Russia
- Federal subject: Sakha Republic
- Administrative district: Aldansky District
- Urban-type settlementSelsoviet: Leninsky

Population (2010 Census)
  - Total: 111
  - Estimate (2021): 8 (−92.8%)

Municipal status
  - Municipal district: Aldansky Municipal District
  - Urban settlement: Leninsky Urban Settlement
- Time zone: UTC+9 (UTC+09:00)
- Postal code: 678945
- OKTMO ID: 98603161111

Yakokut (Russian: Якокут) is a rural locality (a selo), one of four settlements, in addition to the Urban-type settlements of Leninsky, the administrative centre of the settlement, and Lebediny, and the village of Orochen 1-y in the Leninsky Urban Settlement of Aldansky District in the Sakha Republic, Russia. It is located 45 kilometers (28 mi) from Aldan and 39 kilometers (24 mi) from Leninsky. Its population as of the 2010 Census was 111; down from 150 recorded in the 2002 Census.
