= Alden Rowing =

American manufacturer of rowing boats

- Type: Private
- Industry: Boatbuilding
- Predecessor: Martin Marine Company

Alden Rowing manufactures sliding-seat rowing boats. Their original product, the Alden Ocean Shell, was designed in (sources differ) 1970 or 1971. Traditional shell designs use high aspect ratio hulls, with long waterline with minimum beam, that emphasize racing performance at the cost of stability. These types of boats are only usable on flat water. Alden, however, specializes in shorter, beamier, highly stable designs which are suitable for rowing in open water, where swells are commonly encountered. As of 2004, Alden had sold 25,000 shells.

== History ==
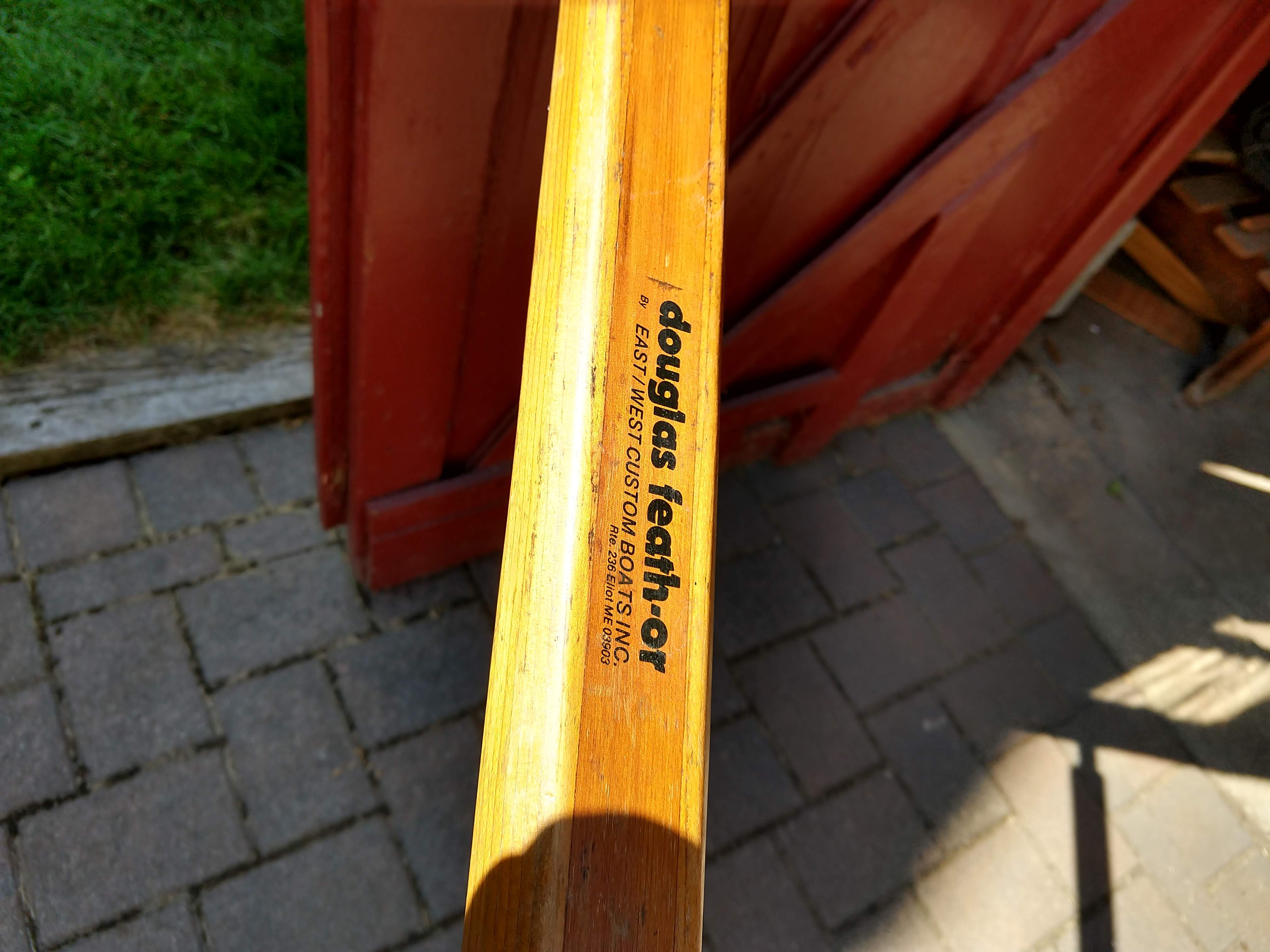
Spruce and mahogany sculling oar. Original equipment from an Alden 18 2x/1x sculling boat.

The original Alden Ocean Shell was designed by Arthur E. Martin, a naval architect, trained at Webb Institute. Martin had begun experimenting with fiberglass as a boatbuilding material in the 1960s. His first design, a 16 ft (4.9 m) kayak, was developed in 1966. Over the next few years, he added a sliding seat and a deck to shed water; this evolved into the Alden Ocean Shell by 1970. Martin Marine was formed in 1971, located in Cohasset, Massachusetts. In 1972, the company moved to Kittery, Maine. Arthur Martin died in 1992, after which the company moved through several ownerships. As of 2006, it was headquartered in Rowley, Massachusetts, under the name Alden Rowing Shells.

In the first year of production, 165 were sold. Martin also developed the drop-in rowing mechanism which came to be called the Oarmaster, which has since evolved over a series of design iterations. This was a metal frame containing the sliding seat, foot stretcher, outriggers, and oarlocks. The frame could be installed in many different boat designs. It isolated all the high stress loadpaths to the metal frame, eliminating point-loads on the boat's hull. The original 16-foot model was sold with spruce and mahogany oars produced by East/West Custom Boats, in Eliot, Maine.

As of 2019, Alden Rowing produces a variety of 1x (single scull) and 2x (double scull) boats, ranging from 16 to 29 feet, all using the drop-in rowing unit concept.

== Race ==
The Alden Ocean Shell Association was originally formed as a membership organization for people who owned Alden boats. The organization sponsors a race from Fort Foster to the Isles of Shoals, crossing 6 mi (9.7 km) of open ocean off the coast of Maine. In 2006, they reorganized into the International Recreational Open Water Association (IROW), and dropped the requirement for members to own Alden boats.

The Mariners' Museum and Park has an Alden 16 in their collection. They describe the boat as having "a flat bottom for stability and a flaring bow for lift and dryness, all very different from the traditional narrow, round-bottomed, straight-sided shell".
