= Ada Municipal Airport =

Airport in Oklahoma, United States

- IATA: ADT; ICAO: KADH; FAA LID: ADH

Summary
- Airport type: Public
- Owner: City of Ada
- Location: Ada, Oklahoma
- Elevation AMSL: 1,016 ft (310 m)
- Coordinates: 34°48′16″N 096°40′17″W
- Interactive map of Ada Municipal Airport

Runways
Direction	Length		Surface
Direction	ft	m	Surface
18/36	6,203	1,891	Asphalt
13/31	2,717	828	Asphalt

Helipads
Number	Length		Surface
Number	ft	m	Surface
H1	40	12	Concrete

Statistics (2020)
- Aircraft operations (year ending 10/1/2020): 12,400
- Based aircraft: 52
- Source: Federal Aviation Administration

Ada Municipal Airport (IATA: ADT, ICAO: KADH, FAA LID: ADH) is two miles north of Ada, in Pontotoc County, Oklahoma. It is owned by the City of Ada, which is 88 miles (142 km) southeast of Oklahoma City.

Most U.S. airports use the same three-letter location identifier for the FAA and IATA, but Ada Municipal Airport is ADH to the FAA and ADT to the IATA (which assigned ADH to Aldan Airport in Aldan, Russia).

Scheduled service at Ada from 1950 to 1963 was first in Beechcraft Bonanzas, then Douglas DC-3's, operated by Central Airlines

== Facilities ==
The airport covers 770 acres (3.1 km^{2}) and has two asphalt runways: 18/36 is 6,203 x 100 ft (30 m) (1,891 x 30 m) and 13/31 is 2,717 x 50 ft (15 m). (828 x 15 m). There is one helipad: H1 measures 40 ft x 40 ft (12m x 12m).

In the year ending October 1, 2020, the airport had 12,400 aircraft operations, average 34 per day: 99% general aviation and <1% military. 52 aircraft were at that time based at the airport: 43 single engine, 5 multi-engine, 2 jet, and 2 helicopter.

== See also ==
- List of airports in Oklahoma
