= Leninsky, Sakha Republic =

Leninsky Ленинский
- Urban-type settlement

Other transcription(s)
  - Yakut: Ленинскай
- Interactive map of Leninsky
- Location of Leninsky Leninsky (Sakha Republic)
- Coordinates: 58°34′N 125°27′E
- Country: Russia
- Federal subject: Sakha Republic
- Administrative district: Aldansky District
- SettlementSelsoviet: Settlement of Leninsky
- Founded: 1926
- Urban-type settlement status since: 1932

Population (2010 Census)
  - Total: 1,866
  - Estimate (January 2016): 1,715 (−8.1%)

Administrative status
  - Capital of: Settlement of Leninsky

Municipal status
  - Municipal district: Aldansky Municipal District
  - Urban settlement: Leninsky Urban Settlement
  - Capital of: Leninsky Urban Settlement
- Time zone: UTC+9 (UTC+09:00)
- Postal code: 678944
- OKTMO ID: 98603161051
- Website: web.archive.org/web/20150927065303/http://leninskij24.ru/

Leninsky population
- 2010 Census: 1,866
- 2002 Census: 2,112
- 1989 Census: 2,662
- 1979 Census: 2,428

Leninsky (Russian: Ле́нинский; Yakut: Ленинскай) is an urban locality (an urban-type settlement) in Aldansky District of the Sakha Republic, Russia, located 6 kilometers (3.7 mi) from Aldan, the administrative center of the district. As of the 2010 Census, its population was 1,866.

== History ==
It was founded in 1926 as a gold-mining base and was known as Nizhne-Stalinsk (Ни́жне-Ста́линск) until 1962. The name referred to Joseph Stalin, with the "Nizhne-" part meaning lower, to differentiate it from the now disappeared settlements of Sredne-Stalinsk and Verkhne-Stalinsk further upstream. Urban-type settlement status was granted to it in 1932.

== Administrative and municipal status ==
Within the framework of administrative divisions, the urban-type settlement of Leninsky is, together with one rural locality (the selo of Yakokut), incorporated within Aldansky District as the Settlement of Leninsky. As a municipal division, the territories of the Settlement of Leninsky and the Settlement of Lebediny are incorporated within Aldansky Municipal District as Leninsky Urban Settlement.

== Economy ==
Gold mining in Leninsky stopped in 1998.

The Amur–Yakutsk Mainline railway passes nearby, as does the A360 Lena Highway to Yakutsk.
