= Ulu, Russia =

Ulu Улу
- Selo
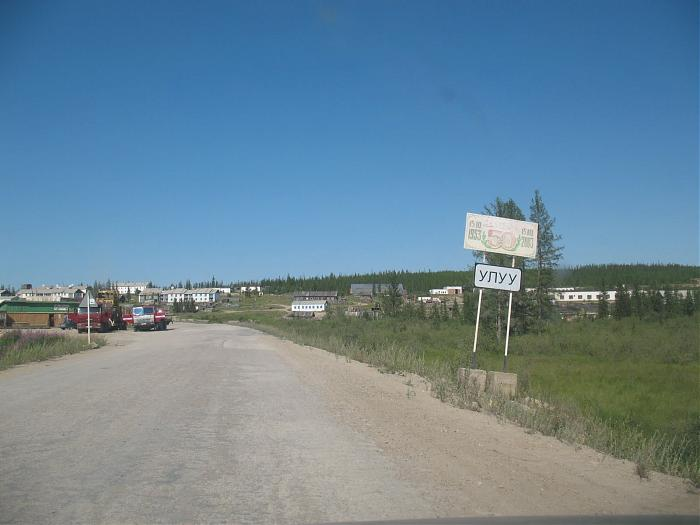
- Entrance to Ulu
- Interactive map of Ulu
- Location of Ulu Ulu (Sakha Republic)
- Coordinates: 60°18′56″N 127°26′04″E
- Country: Russia
- Federal subject: Sakha Republic
- Administrative district: Aldansky District
- TownSelsoviet: Town of Tommot
- Founded: 1953

Population (2010 Census)
  - Total: 139
  - Estimate (2021): 109 (−21.6%)

Municipal status
  - Municipal district: Aldansky Municipal District
  - Urban settlement: Tommot Urban Settlement
- Time zone: UTC+9 (UTC+09:00)
- Postal code: 678957
- OKTMO ID: 98603105116

Ulu (Russian: Улу́; Yakut: Улуу, Uluu) is a rural locality (a selo) under the administrative jurisdiction of the Town of Tommot in Aldansky District of the Sakha Republic, Russia, located on the left bank of the Ulu River, a tributary of the Amga, and 151 kilometers (94 mi) from Tommot. Its population as of the 2010 Census was 139; down from 179 recorded in the 2002 Census.

== Etymology ==
The name derives from a Sakha word meaning "great".

== History ==
It was founded in 1953 as a base for construction of the Lena Highway.

== Infrastructure ==
Besides the highway to the republic capital city of Yakutsk, Ulu has a railway station on the Amur–Yakutsk Mainline, with the railhead having reached Ulu in August 2009.
