= Bolshoy Nimnyr =

Bolshoy Nimnyr Большой Нимныр
- Selo
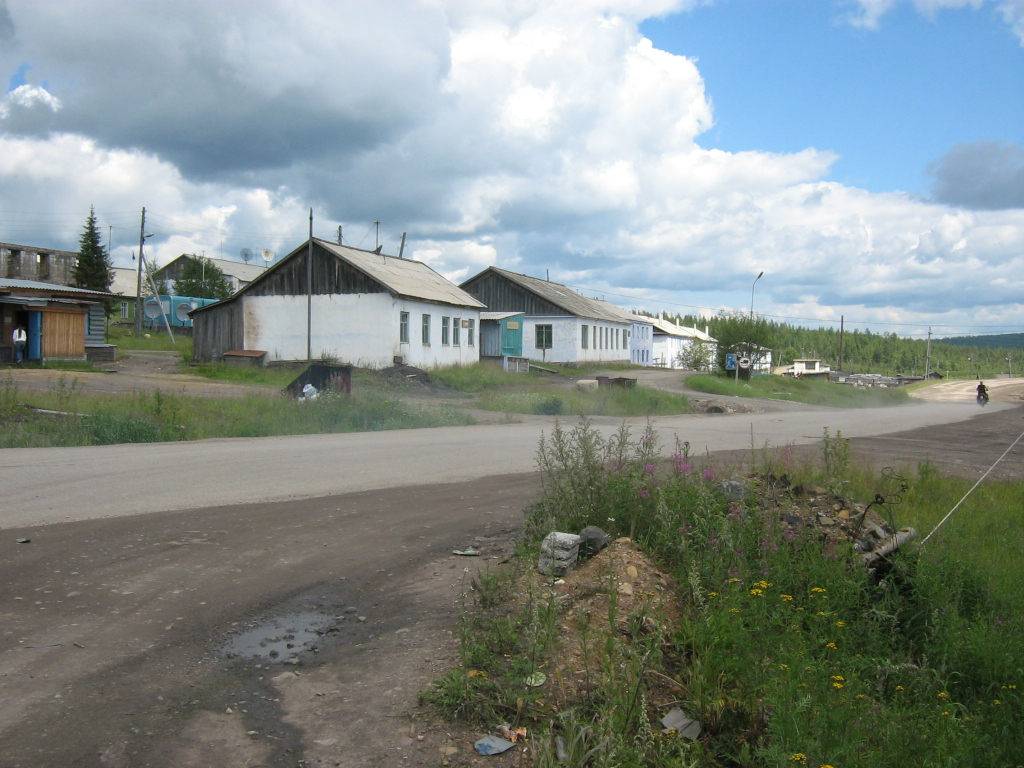
- Street scene, Bolshoy Nimnyr
- Interactive map of Bolshoy Nimnyr
- Location of Bolshoy Nimnyr Bolshoy Nimnyr (Sakha Republic)
- Coordinates: 58°03′N 125°29′E
- Country: Russia
- Federal subject: Sakha Republic
- Administrative district: Aldansky District
- TownSelsoviet: Aldan
- Founded: 1929
- Rural locality status since: June 16, 2005

Population (2010 Census)
  - Total: 236
  - Estimate (2021): 123 (−47.9%)

Municipal status
  - Municipal district: Aldansky Municipal District
  - Urban settlement: Aldan Urban Settlement
- Time zone: UTC+9 (UTC+09:00)
- Postal code: 678942
- OKTMO ID: 98603101111

Bolshoy Nimnyr (Russian: Большой Нимныр; Yakut: Улахан Ньымныыр, Ulaxan Ñımnıır) is a rural locality (a selo) under the administrative jurisdiction of the Town of Aldan in Aldansky District of the Sakha Republic, Russia, located 75 kilometers (47 mi) from Aldan. Its population as of the 2010 Census was 236; down from 479 recorded in the 2002 Census.

== Geography ==
It is located on the north bank of the Bolshoy Nimnyr River, where the river is crossed by the highway to Yakutsk. The Amur–Yakutsk Mainline railway also crosses the river close by; the railway station is located about 2 kilometers (1.2 mi) to the north.

== History ==
It was founded in 1929 as a service point on the road being built toward Yakutsk. It was granted urban-type settlement status in 1973 but was demoted back to a rural locality on June 16, 2005. The now abolished rural locality of Maly Nimnyr (lit. Lesser Nimnyr), abandoned in 1997 due to the high cost of supplies and infrastructure, is located nearby.
