= Lebediny, Sakha Republic =

Lebediny Лебединый
- Urban-type settlement

Other transcription(s)
  - Yakut: Лебединай
- Interactive map of Lebediny
- Location of Lebediny Lebediny (Sakha Republic)
- Coordinates: 58°29′N 125°29′E
- Country: Russia
- Federal subject: Sakha Republic
- Administrative district: Aldansky District
- SettlementSelsoviet: Settlement of Lebediny
- Founded: 1927
- Urban-type settlement status since: 1969

Population (2010 Census)
  - Total: 1,058
  - Estimate (January 2016): 993 (−6.1%)

Municipal status
  - Municipal district: Aldansky Municipal District
  - Urban settlement: Leninsky Urban Settlement
- Time zone: UTC+9 (UTC+09:00)
- Postal code: 678946
- OKTMO ID: 98603161056

Lebediny population
- 2010 Census: 1,058
- 2002 Census: 1,254
- 1989 Census: 2,345
- 1979 Census: 2,308

Lebediny (Russian: Лебеди́ный; Yakut: Лебединай) is an urban locality (an urban-type settlement) in Aldansky District of the Sakha Republic, Russia, located 26 kilometers (16 mi) from Aldan, the administrative center of the district. As of the 2010 Census, its population was 1,058.

== Etymology ==
"Lebediny" is a Russian adjective literally meaning swan-like or of the swan; the name is said to refer to a local legend that swans rested here while migrating south for the winter.

== History ==
It was founded in 1927 in connection to development of local gold deposits, with the Lebediny gold mine beginning operation in 1933. Urban-type settlement status was granted to it in 1967.

== Administrative and municipal status ==
Within the framework of administrative divisions, the urban-type settlement of Lebediny is, together with one rural locality (the selo of Orochen 1-y), incorporated within Aldansky District as the Settlement of Lebediny. As a municipal division, the territories of the Settlement of Lebediny and the Settlement of Leninsky are incorporated within Aldansky Municipal District as Leninsky Urban Settlement.

== Economy ==
Like nearby Yakokut and Leninsky, Lebediny is a gold-mining settlement. The Amur–Yakutsk Mainline railway also passes adjacent to the settlement, which is serviced by Kosarevsky railway station.
