= Yungyuele =

Yungyuele Yakut: Үнгүөлэ
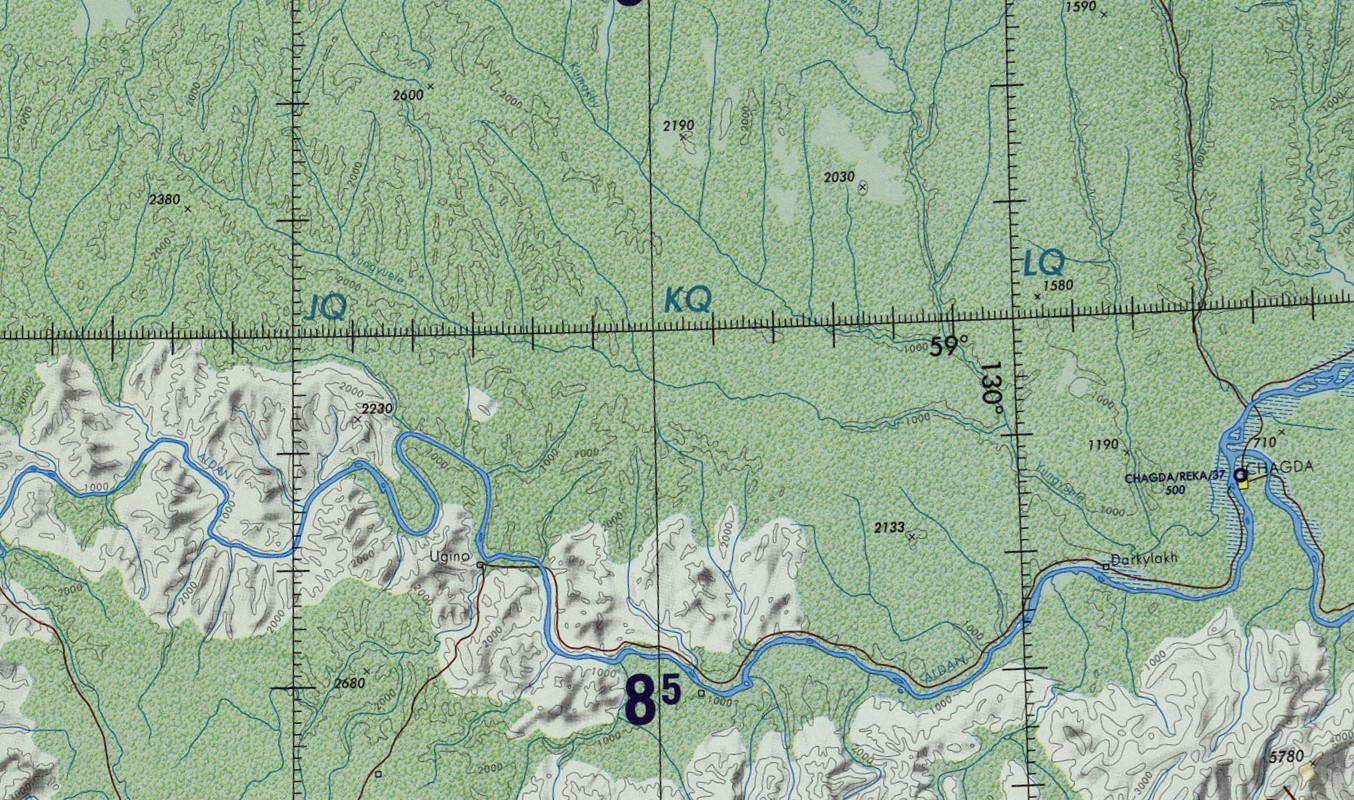
- Course of the Yungyuele ONC map section

- Mouth location in Yakutia, Russia

Location
- Country: Russia

Physical characteristics
- Source
  - location: Aldan Highlands
  - elevation: 800 m (2,600 ft)
- Mouth: Aldan
  - location: Near Chagda
  - coordinates: 58°48′13″N 130°33′42″E
  - elevation: 255 m (837 ft)
- Length: 239 km (149 mi)
- Basin size: 12,200 km^{2} (4,700 sq mi)
- Discharge
  - average: 20 m^{3}/s (710 cu ft/s)

Basin features
- Progression: Aldan→ Lena→ Laptev Sea

The Yungyuele (Russian: Юнгюэле; Yakut: Үнгүөлэ, Üngüöle) is a river in Sakha Republic (Yakutia), Russia. It is a left tributary of the Aldan River of the Lena basin, with a length of 239 kilometres (149 mi) and a drainage basin area of 12,200 square kilometres (4,700 mi^{2}). There are no settlements near its banks.

There are rocks on the banks of the river with petroglyphs depicting deer and human figures which had ritual significance in the culture of the Evenks.

== Course ==
The Yungyuele is the 17th tributary of the Aldan regarding length and basin area. Its source is located on the northern slopes of the Aldan Highlands, at the southern end of Yakutia. The river flows mostly in an ESE direction to the north of the Aldan during all its course. Its valley along the foothills of the Aldan Highlands is deep and narrow, flanked by rocky crags. There is almost no floodplain, except for the final stretch of its course where the Yungyuele makes a wide bend towards the north and joins the right bank of the Aldan 1,211 km (752 mi) from its confluence with the Lena. The village of Chagda is located very close by, in the facing bank of the Aldan.

The largest tributaries are the Eyim-Yurekh (Эйим-Юрэх), the 156 km (97 mi) long Kumakhy (Кумахы), and the Edis (Эдьис), all joining the Yungyuele from the left bank. The river is frozen between October and May.

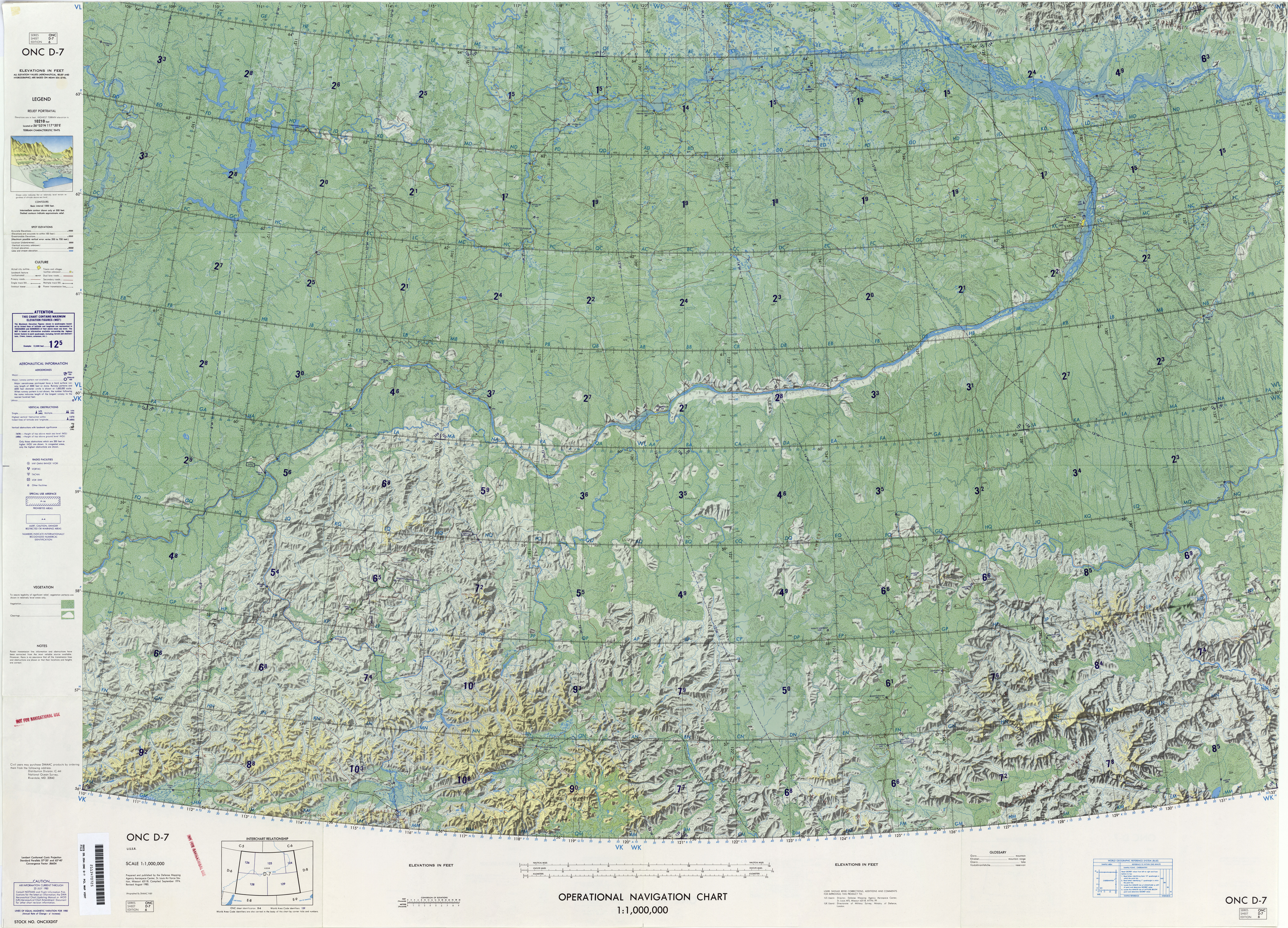
Defense Mapping Agency topographical map showing the Yungyuele in the lower right.

== See also ==
- List of rivers of Russia
