= Lebedinoye, Khasansky District =

Lebedinoye Лебединое
- Selo
- Location of Lebedinoye
- Location of Lebedinoye Lebedinoye (Primorsky Krai)
- Coordinates: 42°34′50″N 130°40′20″E
- Country: Russia
- Federal subject: Primorsky Krai
- Administrative district: Khasansky District
- Founded: 1958

Population (2010 Census)
  - Total: 21
  - Estimate (January 2021): 0

Municipal status
  - Municipal district: Khasansky Municipal District
  - Urban settlement: Khasansky Urban Settlement
- Time zone: UTC+10 (MSK+7)
- Postal code(s): 692715
- OKTMO ID: 05648170106

Lebedinoye (Russian: Лебединое) is inhabited locality (a selo) in Khasansky District, Primorsky Krai in the Russian Far East, close to the border with North Korea. The settlement was established in 1958 close to the Lebedinoye Lake next to the Lebediny train halt (Russian: Разъезд Лебединый which was opened in 1952. The lake is connected to the Ekspeditsii Bay through the Lebediny Bay. The settlement is connected with a 2 km road to the Khasan-Razdolnoye Road A189. In 2016 the settlement was removed from the Russian border zone.
