= Andrey Aldan-Semenov =

Russian writer (1908–1985)

Andrey Aldan-Semyonov
- Born: 27 October 1908; Shungur, Vyatka Governorate, Russian Empire
- Died: 8 December 1985 (aged 77); Moscow, Soviet Union
- Citizenship: Soviet Union
- Occupation: Writer

Andrey Ignatyevich Aldan-Semyonov (Russian: Андре́й Игна́тьевич Алда́н-Семёнов; 27 October 1908 – 8 December 1985) was a Russian writer, who was imprisoned in the Far Eastern Soviet Gulag camps from 1938 to 1953. Along with Boris Dyakov and Yury Pilyar, he published his memoirs of Gulag life as part of the second wave of Russian literature on the Soviet camp experience, after Georgy Shelest published his Kolyma Notes and Alexander Solzhenitsyn his One Day in the Life of Ivan Denisovich.

He died in Moscow on December 8, 1985, and was buried at Kuntsevo Cemetery (Plot 10B). His wife, Olga Antonovna Aldan-Semyonova, was later buried beside him.

== Literature ==
- Казак В. Лексикон русской литературы XX века = Lexikon der russischen Literatur ab 1917. — Москва: РИК Культура, 1996. ISBN 5-8334-0019-8
