= Nizhny Kuranakh =

Nizhny Kuranakh Нижний Куранах
- Urban-type settlement

Other transcription(s)
  - Yakut: Аллараа Кураанах
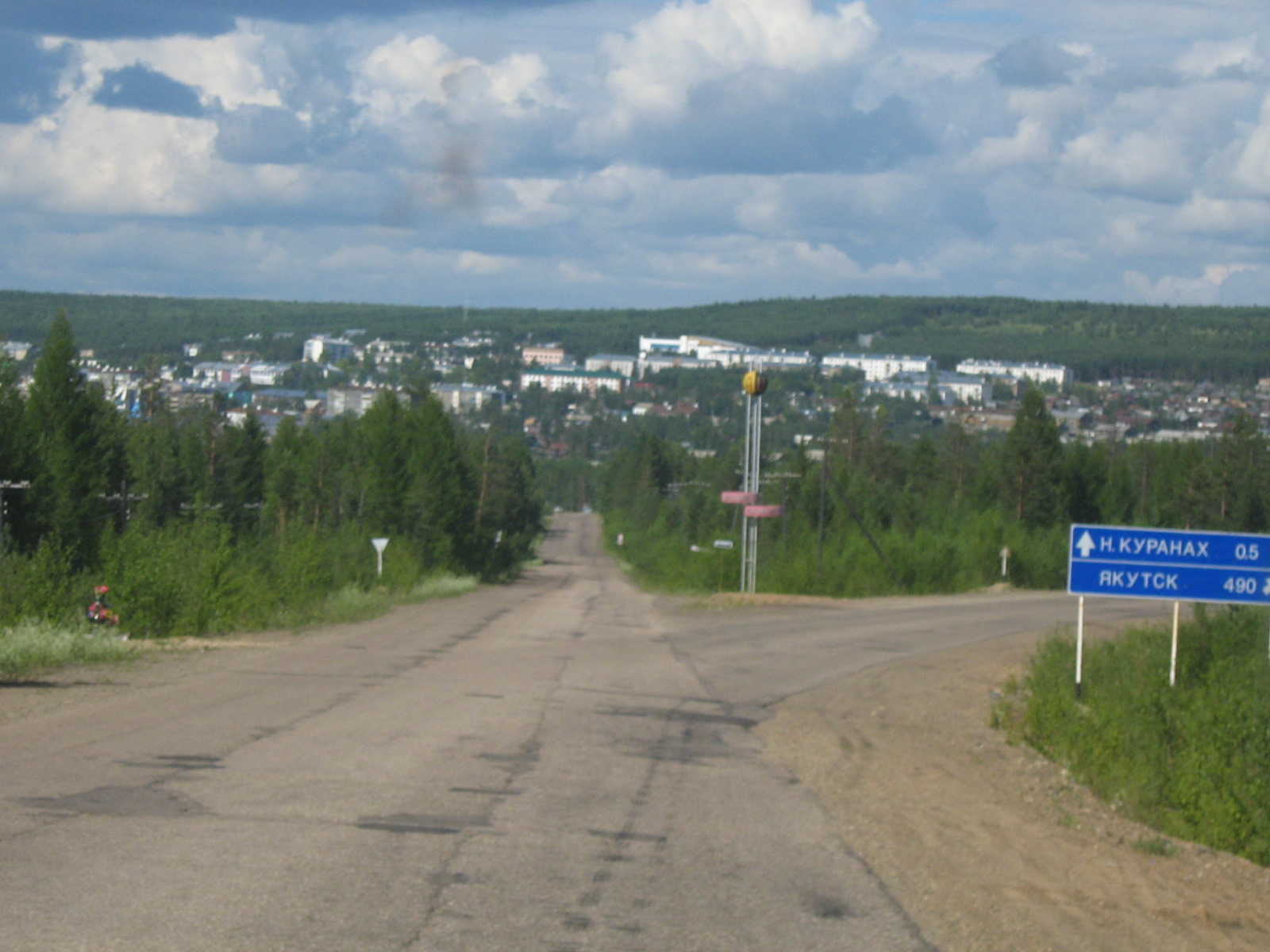
- View of Nizhny Kuranakh from the main road
- Interactive map of Nizhny Kuranakh
- Location of Nizhny Kuranakh Nizhny Kuranakh (Sakha Republic)
- Coordinates: 58°49′N 125°31′E
- Country: Russia
- Federal subject: Sakha Republic
- Administrative district: Aldansky District
- SettlementSelsoviet: Settlement of Nizhny Kuranakh
- Founded: 1920s
- Urban-type settlement status since: 1950
- Elevation: 430 m (1,410 ft)

Population (2010 Census)
  - Total: 5,901
  - Estimate (January 2016): 5,459 (−7.5%)

Administrative status
  - Capital of: Settlement of Nizhny Kuranakh

Municipal status
  - Municipal district: Aldansky Municipal District
  - Urban settlement: Nizhny Kuranakh Urban Settlement
  - Capital of: Nizhny Kuranakh Urban Settlement
- Time zone: UTC+9 (UTC+09:00)
- Postal code: 678940
- OKTMO ID: 98603170051

Nizhny Kuranakh population
- 2010 Census: 5,901
- 2002 Census: 7,027
- 1989 Census: 8,190
- 1979 Census: 6,274

Nizhny Kuranakh (Russian: Ни́жний Курана́х; Yakut: Аллараа Кураанах, Allaraa Kuraanax) is an urban locality (an urban-type settlement) in Aldansky District of the Sakha Republic, Russia, located 30 kilometers (19 mi) from Aldan, the administrative center of the district. As of the 2010 Census, its population was 5,901.

== History ==
It was first settled in the 1920s, when gold was discovered and mining activities began. It was granted urban-type settlement status in 1950.

== Administrative and municipal status ==
Within the framework of administrative divisions, the urban-type settlement of Nizhny Kuranakh, together with two rural localities, is incorporated within Aldansky District as the Settlement of Nizhny Kuranakh. As a municipal division, the Settlement of Nizhny Kuranakh is incorporated within Aldansky Municipal District as Nizhny Kuranakh Urban Settlement.

== Economy ==
Nizhny Kuranakh is located on the Amur–Yakutsk Mainline, between the towns of Aldan and Tommot. Employment is centered mainly on the nearby open-cut gold mine. Mining company Aldanzoloto maintains its head offices in Nizhny Kuranakh and employs about 80% of its workforce.
