= Juleyka Lantigua =

American journalist and entrepreneur

- Born: Dominican Republic
- Education: Skidmore College
- Occupation(s): Journalist and entrepreneur
- Known for: Founder of podcast production company Lantigua Williams & Co.

Juleyka Lantigua (formerly known as Juleyka Lantigua-Williams) is an American journalist and entrepreneur. She is the founder and CEO of the podcast production company Lantigua Williams & Co., which rebranded in 2021 to LWC Studios as part of a reorganization and expansion. She has won a number of awards for her work, including a Peabody Award nomination in 2020.

== Biography ==
Lantigua was born in the Dominican Republic and moved to the United States with her family when she was ten. They lived in the Bronx. She then attended Skidmore College and was awarded a Fulbright scholarship during her senior year of college, and graduated in 1996.

Her first job in the journalism industry was at the magazine Urban Latino, as an editor, and she later worked as a syndicated columnist for the Progressive Media Project. She was hired by NPR in December 2016, and announced her resignation at the end of May 2017. She was the senior producer of Code Switch at NPR, and covered criminal justice for The Atlantic. After founding the Lantigua Williams & Co. production company, she began producing the Latina to Latina podcast with Alicia Menendez.

She was an associate producer on Sol de agosto ("August Sun"), a short film that was shortlisted for the BAFTA Student Awards and was an official selection at the 2018 Palm Springs International ShortFest. She was also a producer on the pilot of Barry & Joe: The Animated Series, an adult time-travel adventure in which President Barack Obama and Vice President Joe Biden travel back in time to save the world.

== Honors and awards ==
The Lantigua Williams & Co.-produced podcast "70 Million", about the effects of local jails on people and communities, was nominated for a 2020 Peabody Award and won a 2020 New York Festivals Radio Award for Best Narrative/Documentary Podcast.

Lantigua-Williams was a 2020 Tory Burch Foundation fellow.

A podcast series produced by Lantigua Williams & Co., "Driving the Green Book", won a 2021 Ambie Award for Best History Podcast. Hosted by BBC broadcaster Alvin Hall and activist Janée Woods Weber, the podcast features personal stories about how Black Americans, during the segregation era in the United States, used The Negro Motorist Green Book as a guide to traveling safely and with dignity.

== Works ==
- Lantigua-Williams, Juleyka; Medrano, Marianela, eds. (September 2013). Confluencia in the Valley: The First Five Years of Converging with Words. Naugatuck Valley Community College. ISBN 9780615833637.
