= Bezymyanny, Sakha Republic =

Bezymyanny Безымянный
- Urban-type settlement

Other transcription(s)
  - Yakut: Безымяннай
- Interactive map of Bezymyanny
- Location of Bezymyanny Bezymyanny (Sakha Republic)
- Coordinates: 58°44′N 126°23′E
- Country: Russia
- Federal subject: Sakha Republic
- Administrative district: Aldansky District
- SettlementSelsoviet: Settlement of Bezymyanny
- Urban-type settlement status since: 1981
- Elevation: 622 m (2,041 ft)

Population (2010 Census)
  - Total: 0
  - Estimate (January 2016): 0 )

Administrative status
  - Capital of: Settlement of Bezymyanny

Municipal status
  - Municipal district: Aldansky Municipal District
  - Urban settlement: Tommot Urban Settlement
- Time zone: UTC+9 (UTC+09:00)
- Postal code: 678926
- OKTMO ID: 98603105056

Bezymyanny population
- 2010 Census: 0
- 2002 Census: 111
- 1989 Census: 537

Bezymyanny (Russian: Безымя́нный, lit. nameless; Yakut: Безымяннай) is an urban locality (an urban-type settlement) in Aldansky District of the Sakha Republic, Russia, located 112 kilometers (70 mi) from Aldan, the administrative center of the district. As of the 2010 Census, it had no recorded population.

== History ==
Urban-type settlement status was granted to it in 1981.

== Administrative and municipal status ==
Within the framework of administrative divisions, the urban-type settlement of Bezymyanny is incorporated within Aldansky District as the Settlement of Bezymyanny. As a municipal division, the territories of the Settlement of Bezymyanny and the Town of Tommot are incorporated within Aldansky Municipal District as Tommot Urban Settlement.
