= Load path analysis =

Technique of mechanical and structural engineering

Load path analysis is a technique of mechanical and structural engineering used to determine the path of maximum stress in a non-uniform load-bearing member in response to an applied load. Load path analysis can be used to minimize the material needed in the load-bearing member to support the design load.

Load path analysis may be performed using the concept of a load transfer index, U*. In a structure, the main portion of the load is transferred through the stiffest route. The U* index represents the internal stiffness of every point within the structure. Consequently, the line connecting the highest U* values is the main load path. In other words, the main load path is the ridge line of the U* distribution (contour) This method of analysis has been verified in physical experimentation.

== Load path calculation using U* index ==
In a structure, the main portion of the load is transferred through the stiffest route. The U* index represents the internal stiffness of every point within the structure. Consequently, the line connecting the highest U* values is the main load path. In other words, the main load path is the ridge line of the U* distribution (contour). The U* index theory has been validated through two different physical experiments.

Since the U* index predicts the load paths based on the structural stiffness, it is not affected by the stress concentration problems. The load transfer analysis using the U* index is a new design paradigm for vehicle structural design. It has been applied in design analysis and optimization by automotive manufacturers like Honda and Nissan.

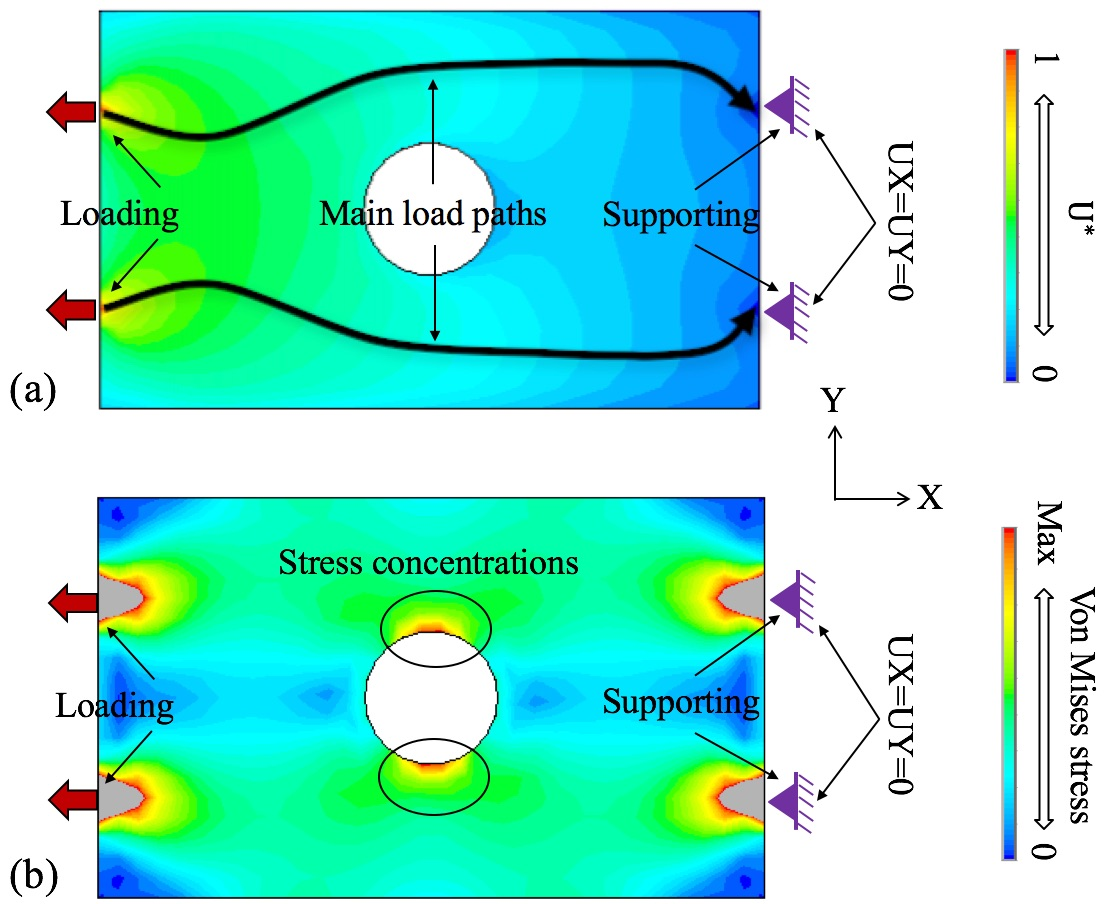
a): load paths based on U* index; b): von Mises stress distribution

In the image to the right, a structural member with a central hole is placed under load bearing stress. Figure (a) shows the U* distribution and the resultant load paths while figure (b) is the von Mises Stress distribution. As can be seen from figure (b), higher stresses can be observed at the vicinity of the hole. However, it is unreasonable to conclude the main load passes that area with stress concentration because the hole (which has no material) is not important for carrying the load. The stress concentration caused by the structural singularities like a hole or a notch makes the load transfer analysis more difficult.
