= William E. Alden House =

Historic house in Massachusetts, United States

- U.S. National Register of Historic Places
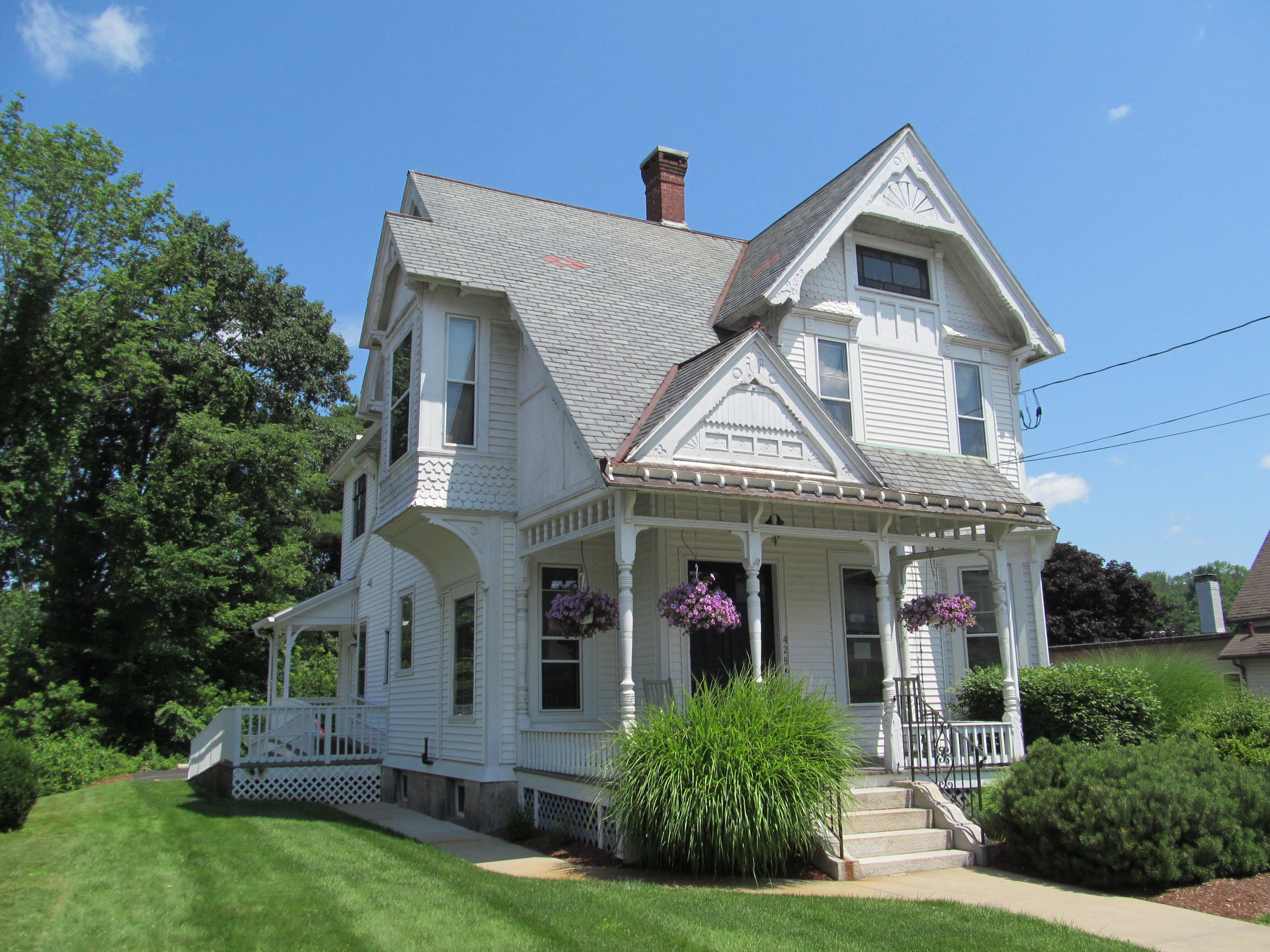
- William E. Alden House

- Location within Massachusetts Location within the United States
- Location: 428 Hamilton St., Southbridge, Massachusetts
- Coordinates: 42°4′55″N 72°2′28″W
- Built: 1882
- Architectural style: Queen Anne, Shingle Style
- MPS: Southbridge MRA
- NRHP reference No.: 89000562
- Added to NRHP: June 22, 1989

The William E. Alden House is a historic house at 428 Hamilton Street in Southbridge, Massachusetts. Built in 1882 for a prominent local businessman, it is a fine example of a modest home with Queen Anne and Stick style decoration. It was listed on the National Register of Historic Places in 1989.

== Description and history ==
The William E. Alden House is located north east of Southbridge's Globe Village, on the north side of Hamilton Street between its junctions with Hill and Oliver Streets. It is a 2 1/2 story wood-frame structure, with a complex gabled roof and mostly clapboarded exterior. It has a fairly typical Queen Anne Victorian asymmetrical arrangement of projections, and a porch with turned posts and a spindled valance that extends across part of the front and left sides. Some of the gables have been clad in decorative shingles, and have Stick style woodwork adorning them. At the rear of the property is a period carriage house, finished in board and batten siding. It is topped by a gable roof with cupola, and has a decorative balcony on its main facade.

The house was built in 1882 for William E. Alden, Jr., who ran a dry goods business and grocery in the Alden Block, which he and his father had built. At the time of its construction, the house was the only building on that stretch of Hamilton Street, with the exception of the church next door and another smaller house. Although it is not the most elaborate of Southbridge's period houses, it is a well-preserved example of a more modest home of the time.

== See also ==
- National Register of Historic Places listings in Southbridge, Massachusetts
- National Register of Historic Places listings in Worcester County, Massachusetts
