= Arthur Alden House =

Historic house in Massachusetts, United States

- U.S. National Register of Historic Places
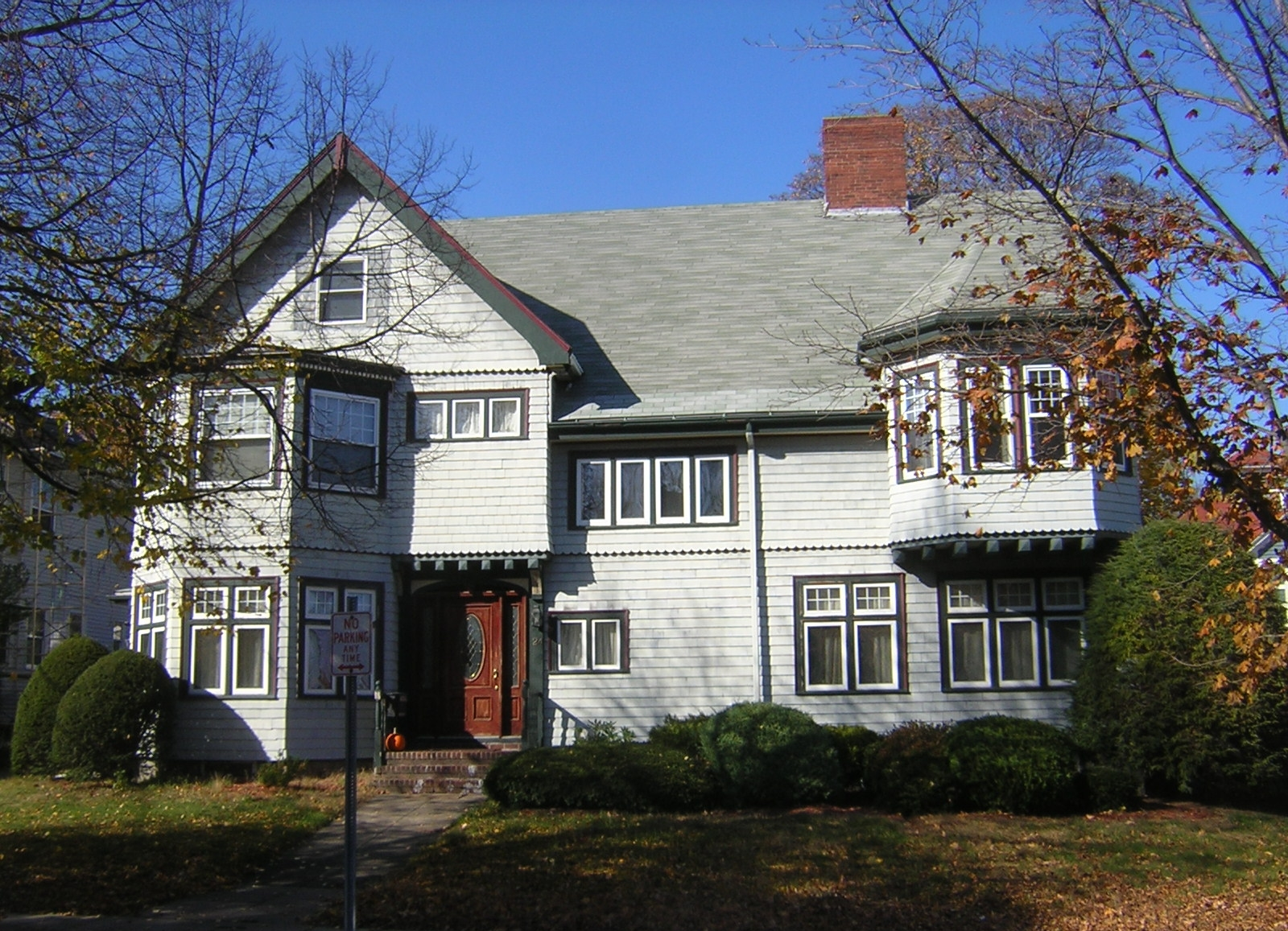

- Location within Massachusetts Location within the United States
- Location: 24 Whitney Rd., Quincy, Massachusetts
- Coordinates: 42°15′15.7″N 71°0′15.6″W
- Area: 0.2 acres (0.081 ha)
- Built: 1909
- Architect: William R. Lofgren
- Architectural style: Queen Anne, Shingle Style
- MPS: Quincy MRA
- NRHP reference No.: 89001382
- Added to NRHP: September 20, 1989

The Arthur Alden House is a historic house at 24 Whitney Road in Quincy, Massachusetts. Built in 1909, it is a good example of a Queen Anne architecture with Shingle style details. It was listed on the National Register of Historic Places in 1989.

== Description and history ==
The Arthur Alden House is located near Quincy's main business district, on the north side of Whitney Road a short way east of Hancock Street. It is a 2 1/2-story wood-frame structure that is basically rectangular in shape with a side-gable roof. It has an asymmetrical facade, with a polygonal bay at the right corner, topped by a hip roof, and a slightly projecting gabled section on the left side. A two-story polygonal bay projects further from this gabled section. The main entrance is just to its right, recessed under the gable section. The recess has decorative wooden elements, including heavy brackets. The building walls are finished in a combination of regular and decorative cut wooden shingles. Windows are of differing sizes and shapes, including sash windows with multipane tops and single-pane bottoms, and casement-style single windows topped by multipane fixed transoms.

This house was designed by architect William Lofgren and built in 1909 for Arthur Alden, an executive in financial services companies based in Quincy. The building is a well-executed and preserved example of Queen Anne styling, with its asymmetrical facade, variety of protruding elements, and varied window types. It is the most architecturally sophisticated house on Whitney Road, which was developed residentially in the early 20th century for middle-to-upper class residents, most of whom worked in Quincy.

== See also ==
- National Register of Historic Places listings in Quincy, Massachusetts
