= Aldan mine =

Iron mine in Russia

Coordinates: 58.7280°N 124.9431°E

- Interactive map of Aldan mine
- Location: Sakha Republic, Russia
- Products: Iron ore

The Aldan mine is a large iron mine located in eastern Russia in the Sakha Republic. Aldan represents one of the largest iron ore reserves in Russia and in the world, having estimated reserves of 2 billion tonnes of ore grading 47% iron metal.
