= Tommot Urban Settlement =

Municipal formation in Sakha, Russia

Coordinates: 58.94802°N 126.27737°E

Tommot Urban Settlement (Russian: городско́е поселе́ние «го́род Томмо́т») is a municipal formation (an urban settlement) in Aldansky Municipal District of the Sakha Republic, Russia, one of the four urban settlements in the district. Its territory comprises the territories of two administrative divisions of Aldansky District—the Town of Tommot (which, in addition to Tommot, contains three rural localities) and the Settlement of Bezymyanny.
