= Edward Alden =

American foreign policy analyst

- Born: April 1961 (age 64–65)
- Education: University of California, Berkeley; University of British Columbia
- Occupations: Author, Journalist

Edward Alden (born 1961) is an American journalist, author, and the Bernard L. Schwartz senior fellow at the Council on Foreign Relations. Alden specializes in U.S. economic competitiveness, U.S. trade policy, and visa and immigration policy. Alden is the author of The Closing of the American Border: Terrorism, Immigration, and Security Since 9/11, a finalist for the Lukas Book Prize, and Failure to Adjust: How Americans Got Left Behind in the Global Economy.

== Biography ==
Edward Alden was born in Schenectady, New York, and raised in Vancouver, British Columbia, Canada. He graduated from The University of British Columbia, and got his M.A. in International Relations and Foreign Affairs from the University of California, Berkeley.

Previously, Alden was the Washington bureau chief for the Financial Times, a reporter for the Vancouver Sun and the managing editor for Inside U.S. Trade. He has been published by The New York Times, The Washington Post, The Wall Street Journal, Los Angeles Times, Foreign Policy, Foreign Affairs, Fortune, and The Globe and Mail, and appeared on PBS NewsHour, NPR, BBC, CNN, Fox News and MSNBC. In 2011, his article published in Newsweek, titled "The Story of One Man's Immigration Ordeal," garnered national attention.

== Books ==
Alden's first book, The Closing of the American Border: Terrorism, Immigration, and Security since 9/11 (2008) was a finalist for the Lukas Book Prize." The judges wrote, "Exceptional journalism is required to take immigration — a neglected sideshow in the nation's globe-girding response to the September 11 attacks — and make the topic as evocative of America's misplaced values as the Iraq War and the tolerance for torture." Alden returned the next year, in 2010, as a judge for the prize. Alden's other books include U.S. Immigration Policy (2009), written with Jeb Bush and Thomas F. McLarty; U.S Trade and Investment Policy (2011), written with Andrew Card, Matthew J. Slaughter, and Thomas Daschle; and How America Stacks Up: Economic Competitiveness and U.S. Policy (2016) with Rebecca Strauss.

Failure to Adjust: How Americans Got Left Behind in the Global Economy was published on October 20, 2016. The book provides a "constructive analysis of the origins of opposition to economic openness that charts a viable path forward."

== Personal life ==
Alden is currently the Ross Distinguished Professor in Business and Economics at Western Washington University in Bellingham, Washington.
