= Charles E. Alden =

American inventor

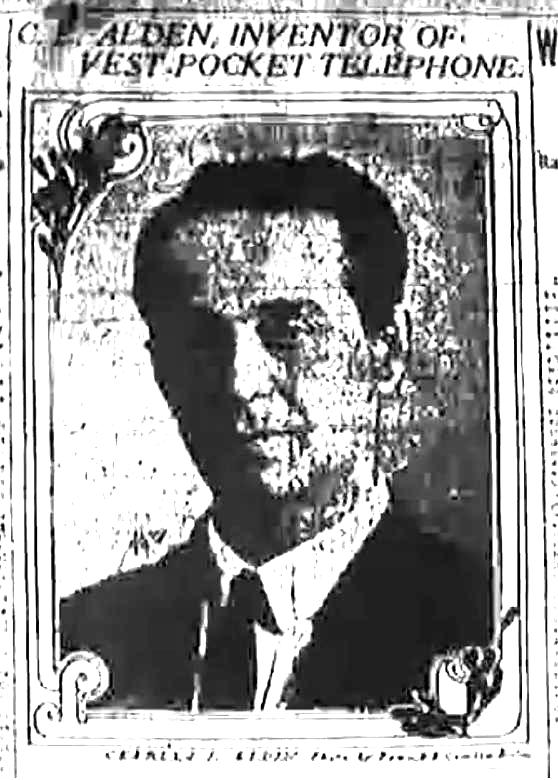
- A picture of Alden in the April 29, 1906 issue of the New York World
- Born: Charles Edward Alden; September 14, 1964; Charlestown, Massachusetts, U.S.
- Died: June 30, 1923 (aged 58)
- Education: Fairhaven High School
- Occupations: Inventor, sculptor
- Known for: The invention of the "vest pocket telephone" in 1906

Charles Edward Alden (September 14, 1864 – June 30, 1923) was an American inventor mentioned in a 1906 edition of the New York World who was claimed to have created the idea of a vest pocket telephone, a device that was the precursor of the cell phone. An article titled “Ingenious Yankee Invents Simple Telephone System” appeared in the May 24, 1907 edition of L’Abeille de la Nouvelle-Orléans, a New Orleans newspaper. He envisioned the idea in 1906, 67 years before the first hand-held mobile phone was demonstrated by Dr. Martin Cooper of Motorola in 1973.

== Early life and career ==
Born in Charlestown, Massachusetts on September 14, 1864, Alden was the son of Maria (née Lewis) and John Alden. He attended Fairhaven High School, graduating in 1877. Some years later, he moved to New York and studied with sculptor Louis Saint-Gaudens. Later still, he was hired by that sculptor's better-known brother Augustus, whom he would assist on some of the latter's most famous works, including the Admiral Farragut Monument and the Robert Gould Shaw Memorial on Boston Common.

In 1907, Alden invented and tested a wireless remote-controlled boat off the coast of Martha's Vineyard. This boat was said to have “lifted its own anchor, blows its own whistle, signals, fires a gun and steers” all while the operator is controlling it on shore.

COTTAGE CITY, Mass. April 28 [1906]. "Charles E. Alden of New York has been pursuing experiments here since last fall in wireless telephoning. Has, he says, solved the problem of wireless telephoning and the result is so simple that is likely to create a sensation in the business world as well as in scientific circles."

— New York World, April 29, 1906

== Death ==
Alden died on June 30, 1923, aged 58, in Boston's Dorchester neighborhood. A service was conducted three days later for family and friends at Waterman's Chapel, located in Kenmore Square.
