= Aldan Airport =

Airport in Sakha, Russia

Aldan Airport Аэропорт Алдан
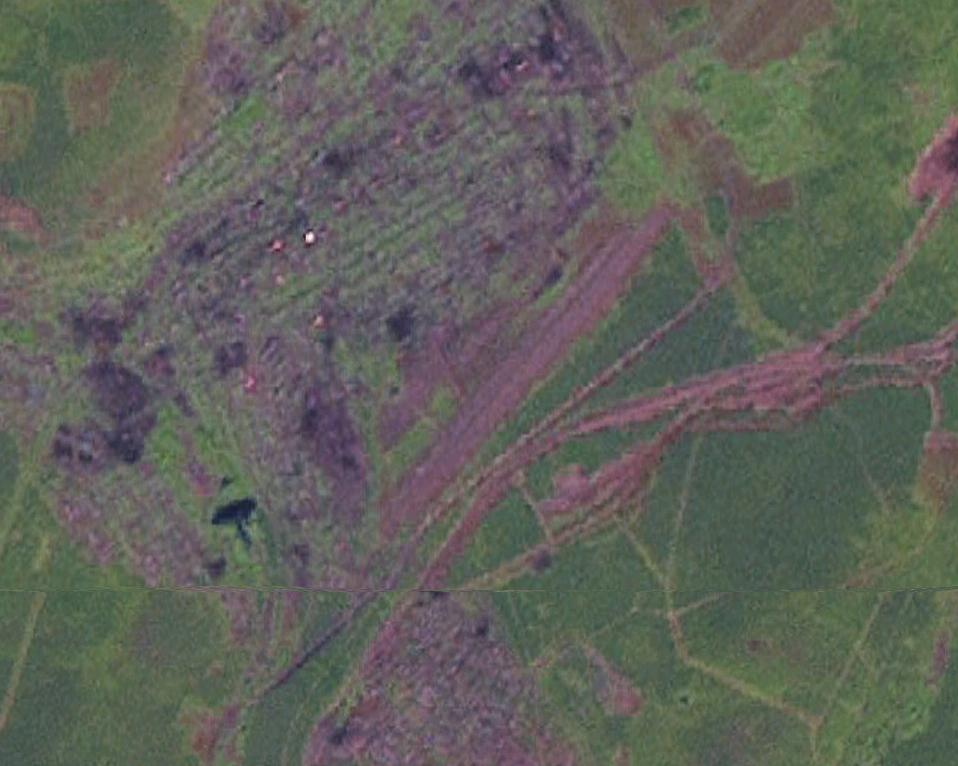
- IATA: ADH; ICAO: UEEA; LID: АЛД

Summary
- Airport type: public
- Operator: Aeroport Aldan (subsidiary of)
- Serves: Aldan, Aldansky District, Sakha Republic, Russia
- Elevation AMSL: 683 m / 2,241 ft
- Coordinates: 58°36′11″N 125°24′26″E

Maps
- Sakha Republic in Russia

- Location of the airport in the Sakha Republic

Runways
Direction	Length		Surface
Direction	m	ft	Surface
06/24	1,376	4,514	Asphalt
- Sources: Airport Guide, GCM, STV

Aldan Airport (IATA: ADH, ICAO: UEEA) is a civilian airport in Russia located 1 kilometre (0.62 mi) east of Aldan, Aldansky District in the Sakha Republic of Russia. It is 450 kilometres (280 mi) away from Yakutsk.

== See also ==
- List of airports in Russia
