= Raymond W. Alden III =

American academic administrator

Provost Alden

Provost of Touro University Nevada
- Incumbent
- Assumed office 2015

Personal details
- Education: University of Florida; Stetson University
- Profession: Educator

Raymond W. Alden III is the current Provost of Touro University Nevada.

Alden attended the Stetson University for his bachelor's degree in biology, and he received his Doctorate in Zoology from the University of Florida. He began his academic career on the faculty at Old Dominion University, spending 21 years there. Later Alden went to the University of Nevada Las Vegas, and served for 10 years as the Provost. In January 2006, Alden accepted the position as Provost at Northern Illinois University. In April 2015, Alden left NIU and joined Touro University Nevada as Provost.
