= Tommot =

Tommot Томмот
- Town under district jurisdiction

Other transcription(s)
  - Yakut: Томмот
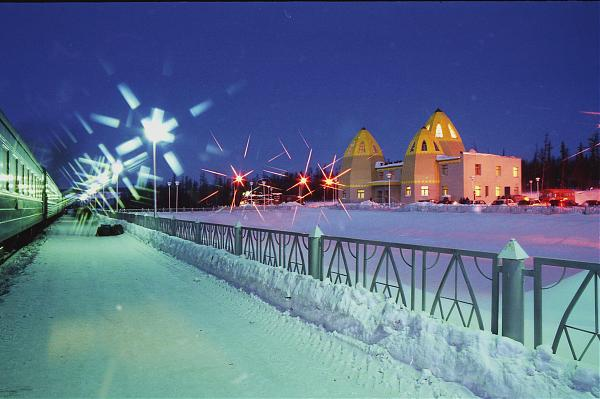
- Tommot railway station in winter

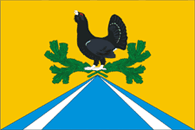
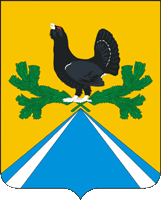
- Flag Coat of arms
- Interactive map of Tommot
- Location of Tommot Tommot (Sakha Republic)
- Coordinates: 58°58′N 126°18′E
- Country: Russia
- Federal subject: Sakha Republic
- Administrative district: Aldansky District
- TownSelsoviet: Tommot
- Founded: 1923
- Town status since: 1925
- Elevation: 290 m (950 ft)

Population (2010 Census)
  - Total: 8,057
  - Estimate (January 2016): 7,194 (−10.7%)

Administrative status
  - Capital of: Town of Tommot

Municipal status
  - Municipal district: Aldansky Municipal District
  - Urban settlement: Tommot Urban Settlement
  - Capital of: Tommot Urban Settlement
- Time zone: UTC+9 (UTC+09:00)
- Postal code: 678953–678956
- Dialing code: +7 41145
- OKTMO ID: 98603105001
- Website: tommot.org

Tommot population
- 2010 Census: 8,057
- 2002 Census: 9,032
- 1989 Census: 9,460
- 1979 Census: 6,320

Tommot (Russian: Томмо́т; Yakut: Томмот) is a town in Aldansky District of the Sakha Republic, Russia, located on the Aldan River (a right-hand tributary of the Lena) 390 kilometers (240 mi) southwest of Yakutsk, the capital of the republic, and 70 kilometers (43 mi) northeast of Aldan, the administrative center of the district. As of the 2010 Census, its population was 8,057.

== Etymology ==
The name of the town is derived from a Yakut word meaning non-freezing.

== Geography ==
Tommot is located in the Aldan Highlands. The town was the terminus of the passenger trains of the Amur–Yakutsk Mainline. In November 2011, the railway was extended to Nizhny Bestyakh; it will eventually reach Yakutsk. Both the railway and the Lena Highway cross the Aldan at this point.

== History ==
It was founded in 1923 with the construction of a river port on the Aldan for supplies to the Nezametny gold mine in the present-day town of Aldan. It was formerly the head of navigation of the Aldan River. Tommot was granted town status in 1925.

== Administrative and municipal status ==
As an inhabited locality, Tommot is classified as a town under district jurisdiction. Within the framework of administrative divisions, it is, together with three rural localities, incorporated within Aldansky District as the Town of Tommot. As a municipal division, the territories of the Town of Tommot and the Settlement of Bezymyanny are incorporated within Aldansky Municipal District as Tommot Urban Settlement.

== Economy ==
Mining of mica deposits began in 1942, after they were discovered in a stream near the town by a hunter.
