= Aldansky District =

Aldansky District Алданский улус (Russian)
- District

Other transcription(s)
  - Yakut: Алдан улууһа
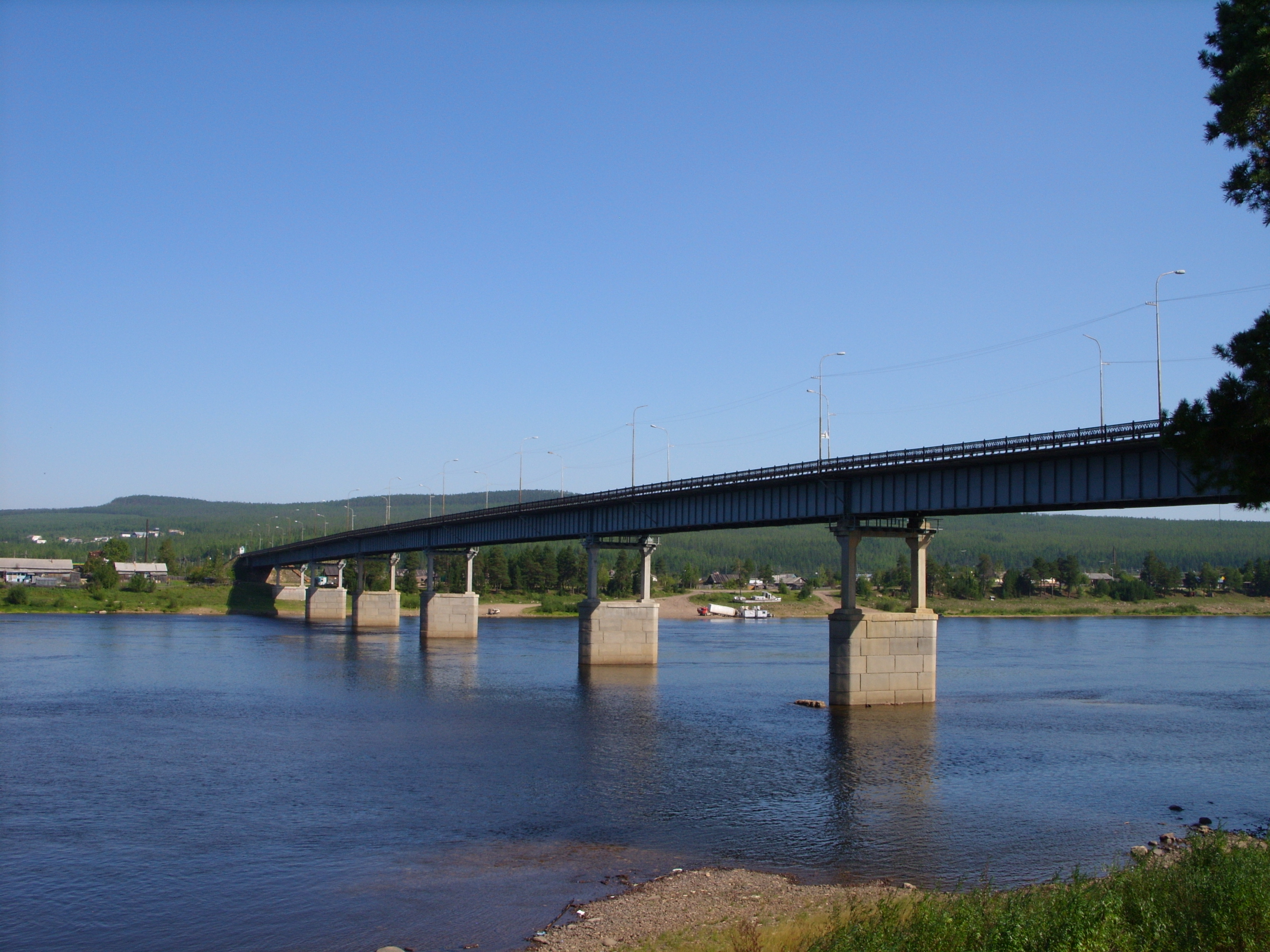
- A bridge across the Aldan River in Tommot, Aldansky District

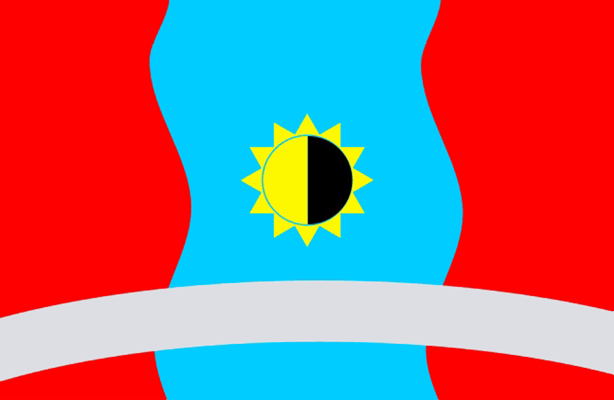
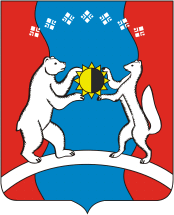
- Flag Coat of arms
- Location of Aldansky District in the Sakha Republic
- Coordinates: 58°40′N 125°21′E
- Country: Russia
- Federal subject: Sakha Republic
- Established: May 5, 1930
- Administrative center: Aldan

Area
  - Total: 156,800 km^{2} (60,500 sq mi)

Population (2010 Census)
  - Total: 42,632
  - Estimate (January 2016): 40,431
  - Density: 0.2719/km^{2} (0.7042/sq mi)
  - Urban: 89.5%
  - Rural: 10.5%

Administrative structure
  - Administrative divisions: 2 Towns under district jurisdiction, 4 Settlements, 3 Rural okrugs
  - Inhabited localities: 2 cities/towns, 4 urban-type settlements, 13 rural localities

Municipal structure
  - Municipally incorporated as: Aldansky Municipal District
  - Municipal divisions: 4 urban settlements, 3 rural settlements
- Time zone: UTC+
- OKTMO ID: 98603000
- Website: aldray.ru

Population of Aldansky District
- 2010 Census: 42,632
- 2002 Census: 49,346
- 1989 Census: 63,812
- 1979 Census: 53,207

Aldansky District (Russian: Алда́нский улу́с; Yakut: Алдан улууһа, Aldan uluuha, [aldan uluːha]) is an administrative and municipal district (raion, or ulus), one of the thirty-three in the Sakha Republic, Russia.

== Location ==
It is located in the south of the republic on the right bank of the Lena River near the mouth of the Aldan River and borders with Khangalassky and Amginsky Districts in the north, Ust-Maysky District in the northeast, Khabarovsk Krai in the east, Neryungrinsky District in the south, and with Olyokminsky District in the west and southwest.

== Geography ==
The area of the district is 156,800 square kilometers (60,500 sq mi). Its area is larger than the country of Bangladesh. Its administrative center is the town of Aldan.

== Population ==
As of the 2010 Census, the total population of the district was 42,632, with the population of Aldan accounting for 49.9% of that number.

== Geography ==
The landscape of the district is mostly mountainous, dominated mainly by the Aldan Highlands. The northern end of the district is in the Lena Plateau.

=== Climate ===
Average January temperature ranges from −36 °C (−33 °F) to −30 °C (−22 °F) and average July temperature ranges from +10 °C (50 °F) to +18 °C (64 °F). Average precipitation varies from 300 millimeters (12 in) in the north to 600 millimeters (24 in) in the south.

== History ==
The district was established on May 5, 1930.

== Administrative and municipal status ==
Within the framework of administrative divisions, Aldansky District is one of the thirty-four in the republic. It is divided into two towns (administrative divisions with the administrative centers in the towns (inhabited localities) of Aldan and Tommot), four settlements (administrative divisions with the administrative centers in the urban-type settlements (inhabited localities) of Bezymyanny, Lebediny, Leninsky, and Nizhny Kuranakh), and three rural okrugs (naslegs), all of which comprise thirteen rural localities. As a municipal division, the district is incorporated as Aldansky Municipal District. Within the municipal district, the Town of Aldan is incorporated into Aldan Urban Settlement, the Town of Tommot and the Settlement of Bezymyanny are incorporated into Tommot Urban Settlement, the Settlements of Lebediny and Leninsky are incorporated into Leninsky Urban Settlement, the Settlement of Nizhny Kuranakh is incorporated into Nizhny Kuranakh Urban Settlement, and the three rural okrugs are incorporated into three rural settlements. The town of Aldan serves as the administrative center of both the administrative and municipal district.

=== Inhabited localities ===
Administrative/municipal composition
Towns/Urban settlements	Population	Inhabited localities in municipal jurisdiction
Aldan (Алдан)	21,529	**town of Aldan** (administrative center of the district); selo of Orochen 2-y; selo of Bolshoy Nimnyr
Tommot (Томмот)	8,695	**town of Tommot**; urban-type settlement of Bezymyanny (administratively, a part of the Settlement of Bezymyanny); selo of Verkhnyaya Amga; selo of Ulu; selo of Yllymakh
Settlements/Urban settlements	Population	Inhabited localities in municipal jurisdiction
Leninsky (Ленинский)	3,051	**urban-type settlement of Leninsky**; urban-type settlement of Lebediny (administratively, a part of the Settlement of Lebediny); selo of Orochen 1-y (administratively, a part of the Settlement of Lebediny); selo of Yakokut
Nizhny Kuranakh (Нижний Куранах)	6,806	**urban-type settlement of Nizhny Kuranakh**; selo of Verkhny Kuranakh; selo of Yakokit
Rural okrugs/Rural settlements	Population	Rural localities in jurisdiction
Anaminsky (Анаминский)	573	**selo of Kutana**
Belletsky (Беллетский)	1,760	**selo of Khatystyr**; selo of Ugoyan
Chagdinsky (Чагдинский)	218	**selo of Chagda**

*Administrative centers are shown in bold

== Economy ==
The economy of the district is based mostly on mining, although the production of building materials, wood processing, and food industry also have presence. There are deposits of gold, silver, platinum, molybdenum, granite, marble, and other minerals in the district.

== Demographics ==
As of the 2021 Census, the ethnic composition was as follows:

- Russians: 84.4%
- Evenks: 5.9%
- Yakuts: 3.4%
- Ukrainians: 1.3%
- Armenians: 0.7%
- Tatars: 0.6%
- others: 3.7%
