= Aldan, Russia =

Aldan Алдан
- Town under district jurisdiction

Other transcription(s)
  - Yakut: Алдан
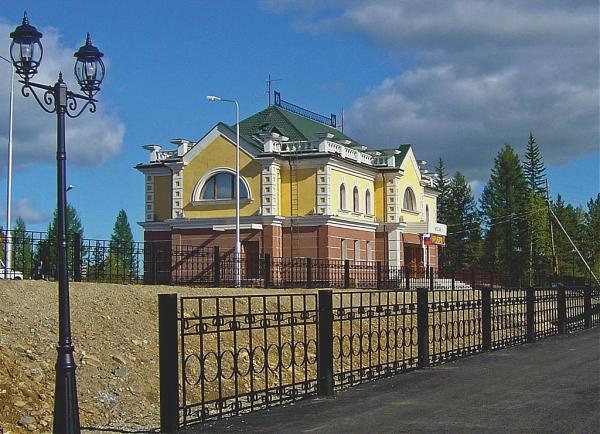
- Aldan railway station

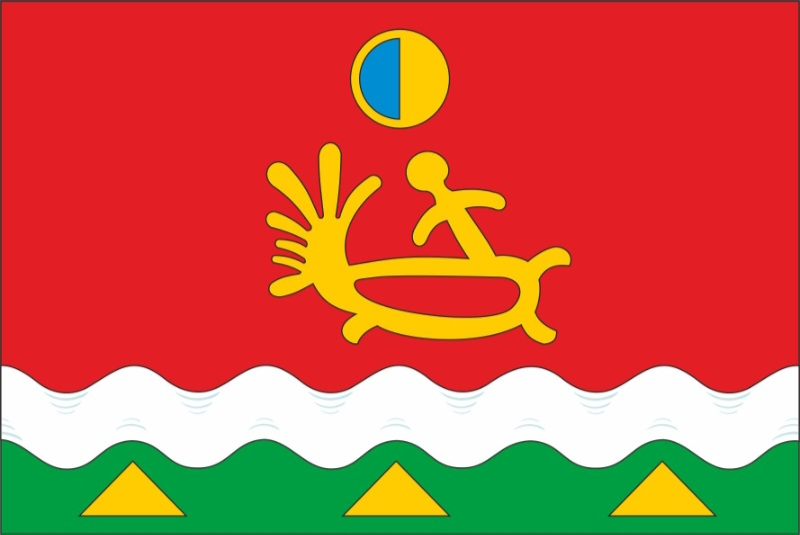
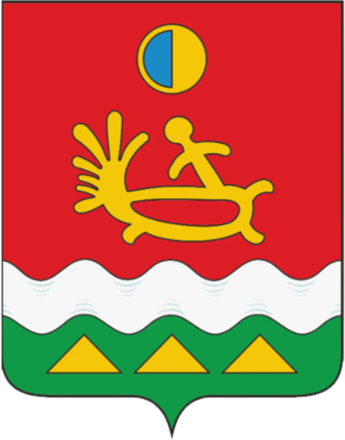
- Flag Coat of arms
- Interactive map of Aldan
- Location of Aldan Aldan (Sakha Republic)
- Coordinates: 58°37′N 125°25′E
- Country: Russia
- Federal subject: Sakha Republic
- Administrative district: Aldansky District
- TownSelsoviet: Aldan
- Founded: 1923
- Town status since: 1939
- Elevation: 650 m (2,130 ft)

Population (2010 Census)
  - Total: 21,275
  - Estimate (January 2016): 20,892 (−1.8%)

Administrative status
  - Capital of: Aldansky District, Town of Aldan

Municipal status
  - Municipal district: Aldansky Municipal District
  - Urban settlement: Aldan Urban Settlement
  - Capital of: Aldansky Municipal District, Aldan Urban Settlement
- Time zone: UTC+9 (UTC+09:00)
- Postal codes: 678900–678902, 678906, 678909
- OKTMO ID: 98603101001

Aldan (Russian: Алдан, IPA: [ɐlˈdan]; Yakut: Алдан) is a gold-mining town (the gorod) and the administrative center of Aldansky District of the Sakha Republic, Russia, located in the Aldan Highlands, in the Aldan River basin, on the stream Orto-Sala near its mouth in the Seligdar River, about 470 kilometers (290 mi) south of the republic's capital of Yakutsk. As of the 2010 Census, its population was 21,275.

Historical population
Year	Pop.	±%
1939	14,022	—
1959	12,358	−11.9%
1970	17,689	+43.1%
1979	20,173	+14.0%
1989	27,090	+34.3%
2002	24,715	−8.8%
2010	21,275	−13.9%
2021	21,590	+1.5%
Source: Census data

== History ==
It was founded in 1923 as Nezametny (Незаме́тный), after discovery of rich gold deposits. It was granted town status and renamed in 1939. During World War II, an airfield was built here for the Alaska-Siberian (ALSIB) air route used to ferry American Lend-Lease aircraft to the Eastern Front.

== Administrative and municipal status ==
Within the framework of administrative divisions, Aldan serves as the administrative center of Aldansky District. As an inhabited locality, Aldan is classified as a town under district jurisdiction. As an administrative division, it is, together with two rural localities, incorporated within Aldansky District as the Town of Aldan. As a municipal division, the Town of Aldan is incorporated within Aldansky Municipal District as Aldan Urban Settlement.

== Economy ==
Aldan remains a productive gold and mica mining center, largely avoiding the large drop in population suffered by most other towns in the Russian Far East in the years after the dissolution of the Soviet Union.

=== Transportation ===
The town stands on the A360 Lena Highway, which connects Yakutsk and Never, as well as on the Amur–Yakutsk Mainline railway. It is served by the Aldan Airport.

== Climate ==
Aldan has the typical eastern Siberian subarctic climate (Köppen Dfc) though it is affected by the Pacific Ocean more than localities in the lower Lena basin, which gives it much heavier rainfall during the summer than most of the republic, as well as a little more snowfall and rather less extreme winter temperatures – though still extremely cold for the latitude and as much as 10 °C or 18 °F colder than settlements actually on the Okhotsk coast. In spite of the less extreme winters vis-à-vis more northerly parts of Sakha, Aldan has never seen any day above freezing from 22 November to 7 March inclusive. Although winters are somewhat less extreme than Yakutsk, summers are actually somewhat cooler, and cloudier, than those northerly areas.

The coldest temperature recorded in Aldan since the weather station was opened in 1937 has been −50.0 °C or −58.0 °F on 20 January 2023 and the hottest 36.5 °C or 97.7 °F on 3 July 2021. February 1969, with a mean temperature of −33.6 °C or −28.5 °F, has been the coldest month on record, shading the preceding January which averaged −33.4 °C or −28.1 °F. The hottest month has been July 1941 which averaged 20.7 °C or 69.3 °F, the wettest August 2006 with 269 millimetres or 10.59 inches of rain, and the driest March 1937 with only 2 millimetres or 0.08 inches of water equivalent.

Climate data for Aldan (1991–2020, extremes 1926–present)
Month	Jan	Feb	Mar	Apr	May	Jun	Jul	Aug	Sep	Oct	Nov	Dec	Year
Record high °C (°F)	−4.0 (24.8)	−1.0 (30.2)	9.1 (48.4)	18.8 (65.8)	27.8 (82.0)	34.3 (93.7)	36.5 (97.7)	35.2 (95.4)	25.8 (78.4)	16.7 (62.1)	6.1 (43.0)	−0.6 (30.9)	35.2 (95.4)
Mean daily maximum °C (°F)	−21.3 (−6.3)	−17.8 (0.0)	−8.9 (16.0)	1.4 (34.5)	11.0 (51.8)	21.0 (69.8)	23.0 (73.4)	19.5 (67.1)	10.2 (50.4)	−1.9 (28.6)	−14.5 (5.9)	−21.8 (−7.2)	0.0 (32.0)
Daily mean °C (°F)	−25.7 (−14.3)	−23 (−9)	−14.9 (5.2)	−3.9 (25.0)	5.5 (41.9)	14.4 (57.9)	16.9 (62.4)	13.6 (56.5)	5.2 (41.4)	−5.9 (21.4)	−18.7 (−1.7)	−25.9 (−14.6)	−5.2 (22.6)
Mean daily minimum °C (°F)	−30.1 (−22.2)	−28.1 (−18.6)	−21.1 (−6.0)	−9.6 (14.7)	0.2 (32.4)	7.6 (45.7)	11.1 (52.0)	8.3 (46.9)	0.9 (33.6)	−9.8 (14.4)	−23 (−9)	−29.9 (−21.8)	−10.3 (13.5)
Record low °C (°F)	−50 (−58)	−46.6 (−51.9)	−42 (−44)	−31.7 (−25.1)	−16 (3)	−5.9 (21.4)	−0.8 (30.6)	−4.4 (24.1)	−16.1 (3.0)	−30.3 (−22.5)	−44.9 (−48.8)	−48.3 (−54.9)	−50 (−58)
Average precipitation mm (inches)	28 (1.1)	26 (1.0)	42 (1.7)	39 (1.5)	76 (3.0)	84 (3.3)	112 (4.4)	112 (4.4)	101 (4.0)	71 (2.8)	41 (1.6)	29 (1.1)	761 (30.0)
Average extreme snow depth cm (inches)	58 (23)	68 (27)	73 (29)	34 (13)	2 (0.8)	0 (0)	0 (0)	0 (0)	2 (0.8)	15 (5.9)	33 (13)	45 (18)	73 (29)
Average rainy days	0	0	0.1	4	16	19	19	18	18	4	0	0	98
Average snowy days	27	26	23	19	13	1	0.03	0.3	10	26	27	28	200
Average relative humidity (%)	78	76	70	62	61	63	71	75	76	77	78	78	72
Mean monthly sunshine hours	66	119	192	210	249	262	276	227	144	93	73	41	1,952
Source 1: Pogoda.ru.net
Source 2: NOAA (sun, 1961–1990)
