= State Anthem of the Sakha Republic =

Саха Өрөспүүбүлүкэтин өрөгөйүн ырыата
English: State Anthem of the Sakha Republic
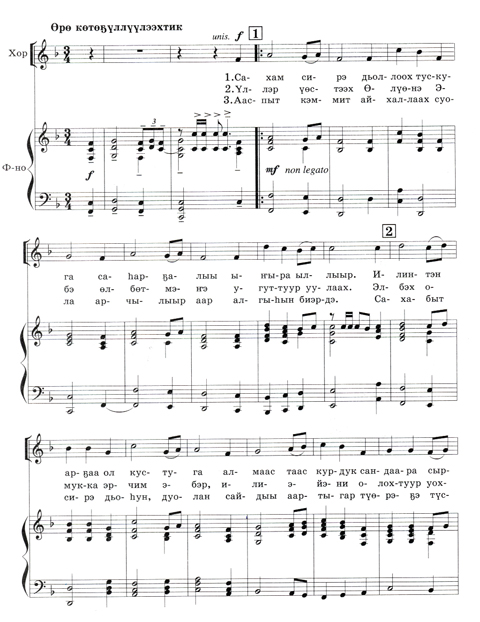
- Music notification of the anthem with words
- Regional anthem of the Sakha Republic, Russia
- Lyrics: Savva Tarasov and Mikhail Timofeyev (Yakut version); Vladimir Fedorov (Russian version)
- Music: Kirill Gerasimov
- Adopted: 15 July 2004

Audio sample
- Official instrumental recording: file; help

Vocal Anthem of Sakha Republic

The State Anthem of the Sakha Republic (Note: Yakut: Саха Өрөспүүбүлүкэтин өрөгөйүн ырыата, romanized: Saqa Öröspüübülüketin örögöyün ırıata; Russian: Государственный гимн Республики Саха, romanized: Gosudarstvennyj gimn Respubliki Saha) is the regional anthem of the Sakha Republic, a federal subject of Russia. It is one of the official symbols of the Sakha Republic, along with the flag and the coat of arms of the Sakha Republic. It was originally written in the Yakut language by Savva Tarasov and Mikhail Timofeyev. The anthem was translated into Russian by Vladimir Fedorov. The music was composed by Kirill Gerasimov. It was officially adopted on 15 July 2004. The anthem's music is played in F major.

== Background ==
=== Creation ===
After the Sakha Republic became a separate constituent state of Russia, its constitution was adopted. At that time, no regional anthem of the Sakha Republic existed. The constitution only stipulates that:

The Republic of Sakha (Yakutia) has the State Emblem, the National Flag and the National Anthem.

— Constitution of the Sakha Republic (1992), Article 140

After the approval of the new constitution, a commission for the creation of the national anthem was formed, with the poet Savva Tarasov as the chairman. A competition for the national anthem was announced. Hundreds of submission for the national anthem was received from throughout the country, but the commission did not approve any of the submission. This caused Savva Tarasov to be replaced from her position in September 1992 by the Deputy Chairman of the Government of the Republic of Sakha, K. Koryakin.

After this failure, the president of the Sakha Republic, Mikhail Nikolayev, entrusted the Ministry of Culture of the Sakha Republic, to continue the search for the anthem. In September 1995, at a meeting of the State Assembly of the Sakha Republic, a proposed anthem was presented. The lyrics of the proposed anthem was written by Dmitry Sivtsev. The music of the anthem was based on the final chorus from the opera Nyurgun Bootur, which was composed by Mark Zhirkov and Heinrich Litinsky, and was re-arranged by Y. Sheykina.

In 2000, a new commission was formed under the leadership of the People's Deputy G. G. Mestnikov. The commission presented a new version of the anthem, titled "Sargı ırıata" (Саргы ырыата; "Song of the Footman"). The lyrics was written by Savva Tarasov and Mikhail Tarasov, and the music was composed by Kirill Gerasimov.

=== Approval ===
On 26 March 2003, the President of the Sakha Republic, Vyacheslav Shtyrov, issued a decree to form a new commission to prepare the issue of the anthem, under the leadership of E.S. Nikitina. The commission chooses the work "Sargı ırıata" and recommended the work to be submitted to the State Assembly of the Sakha Republic. On 15 July 2004, the national anthem was approved by the State Assembly.

On 27 April 2004 the first official performance of the anthem took place on the Day of the Republic.

== Previous anthems ==
=== "Sargılardaaq saqalarbıt" ===
The song "Sargılardaaq saqalarbıt" (Саргылардаах сахаларбыт; Russian: Овеянный счастьем якут; "Sakha, Covered in Happiness") was adopted as the anthem of the Tungus Republic. The anthem itself was composed by Adam Skryabin, and the lyrics of the song was based on the poem "Iççat saqalarga" (Ыччат сахаларга) by Alampa. The poem itself was written in 1917.

=== The Internationale ===
The "Internationale" (Yakut: Интернационал, romanized: İnternatsional, Novgorodov alphabet: Internessijene:l), was the national anthem of the Union of Soviet Socialist Republics (USSR) and the state anthem of the Russian Soviet Federative Socialist Republic from 1922 to 1944.

The Yakut translation of the anthem was planned to be written by Semyon Novgorodov. Unfortunately, due to his nescience of the lyrics of the anthem, he handed over the task to Platon Oyunsky. It was finished on 7 December 1921. The translation was first published in the "Lena Commune" newspaper on 15 December 1921.

=== State Anthem of the Soviet Union ===
The "State Anthem of the Soviet Union" (Yakut: Сэбиэскэй Сойуус өрөгөйүн ырыата, romanized: Sebieskey Soyuus örögöyün ırıata; Russian: Государственный гимн Советского Союза), was the official national anthem of the Union of Soviet Socialist Republics (USSR) and the state anthem of the Russian Soviet Federative Socialist Republic from 1944 to 1991, replacing "The Internationale".

==== Usage of the anthem in Yakut ASSR ====
After the creation of this anthem, the anthem itself was popularized all over the Soviet Union. In the Yakut ASSR, the Yakut Regional Committee of the CPSU ordered all district and city committees to organize the popularization of the anthem with the help of newspapers, radio, and the creation of study groups for the lyrics of the song, including in the Yakut language.

The Council of People's Commissars of the Yakut ASSR also ordered the Radio Committee to record the Yakut version of the anthem and systematically broadcast it. A total of 15,000 copies of the lyrics were published and sent out on colorful flyers.

==== Yakut translation of the anthem ====
The official translation of the anthem in Yakut was approved through a special commission. The commission consisted of the head of the APO of the Yakut regional committee Zakharov, People's Commissar of Education Chemezov, historian G.P. Basharin and composer Mark Zhirkov.

The commission received nine submission of translations from all over the Yakut ASSR. Of all the lyrics submitted, only the lyrics by Nikolai Egorovich Mordinov and poet Sergey Stepanovich Vasilyev was selected. Both were instructed to combine both translation and polish them on 12 January 1944. The final translation was approved by the Presidium of the Supreme Soviet of the USSR on 26 June 1944.

=== "Saqa ırıata" ===
The song "Saqa ırıata" (Саха ырыата; "The Song of Sakha") was originally a poem written by Alampa in 1919. The poem was musicalized by Adam Skryabin.

The song became a symbol of resistance against Soviet rule in the Yakut region from 1921 until 1923, so much that the writer of the poem, Alampa, was labelled as a "nationalist-bourgeoisie". Alampa was sent to the Solovki prison camp after his arrest. The composer of the song, Adam Skryabin, went abroad to evade the persecution and was given trial in absentia.

After a long time, the song was allowed by the Soviet government to be performed publicly. The first public performance of this song was in the Victory Day celebration in the Yakut ASSR in 1945, from a gramophone record. The song was proposed to become the anthem of the Sakha Republic in 1990.

== Lyrics ==
Lyrics are official in both Yakut and Russian languages, along with a singable English translation.

=== Yakut version ===
Cyrillic script

Сахам сирэ дьоллоох тускуга
Саһарҕалыы ыҥыра ыллыыр,
Илинтэн арҕаа ол кустуга
Алмаас таас курдук сандаара сырдыыр.

Хос ырыата:
Барҕа быйаҥнаах Сахам дойдута
Модун Россия киэн туттуута,
Өркөн-өрөгөй тойугун туойдун,
Үүнэр үйэҕэ үрдүү туруохтун!

Үллэр үөстээх Өлүөнэ Эбэ
Өлбөт-мэҥэ угуттуур уулаах.
Элбэх омукка эрчим эбэр,
Или-эйэни олохтуур уохтаах.

Хос ырыата

Ааспыт кэммит айхаллаах суола
Арчылыыр аар алгыһын биэрдэ,
Сахабыт сирэ дьоһун дуолан
Сайдыы аартыгар түөрэҕэ түстэ.

Хос ырыата

Latin script

Saqam sire collooq tuskuga
Saharğalıı ıñıra ıllıır,
İlinten arğas ol kustuga
Almaas taas kurduk sandaara sırdıır.

Qos ırıata:
Barğa bıyañnaaq Saqam doyduta
Modun Rossiya kien tuttuuta,
Örkön-örögöy toyugun tuoydun,
Üüner üyeğe ürdüü turuoqtun!

Üller üösteeq Ölüöne Ebe
Ölböt-meñe uguttuur uulaaq.
Elbeq omukka erçim eber,
İli-eyeni oloqtuur uoqtaaq.

Qos ırıata

Aaspıt kemmit ayqallaaq suola
Arçılıır aar algıhın bierde,
Saqabıt sire cohun duolan
Saydıı aartıgar tüöreğe tüste.

Qos ırıata

IPA transcription (Note: See Yakut language#Phonology.)

[sɑ.qχɑm sɪ.rɛ ɟʝɔɫ.ɫɔːqχ tʊs.kʊ.gɑ |]
[sɑ.ɦɑr.ʁɑ.ɫɨː ɨŋ.ɨ.rɑ ɨɫ.ɫɨːr ‖]
[ɪ.lɪn.tɛn ɑr.ʁɑː ɔɫ kʊs.tʊ.gɑ |]
[ɑɫ.mɑːs tɑːs kʊr.dʊk sɑn.dɑː.rɑ sɨr.dɨːr ‖]

[qχɔs ɨ.rɯə.tɑ]
[bɑr.ʁɑ bɨ.jɑŋ.nɑːqχ sɑ.qχɑm dɔj.dʊ.tɑ |]
[mɔ.dʊn rɔs.si.jɑ kiɛn tʊt.tuː.tɑ ‖]
[œr.kœn œ.rœ.ɡœj tɔ.jʊ.gʊn tuɔj.dʊn |]
[yː.nɛr ʏ.jɛ.ɣɛ ʏr.dyː tʊ.ruɔqχ.tʊn ‖]

[ʏl.lɛr yœs.tɛːqχ œ.lyœ.nɛ ɛ.bɛ |]
[œl.bœt mɛŋ.ɛ ʊ.gʊt.tuːr uː.ɫɑːqχ ‖]
[ɛl.bɛqχ ɔ.mʊk.kɑ ɛr.cçɪm ɛ.bɛr |]
[ɪ.lɪ ɛ.jɛ.nɪ ɔ.ɫɔqχ.tuːr uɔqχ.tɑːqχ ‖]

[qχɔs ɨ.rɯə.tɑ]

[ɑːs.pɨt kɛm.mɪt ɑj.qχɑɫ.ɫɑːqχ suɔ.ɫɑ |]
[ɑr.cçɨ.ɫɨːr ɑːr ɑɫ.gɨ.ɦɨn biɛr.dɛ ‖]
[sɑ.qχɑ.bɨt sɪ.rɛ ɟʝɔ.ɦʊn duɔ.ɫɑn |]
[sɑj.dɨː ɑːr.tɨ.gɑr tyœ.ɾɛ.ɣɛ tʏs.tɛ ‖]

[qχɔs ɨ.rɯə.tɑ]

=== Russian version ===
Cyrillic script

Якутия, ты светом зари
К добру и счастью всех нас зовёшь,
Алмазной радугой ты горишь
И нас к победам грядущим ведёшь.

Припев:
Цвети и крепни, родная земля,
Расти и славься, Якутия.
Краса и гордость России ты всей,
Тебя раздольней нет и щедрей.

Привольно Лена наша течёт,
Водой живой до края полна.
Она согласье и силу несёт,
Дарует мир всем народам она.

Припев

Земля Саха, святыни твои
С вершин веков напутствуют нас.
Мы путь продолжили предков своих,
И с честью мы их исполним наказ.

Припев

Latin script

Jakutija, ty svetom zari
K dobru i sčastiu vseh nas zovjošj,
Almaznoj radugoj ty gorišj
I nas k pobedam grjaduščim vedjoš.

Pripev:
Cveti i krepni, rodnaja zemlja,
Rasti i slavjsja, Jakutija.
Krasa i gordostj Rossiji ty vsej,
Tebja razdoljnej net i ščedrej.

Privoljno Lena naša tečjot,
Vodoj živoj do kraja polna.
Ona soglasje i silu nesjot
Darujet mir vsem narodam ona.

Pripev

Zemlja Saha, svjatyni tvoji
S veršin vekov naputstvujut nas.
My putj prodolžili predkov svojih,
I s čestiu my ih ispolnim nakaz.

Pripev

=== English version ===
O Sakha land, thou dawn's shining light,
Thou bring'st us to good will and delight.
Like a fine rainbow thou shinest bright,
May thy destined victory be in sight.

Chorus:
Shine and enriched be, o native land!
Blossom and rejoice, o Sakha land!
Thy beauty and honour of Russia stand,
Blessed be thy land bountiful and grand!

Abundantly our Lena floweth,
Around thy wide borders with great strength.
She beareth harmony and good health,
Peace to our people she bestoweth.

Chorus

O Sakha land, thy sacred places
Guide and save us from peaks of aeons.
We shall uphold our forebears' path,
Their mandate we shall fulfill with faith.

Chorus
