= Symbols of the Head of the Sakha Republic =

Official symbols of a Russian regional head

The symbols of the Head of the Sakha Republic (Russian: Символы Главы Республики Саха (Якутия), romanized: Simvoly Glavy Respubliki Sakha (Yakutiya)) denote the authority of the head of the Sakha Republic, an autonomous region of Russia. The symbols consisted of the ceremonial badge and the Standard of the Head of the Sakha Republic. Up until 2004, a ceremonial mace was also included as one of the symbols.

== Legislation ==
The legislation that defines the symbols is "On the Official Symbols of the Sakha Republic". The specific section that regulates the symbols of the law is in Chapter 26, Section 5. This section was last amended on 9 October 2014.

The legislation explains the shape of the symbols of the Head of the Sakha Republic as well as their usage. The legislation approves the symbols of the Head of the Republic of Sakha, their description and their provisions by the Head of the Republic of Sakha with the presentation by the Heraldic Council of Sakha.

== Badges ==
=== Ceremonial badge ===
Ceremonial Badge of the Head of the Sakha Republic
- Церемониальный знак Главы Республики Саха (Якутия)
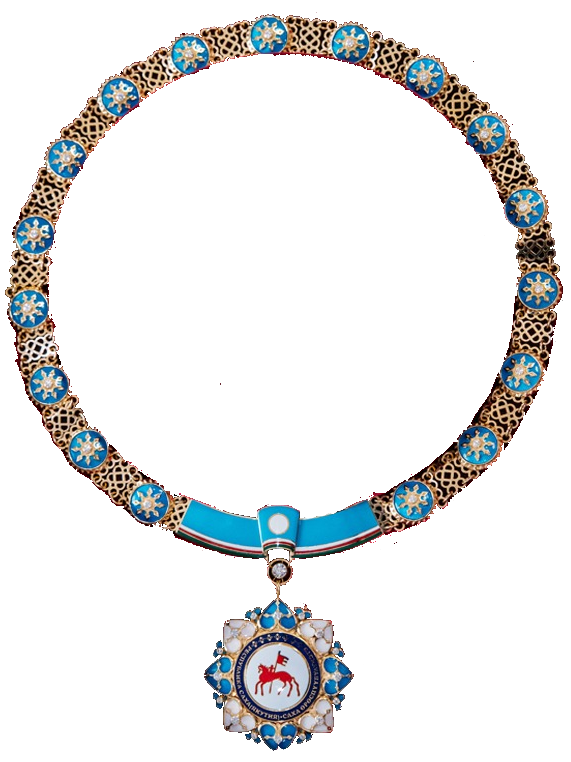
- Date: July 15, 2004
- Country: Sakha Republic
- Head of the Sakha Republic: Aysen Nikolaev

The Ceremonial Badge of the Head of the Sakha Republic (Russian: Церемониальный знак Главы Республики Саха (Якутия), romanized: Tseremonial'nyy znak Glavy Respubliki Sakha (Yakutiya)) is the official symbol of the Head of the Sakha Republic. It is worn as a neck chain, and is awarded after the Head of the Republic of Sakha takes the oath of office.

==== Design ====
The badge's design is a figure decoration. It is worn on a neck chain. Elements of the Yakut national ornament are superimposed on the sign of the Order of the Polar Star, the highest award of the Republic of Sakha.

==== Usage ====
The badge was used to symbolize the role of the Head. The badge is worn by the Head during state celebrations; major official events and ceremonies; when presenting state awards of the Sakha Republic, and in other cases of performance of official duties at the Head's discretion.

=== Standard ===
Standard of the Head of the Sakha Republic
- Proportion: 1:1
- Adopted: 15 July 2004

The Standard of the Head of the Sakha Republic (Russian: Штандарт Главы Республики Саха, romanized: Štandart Glavy Respubliki Sakha) is the official standard of the Head of the Sakha Republic. It is used at buildings and on vehicles to denote his presence.

==== Design ====
The standard design is an exact copy of the national flag, with the addition of the coat of arms of the Sakha Republic replacing the white circle. The standard ratio is 1:1, based on the fact that the flag is square shaped, and The Presidential Flag is framed with golden fringes.

==== Usage ====
The original standard was placed in the office of the President of the Republic of Sakha. The standard can be duplicated and can be raised or hung over the main residence of the President of the Republic of Sakha. The standard was also hung over in the permanent mission of the Republic of Sakha.

== See also ==
- Head of the Sakha Republic
- Flag of the Sakha Republic
