= List of Sakha flags =

This is a list of Sakha flags used throughout the history of the Sakha Republic, a federal subject of Russia and the world's largest subdivision.

== National flag ==
Flag	Date	Use	Description
	1992–present	State flag of the Sakha Republic	A flag consisted of four horizontal stripes : light blue (3/4 of the flag's width), white (1/16), red (1/16), and green (1/8). The blue stripe is charged with a white disc in the center, 2/5 of the flag's width.

== Historical flags ==
Flag	Date	Use	Description
	1924–1925	Flag of the Tungus Republic	A tricolour consisted of white, green, and black.
	1926–1937	First flag of the Yakut ASSR	A red flag with a blue canton in the top left of the flag on which the northern lights was depicted with the yellow inscription "Yakut ASSR" in the Yakut language.
	1937–1939	Second flag of the Yakut ASSR.	
	1939–1954	Third flag of the Yakut ASSR.	
	1954–1978	Fourth flag of the Yakut ASSR.	
	1978–1990	Fifth flag of the Yakut ASSR.	
	1990–1992	Sixth flag of the Yakut ASSR.	

== Standards ==
Flag	Date	Use	Description
	1992–2016	Standard of the president of the Sakha Republic	A square version of the flag of the Sakha Republic, with the white disc being replaced by the state emblem.
	2016–Present	Standard of the head of the Sakha Republic	A square version of the flag of the Sakha Republic, with the white disc being replaced by the state emblem.

== Ethnic flags ==
Flag	Date	Use	Description
	2011	Flag of Evenks	A tricolor consisted of white, black, and blue stripes, with the white stripe being charged with a red sun, and the black stripe being charged with a reindeer horn.

== Administrative Divisions flags ==
Flag	Date	Use	Description
	1996–Present	Flag of Yakutsk	
	?–Present	Flag of Zhatay	
	?–Present	Flag of Abyysky District	
	?–Present	Flag of Aldansky District	
	?–Present	Flag of Amginsky District	
	?–Present	Flag of Anabarsky District	
	?–Present	Flag of Bulunsky District	
	?–Present	Flag of Churapchinsky District	
	?–Present	Flag of Eveno-Bytantaysky National District	
	?–Present	Flag of Gorny District	
	?–Present	Flag of Khangalassky District	
	?–Present	Flag of Kobyaysky District	
	?–Present	Flag of Lensky District	
	?–Present	Flag of Megino-Kangalassky District	
	?–Present	Flag of Mirninsky District	
	?–Present	Flag of Momsky District	
	2013–Present	Flag of Namsky District	
	?–2013	Flag of Namsky District	
	2003–Present	Flag of Neryungrinsky District	
	?–2003	Flag of Neryungrinsky District	
	?–Present	Flag of Nyurbinsky District	
	?–Present	Flag of Olenyoksky District	
	?–Present	Flag of Olyokminsky District	
	?–Present	Flag of Oymyakonsky District	
	?–Present	Flag of Srednekolymsky District	
	?–Present	Flag of Suntarsky District	
	?–?	Flag of Suntarsky District	
	?–Present	Flag of Tattinsky District	
	2003–Present	Flag of Tomponsky District	
	?–2003	Flag of Tomponsky District	
	?–Present	Flag of Ust-Aldansky District	
	?–Present	Flag of Ust-Maysky District	
	?–Present	Flag of Ust-Yansky District	
	?–Present	Flag of Verkhnekolymsky District	
	?–Present	Flag of Verkhnevilyuysky District	
	?–Present	Flag Verkhoyansky District	
	2003–Present	Flag of Vilyuysky District	A horizontal tricolor of blue, yellow and green.
	?–2003	Flag of Vilyuysky District	A horizontal quadricolor of blue, yellow, green and dark blue.
	?–Present	Flag of Zhigansky District	

== Other ==
Flag	Date	Use	Description
	?–Present	Flag of Aykhal	
	?–Present	Flag of Berkakit	
	?–Present	Flag of Chulman	
	?–Present	Flag of Dzhebariki-Khaya	
	?–Present	Flag of Khandyga	
	?–Present	Flag of Sangar	A horizontal bicolor of white and blue.
	?–Present	Flag of Ust-Maya	
	?–Present	Flag of Zyryanka	

== See also ==
- Flag of the Sakha Republic
- List of Russian flags
