= Mikhail Artemyev =

Yakut revolutionary

- Михаил Константинович Артемьев
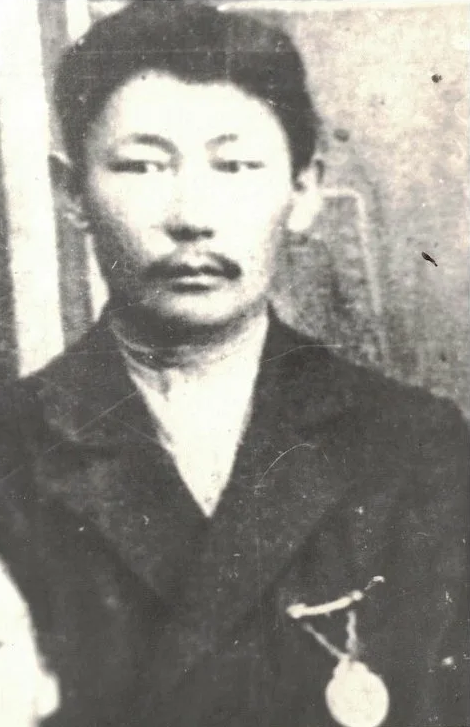
- Born: November 1888/1889/1894; Betyunsk Nasleg, Boturussky Ulus, Yakutsk Oblast, Russian Empire
- Died: March 27, 1928 (aged 39/38/33); Yakutsk, Yakut ASSR
- Cause of death: Execution
- Known for: one of the leaders of the Tungus Republic
- Criminal charge: Article 59, paragraph 3 of the Criminal Code of the RSFSR
- Criminal penalty: Execution
- Father: Konstantin Artemyev

Mikhail Konstantinovich Artemyev (November 1888 – March 27, 1928) was a participant in the Russian Civil War. He was also the leader of several uprisings against Soviet power in the Eastern Siberia region.

== Early life ==
He was born in November 1888 in a poor peasant family. He graduated from the 4th grade of the Yakut Real School. First, he worked as a clerk in his native nasleg, then as a clerk in the 1st Amginsky district council, as a warden in the Bethunskoy Nasleg, a foreman in the Uranai and Bethune tribal administrations, and a teacher in the Amga settlement.

== Military career ==
An active participant in the Russian Civil War, Artemyev was initially on the side of the Bolsheviks. On March 17, 1920, the Yakut Revolutionary Headquarters of the Red Army appointed him as the Commissioner of the parish. On March 15, 1920, he was re-appointed as the chairman of the Revolutionary Committee. At the same time, he continued teaching at various educational institutions in Yakutia. He became gradually disappointed in the Soviet regime.

In 1922, he fled from Yakutsk and joined the rebel army Korobeynikov and joined the Yakut revolt. After the failure of the revolt, he hid with his squad in the taigas. In early 1923, he joined the army of General Anatoly Pepelyayev, with whom he served as leader of the White Guerrilla units. After the defeat of Pepelyayev in March 1923, he again hid in the taiga, and participated in the Tungus Uprising from 1924 until 1925, which established the Provisional Tungus Central National Government. He became one of the detachment commanders.

The uprising ended with a peace agreement between the leaders of the uprising and representatives of the leadership of the Yakut Autonomous Soviet Socialist Republic. Artemyev and his detachments laid down their arms on May 9, 1925. In accordance with the agreement, was amnestied. Prior to the beginning of 1927, he was in the Soviet service (secretary of the Nelkan parish, guide and translator), took up housekeeping.

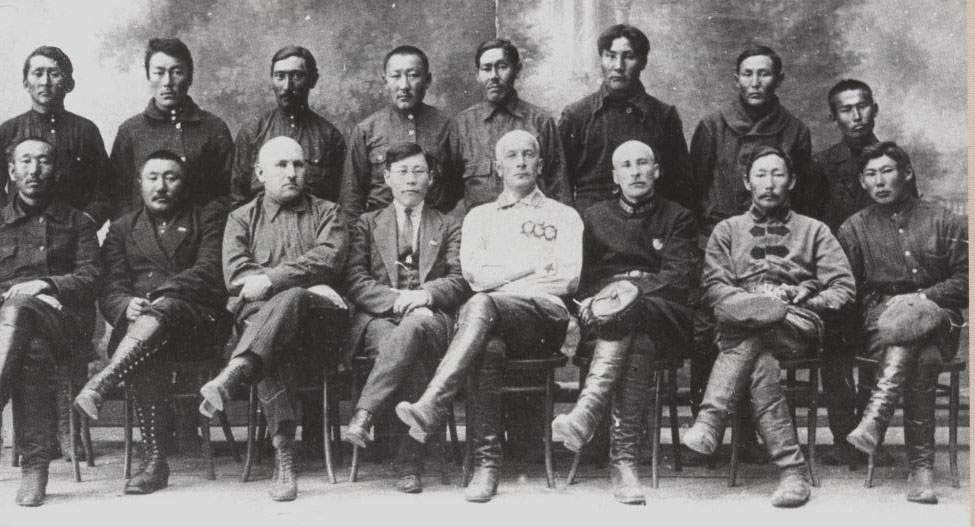
Members of the Council of People's Commissars of the Yakut ASSR with amnestied leaders of the 1925 rebels, Mikhail is in the bottom right in the light suit.

In 1927, he went underground, with the beginning of the movement "confederalists" joined a rebel army. In October, he was elected chief of staff of a partisan detachment. In January 1928, he voluntarily surrendered to the Red Army, after which he was tried and sentenced to death by firing squad. The sentence was carried out on March 27, 1928, in Yakutsk.

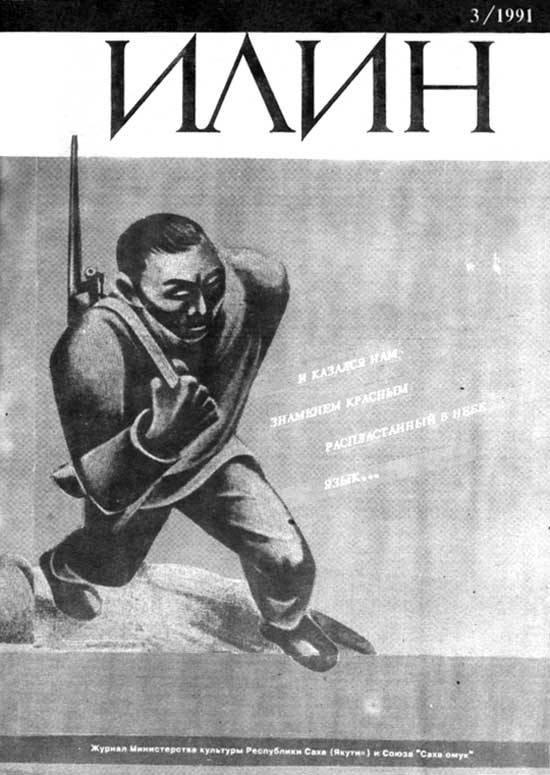
Magazine issue featuring Yakut revolutionary Mikhail Artemyev

On October 11, 1999, by the decision of the Prosecutor's Office of the Sakha Republic, Artemyev was posthumously rehabilitated.
