= Semyon Novgorodov =

Yakut politician and linguist

- Семён Новгородов
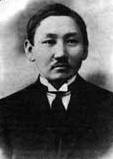
- Born: February 13, 1892; 2nd Khatlinsky nasleg of Boturus Ulus, Sakha
- Died: February 28, 1924 (aged 32); Leningrad
- Other name: Сэмэн Ноҕоруодап
- Known for: Yakut linguist, creator of a Yakut alphabet

Semyon Andreyevich Novgorodov (Yakut: Семен Андреевич Новгородов, romanized: Semen Andreyevich Novgorodov, the older orthography Yakut: Сэмэн Ноҕоруодап, romanized: Semen Noğoruodap; Russian: Семён Андреевич Новгородов; February 13, 1892 – 28 February 1924) was a Yakut politician and linguist, the creator of the first Latin Yakut alphabet.

== Early life ==
Semyon Andreyevich Novgorodov was born in the 2nd Khatlinsky nasleg of Boturus Ulus (now Boltoginsky nasleg of Churapchinsky Ulus of Sakha). His father was poor, but later acquired some wealth. He taught his son to read Old Church Slavonic. Later, Novgorodov studied under sexton Andrey Vinokurov, who taught him Russian and arithmetic. Then he visited the private school of exiled I. T. Tsypenko in Churapcha. As Semyon was a brilliant pupil, in 1905 he entered Yakutsk Realschule (Реальное училище). During his time at the college, Novgorodov read widely. Novgorodov started to collect Yakut folklore, his works were published in the first Yakut literature magazine Saqa sanata, which was published in 1912–1913.

== Yakut writing ==
As the earliest Yakut writing was invented by Russians, it did not reflect some features of the Yakut language well. Novgorodov's first writings used a mixture of the Cyrillic and Latin alphabets. After Novgorodov graduated from Realschule, he taught in Yelovsky elementary school and Vilyuy municipal school. In 1913 he came to Saint Petersburg and entered the Arab-Persian-Turkish class of the Oriental department of St. Petersburg University. In December 1913 Novgorodov participated in the All-Russian Congress of Popular Teachers, where he presented a paper about teaching in the national languages of indigenous peoples and the necessity of schoolbooks in the Yakut language.

One year later, Novgorodov entered a Mongol-Manchu-Turkish class. In 1914, on the instructions of Russian Committee on the Exploration of the Central and East Asia, he collected folklore in Tattinsky Ulus, Yakutia. Summer holidays of 1915 he spent in Ufa Governorate, where he practiced the Tatar language of the Tatar colonists and collected folklore of Tiptär Tatars.

Exploring a variety of different writing systems, he was attracted by the International Phonetic Alphabet. He argued for the adoption of this alphabet to the Yakut language. Some Yakut intelligentsia led by poet A. Ye. Kulakovsky opposed him, advocating Cyrillic. Novgorodov's arguments were these:

1. Yakut Cyrillic writing had only fifty years of history, and the majority of Yakuts were illiterate.
2. There was no convention on the use of the script and it was used in two variants: Betling (the Academic variant) and Khitrov (the Missionary variant).

The main difficulty was caused by numerous umlauts and brevity and duration signs. Novgorodov found that they reduced the speed of writing. Further, the missionary variant was totally incorrect with respect to pronunciation.

== As a public figure ==
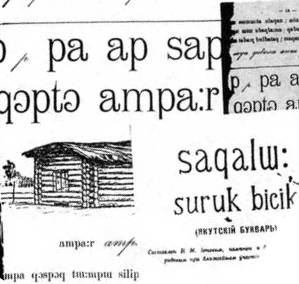
A fragment of suruk bicik

Novgorodov spent the winter of 1916–1917 teaching in a Yakutsk school. His The Main Problems of Yakut Intelligentsia was published in Yakutskie Vedomosti newspaper. Novgorodov supported the February Revolution of 1917. He participated in many meetings and was even elected to the Public Security Committee of Yakutsk. At the First Free Congress of Yakut Peasants, Novgorodov presented his IPA-based new Yakut alphabet and spoke about the necessity of publishing the first Yakut primer (in collaboration with V.M. Ionov). The congress supported him, and during spring and summer 1917 Novgorodov, with the help of N. Ye. Afanasyev, remade the primer, which was named saqalɯ: suruk bicik. This alphabet was not the IPA at all, as some characters were unable to be represented in local presses.

In autumn 1917 he returned to Petrograd to continue his education. In summer 1918 he was contracted as an interpreter to a hydrographic expedition to the Lena River's delta. However, the Russian Civil War disturbed his plans. Thus, he ultimately spent 4 months working in Ehirit-Buhachat Aymak of Irkutsk Governorate. As he studied Mongolian, he fluently spoke Buryat language and participated in local meetings. In March 1919 he published several articles where he argued for a chair of Yakutology in Irkutsk University and noted to the similarity of modern Yakut and ancient Turkic, found in Orkhon inscriptions. Later his theory was verified by other scholars.

In September 1919 Novgorodov reached Yakutsk and joined the Saqa aymaq cultural society. As the Kolchak government didn't support his ideas, he was pleased with the return of Soviet power. He became the head of the Yakutsk Oblast Exploring Department, the head of its linguistic section, a participant of expeditions to the eastern uluses of Yakutia, a lecturer of propagandist and pedagogy courses, a head of the committee for Yakut schoolbooks. As the region had a problem with printing-plants, Novgorodov was entrusted to buy in Central Russia in 1920.

In 1922 he published the re-written primer, basta:nnɯ suruk bicik. In the same year, the Yakut language was introduced in schools of Yakut ASSR. In 1923, the new Yakut font was made in Petrograd. Another primer, suruk bicik and a book for reading a:ʃar kinige were published. This primer was much better than the others and consisted of five parts: fiction, history, geography, medicine and folklore. In 1923–24 the primer was spread all over Yakutia and likbezy (special schools for illiterates) started their work. As new presses appeared in the republic, it became possible for the local leaders to print their own newspapers and the first of these, kɯ:m, was published in 1923. Until 1930, when Yakut was switched to Jaꞑalif, more than 200 books were published in the Novgorodov alphabet, including 30 schoolbooks. A new alphabet gave a major impulse to the development of Yakut culture. In 1922 Novgorodov graduated the university and along with M. K. Ammosov represented Yakutia in Narkomnats (Peoples' Committee for Nationalities). He participated in the commission for delimitation of Yakutia's borders. Also Novgorodov was a deputy of IX Congress of the Soviets, elected by Yakutsk Governorate Congress of the Revolutionary Committee. Semyon Novgorodov died of uraemia in the prime of his life at February 28, 1924.

== Publishing ==
- (in Russian) Основные задачи якутской интеллигенции
- (in Russian) Якутский язык и грамота в качестве необязательных предметов
- (in Russian) Первые шаги якутской письменности
