= Coat of arms of the Sakha Republic =

Official symbol of the Sakha Republic

Sakha Republic

Versions
- Emblem of the Sakha Republic under Soviet Russia as Yakut ASSR

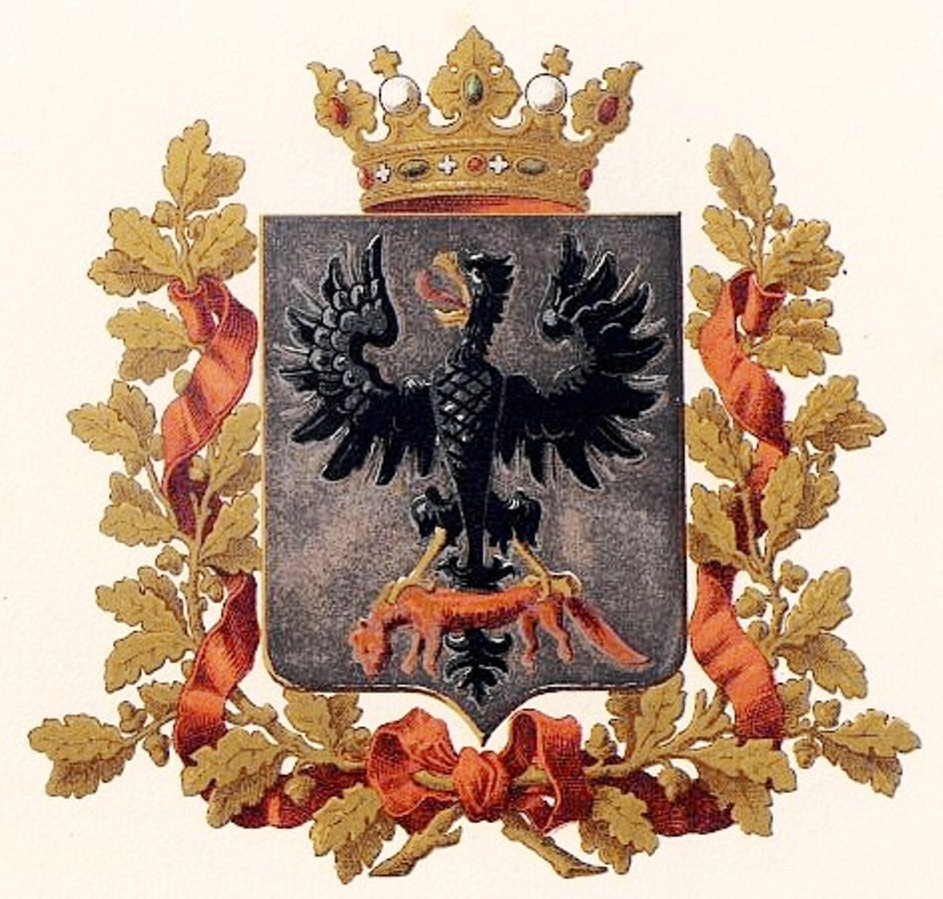
- Coat of arms of the Yakutsk Oblast
- Armiger: Sakha Republic
- Adopted: 26 December 1992
- Motto: Республика Саха (Якутия) • Саха Өрөспүүбүлүкэтэ

The coat of arms of the Sakha Republic (Yakut: Саха Өрөспүүбүлүкэтин дьаралыга, Saqa Öröspüübülüketin caralıga; Russian: Герб Республики Саха, Gerb Respubliki Sakha), in the Russian Federation, is an official symbol of the Sakha Republic, alongside the flag and the national anthem of the Sakha Republic. The coat of arms consists of a circle, in the center of which is a red silhouette of a rider on horseback holding a banner, based on the prehistoric petroglyphs of the "Shishkin pisanitsa", against a white sun background. The central image is framed with a traditional Sakha ornament in the form of seven rhombic crystal-like figures and the inscriptions "Республика Саха (Якутия) • Саха Өрөспүүбүлүкэтэ". This coat of arms has been used officially since 26 December 1992.

Prior to 1992, the Sakha Republic existed as the Yakut Autonomous Soviet Socialist Republic. Prior to 1937, Yakut ASSR used a coat of arms with the basis of korenizatsiya, on which it contained the depiction of the Lena River, Aurora, and the name of the ASSR. After 1937, the coat of arms of the Yakut ASSR is identical with the emblem of the Russian SFSR.

== Symbolism ==
The central element of the coat of arms is an image of an ancient rider with a banner. The image was one of the rock paintings found near the village of Shishkino in 1745 by members of the Great Northern Expedition of the Russian Academy of Sciences. The painting was believed to be made by Kurykans. Scientists believe that the rider depicted in the painting are the leaders of the clans and tribes of the Kurykans. The red banner in the image symbolized the unity and the strength of the Kurykan tribes.

The seven rhombic crystal-like figures of faceted diamonds symbolizes one of the natural resources of the republic. The amount of the faceted diamonds also symbolizes the unity of the peoples living in Yakutia : Yakuts, Russians, Evenks, Evens, Chukchi, Dolgans, and Yukagirs.

== History ==
=== As the Yakutsk Oblast ===
The coat of arms of the Yakutsk Oblast was approved on 5 July 1878. The coat of arms consisted of silver shield, with a black eagle holding a scarlet sable in its claws. The shield is decorated with the Tsar's crown and is surrounded by golden oak leaves, intertwined by Alexander's ribbon.

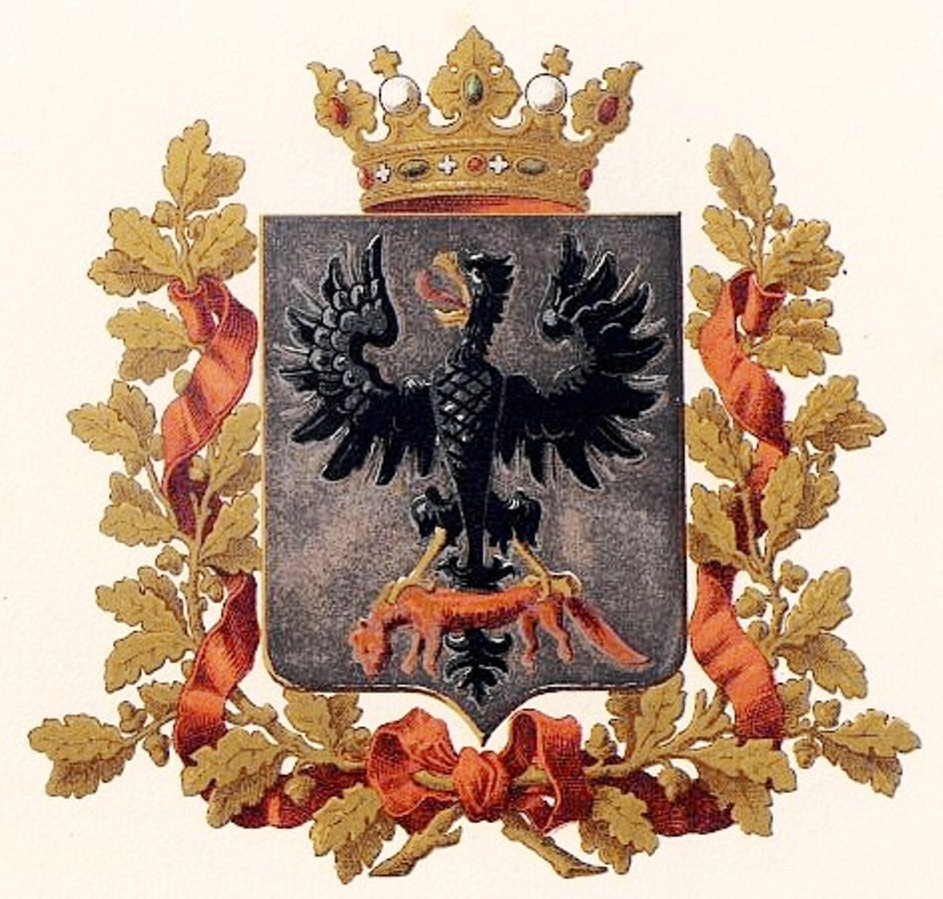
Version by the Interior Ministry of the Russian Empire, 1880

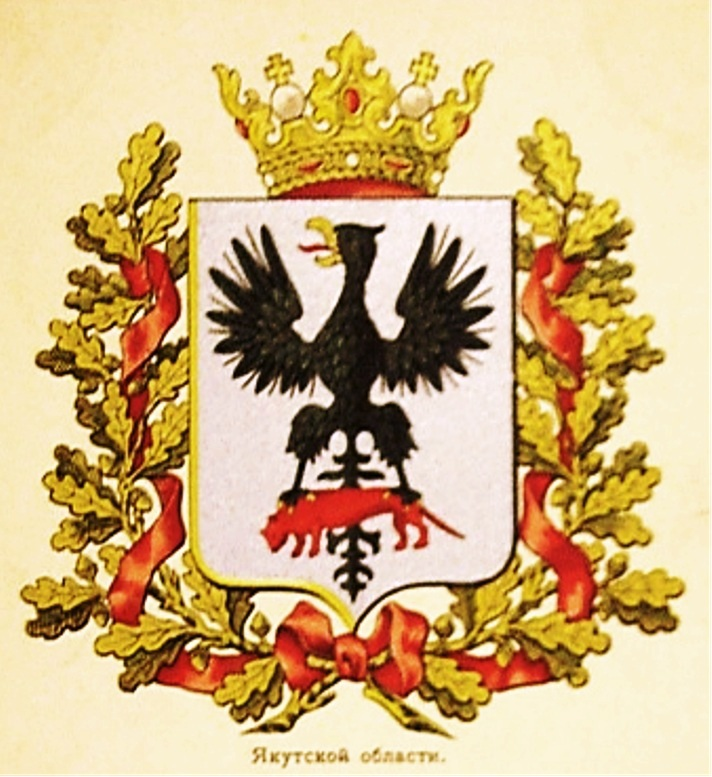
Version by Sukachova, 1878

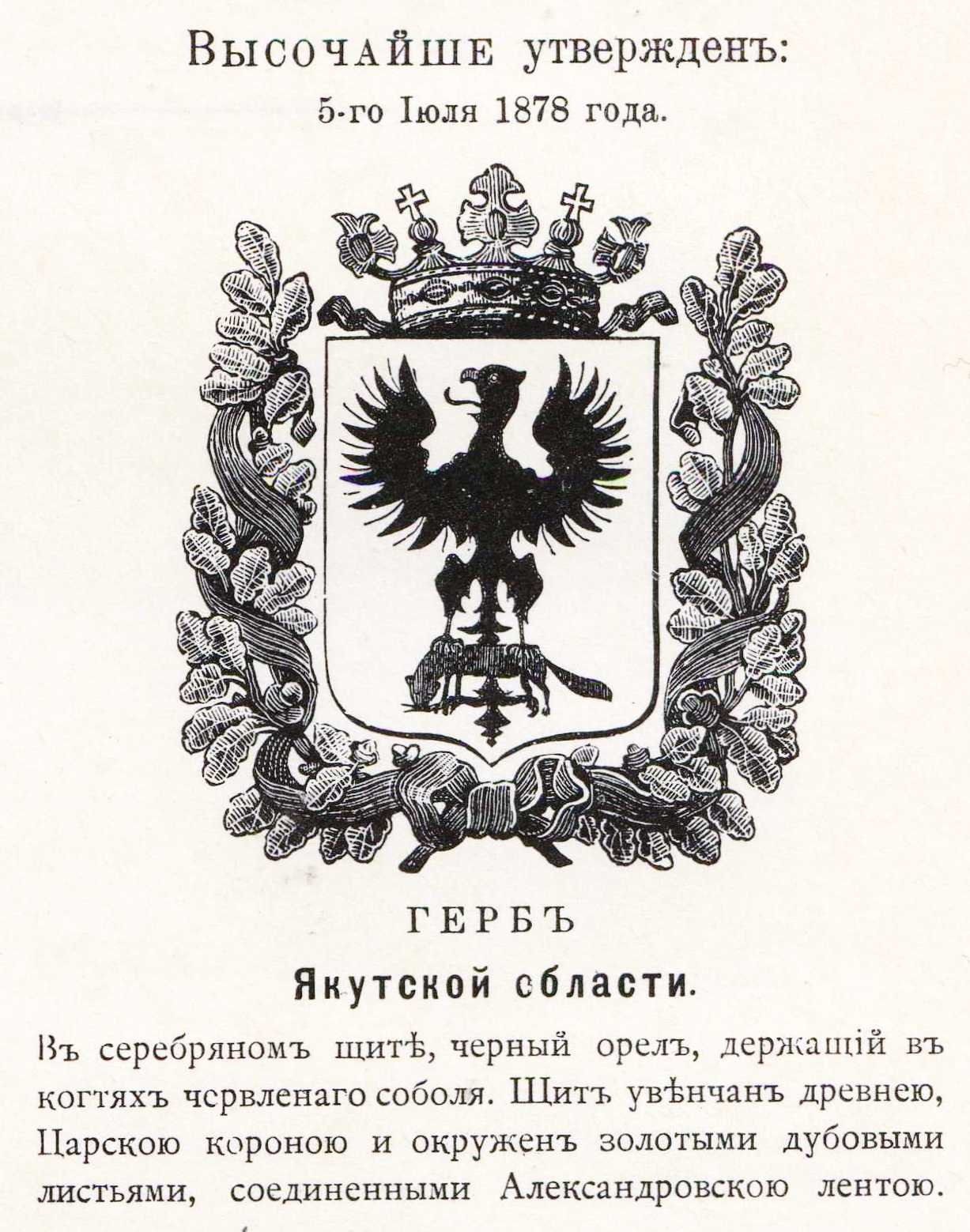
Version by Pavel Vinkler, 1899

=== As the Yakut ASSR ===
Emblem of the Yakut Autonomous Soviet Socialist Republic
- Armiger: Yakut Autonomous Soviet Socialist Republic
- Adopted: 13 May 1937
- Crest: Red star
- Supporters: Wheat and Cotton
- Motto: (1926–1939); Barь dojdular proletarijdara, qolbohuꞑ! (1939–1990); Бары дойдулар пролетарийдара, холбоһуҥ! (Yakut) Пролетарии всех стран, соединяйтесь! (Russian) "Workers of the world, unite!"

==== First version ====
The first emblem of the Yakut ASSR was described in the Constitution of the Yakut ASSR, which was approved by the Fourth All-Yakut Congress of Soviets on September 25, 1926. Article 118 of the constitution contained description of the emblem of the Yakut ASSR:

The State Emblem of the Yakut ASSR consists of an image in the rays of the Northern Lights of a part of the globe adjoining the circumpolar circle, a schematic outline of the boundaries of the Yakut ASSR and the main waterway of the Lena River, a gold sickle and hammer, placed cross on the cross by handles to the bottom, from the ears, closing with a red five-pointed star, and at the base of the crown there are golden forks and rakes, placed cross on the cross with handles to the bottom with the inscription:

a) "YAKUT AUTONOMOUS SOVIET SOCIALIST REPUBLIC" and

b) "PROLETARIANS OF ALL COUNTRIES, UNITE!" in Yakut language ".

— Constitution of the Yakut Autonomous Soviet Socialist Republic (1926), Article 118

==== Second version ====
On March 9, 1937, the extraordinary 9th All-Yakut Congress of Soviets approved a new Constitution of the Yakut ASSR. Article 108 of the Constitution describes the emblem of the Yakut ASSR:

The state emblem of the Yakut ASSR is the state emblem of the RSFSR, which consists of an image of a gold sickle and a hammer, placed on shelves, handles to the bottom, a red phon in the sun and framed with ears, inscribed "RSFSR" and "Proletarians of all countries, unite!" in Russian and in Yakut language, with an additional inscription under the letters "РСФСР", letters of a smaller size - "ЯАССР" in the Yakut language.

— Constitution of the Yakut Autonomous Soviet Socialist Republic (1937), Article 108

The new emblem of the Yakut ASSR was reconfirmed by the approval through the Decree of the Presidium of the Central Executive Committee of the Yakut ASSR on May 13, 1938.

===== First revision =====
In 1939, the Yakut language shifted its writing method from Latin alphabet to Cyrillic alphabet. Hence, the inscription on the emblem changed.

===== Second revision =====
On May 31, 1978, the 8th extraordinary session of the Supreme Council of the Yakut ASSR adopted a new Constitution of the Yakut ASSR. Article 157 of the constitution describes the Emblem of the Yakut ASSR:

The State Emblem of the Yakut Autonomous Soviet Socialist Republic was the State Emblem of the RSFSR, which is an image of a hammer and sickle on a red background, in the rays of a solonetz and framed with ears of wheat, with the inscription "RSFSR"in Russian and "Proletarians of all countries, unite!" and the Yakut languages with the inscription "Yakut ASSR" in Russian and Yakut over the inscription "RSFSR" with letters of a smaller size. At the top of the emblem is a five-pointed star.

— Constitution of the Yakut Autonomous Soviet Socialist Republic (1978), Article 157

A red star with a gold border was added to the top of the emblem.

This design was reconfirmed with the Decree of the Supreme Soviet of the Yakut ASSR on July 27, 1978.

==== Gallery ====
1926–1929

1929–1937

1937–1939

1939–1978

1978–1990

1990–1992

=== As the Sakha (Yakut) Republic ===
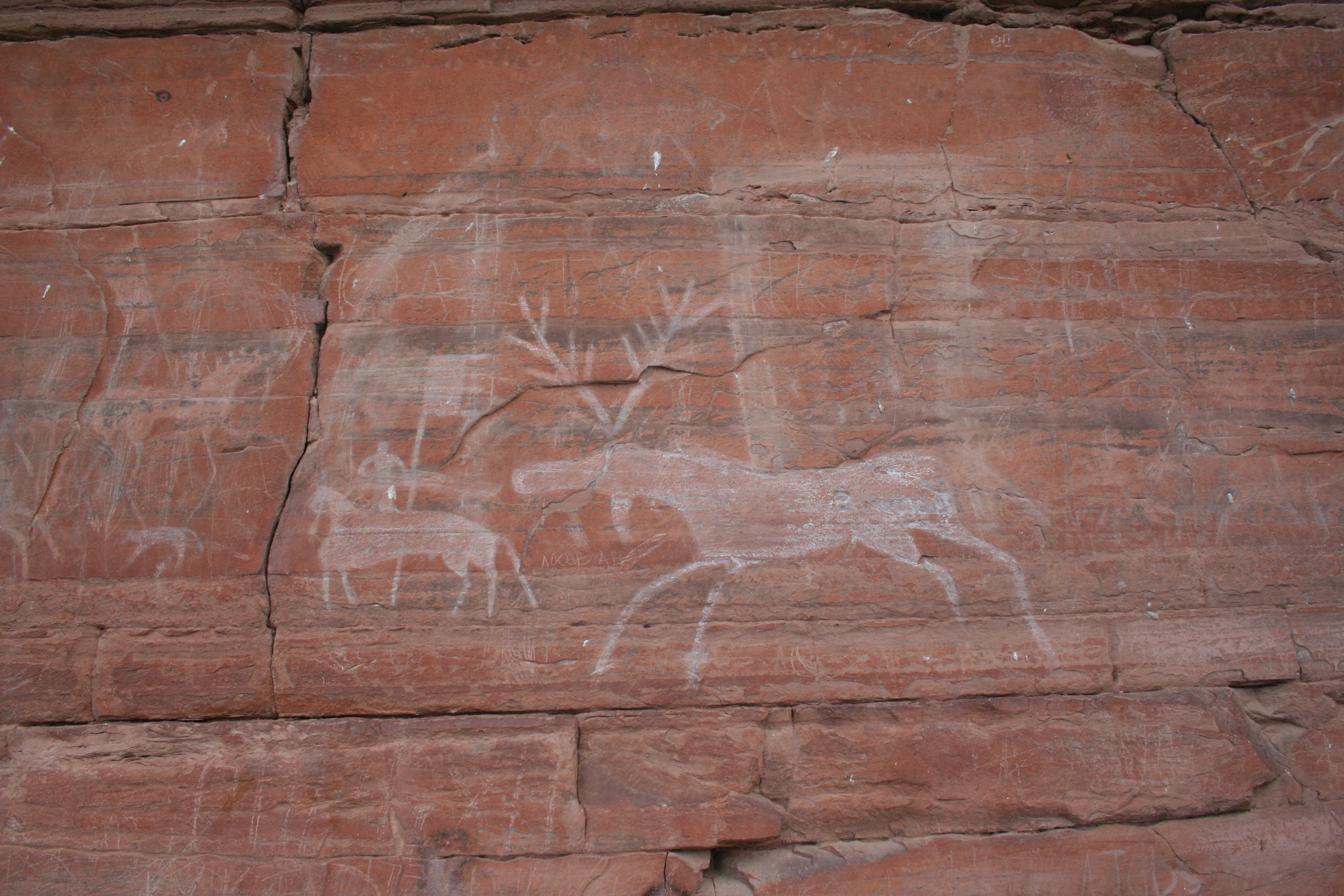
Petroglyph of a horseman carrying a banner as part of the Shishkinsky drawings

On 4 April 1992, the Sakha Republic adopted a new constitution. The coat of arms of the Sakha Republic had not been made, so the constitution only states that :

The Republic of Sakha (Yakutia) has the State Emblem, the National Flag and the National Anthem.

— Constitution of the Sakha Republic (1992), Article 140

The description of the coat of arms was approved and was inserted into the Constitution of the Sakha Republic by the amendments of 22 July 2008.

The coat of arms of the Republic of Sakha (Yakutia) is a circle in the center of which is an image of an ancient rider with a banner from the rock carvings of the Lena River, against the background of a solar disk – a shield placed in a frame with the traditional national ornament in the form of seven rhombic crystal-like figures and the inscriptions "Республика Саха (Якутия)" and "Саха Республиката".

In the colored version of the coat of arms of the Republic of Sakha (Yakutia), the sun is in silver, the rider is in dark red, the frame is in dark blue, and the ornament and the inscription are in white.

— Constitution of the Sakha Republic (1992, amended 2008), Article 47.2

==== Word change ====
In June 2016, the government enacted a word change of the word "Republic" in the Yakut language. The Yakut word for Republic, Республиката, was changed into Өрөспүүбүлүкэтэ. (Note: This change was intended to bring back the original Yakut word, based on the Novgorodov Alphabet : ꭢrꭢspy:bylykete. The transition from Өрөспүүбүлүкэтэ to Республиката itself occurred in 1939, after the transition of Yakut language to the Cyrillic script.) This change affected the inscriptions on the coat of arms.

On 15 June 2016, to officially adopt this change of word, the constitution was amended, and on 25 October 2016, the inscription on the coat of arms was changed by the Law "On the Official Symbols of the Republic of Sakha (Yakutia)".

26 December 1992 – 25 October 2016

25 October 2016 –

== Designers ==
- Osipov, Afanasy Nikolayevich (born 1928) – painter, People's Artist of the USSR, laureate of the I. Repin State Prize of Russia, Honored Artist of the Sakha Republic, full member of the Russian Academy of Arts. Member of the Union of Artists of the Russian Federation.
- Parnikov, Vasily Semenovich (born 1935) – graphic artist, Honored Artist of the Sakha Republic. Member of the Union of Artists of the Russian Federation.
- Ignatiev, Vladimir Nikiforovich (born 1948) – graphic artist, designer.
- Potapov, Innokenty Afanasyevich (born 1932) – art historian, art history, Honored Artist of the Russian Federation, laureate of the State Prize of the Sakha Republic named after Platon Oyunsky, corresponding member of the Russian Academy of Arts. Member of the Union of Artists of the Russian Federation.
