= List of Russian flags =

This is a list of Russian flags, including federal, administrative, and military flags, as well as historical flags.

== Flags of the Russian Federation ==
=== State flag ===
Flag	Date	Use	Description
	1991–1993	Civil and state flag, civil and state ensign	Flag of the Russian Federation from 12 December 1991 to 11 December 1993. Still included in the State Heraldic Register.
	1993–present	Civil and state flag, civil and state ensign	Proportion changed from 1:2 to 2:3. First, the Decree of the President of the Russian Federation "On the State Flag of the Russian Federation", adopted on December 11, 1993, then Constitutional law "On the State Flag of the Russian Federation" adopted on 25 December 2000.

=== Presidential flags ===
Standard	Date	Use	Description
	1994–present	Presidential standard	Current Presidential standard of the Russian Federation.
	1994–present	Flag of the President as the Commander-in-Chief of the Armed Forces	

== Military flags ==
Following the collapse of the Soviet Union in 1991, for a brief time, many Soviet era flags were still in use until new designs replaced them in the early 2000s. The new flags of the Russian Armed Forces are heavily inspired by the regimental banners and flags of the late Imperial Russian Army and Navy.

=== Flags of service branches ===
Flag	Date	Use	Description
	2003–present	Flag of the Ministry of Defence	
	2004–present	Flag of the Ground Forces	
	2000–present	Flag of the Navy	In 1992, the ensign of the Imperial Russian Navy was revived and replaced the Soviet era Naval flag, however the new design used a lighter shade of blue, rather than the traditional dark blue. On December 29, 2000, the flag was changed to its original historical appearance with dark blue.
	2015–present	Flag of the Aerospace Forces	
	2004–present	Flag of the Airborne Forces	A bicolour of horizontal stripes, blue and green defaced with the Russian Airborne Forces emblem.
	2004–present	Flag of the Strategic Rocket Forces	
	2025–present	Flag of the Unmanned Systems Forces	

=== Flags of the Ground Forces ===
Flags of the arms of the Ground Forces of the Russian Federation

Flag	Date	Use	Description
	2005–	Flag of the Engineer Troops	
	2005–	Flag of the Nuclear, Biological and Chemical Protection Troops	
	2006–	Flag of the Missile Troops and Artillery	
	2007–	Flag of the Air Defence Troops of the Ground Forces	Not to be confused with the Air Defence Troops of the Aerospace Forces.
	2007–	Flag of the Communication Troops	
	2005–	Flag of the Main Directorate of the General Staff	
	2007–	Flag of the Electronic Warfare Troops	
	2007–	Flag of the Railway Troops	
	?–	Flag of the Special Operations Forces	

=== Flags of the Aerospace Forces ===
The Aerospace Forces are a branch of the Armed Forces of the Russian Federation, it has three arms, the Russian Air Force, the Air Defense Forces, and the Russian Space Forces. The Air Defense Forces does not have a flag.

Flag	Date	Use	Description
	2004–	Flag of the Air Force	
	2015–	Flag of the Space Forces	Light blue field with the Russian Space Forces emblem (Space Forces Circumflex).

=== Flags of the Rear of the Armed Forces ===
Flag	Date	Use	Description
	2004–2009	Flag of the Rear of the Armed Forces	
	2010–	Flag of the Logistical Support of the Russian Armed Forces	

=== Military district flags ===
Flag	Date	Use	Description
	2016–2024	Flag of Western Military District	
	2016–	Flag of Southern Military District	
	2016–	Flag of Central Military District	
	2016–	Flag of Eastern Military District	

=== Banners of the Armed Forces ===
Each branch of the Armed Forces has a representative banner, one for the Ground Forces, the Aerospace Forces, the Navy, and one to represent the entire Armed Forces as a whole.

Obverse (Front)	Reverse (Back)	Date	Use	Description
		2000–2003	Banner of the Armed Forces	The first banner of the Armed Forces of the Russian Federation was introduced on 8 December 2000, later confirmed by Federation Council on 20 December and signed by Vladimir Putin on 29 December. It was a plain red field, it symbolized the traditional red color of the Armed Forces of the Soviet Union.
		2003–	Banner of the Armed Forces	The present banner of the Armed Forces of Russian Federation is introduced under a resolution by State Duma in June 2003. This banner consists of two double-headed eagles, on the obverse side is the coat of arms of the Russian Federation, and on the reverse side is the middle emblem of the armed forces of the Russian Federation. The banner follows the principles and format of historically older Russian military flags that were last used prior to the Russian Revolution in 1917. It also contains four stars in each corner of the banner to symbolize the heritage of the Soviet Armed Forces. The reverse side also contains two pieces of text written in old style Slavic typeface, the top side of the banner contains the inscription "Fatherland" ("Отечество") and on the bottom side the inscription reads "Duty [and] Honor" ("Долг Честь").
		2002–	Banner of the Ground Forces	The banner of the Russian Ground Forces was introduced by decree No. 141 on February 4, 2002, by Vladimir Putin. It is similar to the above banner, but doesn't have stars and inscriptions, on the reverse side is the middle emblem of the Russian Ground Forces.
		2002–	Banner of the Air Force/Aerospace Forces	The banner of the Russian Air Forces was introduced by decree No. 141 on February 4, 2002, by Vladimir Putin. It became the banner of the newly created Aerospace Forces branch, which saw the merger between the Russian Air Forces and the Air Defence Forces on August 1, 2015.
		2000–	Banner of the Navy	The ensign of the Russian Navy is used as the banner of the Russian Navy. On December 29, 2000, Russian President Vladimir Putin signed a federal law making the naval ensign of the Russian navy the official banner of the Russian Navy.

=== Victory Banner ===
The Victory Banner was a historical banner raised atop of the Reichstag building in Berlin, by the Red Army, on May 1, 1945. It signified the victory over Nazi Germany, and served as the main symbol of victory of the Soviet people. It was amended in Russian law in 1996, but with a new design to distance the new Russian state from any usage of Communist iconography. In 2007, following pressure from Red Army veterans, the original Victory Banner design replaced the 1996 variant, and has since then served its usage in virtually every single Victory Day parade held across Russia.

Banner	Date	Use	Description
	1945	Raised over the Reichstag	Digital recreation of the flag that was raised over the Reichstag on 2 May 1945.
	1996–2007	Symbol of Victory Banner	The Symbol of Victory Banner was an alternative to using the historic Victory Banner, which contained the hammer and sickle.
	2007–	Banner of Victory	The Banner of Victory raised on the Reichstag in 1945. Replicas of the Victory Banner can be used alongside the national flag on Victory Day.

=== Command Standards ===
Standard	Date	Use	Description
	2003–	Standard of the Minister of Defence	
	?–	Standard of the Chief of the General Staff	
	?–	Standard of the Commander-in-Chief of the Ground Forces	
	?–	Standard of the Commander-in-Chief of the Navy	
	2015–	Standard of the Commander-in-Chief of the Aerospace Forces	
	?–	Standard of the Commander of the Air Force – Deputy Commander-in-Chief of the Aerospace Forces	
	?–	Standard of the Commander of the Strategic Missile Forces	
	?–	Standard of the Commander of the Space Forces	
	?–	Standard of the Commander of the Airborne Forces	

=== Paramilitary flags ===
This section covers flags of the various government paramilitary organizations which are not part of the Russian military, but are structured similarly by ranking system, uniforms, and are equipped with both light and heavy arms.

==== Flags of non-military security forces ====
Flag	Date	Use	Description
	1992–	Flag of the Ministry of Emergency Situations	
	1992–	Departmental flag of the Ministry of Emergency Situations	
	2003–	Flag of the Border Service of the Federal Security Service	
	2005–	Flag of the Federal Service for Military-Technical Cooperation	
	2008–	Ensign of the Coast Guard	A blue and white saltire on a light green background.
	2019–	Ensign of the National Guard Naval Service Corps	A blue and white saltire on a chestnut background.
	1994–	Flag of the Federal Customs Service	A white saltire on a dark green background.
	2001–	Flag of the Courier Service	
	2005–	Flag of Federal Penitentiary Service	
	?–	Flag of the Main Directorate of Special Programs of the President	
	2008–	Flag of the Office of the Prosecutor General	
	?–	Flag of the Investigative Committee	
	2006–	Flag of Federal Bailiff Service	
	2012–	Flag of the Ministry of Internal Affairs	
	2007–2016	Flag of Federal Migration Service	
	2000–2016	Flag of the Federal Service for Special Construction	
	?–	Flag of the State Automobile Inspectorate	

==== Flags of special services ====
Flag	Date	Use	Description
	2001–2003	Flag of Federal Agency of the Governmental Communication and the Information at the President	
	2002–	Flag of the Federal Protective Service	
	2010–	Flag of the Federal Security Service	
	2008–	Flag of Director of the Federal Security Service	
	2009–	Flag of Foreign Intelligence Service	
	2015–2016	Flag of the Internal Troops	
	2016–	Flag of National Guard Forces Command	
	2016–	Flag of the National Guard	

=== Pennants ===
Flag	Date	Use	Description
	2011–	Pennant of the Ministry of Health	
	2009–	Pennant of the Federal Agency for Fishery	
	2009–	Pennant of the Chief of the Federal Agency for Fishery	

== Historical flags of Russia ==
=== Civil ensign and national flag ===
Prior to the creation of the first official flag of Russia in 1858, several merchant flags were used to represent Russia, the most notable being the White, Blue, and Red tricolor devised by Tsar Peter the Great. The historical State Flags of Russia were signed by decree to officially represent the country as a whole. The Black, Yellow, and White tricolor became the first official flag of Russia in 1858, with previous flags being de facto unofficial flags of Russia.

Flag	Date	Use	Description
	1668–1693	Civil ensign of the Tsardom of Russia	Ensign of the Oryol ship.
	1693–1721	Civil ensign of the Tsardom of Russia	
	1721–1896	Civil ensign of the Russian Empire	Peter the Great's tricolour was the merchant flag of the Russian Empire. However, the flags used by the Russian Army were regimental flags with the Double-Headed Eagle, the official Imperial symbol, in the centre. The Imperial Standard was the black Double-Headed Eagle displayed on a golden banner, which represented the Empire and the Emperor, the absolute ruler of Russia. When the black-yellow-white flag was in use between 1858 and 1896, the white-blue-red flag was still used as a merchant ensign.
	1858–1896	State flag of the Russian Empire	On 11 June 1858, by decree of Alexander II, the heraldic colors of the empire were approved for flags, banners and other items (draperies, rosettes, etc.). It became the first State flag of Russia in 1865. The white-blue-red flag was reintroduced in 1883 but the black-yellow-white remained in use until it was fully replaced in all circumstances in 1896.
	1896–1917	State flag of the Russian Empire	On 28 April 1883, Alexander III amended the 1858 decree "on flags for decorating buildings on solemn occasions" to be replaced exclusively with the white-blue-red colours. This meant that the white-blue-red flag was now to be used on land in addition to at seas. It fully replaced the black-yellow-white flag when it became the only official National flag in time for the coronation of Nicholas II in 1896.
	1917–1918	National flag of the Russian Republic	The Russian Provisional Government and the Russian Republic kept using the same flag after the monarchy was overthrown in the February Revolution. During the Russian Civil War, it was also used by the Russian State in 1918–1920 and the White Guards overall until their defeat in 1923.
	1918–1920	National flag of the Russian State	The Russian Provisional Government and the Russian Republic kept using the same flag after the monarchy was overthrown in the February Revolution. During the Russian Civil War, it was also used by the Russian State in 1918–1920 and the White Guards overall until their defeat in 1923.
	13 April – 17 June 1918	State flag of the Russian Soviet Federative Socialist Republic	The first flag of the RSFSR was established by decree on 13 April 1918. However the law never provided an official drawing or depiction. Instead, a simple red flag was commonly used. The description of the decree stated that the "flag of the Russian Republic is set on a red banner with the inscription: Russian Socialist Federative Soviet Republic (Russian: Российская Советская Федеративная Социалистическая Республика)." The decree however did not specify the exact shade of red used on the flag, nor the exact placement and size of the inscription, the ratio of the flag itself and the colour and font of the words. There is no evidence to suggest such a flag was ever produced and used.
	1918–1937	State flag of the Russian Soviet Federative Socialist Republic	On 17 June 1918, a decree was established on the new state flag of the RSFSR. This time, the law provided an official image for the flag. The ratio of the flag was 1:2; in the upper hoist corner the letters "R.S.F.S.R" appeared in old Slavonic font and were surrounded by a golden border.
	1937–1954	State flag of the Russian Soviet Federative Socialist Republic	Red banner with stylized "RSFSR" abbreviation in gold Cyrillic letters in the honour canton.
	1954–1991	State flag of the Russian Soviet Federative Socialist Republic	The flag of the Soviet Union with a blue band at the hoist. It lacked the hammer and sickle on its reverse side.
	1991–1993	State flag of the Russian Soviet Federative Socialist Republic	Used by protesters during the August Coup and proclaimed national flag on 22 August 1991, then formally adopted as the state flag on 1 November.

=== Flag of the Soviet Union ===
Flag	Date	Use	Description
	1922–1923	State flag of the Soviet Union	The first flag of the Soviet Union is a red flag with the state emblem in the center and fimbriated in white.
	1923–1924	State flag of the Soviet Union	The second flag of the Soviet Union with the golden fimbriated canton, adopted shortly after the end of the Russian Civil War.
	1924–1936	State flag of the Soviet Union	The third flag of the Soviet Union.
	1936–1955	State flag of the Soviet Union	The fourth flag of the Soviet Union, this design was prominently used during the Second World War.
	1955–1991	State flag of the Soviet Union	The fifth and final flag of the Soviet Union.

=== Personal flags ===
==== Monarch flags ====
Standard	Date	Use	Description
	c. 1462	Flag of the Grand Prince of Moscow	Adopted under Ivan the Great.
	1693–1703	Flag of the Tsar of Russia	Adopted under the rule of Peter the Great.
	1703–1742	Imperial Standard	Adopted under the rule of Peter the Great.
	1742–1799; 1801–1828	Imperial Standard	Russian Imperial Standard used at palaces.
	1799–1801	Imperial Standard	Russian Imperial Standard introduced by Paul I. This flag is depicted on many documents of that era.
	c. 1835	Imperial Standard	In the album of flags of 1834, an Imperial Standard used at palaces was reported.
	1883–1917	Imperial Standard	Standard of the Emperor of Russia on land, adopted in 1883. The emblems on the wings represent Kazan, Poland, Taurida, the Kievan Rus', Finland, Georgia, Siberia, and Astrakhan.

==== Other Royal flags ====
Standard	Date	Use	Description
	c. 1848	Standard of the Empress of Russia	
	?–1917	Standard of the Empress of Russia	
	?–1917	Standard of the Tsesarevich of Russia	
	?–1917	Standard of the Empress Princes of Russia	
	?–1917	Standard of the Grand Duke of Russia	
	?–1917	Standard of the Grand Duchess of Russia	
	?–1917	Ensign of the Tsesarevich of Russia	
	?–1917	Ensign of the Grand Duke of Russia	
	1862–1870	Flag of the Grand Duke of the Caucasus	
	1870–1917	Flag of the Grand Duke of the Caucasus	

==== Flag of the Supreme Ruler ====
Standard	Date	Use	Description
	1919–1920	Flag of the Supreme Ruler of the Russian State	Used by Admiral Alexander Kolchak during the Russian Civil War.

==== Presidential standard ====
Standard	Date	Use	Description
	1991	Presidential standard of the Russian SFSR	Unofficial standard of the president of the Russian Soviet Federative Socialist Republic, used during the inauguration of Boris Yeltsin on 10 July 1991. A law establishing the official standard for the President of Russia was not created until 1994, at the time of Yeltsin's first inauguration, an impromptu standard was created solely for the event, but without any official decree or design.

=== Banners ===
Banner	Date	Use	Description
	1380	Banner of Dmitry Donskoy at the Battle of Kulikovo	Calvary Cross on a red pennant.
	1380	Flag of the Russian principalities at the Battle of Kulikovo.	An image of Jesus Christ portrayed on a red flag, with the inscription “IC XC NIKA” (an abbreviated Greek expression meaning “Jesus Christ conquers”) on all corners surrounding an icon of the Image of Edessa. Nowadays used as a "Russian Orthodox flag".
	c. 1385	Banner of the Novgorod Republic	Banner used by the Novgorod Republic, depicting a white castle on a red field.
	1552	Banner of the Most Merciful Savior	Banner used by Ivan IV during the Siege of Kazan.
	1610s	Banner of Dmitry Pozharsky	Battle banner of the Second Volunteer Army depicting appearance of Archangel Michael to Joshua.
	1696	Armorial Banner of Peter the Great	The armorial banner of Peter the Great was created in 1696. Made from red taffeta with a white border, the banner depicted a golden eagle hovering over the sea. On the chest of the eagle in the circle is the Savior, next to the Holy Spirit and the holy apostles Peter and Paul. The banner was likely made for the second Azov campaign.

=== Historical pennants ===
Flag	Date	Use	Description
	?–1697	Masthead pennant of the Tsardom of Russia	
	c. 1881	Pennant of the Ministry of Railways	
	?–1917	Pennant of the Emperor of Russia	
	?–1917	Pennant of the Empress of Russia	
	?–1917	Pennant of the Tsesarevich of Russia	
	?–1917	Pennant of the Tsesarevna of Russia	
	?–1917	Pennant of the Grand Duke of Russia	
	?–1917	Pennant of the Grand Duchess of Russia	
	?–1917	Pennant of the Admiral General of Royal blood	
	1919–1920	Pennant of the Supreme Ruler of the Russian State	

=== Proposed flags ===
Flag	Submitted	Planned use	Description
	1914–1917	National flag of the Russian Empire	A tricolour of horizontal stripes, white, blue, and red, with a yellow canton with the coat of arms. Introduced as a flag for private use on the outbreak of World War I on 8 September 1914 with introduction as a national flag planned for after the war, hence never officially adopted.
	1917–1918	State flag of the Russian SFSR	Two black-and-white images of the first state flag of the RSFSR are known from published sources. According to one of them, which appears to be the most reliable, the flag had a width-to-length ratio of 12:19, and bore the full name of the republic written in five lines of capital letters. At the same time, it cannot be ruled out that this image represents only a drawing of the canton of the state flag.
	1917–1918	State flag of the Russian SFSR	Two black-and-white images of the first state flag of the RSFSR are known from published sources. According to one of them, which appears to be the most reliable, the flag had a width-to-length ratio of 12:19, and bore the full name of the republic written in five lines of capital letters. At the same time, it cannot be ruled out that this image represents only a drawing of the canton of the state flag.
	10 July 1918	State flag of the Russian SFSR	The 1918 Russian flag featuring a cross was a variant used during the Russian Civil War, often associated with the White movement or specific regional forces. A notable version, this 1918 flag with a cross, was used, frequently incorporating the blue St. Andrew's Cross (often associated with the Russian Navy).
	1948–1949	State flag of the Russian SFSR	A proposal for the state flag of the RSFSR was created by artist Alexey Kokorekin. It added white and blue horizontal stripes at the bottom, each one taking 1/6 of the flag's height.
	c. 1949	State flag of the Russian SFSR	Another proposal with the traditional Russian tricolour at the bottom.
	1947	State flag of the Russian SFSR	Another proposal by Petr Bakhmurov
	c. 1950	State flag of the Russian SFSR	Another proposal for the state flag of the RSFSR was created by Mikhail Rodionov. It consisted of a traditional tricolour flag and a hammer and a sickle in the middle of the flag. Because of his proposal, he was accused of anti-Sovietism in 1950, at the Leningrad affair case.
	1994; 1997	State flag of the Russian Federation	Project flags of Russia after the dissolution of the USSR with communist symbols slightly modified, submitted multiple times in the State Duma by Communist and Agrarian deputies.
	2007	Symbol of Victory Banner	As described in a bill from 2007 vetoed by Vladimir Putin's presidential decree. The flag was used on public display during celebrations of the Victory Day and other events related to past wars during the first decade of the 2000s, along with the state flag.
	2011	State flag of the Russian Federation	On April 18, Vladimir Zhirinovsky with the LDPR party proposed to the State Duma the adoption of the Russian Imperial (Romanov's) flag as the official flag of Russia.
	2022	State flag of the Russian Federation	On April 19, the CPRF proposed to the State Duma the adoption of the Soviet flag as the official flag of Russia.
	2022	State flag of the Russian Federation	Used by Russian anti-war protestors in opposition to the invasion of Ukraine, as well as by the Russian opposition to Putin and the Freedom of Russia Legion.

== Flags of Russian cities ==
Flag	Date	Use	Description
	2003–	Flag of Abakan	Two red and blue vertical stripes and a white background with the emblem to the hoist.
	2005–	Flag of Anadyr	A blue background with a white wavy strip and a yellow bear holding a red fish.
	?–	Flag of Anapa	A sun with a brick wall below the sun and what appears to be waves.
	2026–	Flag of Arkhangelsk	A white background with a wide blue diagonal stripe from lower hoist to upper fly and the coat of arms of Arkhangelsk in the center.
	1997–	Flag of Astrakhan	A crown above sword on a white background with a blue wave pattern at the bottom.
	2021–	Flag of Barnaul	The arms of the city of Barnaul on a blue background.
	1999–	Flag of Belgorod	Two horizontal stripes: blue above white. In the roof there is an image of the figures of the coat of arms of the city.
	1998–	Flag of Birobidzhan	
	1998–	Flag of Blagoveshchensk	
	2016–	Flag of Bryansk	
	?–	Flag of Buy, Kostroma	
	2001–	Flag of Cheboksary	
	2002–	Flag of Chelyabinsk	A Bactrian camel in front of a wall on a green and yellow background.
	2002–	Flag of Cherepovets	A blue pall on a golden background.
	2006–	Flag of Chita	A triband of green, white, and red with a yellow triangle at the hoist.
	Flag of Elista		
	?–	Flag of Eveno-Bytantaysky National District	
	1997–	Flag of Gorno-Altaysk	
	2010–	Flag of Grozny	
	2014–	Flag of Henichesk	
	1996–	Flag of Irkutsk	A black "Babr" or siberian tiger holding a squirrel in its mouth standing on a grassy island on a white and blue background.
	?–	Flag of Istra District, Istrinsky District	A sun with a face on a blue background.
	2003–	Flag of Ivanovo	A woman using a spindle on an all blue background.
	2000–	Flag of Izhevsk	A white and blue vertical bicolor with a pair of leaves, an arrow, and what appears to be a pair of wire cutters.
	1996–	Flag of Kaliningrad	A coat of arms in front of a ship on an all blue background.
	2000–	Flag of Kaluga	
	2004–	Flag of Kazan	A zilant walking on a mostly white background with a thin green line at the bottom.
	2019–	Flag of Kemerovo	
	1999–	Flag of Kerch	
	2007–	Flag of Khabarovsk	
	2002–	Flag of Khanty-Mansiysk	
	?–	Flag of Khangalassky District	
	2010–	Flag of Kirov	A hand holding a bow beneath a cross on an all yellow background.
	2002–	Flag of Kostroma	
	2006–	Flag of Krasnodar	
	1995–	Flag of Krasnoyarsk	
	2001–	Flag of Kurgan	Two horizontal stripes, green and white, and on the green stripe, there are white-colored triangular kurgan mounds.
	2008–	Flag of Kursk	A white flag with a blue diagonal band charged with birds.
	2016–	Flag of Kyzyl	
	2005–	Flag of Lipetsk	A linden tree depicted on a green hill on a yellow background.
	1999–	Flag of Magadan	
	2010–	Flag of Magas	
	2004–	Flag of Magnitogorsk	A black triangle on a silver-colored background.
	2006–	Flag of Makhachkala	
	2008–	Flag of Maykop	
	1995–	Flag of Moscow	Saint George with a lance riding on a silver horse stabbing a zilant on a dark red background.
	2011–	Flag of Nalchik	
	2013–	Flag of Namsky	
	2001–	Flag of Naryan-Mar	
	201?–	Flag of Navashino	
	2016–	Flag of Nazran	
	2006–	Flag of Nizhny Novgorod	A bright red deer on a white background.
	2006–	Flag of Nizhny Tagil	The coat of arms of Nizhny Tagil on a maroon background.
	?–	Flag of Nolinsk	A swan on a blue background
	2000–	Flag of Norilsk	A polar bear holding a key on a vertically divided blue and red background.
	2018–	Flag of Novokuznetsk	
	2007–	Flag of Novorossiysk	
	1993–	Flag of Novosibirsk	
	?–	Flag of Odessky District	
	2014–	Flag of Omsk	
	2012–	Flag of Orenburg	
	?–	Flag of Orsk	
	1998–	Flag of Oryol	The coat of arms of the city on a red background and a light blue stripe with the hammer and sickle in the canton
	2003–	Flag of Ozyorsk	
	2004–	Flag of Penza	A green background with a vertical gold stripe at the hoist which is one fifth of the length of the flag. On the green background there are three golden sheaves of wheat, barley, and millet.
	1998–	Flag of Perm	A bear carrying a book beneath a cross on an all red background.
	?–	Flag of Pervomaysk, Nizhny Novgorod Oblast	
	2015–	Flag of Petropavlovsk-Kamchatsky	
	2001–	Flag of Petrozavodsk	
	2010–	Flag of Pskov	A hand (presumably God) reaching from a cloud on a blue background. Under it is a leopard holding its hand up.
	1998–	Flag of Rostov-on-Don	
	2001–	Flag of Ryazan	A man holding a sword on an all yellow background with a crown in the canton.
	1992–	Flag of Saint Petersburg	An anchor and a hook crossing each other with a scepter in the intersection of the two, all on a red background.
	1998–	Flag of Salekhard	
	2015–	Flag of Samara	A coat of arms above the name of the city in front of a horizontal tricolour of red, white, and blue.
	2011–	Flag of Saransk	
	1997–	Flag of Saratov	A coat of arms in front of a horizontally divided blue and white background.
	2006–	Flag of Sergiyev Posad	The walls of a city with two axes floating above it on a blue background.
	2005–	Flag of Shchukino District	A blue band with a pike on top. On the bottom is a yellow background with a black atom.
	2001–	Flag of Smolensk	
	2006–	Flag of Sochi	
	?–	Flag of Sokolsky District, Nizhny Novgorod Oblast	
	2014–	Flag of Stavropol	
	2005–	Flag of Surgut	
	2004–	Flag of Suzdal	A bird wearing a crown on a horizontally divided blue and red background.
	2009–	Flag of Syktyvkar	
	2008–	Flag of Tambov	A blue background with a green border (presumably grass). In the center there is a beehive on top with three bees flying out (as if it were going in of on top), which resembles the coat of arms of Tambov.
	2007–	Flag of Tobolsk	
	2005–	Flag of Tolyatti	
	2019–	Flag of Tomsk	A rearing horse on a dark green background.
	2001–	Flag of Tula	
	1999–	Flag of Tver	
	2008–	Flag of Tyumen	
	2007–	Flag of Ufa	
	2005–	Flag of Ulan-Ude	
	2003–	Flag of Ulyanovsk	A vertical triband of blue, white, and blue, with a golden crown in the middle of the white stripe.
	2010–	Flag of Veliky Novgorod	
	2015–	Flag of Veydelevsky District	
	1996–	Flag of Vladimir	A lion holding a cross and wearing a crown on a red background.
	2016–	Flag of Vladivostok	The coat of arms of the city in front of a blue saltire on a red background.
	1999–	Flag of Volgograd	The coat of arms of the city on a red background.
	2003–	Flag of Vologda	God reaching out from the clouds holding a sword and cruciger on a red background.
	2008–	Flag of Voronezh	
	?–	Flag of Vyksa	
	?–	Flag of Yakovlevsky District	Two blue swords, one facing left and one facing right, is under a pile of blue rocks all on a white background.
	1996–	Flag of Yakutsk	
	1996–	Flag of Yaroslavl	The arms of the city on a blue background.
	2008–	Flag of Yekaterinburg	A furnace and well on a horizontally divided green, yellow and blue background.
	2011–	Flag of Yoshkar-Ola	
	2004–	Flag of Yurga	A black rearing horse inside a yellow flame on a blue background.
	2005–	Flag of Yuzhno-Sakhalinsk	The white outlined coat of arms of the city on a blue background, and on the bottom is two waves.
	2000–	Flag of Zlatoust	A yellow pegasus above a yellow stripe on a red background.
	1998–	Flag of Zvyozdny, Perm Krai	

== Political flags ==
Flag	Date	Use	Description
Current
	2001–	Flag of United Russia	
	1993–	Flag of the Communist Party of the Russian Federation	
	2006–	Flag of A Just Russia	
	1992–	Flag of the Liberal Democratic Party of Russia	
	2012–	Flag of Rodina	
	1993–	Flag of Yabloko	
	1992–	Flag of the Russian Ecological Party "The Greens"	
	2012–	Flag of the Democratic Party of Russia	
	2009–	Flag of the Communists of Russia	
	2001–	Flag of the Russian Communist Workers' Party of the Communist Party of the Soviet Union	
	2012–	Flag of the Monarchist Party of Russia	
Regional
	2005–	Flag of Donetsk Republic	
	2014–	Flag of Free Donbas	
	2014–	Flag of the New Russia Party	
	1988–	Flag of Adyghe Hase	
	1993–2005	Flag of the Baltic Republican Party	
Link to file	1993–2005	Flag of the Baltic Republican Party	
	1917–1918, 1989–	Flag of Mari Ushem	
Former
Link to file	1991–2001	Flag of the Russian Communist Workers Party	
Link to file	1998–2011	Flag of the Stalin Bloc – For the USSR	
	2004–2012	Flag of the Pyotr Alexeyev Resistance Movement	
Link to file	2004–2009	Flag of the All-Russian Communist Party of the Future	
Link to file	2010–2022	Flag of the Russian Labour Front	
	2008–2019	Flag of the Interprofessional Workers' Union	
	1988–1995	Flag of the Confederation of Anarcho-Syndicalists	
	1993–2019	Flag of the Agrarian Party of Russia	
Link to file	2005–2014	Flag of the Patriots of Russia	
	2014–2021	Flag of the Patriots of Russia	
	2004–2006	Flag of Our Choice	
Link to file	2006–2012	Flag of the Russian People's Democratic Union	
	1995–2006	Flag of Our Home – Russia	
	1999–2008	Flag of the Union of Right Forces	
Link to file	2003–2003	Flag of the New Course — Automobile Russia	
	2013–2025	Flag of Civic Initiative	
	2013–2020	Flag of the Great Fatherland Party	
	2001–2007	Flag of the People's Union	
	2007–2008	Flag of the People's Union	
	1991–2025	Flag of the Russian All-People's Union	
	1980–2021	Flag of Pamyat	
	1990–2000	Flag of Russian National Unity	
	2000–2013	Flag of Russian National Unity (2000)	
	1990–2011	Flag of the Russian All-National Union	
	1991–1999	Flag of Front of National Revolutionary Action	
	1994–1997	Flag of the National Socialist Russian Workers' Party	
	1993–1999	Flag of the Russian National Union	
	1999–2007	Flag of the Russian National Socialist Party	
	1994–2009	Flag of the People's National Party	
	1999–2010	Flag of the Slavic Union	
	2002–2011	Flag of the Movement Against Illegal Immigration	
	2004–2010	Flag of the National Socialist Society	
	2011–2015	Flag of Russians (organization)	
	2014–2020	Flag of the Nation and Freedom Committee	
	2016–2020	Flag of the Male State	
Link to file	1992–1994	Flag of the National Salvation Front	
	1993–2007	Flag of the National Bolshevik Party	
Link to file	1996–2008	Flag of the Party of Peace and Unity	
	1997–2011	Flag of the People's Will Army	
	2011–2015	Flag of For Responsible Government	
	2003–2006	Flag of Rodina (political bloc)	
Link to file	2006–2016	Flag of the National Bolshevik Front	

== See also ==
- Flags of the federal subjects of Russia
  - List of Sakha flags
- Flags used in Russian-occupied Ukraine
