= Flag of the Sakha Republic =

Flag of republic within Russian Federation

Republic of Sakha (Yakutia)
- Proportion: 1:2
- Adopted: 14 October 1992
- Design: Horizontal light blue, white, red and green stripes with a white circle on a blue stripe.
- Designed by: Danilova Lyudmila, Mikhail Starostin, and Ayina Zakharova
- Flag of the Yakut SSR, then the Sakha Republic (1990–1992)
- Proportion: 1:2
- Adopted: 27 September 1990
- Design: Variant of the Russian SFSR flag with "Yakutskaya-Sakha SSR" written in the Russian-Yakut languages respectively below the hammer and sickle.

The state flag of the Sakha Republic (Yakutia) (Note: Yakut: Саха Өрөспүүбүлүкэтин былааҕа, romanized: Saxa Öröspüübülüketin bılaağa; Russian: Флаг Республики Саха (Якутия)) in Russia is one of the official symbols of the Sakha Republic, alongside the coat of arms and the national anthem of the Sakha Republic. The flag has four horizontal stripes. From top to bottom, the stripes are light blue (3/4 of the flag's width), white (1/16), red (1/16), and green (1/8). The flag has been used officially as the flag of the Sakha Republic since 14 October 1992. The light blue stripe is charged with a white disc in the center. The diameter of the disc is 1/5 of the flag's width.

In the Soviet era and prior to the 1991 declaration of the Sakha Republic within the Russian Federation was the Yakut Autonomous Soviet Socialist Republic. Prior to 1937, the Yakut ASSR used a flag with a blue canton containing the depiction of the Aurora and the name of the ASSR. After 1937, the flag of the Yakut ASSR was based on the flag of the Russian SFSR, modified with inscriptions.

== Symbolism ==
The disc represents the northern sun. The light blue, white, and green colors stand for the sky, snow, and taiga landscape respectively. The red symbolizes the courage and constancy of the people. According to the constitution of the Sakha Republic, the white disc represents the white sun of the arctic sky while the combination of light blue, white and red represent Sakha's place in the Russian Federation.

== Legislation ==
The current law regulating the design and use of the flag was passed on 15 July 2004. The third chapter of Law No. 313-III "On the Official Symbols of the Sakha (Yakut) Republic" describes the symbolism, usage, placement, and the custom of flying the flag of the Sakha Republic alongside other flags.

== History ==
=== Revolt flags ===
After the civil war, there were several revolts in the Yakut region.

- The Tungus Revolt, which established the Tungus Republic, uses a white-green-black tricolor. The white color of the flag symbolized the Siberian snow, green symbolizes wood and taiga, and black symbolizes the ground. The flag is identical to the flag of the Ural Republic.
Flag of the Tungus Revolt

=== As the Yakut ASSR ===
The first flag of the Yakut ASSR was described in the 1926 Constitution of the Yakut ASSR, which was approved on the 4th All-Yakutsk Congress of Soviets on 13 February 1926, and was introduced by resolution of the 2nd session of the Yakut Central Executive Committee on the 4th convocation of 17 September 1926. The flag was a red flag, with a blue canton in the top left of the flag on which the northern lights was depicted with the inscription in golden letters "ЯАССР" in the Yakut language.

The flag of the Yakut ASSR was described in the 1937 Constitution of the Yakut ASSR, which was adopted by the Central Executive Committee of the Yakut ASSR on 9 March 1937, at the 9th Extraordinary Congress of Soviets of the Yakut ASSR. The flag became that of the Russian SFSR save for an added inscription naming the Yakut ASSR. These inscriptions were modified after a new alphabet for the Yakut language was approved by a decree of the People's Commissar of Education of the Soviet Union.

A new state flag of the Yakut ASSR was adopted on 12 June 1954, by the decree of the Presidium of the Supreme Council of the Yakut ASSR "On the State Flag of the Yakut Autonomous Soviet Socialist Republic", and the official design of the flag was approved by the Law of the Yakut ASSR of 23 June 1954. The new state flag was based on the state flag of the Russian SFSR, with the added inscription of the ASSR name. The position of the inscriptions changed after the adoption of the new constitution of the Yakut ASSR on 31 May 1978.

13 February 1926 – 9 March 1937

9 March 1937 – 23 March 1939

23 March 1939 – 12 June 1954

12 June 1954 – 27 October 1978

27 October 1978 – 27 September 1990

27 September 1990 – 14 October 1992

=== As the Sakha (Yakut) Republic ===
In line with the dissolution of the Soviet Union and the formation of new national entities, the Sakha Republic adopted a new constitution on 4 April 1992. There weren't any statements regarding the detail of the flag of the Sakha Republic on the constitution. The only statement was:

The Republic of Sakha (Yakutia) has the State Emblem, the National Flag and the National Anthem.

— Constitution of the Sakha Republic (1992), Article 140

The flag of the Republic of Sakha itself was approved on 14 October 1992, by the Decree No.1158-XII, and the decree itself was adopted by the Decree No.1159-XII. At 17.50 on the same day, the flag was first hoisted over the building of the Supreme Council of the Sakha Republic, next to the flag of the Russian Federation.

The description of the flag was approved and the description of the flag was inserted into the Constitution of the Sakha Republic by the amendments of 22 July 2008.

The national flag of the Republic of Sakha (Yakutia) is a rectangular panel consisting of four differently sized horizontal stripes of blue, white, red, and green, respectively. The ratio of the width of the stripes to the width of the flag: blue stripes – 3/4 of the flag's width, white stripes – 1/16 of the flag's width, red stripes – 1/16 of the flag's width, green stripes – 1/8 of the flag's width.
In the middle of the blue strip, there is a white circle. The diameter of the circle is 2/5 of the width of the flag. The ratio of the width of the flag to its length is 1:2.

— Constitution of the Sakha Republic (1992, amended 2008), Article 47.3

14 October 1992 –

Standard of the Head of the Sakha Republic

Flag of the Association of Evenks in Yakutia

== Designers ==
- Lyudmila, Danilova Sleptsova (born 1942). Painter, Honored Artist of the Sakha Republic. Member of the Union of Artists of the Russian Federation.
- Starostin, Mikhail Gavrilovich (born 1959). Graphic designer. Member of the Union of Artists of the Russian Federation.
- Zakharova, Ayina Petrovna (born 1973). Painter, student of the Artist School of Yakutia.

== See also ==
- List of Sakha flags
