= Kyym =

Кыым
- Founded: 1921
- Language: Yakut
- Headquarters: ul. Ordozhonikidze 31, Yakutsk, Sakha Republic
- Circulation: c. 18.000 (2007)
- Website: www.kyym.ru

Kyym (Yakut: Кыым, lit. Spark) is the main Yakut language newspaper, published in Yakutsk five times a week. Owned by LLC "Media Group "Sitim", the current editor-in-chief is Ivan Ivanovich Gavrilyev. The print edition is published once a week on Thursdays and consists of 48 pages in an A3 format. It also operates an online version.

== History of the newspaper ==
The first newspaper in the Yakut language was Manchaary, the first issue of which was published on 28 December 1921. Two years later, a commission of three people — the People's Commissar of the Interior Stepan Arzhakova (Аржаков, Степан Максимович), Commissar of Education Ilya Vinokurov (Винокуров, Илья Егорович) and member of the board of Kholbos M. Popov - decided to make the newspaper periodical and give it a new name - Kyym (kɯ:m in Novgorodov's Alphabet and Kььm in Yañalif forms). The first publishers of the newspaper were Platon Oyunsky, Maksim Ammosov, Anempodist Sofronov (Алампа).

In 1993, after the October events, the publication was closed. In 1994, the newspaper was published by a journalist Fedora Petrovna Egorova (Егорова, Федора Петровна), who has been at the newspaper's office for 36 years.
