= Yakut scripts =

Scripts used to write the Yakut language

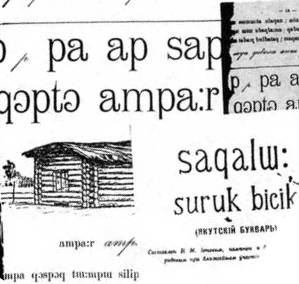
A fragment of suruk bicik

There are 4 stages in the history of Yakut writing systems:

- until the early 1920s – ad hoc Cyrillic alphabet;
- 1917–1929 – Novgorodov's Latin alphabet;
- 1929–1939 – the unified Yañalif Latin alphabet;
- since 1939 – a Yakut Cyrillic alphabet.

== Early Cyrillic ==
At the end of the XVII century records of Yakut words were made, and in the 19th century. A number of Cyrillic alphabets emerged. So, in the second edition of the book by Nicolaes Witsen’s “Noord en Oost Tartarye” (Northern and Eastern Tataria), with a translation of the prayer “Our Father” into the Yakut language and some of the Yakut vocabulary, written in an approximate transcription in Latin, was published in 1705.

The first real Yakut alphabet appeared in 1819 along with the translation of the "Сокращенный катехизис" (Abridged Catechism) published in Irkutsk. According to experts, "it was, on the whole, a primitive adaptation of the Russian alphabet for printing the Yakut text, which did not take into account the specifics of the Yakut language."

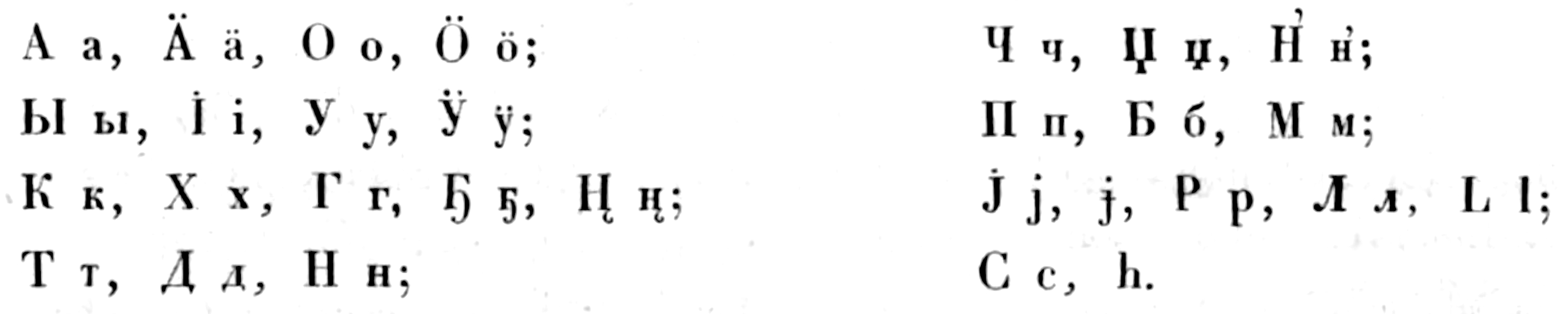
von Böhtlingk's 1851 alphabet

Almost half a century later, a new Yakut alphabet developed by academician Otto von Böhtlingk and published in his famous work "Über die Sprache der Jakuten" appeared, in which all phonemes received their designation in 29 letters: А а, Ӓ ӓ, О о, Ӧ ӧ, І і, Ы ы, У у, Ӱ ӱ, К к, Х х, Г г, Ҕ ҕ, Ҥ ҥ, Т т, Д д, Н н, Ч ч, Џ џ, Нʼ нʼ, П п, Б б, М м, Ј ј, Ј̵ ј̵, Р р, Л л, L l, С с, Һ һ.

The scientist arranged the letters (mostly Russian) as in Sanskrit, i.e. vowels come first, then consonants, from guttural to aspirated. Consonant length is indicated by letter doubling, diphthongs by vowel combinations, and long vowels are indicated by a bar above the letter. Despite certain shortcomings, some socio-political literature, samples of folklore texts, etc. were published in this alphabet.

In 1858, D. V. Khitrov compiled a new alphabet of 29 letters: А а, Б б, Г г, Д д, Ԫ ԫ, Е е, Ё ё, И и, І і, Й й, К к, Л л, М м, Н н, Ҥ ҥ, О о, П п, Р р, С с, Т т, У у, Х х, Ч ч, Ы ы, Э э, Ю ю, Я я, ъ, ь. Vowel length was indicated by a macron over the letter.

However, the principle of "one sound – one letter" was not observed, and the same phoneme was indicated by several letters. Despite the imperfections of the alphabet, it was he who came to the taste of the ministers of the church, they used it for printing liturgical literature and teaching children in the seminary.

According to the Yakut linguist S. A. Novgorodov, the main drawback of the Bötlingk alphabet was an overabundance of superscript characters, which led to difficulties in writing and typographic typing. Khitrov's alphabet was poorly adapted to the phonetics of the Yakut language and "was adapted to the Russian reader".

== Novgorodov's alphabet ==
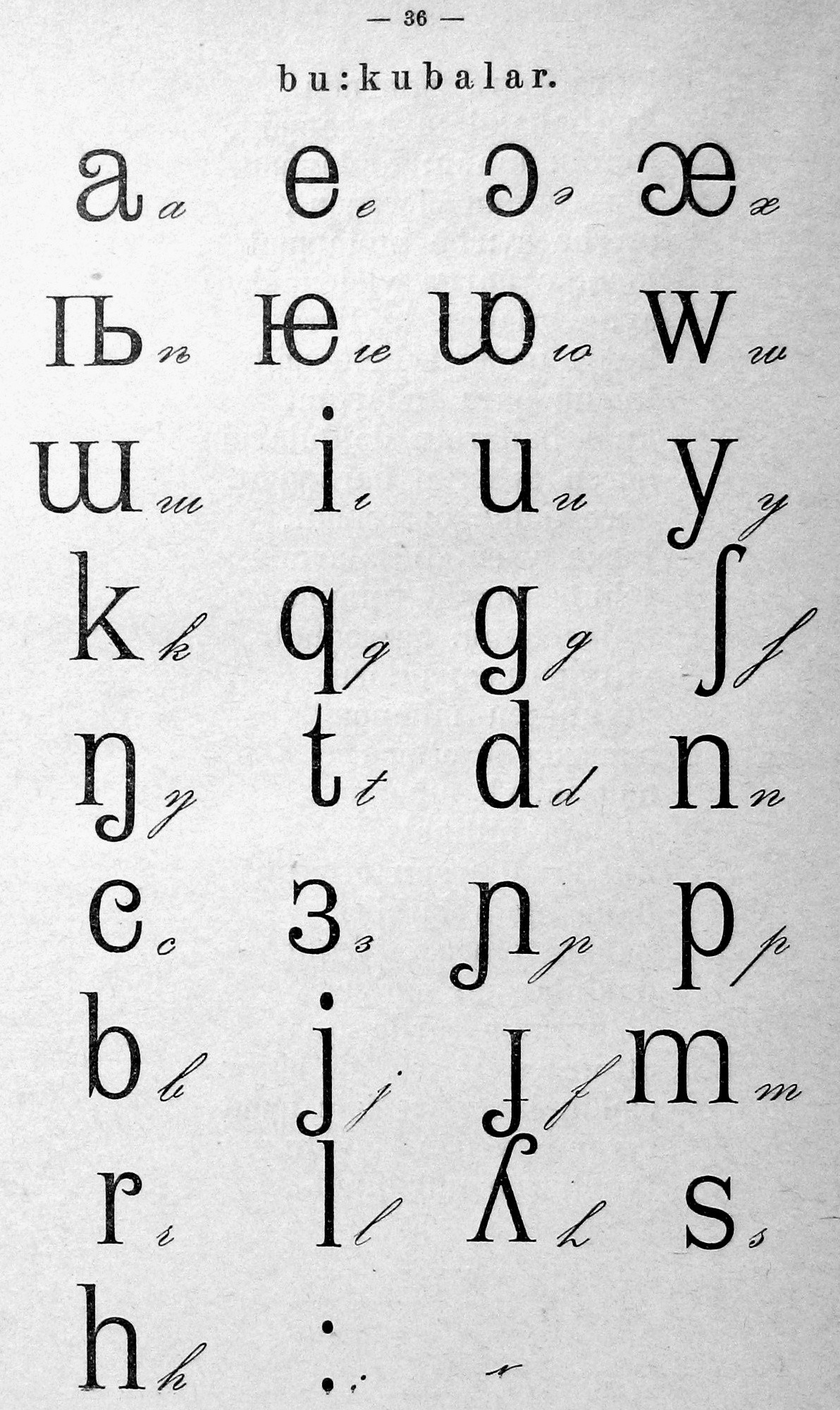
Novgorodov's alphabet from the primer of 1929

In 1917, a Yakut student at Petrograd University, S. A. Novgorodov, compiled the Yakut alphabet based on the International Phonetic Alphabet. In the summer of the same year, the Yakut national and public organizations discussed the Novgorodov alphabet and spoke positively about it. Soon, the first primer was published in this alphabet, but since there were no necessary fonts in Yakutsk, the alphabet of the primer had to be changed based on the technical capabilities of the printing house. The alphabet of this edition included the following letters: a, b, c, d, e, g, ʁ, h, i, ie, j, ɟ, k, l, ʎ, m, n, ng, nj, ɔ, oe, p, q, r, s, t, ɯ, ɯa, u, uo, w, y, з.

The correct Novgorodov alphabet, as seen at left, consists of 33 letters and the length sign:

a e ɔ ꭢ ꭠ ꭡ ꭣ w ɯ i u y k q g ʃ ŋ t d n c ɜ ɲ p b j ɟ m r l ʎ s h ꞉

Among these are ligatures for diphthongs, namely ⟨ꭠ⟩ /ɯ͡a/, ⟨ꭡ⟩ /i͡e/, ⟨ꭣ⟩ /u͡o/ and ⟨w⟩ /y͡ø/, and did not have any diacritics and capital letters. The length of vowels was indicated by a colon after the letters. The publication of the first Yakut primers, books for reading, school textbooks and grammar, as well as scientific, pedagogical and fiction literature began on this alphabet. The new script was used in the mass education of children at school.

In the 1920/21 academic year, this alphabet was officially introduced into school teaching, and the Yakut-language newspaper Manchaary was translated into it. In 1923, fonts were made for the "original" version of the Novgorodov alphabet, and book publishing was transferred to a new font. At the same time, a number of Yakut scientists and writers (in particular, Aleksey Kulakovskiy) advocated the abolition of this alphabet and the introduction of writing based on the Cyrillic alphabet.

In 1924, a broad discussion took place on the improvement of the Novgorodov alphabet. Among its shortcomings were the lack of capitalization and punctuation; the presence of special characters for diphthongs, complicating the alphabet; graphic monotony of the text (for example – sɯmɯ꞉t, ɯmɯ꞉). As a result, the Yakut Writing Council decided to introduce capital letters and punctuation marks into the alphabet, as well as change the style of a number of characters. However, due to the lack of fonts, it was not possible to transfer the publishing business to a new version of the alphabet.

In 1925, the inscription of three more characters was replaced in the alphabet. However, by this time a campaign had begun for the creation of a unified Turkic alphabet, and the order for new fonts was suspended. As a result of the changes in 1924 and 1925, in practice, only the handwritten text was affected, and the printed text was typed in the 1923 font. This situation continued until 1929.

== New Turkic alphabet ==
After 1929, Novgorodov's alphabet was replaced by a form of Latin script based on the Yanalif. During the period of the cultural revolution, which required the maximum use of native languages, and, consequently, the exceptional flexibility of writing, the question was raised of unifying the Yakut alphabet with the "New Turkic alphabet" (Yanalif). The Committee of the Yakut Writing, created by the government, was instructed to study the issue of the new Yakut alphabet in all its aspects.

The Yakut Writing Committee set itself two tasks: 1) to unify the Yakut Latinized (Novgorod) alphabet with the Yanalif and 2) to put it into practice as soon as possible. The Committee outlined ways to resolve controversial issues. Thus the following was accepted and sanctioned:

- Unconditionally recognize as unified those letters of the Yakut alphabet that were the same both in pronunciation and in style with the letters Yanalif (there were only 20 of them);
- Leave in the alphabet those specific consonants that were in the Yakut language, but were absent in the Yanalif. In the opinion of the committee, these letters could not be replaced in print and writing by the letters Yanalif;
- Leave in the alphabet specific designations of diphthong letters that were absent in the Yanalif (there were four of them) and which reflected the features of the Yakut language.
- Leave in the Yakut alphabet the outlines of those Yakut letters that were identical in pronunciation with the letters Yanalif, but differed significantly in outline. Instead of these letters, the Committee proposed the styles adopted in the Yakut alphabet before 1917, which were free from unnecessary diacritical marks and were convenient in printing and writing.
- Enter capital letters and punctuation marks that were not accepted when the Novgorod's alphabet was introduced in 1917.

Quite specifically, the committee raised the question of designating long vowels.

The final decision on the issue was made by the Yakut Central Executive Committee only on May 9, 1929. The adopted government decree stated that only complete unification would put a limit to the fluctuations to which the alphabet is subject and which slow down the introduction and development of the Yakut writing.

Yakut alphabet 1929–1939:

A a	B ʙ	C c	Ç ç	D d	E e	G g	Ƣ ƣ	H h	I i
J j	K k	L l	Lj lj	M m	N n	Nj nj	Ꞑ ꞑ	O o	Ө ө
	P p	Q q	R r	S s	T t	U u	Y y	Ь ь

Long vowels in this alphabet were indicated by doubling a letter, and diphthongs by a combination of two letters.

In 1936, a draft of a new reform of the Yakut alphabet was developed. According to the project, the alphabet was to include letters: A a, B в, C c, Ç ç, D d, E e, F f, G g, H h, I i, J j, K k, L l,, M m, N n, Ŋ ŋ, Ꞑ ꞑ, O o, P p, Q q, Ƣ ƣ, R r, S s, Ş ş, T t, U u, V v, Y y, З з, Ƶ ƶ, Ь ь, Ө ө. Long vowels were proposed to be denoted by a macron. However, this project was never implemented.

== Modern alphabet ==
In the second half of the 1930s, the process of translating the writings of the peoples of the USSR into Cyrillic began. In 1938, preparations began for the creation of the Yakut Cyrillic alphabet. Employees of the Yakut Research Institute of Language and Culture, as well as scientists from Leningrad, took part in the development of the project. On March 23, 1939, by decree of the People's Commissar of Education of the USSR, the new Yakut alphabet was approved.

Today, the Yakut language uses an alphabet based on the Cyrillic alphabet, which contains the entire Russian alphabet, plus five additional letters: Ҕҕ, Ҥҥ, Өө, Һһ, Үү and two digraphs: Дь дь, Нь нь. 4 diphthongs are also used: уо, ыа, иэ, үө (not included in the alphabet).

А а	Б б	В в	Г г	Ҕ ҕ	Д д	Дь дь	Е е	Ё ё	Ж ж
З з	И и	Й й	К к	Л л	М м	Н н	Ҥ ҥ	Нь нь	О о
Ө ө	П п	Р р	С с	Һ һ	Т т	У у	Ү ү	Ф ф	Х х
Ц ц	Ч ч	Ш ш	Щ щ	Ъ ъ	Ы ы	Ь ь	Э э	Ю ю	Я я

== Correspondence chart ==
Table of alphabets used to write Yakut with approximate dates of use
IPA	1819–1858	1851–1917 (Böhtlingk Alphabet)	1858–1917 (D. V. Khitrov Alphabet)	1917–1929 (Novgorodov Alphabet)	1929–1939 (Yañalif)	1939–Present	Notes
a	Аа	Аа	Аа	a	Aa	Аа	
b	Бб	Бб	Бб	b	Bʙ	Бб	
v	Вв	–	–	–	–	Вв	found only in Russian loanwords
ɡ	Гг	Гг	Гг	g	Gg	Гг	
ɣ, ʁ	–	Ҕҕ	–	ʃ	Ƣƣ	Ҕҕ	
d	Дд	Дд	Дд	d	Dd	Дд	
ɟ	–	Џџ	Ԫԫ	з	Çç	Дьдь	
e, je	Ее	–	Ее	–	–	Ее	found only in Russian loanwords
jo	–	–	–	–	–	Ёё	found only in Russian loanwords
ʒ	Жж	–	–	–	–	Жж	found only in Russian loanwords
z	Зз	–	–	–	–	Зз	found only in Russian loanwords
i	Ии,Іі	Іі	Ии	i	Ii	Ии	
j	–	Јј	Йй	j	Jj	Йй	
ȷ̃	–	Ј̵ј̵	–	ɟ	–	–	
k	Кк	Кк	Кк	k	Kk	Кк	
l	Лл	Лл	Лл	l	Ll	Лл	
ʎ	–	Ll	–	ʎ	Lj lj	–	
m	Мм	Мм	Мм	m	Mm	Мм	
n	Нн	Нн	Нн	n	Nn	Нн	
ŋ	–	Ңң	Ҥҥ	ŋ	Ꞑꞑ	Ҥҥ	
ɲ	–	Нʼнʼ	–	ɲ	Njnj	Ньнь	
o	Оо	Оо	Оо	ɔ	Oo	Оо	
ø	–	Ӧӧ	Ёё	ꭢ	Ɵɵ	Өө	
p	Пп	Пп	Пп	p	Pp	Пп	
r	Рр	Рр	Рр	r	Rr	Рр	
s	Сс	Сс	Сс	s	Ss	Сс	
h	–	һ	–	h	Hh	Һһ	
t	Тт	Тт	Тт	t	Tt	Тт	
u	Уу	Уу	Уу	u	Uu	Уу	
y	–	Ӱӱ	–	y	Yy	Үү	
f	Фф, Ѳѳ	–	–	–	–	Фф	found only in Russian loanwords
x	Хх	Хх	Хх	q	Qq	Хх	
ts	Цц	–	–	–	–	Цц	found only in Russian loanwords
tʃ	Чч	Чч	Чч	c	Cc	Чч	
ʃ	Шш	–	–	–	–	Шш	found only in Russian loanwords
ɕː	Щщ	–	–	–	–	Щщ	found only in Russian loanwords
◌.	Ъъ	Ъъ	–	–	–	Ъъ	found only in Russian loanwords
ɯ	Ыы	Ыы	Ыы	ɯ	Ьь	Ыы	
◌ʲ	Ьь	Ьь	–	–	–	Ьь	found only in digraphs (дь, нь) and Russian loanwords
e	Ее	Ӓӓ	Ээ	e	Ee	Ээ	
ju	Юю	Юю	–	–	–	Юю	found only in Russian loanwords
ja	Яя	Яя	–	–	–	Яя	found only in Russian loanwords

== Notes ==
=== Sources ===
In Russian

- Исаев, М. И. (1979). "Создание якутской письменности на латинской графической основе". In Баскаков, Н. А. (ed.). Языковое строительство в СССР (процессы создания письменностей народов СССР). Москва: Наука. pp. 101–105.
