= Tungus Republic =

Historical sovereign state in present-day Russia

Provisional Tungus Central National Government Временное Центральное Тунгусское Национальное Управление Быстах Киин Тоҥ уус Национальнай Дьаһалта
- 1924–1925
- Flag
- Anthem: "Саргылардаах сахаларбыт" "Sakha, Covered in Happiness"
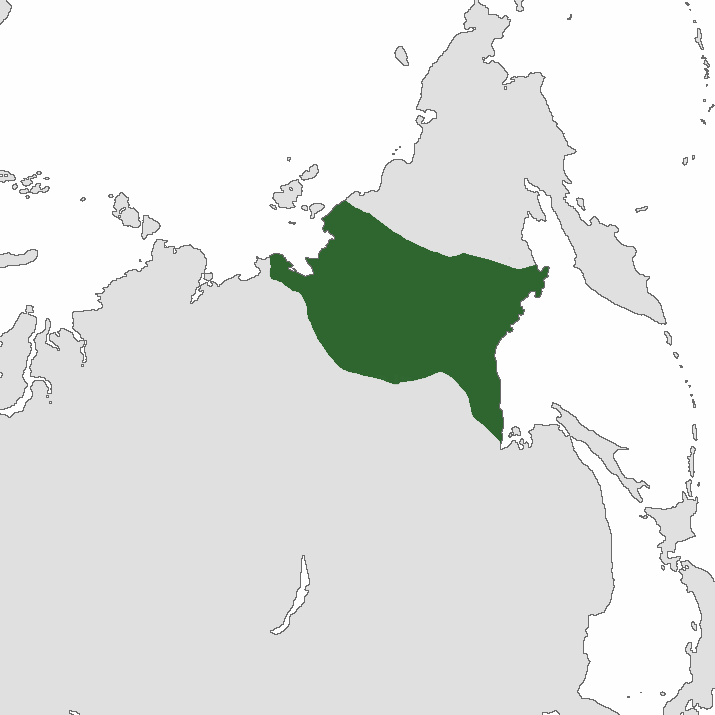
- Capital: Ayan
- History
  - Capture of Ayan: 10 May 1924
  - Proclamation: 14 July 1924
  - Disestablished: 9 May 1925

Area
  - Estimate: 100,000 km^{2} (39,000 sq mi)

Population
  - Estimate: ~13,000
Preceded by	Succeeded by
Soviet Union	Soviet Union
- Today part of: Russia

The Provisional Tungus Central National Government (PT-CNG; Russian: Временное Центральное Тунгусское Национальное Управление, romanized: Vremennoye Tsentral'noye Tungusskoye Natsional'noye Upravleniye; Yakut: Быстах Киин Тоҥ уус Национальнай Дьаһалта, romanized: Bıstax Kiin Toñ uus Natsionalnay Cahalta), more commonly known as the Tungus Republic (Russian: Тунгусская республика, romanized: Tungusskaya Respublika; Yakut: Тоҥ уус Өрөспүүбүлүкэтэ, romanized: Toñ uus Öröspüübülükete; Evenki: Эведы̄ Республика, romanized: Ewedȳ Respublika) was a short-lived unrecognized secessionist state covering mostly Okhotsk region and the eastern regions of the Yakut ASSR from July 1924 to May 1925.

== Background ==
In April 1922, the Okhotsk region was separated from the Yakut ASSR and was transferred to the Primorsky and Kamchatka krai. As a result, while a new military-political line was pursued in Yakutia under the conditions of the New Economic Policy, on the Okhotsk coast the local party-Soviet leadership and organs of the OGPU continued to pursue a policy of terror against the population of the “war communism” era. Chekists swept away Tungus yurts with artillery fire, where women, children, and old men were hiding; machine-gun fire drowned bark boats with peaceful hunters and fishermen. The native populations were set exorbitant "taxes" for almost everything: for feather, weapons, firewood, dogs, peeled bark of trees, etc. It came to the point that they began to take the old debts established by the White Guards in 1919–1923. The representatives of the Soviet government did not know the Tungus customs and culture. There were no national schools, there was a native representative in the composition of the co-institution, the prosecutor's office, and there weren't enough translators for the Soviet representatives.

== Formation ==
On May 10, 1924, the rebels under the leadership of Mikhail Artemyev occupied the town of Nelkan. Captured Soviet workers A.V. Yakulovsky, F.F.Popov, Koryakin were released into the wild. On June 6, the rebels numbering 60 people under the leadership of the Tungus P. Karamzin and the Yakut MK Artemyev seized the port of Ayan after an 18-hour battle. During the battle, the head of the OGPU, Suvorov and three Red Army soldiers were killed, and the surrendered garrison was liberated by the Tungus and sent to Yakutia.

In Nelkan, Artemyev convened a congress of the Ajano-Nelkan, Okhotsk-Ayan, Maymakan Tunguses and Yakuts in June. The congress elected the Provisional Central Tungus National Government, which decided to secede from Soviet Russia and form an independent state. Artemyev was elected chief of staff of the armed detachments, and the leader of all detachments was the Tungus P. Karamzin.

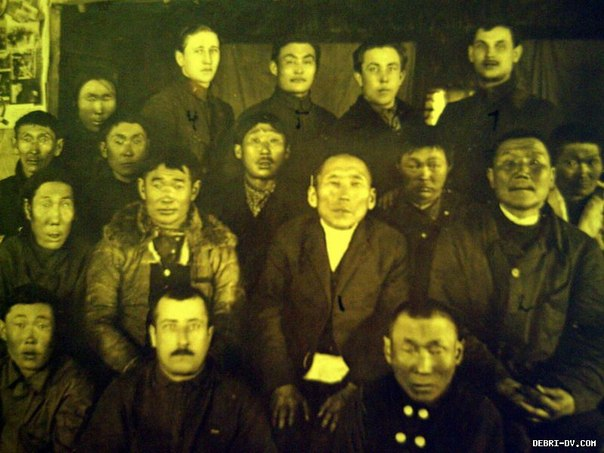
Delegates of the Tungus Gathering.

On July 14, 1924, Tungus independence was declared at Ayan at the "All-Tungus Congress of the Okhotsk coast and the surroundings", for the Tungus people and the inviolability of its territory, sea, forest, mountain riches and resources. The leaders of the movement of different nationalities : Artemyev, P. Karamzin, S. Kanin, I. Koshelev, G. Y. Fedorov and others, a total of 10 people, made up an appeal to the world community. It dealt with the fact that backward “in all respects from the world progress of science and technology” the Tungus Republic appealed to foreign states and the League of Nations, “as powerful defenders of small nationalities on a global scale” on the issue of saving them from the “common enemy of the world nationalism - Russian communism ”. Such a statement of the problem by the leadership of the movement indicates a fairly mature level of political self-awareness and socio-political views.

== National Symbols ==
=== Flag ===
Tungus Republic
- Use: National flag and ensign
- Proportion: 2:3
- Adopted: 1924–1925
- Design: A horizontal triband of white, green and black

The All-Tungus Congress adopted a tricolour as the flag of the Tungus Republic. The white colour of the flag symbolized the Siberian snow, green symbolized wood and taiga, and black symbolized the ground. The ratio of the flag would be 2:3.

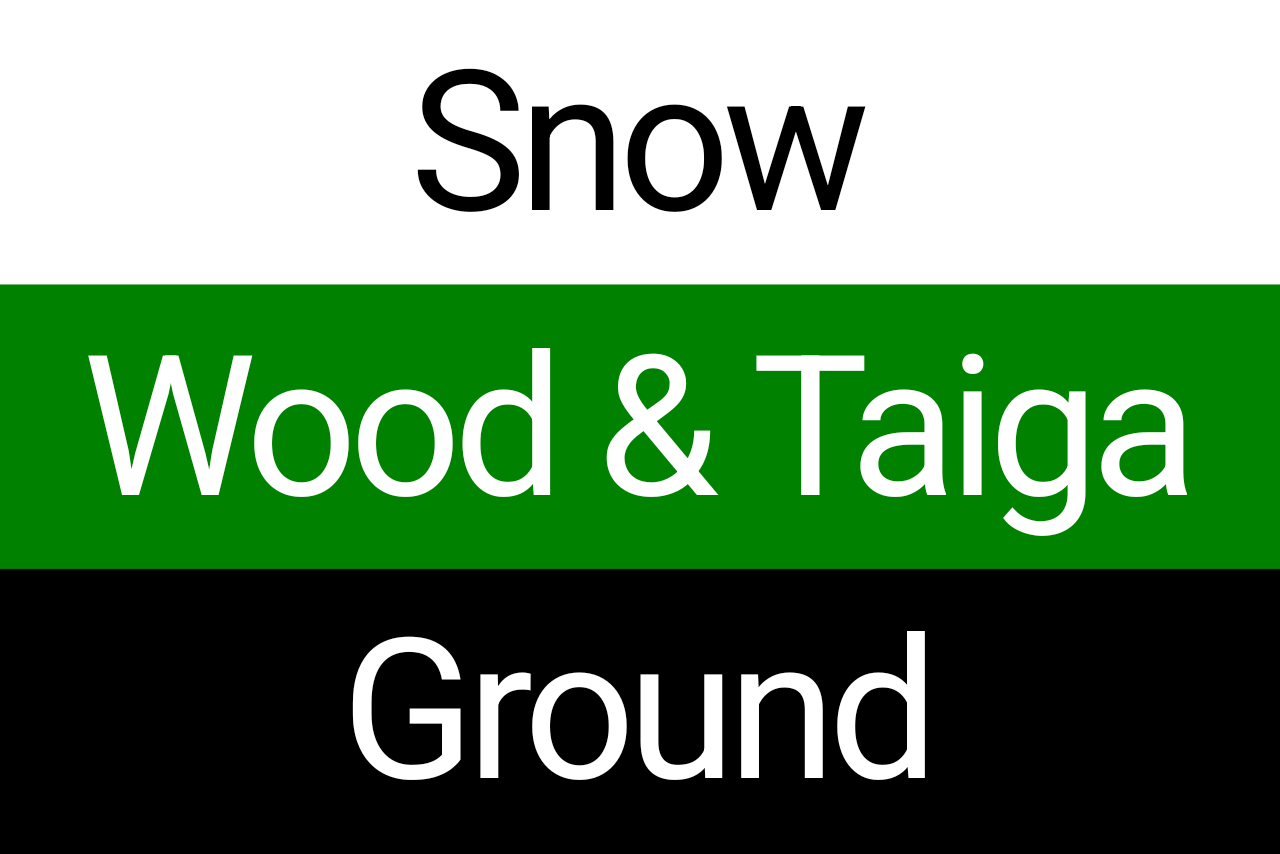
Text explaining the symbolism of the colours on the flag of the Tungus Republic

=== Anthem ===
The song "Sargılardaaq saqalarbıt" (Саргылардаах сахаларбыт; Russian: Овеянный счастьем якут; "Sakha, Covered in Happiness") was adopted as the anthem of the Tungus Republic. The anthem itself was composed by Adam Skriabin, and the lyrics of the song were based on the poem "Iççat saqalarga" (Ыччат сахаларга; "We are Proud Sakhas") by Anempodist Sofronov, who was also known by his pseudonym "Alampa". The poem itself was written in 1917.

Yakut (Latin)

Sargylardaax saxalarbyt salahynnaax sańalaryn.

Sańalyyra toiugunan salaian-sańardan ihieğiń.

Ytyk-kyrçağas çonnorbut yllaabyt yryalaryn.

Yllam-çellem yryanan yllaan-tuoian ihieğiń.

Urukkuluur uçuordarbyt uruidaabyt oloxtorun.

Umnubakka sylçammyt, uhatan-keńeten ihieğiń.

Törüt törötön aiyllybyt ele-byla tyllary.

Irdeen-tordoon turammyt, uhatan-keńeten ihieğiń.

Kihi - saxa aatyrbyt keries-xomuruos tyllary.

Kiceien-xacaian turammyt, keńeten sańaran ihieğiń.

Urukkuluur uçuordarbyt uruidaabyt oloxtorun.

Umnubakka sylçammyt, uhatan-keńeten ihieğiń. (×2)

Uhatan-keńeten ihieğiń!

Yakut (Cyrillic)

Саргылардаах сахаларбыт салаһыннаах саңаларын.

Саңалыыра тойугунан салайан-саңардан иһиэҕиҥ.

Ытык-кырдьаҕас дьоннорбут ыллаабыт ырыаларын.

Ыллам-дьэллэм ырыанан ыллаан-туойан иһиэҕиҥ.

Уруккулуур удьуордарбыт уруйдаабыт олохторун.

Умнубакка сылдьаммыт, уһатан-кэңэтэн иһиэҕиҥ.

Төрүт төрөтөн айыллыбыт элэ-была тыллары.

Ирдээн-тордоон тураммыт, уһатан-кэңэтэн иһиэҕиҥ.

Киһи – саха аатырбыт кэриэс-хомуруос тыллары.

Кичэйэн-хачайан тураммыт, кэҥэтэн саҥаран иһиэҕиҥ.

Уруккулуур удьуордарбыт уруйдаабыт олохторун.

Умнубакка сылдьаммыт, уһатан-кэңэтэн иһиэҕиҥ. (×2)

Уһатан-кэңэтэн иһиэҕиҥ!

English

Let the benevolent voices of the proud Sakhas.

Be risen and renewed, while being sung.

Let the songs of our respected elders.

Be sung and performed as a clear and pure song.

Let the stories of our great ancestors.

Be added upon, while not being forgotten.

Let the native, sincere, ancient words.

Be added upon, while being learned by our people.

Let the cherished words of the great Sakhas.

Be told once again and added upon, being protected by our people.

Let the stories of our great ancestors.

Be added upon, while not being forgotten. (×2)

While not being forgotten!

== Dissolution ==
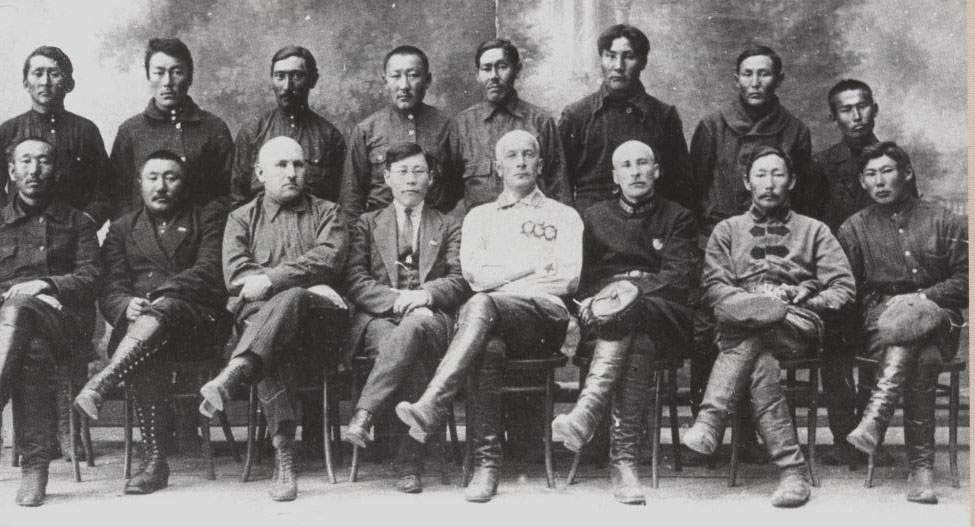
Members of the Council of People's Commissars of the Yakut ASSR with amnestied leaders of the 1925 rebels.

In May 1925, in the course of the peace negotiations between M.K. Artemyev and I.Y.Strod, R.F. Kulakovsky, both sides managed to find a meeting point. Artemyev was convinced that the leader of the Yakut ASSR did not carry out the policy of terror, that a national revival was being carried out in the republic, and that the question of the accession of the Tungus region to the Yakut ASSR was at the discussion stage. As a result of successful negotiations on May 9, a peace agreement was concluded and the detachment of M.K. Artemyev unanimously decided to lay down arms. On July 18, the detachment led by P. Karamzin in the Medvejya area, located 50 km from Okhotsk, joined the peaceful surrender. In total, 484 rebels from the Artemyev detachment and 35 rebels of Karamzin detachment laid down arms. Out of the 484 rebels in the Artemyev detachment, there were 315 Yakuts, 85 Tunguses, 46 Russians, 3 Tatars, 2 Poles, one Kamchadal, one Korean and 14 persons of unknown nationality.

== See also ==
- Yakut revolt (1918)
- Yakut revolt (1921–23)
- Flag of the Sakha Republic
- Ural Republic (1993), adopted a similar tricolor flag
