= Yefremovo =

Yefremovo (Russian: Ефремово) is the name of several rural localities in Russia.

- Yefremovo, Arkhangelsk Oblast, a village in Ukhotsky Selsoviet of Kargopolsky District in Arkhangelsk Oblast
- Yefremovo, Lezhnevsky District, Ivanovo Oblast, a village in Lezhnevsky District of Ivanovo Oblast
- Yefremovo, Verkhnelandekhovsky District, Ivanovo Oblast, a village in Verkhnelandekhovsky District of Ivanovo Oblast
- Yefremovo, Kaluga Oblast, a village in Mosalsky District of Kaluga Oblast
- Yefremovo, Moscow Oblast, a village in Pyshlitskoye Rural Settlement of Shatursky District in Moscow Oblast
- Yefremovo, Nizhny Novgorod Oblast, a village in Pozdnyakovsky Selsoviet of Navashinsky District in Nizhny Novgorod Oblast
- Yefremovo, Chudovsky District, Novgorod Oblast, a village in Gruzinskoye Settlement of Chudovsky District in Novgorod Oblast
- Yefremovo, Moshenskoy District, Novgorod Oblast, a village in Dolgovskoye Settlement of Moshenskoy District in Novgorod Oblast
- Yefremovo, Oryol Oblast, a village in Topkovsky Selsoviet of Pokrovsky District in Oryol Oblast
- Yefremovo, Aristovsky Rural Okrug, Starozhilovsky District, Ryazan Oblast, a village in Aristovsky Rural Okrug of Starozhilovsky District in Ryazan Oblast
- Yefremovo, Gulynsky Rural Okrug, Starozhilovsky District, Ryazan Oblast, a village in Gulynsky Rural Okrug of Starozhilovsky District in Ryazan Oblast
- Yefremovo, Sakha Republic, a selo in Amgino-Nakharinsky Rural Okrug of Amginsky District in the Sakha Republic
- Yefremovo, Gagarinsky District, Smolensk Oblast, a village in Maltsevskoye Rural Settlement of Gagarinsky District in Smolensk Oblast
- Yefremovo, Rudnyansky District, Smolensk Oblast, a village in Lyubavichskoye Rural Settlement of Rudnyansky District in Smolensk Oblast
- Yefremovo, Kasnyanskoye Rural Settlement, Vyazemsky District, Smolensk Oblast, a village in Kasnyanskoye Rural Settlement of Vyazemsky District in Smolensk Oblast
- Yefremovo, Yefremovskoye Rural Settlement, Vyazemsky District, Smolensk Oblast, a village in Yefremovskoye Rural Settlement of Vyazemsky District in Smolensk Oblast
- Yefremovo, Penovsky District, Tver Oblast, a village in Runskoye Rural Settlement of Penovsky District in Tver Oblast
- Yefremovo, Rameshkovsky District, Tver Oblast, a village in Kiverichi Rural Settlement of Rameshkovsky District in Tver Oblast
- Yefremovo, Torzhoksky District, Tver Oblast, a village in Nikolskoye Rural Settlement of Torzhoksky District in Tver Oblast
- Yefremovo, Zapadnodvinsky District, Tver Oblast, a village in Zapadnodvinskoye Rural Settlement of Zapadnodvinsky District in Tver Oblast
- Yefremovo, Kezsky District, Udmurt Republic, a village in Yuskinsky Selsoviet of Kezsky District in the Udmurt Republic
- Yefremovo, Krasnogorsky District, Udmurt Republic, a village in Prokhorovsky Selsoviet of Krasnogorsky District in the Udmurt Republic
- Yefremovo, Vladimir Oblast, a village in Kirzhachsky District of Vladimir Oblast
- Yefremovo, Uglichsky District, Yaroslavl Oblast, a selo in Klementyevsky Rural Okrug of Uglichsky District in Yaroslavl Oblast
- Yefremovo, Bekrenevsky Rural Okrug, Yaroslavsky District, Yaroslavl Oblast, a village in Bekrenevsky Rural Okrug of Yaroslavsky District in Yaroslavl Oblast
- Yefremovo, Melenkovsky Rural Okrug, Yaroslavsky District, Yaroslavl Oblast, a village in Melenkovsky Rural Okrug of Yaroslavsky District in Yaroslavl Oblast

== See also ==
- Yefremov (disambiguation)
