= Yefremovo, Sakha Republic =

Yefremovo Ефремово
- Selo
- Interactive map of Yefremovo
- Location of Yefremovo Yefremovo (Sakha Republic)
- Coordinates: 60°28′N 131°09′E
- Country: Russia
- Federal subject: Sakha Republic
- Administrative district: Amginsky District
- Rural okrugSelsoviet: Amgino-Nakharinsky Rural Okrug

Population (2010 Census)
  - Total: 29
  - Estimate (2021): 4 (−86.2%)

Municipal status
  - Municipal district: Amginsky Municipal District
  - Rural settlement: Amgino-Nakharinsky Rural Settlement
- Time zone: UTC+
- Postal code: 678612
- OKTMO ID: 98608429106

Yefremovo (Russian: Ефремово) is a rural locality (a selo), one of two settlements, in addition to Onnyos and Tegyulte, in Amgino-Nakharinsky Rural Okrug of Aldansky District in the Sakha Republic, Russia. It is located 74 kilometers (46 mi) from Amga, the administrative center of the district and 7 kilometers (4.3 mi) from Onnyos, the centre of the settlement. Its population as of the 2010 Census was 29; up from 23 recorded in the 2002 Census.
