= Uoray =

Uoray Уорай
- Selo
- Interactive map of Uoray
- Location of Uoray Uoray (Sakha Republic)
- Coordinates: 60°54′N 132°12′E
- Country: Russia
- Federal subject: Sakha Republic
- Administrative district: Amginsky District
- Rural okrugSelsoviet: Butyunsky Rural Okrug

Population (2010 Census)
  - Total: 0
  - Estimate (2021): 0 )

Municipal status
  - Municipal district: Amginsky Municipal District
  - Rural settlement: Butyunsky Rural Settlement
- Time zone: UTC+
- Postal code: 678603
- OKTMO ID: 98608440106

Uoray (Russian: Уорай; Yakut: Уорай) is a rural locality (a selo), one of two settlements, in addition to Betyuntsy, in Butyunsky Rural Okrug of Aldansky District in the Sakha Republic, Russia. It is located 13 kilometers (8.1 mi) from Amga, the administrative center of the district and 4 kilometers (2.5 mi) from Betyuntsy. Its population as of the 2010 Census was 0; down from 5 recorded in the 2002 Census.
