= Kasharyata =

Kasharyata Кашарята
- Village
- Location within Ivanovo Oblast Location within Russia
- Coordinates: 56°50′N 42°37′E
- Country: Russia
- Region: Ivanovo Oblast
- District: Verkhnelandekhovsky District
- Time zone: UTC+3:00

Kasharyata (Russian: Кашарята) is a rural locality (a village) in Verkhnelandekhovsky District, Ivanovo Oblast, Russia. Population: 37 (2010 census); 44 (2002 census);

== Geography ==
This rural locality is located 1 km from Verkhny Landekh (the district's administrative centre), 102 km from Ivanovo (capital of Ivanovo Oblast) and 327 km from Moscow. Danilovo is the nearest rural locality.
