= Zadnyaya, Ivanovo Oblast =

Zadnyaya Задняя
- Village
- Location within Ivanovo Oblast Location within Russia
- Coordinates: 56°52′N 42°17′E
- Country: Russia
- Region: Ivanovo Oblast
- District: Verkhnelandekhovsky District
- Time zone: UTC+3:00

Zadnyaya (Russian: Задняя) is a rural locality (a village) in Verkhnelandekhovsky District, Ivanovo Oblast, Russia. Population: 11 (2010 census);

== Geography ==
This rural locality is located 19 km from Verkhny Landekh (the district's administrative centre), 82 km from Ivanovo (capital of Ivanovo Oblast) and 310 km from Moscow. Ignatovka is the nearest rural locality.
