= Solodikhino =

Solodikhino (Russian: Солодихино) is the name of several rural localities in Russia.

== Modern localities ==
- Solodikhino, Puchezhsky District, Ivanovo Oblast, a village in Puchezhsky District of Ivanovo Oblast
- Solodikhino, Verkhnelandekhovsky District, Ivanovo Oblast, a village in Verkhnelandekhovsky District of Ivanovo Oblast

== Abolished localities ==
- Solodikhino, Kostroma Oblast, a village in Zadorinsky Selsoviet of Parfenyevsky District in Kostroma Oblast; abolished on October 18, 2004
