= Knyazkovo =

Knyazkovo Князьково
- Village
- Location within Ivanovo Oblast Location within Russia
- Coordinates: 56°45′N 42°22′E
- Country: Russia
- Region: Ivanovo Oblast
- District: Verkhnelandekhovsky District
- Time zone: UTC+3:00

Knyazkovo (Russian: Князьково) is a rural locality (a village) in Verkhnelandekhovsky District, Ivanovo Oblast, Russia. Population: 42 (2010 census);

== Geography ==
This rural locality is located 16 km from Verkhny Landekh (the district's administrative centre), 90 km from Ivanovo (capital of Ivanovo Oblast) and 311 km from Moscow. Kozitsyno is the nearest rural locality.
