= Danilovo, Verkhnelandekhovsky District, Ivanovo Oblast =

Danilovo Данилово
- Village
- Location within Ivanovo Oblast Location within Russia
- Coordinates: 56°50′N 42°37′E
- Country: Russia
- Region: Ivanovo Oblast
- District: Verkhnelandekhovsky District
- Time zone: UTC+3:00

Danilovo (Russian: Данилово) is a rural locality (a village) in Verkhnelandekhovsky District, Ivanovo Oblast, Russia. Population: 19 (2010 census);

== Geography ==
This rural locality is located 1 km from Verkhny Landekh (the district's administrative centre), 102 km from Ivanovo (the capital of Ivanovo Oblast) and 327 km from Moscow. Kasharyata is the nearest rural locality.
