= Kislyata =

Kislyata Кислята
- Village
- Location within Ivanovo Oblast Location within Russia
- Coordinates: 56°50′N 42°41′E
- Country: Russia
- Region: Ivanovo Oblast
- District: Verkhnelandekhovsky District
- Time zone: UTC+3:00

Kislyata (Russian: Кислята) is a rural locality (a village) in Verkhnelandekhovsky District, Ivanovo Oblast, Russia. Population: 27 (2010 census); 35 (2002 census);

== Geography ==
This rural locality is located 5 km from Verkhny Landekh (the district's administrative centre), 106 km from Ivanovo (capital of Ivanovo Oblast) and 331 km from Moscow. Yakutino is the nearest rural locality.
