= Parshukovo =

Parshukovo Паршуково
- Village
- Location within Ivanovo Oblast Location within Russia
- Coordinates: 56°44′N 42°30′E
- Country: Russia
- Region: Ivanovo Oblast
- District: Verkhnelandekhovsky District
- Time zone: UTC+3:00

Parshukovo (Russian: Паршуково) is a rural locality (a village) in Verkhnelandekhovsky District, Ivanovo Oblast, Russia. Population: 18 (2010 census);

== Geography ==
This rural locality is located 12 km from Verkhny Landekh (the district's administrative centre), 98 km from Ivanovo (capital of Ivanovo Oblast) and 318 km from Moscow. Timino is the nearest rural locality.
