= Bortnoye Bolshoye =

Bortnoye Bolshoye Бортное Большое
- Village
- Location within Ivanovo Oblast Location within Russia
- Coordinates: 56°48′N 42°45′E
- Country: Russia
- Region: Ivanovo Oblast
- District: Verkhnelandekhovsky District
- Time zone: UTC+3:00

Bortnoye Bolshoye (Russian: Бортное Большое) is a rural locality (a village) in Verkhnelandekhovsky District, Ivanovo Oblast, Russia. Population: 21 (2010 census);

== Geography ==
This rural locality is located 10 km from Verkhny Landekh (the district's administrative centre), 111 km from Ivanovo (capital of Ivanovo Oblast) and 334 km from Moscow. Khormtsovo is the nearest rural locality.
