= Krutovskaya =

Krutovskaya Крутовская
- Village
- Location within Ivanovo Oblast Location within Russia
- Coordinates: 56°50′N 42°46′E
- Country: Russia
- Region: Ivanovo Oblast
- District: Verkhnelandekhovsky District
- Time zone: UTC+3:00

Krutovskaya (Russian: Крутовская) is a rural locality (a village) in Verkhnelandekhovsky District, Ivanovo Oblast, Russia. Population: 19 (2010 census);

== Geography ==
This rural locality is located 11 km from Verkhny Landekh (the district's administrative centre), 111 km from Ivanovo (capital of Ivanovo Oblast) and 336 km from Moscow. Zaseka is the nearest rural locality.
