= Ivankovo, Verkhnelandekhovsky District, Ivanovo Oblast =

Ivankovo Иваньково
- Village
- Location within Ivanovo Oblast Location within Russia
- Coordinates: 56°53′N 42°18′E
- Country: Russia
- Region: Ivanovo Oblast
- District: Verkhnelandekhovsky District
- Time zone: UTC+3:00

Ivankovo (Russian: Иваньково) is a rural locality (a village) in Verkhnelandekhovsky District, Ivanovo Oblast, Russia. Population: 21 (2010 census);

== Geography ==
This rural locality is located 18 km from Verkhny Landekh (the district's administrative centre), 82 km from Ivanovo (capital of Ivanovo Oblast) and 311 km from Moscow. Yurino is the nearest rural locality.
