= Bazhenovo, Ivanovo Oblast =

Bazhenovo Баженово
- Village
- Location within Ivanovo Oblast Location within Russia
- Coordinates: 56°50′N 42°47′E
- Country: Russia
- Region: Ivanovo Oblast
- District: Verkhnelandekhovsky District
- Time zone: UTC+3:00

Bazhenovo (Russian: Акнада) is a rural locality (a village) in Verkhnelandekhovsky District, Ivanovo Oblast, Russia. Population: 20 (2010 census);

== Geography ==
This rural locality is located 12 km from Verkhny Landekh (the district's administrative centre), 113 km from Ivanovo (capital of Ivanovo Oblast) and 337 km from Moscow. Zaseka is the nearest rural locality.
