= Osoki =

Osoki Осоки
- Village
- Location within Ivanovo Oblast Location within Russia
- Coordinates: 56°54′N 42°38′E
- Country: Russia
- Region: Ivanovo Oblast
- District: Verkhnelandekhovsky District
- Time zone: UTC+3:00

Osoki (Russian: Осоки) is a rural locality (a village) in Verkhnelandekhovsky District, Ivanovo Oblast, Russia. Population: 20 (2010 census);

== Geography ==
This rural locality is located 9 km from Verkhny Landekh (the district's administrative centre), 102 km from Ivanovo (capital of Ivanovo Oblast) and 331 km from Moscow. Baranovo is the nearest rural locality.
