= Olom-Kyuyole =

Olom-Kyuyole Олом-Кюёле
- Selo
- Interactive map of Olom-Kyuyole
- Location of Olom-Kyuyole Olom-Kyuyole (Sakha Republic)
- Coordinates: 61°17′N 130°53′E
- Country: Russia
- Federal subject: Sakha Republic
- Administrative district: Amginsky District
- Rural okrugSelsoviet: Emissky Rural Okrug

Population (2010 Census)
  - Total: 13
  - Estimate (2021): 6 (−53.8%)

Municipal status
  - Municipal district: Amginsky Municipal District
  - Rural settlement: Emissky Rural Settlement
- Time zone: UTC+
- Postal code: 678615
- OKTMO ID: 98608481106

Olom-Kyuyole (Russian: Олом-Кюёле; Yakut: Олом-Күөл, Olom-Küöl) is a rural locality (a selo) in Emissky Rural Okrug of Amginsky District in the Sakha Republic, Russia, located 100 kilometers (62 mi) from Amga, the administrative center of the district, and 26 kilometers (16 mi) from Emissy, the administrative center of the rural okrug. Its population as of the 2010 Census was 13; up from 9 recorded in the 2002 Census. Previously known as Olom (Олом), it was given its present name on March 4, 1999.
