= Gogoli =

Gogoli Гоголи
- Village
- Location within Ivanovo Oblast Location within Russia
- Coordinates: 56°42′N 42°16′E
- Country: Russia
- Region: Ivanovo Oblast
- District: Verkhnelandekhovsky District
- Time zone: UTC+3:00

Gogoli (Russian: Гоголи) is a rural locality (a village) in Verkhnelandekhovsky District, Ivanovo Oblast, Russia. Population: 7 (2010 census);

== Geography ==
This rural locality is located 24 km from Verkhny Landekh (the district's administrative centre), 85 km from Ivanovo (capital of Ivanovo Oblast) and 303 km from Moscow. Zubarikha is the nearest rural locality.
