= Tegyulte =

Tegyulte Тегюльте
- Selo
- Interactive map of Tegyulte
- Location of Tegyulte Tegyulte (Sakha Republic)
- Coordinates: 60°09′N 130°11′E
- Country: Russia
- Federal subject: Sakha Republic
- Administrative district: Amginsky District
- Rural okrugSelsoviet: Amgino-Nakharinsky Rural Okrug

Population (2010 Census)
  - Total: 13
  - Estimate (2021): 12 (−7.7%)

Municipal status
  - Municipal district: Amginsky Municipal District
  - Rural settlement: Amgino-Nakharinsky Rural Settlement
- Time zone: UTC+
- Postal code: 678612
- OKTMO ID: 98608429111

Tegyulte (Russian: Тегюльте; Yakut: Төгүлтэ, Tögülte) is a rural locality (a selo), one of three settlements, in addition to Onnyos and Yefremovo, in Amgino-Nakharinsky Rural Okrug of Aldansky District in the Sakha Republic, Russia. It is located 170 kilometers (110 mi) from Amga, the administrative center of the district and 89 kilometers (55 mi) from Onnyos, the settlement centre. Its population as of the 2010 Census was 13; up from 9 recorded in the 2002 Census.

== Climate ==
This town has an extreme subarctic climate. With a record low of −61.6 °C (−78.9 °F) and a record high of 38.8 °C (101.8 °F), Tegyulte's total temperature range is 100.4 °C (180.7 °F), making it one of the few places in the world with a temperature range of more than 100 °C (180 °F).

Climate data for Tegyulte (extremes 1942-present)
Month	Jan	Feb	Mar	Apr	May	Jun	Jul	Aug	Sep	Oct	Nov	Dec	Year
Record high °C (°F)	−5.0 (23.0)	−1.6 (29.1)	10.1 (50.2)	19.3 (66.7)	31.5 (88.7)	35.1 (95.2)	38.8 (101.8)	36.7 (98.1)	28.0 (82.4)	18.1 (64.6)	6.6 (43.9)	−2.6 (27.3)	38.8 (101.8)
Mean daily maximum °C (°F)	−31.2 (−24.2)	−23.6 (−10.5)	−8.7 (16.3)	4.0 (39.2)	14.9 (58.8)	23.5 (74.3)	25.9 (78.6)	22.3 (72.1)	12.8 (55.0)	−1.5 (29.3)	−20.1 (−4.2)	−32.3 (−26.1)	−1.2 (29.9)
Daily mean °C (°F)	−36.4 (−33.5)	−32.7 (−26.9)	−20.6 (−5.1)	−4.9 (23.2)	7.6 (45.7)	15.6 (60.1)	18.2 (64.8)	14.2 (57.6)	5.6 (42.1)	−7.0 (19.4)	−25.7 (−14.3)	−36.4 (−33.5)	−8.5 (16.6)
Mean daily minimum °C (°F)	−41.1 (−42.0)	−39.7 (−39.5)	−31.2 (−24.2)	−14.9 (5.2)	−0.3 (31.5)	6.4 (43.5)	9.9 (49.8)	6.4 (43.5)	−0.8 (30.6)	−12.4 (9.7)	−31.1 (−24.0)	−40.4 (−40.7)	−15.8 (3.6)
Record low °C (°F)	−61.6 (−78.9)	−58.1 (−72.6)	−55.8 (−68.4)	−44.5 (−48.1)	−18.7 (−1.7)	−9.1 (15.6)	−6.6 (20.1)	−10.0 (14.0)	−17.0 (1.4)	−43.3 (−45.9)	−54.4 (−65.9)	−59.8 (−75.6)	−61.6 (−78.9)
Average precipitation mm (inches)	12.9 (0.51)	8.8 (0.35)	7.0 (0.28)	10.0 (0.39)	28.4 (1.12)	32.6 (1.28)	51.3 (2.02)	52.9 (2.08)	41.3 (1.63)	23.0 (0.91)	19.6 (0.77)	12.2 (0.48)	300 (11.82)
Source: pogoda.ru.net
