= Starilovo =

Starilovo Старилово
- Village
- Location within Ivanovo Oblast Location within Russia
- Coordinates: 56°45′N 42°29′E
- Country: Russia
- Region: Ivanovo Oblast
- District: Verkhnelandekhovsky District
- Time zone: UTC+3:00

Starilovo (Russian: Старилово) is a rural locality (a village) in Verkhnelandekhovsky District, Ivanovo Oblast, Russia. Population: 226 (2010 census);

== Geography ==
This rural locality is located 11 km from Verkhny Landekh (the district's administrative centre), 97 km from Ivanovo (capital of Ivanovo Oblast) and 317 km from Moscow. Sakharovo is the nearest rural locality.
