= Chikhachevo =

Chikhachevo or Chikhachyovo (Чихачёво) is the name of several rural localities in Russia:

- Chikhachevo, Ivanovo Oblast, a village in Verkhnelandekhovsky District of Ivanovo Oblast
- Chikhachevo, Krasnoyarsk Krai, a village in Kazantsevsky Selsoviet of Shushensky District of Krasnoyarsk Krai
- Chikhachyovo, Bezhanitsky District, Pskov Oblast, a selo in Bezhanitsky District, Pskov Oblast
- Chikhachyovo, Velikoluksky District, Pskov Oblast, a village in Velikoluksky District, Pskov Oblast
