= Maryino, Verkhnelandekhovsky District, Ivanovo Oblast =

Maryino Марьино
- Village
- Location within Ivanovo Oblast Location within Russia
- Coordinates: 56°50′N 42°25′E
- Country: Russia
- Region: Ivanovo Oblast
- District: Verkhnelandekhovsky District
- Time zone: UTC+3:00

Maryino (Russian: Марьино) is a rural locality (a village) in Verkhnelandekhovsky District, Ivanovo Oblast, Russia. Population: 54 (2010 census);

== Geography ==
This rural locality is located 10 km from Verkhny Landekh (the district's administrative centre), 91 km from Ivanovo (capital of Ivanovo Oblast) and 316 km from Moscow. Perlevo is the nearest rural locality.
