= Daryino, Ivanovo Oblast =

Daryino Дарьино
- Village
- Location within Ivanovo Oblast Location within Russia
- Coordinates: 56°48′N 42°21′E
- Country: Russia
- Region: Ivanovo Oblast
- District: Verkhnelandekhovsky District
- Time zone: UTC+3:00

Daryino (Russian: Дарьино) is a rural locality (a village) in Verkhnelandekhovsky District, Ivanovo Oblast, Russia. Population: 5 (2010 census);

== Geography ==
This rural locality is located 15 km from Verkhny Landekh (the district's administrative centre), 88 km from Ivanovo (capital of Ivanovo Oblast) and 312 km from Moscow. Mishino is the nearest rural locality.
