= Detkovo =

Detkovo Детково
- Village
- Location within Ivanovo Oblast Location within Russia
- Coordinates: 56°49′N 42°23′E
- Country: Russia
- Region: Ivanovo Oblast
- District: Verkhnelandekhovsky District
- Time zone: UTC+3:00

Detkovo (Russian: Детково) is a rural locality (a village) in Verkhnelandekhovsky District, Ivanovo Oblast, Russia. Population: 9 (2010 census);

== Geography ==
This rural locality is located 12 km from Verkhny Landekh (the district's administrative centre), 89 km from Ivanovo (capital of Ivanovo Oblast) and 314 km from Moscow. Petelino is the nearest rural locality.
