= Maklakovo, Verkhnelandekhovsky District, Ivanovo Oblast =

Maklakovo Маклаково
- Village
- Location within Ivanovo Oblast Location within Russia
- Coordinates: 56°48′N 42°27′E
- Country: Russia
- Region: Ivanovo Oblast
- District: Verkhnelandekhovsky District
- Time zone: UTC+3:00

Maklakovo (Russian: Маклаково) is a rural locality (a village) in Verkhnelandekhovsky District, Ivanovo Oblast, Russia. Population: 32 (2010 census);

== Geography ==
This rural locality is located 8 km from Verkhny Landekh (the district's administrative centre), 93 km from Ivanovo (capital of Ivanovo Oblast) and 318 km from Moscow. Zabolotye is the nearest rural locality.
