= Chakyr 2-y =

Chakyr 2-y Чакыр 2-й Иккис Чакыр (Yakut)
- Selo
- Interactive map of Chakyr 2-y
- Location of Chakyr 2-y Chakyr 2-y (Sakha Republic)
- Coordinates: 60°51′N 131°50′E
- Country: Russia
- Federal subject: Sakha Republic
- Administrative district: Amginsky District
- Rural okrugSelsoviet: Chakyrsky Rural Okrug

Area
  - Total: 1.304 km^{2} (0.503 sq mi)

Population (2010 Census)
  - Total: 579
  - Estimate (January 2016): 497 (−14.2%)
  - Density: 444/km^{2} (1,150/sq mi)

Administrative status
  - Capital of: Chakyrsky Rural Okrug

Municipal status
  - Municipal district: Amginsky Municipal District
  - Rural settlement: Chakyrsky Rural Settlement
  - Capital of: Chakyrsky Rural Settlement
- Time zone: UTC+
- Postal code: 678606
- OKTMO ID: 98608470101

Chakyr 2-y (Russian: Чакыр 2-й; Yakut: Иккис Чакыр) is a rural locality (a selo). It is the only inhabited locality, and the administrative center of Chakyrsky Rural Okrug in Amginsky District of the Sakha Republic, Russia. Its size is 1.304 km².

== Population ==
In the 2002 Census, the population was reported to be 686 people. 96% of that population consisted of Yakuts. The population was recorded to have reduced to 579 as of the 2010 Census. This census also reported that in this population, 275 were people were men and 304 women (47.5% and 52.5%, respectively).

Following this, the 2012 census declared a population of 564, the 2013 as 537, the 2014 as 514, and the 2015 and 2016 as 497.

== Geography ==
The selo is located in the southeastern part of central Sakha Republic, on the right bank of the Amga River. It is located 15 kilometers (9.3 mi) from Amga, the administrative center of the ulus (district).

There are several streets inside the selo. These streets are:

- Bessonova St. (Russian: ул. Бессонова)
- Lenin St. (Russian: ул. Ленина)
- Lesnaya St. (Russian: ул. Лесная)
- Lyaginskaya St. (Russian: ул. Лягинская)
- Molodyozhnaya St. (Russian: ул. Молодёжная)
- Muksunskaya St. (Russian: ул. Муксунская)
- Naberezhnaya St. (Russian: ул. Набережная)

There is also the MBOU Chakyrskaya Secondary School named after Yakovleva-Erilik Eristina (МБОУ Чакырская СОШ им. С. С. Яковлева-Эрилик Эристина), a cultural centre, and an office belonging to Russian Post.

== Climate ==
The climate can be described as continental, with cold winters and relatively warm summers. The temperature in winter can drop significantly and is often very harsh with extreme lows.
