= Ploskiryata =

Ploskiryata Плоскирята
- Village
- Location within Ivanovo Oblast Location within Russia
- Coordinates: 56°48′N 42°35′E
- Country: Russia
- Region: Ivanovo Oblast
- District: Verkhnelandekhovsky District
- Time zone: UTC+3:00

Ploskiryata (Russian: Плоскирята) is a rural locality (a village) in Verkhnelandekhovsky District, Ivanovo Oblast, Russia. Population: 10 (2010 census);

== Geography ==
This rural locality is located 4 km from Verkhny Landekh (the district's administrative centre), 102 km from Ivanovo (capital of Ivanovo Oblast) and 325 km from Moscow. Krutye is the nearest rural locality.
