= Zhernokovo, Ivanovo Oblast =

Zhernokovo Жерноково
- Village
- Location within Ivanovo Oblast Location within Russia
- Coordinates: 56°56′N 42°35′E
- Country: Russia
- Region: Ivanovo Oblast
- District: Verkhnelandekhovsky District
- Time zone: UTC+3:00

Zhernokovo (Russian: Жерноково) is a rural locality (a village) in Verkhnelandekhovsky District, Ivanovo Oblast, Russia. Population: 10 (2010 census);

== Geography ==
This rural locality is located 11 km from Verkhny Landekh (the district's administrative centre), 99 km from Ivanovo (capital of Ivanovo Oblast) and 329 km from Moscow. Obukhovo is the nearest rural locality.
