= Brusovo Bolshoye =

Brusovo Bolshoye Брусово Большое
- Village
- Location within Ivanovo Oblast Location within Russia
- Coordinates: 56°54′N 42°30′E
- Country: Russia
- Region: Ivanovo Oblast
- District: Verkhnelandekhovsky District
- Time zone: UTC+3:00

Brusovo Bolshoye (Russian: Брусово Большое) is a rural locality (a village) in Verkhnelandekhovsky District, Ivanovo Oblast, Russia. Population: 20 (2010 census); There are 2 streets in this village.

== Geography ==
This rural locality is located 9 km from Verkhny Landekh (the district's administrative centre), 94 km from Ivanovo (capital of Ivanovo Oblast) and 323 km from Moscow. Bakhayevskaya is the nearest rural locality.
