= Krutye, Ivanovo Oblast =

Krutye Крутые
- Village
- Location within Ivanovo Oblast Location within Russia
- Coordinates: 56°48′N 42°37′E
- Country: Russia
- Region: Ivanovo Oblast
- District: Verkhnelandekhovsky District
- Time zone: UTC+3:00

Krutye (Russian: Крутые) is a rural locality (a village) in Verkhnelandekhovsky District, Ivanovo Oblast, Russia. Population: 19 (2010 census);

== Geography ==
This rural locality is located 4 km from Verkhny Landekh (the district's administrative centre), 103 km from Ivanovo (capital of Ivanovo Oblast) and 326 km from Moscow. Zenino is the nearest rural locality.
