= Tokarevo, Verkhnelandekhovsky District, Ivanovo Oblast =

Tokarevo Токарево
- Village
- Location within Ivanovo Oblast Location within Russia
- Coordinates: 56°50′N 42°34′E
- Country: Russia
- Region: Ivanovo Oblast
- District: Verkhnelandekhovsky District
- Time zone: UTC+3:00

Tokarevo (Russian: Токарево) is a rural locality (a village) in Verkhnelandekhovsky District, Ivanovo Oblast, Russia. Population: 216 (2010 census);

== Geography ==
This rural locality is located 2 km from Verkhny Landekh (the district's administrative centre), 99 km from Ivanovo (capital of Ivanovo Oblast) and 324 km from Moscow. Tatyanikha is the nearest rural locality.
