= Zaglupanye =

Zaglupanye Заглупанье
- Village
- Location within Ivanovo Oblast Location within Russia
- Coordinates: 56°52′N 42°40′E
- Country: Russia
- Region: Ivanovo Oblast
- District: Verkhnelandekhovsky District
- Time zone: UTC+3:00

Zaglupanye (Russian: Заглупанье) is a rural locality (a village) in Verkhnelandekhovsky District, Ivanovo Oblast, Russia. Population: 5 (2010 census);

== Geography ==
This rural locality is located 6 km from Verkhny Landekh (the district's administrative centre), 104 km from Ivanovo (capital of Ivanovo Oblast) and 331 km from Moscow. Kazaryata is the nearest rural locality.
