= Simakovo, Ivanovo Oblast =

Simakovo Симаково
- Selo
- Location within Ivanovo Oblast Location within Russia
- Coordinates: 56°52′N 42°45′E
- Country: Russia
- Region: Ivanovo Oblast
- District: Verkhnelandekhovsky District
- Time zone: UTC+3:00

Simakovo (Russian: Симаково) is a rural locality (a selo) in Verkhnelandekhovsky District, Ivanovo Oblast, Russia. Population: 284 (2010 census);

== Geography ==
This rural locality is located 11 km from Verkhny Landekh (the district's administrative centre), 110 km from Ivanovo (capital of Ivanovo Oblast) and 337 km from Moscow. Markovo is the nearest rural locality.
