= Shatunovo, Ivanovo Oblast =

Shatunovo Шатуново
- Village
- Location within Ivanovo Oblast Location within Russia
- Coordinates: 56°54′N 42°32′E
- Country: Russia
- Region: Ivanovo Oblast
- District: Verkhnelandekhovsky District
- Time zone: UTC+3:00

Shatunovo (Russian: Шатуново) is a rural locality (a village) in Verkhnelandekhovsky District, Ivanovo Oblast, Russia. Population: 47 (2010 census);

== Geography ==
This rural locality is located 8 km from Verkhny Landekh (the district's administrative centre), 96 km from Ivanovo (capital of Ivanovo Oblast) and 325 km from Moscow. Lykhovo is the nearest rural locality.
