= Pogorelka, Verkhnelandekhovsky District, Ivanovo Oblast =

Pogorelka Погорелка
- Village
- Location within Ivanovo Oblast Location within Russia
- Coordinates: 56°52′N 42°35′E
- Country: Russia
- Region: Ivanovo Oblast
- District: Verkhnelandekhovsky District
- Time zone: UTC+3:00

Pogorelka (Russian: Погорелка) is a rural locality (a village) in Verkhnelandekhovsky District, Ivanovo Oblast, Russia. Population: 5 (2010 census);

== Geography ==
This rural locality is located 4 km from Verkhny Landekh (the district's administrative centre), 100 km from Ivanovo (capital of Ivanovo Oblast) and 327 km from Moscow. Zubyata is the nearest rural locality.
