= Yakutino, Ivanovo Oblast =

Yakutino Якутино
- Village
- Location within Ivanovo Oblast Location within Russia
- Coordinates: 56°49′N 42°41′E
- Country: Russia
- Region: Ivanovo Oblast
- District: Verkhnelandekhovsky District
- Time zone: UTC+3:00

Yakutino (Russian: Якутино) is a rural locality (a village) in Verkhnelandekhovsky District, Ivanovo Oblast, Russia. Population: 14 (2010 census);

== Geography ==
This rural locality is located 6 km from Verkhny Landekh (the district's administrative centre), 107 km from Ivanovo (capital of Ivanovo Oblast) and 331 km from Moscow. Kislyata is the nearest rural locality.
