= Bulun =

Bulun (Russian: Булун) may refer to:

- Bulun (river), a river in Magadan Oblast, Russia
- Bulun, Tattinsky District, Sakha Republic, a rural locality in Aldansky Rural Okrug, Tattinsky District, Sakha Republic, Russia
- Bulun, Amginsky District, Sakha Republic, a rural locality in Maysky Rural Okrug, Amginsky District, Sakha Republic, Russia

== See also ==
- Bulunsky District, an administrative and municipal district in the Sakha Republic
