= Bulun, Amginsky District, Sakha Republic =

Bulun Булун Булуҥ (Yakut)
- Selo
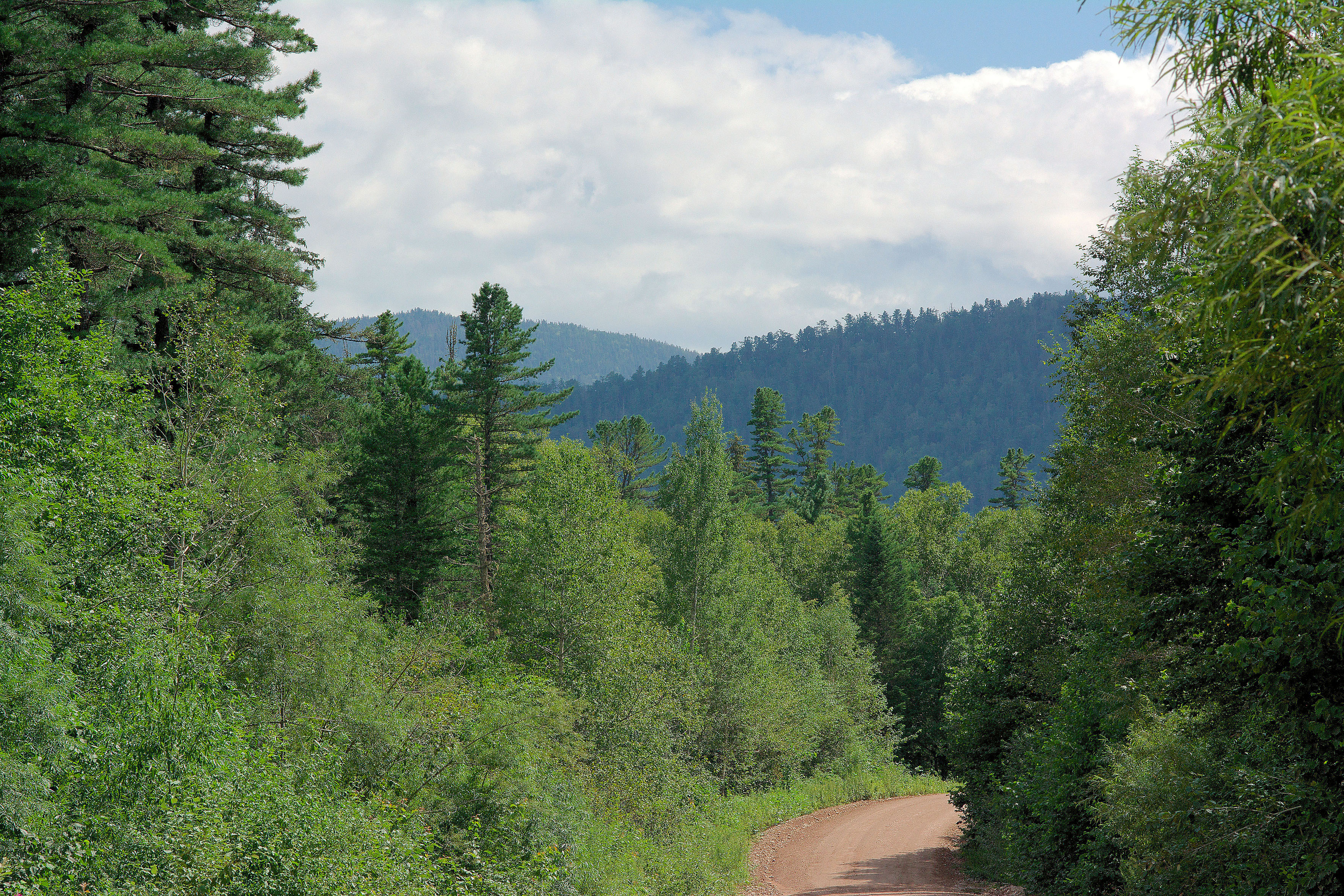
- Valley of the Amga, the river on which Bulun is situated
- Interactive map of Bulun
- Location of Bulun Bulun (Sakha Republic)
- Coordinates: 60°39′N 131°40′E
- Country: Russia
- Federal subject: Sakha Republic
- Administrative district: Amginsky District
- Rural okrugSelsoviet: Maysky Rural Okrug

Area
  - Total: 0.16 km^{2} (0.062 sq mi)

Population (2010 Census)
  - Total: 1
  - Estimate (2021): 0 (−100%)
  - Density: 6.2/km^{2} (16/sq mi)

Municipal status
  - Municipal district: Amginsky Municipal District
  - Rural settlement: Maysky Rural Settlement
- Time zone: UTC+
- Postal code: 678610
- OKTMO ID: 98608452106

Bulun (Russian: Булун, Yakut: Булуҥ) is a rural locality (a selo). It is one of two settlements, in addition to Pokrovka, in the Maysky Rural Okrug of the Amginsky District in the Sakha Republic, Russia.

== Population ==
The population was reported to be of 8 people in the 2002 Census. Half that population was Russian. As of the 2010 Census and 2015 Census, it was reported to be of just 1 male. The 2021 Census reported that the selo is uninhabited.

== Geography ==
The selo is located in the southeastern part of the Sakha Republic, on the right bank of the Amga River. It is located 41 kilometers (25 mi) southwest of Amga, the administrative center of the ulus (district) and 14 kilometers (8.7 mi) from Pokrovka.

It has one street, named after Tselinnikov.

== Economy ==
The village had developed agriculture.
