= Bolugur =

Bolugur Болугур
- Selo
- Interactive map of Bolugur
- Location of Bolugur Bolugur (Sakha Republic)
- Coordinates: 60°36′N 131°28′E
- Country: Russia
- Federal subject: Sakha Republic
- Administrative district: Amginsky District
- Rural okrugSelsoviet: Bolugursky Rural Okrug

Population (2010 Census)
  - Total: 1,507
  - Estimate (January 2016): 1,413 (−6.2%)

Administrative status
  - Capital of: Bolugursky Rural Okrug

Municipal status
  - Municipal district: Amginsky Municipal District
  - Rural settlement: Bolugursky Rural Settlement
  - Capital of: Bolugursky Rural Settlement
- Time zone: UTC+
- Postal code: 678611
- OKTMO ID: 98608446101

Bolugur (Russian: Болугур; Yakut: Болугур) is a rural locality (a selo), the only inhabited locality, and the administrative center of Bolugursky Rural Okrug in Amginsky District of the Sakha Republic, Russia, located 53 kilometers (33 mi) from Amga, the administrative center of the district. Its population as of the 2010 Census was 1,507, up from 1,444 recorded during the 2002 Census.
