= Yefremovo, Verkhnelandekhovsky District, Ivanovo Oblast =

Yefremovo Ефремово
- Village
- Location within Ivanovo Oblast Location within Russia
- Coordinates: 56°51′N 42°25′E
- Country: Russia
- Region: Ivanovo Oblast
- District: Verkhnelandekhovsky District
- Time zone: UTC+3:00

Yefremovo (Russian: Ефремово) is a rural locality (a village) in Verkhnelandekhovsky District, Ivanovo Oblast, Russia. Population: 19 (2010 census);

== Geography ==
This rural locality is located 10 km from Verkhny Landekh (the district's administrative centre), 90 km from Ivanovo (capital of Ivanovo Oblast) and 317 km from Moscow. Moshkovo is the nearest rural locality.
