= Mikhaylovka, Sakha Republic =

Mikhaylovka Михайловка
- Selo
- Interactive map of Mikhaylovka
- Location of Mikhaylovka Mikhaylovka (Sakha Republic)
- Coordinates: 61°12′N 132°41′E
- Country: Russia
- Federal subject: Sakha Republic
- Administrative district: Amginsky District
- Rural okrugSelsoviet: Somorsunsky Rural Okrug

Population (2010 Census)
  - Total: 859
  - Estimate (January 2016): 817 (−4.9%)

Administrative status
  - Capital of: Somorsunsky Rural Okrug

Municipal status
  - Municipal district: Amginsky Municipal District
  - Rural settlement: Somorsunsky Rural Settlement
  - Capital of: Somorsunsky Rural Settlement
- Time zone: UTC+
- Postal code: 678605
- OKTMO ID: 98608460101

Mikhaylovka (Russian: Михайловка) is a rural locality (a selo), the only inhabited locality, and the administrative center of Somorsunsky Rural Okrug in Amginsky District of the Sakha Republic, Russia, located 59 kilometers (37 mi) from Amga, the administrative center of the district. Its population as of the 2010 Census was 859, down from 878 recorded during the 2002 Census.
