= Promkombinat =

Promkombinat Промкомбинат
- Selo
- Interactive map of Promkombinat
- Location of Promkombinat Promkombinat (Sakha Republic)
- Coordinates: 60°54′N 132°01′E
- Country: Russia
- Federal subject: Sakha Republic
- Administrative district: Amginsky District
- Rural okrugSelsoviet: Chapchylgansky Rural Okrug

Population (2010 Census)
  - Total: 172
  - Estimate (2021): 243 (+41.3%)

Municipal status
  - Municipal district: Amginsky Municipal District
  - Rural settlement: Chapchylgansky Rural Settlement
- Time zone: UTC+
- Postal code: 678600
- OKTMO ID: 98608472106

Promkombinat (Russian: Промкомбинат) is a rural locality (a selo), one of two settlements, in addition to Chapchylgan, in Chapchylgansky Rural Okrug of Aldansky District in the Sakha Republic, Russia. It is located 2 kilometers (1.2 mi) from Amga, the administrative center of the district and 1 kilometer (0.62 mi) from Chapchylgan. Its population as of the 2010 Census was 172; up from 161 recorded in the 2002 Census.
