= Notora =

Notora Нотора / Нуотара
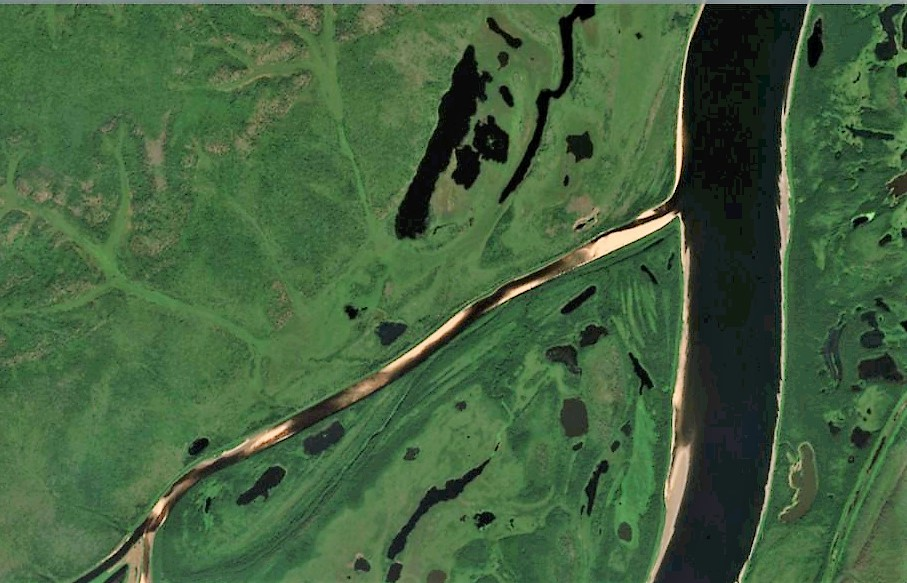
- Confluence of the Notora and the Aldan Sentinel-2 image

- Mouth location in Yakutia, Russia

Location
- Country: Russian Federation

Physical characteristics
- Source: Near Amga
  - coordinates: 61°02′15″N 132°31′17″E
- Mouth: Aldan River
  - coordinates: 61°02′32″N 135°26′18″E
  - elevation: 140 m (460 ft)
- Length: 308 km (191 mi)
- Basin size: 7,440 km^{2} (2,870 sq mi)
- Discharge
  - average: 7 m^{3}/s (250 cu ft/s) 37 km (23 mi) from the mouth

Basin features
- Progression: Aldan→ Lena→ Laptev Sea

The Notora (Russian: Нотора; Yakut: Нуотара) is a river in Yakutia (Sakha Republic), Russia, a left tributary of the Aldan, part of the Lena basin. It has a length of 308 kilometres (191 mi) and a drainage basin area of 7,440 square kilometres (2,870 mi^{2}).

There is a bridge of the Yakutsk — Amga — Ust-Maya highway across the river. It was inaugurated in November 2018.

== Course ==
The Notora has its sources in the fringes of the Lena Plateau near Amga village, not far to the southeast from the Amga river valley. The river flows roughly eastwards all along its course. In its last stretch it enters the wide floodplain of the Aldan and makes a slight bend to the northeast. Finally it meets the left bank of the Aldan River 706 km (439 mi) from its confluence with the Lena River.

=== Tributaries ===
The main tributaries of the Notora are the 48 km (30 mi) long Khatarchyma (Uulakh-Salaa), the 41 km (25 mi) long Nyigirime and the 67 km (42 mi) long Dukha (Дьуха) on the left. The Notora is fed mainly by snow and rain. Floods are frequent in the summer and its flow decreases significantly in the winter. There are about 1,200 lakes in the river basin.

== See also ==
- List of rivers of Russia
