= Satagay, Amginsky District, Sakha Republic =

Satagay Сатагай
- Selo
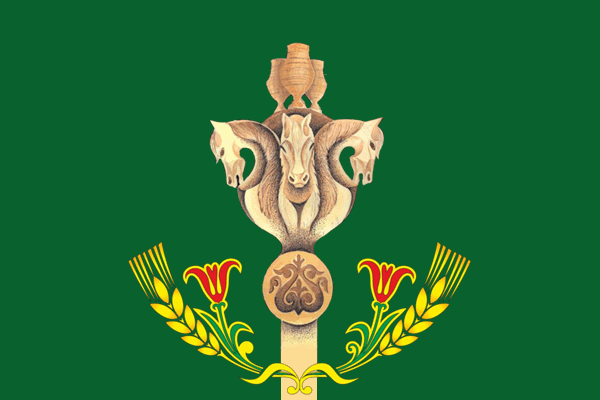
- Flag
- Interactive map of Satagay
- Location of Satagay Satagay (Sakha Republic)
- Coordinates: 61°33′N 131°34′E
- Country: Russia
- Federal subject: Sakha Republic
- Administrative district: Amginsky District
- Rural okrugSelsoviet: Satagaysky Rural Okrug

Population (2010 Census)
  - Total: 570
  - Estimate (January 2016): 536 (−6%)

Administrative status
  - Capital of: Satagaysky Rural Okrug

Municipal status
  - Municipal district: Amginsky Municipal District
  - Rural settlement: Satagaysky Rural Settlement
  - Capital of: Satagaysky Rural Settlement
- Time zone: UTC+
- Postal code: 678608
- OKTMO ID: 98608458101

Satagay (Russian: Сатагай; Yakut: Сатаҕай, Satağay) is a rural locality (a selo), the only inhabited locality, and the administrative center of Satagaysky Rural Okrug in Amginsky District of the Sakha Republic, Russia, located 132 kilometers (82 mi) from Amga, the administrative center of the district. Its population as of the 2010 Census was 570, up from 561 recorded during the 2002 Census.

It is one of the centers of population located in the Suola River basin.
