= Myandigi =

Myandigi Мяндиги
- Selo
- Interactive map of Myandigi
- Location of Myandigi Myandigi (Sakha Republic)
- Coordinates: 61°11′N 132°32′E
- Country: Russia
- Federal subject: Sakha Republic
- Administrative district: Amginsky District
- Rural okrugSelsoviet: Myandiginsky Rural Okrug

Population (2010 Census)
  - Total: 435
  - Estimate (January 2016): 382 (−12.2%)

Administrative status
  - Capital of: Myandiginsky Rural Okrug

Municipal status
  - Municipal district: Amginsky Municipal District
  - Rural settlement: Myandiginsky Rural Settlement
  - Capital of: Myandiginsky Rural Settlement
- Time zone: UTC+
- Postal codes: 678605, 678616
- OKTMO ID: 98608455101

Myandigi (Russian: Мяндиги; Yakut: Мээндиги, Meendigi) is a rural locality (a selo), the only inhabited locality, and the administrative center of Myandiginsky Rural Okrug in Amginsky District of the Sakha Republic, Russia, located 48 kilometers (30 mi) from Amga, the administrative center of the district. Its population as of the 2010 Census was 435, up from 417 recorded during the 2002 Census.
