= Altantsy =

Altantsy Алтанцы
- Selo
- Interactive map of Altantsy
- Location of Altantsy Altantsy (Sakha Republic)
- Coordinates: 61°28′N 131°29′E
- Country: Russia
- Federal subject: Sakha Republic
- Administrative district: Amginsky District
- Rural okrugSelsoviet: Altansky Rural Okrug

Population (2010 Census)
  - Total: 814
  - Estimate (January 2016): 744 (−8.6%)

Administrative status
  - Capital of: Altansky Rural Okrug

Municipal status
  - Municipal district: Amginsky Municipal District
  - Rural settlement: Altansky Rural Settlement
  - Capital of: Altansky Rural Settlement
- Time zone: UTC+
- Postal code: 678602
- OKTMO ID: 98608414101

Altantsy (Russian: Алтанцы; Yakut: Алтан, Altan) is a rural locality (a selo), the only inhabited locality, and the administrative center of Altansky Rural Okrug in Amginsky District of the Sakha Republic, Russia, located 120 kilometers (75 mi) from Amga, the administrative center of the district. Its population as of the 2010 Census was 814, down from 979 recorded during the 2002 Census.
