= Sulgachchy =

Sulgachchy Сулгаччы
- Selo
- Interactive map of Sulgachchy
- Location of Sulgachchy Sulgachchy (Sakha Republic)
- Coordinates: 61°31′N 132°57′E
- Country: Russia
- Federal subject: Sakha Republic
- Administrative district: Amginsky District
- Rural okrugSelsoviet: Sulgachchinsky Rural Okrug

Population (2010 Census)
  - Total: 444
  - Estimate (2021): 464 (+4.5%)

Administrative status
  - Capital of: Sulgachchinsky Rural Okrug

Municipal status
  - Municipal district: Amginsky Municipal District
  - Rural settlement: Sulgachchinsky Rural Settlement
  - Capital of: Sulgachchinsky Rural Settlement
- Time zone: UTC+
- Postal code: 678607
- OKTMO ID: 98608465101

Sulgachchy (Russian: Сулгаччы; Yakut: Сулҕаччы, Sulğaççı) is a rural locality (a selo), the administrative centre of and one of two settlements, in addition to Serge-Bes, in Sulgachchinsky Rural Okrug of Amginsky District in the Sakha Republic, Russia. It is located 107 kilometers (66 mi) from Amga, the administrative center of the district. Its population as of the 2010 Census was 444; up from 442 recorded in the 2002 Census.
