= Solodikhino, Verkhnelandekhovsky District, Ivanovo Oblast =

Solodikhino Солодихино
- Village
- Location within Ivanovo Oblast Location within Russia
- Coordinates: 56°51′N 42°47′E
- Country: Russia
- Region: Ivanovo Oblast
- District: Verkhnelandekhovsky District
- Time zone: UTC+3:00

Solodikhino (Russian: Солодихино) is a rural locality (a village) in Verkhnelandekhovsky District, Ivanovo Oblast, Russia. Population: 10 (2010 census);

== Geography ==
This rural locality is located 12 km from Verkhny Landekh (the district's administrative centre), 112 km from Ivanovo (capital of Ivanovo Oblast) and 338 km from Moscow. Markovo is the nearest rural locality.
