= Serge-Bes =

Serge-Bes Серге-Бес
- Selo
- Interactive map of Serge-Bes
- Location of Serge-Bes Serge-Bes (Sakha Republic)
- Coordinates: 61°29′N 132°56′E
- Country: Russia
- Federal subject: Sakha Republic
- Administrative district: Amginsky District
- Rural okrugSelsoviet: Sulgachchinsky Rural Okrug

Population (2010 Census)
  - Total: 265
  - Estimate (2021): 259 (−2.3%)

Municipal status
  - Municipal district: Amginsky Municipal District
  - Rural settlement: Sulgachchinsky Rural Settlement
- Time zone: UTC+
- Postal code: 678607
- OKTMO ID: 98608465106

Serge-Bes (Russian: Серге-Бес; Yakut: Сэргэ Бэс, Serge Bes) is a rural locality (a selo), one of two settlements, in addition to Sulgachchy, in Sulgachchinsky Rural Okrug of Aldansky District in the Sakha Republic, Russia. It is located 90 kilometers (56 mi) from Amga, the administrative center of the district and 10 kilometers (6.2 mi) from Sulgachchy. Its population as of the 2010 Census was 265; up from 252 recorded in the 2002 Census.
