= Pokrovka, Sakha Republic =

Pokrovka Покровка
- Selo
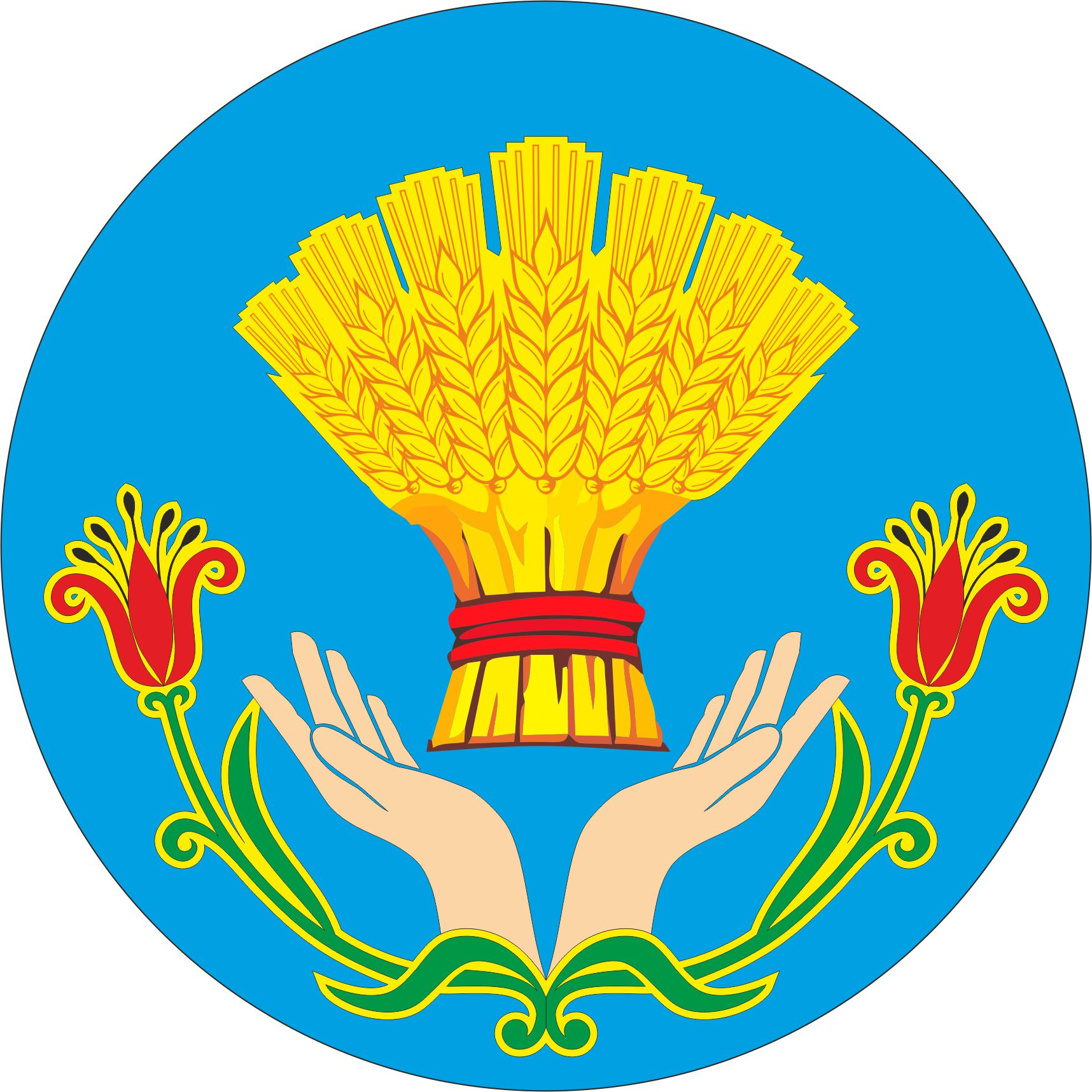
- Coat of arms
- Interactive map of Pokrovka
- Location of Pokrovka Pokrovka (Sakha Republic)
- Coordinates: 60°45′N 131°49′E
- Country: Russia
- Federal subject: Sakha Republic
- Administrative district: Amginsky District
- Rural okrugSelsoviet: Maysky Rural Okrug
- Elevation: 208 m (682 ft)

Population (2010 Census)
  - Total: 681
  - Estimate (2021): 596 (−12.5%)

Administrative status
  - Capital of: Maysky Rural Okrug

Municipal status
  - Municipal district: Amginsky Municipal District
  - Rural settlement: Maysky Rural Settlement
  - Capital of: Maysky Rural Settlement
- Time zone: UTC+
- Postal code: 678610
- OKTMO ID: 98608452101

Pokrovka (Russian: Покровка) is a rural locality (a selo), the administrative centre of and one of two settlements, in addition to Bulun, in Maysky Rural Okrug of Amginsky District in the Sakha Republic, Russia. It is located 25 kilometers (16 mi) from Amga, the administrative center of the district. Its population as of the 2010 Census was 681; up from 668 recorded in the 2002 Census.
