= Chapchylgan =

Chapchylgan Чапчылган
- Selo
- Interactive map of Chapchylgan
- Location of Chapchylgan Chapchylgan (Sakha Republic)
- Coordinates: 60°54′N 132°01′E
- Country: Russia
- Federal subject: Sakha Republic
- Administrative district: Amginsky District
- Rural okrugSelsoviet: Chapchylgansky Rural Okrug

Population (2010 Census)
  - Total: 690
  - Estimate (2021): 969 (+40.4%)

Administrative status
  - Capital of: Chapchylgansky Rural Okrug

Municipal status
  - Municipal district: Amginsky Municipal District
  - Rural settlement: Chapchylgansky Rural Settlement
  - Capital of: Chapchylgansky Rural Settlement
- Time zone: UTC+
- Postal code: 678600
- OKTMO ID: 98608472101

Chapchylgan (Russian: Чапчылган; Yakut: Чапчылҕан, Çapçılğan) is a rural locality (a selo), the administrative centre of and one of two settlements, in addition to Promkombinat, in Chapchylgansky Rural Okrug of Amginsky District in the Sakha Republic, Russia. It is located 3 kilometers (1.9 mi) from Amga, the administrative center of the district. Its population as of the 2010 Census was 690; up from 658 recorded in the 2002 Census.
