= Amginsky District =

Amginsky District Амгинский улус (Russian)
- District

Other transcription(s)
  - Yakut: Амма улууhа
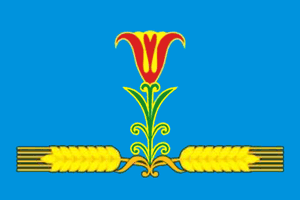
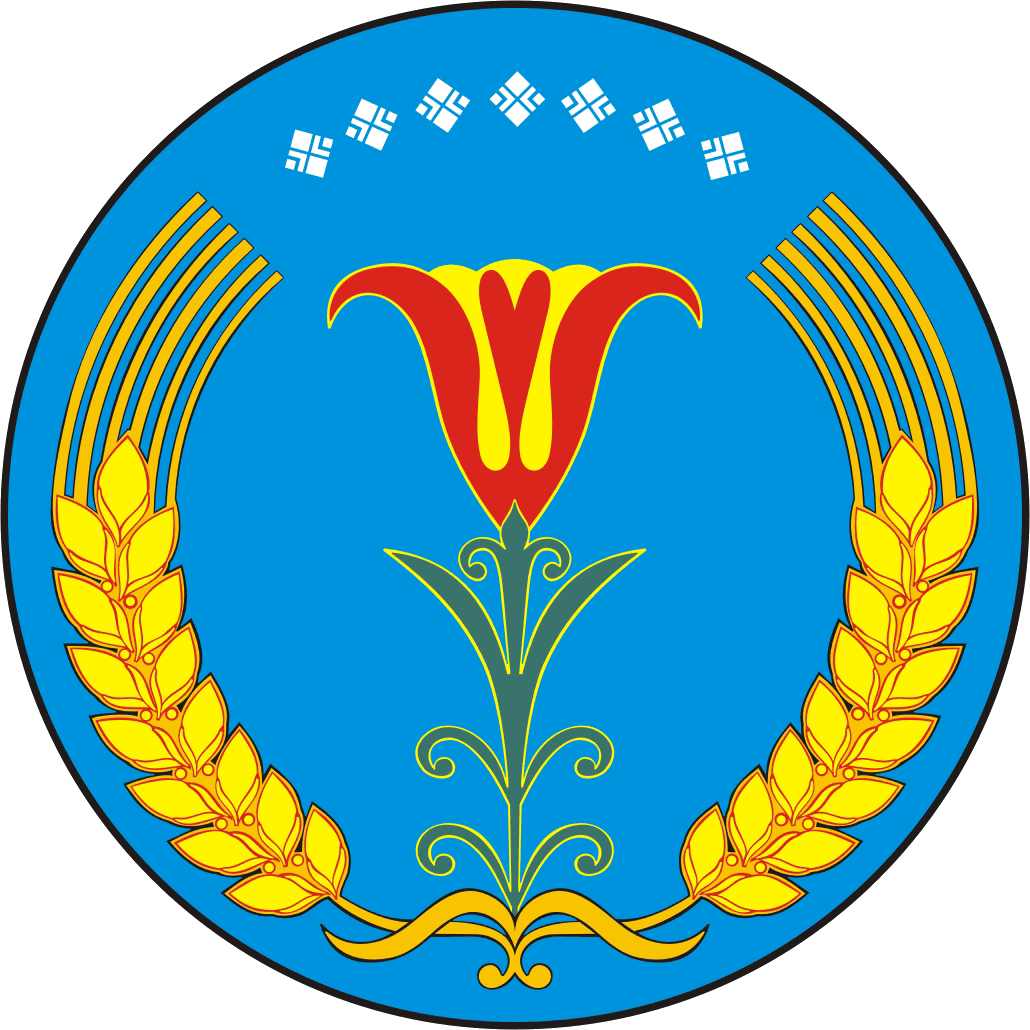
- Flag Coat of arms
- Location of Amginsky District in the Sakha Republic
- Coordinates: 60°24′N 130°54′E
- Country: Russia
- Federal subject: Sakha Republic
- Established: January 9, 1930
- Administrative center: Amga

Area
  - Total: 29,400 km^{2} (11,400 sq mi)

Population (2010 Census)
  - Total: 17,183
  - Density: 0.584/km^{2} (1.51/sq mi)
  - Urban: 0%
  - Rural: 100%

Administrative structure
  - Administrative divisions: 14 Rural okrugs
  - Inhabited localities: 21 rural localities

Municipal structure
  - Municipally incorporated as: Amginsky Municipal District
  - Municipal divisions: 0 urban settlements, 14 rural settlements
- Time zone: UTC+9 (UTC+09:00)
- OKTMO ID: 98608000
- Website: https://mr-amginskij.sakha.gov.ru/

Population of Amginsky District
- 2010 Census: 17,183
- 2002 Census: 17,251
- 1989 Census: 15,452
- 1979 Census: 12,547

Amginsky District (Russian: Амги́нский улу́с; Yakut: Амма улууһа, Amma uluuha) is an administrative and municipal district (raion, or ulus), one of the thirty-four in the Sakha Republic, Russia. It is located in the southeast of the republic and borders with Churapchinsky District in the north, Ust-Maysky District in the east and southeast, Aldansky District in the south and southwest, and with Khangalassky and Megino-Kangalassky Districts in the northwest. The area of the district is 29,400 square kilometers (11,400 sq mi). Its administrative center is the rural locality (a selo) of Amga. As of the 2010 Census, the total population of the district was 17,183, with the population of Amga accounting for 38.0% of that number.

== Geography ==
Amginsky is on flat terrain of the Prilenskoye Plateau (Lena Plateau). The main river in the district is the Amga, which flows from southwest to northwest through the middle of district. The Amga enters the Aldan River about 140 km northeast of Amginsky District, which in turn flows west to the Lena River. The Tatta and the Suola River also flow through the district. Amginsky District is about 100 km southeast of Yakutsk on the Lena.

=== Climate ===
Average January temperature ranges from −42 to −38 °C (−44 to −36 °F) and average July temperature ranges from +16 to +18 °C (61 to 64 °F). Average precipitation is about 200–250 millimeters (7.9–9.8 in).

== History ==
The district was established on January 9, 1930.

== Administrative and municipal status ==
Within the framework of administrative divisions, Amginsky District is one of the thirty-four in the republic. The district is divided into fourteen rural okrugs (naslegs) which comprise twenty-one rural localities. As a municipal division, the district is incorporated as Amginsky Municipal District. Its fourteen rural okrugs are incorporated into fourteen rural settlements within the municipal district. The selo of Amga serves as the administrative center of both the administrative and municipal district.

=== Inhabited localities ===
Administrative/municipal composition
Rural okrugs/Rural settlements	Population	Rural localities in jurisdiction*
Abaginsky (Абагинский)	1,192	**selo of Abaga**
Altansky (Алтанский)	814	**selo of Altantsy**
Amgino-Nakharinsky (Амгино-Нахаринский)	628	**selo of Onnyos**; selo of Yefremovo; selo of Tegyulte
Amginsky (Амгинский)	6,533	**selo of Amga** (administrative center of the district)
Betyunsky (Бетюнский)	1,216	**selo of Betyuntsy**; selo of Uoray
Bolugursky (Болугурский)	1,507	**selo of Bolugur**
Maysky (Майский)	682	**selo of Pokrovka**; selo of Bulun
Myandiginsky (Мяндигинский)	435	**selo of Myandigi**
Satagaysky (Сатагайский)	570	**selo of Satagay**
Somorsunsky (Соморсунский)	859	**selo of Mikhaylovka**
Sulgachchinsky (Сулгаччинский)	709	**selo of Sulgachchy**; selo of Serge-Bes
Chakyrsky (Чакырский)	579	**selo of Chakyr 2-y**
Chapchylgansky (Чапчылганский)	862	**selo of Chapchylgan**; selo of Promkombinat
Emissky (Эмисский)	597	**selo of Emissy**; selo of Olom-Kyuyole

*Administrative centers are shown in bold

== Economy ==
Because of the flat terrain and relatively mild summer climate, Amginsky District supports agriculture, primarily livestock, potatoes, fodder crops and timber. There are also deposits of construction materials.

== Demographics ==
As of the 2021 Census, the ethnic composition was as follows:

- Yakuts: 93.4%
- Russians: 3.7%
- Evenks: 1.7%
- others: 1.2%
