= Betyuntsy =

Betyuntsy Бетюнцы
- Selo
- Interactive map of Betyuntsy
- Location of Betyuntsy Betyuntsy (Sakha Republic)
- Coordinates: 60°55′N 132°09′E
- Country: Russia
- Federal subject: Sakha Republic
- Administrative district: Amginsky District
- Rural okrugSelsoviet: Betyunsky Rural Okrug

Population (2010 Census)
  - Total: 1,216
  - Estimate (2021): 1,311 (+7.8%)

Administrative status
  - Capital of: Betyunsky Rural Okrug

Municipal status
  - Municipal district: Amginsky Municipal District
  - Rural settlement: Betyunsky Rural Settlement
  - Capital of: Betyunsky Rural Settlement
- Time zone: UTC+
- Postal code: 678603
- OKTMO ID: 98608440101

Betyuntsy (Russian: Бетюнцы; Yakut: Бөтүҥ, Bötüŋ) is a rural locality (a selo) and the administrative center of Betyunsky Rural Okrug of Amginsky District in the Sakha Republic, Russia, located 9 kilometers (5.6 mi) from Amga, the administrative center of the district. Its population as of the 2010 Census was 1,216; down from 1,255 recorded in the 2002 Census.
