= Emissy =

Emissy Эмиссы
- Selo
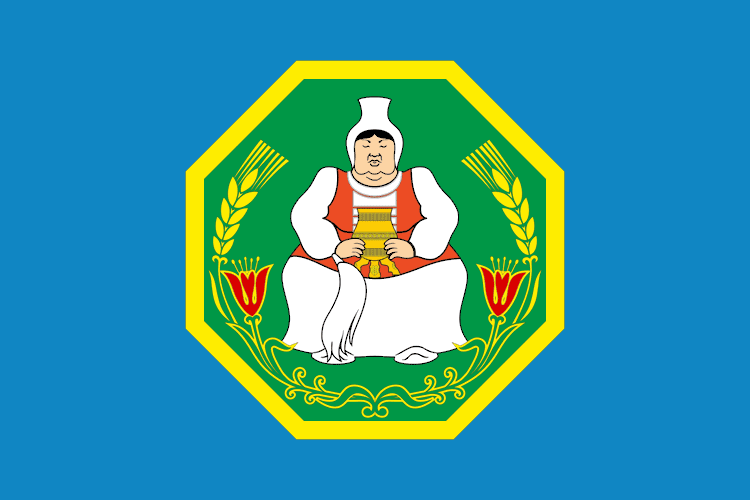
- Flag
- Interactive map of Emissy
- Location of Emissy Emissy (Sakha Republic)
- Coordinates: 61°23′N 131°11′E
- Country: Russia
- Federal subject: Sakha Republic
- Administrative district: Amginsky District
- Rural okrugSelsoviet: Emissky Rural Okrug

Population
  - Estimate (2002): 584 )

Administrative status
  - Capital of: Emissky Rural Okrug

Municipal status
  - Municipal district: Amginsky Municipal District
  - Rural settlement: Emissky Rural Settlement
  - Capital of: Emissky Rural Settlement
- Time zone: UTC+
- Postal code: 678615
- OKTMO ID: 98608481101

Emissy (Russian: Эмиссы; Yakut: Эмис, Emis) is a rural locality (a selo) and the administrative center of Emissky Rural Okrug of Amginsky District in the Sakha Republic, Russia, located 74 kilometers (46 mi) from Amga, the administrative center of the district. Its population as of the 2010 Census was 584; down from 636 recorded in the 2002 Census.
