= Yefremovo, Lezhnevsky District, Ivanovo Oblast =

Yefremovo Ефремово
- Village
- Location within Ivanovo Oblast Location within Russia
- Coordinates: 56°52′N 40°45′E
- Country: Russia
- Region: Ivanovo Oblast
- District: Lezhnevsky District
- Time zone: UTC+3:00

Yefremovo (Russian: Ефремово) is a rural locality (a village) in Lezhnevsky District, Ivanovo Oblast, Russia. Population: 18 (2010 census);

== Geography ==
This rural locality is located 14 kilometres (8.7 mi) from Lezhnevo (the district's administrative centre), 18 kilometres (11 mi) from Ivanovo (capital of Ivanovo Oblast) and 228 kilometres (142 mi) from Moscow. Poptsevo is the nearest rural locality.
