= Onnyos =

Onnyos Оннёс
- Selo
- Interactive map of Onnyos
- Location of Onnyos Onnyos (Sakha Republic)
- Coordinates: 60°28′N 131°05′E
- Country: Russia
- Federal subject: Sakha Republic
- Administrative district: Amginsky District
- Rural okrugSelsoviet: Amgino-Nakharinsky Rural Okrug

Population (2010 Census)
  - Total: 586
  - Estimate (2021): 590 (+0.7%)

Administrative status
  - Capital of: Amgino-Nakharinsky Rural Okrug

Municipal status
  - Municipal district: Amginsky Municipal District
  - Rural settlement: Amgino-Nakharinsky Rural Settlement
  - Capital of: Amgino-Nakharinsky Rural Settlement
- Time zone: UTC+
- Postal code: 678612
- OKTMO ID: 98608429101

Onnyos (Russian: Оннёс; Yakut: Өнньүөс, Önñüös) is a rural locality (a selo) and the administrative center of Amgino-Nakharinsky Rural Okrug of Amginsky District in the Sakha Republic, Russia, located 81 kilometers (50 mi) from Amga, the administrative center of the district. Its population as of the 2010 Census was 586; down from 614 recorded in the 2002 Census.
