= Amga (river) =

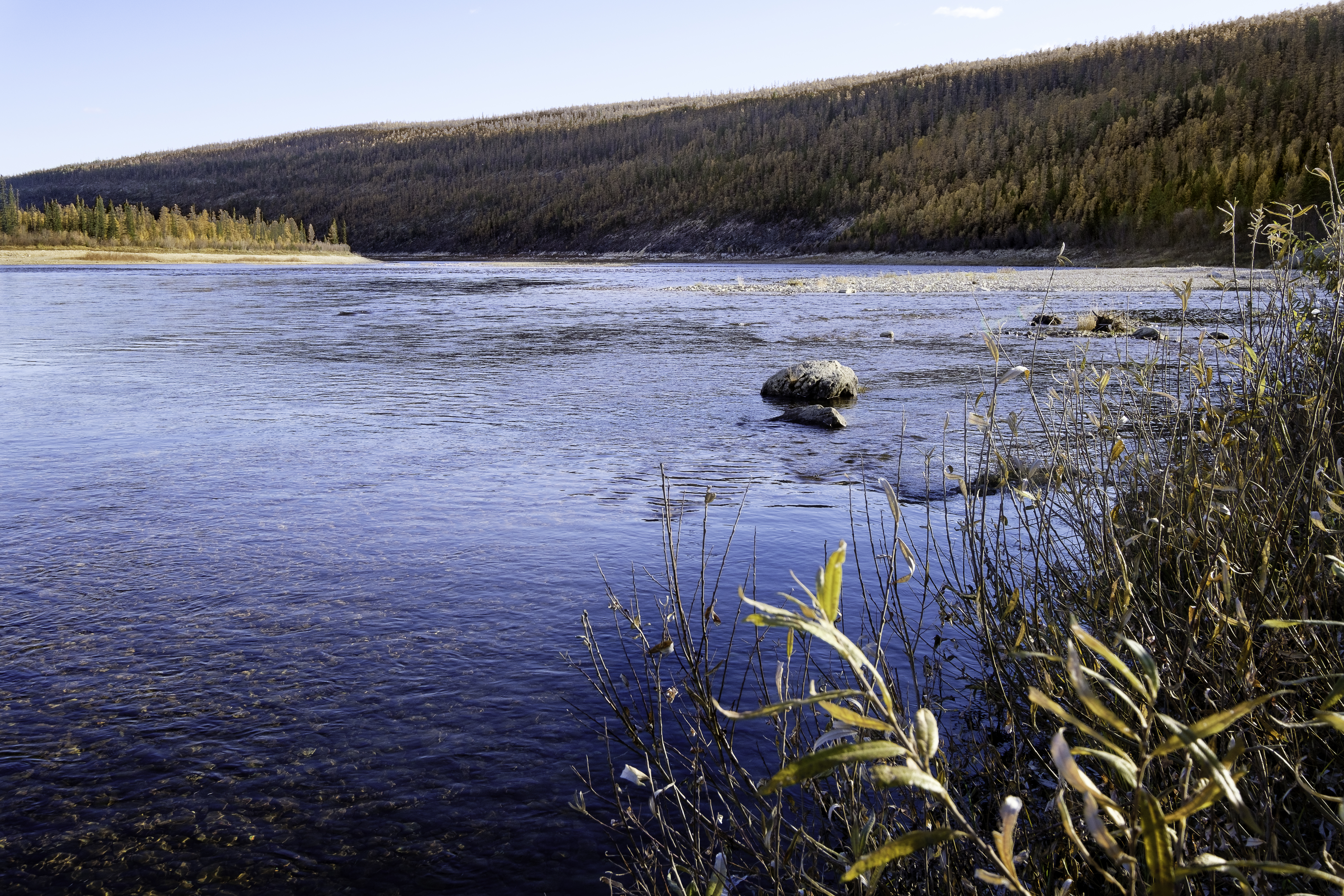
- Amga River near Verkhnyaya Amga

- Location in the Sakha Republic, Russia

Location
- Country: Russia

Physical characteristics
- Source
  - location: Aldan Highlands
- Mouth: Aldan
  - coordinates: 62°37′41″N 134°55′11″E
- Length: 1,462 km (908 mi)
- Basin size: 69,300 km^{2} (26,800 mi^{2})
- Discharge
  - average: 178 m^{3}/s (6,300 cu ft/s)

Basin features
- Progression: Aldan→ Lena→ Laptev Sea

The Amga (Russian: Амга; Yakut: Амма, Amma) is a river in Sakha (Yakutia), Russia. The length of the river is 1,462 kilometres (908 mi). The area of its basin is 69,300 square kilometres (26,800 mi^{2}). The Amga freezes up in the first half of October and stays under the ice until May. Many different kinds of fish can be found in the Amga river.

== Course ==
The river has its source in the Aldan Highlands. It forms the eastern limit of the Lena Plateau. It is the biggest tributary of the Aldan, which it joins on the left bank a few miles west of Khandyga.

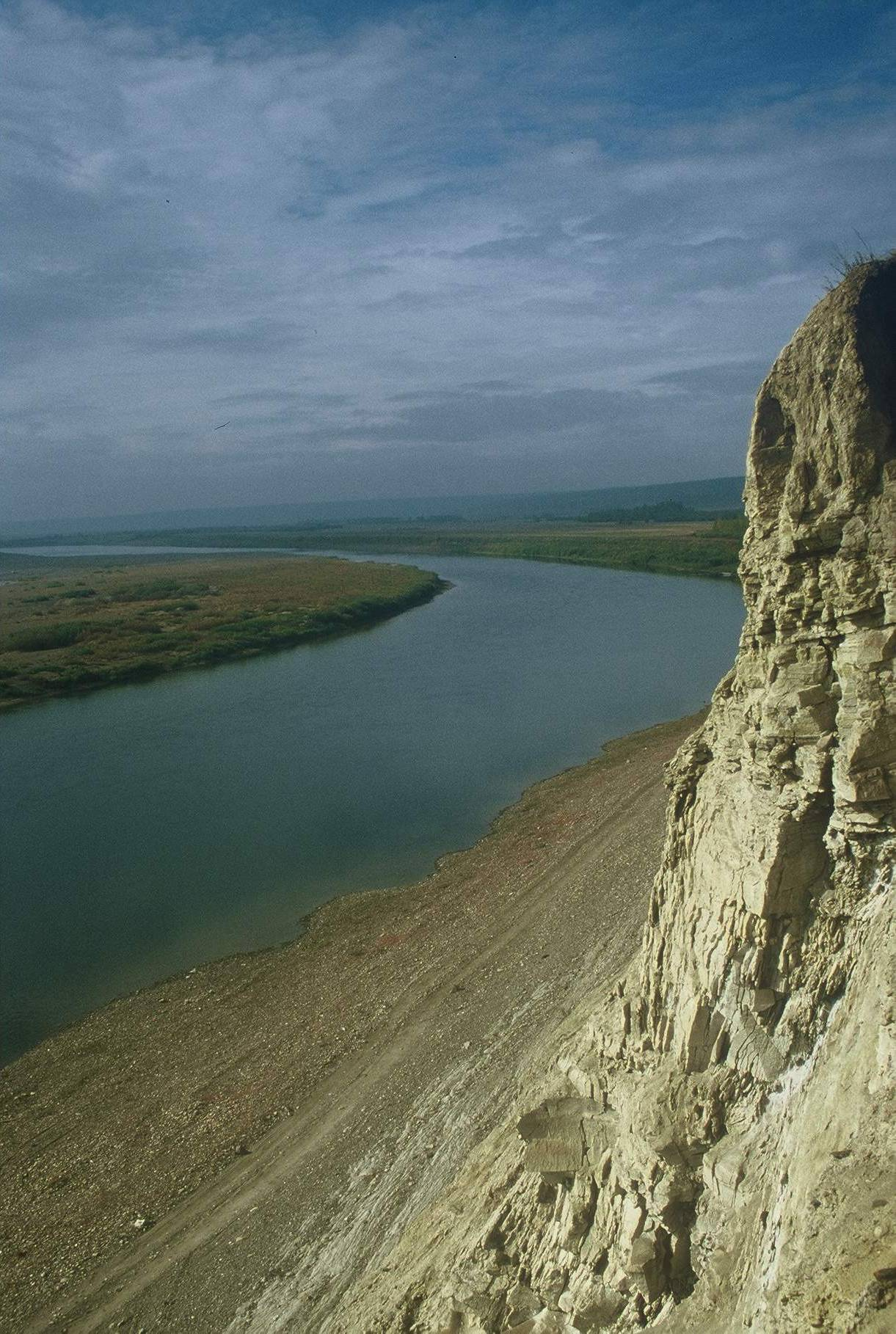
In some stretches river Amga is flanked by pillar-like rock formations.

== See also ==
- List of rivers of Russia
