= Amga (rural locality) =

Amga Амга
- Selo

Other transcription(s)
  - Sakha: Амма
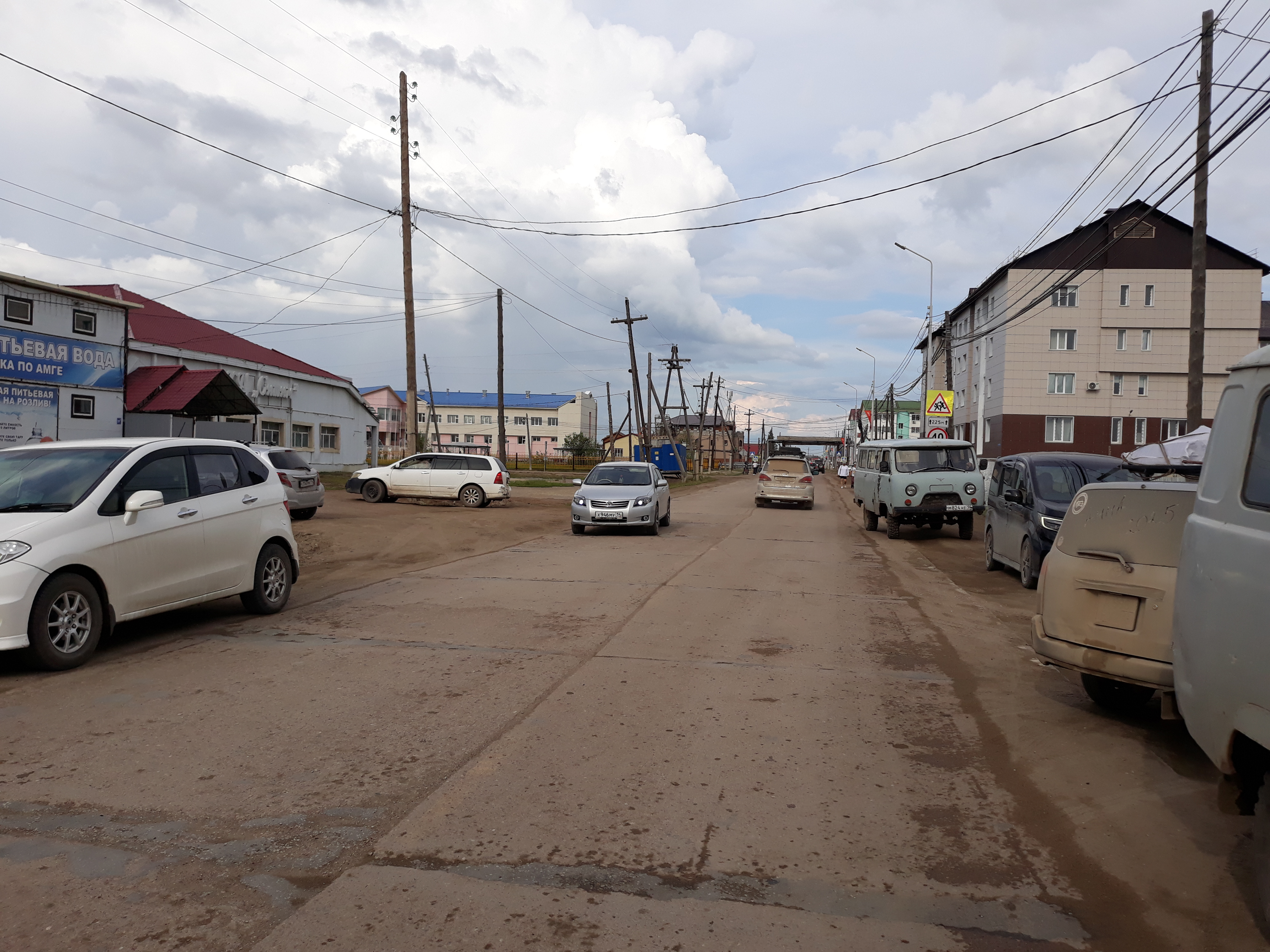
- Amga, 2025.

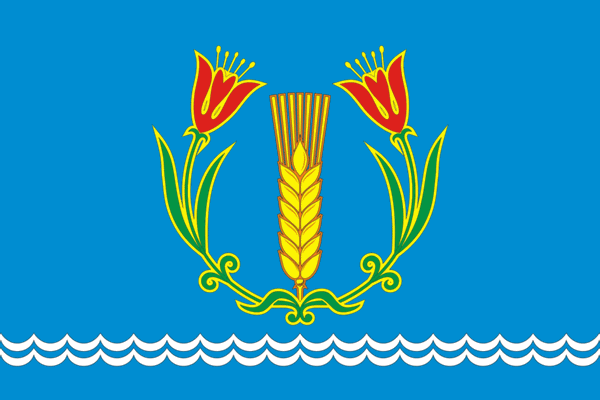
- Flag
- Interactive map of Amga
- Location of Amga Amga (Sakha Republic)
- Coordinates: 60°53′50″N 131°58′50″E
- Country: Russia
- Federal subject: Sakha Republic
- Administrative district: Amginsky District
- Rural okrugSelsoviet: Amginsky Rural Okrug
- Founded: 1652
- Elevation: 159 m (522 ft)

Population (2010 Census)
  - Total: 6,533
  - Estimate (January 2016) (Note: The results of the 2016 estimate are given for Amginsky Rural Settlement, a municipal formation of Amginsky Municipal District. According to Law #173-Z 353-III, Amga is the only inhabited locality on the territory of Amginsky Rural Settlement.): 6,578 (+0.7%)

Administrative status
  - Capital of: Amginsky District, Amginsky Rural Okrug

Municipal status
  - Municipal district: Amginsky Municipal District
  - Rural settlement: Amginsky Rural Settlement
  - Capital of: Amginsky Municipal District, Amginsky Rural Settlement
- Time zone: UTC+
- Postal code: 678600
- Dialing code: +7 41142
- OKTMO ID: 98608432101

Amga (Russian: Амга́; Yakut: Амма, Amma) is a rural locality (a selo) and the administrative center of Amginsky District of the Sakha Republic, Russia. It also the only inhabited locality and the administrative center of Amginsky Rural Okrug within Amginsky District. Population: 6,533 (2010 census); 6,359 (2002 census); 5,191 (1989 Soviet census).

Historical population
| Year | Pop. | ±% |
|---|---|---|
| 1939 | 1,230 | — |
| 1959 | 2,348 | +90.9% |
| 1970 | 3,542 | +50.9% |
| 1979 | 4,103 | +15.8% |
| 1989 | 5,191 | +26.5% |
| 2002 | 6,359 | +22.5% |
| 2010 | 6,533 | +2.7% |
| 2021 | 6,667 | +2.1% |
Source: Census data

== Etymology ==
The name Amga is derived from an Evenk word meaning gorge or ravine.

== Geography ==
Amga is located on the Amga River, a right tributary of the Aldan, part of the Lena basin. The Notora has its sources nearby.

== History ==
It was first founded by the Cossacks in 1652 as the ostrog (fortress) of Amga-Sloboda (Амга-Слобода). The first church was built in 1680, but it burned down later and was subsequently rebuilt a number of times. Agriculture has been conducted in the area since 1695; it was the first place in Yakutia used for growing crops.

Amga was a place of political exile in the Russian Empire, with the most famous exile being Vladimir Korolenko, who was exiled here for six years in 1879.

It was also the site for fighting during the Russian Civil War.

Somewhere in the area was the old river crossing of Amginsk. From about 1750 to 1850, a horse track led northwest to Yakutsk. Across the river, one route led south to Uda Bay and the other went southeast to Ust-Maya and from there south to Ayan. From perhaps 1662, there were a few Russian peasants in the area, but agriculture was usually unsuccessful. In 1737, Stepan Krasheninnikov noted that they had abandoned agriculture and were distinguishable from their Yakut neighbors only in religion.

== Climate ==
Amga has an extreme subarctic climate (Köppen Dfd)

Climate data for Amga
| Month | Jan | Feb | Mar | Apr | May | Jun | Jul | Aug | Sep | Oct | Nov | Dec | Year |
|---|---|---|---|---|---|---|---|---|---|---|---|---|---|
| Record high °C (°F) | −10.0 (14.0) | −4.4 (24.1) | 12.0 (53.6) | 17.6 (63.7) | 32.0 (89.6) | 35.2 (95.4) | 38.2 (100.8) | 35.0 (95.0) | 31.1 (88.0) | 16.0 (60.8) | 2.0 (35.6) | −2.8 (27.0) | 38.2 (100.8) |
| Mean daily maximum °C (°F) | −35.6 (−32.1) | −30.6 (−23.1) | −13.3 (8.1) | 1.4 (34.5) | 13.1 (55.6) | 22.3 (72.1) | 25.0 (77.0) | 21.6 (70.9) | 11.6 (52.9) | −4.1 (24.6) | −23.6 (−10.5) | −34.0 (−29.2) | −1.9 (28.6) |
| Daily mean °C (°F) | −39.4 (−38.9) | −36.2 (−33.2) | −22.7 (−8.9) | −6.3 (20.7) | 7.0 (44.6) | 15.4 (59.7) | 18.2 (64.8) | 14.5 (58.1) | 5.4 (41.7) | −9.0 (15.8) | −28.2 (−18.8) | −37.9 (−36.2) | −8.1 (17.4) |
| Mean daily minimum °C (°F) | −44.5 (−48.1) | −42.9 (−45.2) | −33.0 (−27.4) | −15.9 (3.4) | −1.1 (30.0) | 6.4 (43.5) | 9.6 (49.3) | 6.4 (43.5) | −1.4 (29.5) | −15.4 (4.3) | −34.2 (−29.6) | −43.0 (−45.4) | −15.8 (3.6) |
| Record low °C (°F) | −60.0 (−76.0) | −60.0 (−76.0) | −52.2 (−62.0) | −42.2 (−44.0) | −15.0 (5.0) | −5.7 (21.7) | −6.0 (21.2) | −8.1 (17.4) | −18.4 (−1.1) | −42.6 (−44.7) | −57.2 (−71.0) | −58.9 (−74.0) | −60.0 (−76.0) |
| Average precipitation mm (inches) | 8.7 (0.34) | 8.8 (0.35) | 19.2 (0.76) | 15.4 (0.61) | 38.9 (1.53) | 45.7 (1.80) | 54.1 (2.13) | 51.4 (2.02) | 42.9 (1.69) | 42.3 (1.67) | 16.9 (0.67) | 8.8 (0.35) | 353.1 (13.90) |
| Average precipitation days | 17.1 | 14.1 | 10.5 | 7.4 | 10.0 | 8.5 | 8.0 | 9.0 | 11.5 | 18.6 | 21.3 | 16.7 | 152.7 |

== Sources ==
- "Amginsky District". Registry of the Administrative-Territorial Divisions of the Sakha Republic (in Russian). Official website of the Sakha Republic. Archived from the original on April 26, 2017.
- Государственное Собрание (Ил Тумэн) Республики Саха (Якутия). Закон №173-З №353-III от 30 ноября 2004 г. «Об установлении границ и о наделении статусом городского и сельского поселений муниципальных образований Республики Саха (Якутия)», в ред. Закона №1058-З №1007-IV от 25 апреля 2012 г. «О внесении изменений в Закон Республики Саха (Якутия) "Об установлении границ и о наделении статусом городского и сельского поселений муниципальных образований Республики Саха (Якутия)"». Вступил в силу со дня официального опубликования. Опубликован: "Якутия", №245, 31 декабря 2004 г. (State Assembly (Il Tumen) of the Sakha (Yakutia) Republic. Law #173-Z No. 353-III of November 30, 2004 On Establishing the Borders and on Granting the Urban and Rural Settlement Status to the Municipal Formations of the Sakha (Yakutia) Republic, as amended by the Law #1058-Z No. 1007-IV of April 25, 2012 On Amending the Law of the Sakha (Yakutia) Republic "On Establishing the Borders and on Granting the Urban and Rural Settlement Status to the Municipal Formations of the Sakha (Yakutia) Republic". Effective as of the day of the official publication.).
