= Verkhny Landekh =

Verkhny Landekh Верхний Ландех
- Work settlement
- Interactive map of Verkhny Landekh
- Location of Verkhny Landekh Verkhny Landekh (Ivanovo Oblast)
- Coordinates: 56°50′25″N 42°35′48″E
- Country: Russia
- Federal subject: Ivanovo Oblast
- Administrative district: Verkhnelandekhovsky District

Population (2010 Census)
  - Total: 2,027
  - Estimate (2025): 1,551 (−23.5%)

Administrative status
  - Capital of: Verkhnelandekhovsky District

Municipal status
  - Municipal district: Verkhnelandekhovsky Municipal District
  - Urban settlement: Verkhnelandekhovskoye Urban Settlement
  - Capital of: Verkhnelandekhovsky Municipal District, Verkhnelandekhovskoye Urban Settlement
- Time zone: UTC+3 (MSK)
- Postal code: 155210
- OKTMO ID: 24602151051

Verkhny Landekh (Russian: Ве́рхний Ла́ндех) is an urban locality (urban-type settlement) and the administrative center of Verkhnelandekhovsky District of Ivanovo Oblast, Russia. Population: 1,633 (2021 census); 2,027 (2010 census); 2,080 (2002 census); 2,206 (1989 Soviet census).

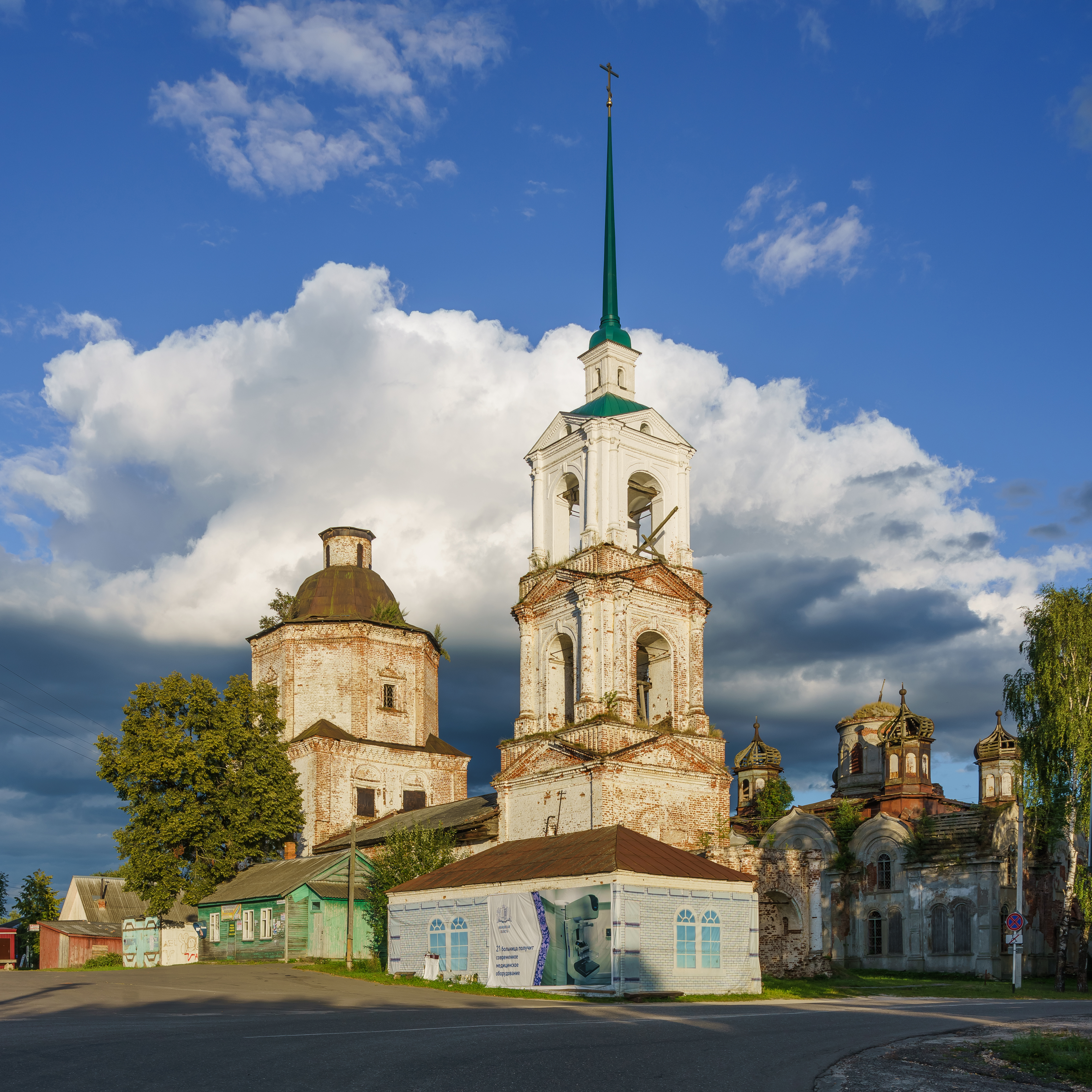
Churches in Verkhny Landekh

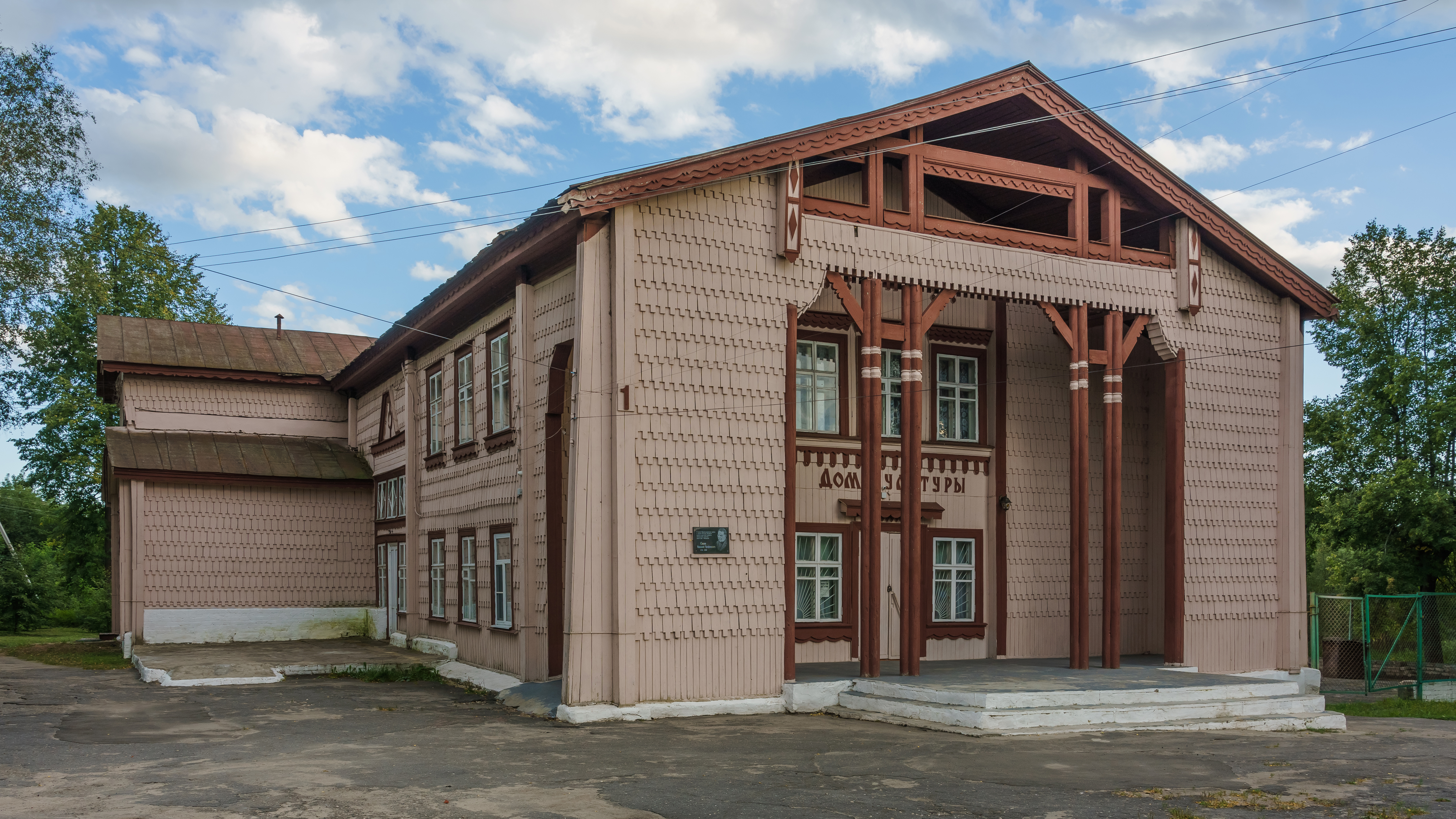
House of Culture

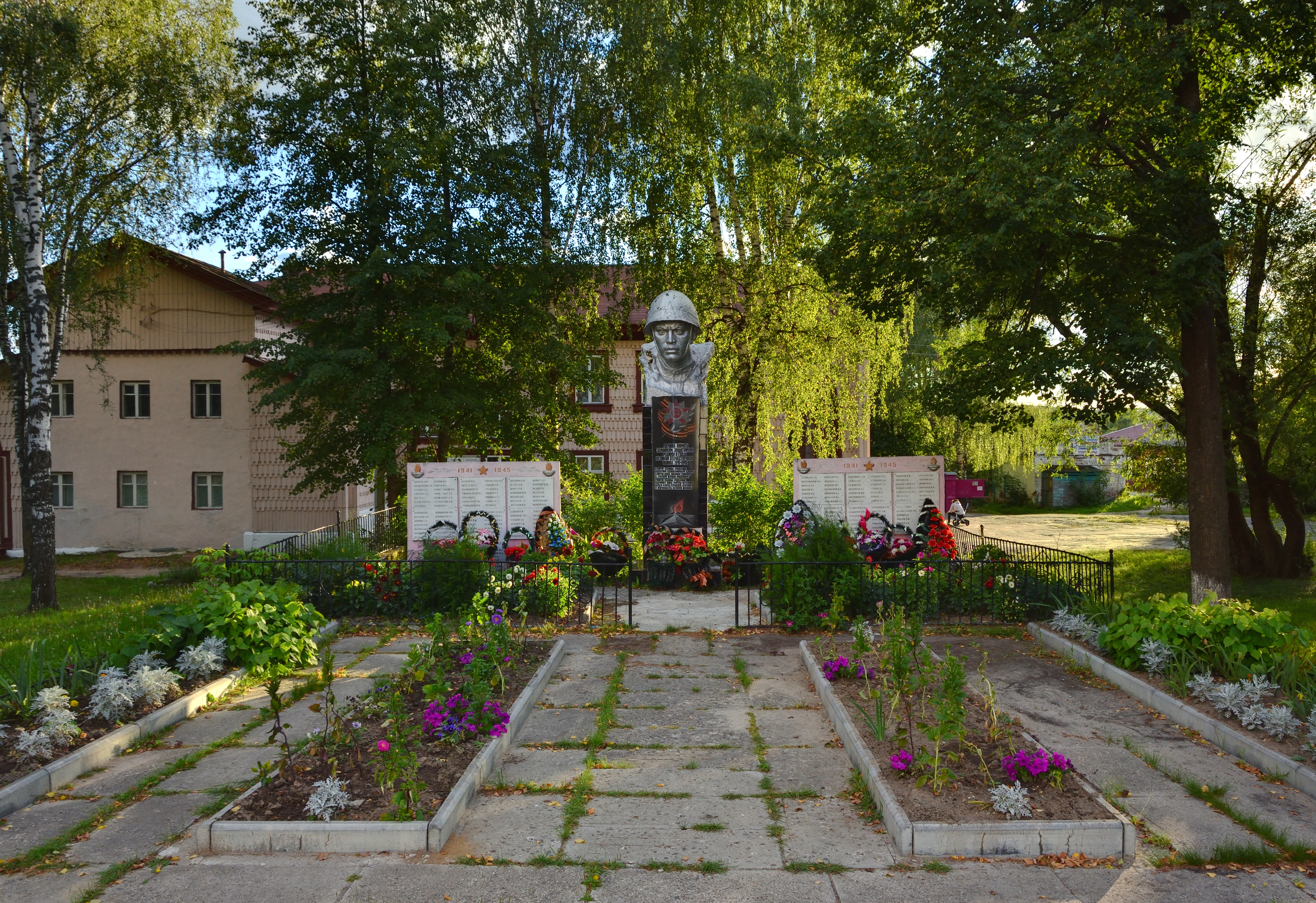
World War II memorial

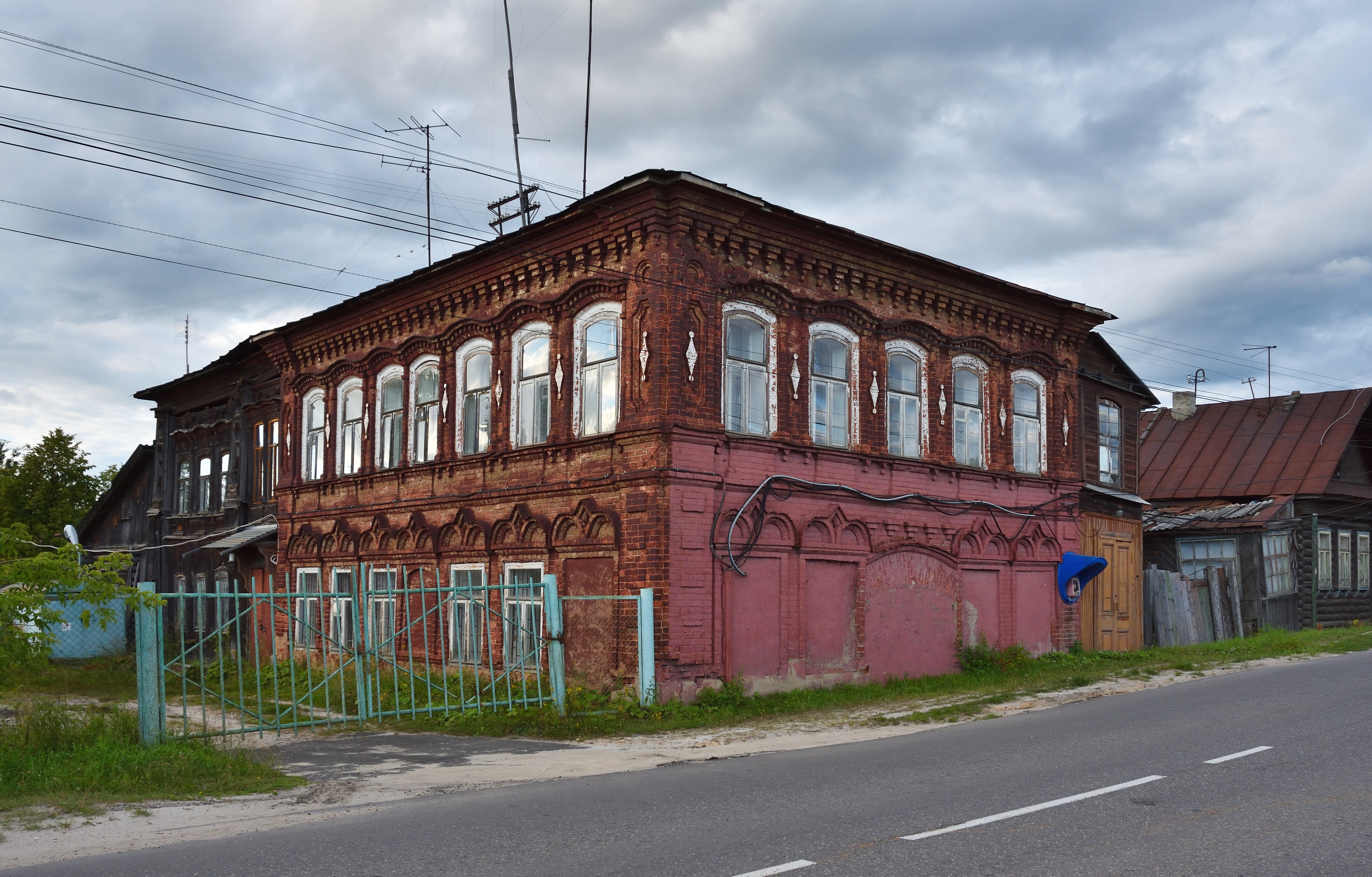
Listed building
