= Verkhnelandekhovsky District =

Verkhnelandekhovsky District Верхнеландеховский район (Russian)
- District
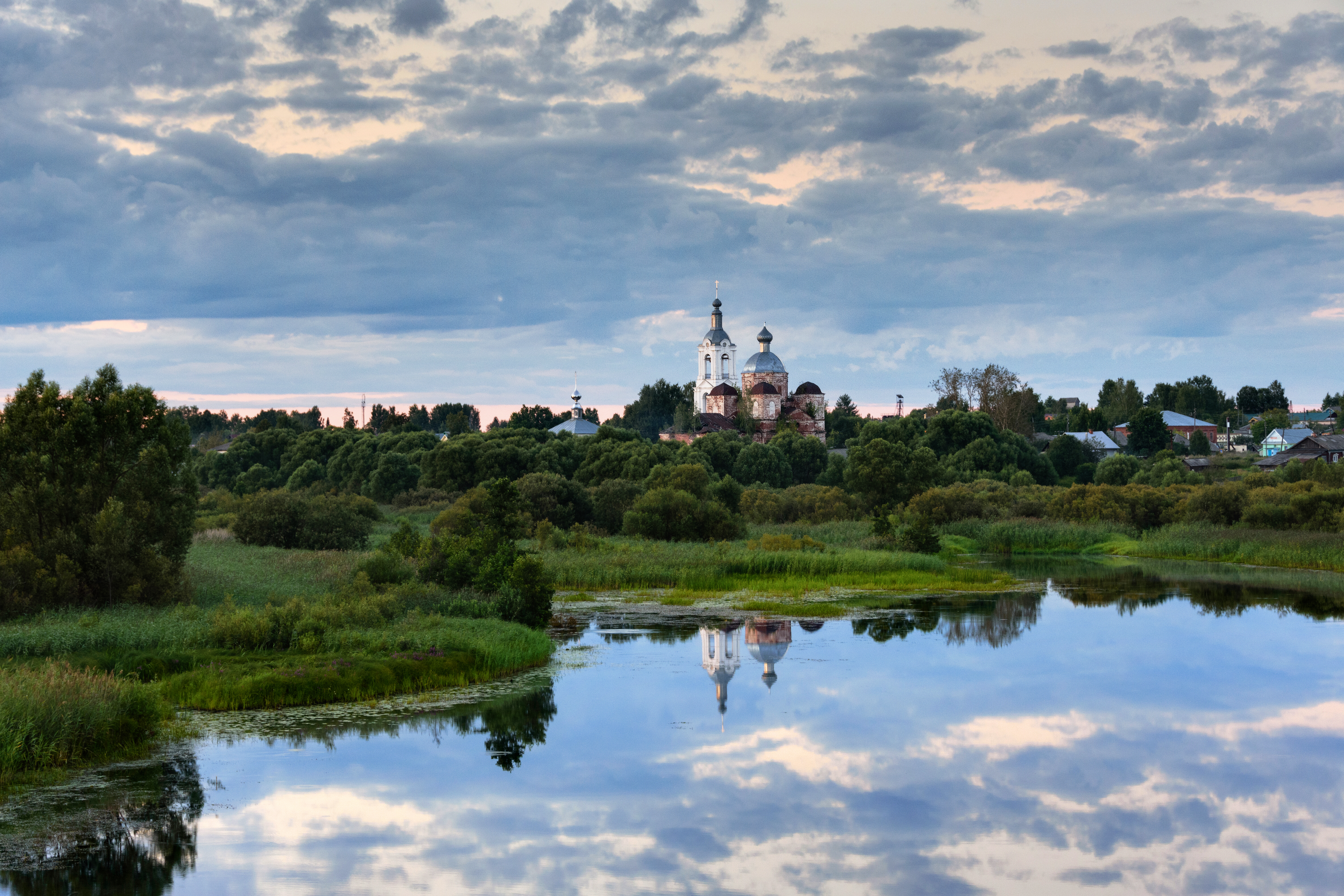
- Churches in the village of Myt, Verkhnelandekhovsky District

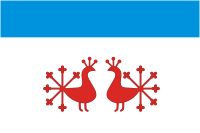
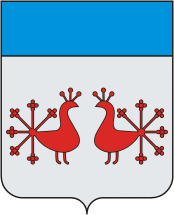
- Flag Coat of arms
- Location of Verkhnelandekhovsky District in Ivanovo Oblast
- Coordinates: 56°50′N 42°35′E
- Country: Russia
- Federal subject: Ivanovo Oblast
- Administrative center: Verkhny Landekh

Area
  - Total: 610 km^{2} (240 sq mi)

Population (2010 Census)
  - Total: 5,348
  - Density: 8.8/km^{2} (23/sq mi)
  - Urban: 37.9%
  - Rural: 62.1%

Administrative structure
  - Inhabited localities: 124 rural localities

Municipal structure
  - Municipally incorporated as: Verkhnelandekhovsky Municipal District
  - Municipal divisions: 1 urban settlements, 3 rural settlements
- Time zone: UTC+3 (MSK)
- OKTMO ID: 24602000
- Website: http://www.vlandeh-admin.ru/

Verkhnelandekhovsky District (Russian: Verkhnelandekhovsky District) is an administrative and municipal district (raion), one of the twenty-one in Ivanovo Oblast, Russia. It is located in the east of the oblast. The area of the district is 610 square kilometers (240 sq mi). Its administrative center is the urban locality (a settlement) of Verkhny Landekh. Population: 4,149 (2021 census); 5,348 (2010 census); 5,631 (2002 Census); 6,838 (1989 Soviet census). The population of Verkhny Landekh accounts for 39.4% of the district's total population.
