= List of single-source gemstones =

List of gemstones that can primarily be found in one geographical location

Single-source gemstones (also referred to as single-location or one-source gemstomes) are gemstones that can primarily be found in a single geographical location. This typically means they are considered very valuable, and are often highly sought after for high-end jewelry.

== List ==
=== Tanzanite ===
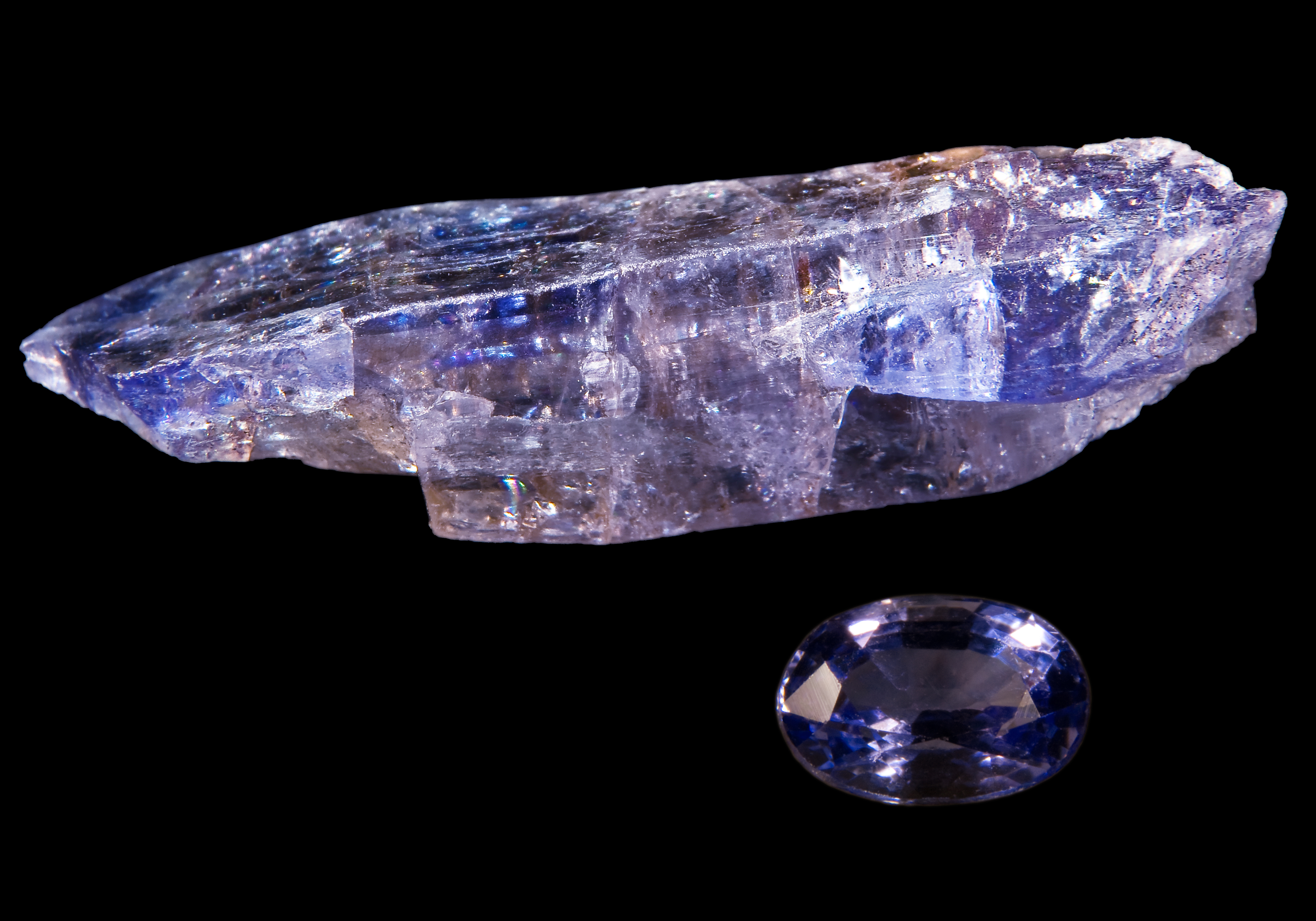
A rough and cut gemstone of tanzanite

Tanzanite is the blue and violet variety of the mineral zoisite, getting its unique color from small amounts of Vanadium. It's mined in an area only 4 km wide and 2 km long at the base of Mount Kilimanjaro in the Manyara Region of Tanzania.

=== Charoite ===
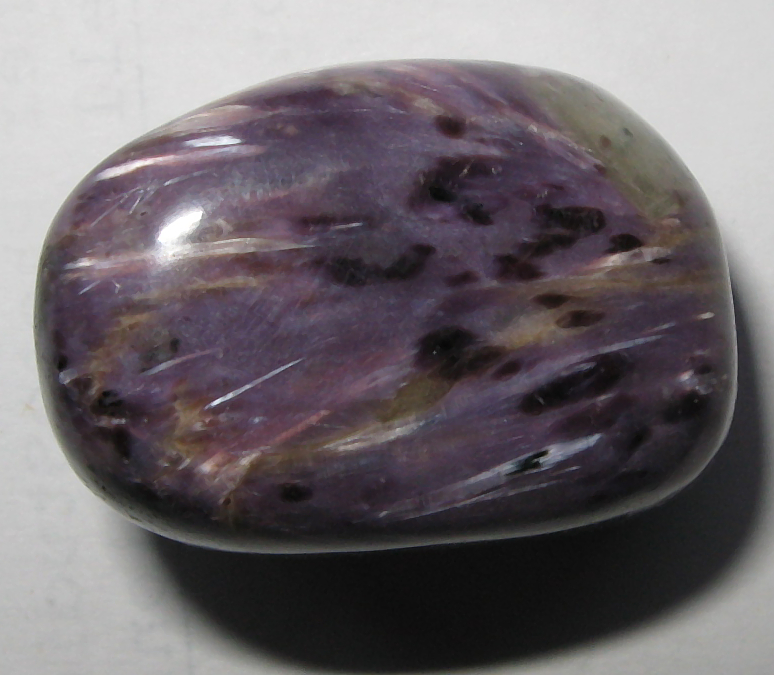
Tumble-polished stone of charoite

Charoite is a rare silicate mineral found exclusively in the Sakha Republic region of Siberia, Russia. It forms naturally with swirling patterns of purple, and often has inclusions of black aegirine and commonly forms with canasite and tinaksite. The stone was named after the Chara River, a river over 70 km away but a favorite of one of the geologists who first discovered it. No proper synthetic alternatives exist, but there are two manufactured materials intended to simulate real charoite, one of which is often marketed as "royal russianite".

=== Moldavite ===
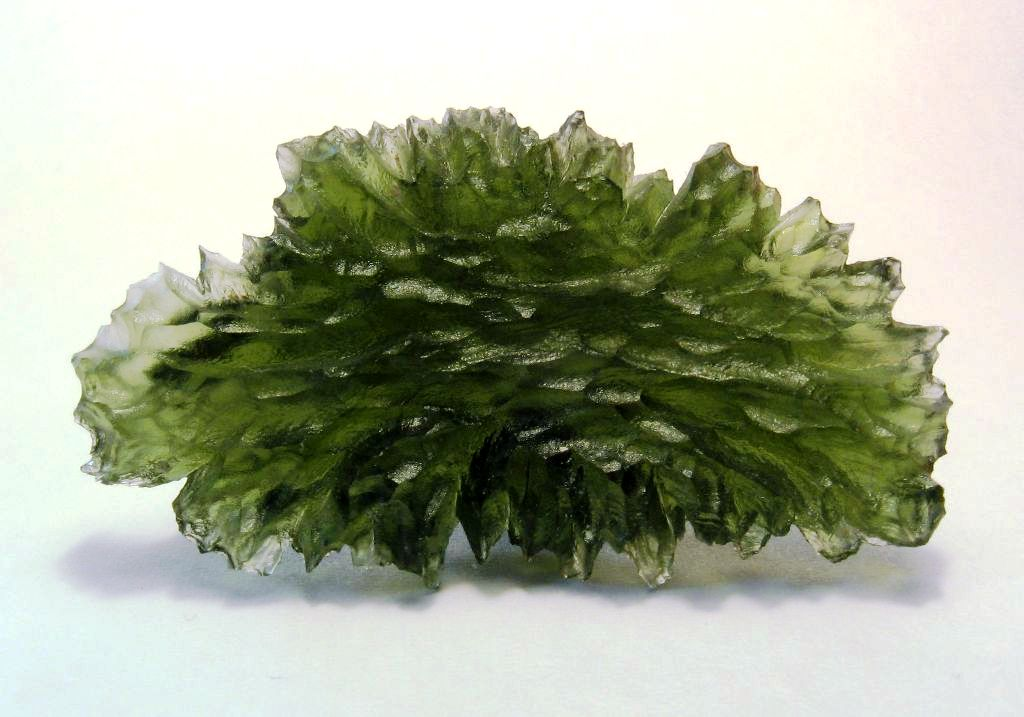
A moldavite specimen from Besednice, Czech Republic. The specimen weighs 11 g (0.39 oz) and is about 46 mm (1.8 in) wide.

Moldavite (Czech: vltavín) is a forest green, olive green or blue greenish vitreous silica projectile glass formed by a meteorite impact in southern Germany (Nördlinger Ries Crater) that occurred about 15 million years ago. Material ejected from the impact crater includes moldavite, which was strewn across parts of Germany, the Czech Republic and Austria. Similar to other single-source gemstones, moldavite is the subject of many counterfeiting businesses for sale to tourists. This is especially true as the scarcity and cost of moldavite goes up over time as its original supply dwindles. It's estimated that only a few hundred tons of moldavite may have been created from the original impact.

=== Ametrine ===
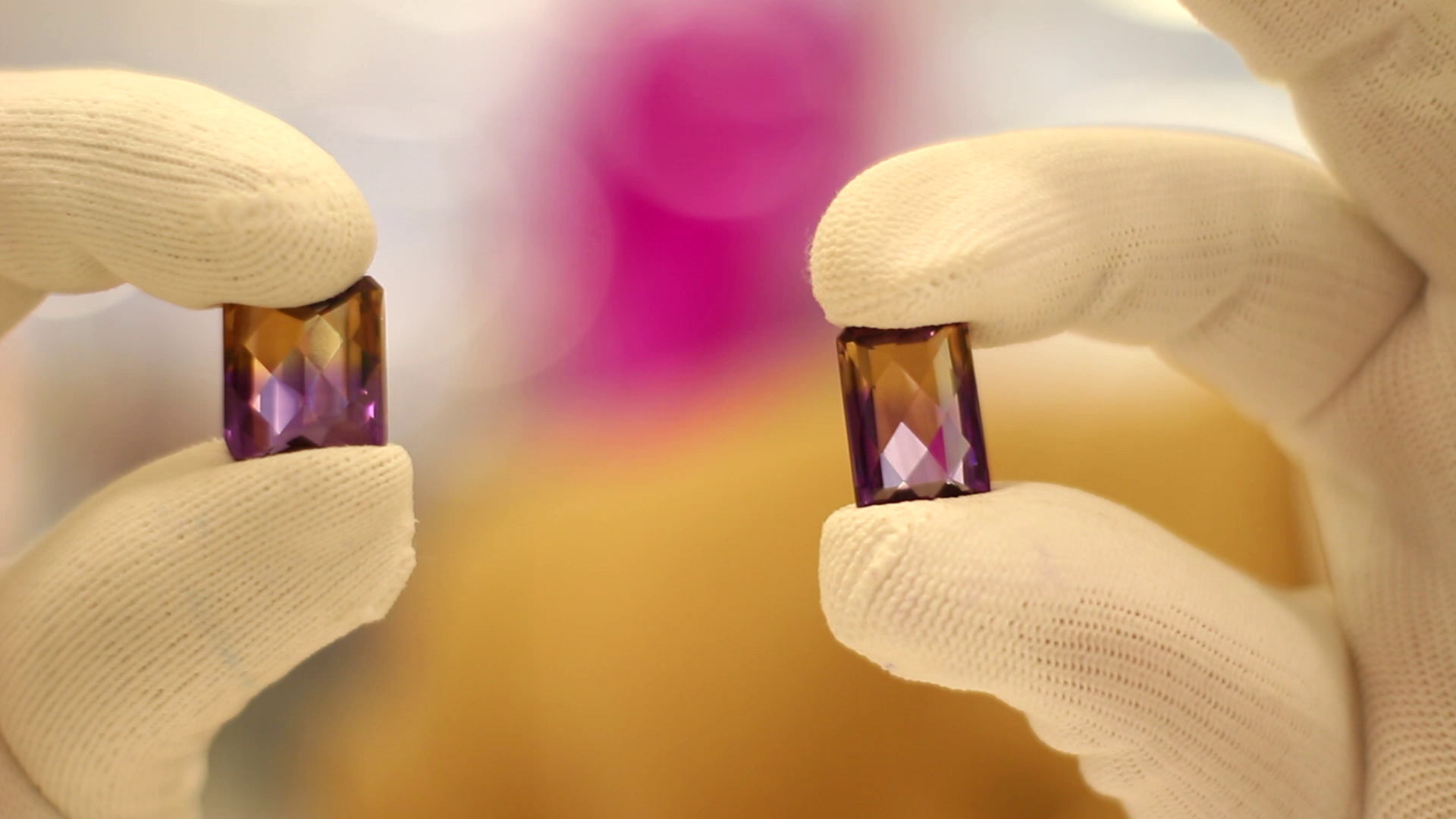
Two stones of ametrine

Ametrine, also known as trystine, golden amethyst, or its trade name bolivianite, is a quartz variety that includes alternating bands of purple and yellowish-orange. This gives it its name, which is a portmanteau of amethyst and citrine. Gem-quality ametrine is sourced almost exclusively from a single site in Bolivia. A Russian laboratory first managed to synthesize artificial ametrine in 1999.

=== Larimar ===
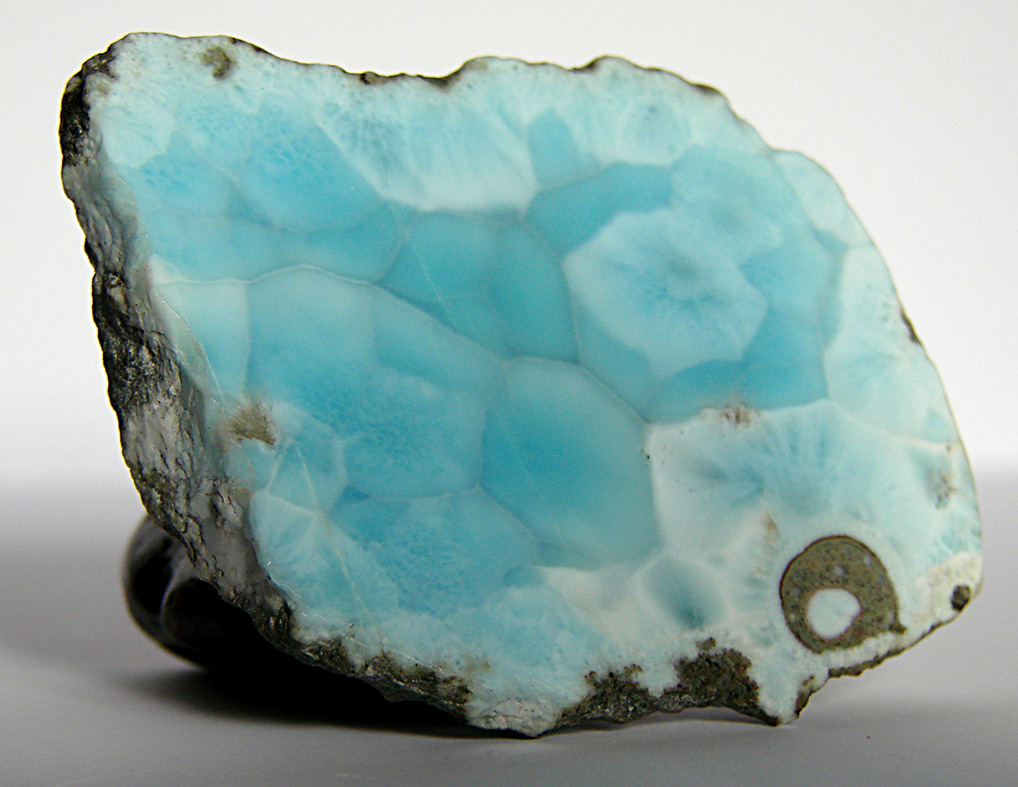
A stone of larimar

Larimar is the tradename for blue pectolite, a blue, white, and grey mineral found only in the Baoruco province of the Dominican Republic. It was first discovered in 1974 when Norman Rilling, a Peace Corps volunteer, found some small worn-down blue stones in the sediment on the side of the Bahoruco River. These were then traced upstream to the single mine where larimar is now sourced. By 1975 the gemstone was already circulating in the domestic market before eventually circulating internationally. The original given name for larimar was "travelina", but in 1975 the sole domestic distributor, Miguel Mendez, coined it larimar after "Lari", a nickname for his daughter, and mar, meaning "sea" in Spanish.

=== Painite ===
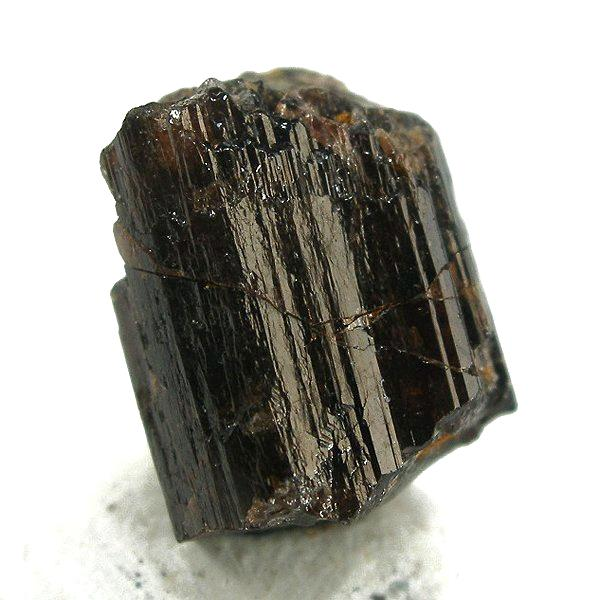
An unpolished stone of painite

Painite is a rare borate mineral. It was first discovered in Myanmar by British mineralogist and gem dealer Arthur C.D. Pain who misidentified it as ruby, until it was discovered as a new gemstone in the 1950s. When it was confirmed as a new mineral species, the mineral was named after him. Painite was listed by Guinness World Records as the world's rarest gem from 1981 to 2005. Until 2005 only two specimens had ever been discovered until areas were discovered that yielded thousands of crystals. Still, due to its overall rarity the number of full crystals and faceted specimens remains rare, and it still hasn't been found outside of distinct regions in Myanmar.

== See also ==
- List of individual gemstones
- List of gemstones by species
