= Olyokma (disambiguation) =

Olyokma may refer to:

- Olyokma river, a tributary of the Lena, Russia
- Olyokma-Stanovik, a system of mountain ranges in Zabaykalsky Krai, Russia
- Olyokma-Chara Plateau, a plateau in the Russian Far East
- Olyokma, Amur Oblast, a rural locality in Amur Oblast, Russia
- Olyokma Nature Reserve, a protected area in the Russian Far East
