= Stanovoy Range =

Mountain range in Sakha Republic, Russia

- Outer Khingan
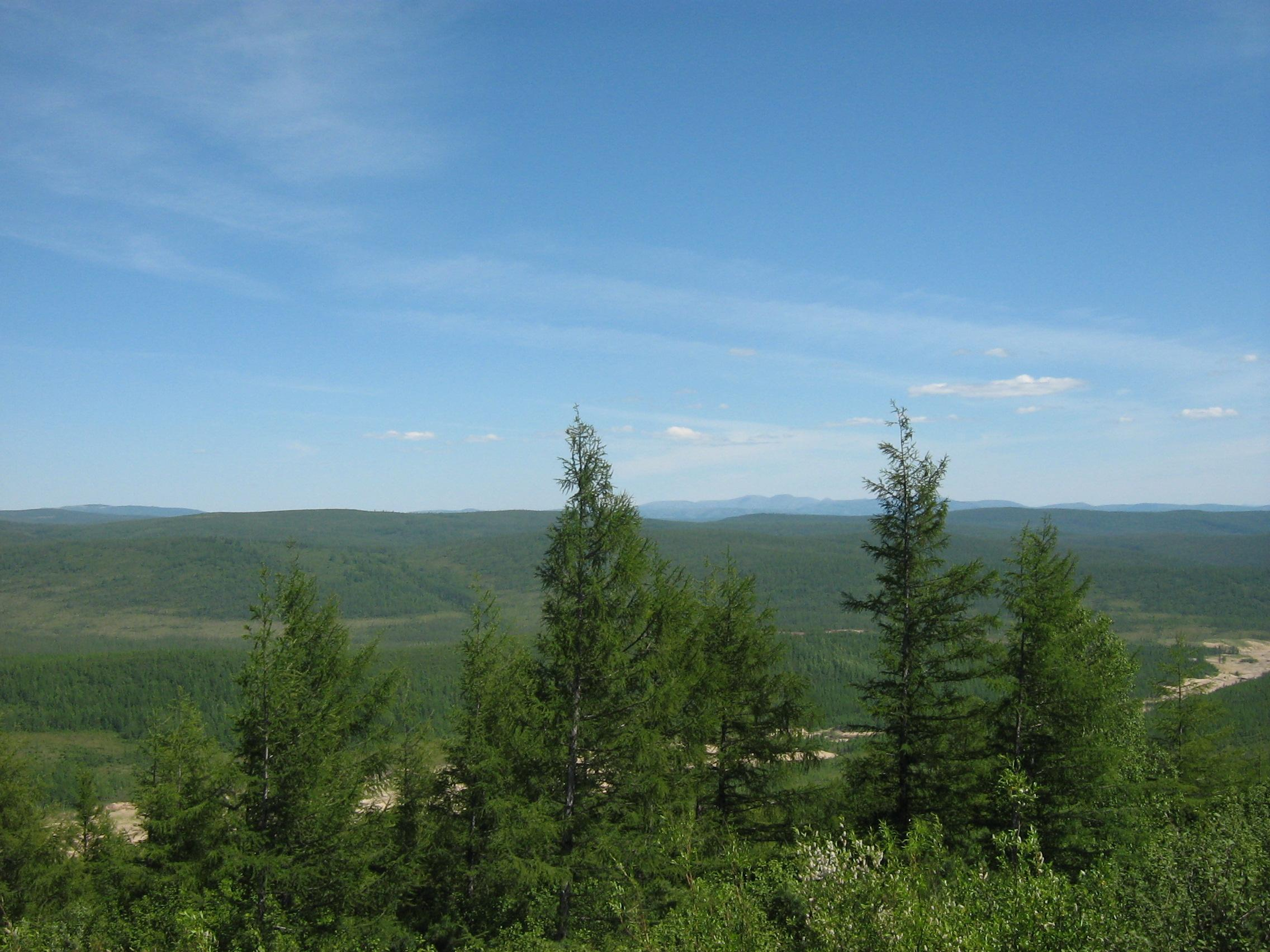
- View of some larch woods in the range.

Highest point
- Peak: Skalisty Golets
- Elevation: 2,412 meters (7,913 ft)
- Coordinates: 55°51′N 130°43′E

Dimensions
- Length: 720 km (450 mi) SW/NE
- Width: 180 km (110 mi) NW/SE

Geography
- Location within Far Eastern Federal District

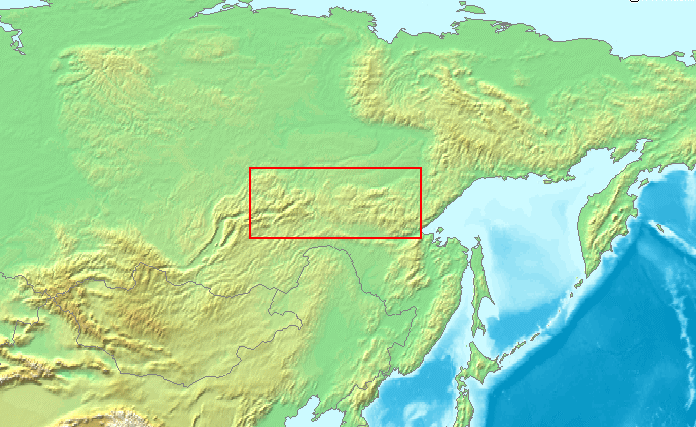
- Location in the Sakha Republic (Yakutia)
- Country: Russia
- Federal subject: Sakha Republic and Amur Oblast
- Range coordinates: 56°20′N 126°00′E
- Parent range: South Siberian Mountains

Geology
- Rock types: Shale; gneiss; granite intrusions

The Stanovoy Range (Russian: Станово́й хребе́т, Stanovoy khrebet; Yakut: Сир кура) is a mountain range located in the Sakha Republic and Amur Oblast, Far Eastern Federal District. It is also known as Sükebayatur and Sükhbaatar in Mongolian, or the Stanovoy Mountains or Outer Khingan Range in English. The range was first studied and scientifically described by Russian researcher Alexander von Middendorff.

== History ==
The range previously formed the border between the Tsardom of Russia (modern-day Russia) and the Qing Dynasty (modern-day China). Russia reached this frontier in the 17th century during the Russian conquest of Siberia, and the border was finalized in 1689 through the Treaty of Nerchinsk. The territory was later ceded to Russia in 1858 under the Treaty of Aigun, which is widely regarded as an unequal treaty.

== Etymology ==
The Evenks grouped the Dzhugdzhur, Stanovoy, and Yablonoi ranges under the name "Dzhugdzhur". In Evenk folklore this mountain system is known as the "backbone of the Earth".

== Geography ==
The range runs roughly from west to east at the southern end of the Sakha Republic and the northern limit of Amur Oblast for roughly 700 kilometers (430 mi). It is bound by the Olyokma River in the west (which separates it from the Stanovoy Highlands to the west) and the Uchur River in the east (which separates it from the Dzhugdzhur Range in Khabarovsk Krai to the east). The Aldan Highlands are located to the north of the eastern part of the range and the Olyokma-Chara Plateau to the northwest. The Yankan – Tukuringra – Soktakhan – Dzhagdy group of mountain ranges rise to the south and the Maya Range to the southeast.

The highest point of the range is Skalisty Golets, a ‘’golets’’-type mountain with a bald peak, at 2,412 meters (7,913 ft).

=== Hydrography ===
The Stanovoy Range separates the watershed of the Arctic Ocean (basin of the Lena) from that of the Pacific Ocean (Amur basin). The range has many glaciers, which are among the main sources of the Lena. Rivers Maya and Timpton have their sources in the range. The Zeya has its sources in the Toko-Stanovik subrange located at the eastern end.

== See also ==
- List of mountains and hills of Russia
