= Skalisty =

Skalisty is a Russian language word meaning rocky and may refer to:

- Cape Skalisty, near Odyan Bay in the Sea of Okhotsk
- Pik Skalisty, Tajikistan
- Pik Skalisty (Kyrgyzstan)
- Pik Skalisty (Chukotka)
- Skalisty Golets, Kalar Range, Transbaikalia, Russian Far East
- Skalisty Golets (Stanovoy Range), Yakutia
- Skalisty Range, Caucasus
- Skalisty Range, Yakutia
- The former name of Gadzhiyevo, Murmansk Oblast, Russia
- An island in the Valaam archipelago, Lake Ladoga, Russia
