= Aldan Highlands =

Mountain range in Russia

- Алданское нагорье / Алдан үрдэлэ
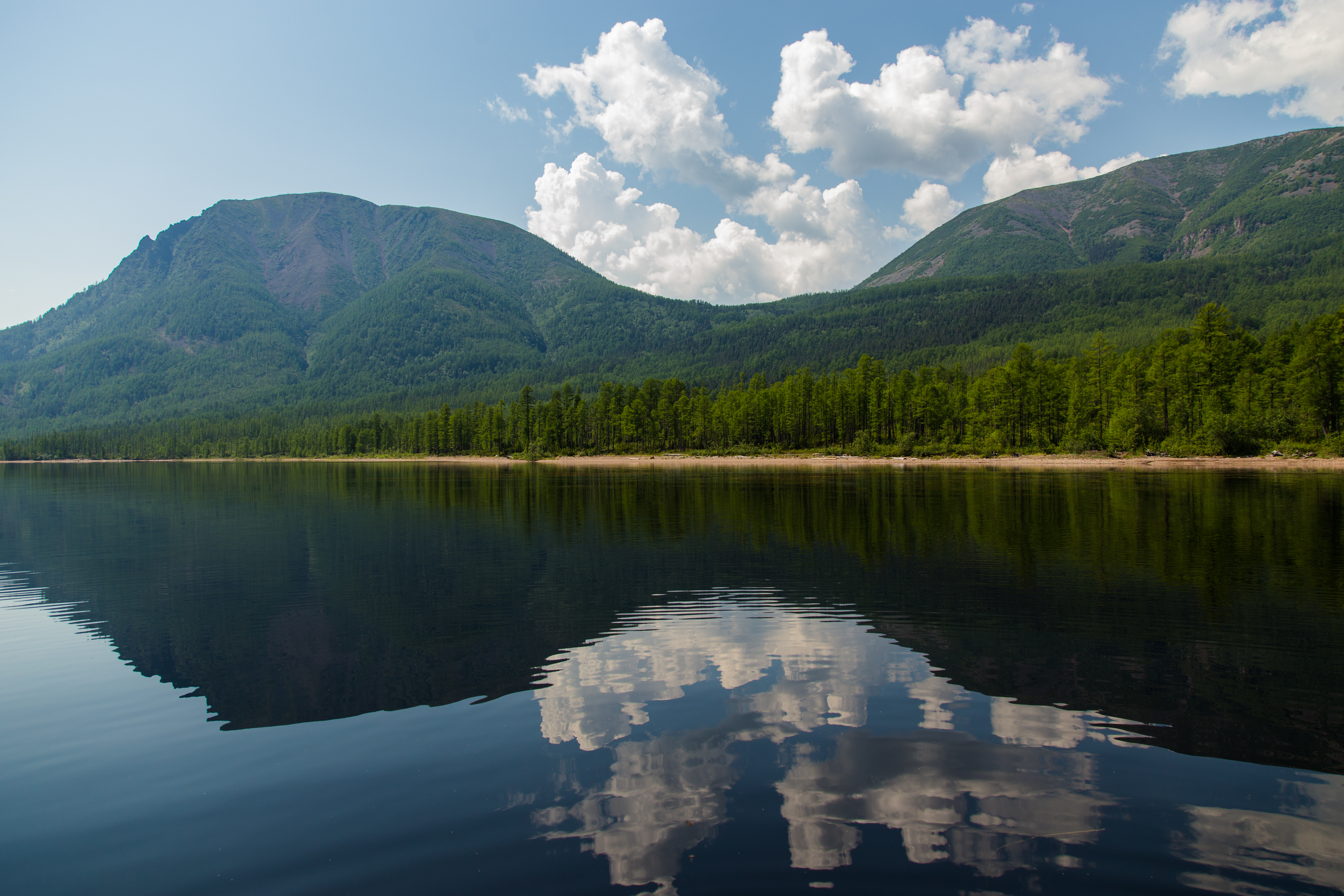
- View of Lake Bolshoye Toko

Highest point
- Peak: Mount Ningam
- Elevation: 2,306 m (7,566 ft)

Dimensions
- Length: 600 km (370 mi)
- Width: 300 km (190 mi)

Geography
- Location within Sakha Republic
- Country: Russia
- Federal subject: Sakha Republic
- Range coordinates: 57°0′N 128°0′E
- Parent range: South Siberian System

Geology
- Rock ages: Precambrian and Late Archaean
- Rock types: Gneiss, slate, Granulite and amphibolite

Climbing
- Easiest route: from Aldan

The Aldan Highlands, or Aldan Plateau (Russian: Алданское нагорье, romanized: Aldanskoye Nagorye; Yakut: Алдан үрдэлэ) are a mountainous area in the Sakha Republic, Far Eastern Federal District, Russia. Aldan town and Tommot are located in the northern area of the highlands and Chulman in the south.

The Olyokma Nature Reserve is a protected area located on the northwestern side, partly within the neighboring Lena Plateau.

== History ==
The area of the Aldan and the Yudoma-Maya highlands, between the basins of the Aldan River and the Yudoma, was uncharted territory well until the 1930s. It was first surveyed in 1934 by geologist Yuri Bilibin (1901—1952) together with mining engineer Evgeny Bobin (1897—1941) in the course of an expedition sent by the government of the USSR. Bilibin and Bobin made a thorough topographic survey of the mountainous region leading separate research parties.

== Geography ==
The Aldan Highlands are located at the southern end of the Sakha Republic, between the Aldan River and the Uchur River, a right tributary of the Aldan. The Aldan partly crosses the uplands in the north, in the same manner as the Amga River in the west. The highlands are limited by the Stanovoy Range to the southwest, and by its Toko-Stanovik subrange to the south and southeast. In the west the Olyokma River marks the limit, beyond which lies the Olyokma-Chara Plateau. The Dzhugdzhur Range rises to the east of the highlands.

The highest point of the Aldan Highlands is Mount Ningam (Гора Нингам), a 2,287 metres (7,503 ft) high peak located in the southern part, rising above the basin of the Gonam River, a left tributary of the Uchur. The same mountain is 2,306 metres (7,566 ft) high according to other sources.

=== Subranges ===
The system of the Aldan Highlands comprises a number of subranges where mountains are generally of middle height and their relief usually smooth. The highest point is an unnamed 2,306 m (7,566 ft) summit. The ranges within the uplands include the following:

- Western Yangi Range, highest point Mount Evota 1,603 metres (5,259 ft)
- Sunnagyn Range (Aldan-Uchur), highest point 2,246 metres (7,369 ft)
- Ket-Kap Range, highest point 1,493 metres (4,898 ft)
- Tommot Range, highest point 1,616 metres (5,302 ft)

=== Hydrography ===
Besides the Aldan and the Amga, the rivers of the highlands include the Buotama, the Amedichi, the Elkon, the Ulu, the Bolshoy Nimnyr, the Yungyuele, the Timpton and the Tuolba.

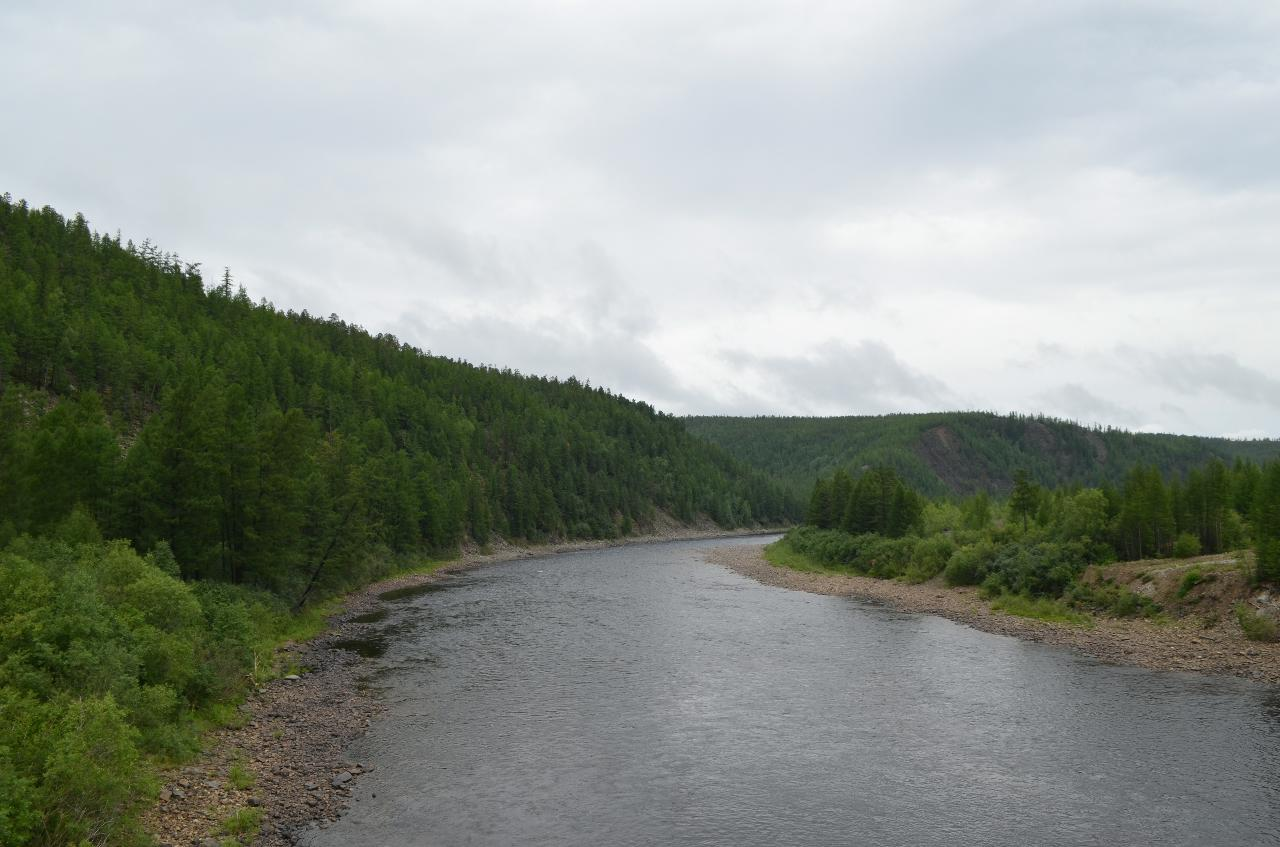
A bend in the Chulman River.

== Geology ==
The highlands are composed of Archean crystalline slates and gneisses. The Aldan Highlands coincide geographically with the Aldan Shield, a geological region that is an exposed part of the Siberian Craton. Together with the Anabar Shield further to the northwest, the Aldan Shield is one of the main features of the craton.

== Flora ==
The mountains of the highlands are covered by larch taiga up to elevations between 1,100 and 1,300 m and by rocky tundra at higher altitudes.

== See also ==
- List of mountains and hills of Russia
