= Murun (mountain) =

Mountain in Russia

- Мурун
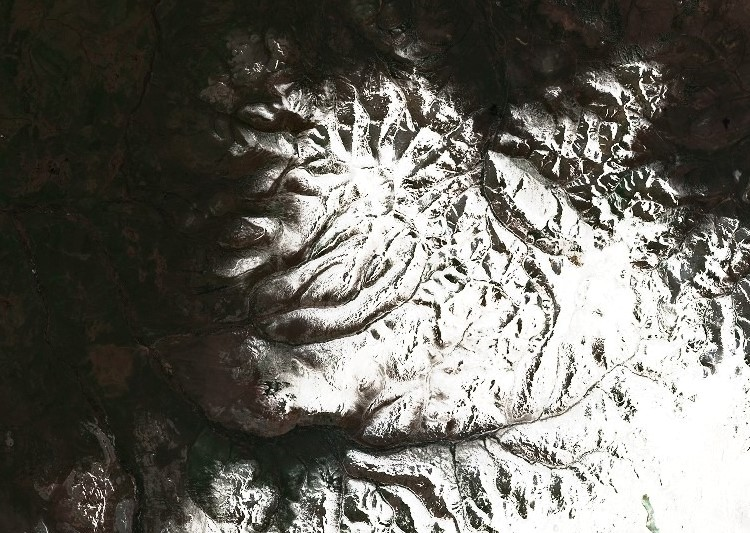
- Murun Massif Sentinel-2 image

Highest point
- Elevation: 1,454 m (4,770 ft)
- Prominence: 626 m (2,054 ft)
- Coordinates: 58°22′32″N 118°55′30″E

Geography
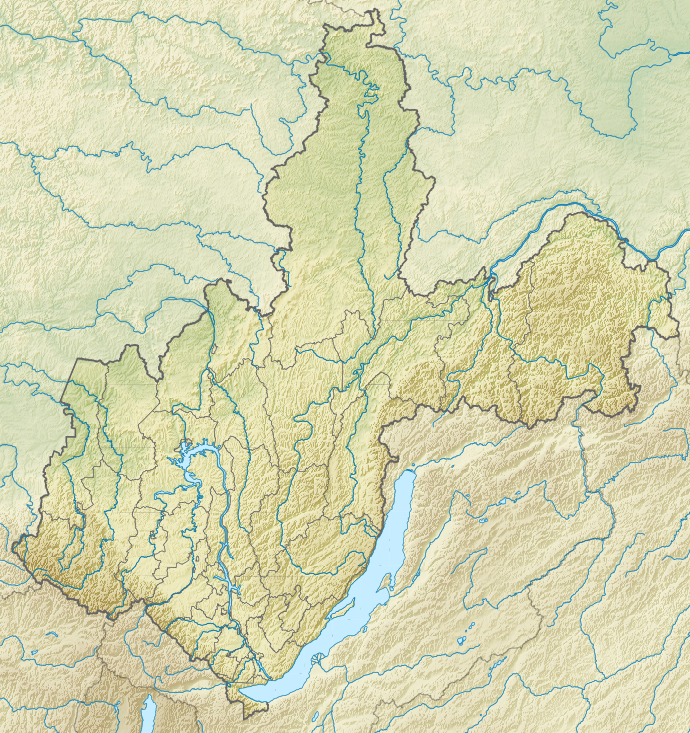
- Location within Irkutsk Oblast Location within Sakha Republic
- Location: Irkutsk Oblast/Sakha Republic; Russian Federation
- Parent range: Olyokma-Chara Plateau, South Siberian Mountains

Climbing
- Easiest route: from Chara Airport

Murun (Russian: Мурун) is a mountain in the Olyokma-Chara Plateau, at the border of Irkutsk Oblast and Yakutia, Russian Federation.

== Geography ==
A 1,454 m (4,770 ft) high summit is the highest point of the Murun Massif in the Olyokma-Chara Plateau, part of the South Siberian mountain system. The massif is about 20 km (12 mi) across and rises in the central/southern part of the plateau, above the right bank of the Chara, west of the valley of the Tokko, at the southwestern end of the Sakha Republic, bordering with Irkutsk Oblast, near the tripoint with Zabaykalsky Krai. The mountain is near Torgo, an abandoned settlement in Olyokminsky District.

The Murun peak is marked as a 1,452-metre-high (4,764 ft) summit in the O-50 sheet of the Soviet Topographic Map. This same mountain, however, is a 4,820-foot-high (1,469 m) peak in the D-7 sheet of the Defense Mapping Agency Navigation charts. The Irkutsk Oblast-Yakutia border runs across the middle of the Murun Massif and the peak rises on the western, or Irkutsk Oblast side.

== Geology ==
The massif is part of the Aldan Shield geological region. Charoite, a rare mineral, is found in the area. Other minerals, such as Brookite, Tausonite, Yuksporite and Frankamenite are also found in the massif.

== See also ==
- List of mountains and hills of Russia
