= Udokan Range =

Mountain range in Sakha Republic

Udokan Range хребет Удокан
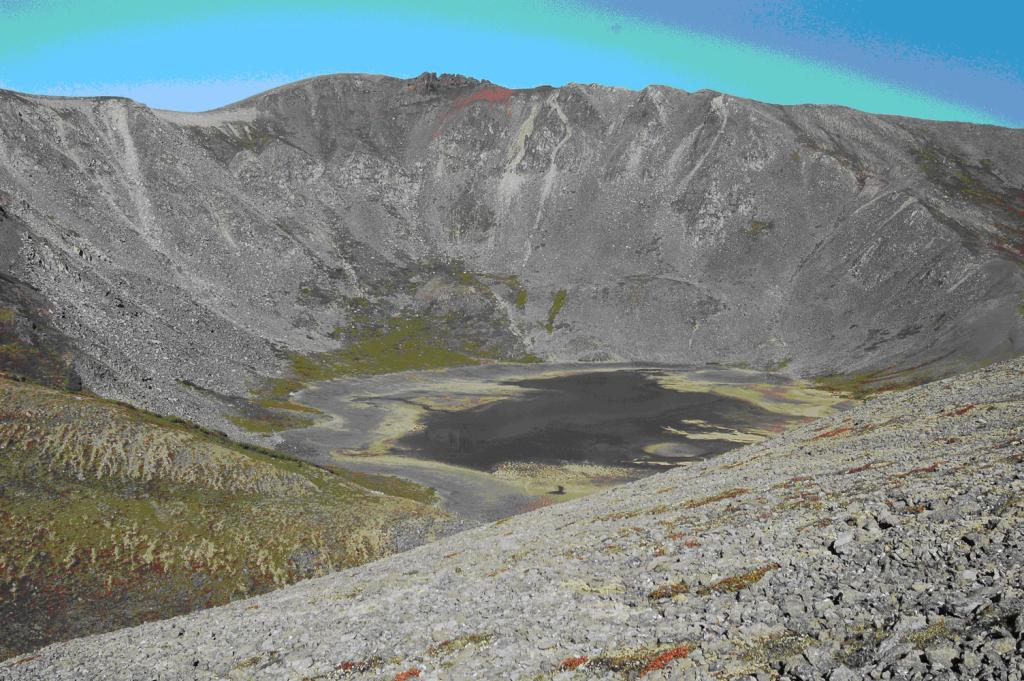
- Remnants of ancient volcanic activity in the western Udokan Range.

Highest point
- Peak: Unnamed
- Elevation: 2,570 m (8,430 ft)
- Coordinates: 56°40′20″N 119°07′32″E

Dimensions
- Length: 210 km (130 mi) SW / NE
- Width: 50 km (31 mi)

Geography
- Location within Zabaykalsky Krai
- Country: Russia
- Federal subject: Zabaykalsky Krai / Yakutia / Amur Oblast
- Range coordinates: 56°50′N 119°20′E
- Parent range: Stanovoy Highlands; South Siberian System

Geology
- Rock age: Precambrian
- Rock type(s): Gneiss, crystalline schist, volcanic rock

Climbing
- Easiest route: From Chara Airport

The Udokan Range (Russian: хребет Удокан) is a mountain range in Sakha Republic (Yakutia) and Zabaykalsky Krai, Russian Federation. The nearest town is Chara.

There is copper mining in the range at the Udokan mine, part of the Udokan Ore Region that includes the Kalar and Kodar ranges. A stretch of the Baikal–Amur Mainline passes through the range following the valley of the Khani river.

== History ==
The Udokan was first described and mapped in 1857 by A.F. Usoltsev, Lieutenant of the Corps of Military Topographers of the Russian Imperial Army.

On 5 July 1965 an Aeroflot Antonov An-2R struck a mountain of the Udokan Range on a flight between Ust-Nyukzha and Chara. The aircraft encountered poor weather with low clouds and rain while flying along the Khani river valley. The plane struck the side of a mountain of the range at 1,800 m (5,900 ft). The wreckage was found on 16 July 1969. There were three fatalities. The An-2 had been operating a Tynda–Ust-Nyukzha–Chara cargo service.

== Geography ==
The Udokan Range rises in the central area of the Stanovoy Highlands, to the south of the upper course of the Chara, a left tributary of the Olyokma. It stretches from SW to NE for roughly 255 km (158 mi) from the middle northern slopes of the Kalar Range to the river valley of the Olyokma, a right tributary of the Lena. To the north it borders with the Olyokma-Chara Plateau —in the upper reaches of the Chara river. To the south the range is bound by the valley of the Khani river, a left tributary of the Olyokma. The highest summit is a 2,570 metres (8,430 ft) high unnamed ultra prominent peak.

The range is part of the Baikal Rift Zone and displays signs of volcanic relief at its southwestern end, in the area where it merges with the Kalar Range.

=== Hydrography ===
A number of rivers have their sources in the range, including the Tokko and the Kalar. There are also glacial landforms and sediments that are remnants of Pleistocene glaciation.

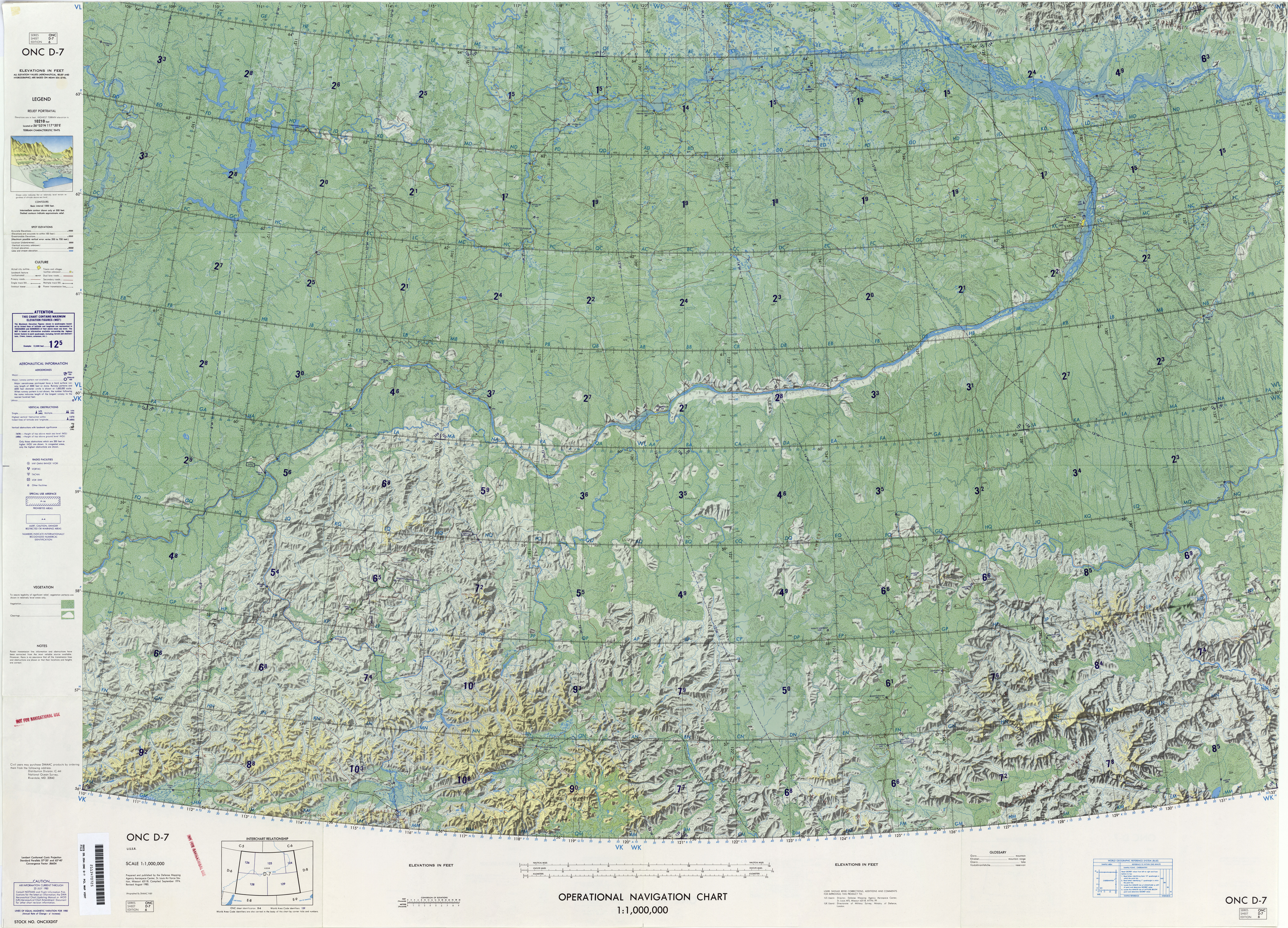
Defense Mapping Agency topographical map showing the Udokan Range in the lower part.

== Flora ==
The lower slopes of the range are mainly covered by larch taiga, with pre-alpine woodland, mountain tundra and bare rocky summits (golets) at higher elevations.

== See also ==
- Baikal Rift Zone
- List of mountains and hills of Russia
- List of ultras of Northeast Asia
