= Apsat =

APSAT may refer to:

- Adenylylsulfate—ammonia adenylyltransferase, an enzyme
- Apsat (river), a tributary of the Chara in Zabaykalsky Krai, Russia
- Apsat (mythology), a male deity of birds and animals in the pagan Svan mythology
