= Aldan Shield =

Coordinates: 58°30′N 125°30′E

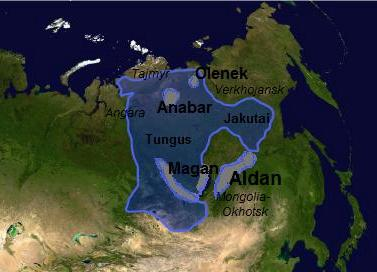
The Aldan Shield geological region in the southeast of the Siberian Craton.

Location within the Sakha Republic, Russia

Aldan Shield (Russian: Алданский щит) is a shield in Siberia. It is an exposed basement of the Siberian Craton. Together with the Anabar Shield further to the northwest, the Aldan Shield is one of the main features of the craton.

The Aldan Shield geological region coincides geographically with parts of the Aldan Highlands and Olyokma-Chara Plateau, located at the southern end of the Sakha Republic and the eastern end of Irkutsk Oblast. The exposed crust parts of the shield date back to the Archean and reflect the first phases of accretion of the crust. They only emerge in a few areas, the eastern and northern sectors of the shield being largely covered by sediments accumulated between the end of the Precambrian and the Cambrian, while in the western and southern regions they have undergone processes of tectonic rejuvenation that have brought about the formation of new structures above and below.

On the Aldan Shield there is the only charoite deposit known in the world - the Sirenevyi Kamen (Lilac Stone) of the Murun Massif. Many other rare and unusual minerals occur in the area of the shield, such as brookite, frankamenite, tausonite and yuksporite.

== See also ==
- Akitkan
- Arctica
- List of shields and cratons
- Tunguska Basin
