= Frankamenite =

Fluorine-dominate variation of canasite

General
- Category: Inosilicates
- Formula: K_{3}Na_{3}Ca_{5}(Si_{12}O_{30})[F,(OH)]_{4}·(H_{2}O)
- IMA symbol: Fkm
- Strunz classification: 9.DG.90
- Crystal system: Triclinic
- Crystal class: Pedial (1) (same H-M symbol)
- Space group: P1

Identification
- Color: Greenish blue, bluish gray, greenish gray, lilac gray
- Crystal habit: Lath, columnar
- Cleavage: Good on (010) and (100)
- Tenacity: Brittle
- Mohs scale hardness: 5.5
- Luster: Vitreous
- Streak: Pale blue
- Diaphaneity: Transparent to translucent
- Specific gravity: 2.68
- Optical properties: Biaxial positive
- Refractive index: n_{α} = 1.536 n_{β} = 1.539 n_{γ} = 1.542
- Birefringence: 0.0060
- Dispersion: r < v strong

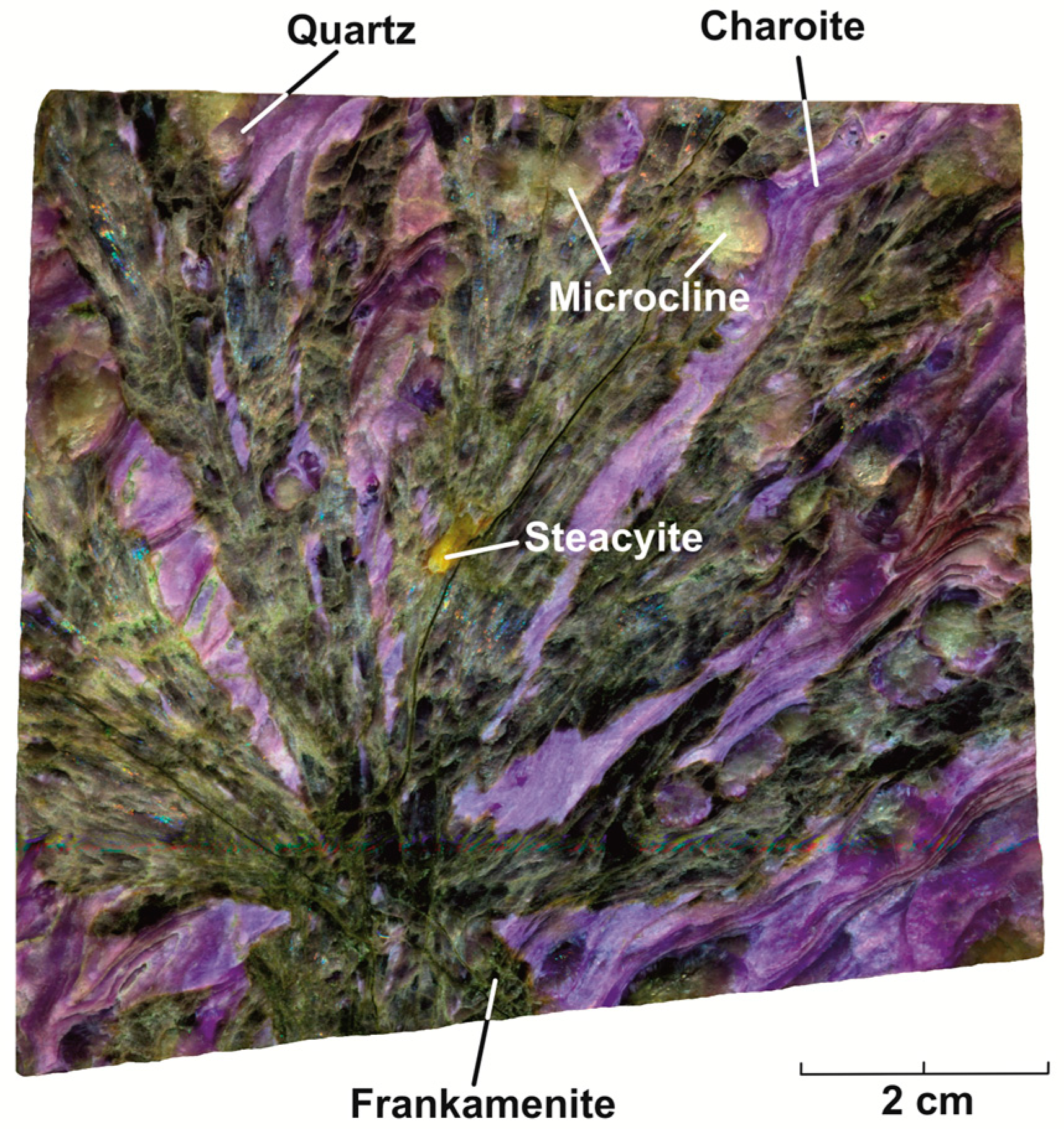
A sample of charoitite with frankamenite, Siberia, Russia

Frankamenite is the fluorine-dominate variation of the rare mineral canasite with a general formula of K_{3}Na_{3}Ca_{5}(Si_{12}O_{30})[F,(OH)]_{4}·(H_{2}O).

Frankamenite belongs to the triclinic crystal system, with the bases of its structure containing Ca-Na mixed octahedra joined by octagonal tubes SiO_{4} of the composition (Si_{12}O_{30}). Frankamenite has six Ca-Na mixed positions distributed amongst these octahedra, reflecting its varying compositions.

Frankamenite was named for the Russian mineralogist-crystallographer V. A. Frank-Kamentsky (1915–1994), who discovered the mineral.

Frankamenite occurs in association with the rare mineral charoite, which is found only in the Murun Massif of the Olyokma-Chara Plateau, Aldan Shield, Sakha Republic, Yakutia, Siberia, Russia. Here, metasomatism enriches a syenite massif with potassium when it comes into contact with a limestone at around 200–250 °C. This metamorphic process produces a potassium feldspar metasomatite, the typical geological environment for canasite and, therefore, frankamenite. Frankamenite and charoitein are exclusive to the Sakha Republic in this sort of environment, as mineralogists have yet to discover the minerals elsewhere.
