= Eveslogite =

Inosilicate mineral

General
- Category: Inosilicate
- Formula: (Ca,K,Na,Sr,Ba)_{48}[(Ti,Nb,Fe,Mn)_{12}(OH)_{12}Si_{48}O_{144}](F,OH,Cl)_{14}
- IMA symbol: Evl
- Strunz classification: 9.DG.97
- Crystal system: Monoclinic
- Crystal class: Prismatic (2/m) (same H-M symbol)
- Space group: P2/m

Identification
- Cleavage: perfect {001} and {010}
- Fracture: splintery
- Tenacity: brittle
- Mohs scale hardness: 5
- Luster: vitreous to resinous; silky
- Streak: white and at times yellow-brown
- Density: 2.85 g/cm^{3} (meas.); 2.93 g/cm^{3} (calc.)

Eveslogite is a complex inosilicate mineral with a chemical formula (Ca,K,Na,Sr,Ba)_{48}[(Ti,Nb,Fe,Mn)_{12}(OH)_{12}Si_{48}O_{144}](F,OH,Cl)_{14} found on Mt. Eveslogchorr in Khibiny Mountains, on the Kola Peninsula, Russia. It was named after the place it was found.

This silicate mineral occurs as an anchimonomineral veinlet that cross-cuts poikilitic nepheline syenite. This mineral appears to resemble yuksporite, as it forms similar placated fine fibrous of approximately 0.05 to 0.005mm that aggregates outwardly. The color of eveslogite is yellow or rather light brown. In addition, it is a semitransparent mineral that has a white streak and a vitreous luster. Its crystal system is monoclinic and possesses a hardness (Mohs) of 5. It belongs to the astrophyllite group of minerals and contains structures that are composed of titanosilicate layers (Krivovichev et al., 2004). Limited information about this mineral exists due to the few research studies carried out since its recent discovery.

== Introduction ==
Eveslogite is a monoclinic-prismatic mineral that contains aluminum, calcium, barium, chlorine, hydrogen, fluorine, manganese, iron, niobium, potassium, oxygen, silicon, tantalum, sodium, titanium and zirconium. It is usually found at Mount Eveslogchorr in the Khibina alkaline massif of the Kola Peninsula, Russia. This mineral adds to the rapidly expanding class of the porous materials that are vital in gas separation, catalysis, optoelectronics, and in ion exchange processes. According to the article Crystal Research and Technology by Depmeier that seeks to further explain the properties of eveslogite, this mineral is in almost all aspect similar to yuksporite. However, when compared to yuksporite, eveslogite has a smaller barium content and it possesses different thermal capability. This mineral was discovered by Yuri Menshikov in 1998.

== Composition ==
Eveslogite is a complex titanosilicate made up of numerous elements including silicon, sodium, calcium and potassium. Its chemical formula is (Ca,K,Na,Sr,Ba)_{48}[(Ti,Nb,Fe,Mn)_{12}(OH)_{12}Si_{48}O_{144}](F,OH,Cl)_{14}, with the number of atoms in the chemical formula being 298.4. The listed elements in the formula are Ba, Cl, Ca, Fe, F, H, K, Mn, O, Sr, Si and Ti. The table below shows the composition of elements and their relative weight.

Element	Symbol	Weight%	Atoms	Atoms%	Atom weight (u)	Sum weight (u)
Hydrogen	H	0.29	20.4	6.84	1.0079470	20.5621188
Oxygen	O	37.28	164.4	55.09	15.9994300	2,630.3062920
Fluorine	F	1.13	4.2	1.41	18.9984033	79.7932937
Sodium	Na	1.56	4.8	1.61	22.9897702	110.3508970
Silicon	Si	19.11	48	16.09	28.0855300	1,348.1054400
Chlorine	Cl	0.70	1.4	0.47	35.4532000	49.6344800
Potassium	K	6.65	12	4.02	39.0983100	469.1797200
Calcium	Ca	14.99	26.4	8.85	40.0784000	1,058.0697600
Titanium	Ti	4.48	6.6	2.21	47.8671000	315.9228600
Manganese	Mn	0.47	0.6	0.20	54.9380499	32.9628299
Iron	Fe	0.95	1.2	0.40	55.8452000	67.0142400
Strontium	Sr	2.98	2.4	0.80	87.6210000	210.2904000
Niobium	Nb	4.74	3.6	1.21	92.9063820	334.4629752
Barium	Ba	4.67	2.4	0.80	137.3277000	329.5864800

In addition, this mineral has the empirical formula Ca22.46K12.27Na10.3Sr1.8Ba1.25Ti5.53Nb3.34Mn3+0.95Fe2+0.83Fe3+0.2Zr0.19Rb0.14Ta0.08 (OH)12Si47.3Al0.41O138.08(OH)9.42Cl0.8 and a molecular weight of 6,800.28 grams. Due to this form of composition, eveslogite’s structure has been observed to resist characterization because of its poor diffraction of its crystals and also due to its small dimensions (Chukanov et al., 2008). The aspect of characterization has been made possible after the late 20th century discovery of the 3rd generation X-ray synchrotron sources that made it possible to structurally characterize various mineral elements that could not have been characterized using the in-house X-ray sources (Burzo, 2006).

=== Physical properties ===
Eveslogite is a titanosilicate mineral that falls under the group of astrophyllite and fits within the point and space group P2/m {P1 1 2/m} {P2/m} {P1 2/m 1}. It is a mineral that is light brown or yellowish in color. It has a silky structure with white streak. Its tenacity is brittle and an indistinctly perfect cleavage of {001} and {010}. In regard to its general appearance, as explained by Chukanov et al. 2008, this mineral is indistinguishable from yuksporite and other related titanosilicate. In addition, the article American Mineralogist further expounds on both the measured and calculated densities of this mineral. After measuring the density of eveslogite it recorded a total of 2.85 g/cm3 but when directly calculated, it recorded a slightly higher density of 2.93 g/cm3. Additionally, the physical characteristics of eveslogite include a fracture that is largely splintery and a rough semitransparent gold like appearance.

== Structure ==
The structure of eveslogite is based upon complex rods that consist of the corner sharing octahedral (TiO) and the tetrahedral SiO4. Due to its 5- Apatite hardness and density of 2.85 the general structure of this mineral is a rigid but porous in nature just like other astrophyllite. Some of the minerals that are largely associated with Eveslogite in terms of close similarity of their structure include nepheline, biotite, fluorite, K-feldspar, eudialyte and also many other minerals that fall under the astrophyllite group. Eveslogite is an orthorhombic mineral that fits within the space group 2lm prismatic. Eveslogite structure of the titanosilicate rods is remarkably unique when compared with other tetrahedral silicates. This is because it consists of a total of nine distinct symmetry independent silicates, which includes; SilO4, Si4O4, and Si5O4 similar to the xonotlite double chains structure.

Although eveslogite has a rigid structure, the nanorods (Ti,Nb)_{4}(O,OH)_{4}[Si_{6}O_{17}]_{2}[Si_{2}O_{7}]_{3} are porous. These internal pores in the structure of eveslogite are defined by eight-Membered rings (8MR) separated by two parallel channels of Si_{9}O_{4} and Si_{4}O_{7} tetrahedral groups (Krivovichev et al., 2004). On the other hand, the inside part of eveslogite titanosilicate nanorods is composed of alkali metals cations Na^{+}, K^{+} and the H_{2}O molecules. In general, the composition of the structure, eveslogite, is especially in the discovery of the existence of titanosilicate nanorods in the composition of this mineral that provides a vital notion for further research and understanding of the structural diversity of titanosilicate and other alkaline astrophyllite. However, at present, the individual crystal structure of the eveslogite minerals is well described in detail in the article of Geology of Ore Deposits (Chukanov et al. 2008).

== Geological occurrence ==
The particles of eveslogite are found in Mt. Eveslogchorr in the Khibiny Mountains. In particular the geological occurrence of this mineral and the place of conservation for this mineral is Fersman Mineralogical Museum in Moscow, Russia (Hawthorne 2012). Eveslogite derives its name from this locality, particularly from Mt. Evesglochorr. Since it is a newly discovered mineral, there has not been extensive research to show if it occurs in any significant amounts in other parts of the world.

Eveslogite often occurs in close proximity with other rare-earth minerals, particularly the other Astrophyllite mineral elements, in addition, intergrowths with particular orientations are frequently found. In regard to its geological setting. Eveslogite is commonly found in peralkaline granitoids, where it may be selectively included by certain major minerals (such as feldspar) or may form aggregates of multiple types of other minerals that are also found at Mt. Eveslogchorr.

== Special characteristics ==
Eveslogite's synonym is IMA2001-023 and its axial ratios are; a:b:c =0.5641:1:1.7768. Its estimated radioactivity is barely detectable (GRapi=172.67 (Gamma Ray American Petroleum Institute Units). According to the research carried out by Krivovichev et al., the chemical composition of eveslogite was determined through a wavelength-dispersion spectrometry, which encompasses the Cameca MS-46 microbe electron that was operating at 20kV. This strategy was adopted because of the traditional test of bond lengths and the bond-valence analysis, resulting in errors and therefore could not result in reliable information. Through the use of the wavelength dispersion spectrometry approach, other special feature of the Eveslogite were that, the rods in the structure of the Eveslogite are separated by walls that appears to be parallel and acts as the main linkage of the rods to the 3-dimensional structure of this mineral. This is a special feature to this mineral since other minerals that fall into this Astrophyllite group do not possess these walls in between their rods structure.
