= Torgo =

Torgo may refer to:

- Torgo (Marvel Comics robot)
- Torgo, a character in the 1966 horror film Manos: The Hands of Fate
  - Torgo, a parody of the 1966 character in episodes of Mystery Science Theater 3000
- Torgo (urban-type settlement), in the Sakha Republic, Russia
