= Fluorcanasite =

General
- Category: Minerals
- Formula: K_{3}Na_{3}Ca_{5}Si_{12}O_{30}F_{4}•H_{2}O
- Strunz classification: 09.DG.80
- Dana classification: 78.05.04.02
- Crystal system: Monoclinic
- Crystal class: Domatic (m)
- Space group: Bm
- Unit cell: 1,602.59 Å³

Identification
- Formula mass: 1,297.67 gm
- Color: Light Yellow
- Cleavage: Eminent on {100} and {201} Perfect on {001}
- Fracture: Hackly, Step-like
- Tenacity: Brittle
- Mohs scale hardness: 5
- Luster: Vitreous
- Streak: White
- Diaphaneity: Transparent
- Specific gravity: 2.68
- Density: Measured 2.68(2); Calculated 2.69
- Optical properties: Biaxial (+)
- Refractive index: n_{α} = 1.538(1) n_{β} = 1.546(1) n_{γ} = 1.549(1)
- Birefringence: 0.011
- Pleochroism: Strong
- 2V angle: Measured 60° (2); Calculated 63°
- Dispersion: Medium r > v
- Ultraviolet fluorescence: None
- Solubility: Slowly decomposes in acid
- Other characteristics: Radioactive 0.77% (K)

Fluorcanasite is a rare calcium, potassium and sodium fluoride silicate mineral. It was discovered in 2003, in the Kirovsk mine's dumps in Russia, and was approved by the IMA in 2007. The name fluorcanasite is a portmanteau, and was made by blending fluorine, a chemical element that can be found in the mineral, and canasite, as the mineral is close to canasite in several ways: it is an analogue of said mineral and a member of the canasite group. Fluorcanasite is also close to frankamenite.

== Properties ==
It is the triclinic analogue of canasite, and a member of the canasite group. It grows into prismatic crystals that can reach up to 2 mm in size, extending along [010]. It is pleochroic, meaning that the color of the mineral seems to change depending on the axis it is viewed at. It is coloured amber, purple and lilac respectively along the α, β and γ optical axes. Parting is parallel to {001}. Hackly fracture only occurs on the b axis; on a and c axis, the fracture is stepped.

It consists mostly of oxygen (38.22%), silicon (25.97%) and calcium (15.44%), but also contains potassium (9.04%), fluorine (5.86%) and sodium (5.31%). Its potassium content results in a barely detectable radioactivity level of 129.46 Gamma Ray American Petroleum Institute (GRapi) units and a concentration per GRapi unit of 0.77%.

== Occurrences and localities ==
Fluorcanasite is a type locality at Mount Kukisvumchorr, Russia. It is associated with pectolite, microcline, nepheline, villiaumite, shcherbakovite, rasvumite, lamprophyllite, mosandrite, molybdenite and aegirine.
