= Canasite =

Silicate mineral

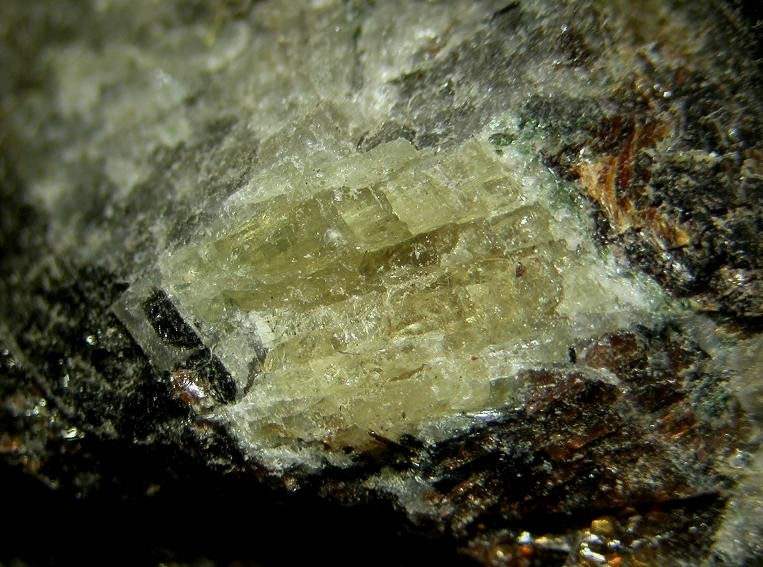

General
- Category: Silicate minerals
- Formula: K_{3}Na_{3}Ca_{5}Si_{12}O_{30}(OH)_{4}
- IMA symbol: Cns
- Strunz classification: 09.DG.80
- Dana classification: 78.05.04.01
- Crystal system: Monoclinic
- Crystal class: Monoclinic-Prismatic
- Unit cell: 1,596.05

Identification
- Color: Brownish Yellow, Green Yellow, Light Green
- Twinning: Polysynthetic
- Cleavage: Perfect 1 direction, good 1 direction
- Fracture: Splintery
- Mohs scale hardness: 5 - 6
- Luster: Vitreous
- Streak: White, Clear
- Diaphaneity: Transparent, translucent
- Specific gravity: 2.707
- Density: 2.707
- Optical properties: Biaxial (-)
- Refractive index: n_{α} = 1.534 n_{β} = 1.538 n_{γ} = 1.543
- Birefringence: 0.009
- Pleochroism: None
- 2V angle: Measured 58° Calculated 84°
- Dispersion: Weak r > v
- Fusibility: Easily fusible to a transparent glass
- Solubility: Readily decomposed by acids
- Other characteristics: Radioactive 1.12% (K)

Major varieties
- Fluorcanasite: K_{3}Na_{3}Ca_{5}Si_{12}O_{30}F_{4} · H2O
- Frankamenite: K_{3}Na_{3}Ca_{5}(Si_{12}O_{30})[F,(OH)]_{4}·(H_{2}O)

Canasite is a silicate mineral whose name is derived from its chemical composition of calcium (Ca), sodium (Na), and silicon (Si). It was approved in 1959 by IMA.

== Properties ==
It is a relatively rare mineral. It occurs as aggregates in charoite, creating cabochons when contrasted against swirling purple charoite. It is extremely rare for canasite to be faceted. As crystals, it occurs in a size up to ten cms, but in platy aggregates it can reach up to 20 cms in size. It is also granular. Twinning is usual, and can occur as polysynthetic, which is when multiple twins align in a parallel. It has a barely detectable 1.12% potassium radioactivity based on the GRapi unit (Gamma Ray American Petroleum Institute Units). It consists of mostly oxygen (41.98%), silicon (26.8%) and calcium (15.93%), but otherwise contains sodium (7.31%), potassium (6.22%), which gives its radioactive properties, fluorine (1.51%) and hydrogen (0.24%). There are two varieties of canasite: fluorcanasite and frankamenite. Purple canasite may be confused with stichtite, but recent research has found that the mineral advertised as canasite is a new specimen.

== Occurrences and localities ==
Canasite has been found in three localities, all in Russia. In Khibiny massif, it grows in a differentiated alkalic massif in pegmatites, and in the Murun massif, it grows in charoitic rocks. It also occurs in the Kola Peninsula. In Khibiny massif, it is associated with titanite, eudialyte, orthoclase, nepheline, pyroxene, lamprophyllite and fenaksite, while the specimens from Murun massif are usually associated with charoite, tinaksite and miserite.
