= Kalar (river) =

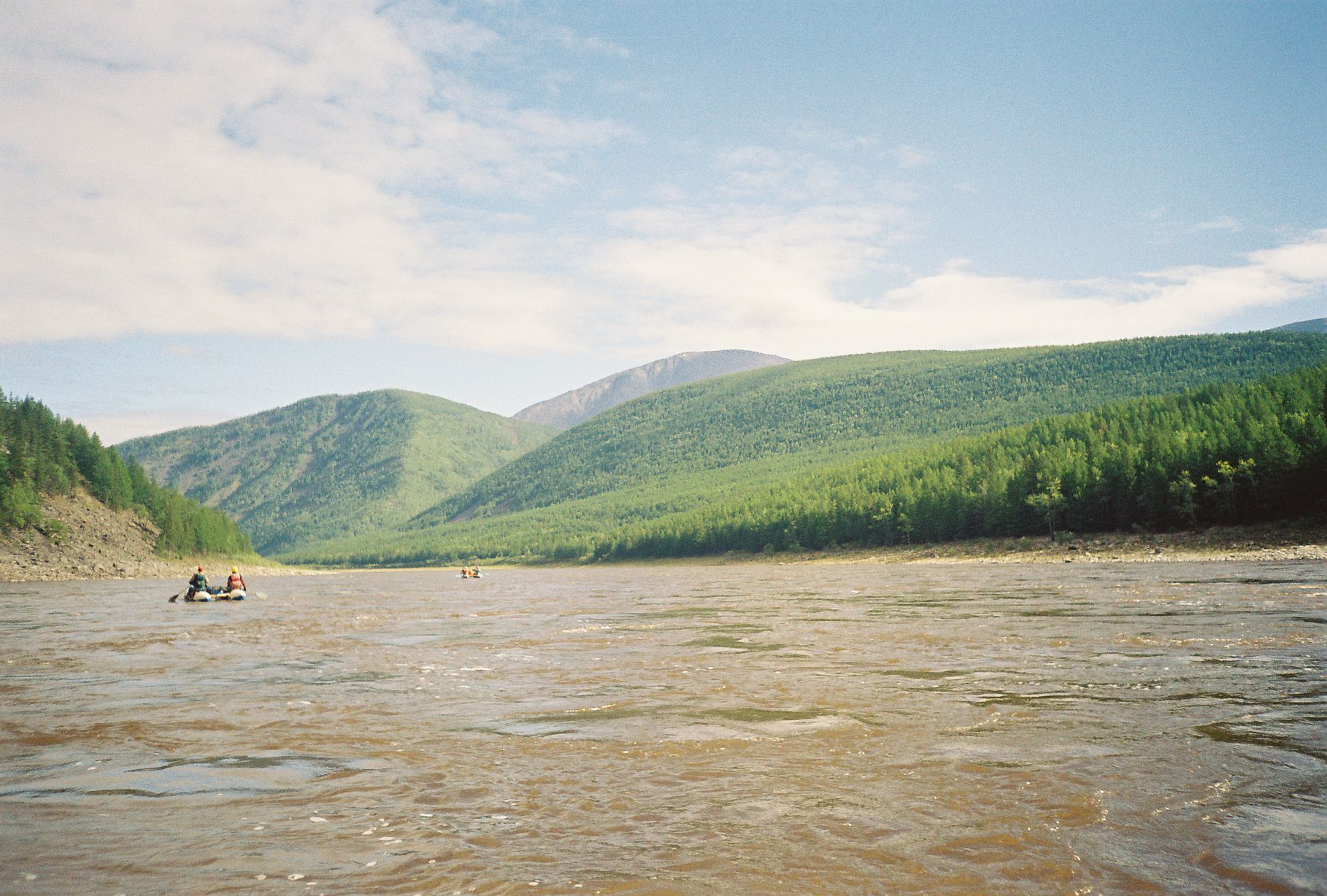
- View of the river in mid-course

- Mouth location in Zabaykalsky Krai, Russia

Location
- Country: Russia
- Federal subject: Zabaykalsky Krai

Physical characteristics
- Source: Udokan Range; Stanovoy Highlands
  - coordinates: 56°31′58″N 118°37′11″E
  - elevation: 1,612 m (5,289 ft)
- Mouth: Vitim
  - coordinates: 55°21′53″N 116°15′49″E
  - elevation: 561 m (1,841 ft)
- Length: 511 km (318 mi)
- Basin size: 17,400 km^{2} (6,700 sq mi)
- Discharge
  - average: 150 m^{3}/s (5,300 cu ft/s)

Basin features
- Progression: Vitim→ Lena→ Laptev Sea

The Kalar (Russian: Калар), known as the Levoy Chinoy in its upper section, is a river in Zabaykalsky Krai, southern East Siberia, Russia. It is 511 kilometres (318 mi) long, and has a drainage basin of 17,400 square kilometres (6,700 sq mi). The area through which the river flows is mountainous in most of its length with frequent rapids in the riverbed. The waters are rich in fish, including grayling, lenok, taimen and whitefish, among other species. In the International scale of river difficulty the Kalar is a Class III - IV destination for rafting and kayaking.

The Kalar has lent its name to a number of other geographic features, including the Kalar Range, the local Kalar District, as well as Sredny Kalar (Middle Kalar) village by its right bank 156 kilometres (97 mi) from its mouth.

== Course ==
The Kalar is a right tributary of the Vitim. Its sources are between the Udokan Range and the Kalar Range subranges of the Stanovoy Highlands. In its upper course it cuts eastwards across the Kalar Range in a wide arc as the Levoy Chinoy. The river flows at the foot of Skalisty Golets, the highest peak of the Kalar Range. Then it turns and flows roughly southwestwards as the Kalar. The Kalar range rises above the northern banks of the river and the Yankan Range above the southern, separating it from the course of the Kalakan to the south. Finally, at the border with Buryatia the Kalar meets the Vitim 900 kilometres (560 mi) from its mouth in the Lena.

The longest tributaries of the Kalar are the 71 km (44 mi) long Katugin and the 71 km (44 mi) long Chukchudu from the right, and the 89 km (55 mi) long Dzhemku, the 60 km (37 mi) long Lucha and the 53 km (33 mi) long Chitkanda from the left. The river is frozen between mid October and mid May. About 20% of the basin area is covered by forests.

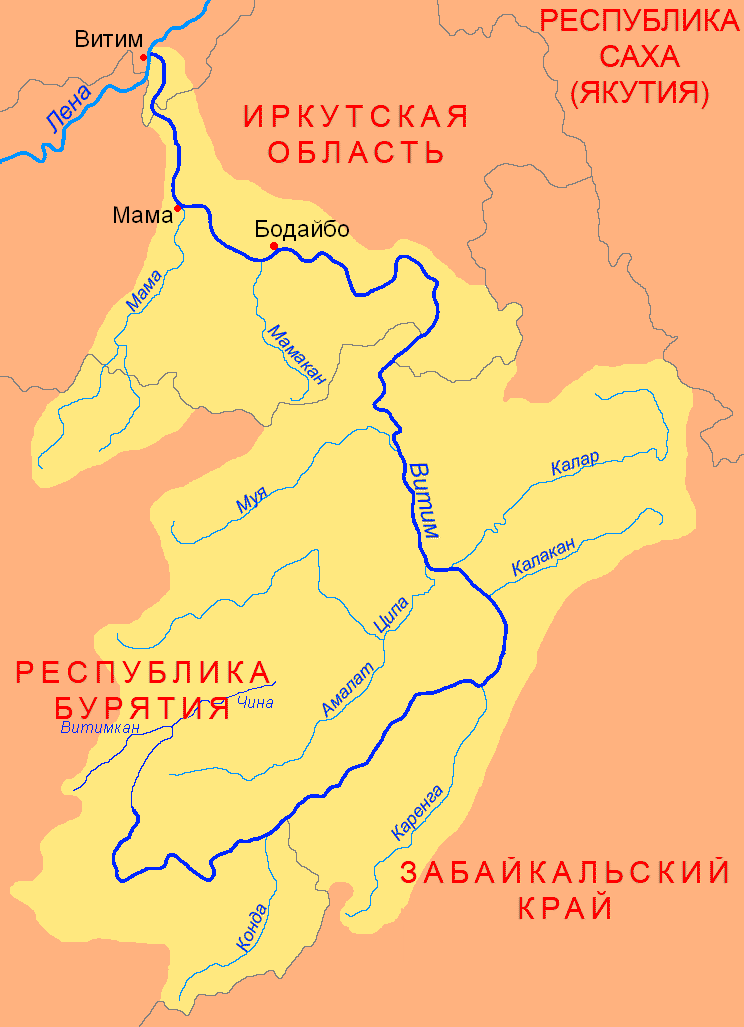
Basin of the Vitim with the Kalar in the upper right.

== See also ==
- List of rivers of Russia
