= Kalar Range =

Mountain range in Zabaykalsky Krai and Amur Oblast, Russia

Kalar Range Каларский хребет
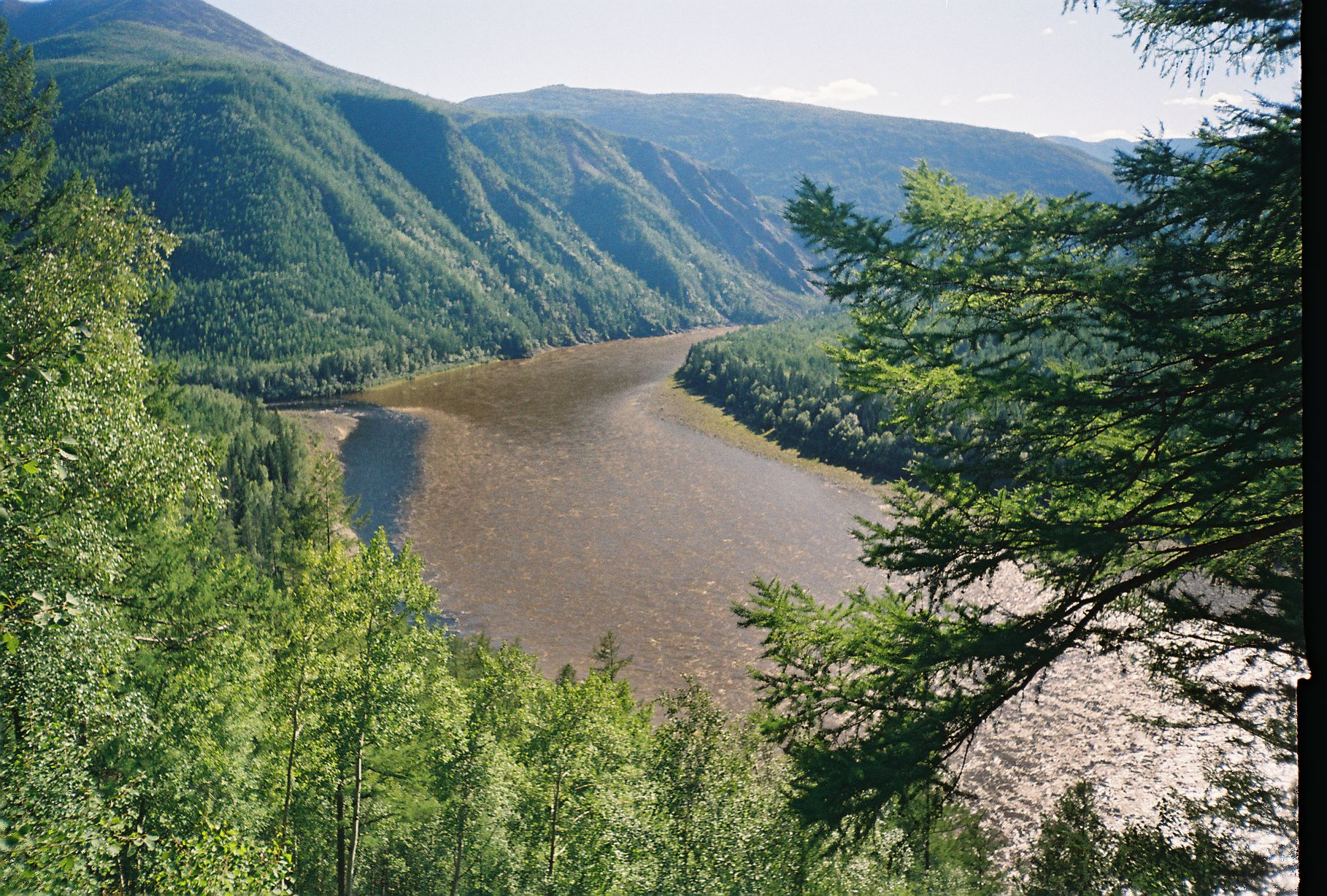
- One of the right tributaries of the Kalar river

Highest point
- Peak: Skalisty Golets
- Elevation: 2,520 m (8,270 ft)
- Coordinates: 56°24′01″N 119°05′04″E

Dimensions
- Length: 350 km (220 mi) WSW / ENE
- Width: 70 km (43 mi)

Geography
- Location within Zabaykalsky Krai
- Country: Russia
- Federal subject: Zabaykalsky Krai / Amur Oblast
- Range coordinates: 56°20′N 118°0′E
- Parent range: Stanovoy Highlands; South Siberian System

Geology
- Rock age(s): Early Archean and Proterozoic
- Rock type(s): Granite, metamorphic rock

The Kalar Range (Russian: Каларский хребет, romanized: Kalarskiy khrebet) is a mountain range in Zabaykalsky Krai and the NW end of Amur Oblast, Russian Federation. The highest point of the range is 2,520 m (8,270 ft) high Skalisty Golets.

The range is part of the Udokan Ore Region that includes the Kodar and Udokan ranges.

== History ==
Located in a desolate area, the Kalar Range was first described and roughly put on the map in 1857 by A.F. Usoltsev, Lieutenant of the Corps of Military Topographers of the Russian Imperial Army. Usoltsev sighted the range from the right bank of the Kalar River.

== Geography ==
The Kalar Range belongs to the Stanovoy Highlands. It stretches from WSW to ENE for roughly 350 km (220 mi) from the Vitim river valley to the Olyokma, both right tributaries of the Lena. To the north it borders the Chara depression —in the upper reaches of the Chara river, and the western spurs of the Udokan Range. To the south the range is bound by the valley of the Kalar river, a right tributary of the Vitim, which separates it from the Yankan Range. While peaks in the western part are generally flat-topped, the eastern end has a more marked alpine relief.

=== Hydrography ===
A number of rivers have their sources in the range, including the Kalar river, with its right tributaries Katugin, Chukundu and Bugungda. Also the right tributaries of the Vitim river, Taksima and Kuanda, the left tributaries of the Olyokma, Tas-Yuryakh and Imangra, as well as several right tributaries of the Chara, also a left tributary of the Olyokma. River Nyukzha flows across the range in its eastern part.

== Flora ==
The higher slopes of the range are mainly covered with sparse coniferous forest, while below 1,100 m (3,600 ft) to 1,400 m (4,600 ft) mountain larch taiga predominates.

== See also ==
- Baikal Rift Zone
- List of mountains and hills of Russia
