= Kalakan (river) =

River in southern East Siberia, Russia

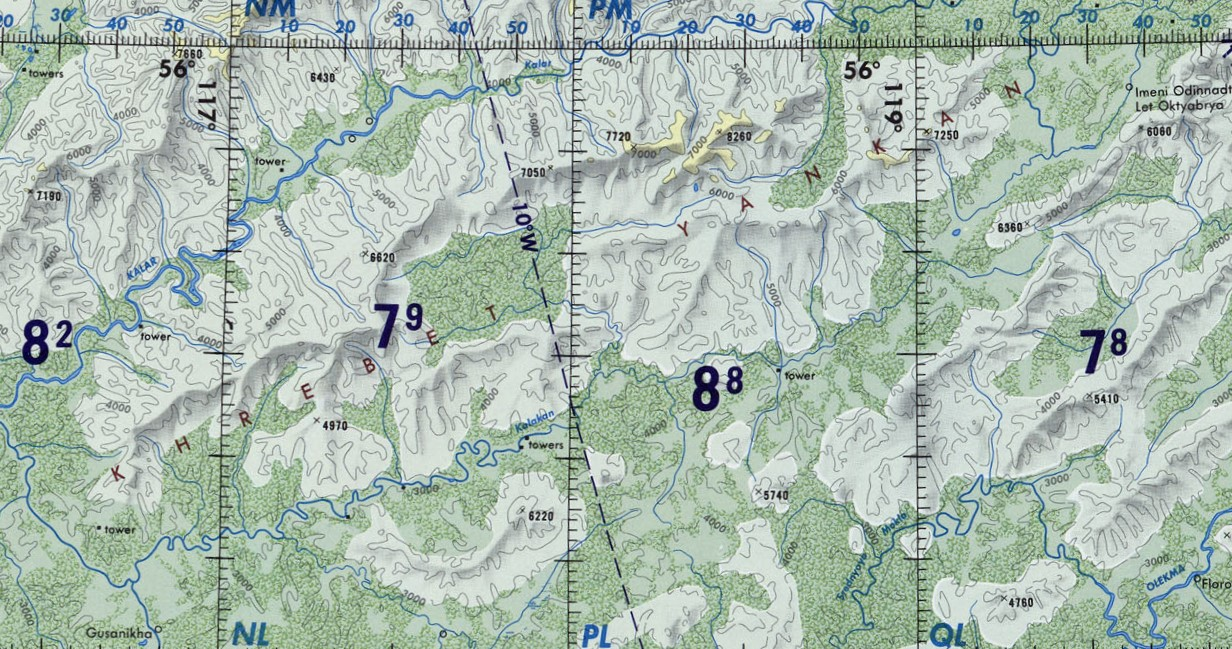
- Kalakan river course

- Mouth location in Transbaikalia, Russia

Location
- Country: Russia
- Federal subject: Zabaykalsky Krai

Physical characteristics
- Source: Kalakan Range; South Siberian System
  - coordinates: 55°39′48″N 119°23′52″E
- Mouth: Vitim
  - coordinates: 55°07′14″N 116°45′42″E
  - elevation: 802 m (2,631 ft)
- Length: 314 km (195 mi)
- Basin size: 10,600 km^{2} (4,100 sq mi)
- Discharge
  - average: 78 m^{3}/s (2,800 cu ft/s)

Basin features
- Progression: Vitim→ Lena→ Laptev Sea

The Kalakan (Russian: Калакан) is a river in Transbaikalia, southern East Siberia, Russia. It is 314 kilometres (195 mi) long, and has a drainage basin of 10,600 square kilometres (4,100 sq mi). The Kalakan gives its name to the Kalakan Range, as well as to the Kalakan Depression.

The Kalakan river is a destination for rafting. Taimen and lenok are among the fish species found in the river.

== Course ==
The Kalakan is a right tributary of the Vitim. Its sources are in the Kalakan Range, at the eastern edge of the Vitim Plateau, where it flows first to the north. After a short distance it bends to the left and flows in a WSW direction along the feet of the Yankan Range, which separates it from the course of the Kalar to the north. The Kalakan Range rises above the left bank of the river. There are up to 3 km (1.9 mi) wide floodplain sections, as well as branched-meandering sections in the lower course of the Kalakan. Finally the Kalakan meets the Vitim at the Buryatian border 958 kilometres (595 mi) from the Vitim's mouth in the Lena.

The longest tributary of the Kalakan is the 136 km (85 mi) long Tundak on the left and the 96 km (60 mi) long Usmun on the right. The river is frozen between mid October and mid May. There are 96 lakes with a total area of 2.3 square kilometres (0.89 sq mi) in the basin of the Kalakan. The area is marked by permafrost.

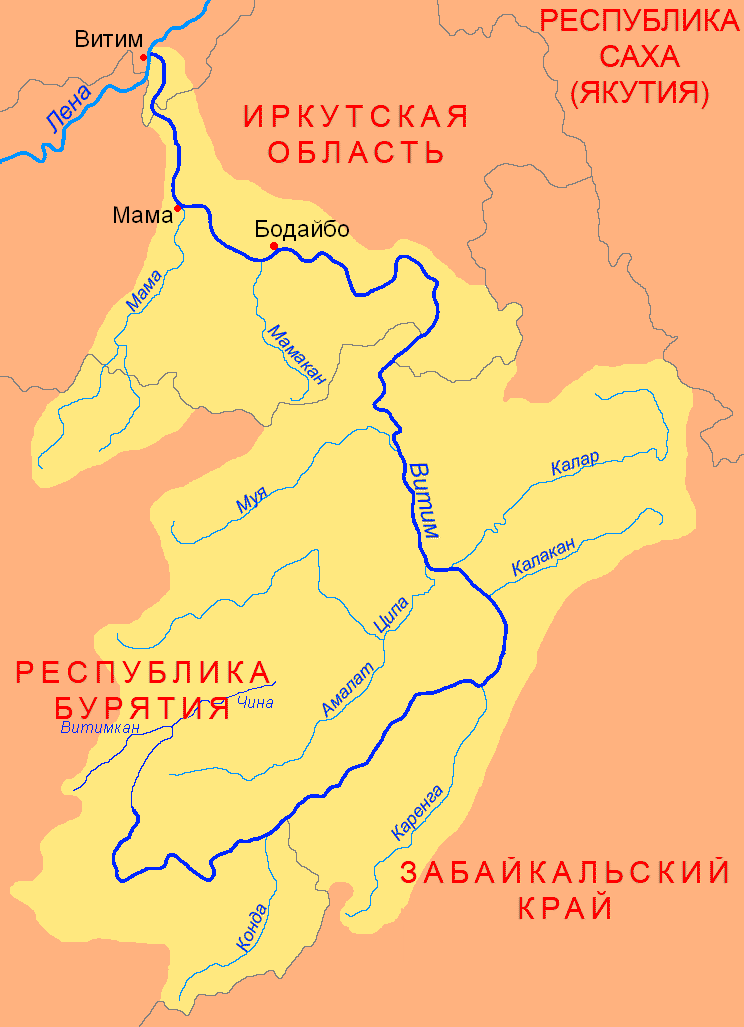
Basin of the Vitim with the Kalakan in the right side.

== See also ==
- List of rivers of Russia
