= Tausonite =

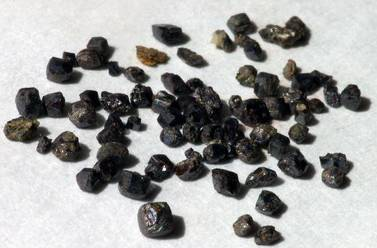

General
- Category: Oxide mineral
- Formula: SrTiO_{3}
- IMA symbol: Tau
- Strunz classification: 4.CC.35
- Crystal system: Cubic
- Crystal class: Hexoctahedral (m3̅m); H-M symbol: (4/m 3̅ 2/m)
- Space group: Pm3m
- Unit cell: a = 3.9 Å; Z = 1

Identification
- Color: Red, red-brown, orange, dark gray
- Crystal habit: Cubic and octahedral crystals, granular, massive
- Cleavage: None
- Fracture: Conchoidal
- Tenacity: Brittle
- Mohs scale hardness: 6-6.5
- Luster: Adamantine
- Diaphaneity: Translucent to opaque
- Specific gravity: 4.88
- Optical properties: Isotropic
- Refractive index: n = 2.40

Tausonite is the rare naturally occurring mineral form of strontium titanate: chemical formula: SrTiO_{3}. It occurs as red to orange brown cubic crystals and crystal masses.

It is a member of the perovskite group.

It was first described in 1982 for an occurrence in a syenite intrusive in Tausonite Hill, Murun Massif, Olyokma-Chara Plateau, Sakha Republic, Yakutia, geologically part of the Aldan Shield, Eastern-Siberian Region, Russia. It was named for Russian geochemist Lev Vladimirovich Tauson (1917–1989). It has also been reported from a fenite dike associated with a carbonatite complex in Sarambi, Concepción Department, Paraguay. and in high pressure metamorphic rocks along the Kotaki River area of Honshu Island, Japan.
