= Tuolba =

River in Russia

- Mouth location in Yakutia, Russia

Location
- Country: Russia

Physical characteristics
- Mouth: Lena
  - coordinates: 60.6031°N 124.2434°E
- Length: 395 km (245 mi)
- Basin size: 15,800 km^{2} (6,100 sq mi)

Basin features
- Progression: Lena→ Laptev Sea

The Tuolba (Russian: Туолба) is a river of Sakha Republic, eastern Russia. It is 395 kilometres (245 mi) long, and has a drainage basin of 15,800 square kilometres (6,100 sq mi). Its source is in the Aldan Highlands and it is a right tributary of the Lena, The Tuolba runs through the village of Alexeyevka.

== See also ==
- List of rivers of Russia
