= Apsat (river) =

- Mouth location in Zabaykalsky Krai, Russia

Location
- Country: Russia

Physical characteristics
- Source: Kodar Range, Stanovoy Highlands
- Mouth: Chara
  - coordinates: 57.0348°N 118.5528°E
- Length: 105 km (65 mi)
- Basin size: 1,280 km^{2} (490 sq mi)

Basin features
- Progression: Chara→ Olyokma→ Lena→ Laptev Sea

The Apsat (Russian: Апсат) is a river in the Kodar Range, on the eastern side of Lake Baikal in Siberia, Russia. It is a left tributary of the Chara (Lena basin). It is 105 kilometres (65 mi) long, and has a drainage basin of 1,280 square kilometres (490 sq mi).

== See also ==
- List of rivers of Russia
