= Anabar Shield =

Coordinates: 70°30′N 108°0′E

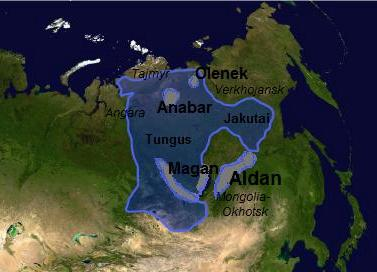
The Anabar Shield (larger pale blue dot) in the north of the Siberian Craton

The Anabar Shield (Russian: Анабарский щит) is a shield in Siberia. It is an exposed basement of the Siberian Craton. Together with the Aldan Shield to the southeast, the Anabar Shield is one of the main features of the craton.

On the surface it appears as an upland of moderate height, built of gneisses and crystalline shales folded in the Archean. There are numerous dislocations and intrusions. The outer zone has slightly undulated layers of Proterozoic deposits.

The Anabar Shield coincides geographically with the Anabar Plateau, located at the northern end of the Central Siberian Plateau, in the upper reaches of the Anabar, Olenyok and Kotuy rivers.

== See also ==
- Akitkan
- Arctica
- Birekte terrane
- List of shields and cratons
- Tunguska Basin
