= Adenylylsulfate—ammonia adenylyltransferase =

Class of enzymes

Adenylylsulfate-ammonia adenylyltransferase

Identifiers
- EC no.: 2.7.7.51
- CAS no.: 79121-94-1

Databases
- IntEnz: IntEnz view
- BRENDA: BRENDA entry
- ExPASy: NiceZyme view
- KEGG: KEGG entry
- MetaCyc: metabolic pathway
- PRIAM: profile
- PDB structures: RCSB PDB PDBe PDBsum
- Gene Ontology: AmiGO / QuickGO
Search
- PMC: articles
- PubMed: articles
- NCBI: proteins

Adenylylsulfate-ammonia adenylyltransferase (EC 2.7.7.51) is an enzyme that catalyzes the chemical reaction

5'-adenylyl sulfate
NH_{3}
H_{2}SO_{4}
adenosine 5'-phosphoramidate

The enzyme characterised from Chlorella converts 5'-adenylyl sulfate to adenosine 5'-phosphoramidat by reaction with ammonia. Sulfate is a byproduct. This enzyme activity has been reported to be a general property of fragile histidine triad proteins.

This enzyme is a transferase, specifically one transferring phosphorus-containing nucleotide groups (nucleotidyltransferases). The systematic name of this enzyme class is adenylyl-sulfate:ammonia adenylyltransferase. Other names in common use include APSAT, and adenylylsulfate:ammonia adenylyltransferase.
