= Olyokma, Amur Oblast =

Olyokma Олёкма
- Settlement
- Location within Amur Oblast Location within Russia
- Coordinates: 57°01′N 120°43′E
- Country: Russia
- Region: Amur Oblast
- District: Tyndinsky District
- Time zone: UTC+9:00

Olyokma (Russian: Олёкма) is a rural locality (a settlement) in Olyokminsky Selsoviet of Tyndinsky District, Amur Oblast, Russia. The population was 462 as of 2018. There is 1 street.

== Geography ==
Olyokma is located 446 km northwest of Tynda (the district's administrative centre) by road. Khani is the nearest rural locality.
