= Olyokma Nature Reserve =

Nature reserve in the Sakha Republic, Russia

- Russian: Олёкминский заповедник (Also: Olekminsky)
- IUCN category Ia (strict nature reserve)
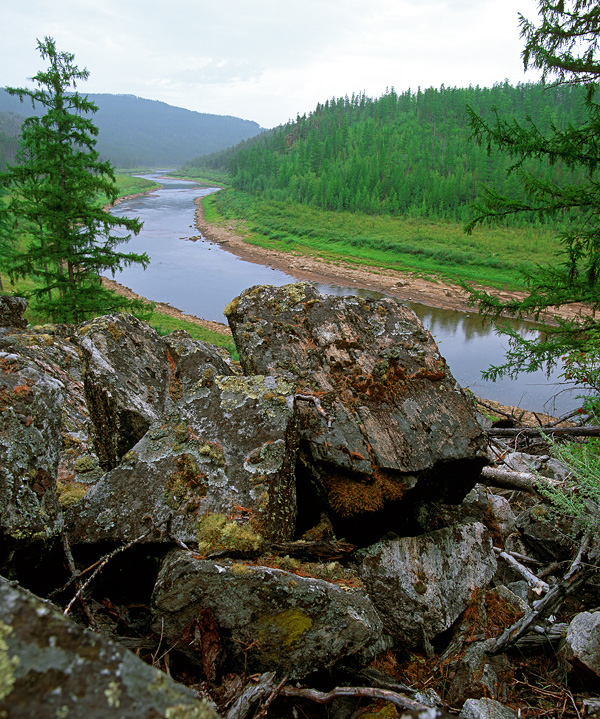
- Olyokma Zapovednik

- Location within Russia
- Location: Sakha Republic
- Nearest city: Olyokminsk
- Coordinates: 58°39′22″N 122°15′28″E
- Area: 847,102 hectares (2,093,235 acres; 3,271 sq mi)
- Established: 1984
- Governing body: Ministry of Natural Resources and Environment (Russia)
- Website: http://olekminskiy.ru/

Olyokma Nature Reserve (Russian: Олёкминский) (also Olekminsky) is a Russian 'zapovednik' (strict nature reserve) located south of the middle reaches of the Lena River on the right bank of its second largest tributary - the Olyokma River at the junction of the Aldan Highlands and the Olyokma-Chara Plateau in Olyokminsky District of the Sakha Republic (Yakutia). The area is remote and relatively undisturbed, being 80 km from a town.

== Topography ==
The region is in the foothills of southwest Yakutia, on the Aldan Highlands / Olyokma-Chara Plateau, an area cut by river valleys. The major rivers of the area are the Tuolby and Amga River. Within the borders of the reserve are 85 streams and rivers stretching from 3 to 110 km, acting as tributaries of the Olyokma, Tuolby, and Amga.

== Climate and Ecoregion ==
Olyokma is located in the East Siberian taiga ecoregion. The ecoregion covers the area between the Yenisei River and Lena River down to the Okhotsk Sea. Its northern border reaches the Arctic Circle, and its southern border reaches 52°N latitude. The dominant vegetation is light coniferous taiga with Dahurian larch Larix gmelini forming the canopy in areas with low snow cover. This ecoregion is rich in minerals.

The climate of Olyokma is Subarctic climate, without dry season (Köppen climate classification Subarctic climate (Dfc)). This climate is characterized by mild summers (only 1–3 months above 10 °C (50.0 °F)) and cold, snowy winters (coldest month below −3 °C (26.6 °F)). Snow begins in October in Olekminsky, and last on average 200 days. Average annual precipitation is 400–500 mm.

== Flora and fauna ==
The reserve is covered 88% by forest, mostly conifers. Some zoning is seen: above 1,000 meters are more tundra communities, in a belt at 900–1000 meters is a sub-taiga of Dahurian larch, and from 400–900 meters is larch-pine forest with alder and Dahurian rhododendron thickets. Olyokma is notable for relatively high levels of bidoversity: of the total 1,010 species of vascular plants in the East Siberian taiga ecoregion, 650 are found in Olyokma.

== Ecotourism ==
As a scientific nature reserve, the Olyokma Reserve is mostly closed to the general public, although scientists and those with 'environmental education' purposes can make arrangements with reserve management for visits. There are a few 'ecotourist' routes in the reserve that are made available to a limited number of school groups and ecotourists accompanied by reserve guides, and which require permits to be obtained in advance. The main office is in the city of Olekminsk.

== See also ==
- List of Russian Nature Reserves (class 1a 'zapovedniks')
