= Yuksporite =

Rare inosilicate mineral

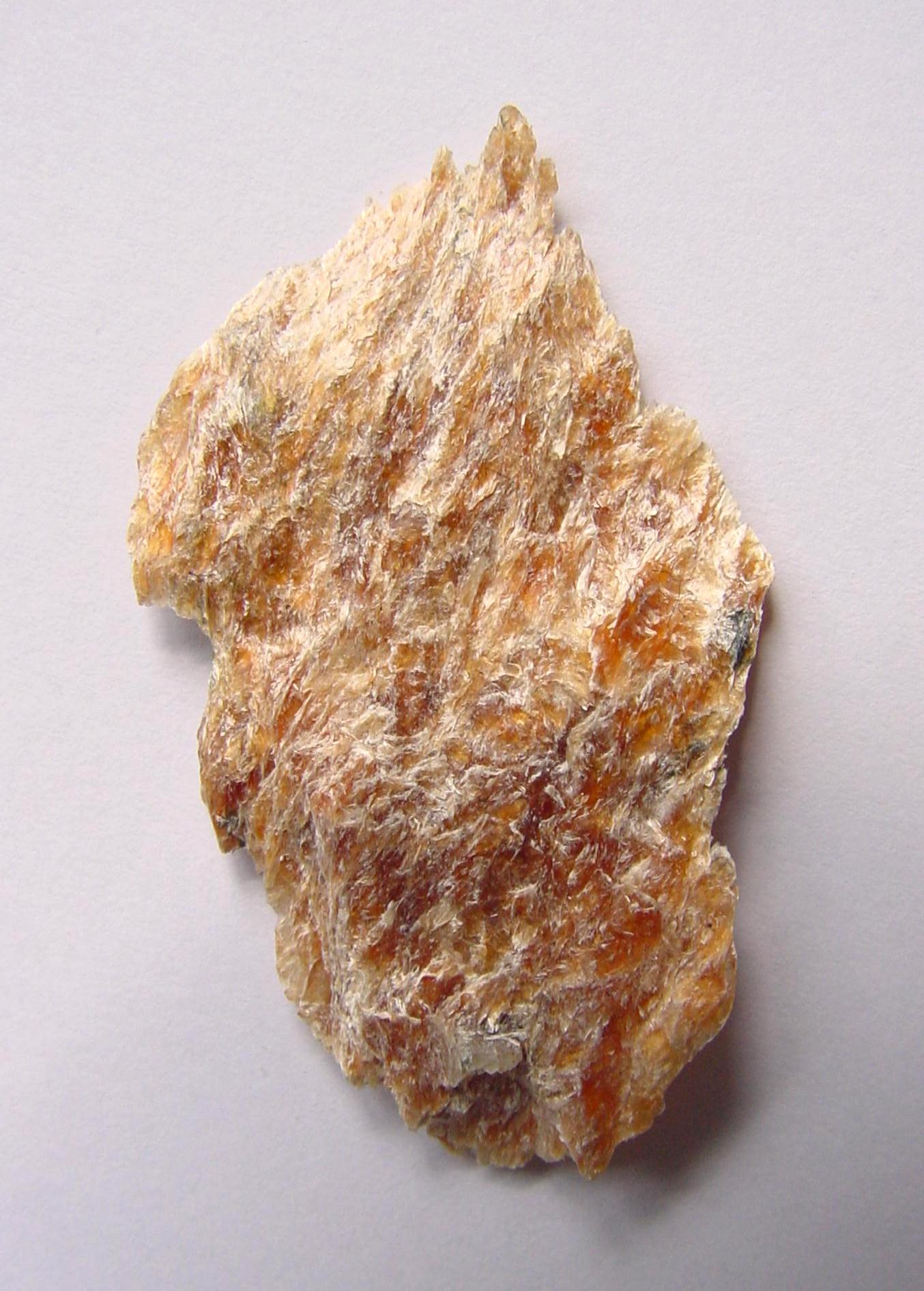
- Yuksporite from the Khibiny Massif, Kola Peninsula, Russia (4 cm across)

General
- Category: Inosilicates
- Formula: see text
- IMA symbol: Yks
- Strunz classification: 9.DG.95
- Dana classification: 66.3.1.5
- Crystal system: Monoclinic
- Crystal class: Prismatic (2/m) (same H-M symbol)
- Space group: P2/m

Identification
- Formula mass: 2,546.97 g/mol
- Color: Brownish pink to rose-red to straw-yellow
- Crystal habit: Fibrous, scaly or lamellar
- Mohs scale hardness: 4 1/2 to 5
- Luster: Vitreous, silky
- Streak: Nearly white to white
- Diaphaneity: Semitransparent
- Specific gravity: 3.05
- Optical properties: Biaxial
- Refractive index: n_{α} = 1.644, n_{γ} = 1.660
- Pleochroism: X pale rose-yellow, Y, Z rose-yellow
- Other characteristics: Barely detectable radioactivity

Yuksporite is a rare inosilicate mineral with double width, unbranched chains, and the complicated chemical formula K_{4}(Ca,Na)_{14}Sr_{2}Mn(Ti,Nb)_{4}(O,OH)_{4}(Si_{6}O_{17})_{2}(Si_{2}O_{7})_{3}(H_{2}O,OH)_{3}. It contains the relatively rare elements strontium, titanium and niobium, as well as the commoner metallic elements potassium, calcium, sodium and manganese. As with all silicates, it contains groups of linked silicon and oxygen atoms, as well as some associated water molecules.

Yuksporite is a member of the umbite group that has just two known members, umbite, K_{2}ZrSi>_{3}O_{9}·H_{2}O, and yuksporite. It was first reported in 1922, from nepheline syenite occurrences in the Kola Peninsula, Russia, and named by Alexander Fersman for the locality, near Mount Yukspor.

== Unit cell ==
Yuksporite was originally thought to be orthorhombic, space group unknown. In 2004, however, the structure was solved using synchrotron radiation and found to be monoclinic 2/m with space group P2_{1}/m. The monoclinic unit cell has two formula units per cell (Z = 2) and side lengths a = 7.126 Å, b = 24.913 Å and c = 17.075 Å, with the angle β between the a and c axes equal to 101.89°.

== Appearance ==
The mineral is brownish pink, rose pink or yellowish in color, with a silky to vitreous luster and a nearly white streak. It occurs in semi-transparent fibrous, scaly or lamellar aggregates up to 10 cm across.

== Properties ==
Yuksporite is a biaxial mineral, but most authors do not specify whether it is (+) or (-); the Handbook of Mineralogy gives it as (+). All agree, however, that the refractive indices are N_{x} = 1.644 and N_{z} = 1.660 (with N_{y} unspecified), which are larger than those for quartz, but similar to those for tourmaline. Yuksporite shows pleochroism, with X pale rose-yellow, and Y, Z rose-yellow. It has a hardness of 4 1/2 to 5, between fluorite and apatite, and specific gravity 3.05, similar to fluorite. It exhibits barely detectable radioactivity.

== Occurrence and associations ==
The type locality is the Hackman Valley, Yukspor Mt, Khibiny Massif, Murmanskaja Oblast', Northern Region, Russia, and type material is conserved at the Fersman Mineralogical Museum, Academy of Sciences, Moscow, Russia, catalogue number 25847. The only occurrences reported by Mindat.org are in Russia. At the Khibiny massif it occurs in veins in nepheline syenite associated with titanite, pectolite, astrophyllite, biotite and aegirine. At the Murun Massif in the Sakha Republic it is associated with aegirine, kalsilite, potassic feldspar, titanite, lamprophyllite, wadeite and tausonite.

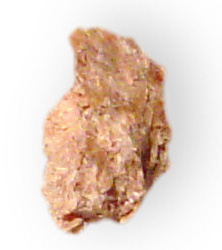
Yuksporite from Russia
