= Sredny Kalar =

Sredny Kalar Средний Калар
- Selo
- Location within Zabaykalsky Krai Location within Russia
- Coordinates: 55°51′N 117°22′E
- Country: Russia
- Region: Zabaykalsky Krai
- District: Kalarsky District
- Time zone: UTC+9:00

Sredny Kalar (Russian: Средний Калар) is a rural locality (a selo) in Kalarsky District, Zabaykalsky Krai, Russia. Population: 53 (2021 census); 62 (2010 census); 114 (2002 census); There are 2 streets in this selo.

== Geography ==
This rural locality is located 128 km from Chara (the district's administrative centre), 490 km from Chita (capital of Zabaykalsky Krai) and 4,977 km from Moscow.
