= Torgo (urban-type settlement) =

Torgo Торго
- Urban-type settlement

Other transcription(s)
  - Yakut: Торҕо
- Interactive map of Torgo
- Location of Torgo Torgo (Sakha Republic)
- Coordinates: 58°28′N 119°32′E
- Country: Russia
- Federal subject: Sakha Republic
- Administrative district: Olyokminsky District
- SettlementSelsoviet: Settlement of Torgo
- Founded: 1976
- Urban-type settlement status since: 1977

Population (2010 Census)
  - Total: 0
  - Estimate (2021): 0 )

Administrative status
  - Capital of: Settlement of Torgo

Municipal status
  - Municipal district: Olyokminsky Municipal District
  - Rural settlement: Tyansky Rural Settlement
- Time zone: UTC+
- Postal code: 678135
- OKTMO ID: 98641475056

Torgo population
- 2010 Census: 0
- 2002 Census: 97
- 1989 Census: 1,593
- 1979 Census: 1,417

Torgo (Russian: Торго; Yakut: Торҕо, Torğo) is an urban locality (an urban-type settlement) in Olyokminsky District of the Sakha Republic, Russia, located 387 kilometers (240 mi) from Olyokminsk, the administrative center of the district. It had no recorded population as of the 2010 Census.

== Geography ==
The settlement is located in the Olyokma-Chara Plateau, on the left bank of the Torgo, a tributary of the Tokko.

== History ==
Urban-type settlement status was granted to Torgo in 1977.

== Administrative and municipal status ==
Within the framework of administrative divisions, the urban-type settlement of Torgo is incorporated within Olyokminsky District as the Settlement of Torgo. Within the framework of municipal divisions, Torgo is a part of Tyansky Rural Settlement within Olyokminsky Municipal District.
