= Skalisty Golets (Stanovoy Range) =

Mountain in Russia

- Скалистый голец
- Location within Sakha Republic

Highest point
- Elevation: 2,412 m (7,913 ft)
- Coordinates: 55°51′N 130°43′E

Geography
- Location: Sakha Republic, Russia
- Parent range: Stanovoy Range

Skalisty Golets (Russian: Скалистый голец) is the highest peak in the Stanovoy Range, Russia.

The Skalisty Golets is a ‘’golets’’-type of mountain with a bald peak. Administratively it is located in the Sakha Republic (Yakutia) of the Russian Far East.

== See also ==
- List of mountains and hills of Russia
