= Skalisty Golets =

- Скалистый голец
- Location within Zabaykalsky Krai

Highest point
- Elevation: 2,520 m (8,270 ft)
- Prominence: 1,064 m (3,491 ft)
- Listing: Ribu
- Coordinates: 56°24′01″N 119°05′04″E

Geography
- Location: Zabaykalsky Krai, Russia
- Parent range: Kalar Range, Stanovoy Highlands

Skalisty Golets (Russian: Скалистый голец) is the highest peak in the Kalar Range, Stanovoy Highlands, Russia.

The Skalisty Golets is a ‘’golets’’-type of mountain with a bald peak. Administratively it is located in the Zabaykalsky Krai of the Russian Far East. The Kalar river flows at the base of the mountain in its upper course.

== See also ==
- List of mountains and hills of Russia
