= Corps of Military Topographers of the Russian Imperial Army =

- Russian: Корпус военных топографов Российской императорской армии
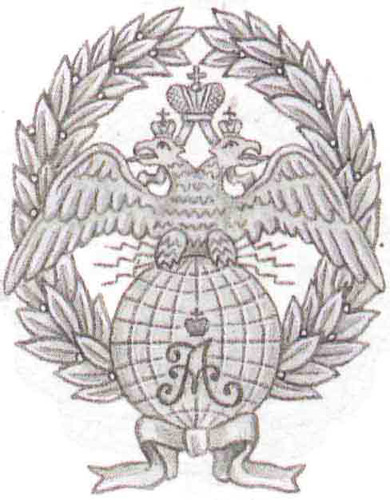
- Active: 1822—1917
- Country: Russia
- Type: Military Topography

Commanders
- Notable commanders: Friedrich von Schubert; Friedrich Wilhelm Rembert von Berg; Hans Karl von Diebitsch; Nikolay D. Artamonov

The Corps of Military Topographers of the Russian Imperial Army was a branch of the Imperial Russian Army with a long history dating back to the early 18th century.

== History ==
The Corps of Military Topographers was established in 1822 in order to centralize the carrying out of cartographic surveys on the territory of the Russian Empire under the leadership of the Military Topographic Depot. Its predecessor was the Quartermaster Unit that Peter the Great had organized in order to provide topographic support to the Imperial Russian Army in 1702.

Following the October 1917 Revolution the corps continued to exist initially under the same name until 1923, when it was renamed as the Military Topographic Service (Военно-Топографическую Службу) of the Red Army.

== See also ==
- Russian Hydrographic Service

== Literature ==
- Dolgov E.I., Sergeev S.V. Military Topographers of the Russian Army. - M .: ZAO "CDiPress", 2001 ISBN 5844300068
