= Tunguska Basin =

Sedimentary basin in Siberia

The Tunguska Basin is a sedimentary basin in Siberia.

== Geography ==
Much of the Siberian Traps Large Igneous Province is inside.

The area is about 400,000 square miles (1,000,000 km^{2}) in Krasnoyarsk Territory and Sakha Republic, between the Yenisei and Lena rivers. It contains a huge untapped coal reserve. Its main settlements there are Norilsk, Igarka, and Yeniseisk. The Tunguska rivers cross the basin. On June 30, 1908, near the Stony Tunguska River, the Tunguska Event took place.

== Geology ==
Boreholes in the Tunguska Basin indicate ubiquitous and abundant sills, having great lateral extension.

The Tunguska Basin makes up much of the Siberian Craton and has several sub-basins.

== See also ==
- Tunguska Plateau
