= Tinaksite =

Silicate mineral

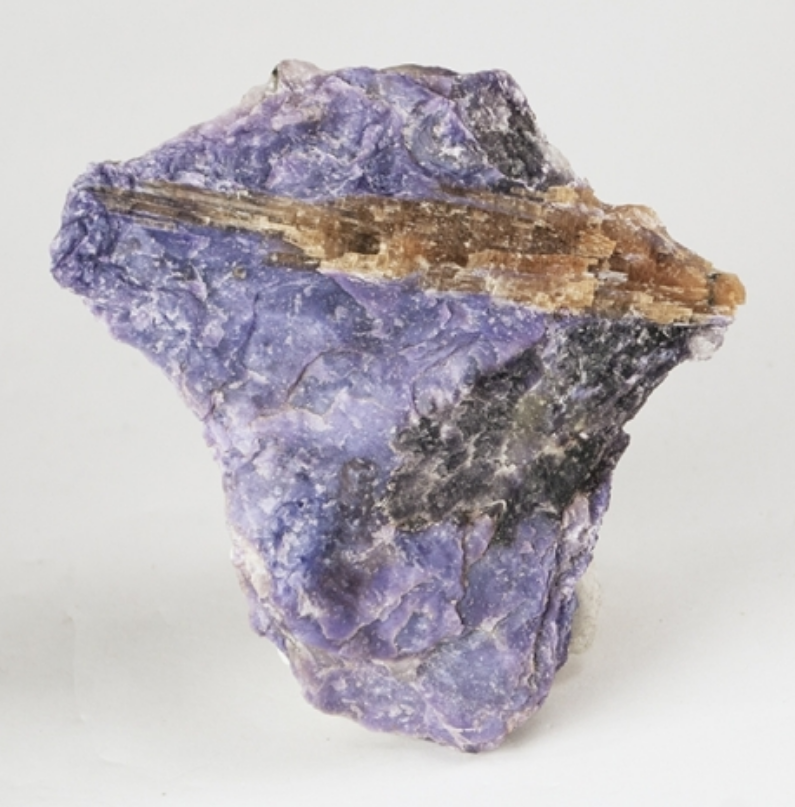
- Tinaksite (brown) and associated charoite (lilac).

General
- Category: Silicate mineral
- Formula: K_{2}Na(Ca,Mn^{2+})_{2}TiO[Si_{7}O_{18}(OH)]
- IMA symbol: Tnk
- Strunz classification: 9.DG.75
- Crystal system: Triclinic
- Crystal class: Pinacoidal (1̅) (same H-M symbol)
- Space group: P1̅

Identification
- Color: Pink, pale yellow, light brown
- Crystal habit: Fibrous, crystalline or prismatic, crystalline, or radial, crystalline
- Cleavage: Perfect in one direction, indistinct in one direction
- Mohs scale hardness: 6
- Luster: Vitreous to glassy
- Streak: White
- Diaphaneity: Transparent to translucent
- Specific gravity: 2.82
- Optical properties: Biaxial (+)
- Refractive index: nα = 1.593 nβ = 1.621 nγ = 1.666
- Birefringence: δ = 0.073

Tinaksite (chemical formula K_{2}Na(Ca,Mn^{2+})_{2}TiO[Si_{7}O_{18}(OH)]) is a mineral found in northern Russia. Tinaksite can be grayish-white, yellowish, orange, or brown, and it is often found in charoite. Its name is derived from its composition: titanium (Ti), sodium (Na) potassium (K) and silicon (Si). The International Mineralogical Association first recognized tinaksite as a mineral in 1965.
