= Tokko (river) =

- Mouth location in Yakutia, Russia

Location
- Country: Russia
- Federal subject: Yakutia

Physical characteristics
- Source: Udokan Range; Stanovoy Highlands
  - coordinates: 57°12′21″N 119°39′33″E
  - elevation: 1,369 m (4,491 ft)
- Mouth: Chara
  - coordinates: 59°50′54″N 120°22′25″E
  - elevation: 130 m (430 ft)
- Length: 446 km (277 mi)
- Basin size: 23,100 km^{2} (8,900 sq mi)
- Discharge
  - average: 220 m^{3}/s (7,800 cu ft/s)

Basin features
- Progression: Chara→ Olyokma→ Lena→ Laptev Sea

The Tokko (Russian: Токко) is a river in Yakutia, East Siberia, Russian Federation. It is the largest tributary of the Chara river in terms of length and area of its basin. The river is 446 kilometres (277 mi) long and has a drainage basin of 23,100 square kilometres (8,900 sq mi). It is navigable in its final stretch, 131 km (81 mi) from its confluence with the Chara. Tokko village is located by the river bank.

The Chara-Tokkinskaya group of deposits (Чара-Токкинская группа месторождений), the largest iron ore accumulation in Russia, is located in the Tokko basin. Rock art depictions of ancient hunters dating back to the 1st - 2nd millennia BC have been preserved on a limestone ridge rising 4 m (13 ft) to 18 m (59 ft) above the river's right bank 18 km (11 mi) from its mouth.

The waters of the Tokko are rich in fish, including grayling, lenok, taimen, pike and common dace, among other species.

== Course ==
The Tokko is a right tributary of the Chara, of the Lena basin. Its source is in a glacial lake located on the southeastern slopes of a nameless 2,025 m (6,644 ft) high peak of the Udokan Range, a subrange of the Stanovoy Highlands, very near the border of Transbaikalia. In its upper course the Tokko flows northwards across the Olyokma-Chara Plateau in the Olyokminsky District through a U-shaped valley bound by smooth mountains. At about 362 km (225 mi) from its mouth the Tokko enters a deep valley where it narrows to a maximum of 300 metres (980 ft) and forms rapids. 90 km (56 mi) further downstream, after the confluence of the Choruoda, one of its main tributaries, the Tokko enters a 1,500 metres (4,900 ft) wide floodplain where it slows down, divides into arms and forms meanders. Finally it joins the Chara 73 km (45 mi) from this river's mouth in the Olyokma.

The longest tributaries of the Tokko are the 145 km (90 mi) long Choruoda, The 70 km (43 mi) long Torgo and the 177 km (110 mi) long Teene (Тээнэ) from the right, and the 71 km (44 mi) long Kebekte, the 64 km (40 mi) long Upper Dzhege (Верхняя Джеге) and the 68 km (42 mi) long Ulakhan-Segeeleennekh (Улахан-Сэгэлээннээх) from the left. The river is frozen in most of its length between mid October and mid May, but there are places where polynyas form. There are about 1,700 lakes in the basin area of the Tokko.

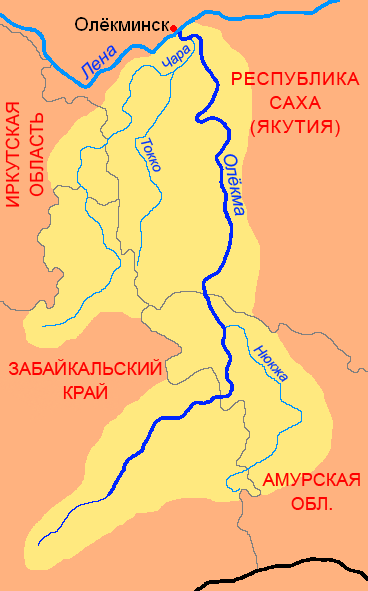
Olyokma basin with the Tokko in the upper part.

== See also ==
- List of rivers of Russia
