= Chara (river) =

Chara Yakut: Чаара
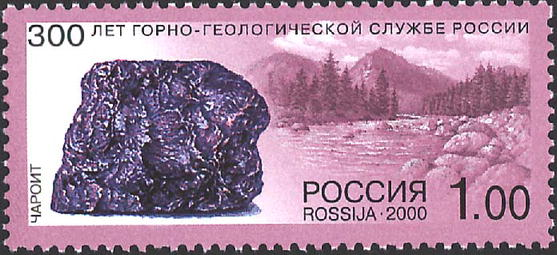
- View of the river and piece of charoite

- Location in the Sakha Republic, Russia

Location
- Country: Yakutia, Russia

Physical characteristics
- Source
  - location: Bolshoye Leprindo Lake
  - coordinates: 56°38′40″N 117°35′4″E
  - elevation: 975 m (3,199 ft)
- Mouth: Olyokma
  - coordinates: 60°19′10″N 120°52′28″E
  - elevation: 126 m (413 ft)
- Length: 851 km (529 mi)
- Basin size: 87,600 km^{2} (33,800 sq mi)
- Discharge
  - average: 638.83 m^{3}/s (22,560 cu ft/s)

Basin features
- Progression: Olyokma→ Lena→ Laptev Sea

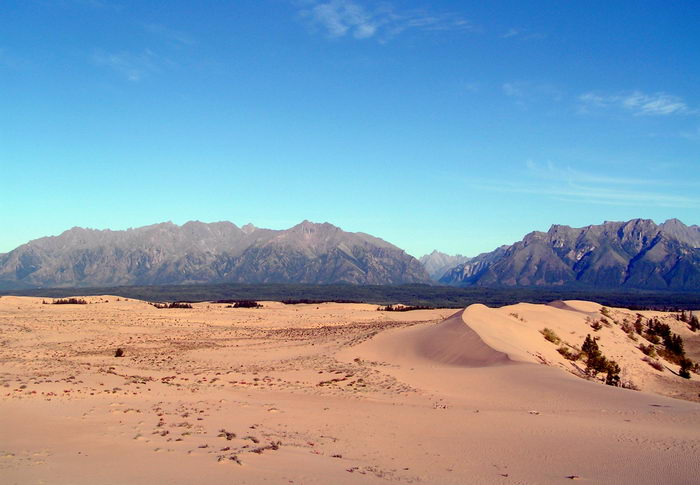
The Chara Sands, a small desert zone in Siberia, near the Chara River. The Kodar Mountains are in the background.

The Chara (Russian: Ча́ра; Yakut: Чаара, Çaara) is a left tributary of the Olyokma in Eastern Siberia, Russia. It is 851 kilometres (529 mi) long, and has a drainage basin of 87,600 square kilometres (33,800 sq mi).

Together with the Olyokma, river Chara gives its name to the Olyokma-Chara Plateau (Олёкмо-Чарское плоскогорье), located to the east of its eastern bank.

== History ==
The region is famous for a peculiar mountain where charoite has been mined for decades. This intensely purple mineral, named after the river, is only found here and was discovered in the 1940s when a rail tunnel was constructed. Part of the Russian governmental debt was paid in charoite and slabs of this now expensive ornamental material were stored in basements of houses of the Hungarian capital city, Budapest.

== Course ==
The Chara begins as an outflow of Bolshoye Leprindo lake in the Kodar Mountains, Stanovoy Highlands in northern Zabaykalsky Krai. It flows through the Chara Basin between the Kodar and Kalar Mountains, passing the Chara Sands, a 37 square kilometres (14 sq mi) area of active sand dunes. It joins the left bank of the Olyokma not far from its mouth in the Lena. The Chara has 103 tributaries over 10 km (6.2 mi) in length. The most important are the Apsat and the Zhuya from the left and the Tokko from the right. The Sen River flows into the left bank of the Chara from the northern end of lake Nichatka.

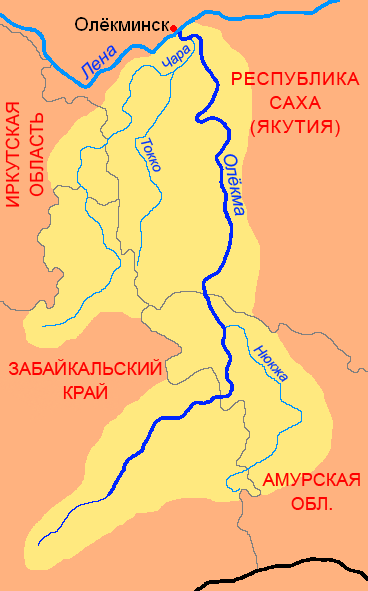
Basin of the Olyokma

== See also ==
- Charoite
- List of rivers of Russia
- Patom Highlands
