= Olyokma-Chara Plateau =

Mountain range in Russia

- Олёкмо-Чарское плоскогорье / Өлүөхүмэ-Чаара хаптал хайалаах сир
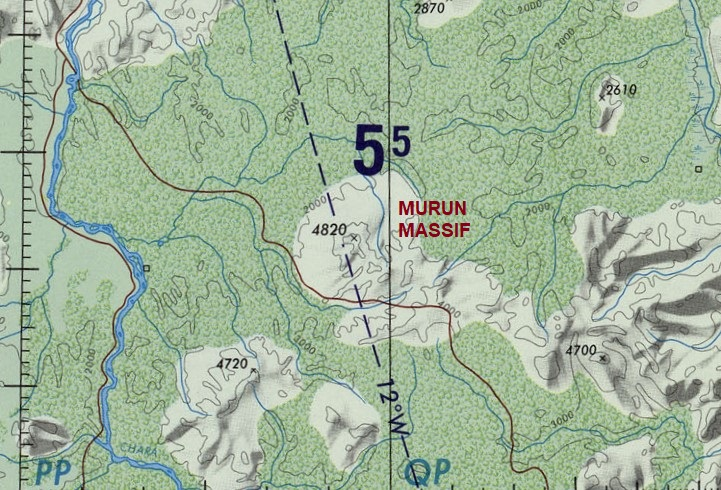
- Murun Massif map section, Olyokma-Chara Plateau

Highest point
- Peak: Murun
- Elevation: 1,452 m (4,764 ft)
- Coordinates: 58°22′32″N 118°55′30″E

Dimensions
- Length: 200 km (120 mi)
- Width: 180 km (110 mi)

Geography
- Location within Sakha Republic
- Country: Russia
- Federal subject: Sakha Republic, Irkutsk Oblast
- Range coordinates: 58°30′N 120°0′E
- Parent range: South Siberian System

Geology
- Rock age(s): Paleozoic, Precambrian
- Rock types: Limestone, metamorphic shale and Granite intrusions

Climbing
- Easiest route: from Chara

The Olyokma-Chara Plateau (Russian: Олёкмо-Чарское плоскогорье; Yakut: Өлүөхүмэ-Чаара хаптал хайалаах сир) is a mountainous area in the Sakha Republic and Irkutsk Oblast, Far Eastern Federal District, Russia. A small section is in Kalarsky District, northernmost Zabaykalsky Krai.

Charoite, a rare mineral, is found in the Murun Massif area of the plateau, rising between rivers Chara and Tokko.

== Geography ==
The Olyokma-Chara Plateau is located to the south of the Lena, at the southwestern end of the Sakha Republic in Olyokminsky District, and the eastern end of Irkutsk Oblast, Bodaybinsky District. The plateau is bound by the Chara River, a left tributary of the Olyokma river to the west and the Olyokma, a left tributary of the Lena, to the east. The Tokko River, the largest tributary of the Chara, crosses the uplands from south to north. To the south rises the Udokan Range of the Stanovoy Highlands and to the north the Lena Plateau. To the east rise the Aldan Highlands and to the west the Patom Highlands. The size of the plateau is roughly 180 kilometres (110 mi) from north to south, and 200 kilometres (120 mi) from east to west. There are vestiges of ancient glaciation throughout the plateau area.

The heights of the Olyokma-Chara Plateau are moderate, the average elevations are between 500 meters (1,600 ft) and 600 meters (2,000 ft), although higher in the southern fringes. Mountains tend to be flat-topped, the highest point is Murun, a 1,452 metres (4,764 ft) high summit.

The plateau is largely uninhabited. The settlement of Torgo, Olyokminsky District, was abandoned in 2010.

== Geology ==
Part of the Olyokma-Chara Plateau falls within the Aldan Shield geological region. The plateau is composed of the Lower Paleozoic limestones in its northern part, and in the southern by Precambrian metamorphic shales, with granite intrusions.

== Flora ==
The mountains of the highlands are covered by larch taiga in the lower and middle slopes. Siberian pine scrub and mountain tundra grow at higher altitudes.

== See also ==
- List of mountains and hills of Russia
- Olyokma Nature Reserve
