= Charoite =

Rare silicate mineral

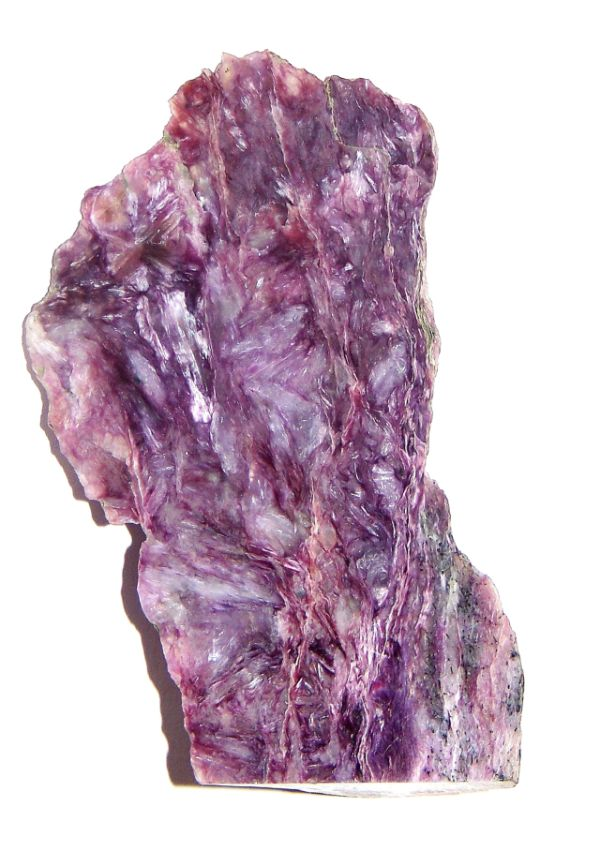

General
- Category: Silicate mineral
- Formula: K(Ca,Na)_{2}Si_{4}O_{10}(OH,F)•H_{2}O
- IMA symbol: Cha
- Crystal system: Monoclinic
- Crystal class: Prismatic (2/m) (same H-M symbol)
- Space group: P2_{1}/m

Identification
- Color: Violet, lilac, light brown
- Crystal habit: Fibrous, massive
- Cleavage: Good in three directions
- Fracture: Conchoidal
- Mohs scale hardness: 5 - 6
- Luster: Vitreous to pearly
- Streak: White
- Diaphaneity: Translucent
- Specific gravity: 2.54 - 2.58
- Optical properties: Biaxial (+)
- Refractive index: n_{α} = 1.550 n_{β} = 1.553 n_{γ} = 1.559
- Birefringence: 0.009
- Ultraviolet fluorescence: Weakly fluorescent
- Common impurities: Al, Fe, Mn, Sr, Ba
- Other characteristics: Radioactive 10.69% (K)

Charoite (/tʃæroʊ.aɪt/ CHAR-ow-ait) is a rare silicate mineral with the chemical composition K(Ca,Na)_{2}Si_{4}O_{10}(OH,F)•H_{2}O, first described in 1978. It is named after the Chara River, despite its being 70 kilometres (43 mi) away from the discovery place. When it was discovered, it was thought to be a fake, dyed purple to give it its striking appearance.

== Properties ==
Charoite is translucent lavender to purple in color with a pearly luster. Charoite is strictly massive in nature, and fractures are conchoidal. It has an unusual swirling, fibrous appearance, sometimes chatoyant, and that, along with its intense color, can lead many to believe at first that it is synthetic or enhanced artificially. Though reportedly discovered in the 1940s, it was not known to most of the world until its description in 1978. It is said to be opaque and unattractive when found in the field; a fact that may have contributed to its late recognition. Charoite consists of oxygen (43.75%), silicon (27.65%) and calcium (17.53%) mainly, but its composition includes potassium (10.69%) - which gives it its radioactive properties - and hydrogen (0.39%) as well. It has a barely detectable, 0.65% radioactivity concentration per Gamma Ray American Petroleum Institute Units.

Inclusions mainly come in the swirly patterns of the mineral. The black spots on some specimens are either augite or aegirine, the latter occurring in almost all charoites since they commonly grow together. Larger round greenish spots are feldspar. Lighter colored stones or ones with translucent areas are likely due to canasite. The yellowish brown spots are tinaksite, which was discovered at the same time as charoite was. Charoite's silky, fibrous structure results in a shimmery looking polished stone. Sometimes, the very white flashes are tiny white feldspar. Sugilites and charoites can be confused, as both are purple, and sugilite can have black and white inclusions, however sugilite lacks the swirling pattern that are present in charoite stones, and it also lacks the chatoyant effect.

== Occurrences ==
It has been reported only from the Aldan Shield, Sakha Republic, Siberia, Russia. It is found where a syenite of the Murun Massif has intruded into and altered limestone deposits producing a potassium feldspar metasomatite, and forms between 200 - 250 °C. Tinaksite, canasite and charoite are associated and black aegirine is also common where these three minerals grow. Common impurities include aluminium, iron, manganese, strontium and barium. Charoitite is a rock like lapis lazuli, but unlike the latter one, charoitite mostly consists of the mineral charoite.

== Gallery ==
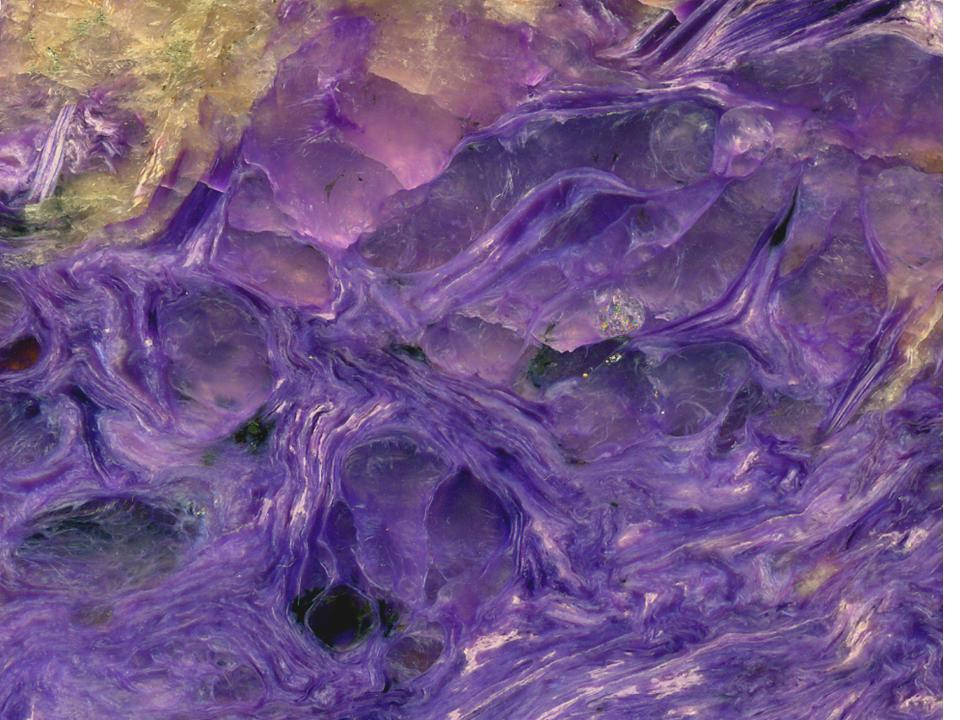
Charoitite, a charoite-dominated potassic metasomatite rock from the type area. Photo is 5.7 cm wide.

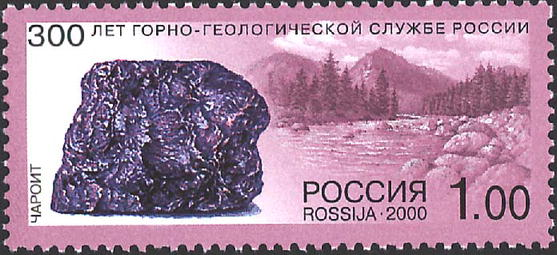
Charoite postage stamp, 2000, from a series commemorating "300 Years of Mining and Geological Service in Russia."

Polished charoite cabochons from Russia
