= Olyokma =

Olyokma Yakut: Өлүөхүмэ
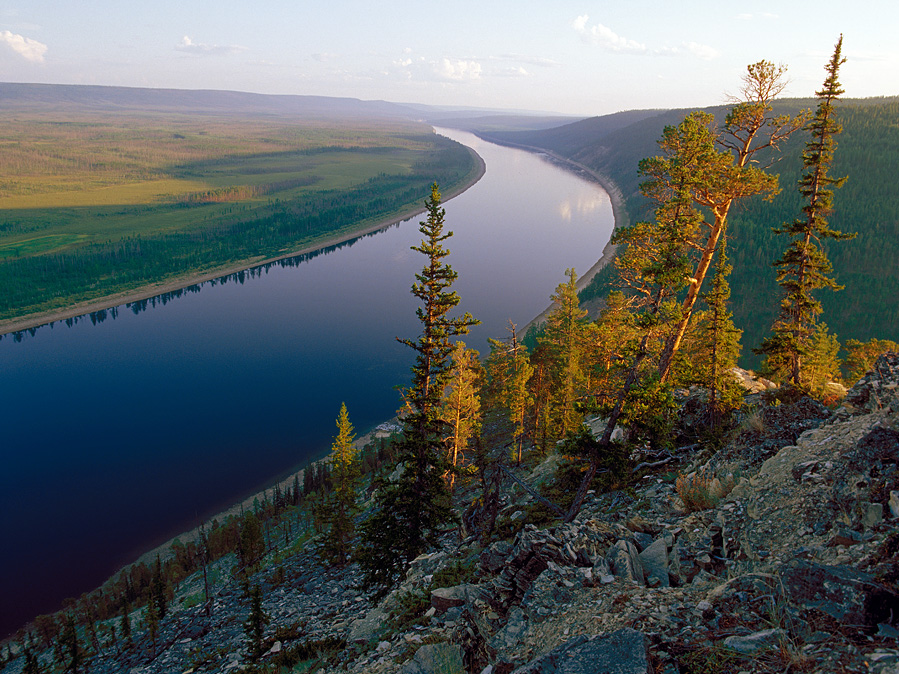
- View of the river

- Location in the Sakha Republic, Russia

Location
- Country: Russia
- Region: Zabaykalsky Krai, Yakutia

Physical characteristics
- Source: Muroy Range, Olyokma-Stanovik
  - location: Tungiro-Olyokminsky District, Zabaykalsky Krai
  - coordinates: 53°44′42″N 117°20′16″E
  - elevation: 1,500 m (4,900 ft)
- Mouth: Lena
  - location: Troitsk, Yakutia
  - coordinates: 60°22′27″N 120°40′40″E
  - elevation: 115 m (377 ft)
- Length: 1,436 km (892 mi)
- Basin size: 210,000 km^{2} (81,000 sq mi)
- Discharge
  - average: 2,110 m^{3}/s (75,000 cu ft/s)

Basin features
- Progression: Lena→ Laptev Sea

The Olyokma (Russian: Олёкма, Olyokma, IPA: [ɐˈlʲɵkmə]; Yakut: Өлүөхүмэ, Ölüöxüme) is a tributary of the Lena in eastern Siberia.

The river gives its name to the Olyokma-Chara Plateau, located to the west of its western bank.

== History ==
In the summer of 1631, Russian pioneer Pyotr Beketov entered the Olyokma during his first voyage down the Lena and in 1636 he founded the present-day city of Olyokminsk near the mouth of the river on the left bank of Lena.

Yerofey Khabarov used this river's route to travel from the Lena to the Amur during his mid-17th century expeditions. In the spring of 1649 Khabarov set off at his own expense up the Olyokma, then up its tributary the Tungir, and portaged to the Shilka River, reaching the upper Amur (Dauria) in early 1650.

== Course ==
The river is 1,436 kilometres (892 mi) long, and has a drainage basin of 210,000 square kilometres (81,000 sq mi). The Olyokma rises in the Muroy Range, Olyokma-Stanovik Highlands (Олёкминский Становик), west of Mogocha. It flows through remote terrain and cuts across the Kalar Range of the Stanovoy Highlands through a narrow valley. Further north, it bends around the eastern end of the Udokan Range and flows roughly north before joining the Lena near Olyokminsk.

To the west flows the Vitim, to the south the Shilka and Amur, and to the east the upper Aldan. Its main tributaries are the Tungir, the Nyukzha and the Chara —with its tributary the Tokko.

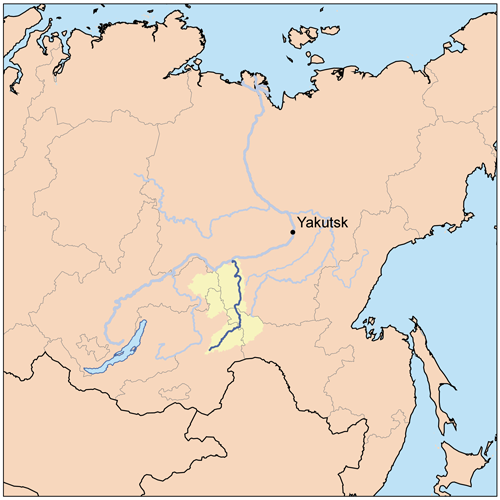
River location

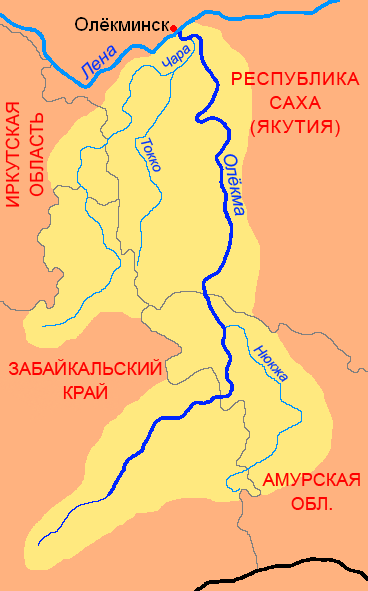
Olyokma basin.

== See also ==
- List of rivers of Russia
- Olyokma Nature Reserve
