= Zabaykalye constituency =

Russian legislative constituency

Zabaykalye single-member constituency
- Constituency of the Russian State Duma
- Deputy: Marina Sekerzhitskaya; United Russia
- Federal subject: Zabaykalsky Krai
- Districts: Aginskoye, Aginsky, Akshinsky, Alexandrovo-Zavodsky, Baleysky, Borzinsky, Chernyshevsky, Chita, Chitinsky, Duldurginsky, Gazimuro-Zavodsky, Gorny, Kalarsky, Kalgansky, Karymsky, Khiloksky, Krasnochikoysky, Krasnokamensky, Kyrinsky, Mogochinsky, Mogoytuysky, Nerchinsko-Zavodsky, Nerchinsky, Olovyanninsky, Ononsky, Petrovsk-Zabaykalsky, Petrovsk-Zabaykalsky District, Priargunsky, Shelopuginsky, Shilkinsky, Sretensky, Tungiro-Olyokminsky, Tungokochensky, Ulyotovsky, Zabaykalsky
- Voters: 733,046 (2026)

The Zabaykalye constituency (No.47 (Note: Chita constituency No.188 in 1993-2007, Chita constituency No.43 in 2016–2026)) is a Russian legislative constituency in Zabaykalsky Krai. The constituency the entire territory of Zabaykalsky Krai.

The constituency has been represented since 2026 by United Russia deputy Marina Sekerzhitskaya, former acting Minister of Education of Zabaykalsky Krai and daughter of former Chita mayor Anatoly Mikhalyov, who defeated Dauria constituency one-term A Just Russia incumbent Yury Grigoriev.

== Boundaries ==
1993–2007 Chita constituency: Akshinsky District, Chita, Chitinsky District, Gorny, Kalarsky District, Khiloksky District, Krasnochikoysky District, Kyrinsky District, Petrovsk-Zabaykalsky, Petrovsk-Zabaykalsky District, Tungiro-Olyokminsky District, Tungokochensky District, Uletovsky District
The constituency covered northern and western Chita Oblast, including the oblast capital Chita and the town of Petrovsk-Zabaykalsky.

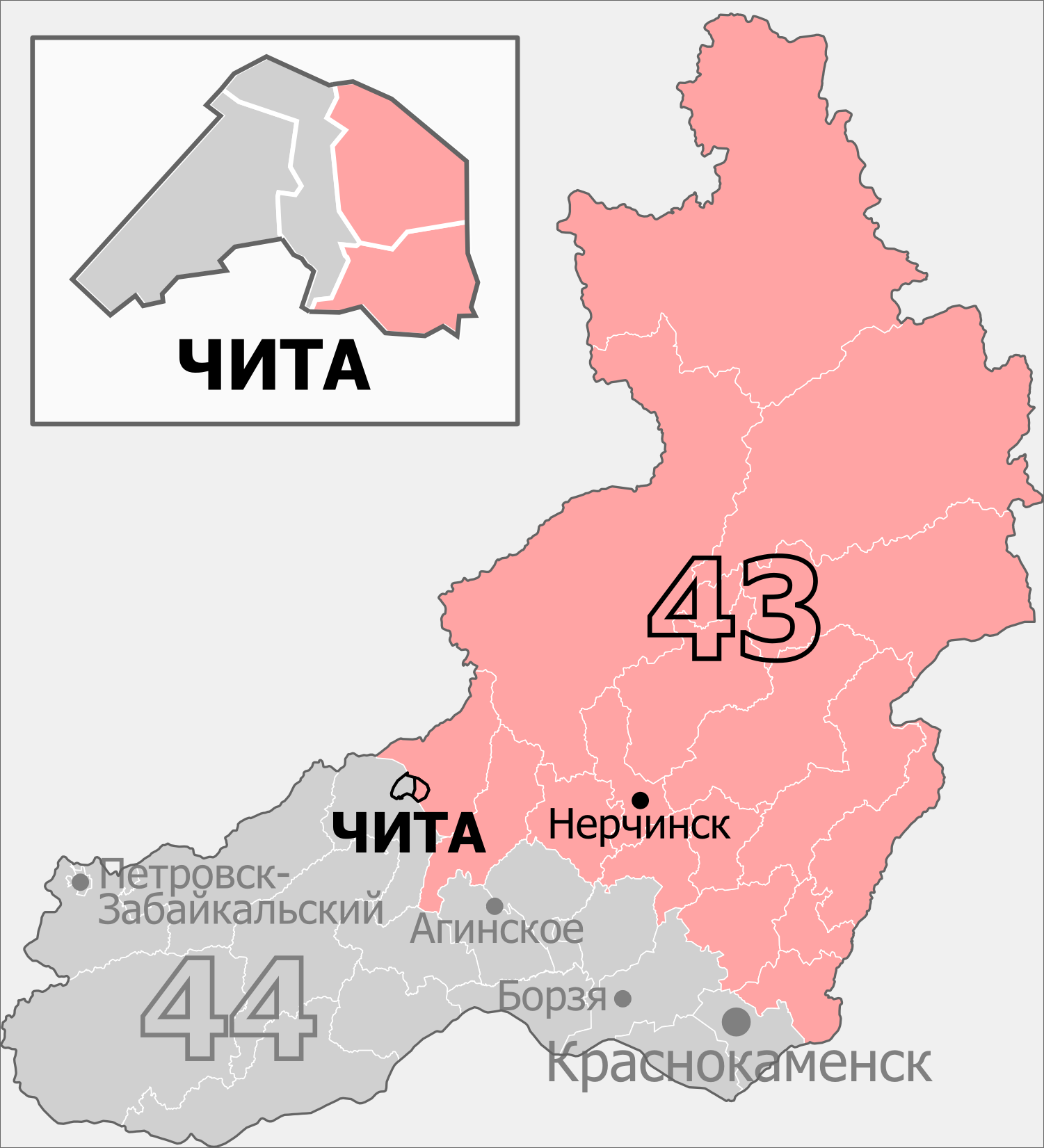
Constituency boundaries from 2016 to 2026

2016–2026 Chita constituency: Alexandrovo-Zavodsky District, Baleysky District, Chernyshevsky District, Chita (Ingodinsky, Central), Chitinsky District (Atamanovka, Makkaveyevskoye, Novokruchininsky, Novotroitskoye, Shishkinskoye, Smolenskoye, Verkh-Chitinskoye), Gazimuro-Zavodsky District, Kalarsky District, Kalgansky District, Karymsky District, Mogochinsky District, Nerchinsko-Zavodsky District, Nerchinsky District, Priargunsky District, Shelopuginsky District, Shilkinsky District, Sretensky District, Tungiro-Olyokminsky District, Tungokochensky District
The constituency was re-created for the 2016 election in Zabaykalsky Krai which was created by the merger of Chita Oblast and Agin-Buryat Autonomous Okrug in 2008. The constituency retained part of Chita and northern Zabaykalsky Krai, losing its western portion to Dauria constituency. The constituency gained eastern part of Zabaykalsky Krai from the former Borzya constituency.

2026–present: Aginskoye, Aginsky District, Akshinsky District, Alexandrovo-Zavodsky District, Baleysky District, Borzinsky District, Chernyshevsky District, Chita, Chitinsky District, Duldurginsky District, Gazimuro-Zavodsky District, Gorny, Kalarsky District, Kalgansky District, Karymsky District, Khiloksky District, Krasnochikoysky District, Krasnokamensky District, Kyrinsky District, Mogochinsky District, Mogoytuysky District, Nerchinsko-Zavodsky District, Nerchinsky District, Olovyanninsky District, Ononsky District, Petrovsk-Zabaykalsky, Petrovsk-Zabaykalsky District, Priargunsky District, Shelopuginsky District, Shilkinsky District, Sretensky District, Tungiro-Olyokminsky District, Tungokochensky District, Ulyotovsky District, Zabaykalsky District
After the 2025 redistricting Zabaykalsky Krai lost one of its two constituencies, so both Chita and Dauria constituencies were merged into a single "Zabaykalye constituency", covering the entirety of Zabaykalsky Krai.

== Members elected ==
Election	Member	Party
1993	Sergey Markidonov (Note: killed in November 1995 while campaigning for re-election)	Independent
1995	Viktor Kurochkin	Independent
1999	Viktor Voytenko	Independent
2003	Viktor Voytenko	People's Party
2007	Proportional representation - no election by constituency	
2011	Proportional representation - no election by constituency	
2016	Nikolay Govorin	United Russia
2021	Aleksandr Skachkov	United Russia
2026	Marina Sekerzhitskaya	United Russia

== Election results ==
=== 1993 ===
==== Declared candidates ====
- Vladimir Afanasyev (Independent), businessman
- Vladimir Bogatov (LDPR), agriculture businessman
- Ivan Bolshakov (Independent), tekhnikum director
- Irina Goncharova (RDDR), expert for the Presidential Envoy to Chita Oblast
- Sergey Markidonov (Independent), Chairman of the Chita Oblast Property Fund (1991–present)
- Namzhil Tsybikov (Independent), Chita State Academy of Medicine department of pathophysiology head

==== Results ====
Summary of the 12 December 1993 Russian legislative election in the Chita constituency
Candidate	Party	Votes	%
Sergey Markidonov	Independent	39,670	20.36%
Namzhil Tsybikov	Independent	28,988	14.88%
Ivan Bolshakov	Independent	25,947	13.32%
Vladimir Afanasyev	Independent	21,744	11.16%
Irina Goncharova	Russian Democratic Reform Movement	16,776	8.61%
Vladimir Bogatov	Liberal Democratic Party	16,026	8.22%
against all		29,699	15.24%
Total		194,851	100%

=== 1995 ===
==== Declared candidates ====
- Vladimir Bogatov (LDPR), agriculture businessman, 1993 candidate for this seat
- Erast Galumov (Independent), pension fund president, retired Soviet Army colonel
- Viktor Kanin (Independent), attorney
- Vladimir Khomyakov (Derzhava), energy businessman
- Mikhail Kostromin (KRO), Chita State Technical University department head
- Viktor Kurochkin (Independent), Member of Federation Council (1994–present)
- Oleg Ladygin (Independent), Chief of Transbaikal Railway Division
- Olga Michudo (Independent), Member of Chita Oblast Duma (1994–present), Chita city polyclinic chief doctor
- Pyotr Suturin (PPR–ST), former People's Deputy of Russia (1990–1993), union leader
- Namzhil Tsybikov (NDR), Chita State Academy of Medicine department of pathophysiology head, 1993 candidate for this seat

==== Withdrawn candidates ====
- Sergey Markidonov (Independent), incumbent Member of State Duma (1994–1995) (murdered on November 26, 1995)

==== Results ====
Summary of the 17 December 1995 Russian legislative election in the Chita constituency
Candidate	Party	Votes	%
Viktor Kurochkin	Independent	57,261	21.90%
Pyotr Suturin	Trade Unions and Industrialists – Union of Labour	37,817	14.46%
Vladimir Bogatov	Liberal Democratic Party	35,497	13.58%
Erast Galumov	Independent	32,502	12.43%
Namzhil Tsybikov	Our Home – Russia	21,647	8.28%
Olga Michudo	Independent	19,944	7.63%
Oleg Ladygin	Independent	15,449	5.91%
Viktor Kanin	Independent	5,472	2.09%
Mikhail Kostromin	Congress of Russian Communities	4,593	1.76%
Vladimir Khomyakov	Derzhava	3,964	1.52%
against all		22,326	8.54%
Total		261,454	100%

=== 1999 ===
==== Declared candidates ====
- Aleksandr Barinov (Nikolayev–Fyodorov Bloc), advisor to Governor of Chita Oblast Ravil Geniatulin
- Vladimir Bogatov (LDPR), Member of State Duma (1996–present), 1993 and 1995 candidate for this seat, 1996 gubernatorial candidate
- Igor Kolkutin (Independent), businessman
- Viktor Kurochkin (Independent), incumbent Member of State Duma (1996–present), 1996 gubernatorial candidate
- Olga Michudo (Independent), Member of Chita Oblast Duma (1994–present), Chita city polyclinic chief doctor, 1995 candidate for this seat
- Viktor Ostanin (Independent), Chief of FSB Regional Office (1993–present), FSB major general
- Valery Torgayev (Independent), businessman
- Vitaly Vishnyakov (Independent), Chairman of the Chita Oblast Duma (1994–present)
- Viktor Voytenko (Independent), Deputy Minister of Railways of Russia (1999–present), retired FSB colonel general
- Aleksandr Zhdanov (Independent), Member of Chita Oblast Duma (1996–present)

==== Did not file ====
- Aleksandr Andreyev (Independent)
- Vladimir Kosygin (DN)
- Denis Logunov (Independent)
- Vladimir Plotnikov (Independent)
- Vyacheslav Tolkalin (Yabloko), journalist, playwright
- Leonid Volchek (Independent)

==== Results ====
Summary of the 19 December 1999 Russian legislative election in the Chita constituency
Candidate	Party	Votes	%
Viktor Voytenko	Independent	48,661	19.85%
Vitaly Vishnyakov	Independent	40,445	16.50%
Viktor Ostanin	Independent	36,800	15.01%
Viktor Kurochkin (incumbent)	Independent	33,871	13.81%
Vladimir Bogatov	Liberal Democratic Party	28,786	11.74%
Valery Torgayev	Independent	9,374	3.82%
Olga Michudo	Independent	9,362	3.82%
Aleksandr Barinov	Andrey Nikolayev and Svyatoslav Fyodorov Bloc	5,627	2.29%
Igor Kolkutin	Independent	3,117	1.27%
Aleksandr Zhdanov	Independent	2,622	1.07%
against all		22,202	9.05%
Total		245,192	100%

=== 2003 ===
Results by district: Viktor Voytenko: 30–40% 40–50%; Anatoly Romanov: 20–30% 30–40% 40–50%; Viktor Ostanin: 20–30% 30–40%

==== Declared candidates ====
- Irina Glazyrina (Yabloko), Chita Institute of Natural Resources sector head
- Viktor Grigoryev (Independent), agriculture businessman
- Yury Nikonov (LDPR), aide to State Duma member
- Viktor Ostanin (Independent), First Deputy Chairman of the Chita Oblast Duma (2000–present), 1999 candidate for this seat
- Vladimir Plakin (KPE), pensioner
- Anatoly Romanov (United Russia), Member of Chita Oblast Duma (2000–present)
- Viktor Voytenko (NPRF), incumbent Member of State Duma (2000–present), 2000 gubernatorial candidate
- Andrey Zhidkov (Independent), Member of Chita City Duma (2001–present), pharmaceutical businessman

==== Did not file ====
- Nairi Marabiyan (DPR), construction engineer
- Sergey Rybakov (Independent), military base deputy chief of staff

==== Results ====
Summary of the 7 December 2003 Russian legislative election in the Chita constituency
Candidate	Party	Votes	%
Viktor Voytenko (incumbent)	People's Party	51,101	25.32%
Anatoly Romanov	United Russia	49,290	24.42%
Viktor Ostanin	Independent	43,698	21.65%
Yury Nikonov	Liberal Democratic Party	11,200	5.55%
Irina Glazyrina	Yabloko	7,896	3.91%
Andrey Zhidkov	Independent	6,448	3.20%
Vladimir Palkin	Conceptual Party "Unity"	3,069	1.52%
Yury Grigoryev	Independent	2,517	1.25%
against all		23,343	11.57%
Total		202,205	100%

=== 2016 ===
==== Declared candidates ====
- Valery Afitsinsky (A Just Russia), Member of Chita City Duma (2014–present), economics associate professor
- Nikolay Govorin (United Russia), Member of State Duma (2015–present)
- Aleksandr Katushev (Rodina), Member of Chita City Duma (2014–present), municipal laundry director
- Vyacheslav Pimenov (CPCR), retired militsiya colonel, perennial candidate
- Vladimir Pozdnyakov (CPRF), Member of State Duma (2011–present)
- Vyacheslav Ushakov (Patriots of Russia), Member of Legislative Assembly of Zabaykalsky Krai (2013–present)
- Yury Volkov (LDPR), Member of Legislative Assembly of Zabaykalsky Krai (2013–present)

==== Did not file ====
- Svetlana Bobovskaya (Independent), industrial executive
- Kristina Kireyeva (Independent), unemployed

==== Declined ====
- Aleksey Saklakov (United Russia), Member of Legislative Assembly of Zabaykalsky Krai (2013–present) (lost the primary)

==== Results ====
Summary of the 18 September 2016 Russian legislative election in the Chita constituency
Candidate	Party	Votes	%
Nikolay Govorin	United Russia	84,582	54.56%
Yury Volkov	Liberal Democratic Party	18,939	12.22%
Vladimir Pozdnyakov	Communist Party	15,031	9.70%
Vyacheslav Ushakov	Patriots of Russia	10,089	6.51%
Valery Afitsinsky	A Just Russia	8,454	5.45%
Vyacheslav Pimenov	Communists of Russia	6,955	4.49%
Aleksandr Katushev	Rodina	3,475	2.24%
Total		155,016	100%

=== 2021 ===
==== Declared candidates ====
- Valery Afitsinsky (The Greens), former Member of Chita City Duma (2014–2019), agricultural executive, 2016 A Just Russia candidate for this seat
- Boris Basakin (New People), businessman
- Anatoly Pichugin (RPPSS), Russian Post regional office executive
- Viktor Sheremetyev (Rodina), former Member of Chita City Duma (2014–2019)
- Georgy Shilin (LDPR), Member of Legislative Assembly of Zabaykalsky Krai (2013–present)
- Aleksandr Skachkov (United Russia), Chief of the Transbaikal Railway (2017–present)
- Yelena Titova (CPRF), Member of Chitinsky District Council (2018–present)
- Yury Volkov (SR–ZP), Member of State Duma (2016–present), 2016 LDPR candidate for this seat

==== Declined ====
- Nikolay Govorin (United Russia), incumbent Member of State Duma (2015–present) (lost the primary)
- Aleksandr Zakondyrin (United Russia), former chairman of the Green Alliance party (2015–2019), 2018 Moscow mayoral candidate (lost the primary, ran as The Greens candidate in the Dauria constituency)

==== Results ====
Summary of the 17-19 September 2021 Russian legislative election in the Chita constituency
Candidate	Party	Votes	%
Aleksandr Skachkov	United Russia	57,995	38.48%
Yelena Titova	Communist Party	28,728	19.06%
Yury Volkov	A Just Russia — For Truth	16,486	10.94%
Boris Basakin	New People	12,480	8.28%
Georgy Shilin	Liberal Democratic Party	10,233	6.79%
Anatoly Pichugin	Party of Pensioners	8,234	5.46%
Valery Afitsinsky	The Greens	6,036	4.00%
Viktor Sheremetyev	Communists of Russia	3,025	2.01%
Total		150,733	100%

=== 2026 ===
==== Declared candidates ====
- Aleksandr Grigoryev (PPD), unemployed
- Yury Grigoriev (A Just Russia), incumbent Member of State Duma (2021–present) (Note: redistricted from Dauria constituency), 2024 gubernatorial candidate
- Aleksandr Kadirov (New People), businessman
- Olga Murzova (RPPSS), pensioner
- Vladimir Pranitsky-Kantemir (The Greens), war correspondent, 2016 Independent candidate in the Dauria constituency
- Marina Sekerzhitskaya (United Russia), acting Minister of Education of Zabaykalsky Krai (2023–present)
- Pavel Selyayev (LDPR), security executive
- Maria Shibayeva (CPCR), nonprofit director
- Maksim Shipitsyn (CPRF), former First Deputy Prosecutor of Zabaykalsky Krai (2009–2021), 2024 gubernatorial candidate
- Aleksandr Zhdanov (Yabloko), lawyer

==== Did not file ====
- Andrey Shcherbakov (Independent), businessman, 2024 gubernatorial candidate

==== Declined ====
- Andrey Gurulyov (United Russia), Member of State Duma (2021–present) (lost the primary)
- Aleksandr Skachkov (United Russia), incumbent Member of State Duma (2021–present) (lost the primary)
- Baldan Tsydypov (United Russia), Russian Army senior lieutenant, Hero of Russia (2022) (won the primary, running on the party list)
- Dmitry Vinogradsky (United Russia), Deputy Chairman of the Legislative Assembly of Zabaykalsky Krai (2023–present), Member of the Legislative Assembly (2018–present) (lost the primary)

==== Results ====
Summary of the 18-20 September 2026 Russian legislative election in the Zabaykalye constituency
Candidate	Party	Votes	%
Marina Sekerzhitskaya	United Russia	102,179	33.54%
Yury Grigoriev (incumbent)	A Just Russia	28,550	9.37%
Maksim Shipitsyn	Communist Party	27,115	8.90%
Pavel Selyayev	Liberal Democratic Party	26,873	8.82%
Aleksandr Kadirov	New People	22,682	7.44%
Aleksandr Zhdanov	Yabloko	18,311	6.01%
Maria Shibayeva	Communists of Russia	17,730	5.82%
Olga Murzova	Party of Pensioners	17,187	5.64%
Aleksandr Grigoryev	Party of Direct Democracy	15,972	5.24%
Vladimir Pranitsky-Kantemir	The Greens	13,007	4.27%
Total		304,678	100%
