= Alexander Skachkov =

Russian politician (born 1960)

- Александр Скачков

Member of the State Duma for Zabaykalsky Krai
- Incumbent
- Assumed office 12 October 2021
- Preceded by: Nikolay Govorin
- Constituency: Chita (No. 43)

Personal details
- Born: 21 November 1960 (age 65) Yerofey Pavlovich, Skovorodinsky District, Amur Oblast, Russian SFSR, USSR
- Party: United Russia
- Education: Far Eastern State Transport University

Alexander Anatolievich Skachkov (Russian: Александр Анатольевич Скачков; born November 21, 1960, in Yerofey Pavlovich, Skovorodinsky District) is a Russian political figure, deputy of the 8th State Duma.

From 2003 to 2004, Skachkov was the head of the East Siberian Railway. In 2011, he was appointed head of the East Siberian Directorate of Infrastructure of the Central Directorate of Infrastructure. From 2017 to 2021, he was the head of the Trans–Baikal Railway. In 2019, Skachkov became a member of the United Russia. Since September 2021, he has served as deputy of the 8th State Duma.

== Sanctions ==
He was sanctioned by the UK government in 2022 in relation to the Russo-Ukrainian War.
