= Nalgekan =

Nalgekan Налгекан
- Settlement
- Location within Zabaykalsky Krai Location within Russia
- Coordinates: 52°45′N 116°51′E
- Country: Russia
- Region: Zabaykalsky Krai
- District: Chernyshevsky District
- Time zone: UTC+9:00

Nalgekan (Russian: Налгекан) is a rural locality (a settlement) in Chernyshevsky District, Zabaykalsky Krai, Russia. Population: 32 (2021 census); 29 (2010 census); 64 (2002 census); There is 1 street in this settlement.

== Geography ==
This rural locality is located 29 km from Chernyshevsk (the district's administrative centre), 240 km from Chita (capital of Zabaykalsky Krai) and 5,341 km from Moscow. Kumakanda is the nearest rural locality.
