= Bushuley =

Bushuley Бушулей
- Selo
- Location within Zabaykalsky Krai Location within Russia
- Coordinates: 52°44′N 117°16′E
- Country: Russia
- Region: Zabaykalsky Krai
- District: Chernyshevsky District
- Time zone: UTC+9:00

Bushuley (Russian: Бушулей) is a rural locality (a selo) in Chernyshevsky District, Zabaykalsky Krai, Russia. Population: 243 (2021 census); 395 (2010 census); There are 6 streets in this selo.

== Geography ==
This rural locality is located 30 km from Chernyshevsk (the district's administrative centre), 266 km from Chita (capital of Zabaykalsky Krai) and 5,373 km from Moscow. Zhiriken is the nearest rural locality.
