= Ikshitsa =

Ikshitsa Икшица
- Selo
- Location within Zabaykalsky Krai Location within Russia
- Coordinates: 52°28′N 117°11′E
- Country: Russia
- Region: Zabaykalsky Krai
- District: Chernyshevsky District
- Time zone: UTC+9:00

Ikshitsa (Russian: Икшица) is a rural locality (a selo) in Chernyshevsky District, Zabaykalsky Krai, Russia. Population: 234 (2021 census); 260 (2010 census); There are 6 streets in this selo.

== Geography ==
This rural locality is located 14 km from Chernyshevsk (the district's administrative centre), 255 km from Chita (capital of Zabaykalsky Krai) and 5,403 km from Moscow. Poselskoye is the nearest rural locality.
