= Stary Olov =

Stary Olov Старый Олов
- Selo
- Location within Zabaykalsky Krai Location within Russia
- Coordinates: 52°27′N 116°39′E
- Country: Russia
- Region: Zabaykalsky Krai
- District: Chernyshevsky District
- Time zone: UTC+9:00

Stary Olov (Russian: Старый Олов) is a rural locality (a selo) in Chernyshevsky District, Zabaykalsky Krai, Russia. Population: 582 (2021 census); 853 (2010 census); There are 4 streets in this selo.

== Geography ==
This rural locality is located 25 km from Chernyshevsk (the district's administrative centre), 220 km from Chita (capital of Zabaykalsky Krai) and 5,369 km from Moscow. Novoilyinsk is the nearest rural locality.
