= Kumakanda =

Kumakanda Кумаканда
- Selo
- Location within Zabaykalsky Krai Location within Russia
- Coordinates: 52°42′N 116°53′E
- Country: Russia
- Region: Zabaykalsky Krai
- District: Chernyshevsky District
- Time zone: UTC+9:00

Kumakanda (Russian: Кумаканда) is a rural locality (a selo) in Chernyshevsky District, Zabaykalsky Krai, Russia. Population: 61 (2021 census); 80 (2010 census); 89 (2002 census); There are 3 streets in this selo.

== Geography ==
This rural locality is located 22 km from Chernyshevsk (the district's administrative centre), 241 km from Chita (capital of Zabaykalsky Krai) and 5,352 km from Moscow. Milgidun is the nearest rural locality.
