= Shiviya-Nadelyayevo =

Shiviya-Nadelyayevo Шивия-Наделяево
- Selo
- Location within Zabaykalsky Krai Location within Russia
- Coordinates: 52°17′N 117°02′E
- Country: Russia
- Region: Zabaykalsky Krai
- District: Chernyshevsky District
- Time zone: UTC+9:00

Shiviya-Nadelyayevo (Russian: Шивия-Наделяево) is a rural locality (a selo) in Chernyshevsky District, Zabaykalsky Krai, Russia. Population: 79 (2021 census); 93 (2010 census); There are 4 streets in this selo.

== Geography ==
This rural locality is located 26 km from Chernyshevsk (the district's administrative centre), 243 km from Chita (capital of Zabaykalsky Krai) and 5,415 km from Moscow. Ukurey is the nearest rural locality.
