= Bagulny =

Bagulny Багульный
- Settlement
- Location within Zabaykalsky Krai Location within Russia
- Coordinates: 52°24′N 116°47′E
- Country: Russia
- Region: Zabaykalsky Krai
- District: Chernyshevsky District
- Time zone: UTC+9:00

Bagulny (Russian: Багульный) is a rural locality (a settlement) in Chernyshevsky District, Zabaykalsky Krai, Russia. Population: 418 (2021 census); 464 (2010 census); There are 4 streets in this settlement.

== Geography ==
This rural locality is located 20 km from Chernyshevsk (the district's administrative centre), 228 km from Chita (capital of Zabaykalsky Krai) and 5,384 km from Moscow. Komsomolskoye is the nearest rural locality.
