= Ulyakan =

Ulyakan Ульякан
- Settlement
- Location within Zabaykalsky Krai Location within Russia
- Coordinates: 53°09′N 117°55′E
- Country: Russia
- Region: Zabaykalsky Krai
- District: Chernyshevsky District
- Time zone: UTC+9:00

Ulyakan (Russian: Ульякан) is a rural locality (a settlement) in Chernyshevsky District, Zabaykalsky Krai, Russia. Population: 262 (2021 census); 293 (2010 census); There are 5 streets in this settlement.

== Geography ==
This rural locality is located 93 km from Chernyshevsk (the district's administrative centre), 320 km from Chita (capital of Zabaykalsky Krai) and 5,362 km from Moscow. Zudyra is the nearest rural locality.
