= Borodinsk =

Borodinsk Бородинск
- Selo
- Location within Zabaykalsky Krai Location within Russia
- Coordinates: 52°54′N 116°37′E
- Country: Russia
- Region: Zabaykalsky Krai
- District: Chernyshevsky District
- Time zone: UTC+9:00

Borodinsk (Russian: Бородинск) is a rural locality (a selo) in Chernyshevsky District, Zabaykalsky Krai, Russia. Population: 44 (2021 census); 69 (2010 census); There are 2 streets in this selo.

== Geography ==
This rural locality is located 50 km from Chernyshevsk (the district's administrative centre), 231 km from Chita (capital of Zabaykalsky Krai) and 5,308 km from Moscow. Ust-Gorbitsa is the nearest rural locality.
