= Kadaya, Chernyshevsky District, Zabaykalsky Krai =

Kadaya Кадая
- Selo
- Location within Zabaykalsky Krai Location within Russia
- Coordinates: 52°33′N 116°33′E
- Country: Russia
- Region: Zabaykalsky Krai
- District: Chernyshevsky District
- Time zone: UTC+9:00

Kadaya (Russian: Кадая) is a rural locality (a selo) in Chernyshevsky District, Zabaykalsky Krai, Russia. Population: 184 (2021 census); 219 (2010 census); There are 5 streets in this selo.

== Geography ==
This rural locality is located 31 km from Chernyshevsk (the district's administrative centre), 215 km from Chita (capital of Zabaykalsky Krai) and 5,350 km from Moscow. Novy Olov is the nearest rural locality.
