= Zudyra =

Zudyra Зудыра
- Settlement
- Location within Zabaykalsky Krai Location within Russia
- Coordinates: 53°06′N 117°47′E
- Country: Russia
- Region: Zabaykalsky Krai
- District: Chernyshevsky District
- Time zone: UTC+9:00

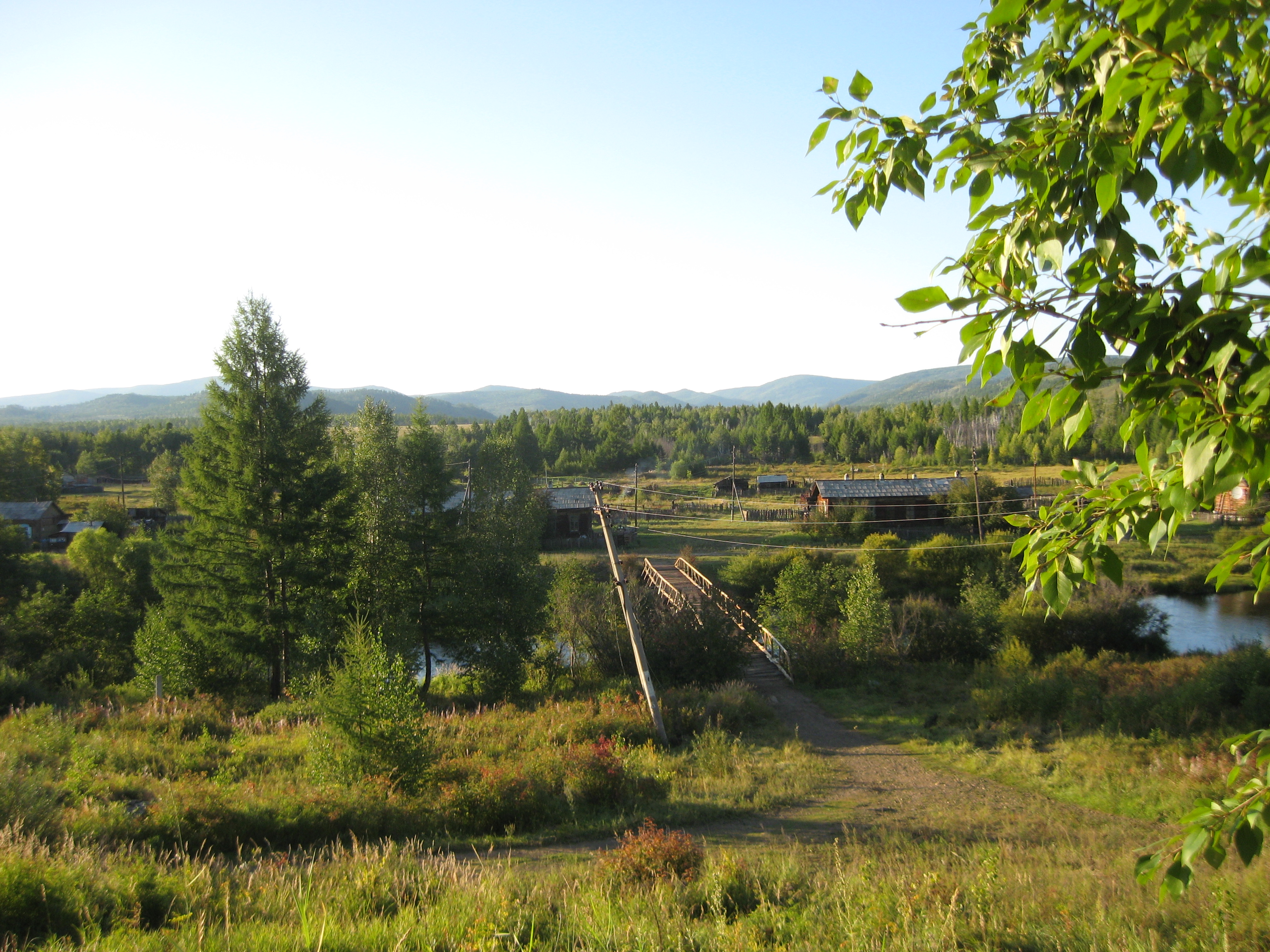
Zudyra station.

Zudyra (Russian: Зудыра) is a rural locality (a settlement) in Chernyshevsky District, Zabaykalsky Krai, Russia. Population: 32 (2021 census); 32 (2010 census); There is 1 street in this settlement.

== Geography ==
This rural locality is located 83 km from Chernyshevsk (the district's administrative centre), 311 km from Chita (capital of Zabaykalsky Krai) and 5,360 km from Moscow. Ulyakan is the nearest rural locality.
