= Gaur, Zabaykalsky Krai =

Gaur Гаур
- Selo
- Location within Zabaykalsky Krai Location within Russia
- Coordinates: 52°27′N 117°01′E
- Country: Russia
- Region: Zabaykalsky Krai
- District: Chernyshevsky District
- Time zone: UTC+9:00

Gaur (Russian: Гаур) is a rural locality (a selo) in Chernyshevsky District, Zabaykalsky Krai, Russia. Population: 428 (2021 census); 466 (2010 census); 841 (2002 census); There are 6 streets in this selo.

== Geography ==
This rural locality is located 9 km from Chernyshevsk (the district's administrative centre), 243 km from Chita (capital of Zabaykalsky Krai) and 5,395 km from Moscow. Chernyshevsk is the nearest rural locality.
