= Uryum, Zabaykalsky Krai =

Uryum Урюм
- Settlement
- Location within Zabaykalsky Krai Location within Russia
- Coordinates: 53°10′N 118°06′E
- Country: Russia
- Region: Zabaykalsky Krai
- District: Chernyshevsky District
- Time zone: UTC+9:00

Uryum (Russian: Урюм) is a rural locality (a settlement) in Chernyshevsky District, Zabaykalsky Krai, Russia. Population: 513 (2021 census); 557 (2010 census); There are 10 streets in this settlement.

== Geography ==
This rural locality is located 102 km from Chernyshevsk (the district's administrative centre), 332 km from Chita (capital of Zabaykalsky Krai) and 5,373 km from Moscow. Ulyakan is the nearest rural locality.
