= Chinese Eastern Railway =

Historical railroad system in northeast China

- Traditional Chinese: 中國東省鐵路
- Simplified Chinese: 中国东省铁路
Transcriptions
Standard Mandarin
- Hanyu Pinyin: Zhōngguó Dōngshěng tiělù
- Wade–Giles: Chung1-kup2 Tung1-sheng3 t'ieh3-lu4

The routing of the main line of the Chinese Eastern Railway (Manzhouli to Harbin to Suifenhe), here labelled the Trans-Manchurian Railway, and its southern branch (Harbin to Dalian). After 1905, most of the southern branch (from Changchun to Dalian) became the Japan-run South Manchuria Railway

The Chinese Eastern Railway or CER (Chinese: 中國東省鐵路, Russian: Китайско-Восточная железная дорога, or КВЖД, Kitaysko-Vostochnaya Zheleznaya Doroga or KVZhD), is the historical name for a railway system in Northeast China (also known as Manchuria).

The Russian Empire constructed the line from 1897 to 1902. The Railway was a concession to Russia, and later the Soviet Union, granted by the Qing dynasty government of Imperial China. The system linked Chita with Vladivostok in the Russian Far East and with Port Arthur, then an Imperial Russian leased ice-free port. The T-shaped line consisted of three branches:

- the western branch, now the Harbin–Manzhouli Railway
- the eastern branch, now the Harbin–Suifenhe Railway
- the southern branch, now part of the Beijing–Harbin Railway

which intersected in Harbin. Saint Petersburg administered the railway and the concession, known as the Chinese Eastern Railway Zone, from the city of Harbin, which grew into a major rail-hub.

The southern branch of the CER, known as the Japanese South Manchuria Railway from 1906, became a locus and partial casus belli for the Russo-Japanese War of 1904–1905, the 1929 Sino-Soviet Conflict, and the Second Sino-Japanese War of 1937–1945. The Soviet Union sold the railway to the Japanese puppet state of Manchukuo in 1935; later in 1945 the Soviets regained co-ownership of the railway by treaty. The Soviet Union returned the Chinese Eastern Railway to the People's Republic of China in 1952.

== Name ==
The official Chinese name of this railway was Great Qing Eastern Provinces Railway (Chinese: 大清東省鐵路; pinyin: Dàqīng Dōngshěng Tiělù), also known as Eastern Qing Railway (東清鐵路; Dōngqīng Tiělù) or Eastern Provinces Railway (東省鐵路; Dōngshěng Tiělù). After the Xinhai Revolution, the northern branches was renamed to Chinese Eastern Provinces Railway (中國東省鐵路; Zhōngguó Dōngshěng tiělù) in 1915, shortened form as (中東鐵路; Zhōngdōng Tiělù).

The southern branch was renamed to South Manchuria Railway (Japanese kyujitai/Chinese: 南滿洲鐵道) after Japanese took over from Russians in 1905.

It is also known in English as the Chinese Far East Railway, Trans-Manchurian Railway and North Manchuria Railway.

== History ==
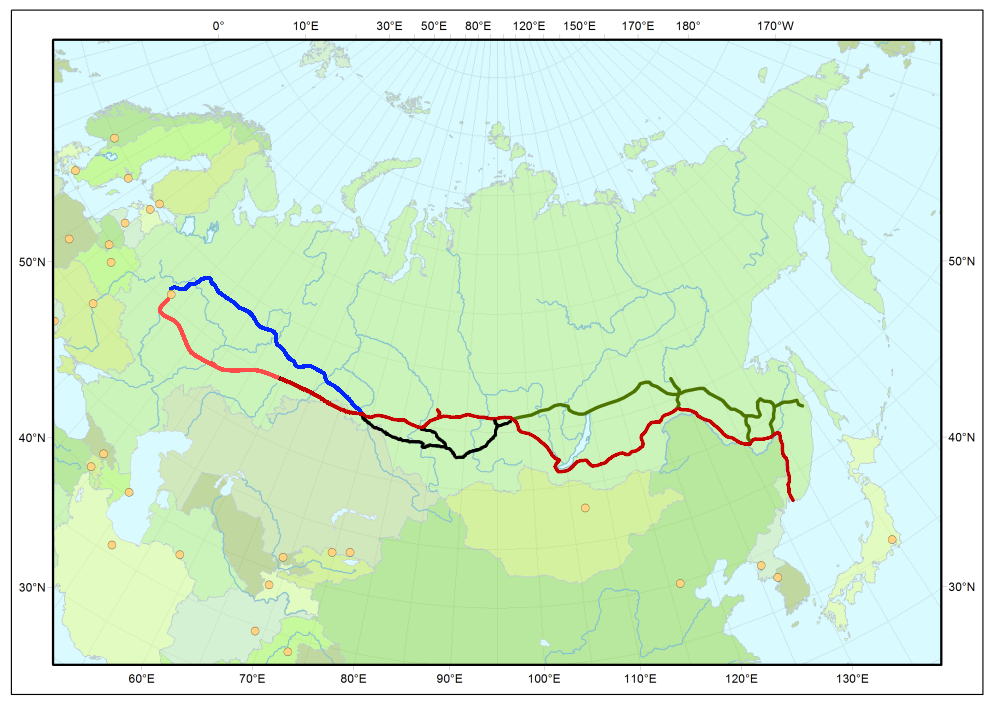
The Trans-Siberian Railway line around Manchuria in red; the Chinese Far East Railway, which runs across Manchuria, not shown. (The Soviet Baikal Amur Mainline in green.)

=== Planning ===
The Chinese Eastern Railway, a single-track line, provided a shortcut for the world's longest railroad, the Trans-Siberian Railway, from near the Siberian city of Chita, across northern Manchuria via Harbin to the Russian port of Vladivostok. This route drastically reduced the travel distance required along the originally proposed main northern route to Vladivostok, which lay completely on Russian soil but was not completed until a decade after the Manchurian "shortcut".

As the Western powers became increasingly active in East Asia and the Far East in the late 19th century, the Russian Empire became concerned about the situation of much of its Siberian and Far Eastern territories, which were effectively cut off from the central part of the country. There was a necessity to implement a set of urgent measures to develop the peripheries, which required to connect them with the heartland via reliable and efficient transport communications. In 1891 the decision to build the Trans-Siberian railway was made. Its construction started simultaneously from Vladivostok and Chelyabinsk, being financed by the state, and demonstrating unprecedented rates of railway construction: in 10 years 7,500 kilometres of the new railway were laid. From the eastern side, the Trans-Siberian was extended from Vladivostok to Khabarovsk, where construction works were slowed down by the necessity to build a huge bridge over the Amur River. On the western side, the railway tracks were extended to the Transbaikal region.

When work on laying the Trans-Siberian started, two variants of its passage from Transbaikal to the east were considered. According to the first option, the main line was to go along the Amur coast and the Russian-Chinese border to Khabarovsk, and according to the second option — through Manchuria to the Pacific Ocean. The second option had already been considered during the designing process, when the possibility of laying it from Irkutsk through Kyakhta to Mongolia, then through China to the Russian Primorye was discussed. Engineer Nikolai Sergeyevich Sviyagin played a prominent role in laying the route and supervising the construction of particularly challenging sections.

The proponents of the Trans-Siberian along the Amur River justified it by the subsequent growth of opportunities for economic and social development of the Russian territories of Eastern Siberia and the Far East. Sergei Mikhailovich Dukhovskoi, who was the Governor-General of Priamur in the period of 1893–1898, stated that even in case of Manchuria's annexation into the Russian Empire, the importance of the Amur railway for Russia would remain enormous, as well as its "colonisation and base-building significance". He emphasised that in no case should the construction of the railway line along the Amur River, which had been planned earlier, be discontinued.

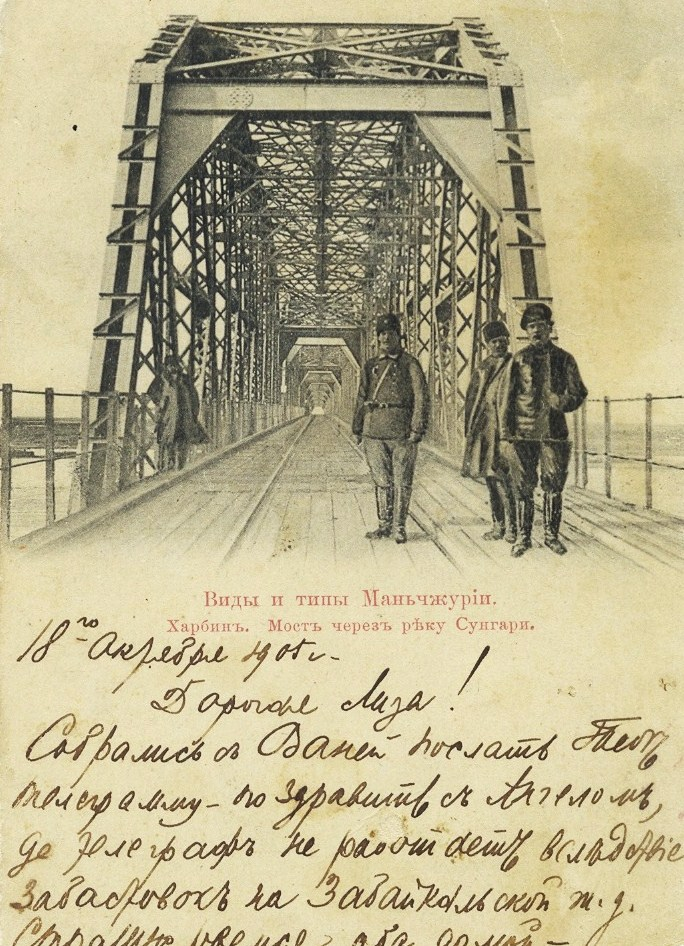
Bridge over the Songhua River (Russian postcard from the early twentieth century)

The Manchurian option was supported by Finance Minister Sergei Witte, who believed that the railway would facilitate the peaceful conquest of Manchuria. Increased Japanese activity in the Far East, which threatened the interests of the Russian Empire in China, also played in favour of the Manchurian option. In addition, the Manchurian option gave Russia an opportunity to enter new markets in the Asia-Pacific region. In the end, the proposal of the minister of finance to build a railway line —named the "Chinese Eastern Railway"— through the territory of Manchuria won out. Only the defeat in the Russo-Japanese War of 1904–05 demonstrated the erroneous nature of this decision to the government, which accelerated the construction of the Amur railway.

During planning of the construction of the CER, the decision to attract private capital was taken, and the appropriate preparatory work was carried out. In December 1895, the Russian-Chinese Bank was established with an initial capital of 6 million roubles. Its creation was split between several entities: 15% of the funds were provided by the St. Petersburg International Commercial Bank, and 61% came from 4 French banks.

On 22 May 1896 the secret Russian-Chinese treaty on the alliance of Russia and China against Japan (the so-called Li–Lobanov Treaty) was formalised. The treaty was signed by Sergei Witte and Prince Aleksey Lobanov-Rostovsky on the Russian side and Li Hongzhang on the Chinese (Qing) side. The treaty gave Russia the right to build a railway line through Manchuria. On 27 August 1896, the Chinese envoy to the Russian Empire, Xu Jingcheng, signed an 80-year-long agreement with the board of the Russian-Chinese Bank to grant the bank the right to build and operate a railway through Manchuria and to establish a joint-stock named the "Chinese Eastern Railway Company". The charter of this joint-stock company was approved by Tsar Nicholas II on 4 December 1896. According to it, the Russian-Chinese Bank was responsible for the formation of the joint-stock company (§ 1), and the company's share capital was set at 5 million credit roubles (§ 10). The society was granted the right of unconditional and exclusive management of its lands. Passengers and goods transported in transit from one Russian border station to another were exempted from visas and customs duties.

In December 1896, elections of the board of the CER Society were held in St. Petersburg. According to the results of the elections S.I. Kerbedz became vice-chairman of the board, while the elected members of the board were: Peter Mikhailovich Romanov, A.Y. Rothstein, Dmitry Dmitrievich Pokotilov, E.K. Zickler, von Schaffhausen, and Esper Ukhtomsky. In January 1897 the Emperor of China issued a decree appointing the former envoy of China in St. Petersburg and Berlin, Xu Jingcheng, as the first chairman of the CER Society.

Selection of specialists for laying the CER was supervised personally by Sergei Witte, on whose recommendation Alexander Iosifovich Jugovich, a builder of the Ryazan-Ural railway, was appointed chief engineer. The CER Construction Department —which at first was called the Sungari railway settlement— was founded on the bank of the Songhua River, on the site of its supposed crossing by the railway line, where Harbin would consequently be constructed.

On 24 April 1897 a vanguard detachment of the CER Construction Department, headed by engineer A.I. Shidlovsky, arrived on the banks of the Songhua River, guarded by a troop (fifty men) of Kuban Cossacks under Colonel Pavievsky. In order to protect the construction of the CER a special Security Guard was created, later transformed into the Zaamursky District of the Separate Corps of Border Guards.

=== Topographic and geodetic surveys ===
Russia's political and economic expansion into Manchuria in 1894–1905 was marked by, on one hand, the initial delimitation of the Russian-Chinese state border and, on the other hand, the Chinese government's adoption of a plan to build a strategic railway from Dagu to Shanhaiguan — Jingzhou — Mukden, and then through Ninguta to Hongcun on the Tumen River, the survey of which was entrusted to the British engineer Kinder and started in 1890. In the period of 1894–1895 engineering surveys were carried out according to the approved plan of 13 March 1893 along the line of the Amur railroad from Sretensk to Khabarovsk running almost parallel to the Amur River, which showed the difficulty of this direction and prompted the idea of bypassing the encountered obstacles through Manchuria. In addition, the matter had been scrutinized by the general staff.

On the occasion of the coronation of Nicholas II in 1896 and the arrival of an extraordinary Chinese envoy, there was an official discussion at the highest level about the railroad from Novo-Tsuruhaitui through Mergen to Blagoveshchensk as a "correction of our Amur border", which was a great geopolitical and military-strategic achievement of Russia. A secret alliance treaty of Russia and China regarding the construction of the CER was concluded. As soon as the legal basis for the construction of the CER was established, the Corps of Military Topographers sent several detachments of engineers to Manchuria under the guise of scientific research.

In early 1896, Lieutenant General I. I. Stebnitsky ordered the laying of the Chinese Eastern Railway, and work began in the summer of the same year. It was proposed to lay the railway through Manchuria: "one astronomer, two heads of departments and twelve surveyors for geodetic and topographic work in the area south of Nerchinsk; one astronomer, three heads of departments and eighteen topographers to survey the area along the watershed of the Greater Khingan. The task of the topographers is to assist the surveying engineers to finally establish the direction of the railway from Ust'-Ononskaya to Qiqihar and from Girin to Nikolskoe".

In 1896, 3 survey parties of the Corps of Military Topographers worked in Manchuria. Each consisted of a supervisor and 6 surveyors. The 1st party worked in the west of Manchuria, it consisted of: Chief Lieutenant Colonel Rafailov, staff captains Kulesh, Antonov, Mamamy, Suppura, Poruchik Panfilov, and Collegiate Assessor Velinsky. The 2nd party was headed by Lieutenant Colonel Kozlovsky, composed of Captain Dukhnovsky, Staff Captain Brazhkin, Collegiate Assessor Sibirtsev, titular counsellors Zemensky and Brovkin, as well as assessors Gursky and Krukovsky. Lieutenant Colonel Boltenko was appointed to the 3rd survey party, whose members were: Staff Captain von Siegel, Lieutenant Yavshits, while collegiate assessors Kuchevsky, Nikiforov, Aganchikov and Chuklin were appointed topographic surveyors.

Based on the surveys, by March 1898 it was possible to start the construction project. Similar work on the Canadian Pacific Railway under similar topographical conditions took 10 years (from 1869 to 1879) to complete. Topographers surveyed about 15,000 square versts —6,591.12 square miles (17,070.9 km^{2})— at a two-verst —7,000 feet (2.1 km)— scale.

=== Beginning of construction ===
Map of the South Manchuria Railway from Port Arthur (Lüshun) to Changchun.

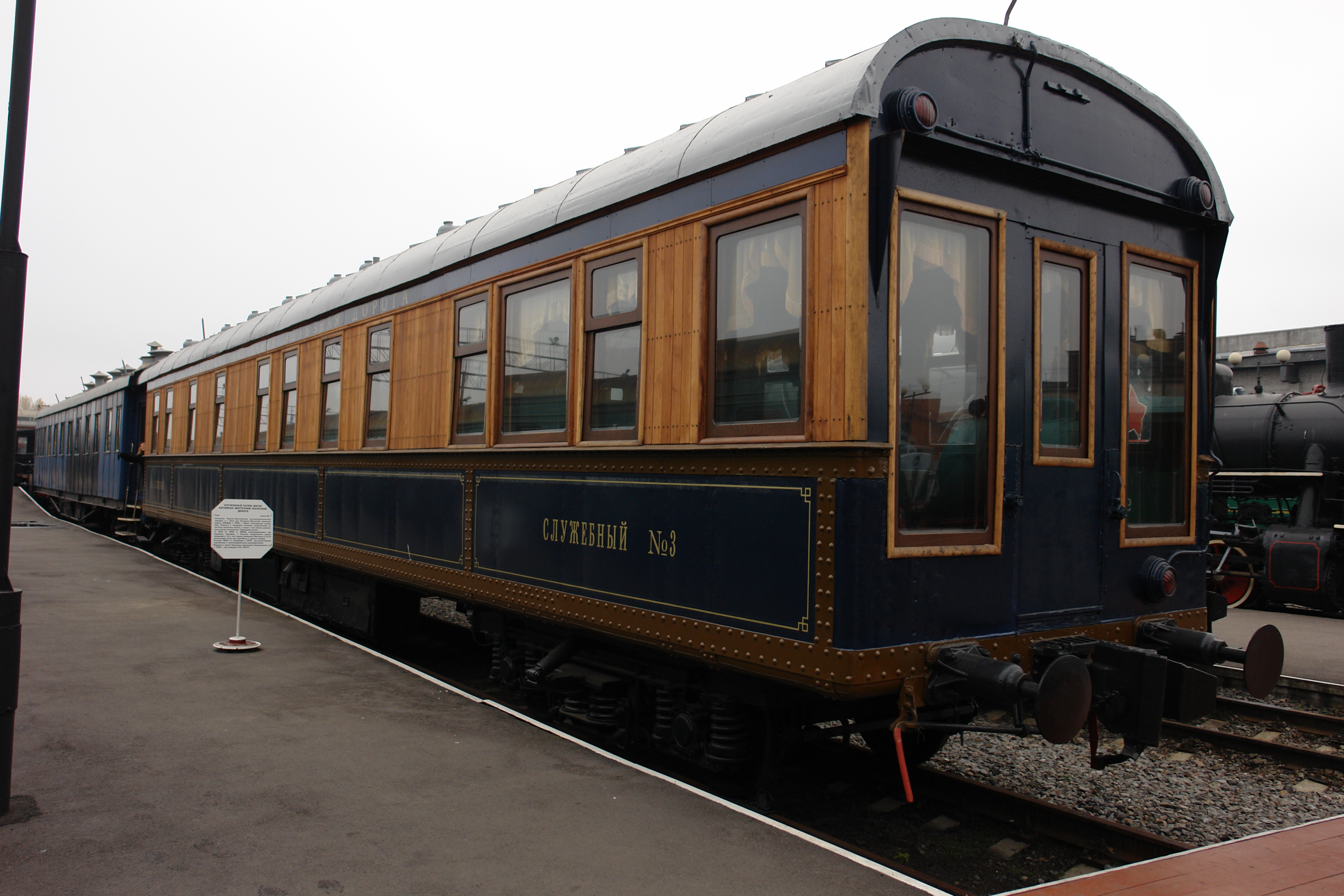
Service saloon car of the CER. 1902 model.

Work on the CER began on 16 August 1897. Construction was carried out simultaneously from the location of the Construction Department (a settlement near the Songhua River, future Harbin) in three directions and from three final points of the CER: Grodekovo station in Primorye, from Transbaikal and from Port Arthur (Lüshun Port). In June 1898, Russia obtained a concession to build the southern, 550-mile (890 km) spur line, of the CER (what would later become the South Manchuria Railway), which was supposed to secure a connection with Dalian and the ice-free deep-water port of Port Arthur, which Russia was fortifying and developing into a first-class strategic naval base and marine coaling station for its Far East Fleet and Merchant Marine. It was located on the Liaodong Peninsula, leased to the Russian Empire in March 1898 thanks to the Convention for the Lease of the Liaotung Peninsula signed with China. On 16 May 1898, in the Songhua Railway Settlement (also called Bridge Settlement), engineer Adam Shidlovsky laid the first barracks, from which the city of Harbin would evolve.

Due to the long length of the railway, it was initially decided to disaggregate the construction into separate sections with their own managers. The line between stations "Manchuria" in Transbaikal and "Pogranichnaya" in Primorye was divided into 13 construction sections, the line from Harbin to Port Arthur was divided into 8 sections.

In 1899, the Boxer Rebellion broke out in the Qing Empire. The rebellion lasted up to 1901, which caused interruptions in construction of some sections of the CER. On 23 June 1900, the Chinese Boxers attacked the builders and proceeded to destroy sections of the railway track and station buildings. The fate of the party of builders retreating from Mukden, under the command of Lieutenant Valevsky and engineer Verkhovsky, was grim. Almost all of them lost their lives in uneven fighting. Verkhovsky, who was captured, was beheaded in Liaoyang. To protect the road and personnel, in 1900, on the initiative of Sergei Witte, a Security Guard of 11,000 men was created.

Nevertheless, on 5 July 1901 the preliminary movement of trains and transportation of cargoes along the whole length of the CER began. Due to the fact that it was no longer necessary to divide the road into construction sections, they were merged into groups, subordinating the whole project back directly to the chief engineer, abolishing the positions of heads of departments.

As part of the Eight-Nation Alliance (Great Britain, France, Germany, the United States, Russia, Japan, Italy, Austria-Hungary), created to suppress the Boxer Rebellion, the Russian Empire seized the opportunity and occupied the northeastern provinces of the Qing Empire to gain additional advantages in the region, launching a separate invasion of Manchuria to protect their interests in the railroad. However, negotiations with the Chinese government after the suppression of the rebellion failed due to the considerable opposition of other powers. Thusly, the government of the Russian Empire in August 1903 created the Far Eastern Viceroyalty headed by Admiral Yevgeni Ivanovich Alekseyev and entrusted him with further negotiations directly with the Qing court.

=== Opening of the railway ===
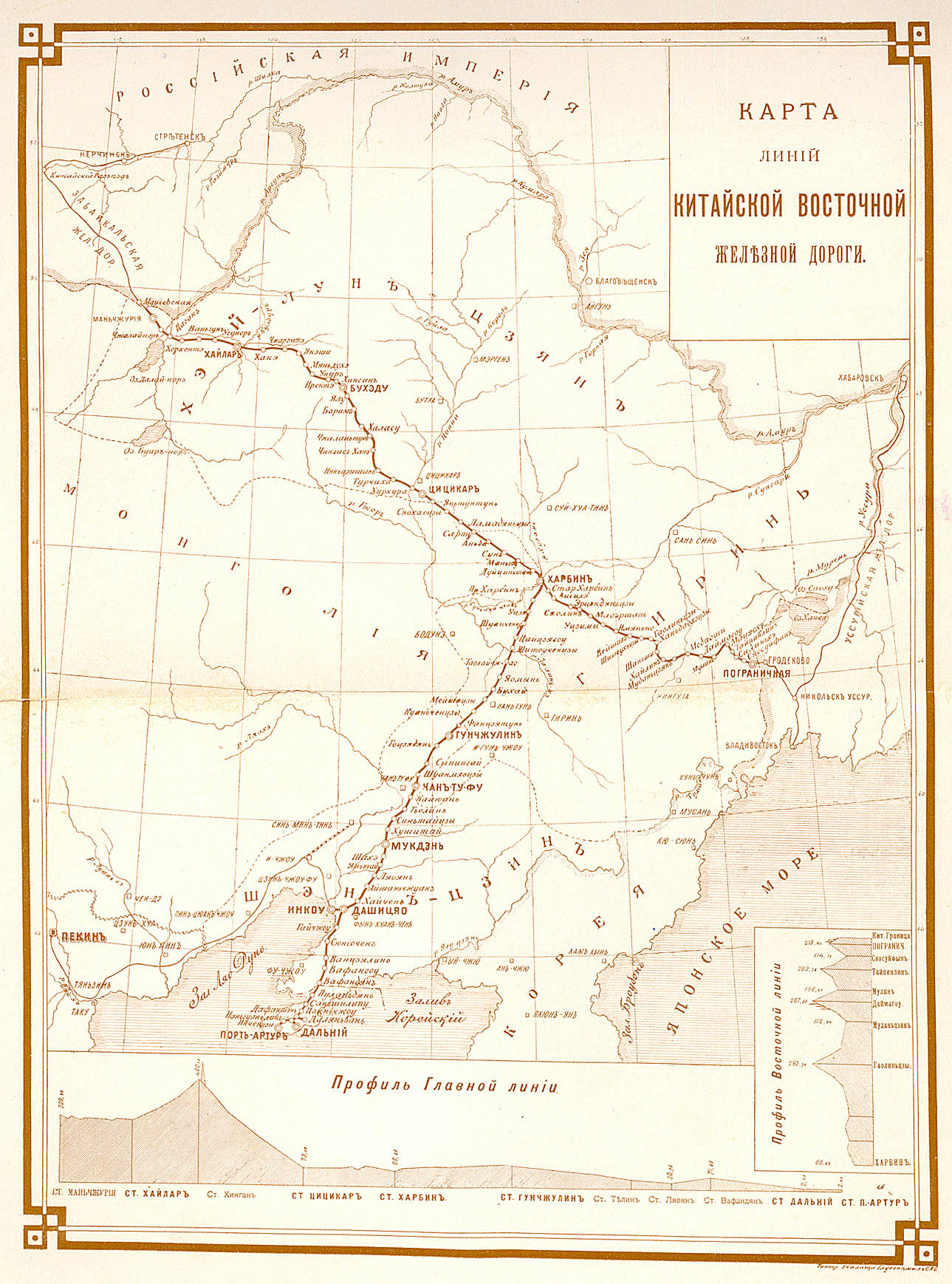
A map of the CER, 1903.

On 1 June 1903 the CER was officially opened, as the Construction Department transferred administrative obligations to the Exploitation Department. The cost of construction, it was reviewed, was 152,000 rubles per verst—3,500 feet (1.1 km).

The express train from Moscow to Port Arthur had a journey time of 13 days and 4 hours, while the standard passenger train had a journey time of 16 days and 14 hours. A 1st class ticket in the express train cost 272 roubles, 3rd class in the passenger train — 64 roubles. Arrival of standard trains to Dalian was coordinated with departure of steam expresses belonging to the CER to Shanghai and Nagasaki from the port on the same day.

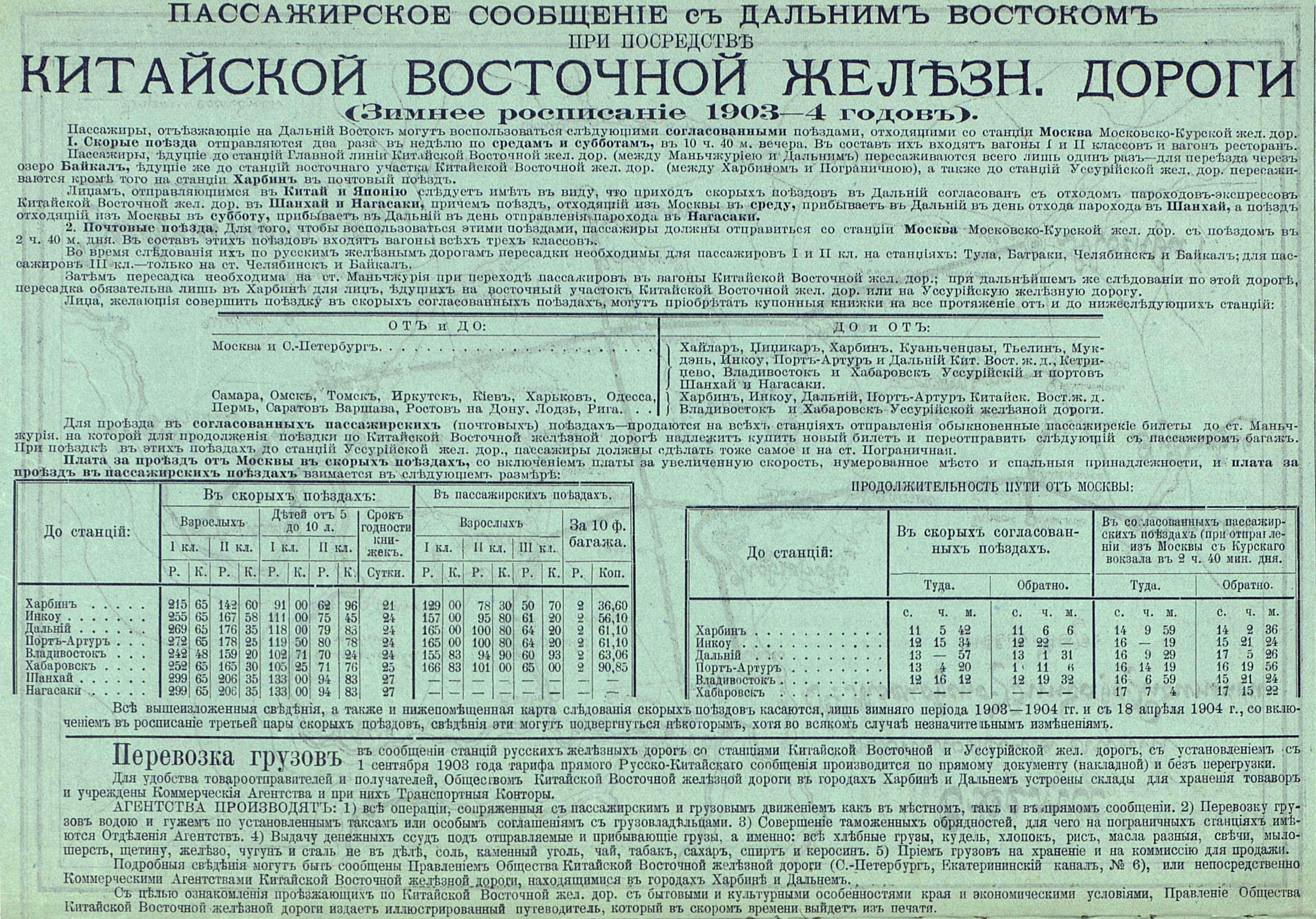
CER advertisement (timetables and prices), 1904.

The completion of the CER immediately increased the advantages of Manchuria's position, turning this backward territory into an economically developed part of the Qing Empire. By 1908, in under 7 years, Manchuria's population had grown from 8.1 million to 15.8 million due to an influx from China proper. The development of Manchuria was so rapid that in a few years Harbin, Dalian and Port Arthur overtook the Far Eastern Russian cities of Blagoveshchensk, Khabarovsk and Vladivostok in population. The excess population in Manchuria led to tens of thousands of Chinese annually moving to Primorye for work in the summer, where there was still a shortage of Russian population, which continued to hamper the development of the region.

Russia's defeat in the war with Japan also affected further prospects of the CER. Under the Portsmouth Treaty most of the southern branch of the CER (the section south from Changchun), occupied by Japan, was formally transferred and annexed, forming the South Manchuria Railway. This put an end to the Russian Empire government's plans to use the CER to access the Asia-Pacific markets, but at the same time favourably influenced the resumption of construction of the Amur Railway.

In 1908, Tobolsk governor Nikolay Gondatti, addressing the government, insisted on building the Amur Railway and laying the second gauge on the Trans-Siberian and Transbaikal railways, without which the Amur Railway would have only local significance. In 1911 Nikolay Gondatti was appointed governor-general of the Priamurye Krai, after which he managed to realise plans to connect the Ussuriysk Railway with the Amur Railway through the construction of a bridge across the Amur River.

In 1910, the Russian-Chinese Bank (which had rights to the CER) and the Northern Bank were merged to form the Russian-Asian Bank with an initial capital of 35 million roubles.

=== After the October Revolution ===
On 29 November 1917 the Harbin Council of Workers' and Soldiers' Deputies dissolved all other organisations and declared itself the only authority on the CER, and on 4 December dismissed Dmitry Horvat as railway manager and appointed B. A. Slavin as commissar of the railway.

On 13 December 1917, at the request of Dmitry Horvath, Chinese troops under the command of Zhang Zuolin entered Harbin and dissolved the Harbin Soviet of Workers' and Soldiers' Deputies.

On 16 March 1920 Chinese troops under the command of Major Luo Bin occupied the Headquarters of the Russian commander-in-chief in Harbin and by 19 March completely occupied the CER buffer security zone on either side of the railway. This meant that de facto the CER's security forces ceased to exist. On 23 September 1920 the Republic of China, by presidential decree "On the termination of recognition of powers of Russian envoys and consuls in China" annulled the right of extraterritoriality for the subjects of the Russian Empire, and in 1921 the CER buffer zone was transformed into the Special Region of Eastern Provinces — a separate administrative unit of the Republic of China.

Engineer Boris Vasilyevich Ostroumov occupied the position of manager of the CER from April 1921 and October 1924. During this period, the staff of the railway was comparatively lower to that of tsarists administrations: 15,750 people, out of whom 9,000 regular employees, as of 1 January 1924.

On 31 May 1924, the USSR and the Republic of China signed the "Agreement on General Principles for the Settlement of Matters between the Union of Soviet Socialist Republics and the Republic of China", under which diplomatic relations were restored between the two countries, the Soviet government renouncing any "special rights and privileges", after which the Russian concessions in Harbin, Tianjin and Hankou were abolished, with the Chinese government vowing not to transfer these rights and privileges to a third power. The CER remained under Soviet administration and maintenance, being declared a purely commercial enterprise. All matters relating to civil and military administration remained under the jurisdiction of the Chinese authorities. The administration of the railway was made up of 5 Soviet and 5 Chinese citizens; the chairman was Chinese, his colleague and the railway manager were Soviet citizens. The USSR agreed to an anticipated purchase of the CER by China (according to the 1896 agreement, it wasn't possible after until 36 years following its opening). In October of the same year a large-scale purge of the CER apparatus was carried out: Manager B. V. Ostroumov, D. L. Horvat, Chief Accountant M. I. Stepunin and a number of other officials were dismissed and evicted from official housing. Those who were dismissed were generally not paid an "out-of-state allowance". In response, B. V. Ostroumov and others filed lawsuits in Chinese courts, which forced the Soviet administration to pay this allowance.

The purge was not exhaustive. Many employees of the CER with an anti-Soviet past were temporarily left in their places, for example, Chief Controller Georgiy Konstantinovich Gins, who served earlier in Kolchak's government, and former chief of staff of ataman Ivan Kalmykov, M.A. Demishkhan. In addition, in October 1924, the church department of the CER was abolished, and church clergy were evicted from their official housing as the tsarist cadres were gradually replaced by Soviet cadres. According to the Soviet-Chinese agreement of 1924 only Soviet or Chinese citizens could work on the CER, thus, since October 1924 employees of the railway and their relatives began to apply for Soviet citizenship to Soviet diplomatic institutions. According to the Soviet consul in Harbin, V. Y. Aboltin, by 1927 the "Soviet colony" in Manchuria numbered 25,000 people, by 1931 it was already 150,000 people.

During the first three years of Soviet management of the railway, the number of railway employees increased considerably. As of 1 October 1927, 27,144 people worked on the CER, including: 11,304 citizens of the USSR, 1,407 stateless individuals, 1,547 Russians with Chinese nationality, and 12,886 Chinese. In 1925 the Soviets initiated a trial against three top officials of the CER: B. V. Ostroumov, M. I. Stepunin, Head of land department N. M. Gondatti and Head of economic bureau I. A. Mikhailov. The case was presided over by a Chinese judge, who granted amnesty to all four defendants and released them on 12 September of the same year.

In early 1926, a conflict between two Chinese military commanders, Guo Sunlin and Zhang Zuolin, erupted and engulfed the CER. By the evening of 21 January that year, the Chinese military had taken control of the entire southern branch of the CER and had dissolved all trade unions by 23 January. Prompting the USSR to reach an agreement with China the next day: the manager of the railway arrested by the Chinese was to be released, normal communication on the railway was to be restored, and Chinese military transportations were to be carried out at half price and at the expense of the Chinese share of profit from the CER.

=== Attempts to seize the railway ===
In August 1926, the government of Zhang Zuolin, hostile to the USSR, came to power in China. Thereafter, the Chinese side began to gradually seize CER property. Already on 24 August 1926 the governing body of the railway received a dispatch in which Zhang Zuolin offered to hand over to the North-Eastern Naval Flotilla all the vessels of the CER, while on 4 September of the same year the Chinese seized the Training Department of the CER. After Zhang Zuolin was assassinated in June 1928, he was succeeded by his son, Zhang Xueliang. Under his leadership, a more firm and concrete approach was taking regarding the CER.

On 10 July 1929, Zhang Xueliang's troops seized the Chinese Eastern Railway, arrested over 200 Soviet railway employees, and deported 35 of them to the USSR. On 17 July 1929, the Soviet government announced the severance of diplomatic relations with China. The Soviet trade union of the Chinese Eastern Railway called on railway employees to resign voluntarily in protest. As a result, 1,689 people resigned between 10 July and 31 December 1929. In November 1929, the Special Red Banner Far Eastern Army conducted an operation to regain control of the CER. On 22 December 1929, in Khabarovsk, the representative of the Republic of China, Cai Yuanshen, and the Soviet Ministry of Foreign Affairs representative, Simanovsky, signed the "Khabarovsk Protocol," according to which the status quo regarding the Chinese Eastern Railway was restored in accordance with the Beijing and Mukden treaties.

In September 1931, Japan began its invasion of Manchuria under the pretext of fighting lawlessness among local governors. On 18 September, Japanese troops invaded Northern Manchuria. On 5 February 1932, Harbin was occupied and then was incorporated into the state of Manchukuo, which was proclaimed on 1 March 1932 by governors gathered by the Japanese in Mukden. This was followed by the severance of relations between Manchukuo and the Republic of China.

In the early 1930s, the CER found itself in a difficult situation. The railway's revenues declined sharply, partly due to the global economic crisis and partly due to the development of the Manchurian railway network. According to a confidential report by Y. V. Rudoy, Director of the Chinese Eastern Railway, the railway's revenues amounted to 68.1 million rubles in 1929, 49.2 million rubles in 1930, and 40.6 million rubles in 1931. Under these circumstances, the CER began to reduce its workforce. While on 1 January 1930, the CER employed 25,473 people, by 1 January 1931, this number had fallen to 19,107, and by 1 February 1932, to 16,089.

In addition, relations between the Soviet and Manchurian sides deteriorated in the early 1930s, with the latter being supported by the Japanese. The main issue was the so-called "case of the stolen locomotives". During World War I, the tsarist government ordered a large batch of locomotives from the United States for the Russian railways. They arrived and underwent maintenance at the Chinese Eastern Railway. During the Civil War, 124 of these locomotives were stuck at the Chinese Eastern Railway. The Chinese side considered them to be the property of the CER, while the Soviet side argued that they had no connection with it. The Soviet side transferred 83 locomotives to the USSR, and in response, the Chinese side discontinued direct communication between the Chinese Eastern Railway and the Soviet Transbaikal and Ussuri railways in 1933. On charges of stealing locomotives, the Manchurian authorities arrested six Soviet employees of the CER, who were held in custody for more than six months and released under an amnesty on 24 February 1934. But the locomotives apparently remained in the USSR. In addition, local authorities often arrested Soviet and Manchurian employees of the CER without charge. On 1 December 1934, 424 Soviet citizens had been arrested by the Manchurian authorities, of whom 201 were released, 94 were deported to the USSR, and 129 remained in custody. From 1 November 1934, Harbin radio programmes of White émigrés (e.g. Konstantin Rodzaevsky) were broadcast from Xinjiang to the Soviet Far East from a new powerful station.

On 19 September 1934, months of negotiations on the sale of the Chinese Eastern Railway by the Soviet side to the Manchukuo government, led by Mikhail Mikhailovich Slavutsky, Consul General of the USSR in Harbin, came to an end. The agreed transaction amount was 140 million yen. On 23 March 1935, the USSR and Manchukuo signed an agreement on the sale of the CER. It was agreed that Manchukuo would pay one-third of the amount in cash, with the remaining two-thirds to be paid off over three years through deliveries by Japanese and Manchurian companies to the USSR in Japan. After signing the deal, Manchukuo immediately paid 23.3 million yen.

Under Manchukuo control, the road was converted to European gauge (1,435 mm; 4 ft 8 1/2 in), which was widely used on other railways in China.

=== Resumed joint Sino-Soviet ownership (1945–1952) ===
On 20 August 1945, troops of the 2nd Far Eastern Front and ships of the Amur Flotilla, supported by airborne troops, captured Harbin, returning the Chinese Eastern Railway to Soviet control.

According to the 14 August 1945 Sino-Soviet agreement, the CER and South Manchuria Railway were unified into the newly created Chinese Changchun Railway (CCR) under joint Sino-Soviet administration for a 30-year period, after which the railway had to be transferred to China free of charge. The management of the railway was designated to a board composed, evenly, of 5 Soviet and 5 Chinese members, with headquarters in Changchun. Military personnel and the local civilian population aided in setting the track gauge along the main stretch of the CCR (Manchuria station — Harbin — Pogranichnaya station) to fit the Soviet standard.

Stalin considered the treaty made with Chiang Kai-shek to be unequal, and in the late 1940s proposed to Mao Zedong that Port Arthur (Lüshun Port) as well as the Dalian and the Chinese Eastern Railway be handed back to China, but Mao feared that a Soviet withdrawal from Manchuria would jeopardise the CCP's position in northeast China, and persuaded Stalin to postpone the transfer.

On 4 February 1950, in Moscow, the signing of the Sino-Soviet Treaty of Friendship, Alliance and Mutual Assistance; an agreement on the CCR, Dalian and Port Arthur; and a deal to provide the PRC with a long-term loan happened. On 25 April 1950, the railway came under the jurisdiction of the Chinese-Soviet Society of the CCR with headquarters in Harbin.

On 31 December 1952 the handover of the CCR to China was formalised. The CCR's assets, transferred to China, were valued at 600 million dollars, and included, apart from the railtracks, trains and wagons: locomotive repair plants, coal mines, a number of forestry, trade and catering enterprises, 1,850,364 m^{2} (19,917,150 sq ft) of housing space, 69 schools, 25 cultural centres and other facilities. From 1953, the Chinese Changchun Railway was reorganised into the Harbin Railway, symbolizing the end of all Russian involvement with the railway. In 1955, the Chinese government ceased to pay out pensions to CER pensioners (at that time 287 were living in Manchuria), however, after formal complaints, 60 of the pensioners received 1040 yuan each.

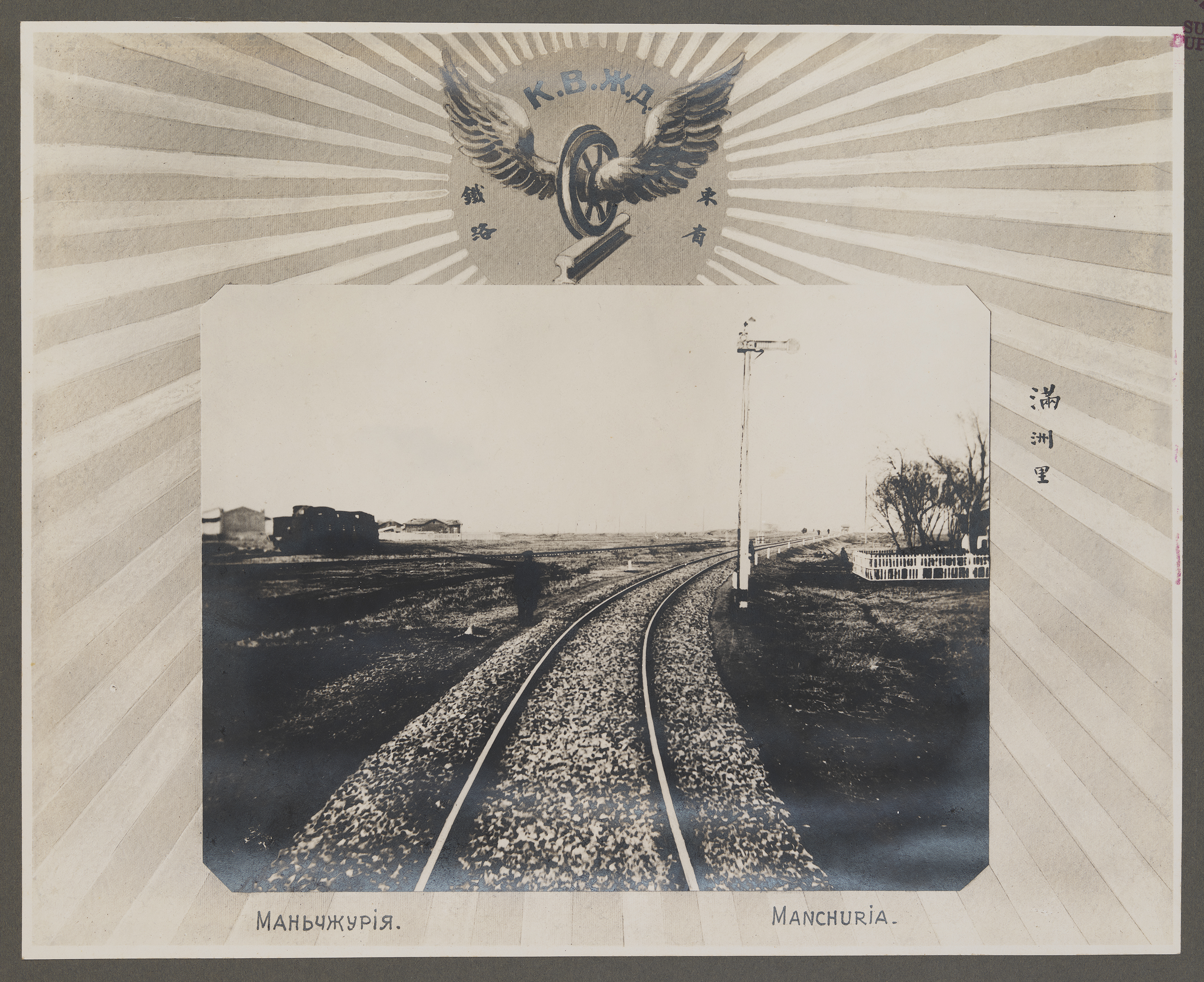
Railway in Manzhouli

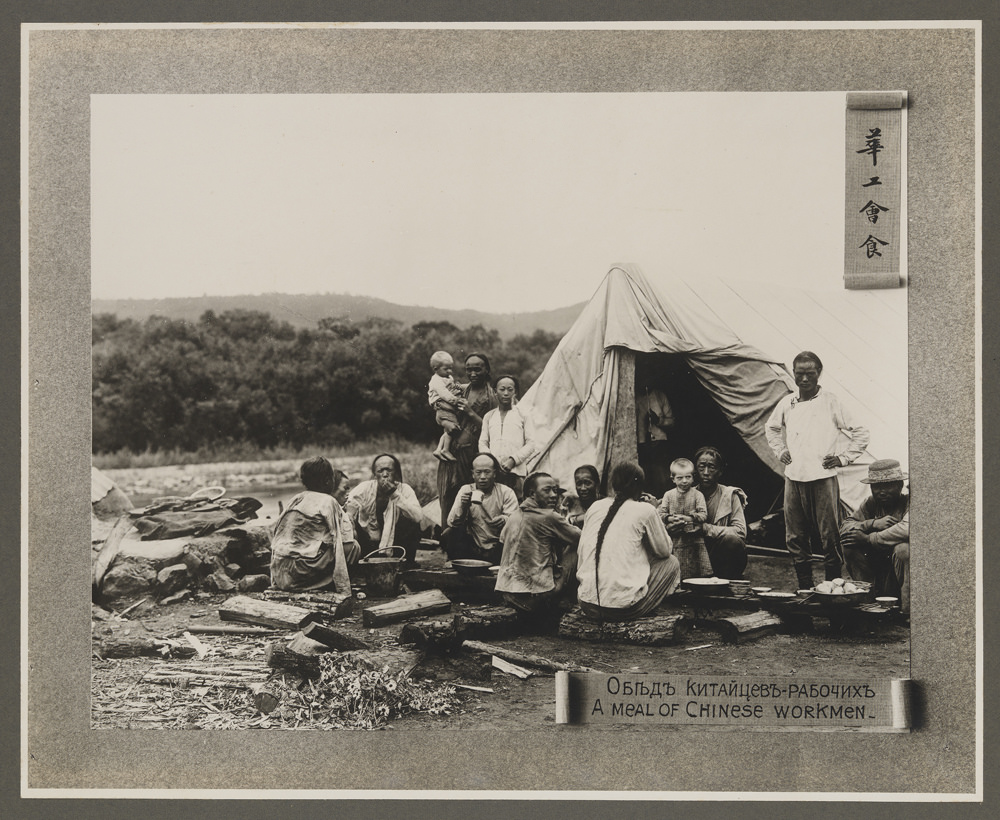
Chinese Eastern Railway Workmen at Meal, ca. 1903–1919

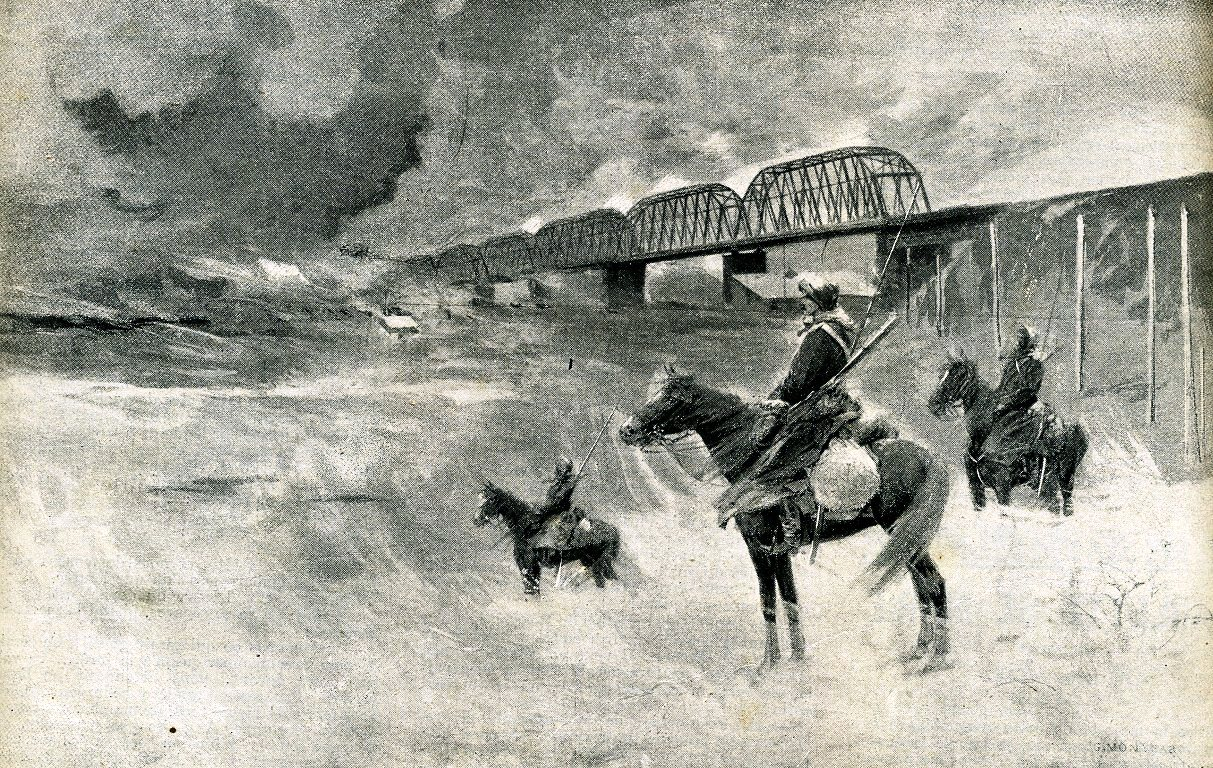
Cossacks guard the CER bridge over the Sungari River in Harbin during the Russo-Japanese War (1905)

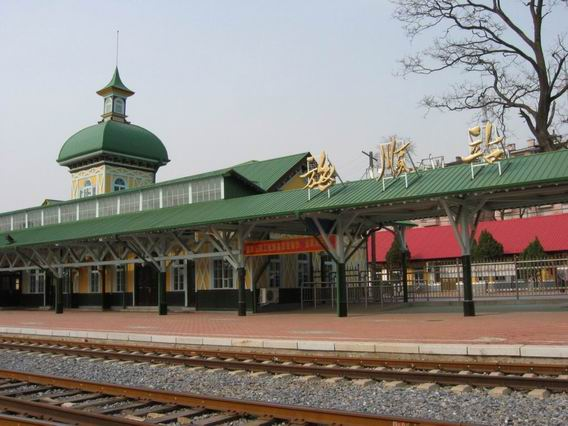
The Lüshun train station, built during the period of Russian control

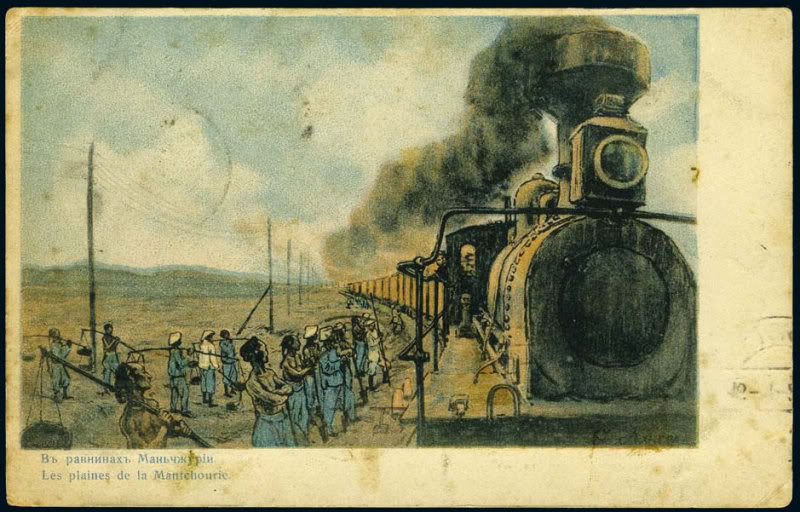
A 1900 postcard depicting a train on the Chinese Eastern Railway

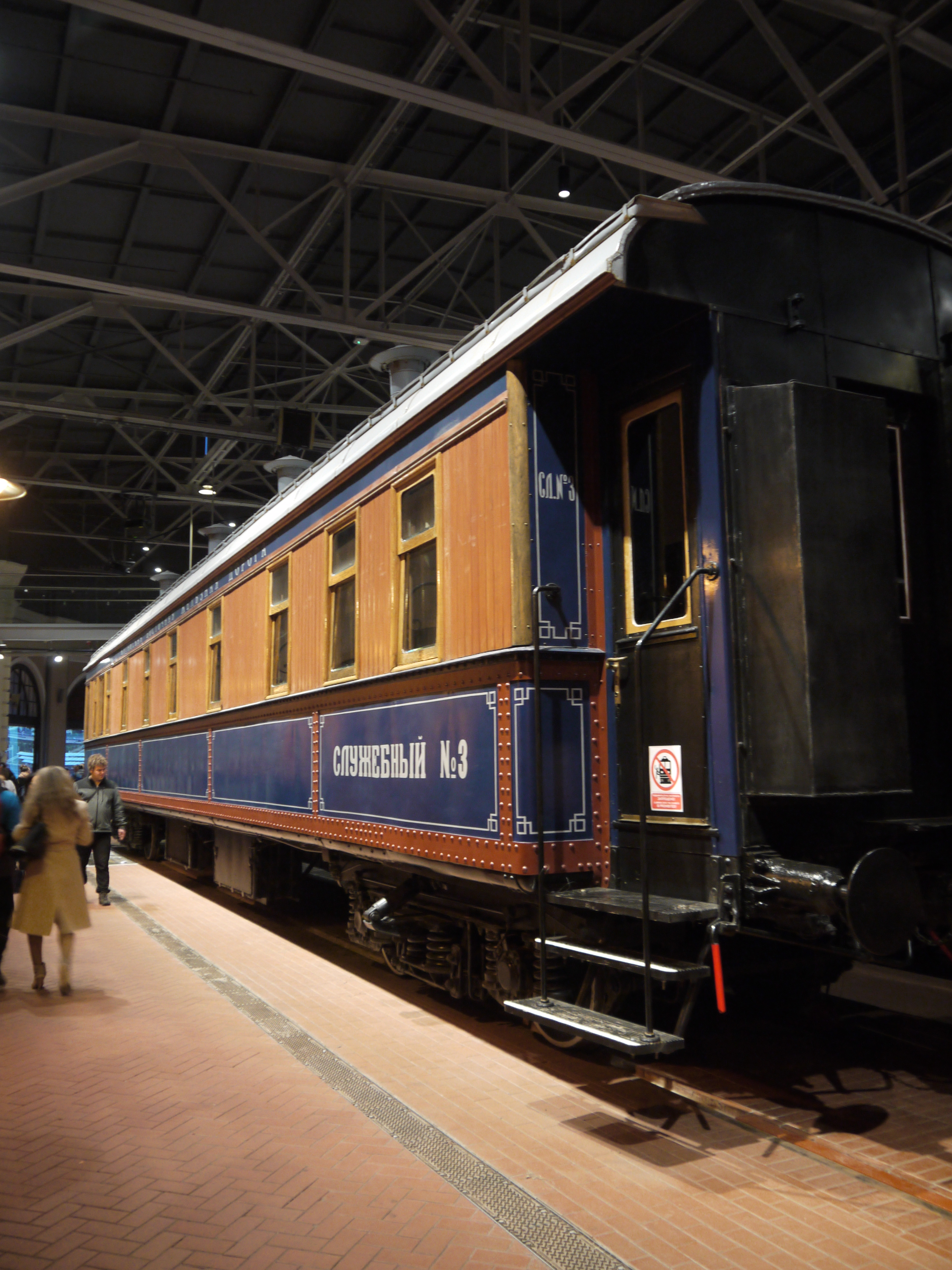
A CER executive car at the Russian Railway Museum

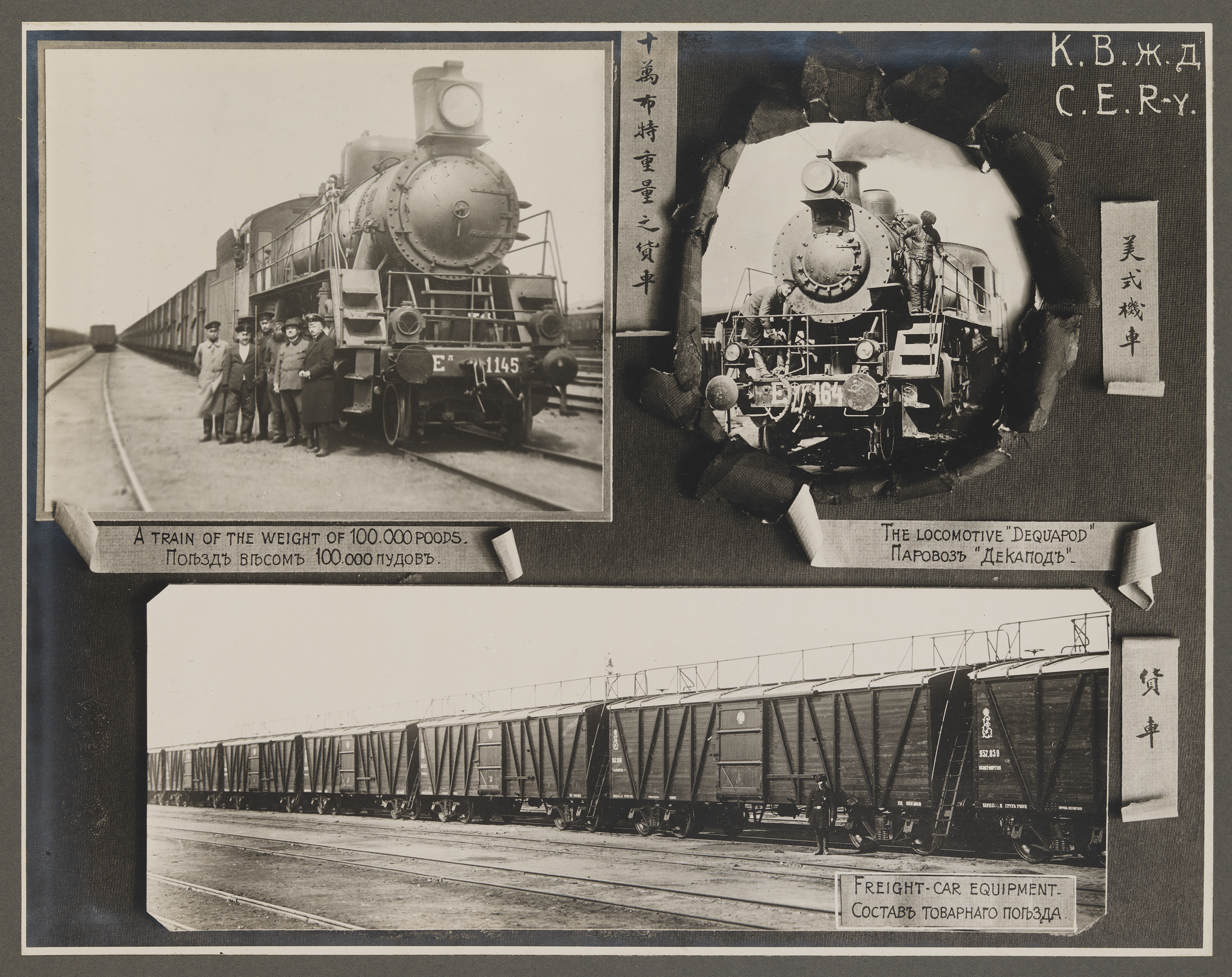
Locomotives and rolling stock of the CER

== Flags ==
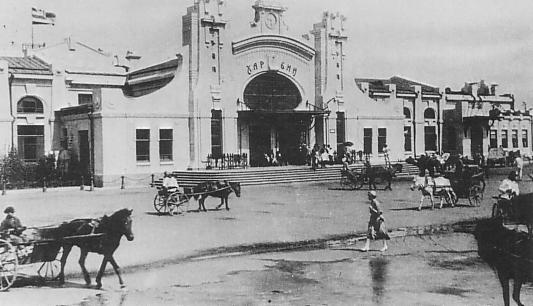
1915–1925 version of CER flag flying at the Harbin railway station

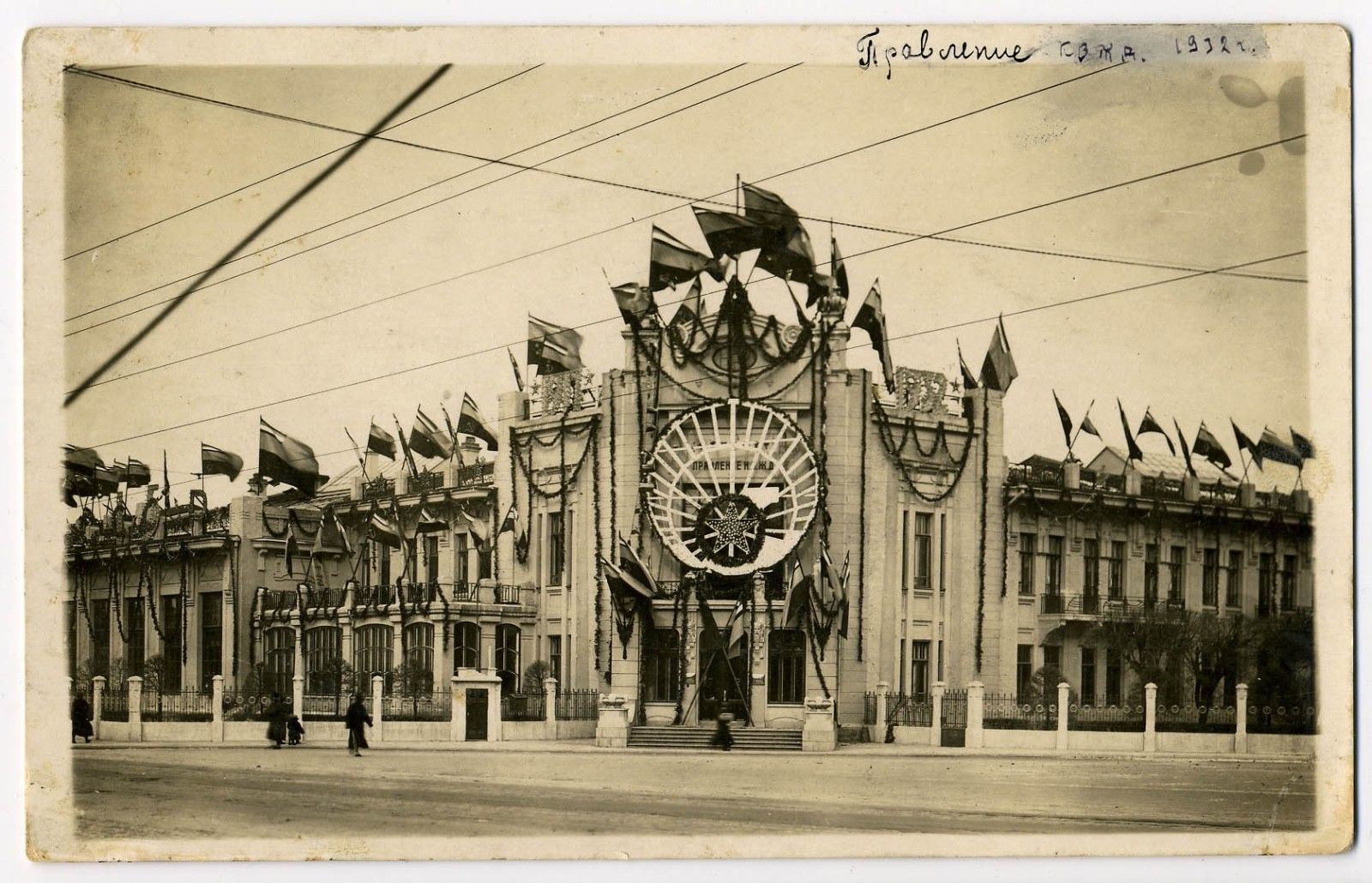
1932–1935 version of NMR flag in Harbin

The flag of the Chinese Eastern Railway is a combination of Chinese and Russian flags. It changed several times with the political changes of both owners. The first CER flag (1897–1915) was a combination of the triangular version of the flag of the Qing dynasty and the flag of Russia, with East Provinces Railway of Great Qing (大清東省鐵路) in Chinese. The 1915–1925 flag replaced the flag of the Qing dynasty with a triangular version of the five-colored flag, with East Provinces Railway Company of China (中國東省鐵路公司) in Chinese. The flag was changed again in 1925 and 1932, with the flag of the Soviet Union and the flag of Manchukuo added.

Flag used in 1897–1915

Flag of Chinese Eastern Railway Shipping Company

Flag used in 1915–1925

Flag used in 1925–1932

Flag used in 1932–1935

== Fleet ==
The only train that covers the entire route is the train #19/20 "Vostok" (translated as "East") Moscow — Beijing. The trip from Moscow to Beijing takes 146 hours (6 days, 2 hours). The journey in the opposite direction lasts 143 hours (5 days, 23 hours).

There is also a train #653/654 Zabaikalsk — Manzhouli which one can use to cross the Russian-Chinese border. The trip takes 25 minutes.

== See also ==
- Harbin–Manzhouli railway
- Harbin Russians
- Harbin–Suifenhe railway
- Kaiping Tramway and Imperial Railways of North China
- Russian Railway Museum, St.Petersburg
- Russian gauge
- Empire of Japan–Russian Empire relations
- History of Sino-Russian relations
