= Viktor Kurochkin =

Russian politician (1954–2026)

- Виктор Курочкин
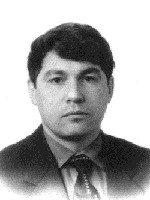
- Kurochkin in c. 2008

Member of the State Duma for Chita constituency
- In office 17 December 1995 – 17 January 2000
- Preceded by: Sergey Markidonov
- Succeeded by: Viktor Voytenko

Member of the Federation Council of Russia
- In office 11 January 1994 – 17 January 1996

Personal details
- Born: Viktor Vasilyevich Kurochkin; 10 January 1954 Tayna, Chita Oblast, Russian SFSR, USSR
- Died: 7 February 2026 (aged 72) Chita, Zabaykalsky Krai, Russia
- Party: CPSU (until 1990); FPDR (1994–2000); SPS (1999–2002); Liberal Russia (2002–2004); Yabloko (2018–2026)
- Other political affiliations: Chita Popular Front (1989–1991); DRM (1990–2007); Choice of Russia (1993); Native Zabaykalye (2000–2026); OGF (2005–2012)
- Education: Khabarovsk Higher Party School
- Occupation: Miner

Viktor Vasilyevich Kurochkin (Russian: Виктор Васильевич Курочкин; 10 January 1954 – 7 February 2026) was a Russian politician. A member of Democratic Russia, he served in the Federation Council from 1994 to 1996 and in the State Duma from 1995 to 2000.

Kurochkin died in Chita on 7 February 2026, at the age of 72.
