= Yerofey Pavlovich =

Yerofey Pavlovich Ерофей Павлович
- Work settlement
- Interactive map of Yerofey Pavlovich
- Location of Yerofey Pavlovich Yerofey Pavlovich (Amur Oblast)
- Coordinates: 53°57′0″N 121°57′00″E
- Country: Russia
- Federal subject: Amur Oblast

Population (2010 Census)
  - Total: 5,164
  - Estimate (2023): 4,239 (−17.9%)

Administrative status
  - Subordinated to: Skovorodinsky District
- Time zone: UTC+9 (MSK+6)
- Postal code: 676000
- OKTMO ID: 10649155051

Yerofey Pavlovich (Russian: Ерофе́й Па́влович) is an urban locality (a work settlement) in Skovorodinsky District of Amur Oblast, Russia, located at the Trans-Baikal Railway. Population: 5,164 (2010 census); 5,625 (2002 census); 6,748 (1989 Soviet census).

It was named after the explorer Yerofey Pavlovich Khabarov.

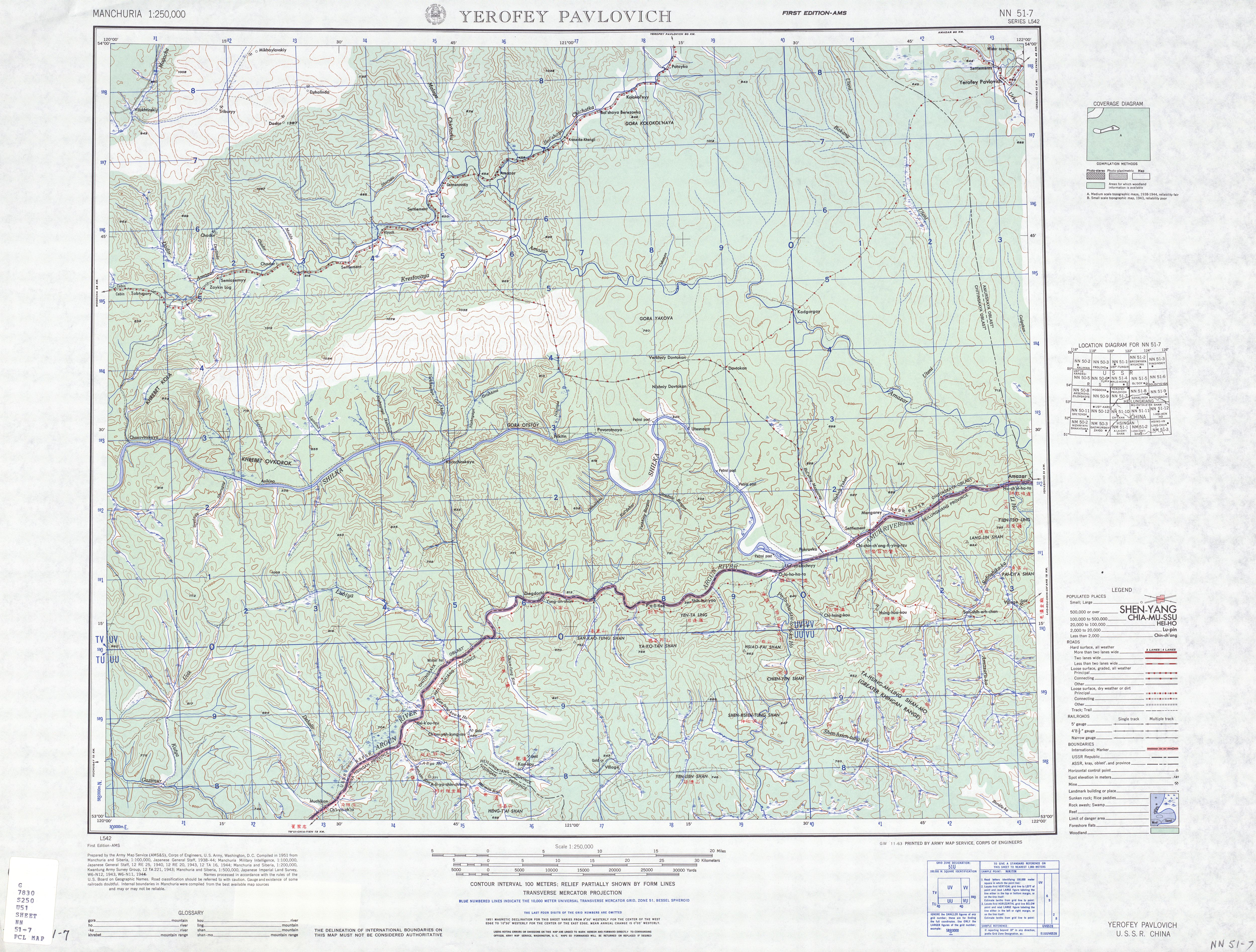
Yerofey Pavlovich (1951)
