= Tayna, Zabaykalsky Krai =

Tayna Тайна
- Selo
- Location within Zabaykalsky Krai Location within Russia
- Coordinates: 51°35′N 118°27′E
- Country: Russia
- Region: Zabaykalsky Krai
- District: Gazimuro-Zavodsky District
- Time zone: UTC+9:00

Tayna (Russian: Тайна) is a rural locality (a selo) in Gazimuro-Zavodsky District, Zabaykalsky Krai, Russia. Population: 448 (2021 census); 576 (2010 census); 602 (2002 census); There are 8 streets in this selo.

== Geography ==
This rural locality is located 9 km from Gazimursky Zavod (the district's administrative centre), 346 km from Chita (capital of Zabaykalsky Krai) and 5,604 km from Moscow. Kaldaga is the nearest rural locality.
