= Chita State Academy of Medicine =

Institution of higher education

- Established: 23 July 1953
- Rector: Zaytsev Dmitriy
- Academic staff: 5
- Students: 2,200
- Location: Chita, Zabaykalsky Krai, Russia; 52.0371°N 113.5100°E
- Website: http://chitgma.ru/ Building details
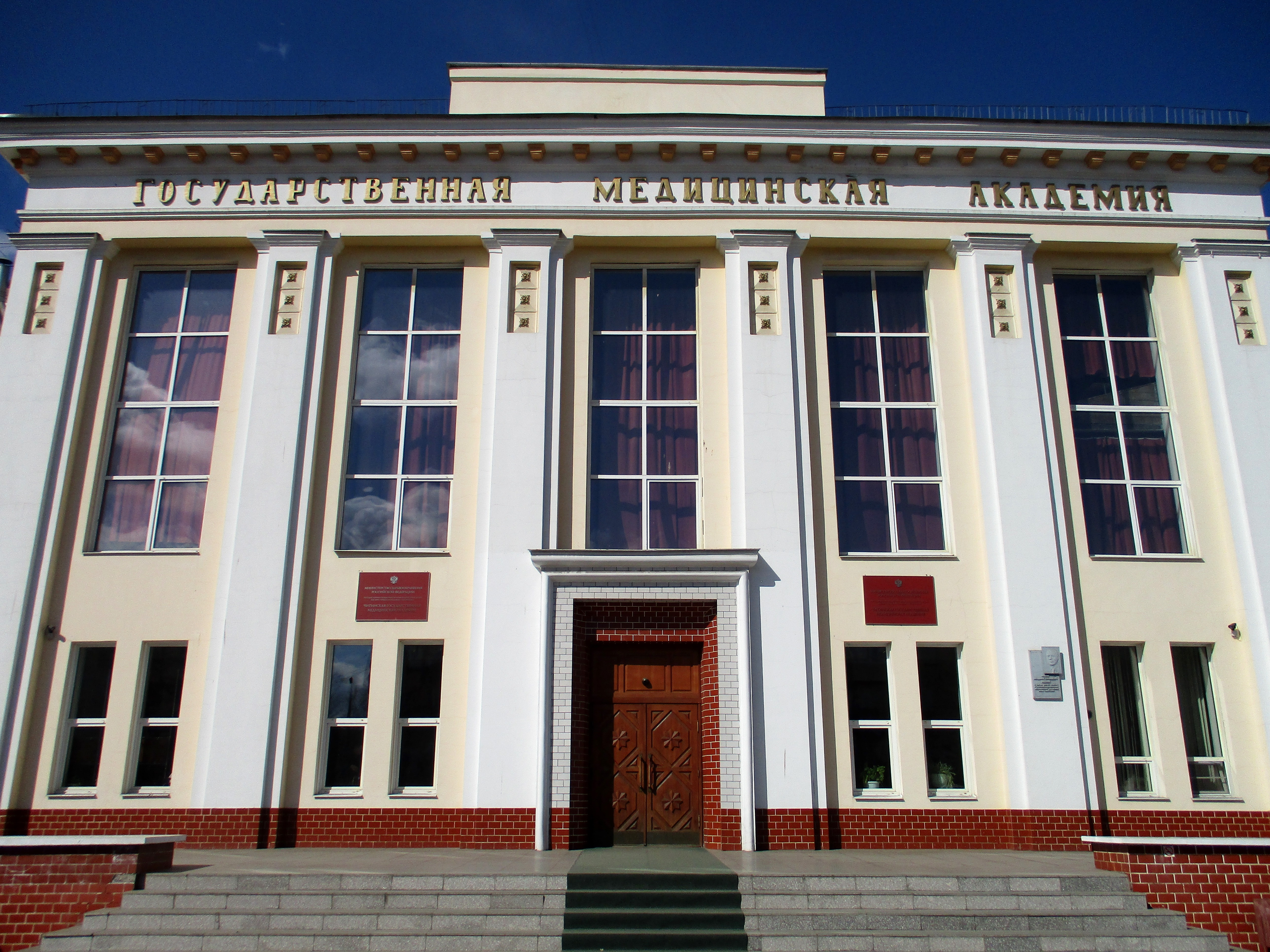

The Chita State Academy of Medicine (Russian: Читинская Государственная Медицинская Академия) is an institution of higher education in Chita, Russia. It was founded on 23 July 1953 as the Chita State Institute of Medicine. The institute was composed of the lecturers of the Perm Dentist Institute evacuated to Chita during World War II.

Following the collapse of the Soviet Union, the Chita State Institute of Medicine was renamed in 1995 when it was granted the new status becoming the Chita State Academy of Medicine.
