= Amur Railway =

Railway line in Russia

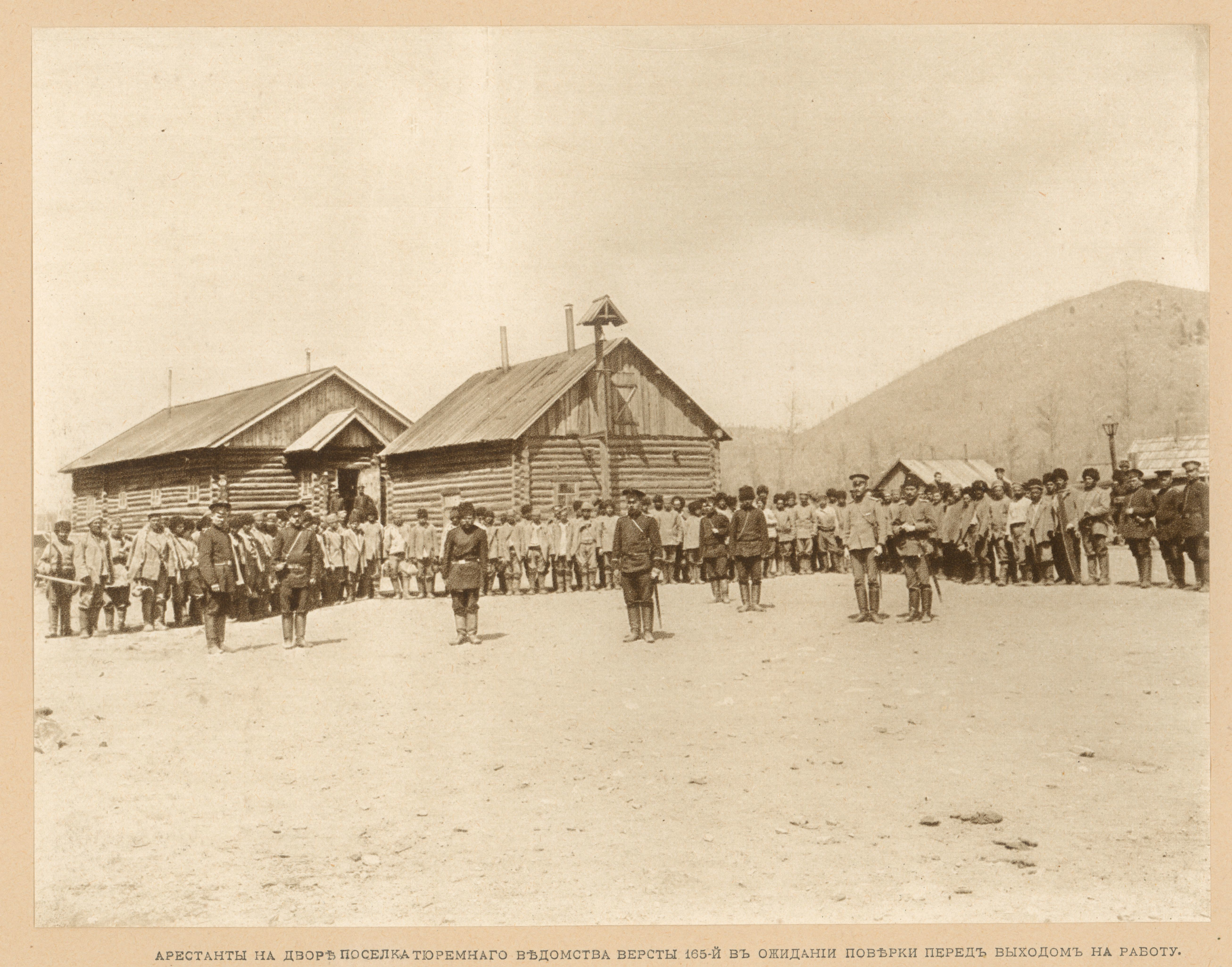
Russian prisoners going to work on the western section of the Amur Railway, early 20th century

The 1,520 mm (4 ft 11 27/32 in) broad gauge Amur Railway (Note: Russian: Амурская железная дорога, romanized: Amurskaja železnaja doroga, IPA: [ɐˈmurskəjə ʐɨˈlʲeznəjə dɐˈroɡə]) is the last section of the Trans-Siberian Railway in Russia, built in 1907–1916. The construction of this railway favoured the development of the gold mining industry, logging, fisheries and the fur trade in Siberia and Russian Far East. It is over 2115 km in length, stretching across the Transbaikal Region and the Amur Oblast. The railway's main sections are: Kuenga-Uryum (204 km, 1907–1911); Uryum-Kerak (632 km, 1909–1913); Kerak-Deya with an offshoot to Blagoveshchensk (679 km, 1911–1915); Deya-Khabarovsk (481 km, 1915–1916). Ye.Yu.Podrutsky, Alexander Liverovsky, and V.V.Tregubov were the chief engineers, who oversaw the construction of the Amur Railway by approx. 54,000 workers (as of 1913), brought from Central Russia and Siberia (the Tsarist government specifically forbade the use of foreign workforce).

== Construction ==
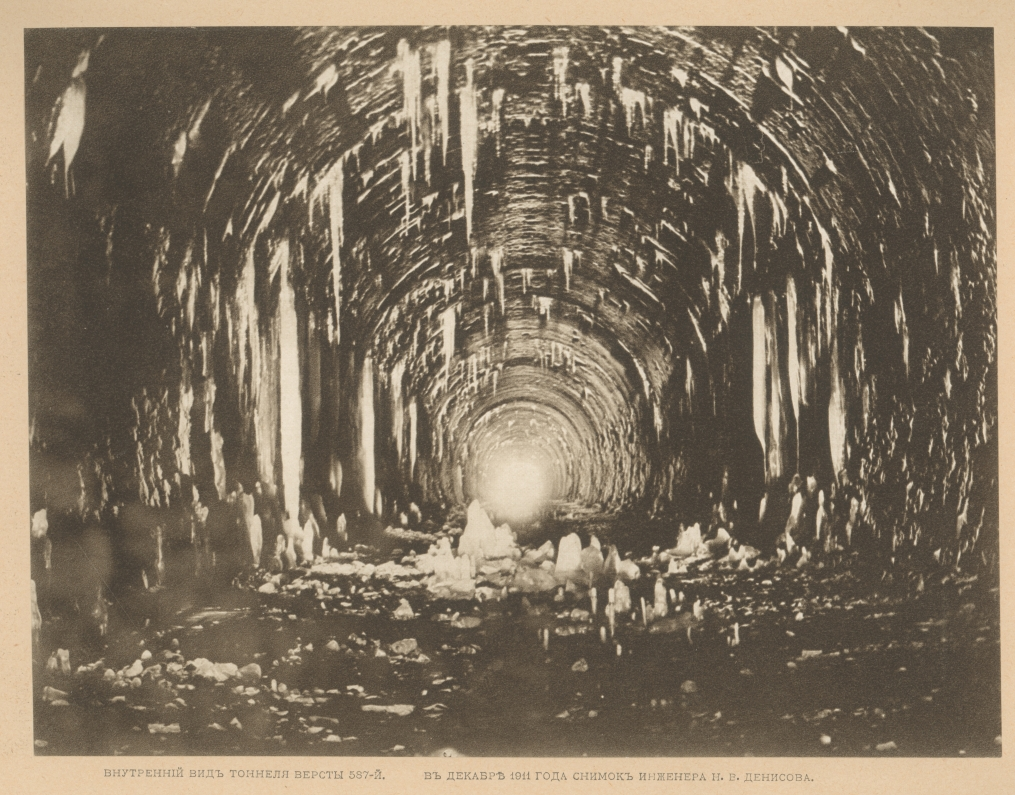
View inside a tunnel of the Amur Railway during construction

In 1905, the city duma of Blagoveshchensk, urged by local merchants and industrialists, turned to the Council of Ministers with a request to build the Amur section of the Transsib. The Council of Ministers approved the decision to construct the Amur Railway with the support of Pyotr Stolypin. On 3 April 1908, they issued a decree "On the Commencement of the Construction of the Amur Railway by the Order of and at the Expense of the State". The construction itself took place in scarcely populated permafrost areas under harsh climatic conditions. Construction sites were divided into the western, middle, and eastern sections. In 1907–1913, they built the western section of the railway from Kuenga to Uryum. First, the engineers had to connect the Shilka and the Amur with the railroad under construction in order to be able to deliver material and workforce. They had to build a temporary road in the swampy middle section of the future Amur Railway for the purpose of delivering the ballast for the line. Often, the whole finished parts of the road would disappear into the swamps. In 1912, a talented engineer Alexander Liverovsky was put in charge of the construction of the eastern section of the Amur Railway. For the first time in railroad construction, earth-moving works were mechanised. The workers used ten excavators and several machines for mortar mixing and rock grinding. Also, they built a number of repair shops and sawmills, therefore there was no need to transport railroad ties and squared timber to construction sites. In 1914, the western and eastern sections of the Amur Railway came together at the Obluchye railway station, making it possible for trains to go through.

== Interesting facts about the Amur Railway ==
The Amur Railway is known for its unique man-made structures, such as the Khabarovsk Bridge over the Amur River (considered the longest in Imperial Russia, Soviet Union, and Eurasia for decades; designed by Lavr Proskuryakov) and the first permafrost tunnel in the world with the use of insulation between its outer surface and the rock. At the suggestion of Alexander Liverovsky, the engineers devised a method of building piers with the use of heated concrete in below-zero weather conditions. They also built railway stations, railroad workshops, elementary schools and hospitals along the Amur Railway. Before the bridge was operational, they had arranged a train ferry in summertime and horse-drawn train platforms to cross the icebound Amur River in wintertime. In 1912, the government began issuing up to 400 rubles in allowances and necessary household articles to those workers who had decided to settle in this region.

The Amur Railway was put under the authority of the Ministry of Communications with its administration in Khabarovsk. In 1922, the railway was transferred to the authority of the People's Commissariat for Communications (Народный Комиссариат Путей Сообщения). In 1959, the Amur Railway and the Transbaikal section of the Transsib were merged to form the Transbaikal Railway.

The construction of the Amur Railway was completed before the outbreak of World War I and cost over 250,000 million rubles. The eastern section of the railroad alone cost 73 million rubles. The famous Norwegian explorer and geographer Fridtjof Nansen referred to the Trans-Siberian Railway as a "technical wonder". Its construction favoured the rapid development of formerly backward regions of Siberia and Far East.

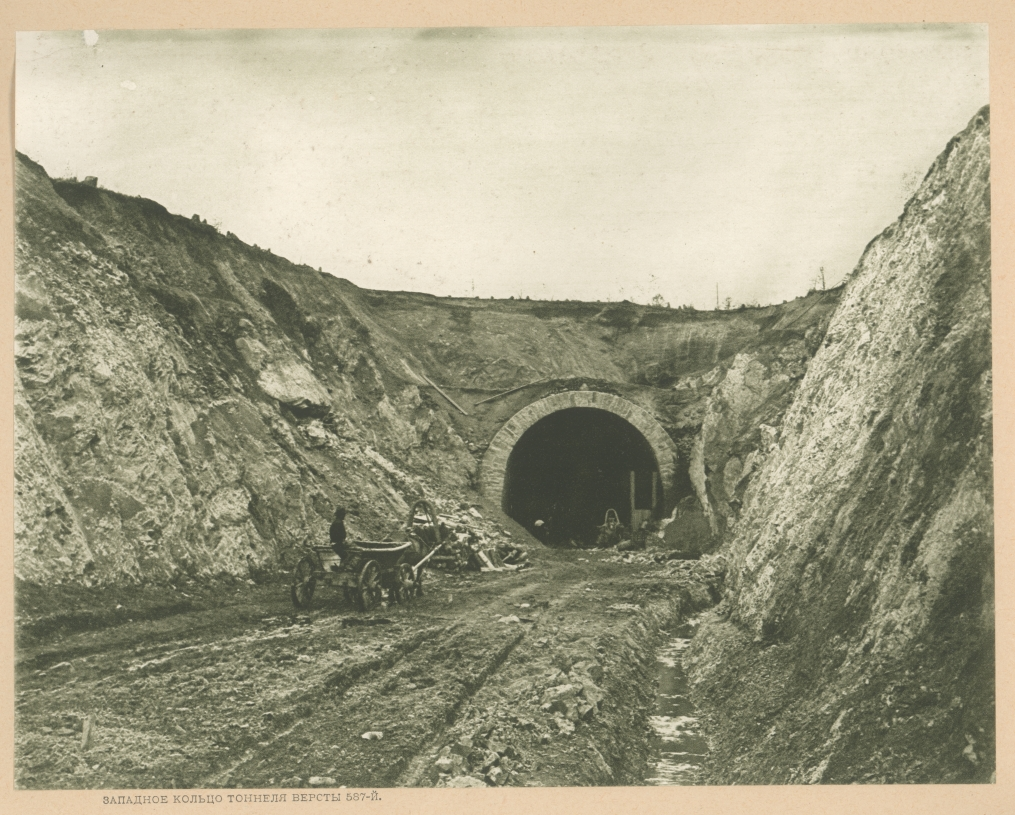
Western entrance to a tunnel on the Amur Railway during construction

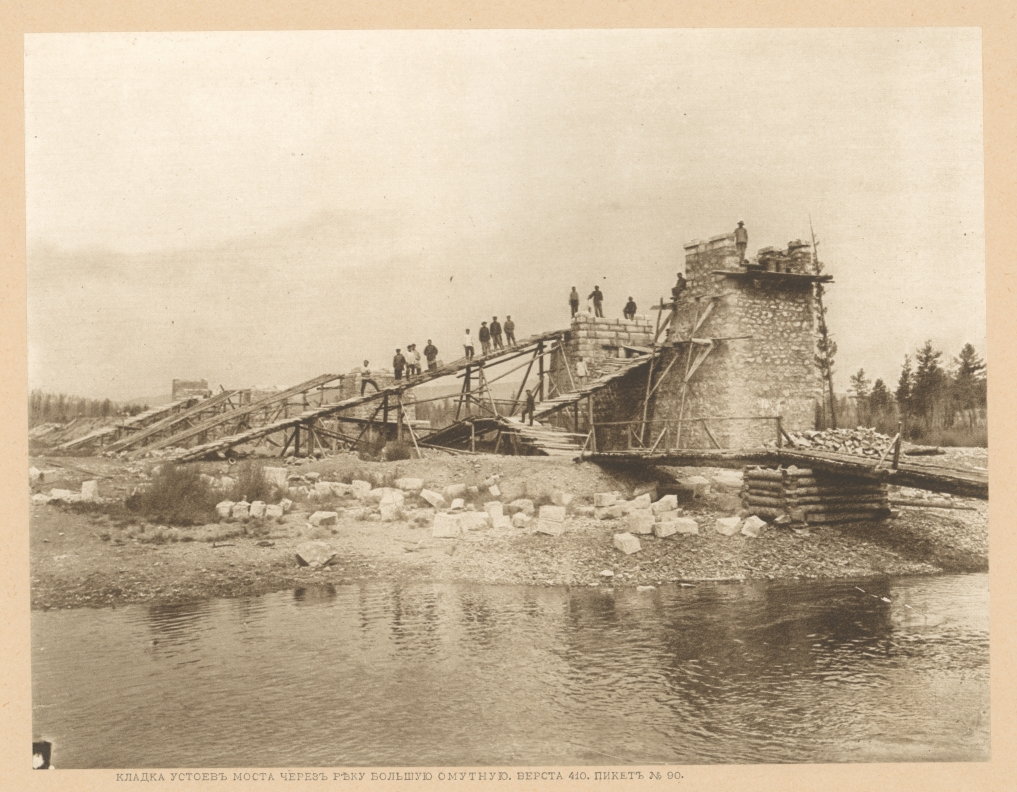
Railway workers at a construction over the river Bolshaya Omutnaya of the Amur Railway

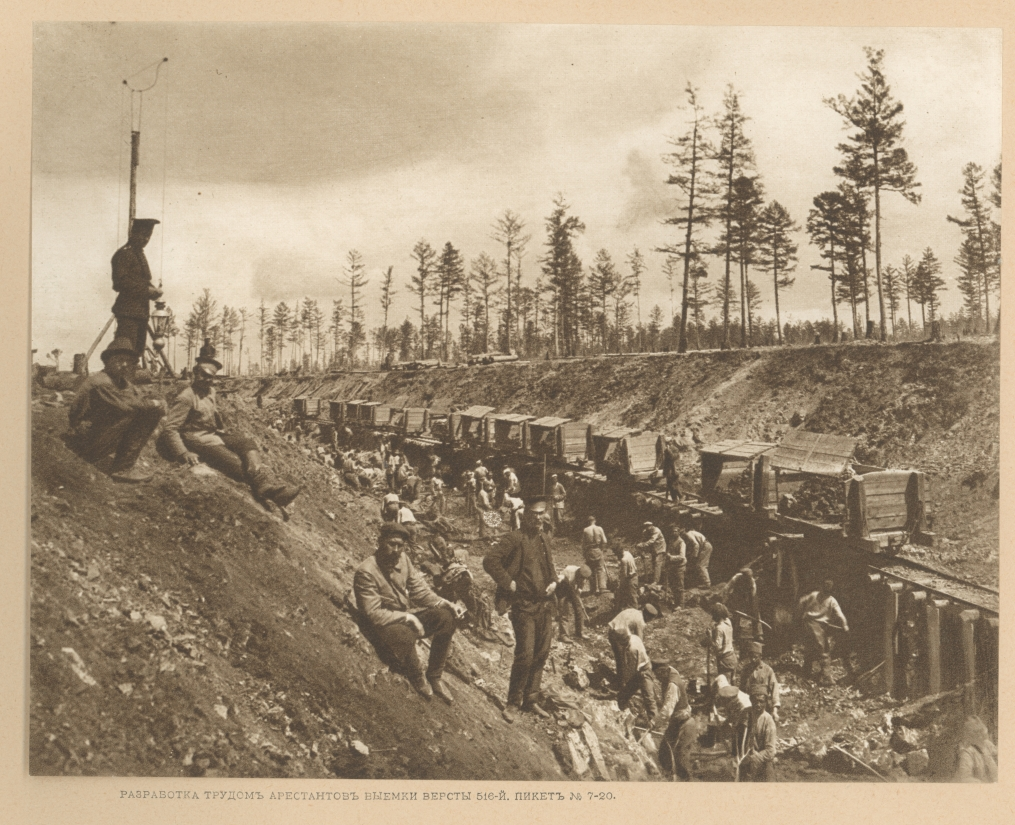
Russian prisoners at work on the Amur Railway

== See also ==
- Russian Railways
