= Transbaikal Railway =

Railway in Russia

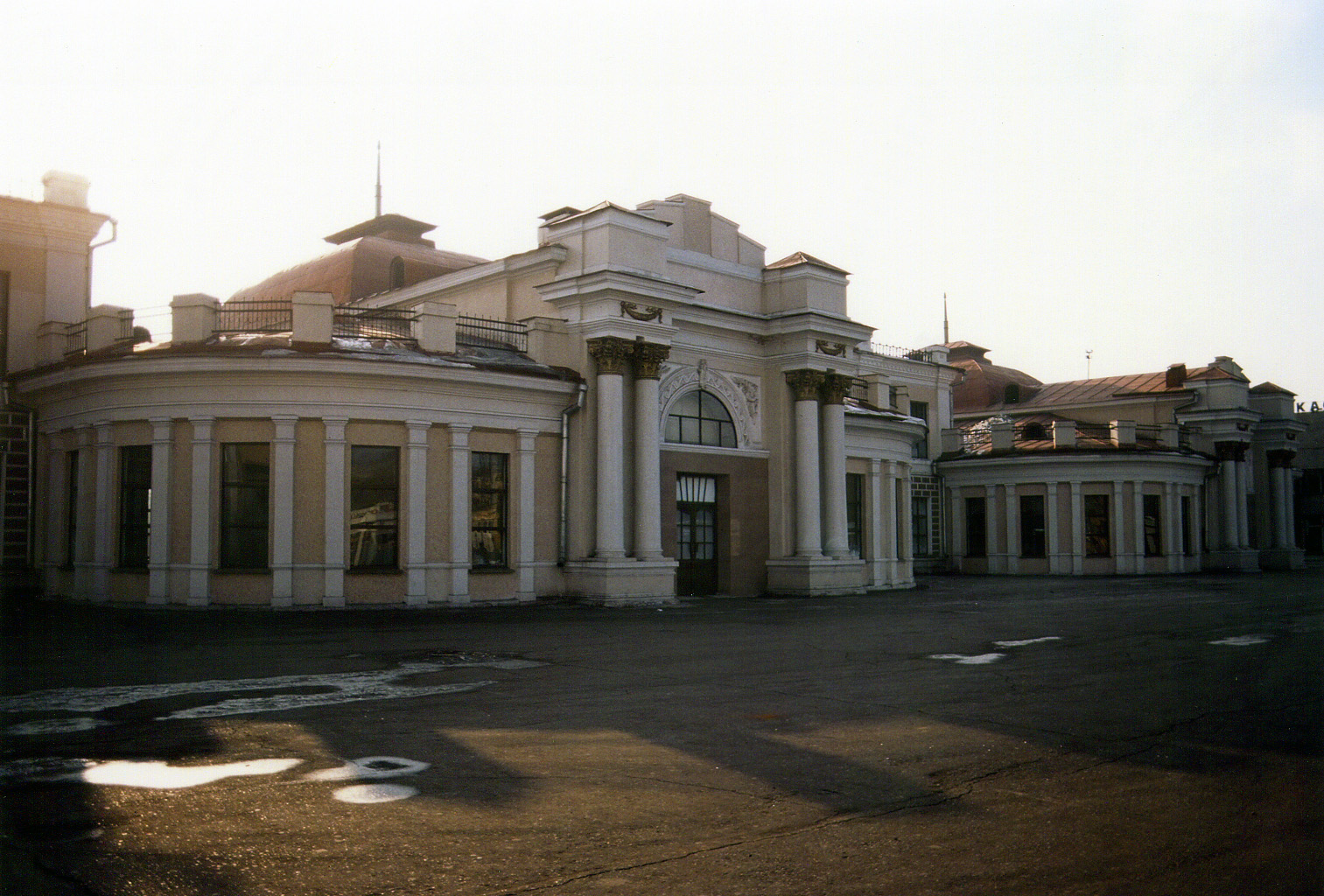
Train station in Chita

The Transbaikal Railway (Забайкальская железная дорога) is a subsidiary of the Russian Railways headquartered in Chita and serving Zabaykalsky Krai and Amur Oblast. The mainline was built between 1895 and 1905 as part of the Trans-Siberian Railway. It bordered the Circum-Baikal Railway on the west and the Chinese Eastern Railway on the east. The railway bore the name of Vyacheslav Molotov between 1936 and 1943. The Amur Railway became part of the network in 1959. As of 2009, the railway employs 46,741 people; its route length totals 3,336.1 km.

== See also ==
- Circum-Baikal Railway
- Transmongolian Railway
