= Chernyshevsk =

Chernyshevsk Чернышевск
- Town
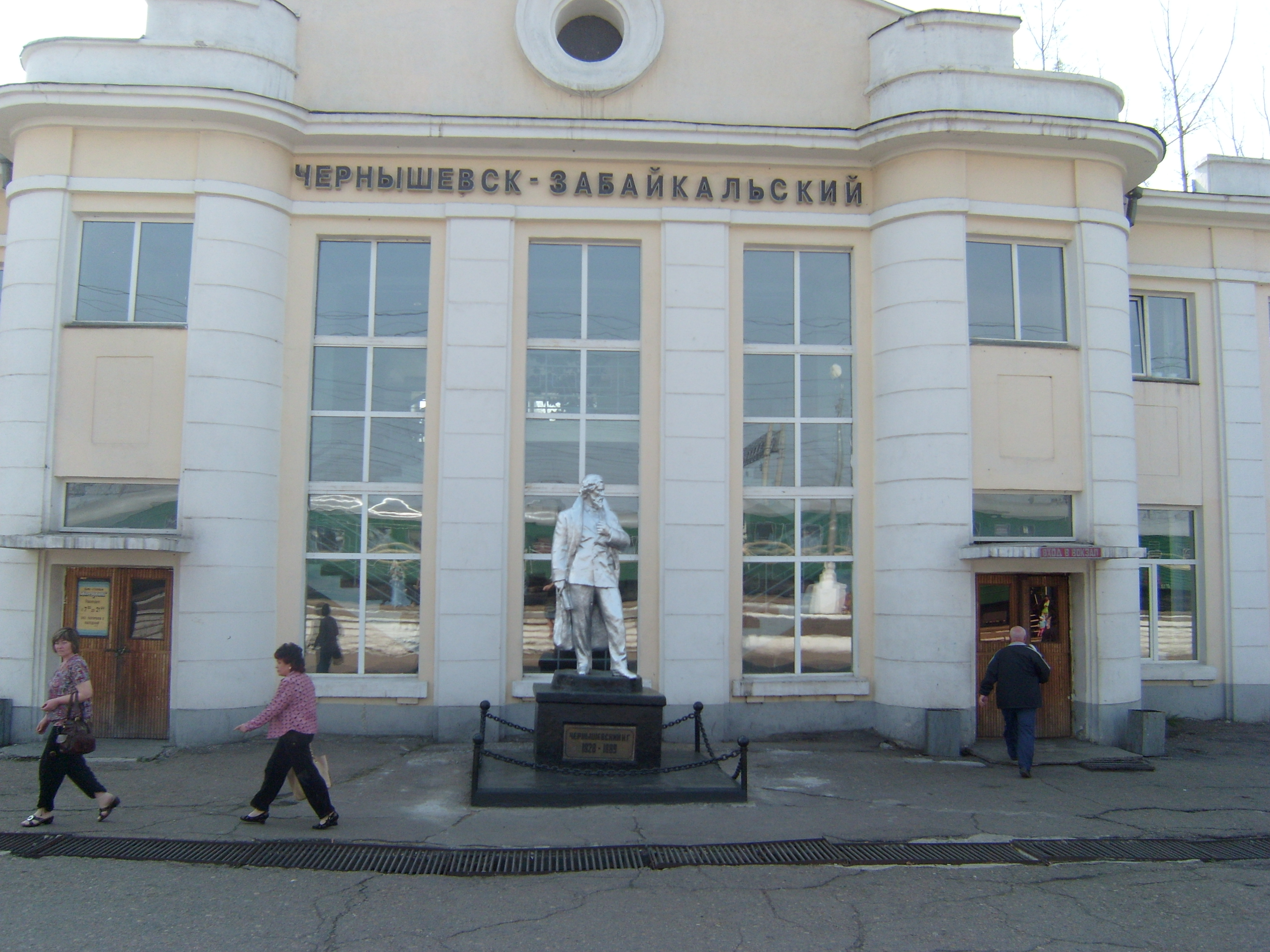
- Chernyshevsk railway station, May 2008
- Interactive map of Chernyshevsk
- Location of Chernyshevsk Chernyshevsk (Zabaykalsky Krai)
- Coordinates: 52°32′00″N 117°00′00″E
- Country: Russia
- Federal subject: Zabaykalsky Krai
- Administrative district: Chernyshevsky District
- Founded: 17th century
- Town status since: 1938

Population (2010 Census)
  - Total: 12,533
  - Estimate (2013): 13,246 (+5.7%)

Administrative status
  - Capital of: Chernyshevsky District
- Time zone: UTC+9 (MSK+6)
- Postal code: 673462
- Dialing code: +7 30265
- OKTMO ID: 76648151051

Chernyshevsk (Russian: Чернышевск, IPA: [t͡ɕɪrnɨˈʂɛfsk]) is an urban settlement and the administrative center of the Chernyshevsky District, Zabaykalsky Krai. The village is located on both sides of the river Aleur at its confluence with the river Kuenga, 389 kilometers (by rail) north-east of Chita.

== History ==
Originally Aleurskaya zaimka then Popovskaya settlement, which arose no earlier than 1670. In 1851, the peasants who lived in the settlement were attributed to the Cossack estate.

In 1908, Pashenny halt was built on Amur Railway on the other side of the river Aleur. During the construction of the railway, a builder's camp appeared and later became a village. In 1921 two settlements merged into one, named Chernyshevo. In 1928, a railway halt was reorganized into Pashennaya station.

District centre since 1934; urban settlement status since 1938.

New impetus to the development of the settlement was given by the construction of new sections of the Trans–Baikal Railway in 1933–1940. In those years new locomotive and wagon depots, a power station, a post house, a new railway station house and a school appeared. In 1936, the village received People's Commissar of Railways Lazar Kaganovich and for this reason the station was named after him: imeni Kaganovicha. In September 1957, the station was renamed to Chernyshevsk-Zabaykalsky, and the settlement imeni Kaganovicha to Chernyshevsk.
