= Chernyshevsky District =

Chernyshevsky District Чернышевский район (Russian)
- District
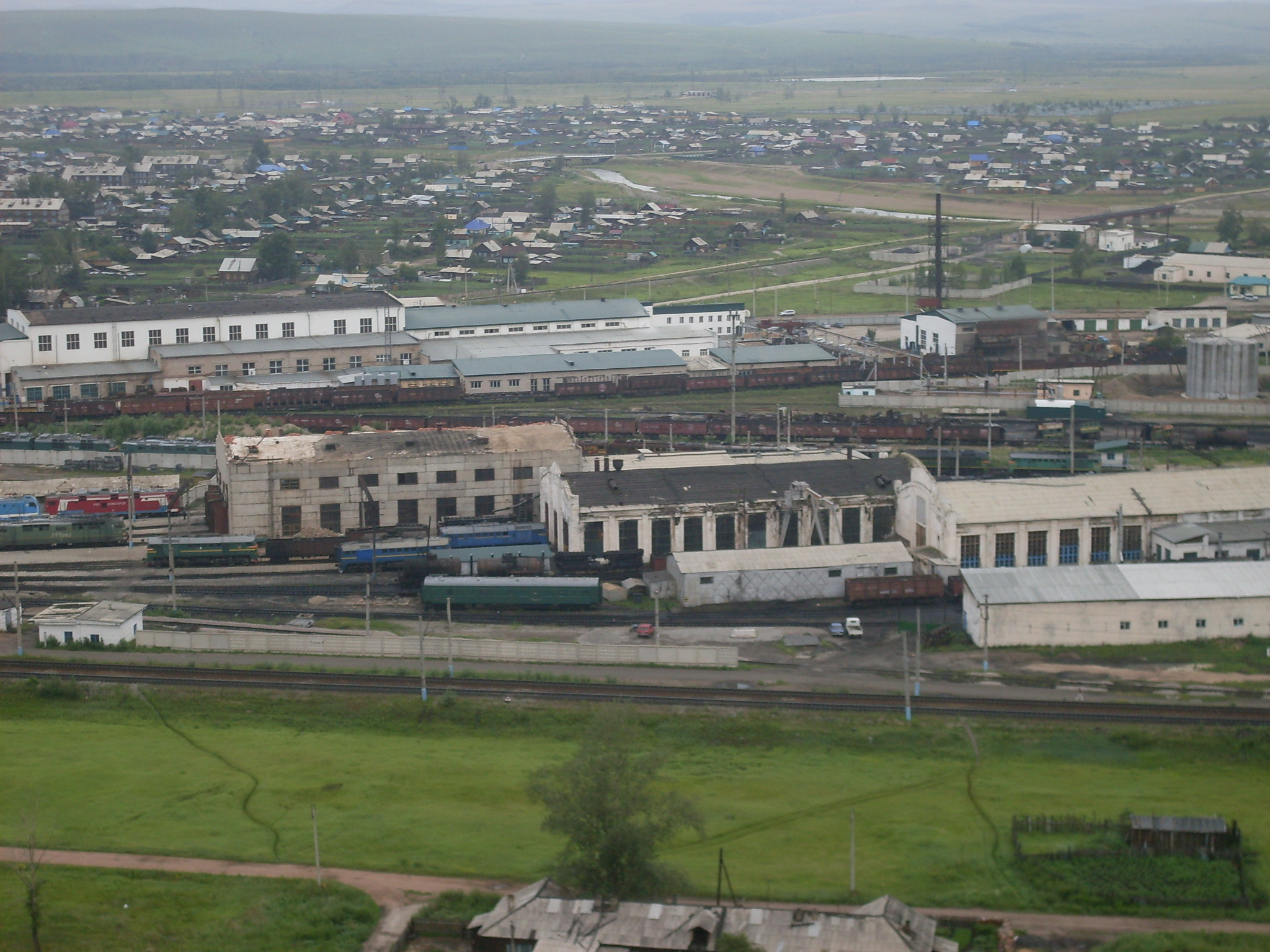
- Chernyshevsk rail yard, Chernyshevsky District

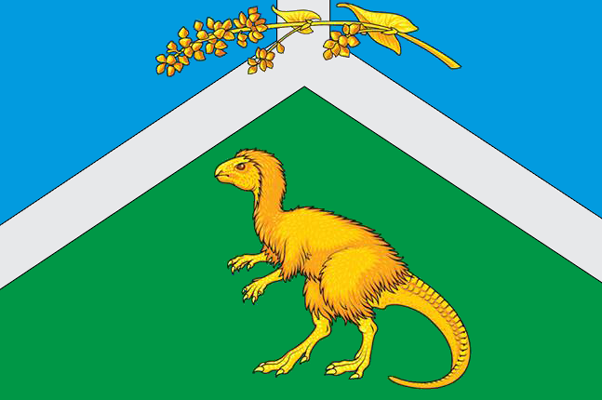
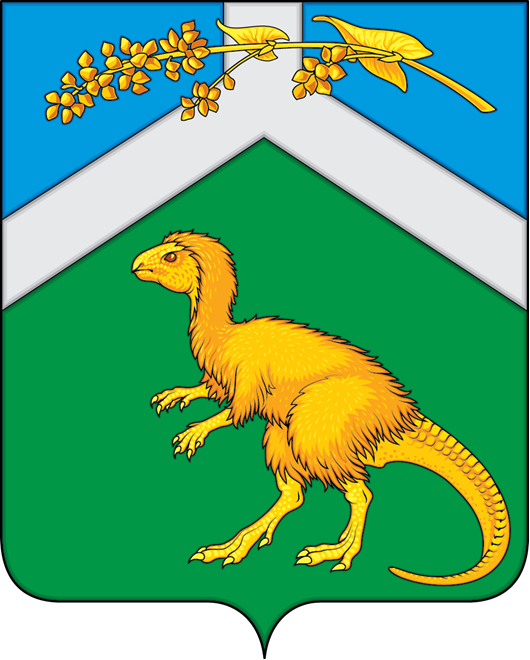
- Flag Coat of arms
- Location of Chernyshevsky District in Zabaykalsky Krai
- Coordinates: 52°56′N 117°17′E
- Country: Russia
- Federal subject: Zabaykalsky Krai
- Established: January 4, 1926 (first); January 1965 (second)
- Administrative center: Chernyshevsk

Area
  - Total: 13,200 km^{2} (5,100 sq mi)

Population (2010 Census)
  - Total: 35,019
  - Estimate (2018): 32,538 (−7.1%)
  - Density: 2.65/km^{2} (6.87/sq mi)
  - Urban: 67.8%
  - Rural: 32.2

Administrative structure
  - Inhabited localities: 4 urban-type settlements, 32 rural localities

Municipal structure
  - Municipally incorporated as: Chernyshevsky Municipal District
  - Municipal divisions: 4 urban settlements, 14 rural settlements
- Time zone: UTC+9 (MSK+6)
- OKTMO ID: 76648000

Population of Chernyshevsky District
- 2010 Census: 35,019
- 2002 Census: 38,146
- 1989 Census: 53,799
- 1979 Census: 47,534

Chernyshevsky District (Russian: Черныше́вский райо́н) is an administrative and municipal district (raion), one of the thirty-one in Zabaykalsky Krai, Russia. It is located in the center of the krai and borders Tungokochensky District in the north, Sretensky District in the east, District in the south, and Nerchinsky District in the west. The area of the district is 13,200 square kilometers (5,100 sq mi). Its administrative center is the urban locality (an urban-type settlement) of Chernyshevsk. As of the 2010 Census, the total population of the district was 35,019, with the population of Chernyshevsk accounting for 38.2% of that number.

== History ==
The district was established on January 4, 1926 by merging Chernyshevskaya, Kalininskaya, and Zyulzinskaya Volosts of Nerchinsky Uyezd. It was abolished and split between Mogochinsky, Nerchinsky, and Shilkinsky Districts in February 1963, but reinstated in modern borders in January 1965.

In 2010, a Konservat-Lagerstätte was discovered in the district, in the locality of Kulinda, part of the Ukureyskaya Formation. The feathered neornithischian dinosaur Kulindadromeus was described from the locality in 2014. It is featured on the district's flag and coat of arms.
