= Zarechny (inhabited locality) =

Zarechny (Russian: Заре́чный; masculine), Zarechnaya (Заре́чная; feminine), or Zarechnoye (Заре́чное; neuter) is the name of several inhabited localities in Russia.

== Modern inhabited localities ==
=== Altai Krai ===
As of 2010, four rural localities in Altai Krai bear this name:

- Zarechny, Pankrushikhinsky District, Altai Krai, a settlement in Pankrushikhinsky Selsoviet of Pankrushikhinsky District
- Zarechny, Smolensky District, Altai Krai, a settlement in Linevsky Selsoviet of Smolensky District
- Zarechny, Sovetsky District, Altai Krai, a settlement in Shulginsky Selsoviet of Sovetsky District
- Zarechnoye, Altai Krai, a selo in Tyagunsky Selsoviet of Kytmanovsky District

=== Amur Oblast ===
As of 2010, four rural localities in Amur Oblast bear this name:

- Zarechny, Amur Oblast, a settlement in Grodekovsky Rural Settlement of Blagoveshchensky District
- Zarechnoye, Arkharinsky District, Amur Oblast, a selo in Otvazhnensky Rural Settlement of Arkharinsky District
- Zarechnoye, Belogorsky District, Amur Oblast, a selo in Ozeryansky Rural Settlement of Belogorsky District
- Zarechnoye, Zeysky District, Amur Oblast, a selo in Amuro-Baltiysky Rural Settlement of Zeysky District

=== Astrakhan Oblast ===
As of 2010, one rural locality in Astrakhan Oblast bears this name:

- Zarechnoye, Astrakhan Oblast, a selo in Novogeorgiyevsky Selsoviet of Limansky District

=== Republic of Bashkortostan ===
As of 2010, two rural localities in the Republic of Bashkortostan bear this name:

- Zarechny, Blagovarsky District, Republic of Bashkortostan, a village in Yazykovsky Selsoviet of Blagovarsky District
- Zarechny, Gafuriysky District, Republic of Bashkortostan, a village in Krasnousolsky Selsoviet of Gafuriysky District

=== Belgorod Oblast ===
As of 2010, two rural localities in Belgorod Oblast bear this name:

- Zarechnoye, Borisovsky District, Belgorod Oblast, a selo in Strigunovsky Rural Okrug of Borisovsky District
- Zarechnoye, Chernyansky District, Belgorod Oblast, a khutor in Chernyansky District

=== Bryansk Oblast ===
As of 2010, four rural localities in Bryansk Oblast bear this name:

- Zarechny, Bryansk Oblast, a settlement in Knyagininsky Selsoviet of Sevsky District
- Zarechnoye, Bryansk Oblast, a selo in Yudinovsky Selsoviet of Pogarsky District
- Zarechnaya, Komarichsky District, Bryansk Oblast, a village in Bykhovsky Selsoviet of Komarichsky District
- Zarechnaya, Zhiryatinsky District, Bryansk Oblast, a village in Strashevichsky Selsoviet of Zhiryatinsky District

=== Republic of Buryatia ===
As of 2010, one urban locality in the Republic of Buryatia bears this name:

- Zarechny, Republic of Buryatia, an urban-type settlement under the administrative jurisdiction of Sovetsky City District of the City of Republic Significance of Ulan-Ude

=== Chelyabinsk Oblast ===
As of 2010, two rural localities in Chelyabinsk Oblast bear this name:

- Zarechny, Agapovsky District, Chelyabinsk Oblast, a settlement in Buranny Selsoviet of Agapovsky District
- Zarechny, Nagaybaksky District, Chelyabinsk Oblast, a settlement in Balkansky Selsoviet of Nagaybaksky District

=== Chuvash Republic ===
As of 2010, one rural locality in the Chuvash Republic bears this name:

- Zarechny, Chuvash Republic, a settlement in Nikulinskoye Rural Settlement of Poretsky District

=== Republic of Dagestan ===
As of 2010, one rural locality in the Republic of Dagestan bears this name:

- Zarechnoye, Republic of Dagestan, a selo in Krasnoarmeysky Selsoviet of Kizlyarsky District

=== Irkutsk Oblast ===
As of 2014, four rural localities in Irkutsk Oblast bear this name:

- Zarechny, Irkutsk Oblast, a settlement in Nukutsky District of Ust-Orda Buryat Okrug
- Zarechnoye, Kachugsky District, Irkutsk Oblast, a selo in Kachugsky District
- Zarechnoye, Tayshetsky District, Irkutsk Oblast, a selo in Tayshetsky District
- Zarechnoye, Alarsky District, Irkutsk Oblast, a village in Alarsky District of Ust-Orda Buryat Okrug

=== Ivanovo Oblast ===
As of 2010, one rural locality in Ivanovo Oblast bears this name:

- Zarechny, Ivanovo Oblast, a selo in Zavolzhsky District

=== Jewish Autonomous Oblast ===
As of 2010, one rural locality in the Jewish Autonomous Oblast bears this name:

- Zarechnoye, Jewish Autonomous Oblast, a selo in Obluchensky District

=== Kabardino-Balkar Republic ===
As of 2010, one rural locality in the Kabardino-Balkar Republic bears this name:

- Zarechnoye, Kabardino-Balkar Republic, a selo in Prokhladnensky District

=== Kaliningrad Oblast ===
As of 2010, two rural localities in Kaliningrad Oblast bear this name:

- Zarechnoye, Bagrationovsky District, Kaliningrad Oblast, a settlement in Nivensky Rural Okrug of Bagrationovsky District
- Zarechnoye, Krasnoznamensky District, Kaliningrad Oblast, a settlement in Alekseyevsky Rural Okrug of Krasnoznamensky District

=== Kaluga Oblast ===
As of 2010, two rural localities in Kaluga Oblast bear this name:

- Zarechny, Kaluga Oblast, a selo in Lyudinovsky District
- Zarechnaya, Kaluga Oblast, a village in Medynsky District

=== Karachay-Cherkess Republic ===
As of 2010, one rural locality in the Karachay-Cherkess Republic bears this name:

- Zarechny, Karachay-Cherkess Republic, a settlement in Prikubansky District

=== Republic of Karelia ===
As of 2010, one rural locality in the Republic of Karelia bears this name:

- Zarechny, Republic of Karelia, a settlement under the administrative jurisdiction of the city of republic significance of Kostomuksha

=== Kemerovo Oblast ===
As of 2010, four rural localities in Kemerovo Oblast bear this name:

- Zarechny, Guryevsky District, Kemerovo Oblast, a settlement in Sosnovskaya Rural Territory of Guryevsky District
- Zarechny, Mariinsky District, Kemerovo Oblast, a settlement in Bolsheantibesskaya Rural Territory of Mariinsky District
- Zarechny, Mezhdurechensky District, Kemerovo Oblast, a settlement in Kurtukovskaya Rural Territory of Mezhdurechensky District
- Zarechnoye, Kemerovo Oblast, a selo under the administrative jurisdiction of the town of oblast significance of Belovo

=== Republic of Khakassia ===
As of 2010, one rural locality in the Republic of Khakassia bears this name:

- Zarechnaya, Republic of Khakassia, a village in Pervomaysky Selsoviet of Bogradsky District

=== Khanty–Mansi Autonomous Okrug ===
As of 2010, one rural locality in Khanty–Mansi Autonomous Okrug bears this name:

- Zarechny, Khanty–Mansi Autonomous Okrug, a settlement in Oktyabrsky District

=== Kirov Oblast ===
As of 2010, three rural localities in Kirov Oblast bear this name:

- Zarechny, Kotelnichsky District, Kirov Oblast, a settlement in Makaryevsky Rural Okrug of Kotelnichsky District
- Zarechny, Urzhumsky District, Kirov Oblast, a settlement in Tsepochkinsky Rural Okrug of Urzhumsky District
- Zarechny, Verkhnekamsky District, Kirov Oblast, a settlement under the administrative jurisdiction of the urban-type settlement of Lesnoy, Verkhnekamsky District

=== Komi Republic ===
As of 2010, one rural locality in the Komi Republic bears this name:

- Zarechnoye, Komi Republic, a village in Kuratovo selo Administrative Territory of Sysolsky District

=== Krasnoyarsk Krai ===
As of 2010, two rural localities in Krasnoyarsk Krai bear this name:

- Zarechny, Kozulsky District, Krasnoyarsk Krai, a settlement in Zhukovsky Selsoviet of Kozulsky District
- Zarechny, Kuraginsky District, Krasnoyarsk Krai, a settlement in Detlovsky Selsoviet of Kuraginsky District

=== Kurgan Oblast ===
As of 2010, one rural locality in Kurgan Oblast bears this name:

- Zarechnaya, Kurgan Oblast, a village in Pervomaysky Selsoviet of Mishkinsky District

=== Lipetsk Oblast ===
As of 2010, three rural localities in Lipetsk Oblast bear this name:

- Zarechnoye, Lipetsk Oblast, a selo in Zarechensky Selsoviet of Terbunsky District
- Zarechnaya, Chaplyginsky District, Lipetsk Oblast, a village in Istobensky Selsoviet of Chaplyginsky District
- Zarechnaya, Dolgorukovsky District, Lipetsk Oblast, a village in Veselovsky Selsoviet of Dolgorukovsky District

=== Republic of Mordovia ===
As of 2010, three rural localities in the Republic of Mordovia bear this name:

- Zarechny, Kochkurovsky District, Republic of Mordovia, a settlement in Bulgakovsky Selsoviet of Kochkurovsky District
- Zarechny, Romodanovsky District, Republic of Mordovia, a settlement in Pushkinsky Selsoviet of Romodanovsky District
- Zarechnoye, Republic of Mordovia, a selo in Starozubarevsky Selsoviet of Krasnoslobodsky District

=== Moscow Oblast ===
As of 2010, two rural localities in Moscow Oblast bear this name:

- Zarechny, Kolomensky District, Moscow Oblast, a settlement in Biorkovskoye Rural Settlement of Kolomensky District
- Zarechny, Sergiyevo-Posadsky District, Moscow Oblast, a settlement in Lozovskoye Rural Settlement of Sergiyevo-Posadsky District

=== Nizhny Novgorod Oblast ===
As of 2010, six rural localities in Nizhny Novgorod Oblast bear this name:

- Zarechny, Bor, Nizhny Novgorod Oblast, a settlement in Lindovsky Selsoviet of the city of oblast significance of Bor
- Zarechny, Koverninsky District, Nizhny Novgorod Oblast, a settlement in Gorevsky Selsoviet of Koverninsky District
- Zarechny, Sharangsky District, Nizhny Novgorod Oblast, a settlement in Bolsheustinsky Selsoviet of Sharangsky District
- Zarechny, Varnavinsky District, Nizhny Novgorod Oblast, a settlement in Severny Selsoviet of Varnavinsky District
- Zarechnoye, Ardatovsky District, Nizhny Novgorod Oblast, a selo in Steksovsky Selsoviet of Ardatovsky District
- Zarechnoye, Arzamassky District, Nizhny Novgorod Oblast, a selo in Berezovsky Selsoviet of Arzamassky District

=== Novgorod Oblast ===
As of 2010, three rural localities in Novgorod Oblast bear this name:

- Zarechnaya, Batetsky District, Novgorod Oblast, a village in Peredolskoye Settlement of Batetsky District
- Zarechnaya, Borovichsky District, Novgorod Oblast, a village in Sushanskoye Settlement of Borovichsky District
- Zarechnaya, Okulovsky District, Novgorod Oblast, a village in Borovenkovskoye Settlement of Okulovsky District

=== Novosibirsk Oblast ===
As of 2010, two rural localities in Novosibirsk Oblast bear this name:

- Zarechny, Novosibirsk Oblast, a settlement in Kuybyshevsky District
- Zarechnoye, Novosibirsk Oblast, a selo in Toguchinsky District

=== Omsk Oblast ===
As of 2010, one rural locality in Omsk Oblast bears this name:

- Zarechnoye, Omsk Oblast, a selo in Zarechensky Rural Okrug of Novovarshavsky District

=== Orenburg Oblast ===
As of 2010, one rural locality in Orenburg Oblast bears this name:

- Zarechnoye, Orenburg Oblast, a selo in Zarechny Selsoviet of Tashlinsky District

=== Oryol Oblast ===
As of 2010, three rural localities in Oryol Oblast bear this name:

- Zarechny, Kolpnyansky District, Oryol Oblast, a settlement in Ushakovsky Selsoviet of Kolpnyansky District
- Zarechny, Uritsky District, Oryol Oblast, a settlement in Kotovsky Selsoviet of Uritsky District
- Zarechnaya, Oryol Oblast, a village in Stanovskoy Selsoviet of Orlovsky District

=== Penza Oblast ===
As of 2010, five inhabited localities in Penza Oblast bear this name:

- Zarechny, Penza Oblast, a town of oblast significance
- Zarechny, Mokshansky District, Penza Oblast, a rural locality (a settlement) in Uspensky Selsoviet of Mokshansky District
- Zarechny, Nikolsky District, Penza Oblast, a rural locality (a settlement) in Nochkinsky Selsoviet of Nikolsky District
- Zarechny, Nizhnelomovsky District, Penza Oblast, a rural locality (a settlement) in Verkhnelomovsky Selsoviet of Nizhnelomovsky District
- Zarechnaya, Penza Oblast, a rural locality (a village) in Yurovsky Selsoviet of Mokshansky District

=== Perm Krai ===
As of 2010, three rural localities in Perm Krai bear this name:

- Zarechnaya, Krasnokamsk, Perm Krai, a village under the administrative jurisdiction of the city of krai significance of Krasnokamsk
- Zarechnaya (Gamovskoye Rural Settlement), Permsky District, Perm Krai, a village in Permsky District; municipally, a part of Gamovskoye Rural Settlement of that district
- Zarechnaya (Yugo-Kamskoye Rural Settlement), Permsky District, Perm Krai, a village in Permsky District; municipally, a part of Yugo-Kamskoye Rural Settlement of that district

=== Primorsky Krai ===
As of 2010, two rural localities in Primorsky Krai bear this name:

- Zarechnoye, Ussuriysk, Primorsky Krai, a selo under the administrative jurisdiction of the Ussuriysk City Under Krai Jurisdiction
- Zarechnoye, Oktyabrsky District, Primorsky Krai, a selo in Oktyabrsky District

=== Rostov Oblast ===
As of 2010, four rural localities in Rostov Oblast bear this name:

- Zarechny, Kuybyshevsky District, Rostov Oblast, a khutor in Kuybyshevskoye Rural Settlement of Kuybyshevsky District
- Zarechny (khutor), Kommunarskoye Rural Settlement, Oktyabrsky District, Rostov Oblast, a khutor in Kommunarskoye Rural Settlement of Oktyabrsky District
- Zarechny (settlement), Kommunarskoye Rural Settlement, Oktyabrsky District, Rostov Oblast, a settlement in Kommunarskoye Rural Settlement of Oktyabrsky District
- Zarechny, Zernogradsky District, Rostov Oblast, a khutor in Gulyay-Borisovskoye Rural Settlement of Zernogradsky District

=== Sakha Republic ===
As of 2010, one rural locality in the Sakha Republic bears this name:

- Zarechny, Sakha Republic, a selo in Olyokminsky District

=== Sakhalin Oblast ===
As of 2010, one rural locality in Sakhalin Oblast bears this name:

- Zarechnoye, Sakhalin Oblast, a selo in Tomarinsky District

=== Saratov Oblast ===
As of 2010, four rural localities in Saratov Oblast bear this name:

- Zarechny, Dergachyovsky District, Saratov Oblast, a settlement in Dergachyovsky District
- Zarechny, Novouzensky District, Saratov Oblast, a khutor in Novouzensky District
- Zarechny, Pugachyovsky District, Saratov Oblast, a settlement in Pugachyovsky District
- Zarechnoye, Saratov Oblast, a selo in Balashovsky District

=== Stavropol Krai ===
As of 2010, one rural locality in Stavropol Krai bears this name:

- Zarechny, Stavropol Krai, a settlement in Gorkovsky Selsoviet of Novoalexandrovsky District

=== Sverdlovsk Oblast ===
- Zarechny, Sverdlovsk Oblast, a town of oblast significance

=== Tambov Oblast ===
As of 2010, three rural localities in Tambov Oblast bear this name:

- Zarechny, Kirsanovsky District, Tambov Oblast, a settlement in Kalaissky Selsoviet of Kirsanovsky District
- Zarechny, Morshansky District, Tambov Oblast, a settlement in Alkuzhborkovsky Selsoviet of Morshansky District
- Zarechnaya, Tambov Oblast, a village in Nikitinsky Selsoviet of Inzhavinsky District

=== Republic of Tatarstan ===
As of 2010, one rural locality in the Republic of Tatarstan bears this name:

- Zarechny, Republic of Tatarstan, a settlement in Nurlatsky District

=== Tomsk Oblast ===
As of 2010, three rural localities in Tomsk Oblast bear this name:

- Zarechny, Pervomaysky District, Tomsk Oblast, a settlement in Pervomaysky District
- Zarechny (Mezheninovskoye Rural Settlement), Tomsky District, Tomsk Oblast, a settlement in Tomsky District; municipally, a part of Mezheninovskoye Rural Settlement of that district
- Zarechny (Malinovskoye Rural Settlement), Tomsky District, Tomsk Oblast, a settlement in Tomsky District; municipally, a part of Malinovskoye Rural Settlement of that district

=== Tver Oblast ===
As of 2010, two rural localities in Tver Oblast bear this name:

- Zarechnaya, Firovsky District, Tver Oblast, a village in Firovsky District
- Zarechnaya, Rzhevsky District, Tver Oblast, a village in Rzhevsky District

=== Tyumen Oblast ===
As of 2010, two rural localities in Tyumen Oblast bear this name:

- Zarechny, Vagaysky District, Tyumen Oblast, a settlement in Zarechensky Rural Okrug of Vagaysky District
- Zarechny, Yarkovsky District, Tyumen Oblast, a settlement in Shchetkovsky Rural Okrug of Yarkovsky District

=== Udmurt Republic ===
As of 2010, two rural localities in the Udmurt Republic bear this name:

- Zarechny, Balezinsky District, Udmurt Republic, a selo in Voyegurtsky Selsoviet of Balezinsky District
- Zarechny, Grakhovsky District, Udmurt Republic, a selo in Porymozarechny Selsoviet of Grakhovsky District

=== Ulyanovsk Oblast ===
As of 2010, one rural locality in Ulyanovsk Oblast bears this name:

- Zarechnoye, Ulyanovsk Oblast, a selo under the administrative jurisdiction of Starotimoshkinsky Settlement Okrug of Baryshsky District

=== Vladimir Oblast ===
As of 2010, two rural localities in Vladimir Oblast bear this name:

- Zarechny, Vladimir Oblast, a settlement in Vyaznikovsky District
- Zarechnoye, Vladimir Oblast, a selo in Sobinsky District

=== Volgograd Oblast ===
As of 2010, one rural locality in Volgograd Oblast bears this name:

- Zarechny, Volgograd Oblast, a settlement in Gornopolyansky Selsoviet of Volgograd

=== Vologda Oblast ===
As of 2010, six rural localities in Vologda Oblast bear this name:

- Zarechny, Vologda Oblast, a settlement in Lipino-Borsky Selsoviet of Vashkinsky District
- Zarechnoye, Vologda Oblast, a village in Domshinsky Selsoviet of Sheksninsky District
- Zarechnaya, Shapshinsky Selsoviet, Kharovsky District, Vologda Oblast, a village in Shapshinsky Selsoviet of Kharovsky District
- Zarechnaya, Shevnitsky Selsoviet, Kharovsky District, Vologda Oblast, a village in Shevnitsky Selsoviet of Kharovsky District
- Zarechnaya, Vologodsky District, Vologda Oblast, a village in Oktyabrsky Selsoviet of Vologodsky District
- Zarechnaya, Vozhegodsky District, Vologda Oblast, a village in Nizhneslobodsky Selsoviet of Vozhegodsky District

=== Voronezh Oblast ===
As of 2010, one rural locality in Voronezh Oblast bears this name:

- Zarechny, Voronezh Oblast, a settlement in Verkhneikoretskoye Rural Settlement of Bobrovsky District

=== Yaroslavl Oblast ===
As of 2010, two rural localities in Yaroslavl Oblast bear this name:

- Zarechny, Yaroslavl Oblast, a settlement in Lyubilkovsky Rural Okrug of Rostovsky District
- Zarechnoye, Yaroslavl Oblast, a village in Uritsky Rural Okrug of Pervomaysky District

=== Zabaykalsky Krai ===
As of 2010, two rural localities in Zabaykalsky Krai bear this name:

- Zarechny, Zabaykalsky Krai, a settlement in Nerchinsky District
- Zarechnoye, Zabaykalsky Krai, a selo in Tungiro-Olyokminsky District

== Abolished inhabited localities ==
- Zarechny, Ryazan Oblast, a former urban-type settlement in Ryazan Oblast; since 2004—a part of the town of Skopin
