= Zarya, Russia =

Zarya (Russian: Заря́) is the name of several rural localities in Russia.

== Republic of Adygea ==
As of 2010, one rural locality in the Republic of Adygea bears this name:

- Zarya, Republic of Adygea, a settlement in Teuchezhsky District

== Altai Krai ==
As of 2010, two rural localities in Altai Krai bear this name:

- Zarya, Biysky District, Altai Krai, a settlement in Zarinsky Selsoviet of Biysky District
- Zarya, Pankrushikhinsky District, Altai Krai, a settlement in Uryvayevsky Selsoviet of Pankrushikhinsky District

== Republic of Bashkortostan ==
As of 2010, two rural localities in the Republic of Bashkortostan bear this name:

- Zarya, Arkhangelsky District, Republic of Bashkortostan, a village in Arkh-Latyshsky Selsoviet of Arkhangelsky District
- Zarya, Davlekanovsky District, Republic of Bashkortostan, a village in Bik-Karmalinsky Selsoviet of Davlekanovsky District

== Bryansk Oblast ==
As of 2010, seven rural localities in Bryansk Oblast bear this name:

- Zarya, Brasovsky District, Bryansk Oblast, a settlement in Stolbovsky Rural Administrative Okrug of Brasovsky District
- Zarya, Dubrovsky District, Bryansk Oblast, a settlement under the administrative jurisdiction of Dubrovsky Settlement Administrative Okrug of Dubrovsky District
- Zarya, Korzhovogolubovsky Rural Administrative Okrug, Klintsovsky District, Bryansk Oblast, a settlement in Korzhovogolubovsky Rural Administrative Okrug of Klintsovsky District
- Zarya, Korzhovogolubovsky Rural Administrative Okrug, Klintsovsky District, Bryansk Oblast, a settlement in Korzhovogolubovsky Rural Administrative Okrug of Klintsovsky District
- Zarya, Fedorovsky Rural Administrative Okrug, Rognedinsky District, Bryansk Oblast, a settlement in Fedorovsky Rural Administrative Okrug of Rognedinsky District
- Zarya, Fedorovsky Rural Administrative Okrug, Rognedinsky District, Bryansk Oblast, a settlement in Fedorovsky Rural Administrative Okrug of Rognedinsky District
- Zarya, Sevsky District, Bryansk Oblast, a settlement in Troyebortnovsky Rural Administrative Okrug of Sevsky District

== Chelyabinsk Oblast ==
As of 2010, one rural locality in Chelyabinsk Oblast bears this name:

- Zarya, Chelyabinsk Oblast, a settlement in Katsbakhsky Selsoviet of Kizilsky District

== Irkutsk Oblast ==
As of 2010, one rural locality in Irkutsk Oblast bears this name:

- Zarya, Irkutsk Oblast, a settlement in Mamsko-Chuysky District

== Kaliningrad Oblast ==
As of 2010, one rural locality in Kaliningrad Oblast bears this name:

- Zarya, Kaliningrad Oblast, a settlement in Svobodnensky Rural Okrug of Chernyakhovsky District

== Kaluga Oblast ==
As of 2010, two rural localities in Kaluga Oblast bear this name:

- Zarya, Khvastovichsky District, Kaluga Oblast, a selo in Khvastovichsky District
- Zarya, Kirovsky District, Kaluga Oblast, a village in Kirovsky District

== Kemerovo Oblast ==
As of 2010, four rural localities in Kemerovo Oblast bear this name:

- Zarya, Belovsky District, Kemerovo Oblast, a settlement in Staropesterevskaya Rural Territory of Belovsky District
- Zarya, Guryevsky District, Kemerovo Oblast, a settlement in Urskaya Rural Territory of Guryevsky District
- Zarya, Kemerovsky District, Kemerovo Oblast, a village in Yagunovskaya Rural Territory of Kemerovsky District
- Zarya, Tyazhinsky District, Kemerovo Oblast, a settlement in Listvyanskaya Rural Territory of Tyazhinsky District

== Republic of Khakassia ==
As of 2010, one rural locality in the Republic of Khakassia bears this name:

- Zarya, Republic of Khakassia, a village in Opytnensky Selsoviet of Ust-Abakansky District

== Kirov Oblast ==
As of 2010, one rural locality in Kirov Oblast bears this name:

- Zarya, Kirov Oblast, a settlement in Zarinsky Rural Okrug of Oparinsky District

== Kostroma Oblast ==
As of 2010, one rural locality in Kostroma Oblast bears this name:

- Zarya, Kostroma Oblast, a village in Orekhovskoye Settlement of Galichsky District

== Krasnodar Krai ==
As of 2010, nine rural localities in Krasnodar Krai bear this name:

- Zarya, Anapsky District, Krasnodar Krai, a khutor in Gaykodzorsky Rural Okrug of Anapsky District
- Zarya, Bryukhovetsky District, Krasnodar Krai, a settlement in Baturinsky Rural Okrug of Bryukhovetsky District
- Zarya, Gulkevichsky District, Krasnodar Krai, a settlement in Ventsy-Zarya Rural Okrug of Gulkevichsky District
- Zarya, Krasnoarmeysky District, Krasnodar Krai, a settlement in Oktyabrsky Rural Okrug of Krasnoarmeysky District
- Zarya, Labinsky District, Krasnodar Krai, a khutor in Pervosinyukhinsky Rural Okrug of Labinsky District
- Zarya, Novopokrovsky District, Krasnodar Krai, a settlement in Nezamayevsky Rural Okrug of Novopokrovsky District
- Zarya, Starominsky District, Krasnodar Krai, a settlement in Rassvetovsky Rural Okrug of Starominsky District
- Zarya, Vyselkovsky District, Krasnodar Krai, a selo in Berezansky Rural Okrug of Vyselkovsky District
- Zarya, Yeysky District, Krasnodar Krai, a settlement in Trudovoy Rural Okrug of Yeysky District

== Kurgan Oblast ==
As of 2010, one rural locality in Kurgan Oblast bears this name:

- Zarya, Kurgan Oblast, a village in Chashinsky Selsoviet of Kargapolsky District

== Kursk Oblast ==
As of 2010, two rural localities in Kursk Oblast bear this name:

- Zarya, Glushkovsky District, Kursk Oblast, a khutor in Popovo-Lezhachansky Selsoviet of Glushkovsky District
- Zarya, Rylsky District, Kursk Oblast, a settlement in Nikolnikovsky Selsoviet of Rylsky District

== Lipetsk Oblast ==
As of 2010, four rural localities in Lipetsk Oblast bear this name:

- Zarya, Mazeysky Selsoviet, Dobrinsky District, Lipetsk Oblast, a village in Mazeysky Selsoviet of Dobrinsky District
- Zarya, Pushkinsky Selsoviet, Dobrinsky District, Lipetsk Oblast, a village in Pushkinsky Selsoviet of Dobrinsky District
- Zarya, Izmalkovsky District, Lipetsk Oblast, a settlement in Lebyazhensky Selsoviet of Izmalkovsky District
- Zarya, Zadonsky District, Lipetsk Oblast, a village in Olshansky Selsoviet of Zadonsky District

== Republic of Mordovia ==
As of 2010, three rural localities in the Republic of Mordovia bear this name:

- Zarya, Insarsky District, Republic of Mordovia, a settlement under the administrative jurisdiction of the town of district significance of Insar in Insarsky District
- Zarya, Kovylkinsky District, Republic of Mordovia, a settlement in Kazenno-Maydansky Selsoviet of Kovylkinsky District
- Zarya, Zubovo-Polyansky District, Republic of Mordovia, a settlement in Vadovo-Selishchinsky Selsoviet of Zubovo-Polyansky District

== Nizhny Novgorod Oblast ==
As of 2010, three rural localities in Nizhny Novgorod Oblast bear this name:

- Zarya, Bor, Nizhny Novgorod Oblast, a settlement in Pamyat Parizhskoy Kommuny Selsoviet under the administrative jurisdiction of the town of oblast significance of Bor
- Zarya, Pilninsky District, Nizhny Novgorod Oblast, a village in Bolsheandosovsky Selsoviet of Pilninsky District
- Zarya, Voznesensky District, Nizhny Novgorod Oblast, a settlement in Naryshkinsky Selsoviet of Voznesensky District

== Novgorod Oblast ==
As of 2010, one rural locality in Novgorod Oblast bears this name:

- Zarya, Novgorod Oblast, a village in Zhirkovskoye Settlement of Demyansky District

== Orenburg Oblast ==
As of 2010, one rural locality in Orenburg Oblast bears this name:

- Zarya, Orenburg Oblast, a settlement in Novoashirovsky Selsoviet of Matveyevsky District

== Oryol Oblast ==
As of 2010, three rural localities in Oryol Oblast bear this name:

- Zarya, Orlovsky District, Oryol Oblast, a settlement in Stanovo-Kolodezsky Selsoviet of Orlovsky District
- Zarya, Sverdlovsky District, Oryol Oblast, a village in Bogodukhovsky Selsoviet of Sverdlovsky District
- Zarya, Zalegoshchensky District, Oryol Oblast, a settlement in Mokhovsky Selsoviet of Zalegoshchensky District

== Rostov Oblast ==
As of 2010, one rural locality in Rostov Oblast bears this name:

- Zarya, Rostov Oblast, a khutor in Rogovskoye Rural Settlement of Yegorlyksky District

== Ryazan Oblast ==
As of 2010, four rural localities in Ryazan Oblast bear this name:

- Zarya, Mikhaylovsky District, Ryazan Oblast, a settlement in Gornostayevsky Rural Okrug of Mikhaylovsky District
- Zarya, Alexandro-Nevsky District, Ryazan Oblast, a settlement in Speshnevsky Rural Okrug of Alexandro-Nevsky District
- Zarya, Sarayevsky District, Ryazan Oblast, a settlement in Alexeyevsky Rural Okrug of Sarayevsky District
- Zarya, Shatsky District, Ryazan Oblast, a settlement in Bolsheagishevsky Rural Okrug of Shatsky District

== Sakha Republic ==
As of 2010, one rural locality in the Sakha Republic bears this name:

- Zarya, Sakha Republic, a selo in Chuoninsky Rural Okrug of Mirninsky District

== Samara Oblast ==
As of 2010, two rural localities in Samara Oblast bear this name:

- Zarya (Staraya Binaradka Rural Settlement), Krasnoyarsky District, Samara Oblast, a settlement in Krasnoyarsky District; municipally, a part of Staraya Binaradka Rural Settlement of that district
- Zarya (Kommunarsky Rural Settlement), Krasnoyarsky District, Samara Oblast, a settlement in Krasnoyarsky District; municipally, a part of Kommunarsky Rural Settlement of that district

== Saratov Oblast ==
As of 2010, one rural locality in Saratov Oblast bears this name:

- Zarya, Saratov Oblast, a selo in Marksovsky District

== Smolensk Oblast ==
As of 2010, two rural localities in Smolensk Oblast bear this name:

- Zarya, Roslavlsky District, Smolensk Oblast, a village in Zharynskoye Rural Settlement of Roslavlsky District
- Zarya, Ugransky District, Smolensk Oblast, a village in Vskhodskoye Rural Settlement of Ugransky District

== Stavropol Krai ==
As of 2010, one rural locality in Stavropol Krai bears this name:

- Zarya, Stavropol Krai, a settlement in Zarinsky Selsoviet of Levokumsky District

== Sverdlovsk Oblast ==
As of 2010, two rural localities in Sverdlovsk Oblast bear this name:

- Zarya, Achitsky District, Sverdlovsk Oblast, a settlement in Achitsky District
- Zarya, Alapayevsky District, Sverdlovsk Oblast, a settlement in Alapayevsky District

== Tambov Oblast ==
As of 2010, one rural locality in Tambov Oblast bears this name:

- Zarya, Tambov Oblast, a settlement in Stolovsky Selsoviet of Tambovsky District

== Republic of Tatarstan ==
As of 2010, one rural locality in the Republic of Tatarstan bears this name:

- Zarya, Republic of Tatarstan, a settlement in Aksubayevsky District

== Tula Oblast ==
As of 2010, two rural localities in Tula Oblast bear this name:

- Zarya, Shchyokinsky District, Tula Oblast, a settlement in Lazarevskaya Rural Administration of Shchyokinsky District
- Zarya, Yefremovsky District, Tula Oblast, a settlement in Tormasovsky Rural Okrug of Yefremovsky District

== Tver Oblast ==
As of 2010, three rural localities in Tver Oblast bear this name:

- Zarya, Rameshkovsky District, Tver Oblast, a village in Zastolbye Rural Settlement of Rameshkovsky District
- Zarya, Selizharovsky District, Tver Oblast, a village in Bolshekoshinskoye Rural Settlement of Selizharovsky District
- Zarya, Torzhoksky District, Tver Oblast, a village in Strashevichskoye Rural Settlement of Torzhoksky District

== Udmurt Republic ==
As of 2010, two rural localities in the Udmurt Republic bear this name:

- Zarya, Vavozhsky District, Udmurt Republic, a village in Bryzgalovsky Selsoviet of Vavozhsky District
- Zarya, Yakshur-Bodyinsky District, Udmurt Republic, a selo in Chernushinsky Selsoviet of Yakshur-Bodyinsky District

== Vladimir Oblast ==
As of 2010, one rural locality in Vladimir Oblast bears this name:

- Zarya, Vladimir Oblast, a village in Kovrovsky District

== Volgograd Oblast ==
As of 2010, two rural localities in Volgograd Oblast bear this name:

- Zarya, Kalachyovsky District, Volgograd Oblast, a settlement in Zaryansky Selsoviet of Kalachyovsky District
- Zarya, Leninsky District, Volgograd Oblast, a settlement in Stepnovsky Selsoviet of Leninsky District

== Vologda Oblast ==
As of 2010, one rural locality in Vologda Oblast bears this name:

- Zarya, Vologda Oblast, a settlement in Goncharovsky Selsoviet of Vologodsky District

== Voronezh Oblast ==
As of 2010, two rural localities in Voronezh Oblast bear this name:

- Zarya, Bobrovsky District, Voronezh Oblast, a khutor in Slobodskoye Rural Settlement of Bobrovsky District
- Zarya, Novokhopyorsky District, Voronezh Oblast, a settlement in Kolenovskoye Rural Settlement of Novokhopyorsky District

== Yaroslavl Oblast ==
As of 2010, two rural localities in Yaroslavl Oblast bear this name:

- Zarya, Gavrilov-Yamsky District, Yaroslavl Oblast, a settlement in Stavotinsky Rural Okrug of Gavrilov-Yamsky District
- Zarya, Myshkinsky District, Yaroslavl Oblast, a settlement in Zarubinsky Rural Okrug of Myshkinsky District

== Zabaykalsky Krai ==
As of 2010, one rural locality in Zabaykalsky Krai bears this name:

- Zarya, Zabaykalsky Krai, a selo in Olovyanninsky District
