= Arteushka =

Arteushka Артеушка
- Settlement
- Location within Zabaykalsky Krai Location within Russia
- Coordinates: 53°46′N 119°17′E
- Country: Russia
- Region: Zabaykalsky Krai
- District: Mogochinsky District
- Time zone: UTC+9:00

Arteushka (Russian: Артеушка) is a rural locality (a settlement) in Mogochinsky District, Zabaykalsky Krai, Russia. Population: 75 (2021 census); 94 (2010 census); There is 1 street in this settlement.

== Geography ==
This rural locality is located 32 km from Mogocha (the district's administrative centre), 427 km from Chita (capital of Zabaykalsky Krai) and 5,371 km from Moscow. Chaldonka is the nearest rural locality.
