= Kendagiry =

Kendagiry Кендагиры
- Settlement
- Location within Zabaykalsky Krai Location within Russia
- Coordinates: 53°27′N 118°32′E
- Country: Russia
- Region: Zabaykalsky Krai
- District: Mogochinsky District
- Time zone: UTC+9:00

Kendagiry (Russian: Кендагиры) is a rural locality (a settlement) in Mogochinsky District, Zabaykalsky Krai, Russia. Population: 36 (2021 census); 41 (2010 census); 69 (2002 census); There is 1 street in this settlement.

== Geography ==
This rural locality is located 87 km from Mogocha (the district's administrative centre), 369 km from Chita (capital of Zabaykalsky Krai) and 5,364 km from Moscow. Tyomnaya is the nearest rural locality.
