= Pankrushikha =

Pankrushikha (Russian: Панкрушиха) is the name of two rural localities in Pankrushikhinsky District of Altai Krai, Russia:

- Pankrushikha, Pankrushikhinsky Selsoviet, Pankrushikhinsky District, Altai Krai, a selo in Pankrushikhinsky Selsoviet
- Pankrushikha, Zheleznodorozhny Selsoviet, Pankrushikhinsky District, Altai Krai, a station in Zheleznodorozhny Selsoviet
