= Malokovali =

Malokovali Малоковали
- Settlement
- Location within Zabaykalsky Krai Location within Russia
- Coordinates: 54°06′N 121°32′E
- Country: Russia
- Region: Zabaykalsky Krai
- District: Mogochinsky District
- Time zone: UTC+9:00

Malokovali (Russian: Малоковали) is a rural locality (a settlement) in Mogochinsky District, Zabaykalsky Krai, Russia. Population: 22 (2021 census); 28 (2010 census); 41 (2002 census);

== Geography ==
This rural locality is located 123 km from Mogocha (the district's administrative centre), 573 km from Chita (capital of Zabaykalsky Krai) and 5,474 km from Moscow. Uteni is the nearest rural locality.
