= Semiozyorny =

Semiozyorny Семиозёрный
- Settlement
- Location within Zabaykalsky Krai Location within Russia
- Coordinates: 53°42′N 120°22′E
- Country: Russia
- Region: Zabaykalsky Krai
- District: Mogochinsky District
- Time zone: UTC+9:00

Semiozyorny (Russian: Семиозёрный) is a rural locality (a settlement) in Mogochinsky District, Zabaykalsky Krai, Russia. Population: 909 (2021 census); 1,010 (2010 census); 969 (2002 census); There are 16 streets in this settlement.

== Geography ==
This rural locality is located 40 km from Mogocha (the district's administrative centre), 489 km from Chita (capital of Zabaykalsky Krai) and 5,451 km from Moscow. Chador is the nearest rural locality.
