= Chaldonka =

Chaldonka Чалдонка
- Selo
- Location within Zabaykalsky Krai Location within Russia
- Coordinates: 53°46′N 119°13′E
- Country: Russia
- Region: Zabaykalsky Krai
- District: Mogochinsky District
- Time zone: UTC+9:00

Chaldonka (Russian: Чалдонка) is a rural locality (a selo) in Mogochinsky District, Zabaykalsky Krai, Russia. Population: 226 (2021 census); 284 (2010 census); 345 (2002 census); There are 6 streets in this selo.

== Geography ==
This rural locality is located 36 km from Mogocha (the district's administrative centre), 423 km from Chita (capital of Zabaykalsky Krai) and 5,366 km from Moscow. Arteushka is the nearest rural locality.
