= Anikino, Zabaykalsky Krai =

Anikino Аникино
- Selo
- Location within Zabaykalsky Krai Location within Russia
- Coordinates: 53°26′N 120°19′E
- Country: Russia
- Region: Zabaykalsky Krai
- District: Mogochinsky District
- Time zone: UTC+9:00

Anikino (Russian: Аникино) is a rural locality (a selo) in Mogochinsky District, Zabaykalsky Krai, Russia. Population: 6 (2021 census); 2 (2010 census);

== Geography ==
This rural locality is located 50 km from Mogocha (the district's administrative centre), 479 km from Chita (capital of Zabaykalsky Krai) and 5,485 km from Moscow. Chasovinka is the nearest rural locality.
