= Beregovoye =

Beregovoye Береговое
- Selo
- Location within Altai Krai Location within Russia
- Coordinates: 53°45′N 80°07′E
- Country: Russia
- Region: Altai Krai
- District: Pankrushikhinsky District
- Time zone: UTC+7:00

Beregovoye (Russian: Береговое) is a rural locality (a selo) in Krivinsky Selsoviet, Pankrushikhinsky District, Altai Krai, Russia. The population was 283 as of 2013. There are 4 streets.

== Geography ==
Beregovoye is located 17 km southwest of Pankrushikha (the district's administrative centre) by road. Beryozovsky is the nearest rural locality.
