= Chasovaya =

Chasovaya Часовая
- Selo
- Location within Zabaykalsky Krai Location within Russia
- Coordinates: 53°24′N 119°58′E
- Country: Russia
- Region: Zabaykalsky Krai
- District: Mogochinsky District
- Time zone: UTC+9:00

Chasovaya (Russian: Часовая) is a rural locality (a selo) in Mogochinsky District, Zabaykalsky Krai, Russia. Population: 5 (2021 census); 4 (2010 census); There are 2 streets in this selo.

== Geography ==
This rural locality is located 38 km from Mogocha (the district's administrative centre), 455 km from Chita (capital of Zabaykalsky Krai) and 5,464 km from Moscow. Chasovinka is the nearest rural locality.
