= Kisly Klyuch, Zabaykalsky Krai =

Kisly Klyuch Кислый Ключ
- Settlement
- Location within Zabaykalsky Krai Location within Russia
- Coordinates: 53°42′N 119°07′E
- Country: Russia
- Region: Zabaykalsky Krai
- District: Mogochinsky District
- Time zone: UTC+9:00

Kisly Klyuch (Russian: Кислый Ключ) is a rural locality (a settlement) in Mogochinsky District, Zabaykalsky Krai, Russia. Population: 27 (2021 census); 46 (2010 census); 75 (2002 census); There is 1 street in this settlement.

== Geography ==
This rural locality is located 42 km from Mogocha (the district's administrative centre), 415 km from Chita (capital of Zabaykalsky Krai) and 5,370 km from Moscow. Chaldonka is the nearest rural locality.
