= Zhanna, Zabaykalsky Krai =

Zhanna Жанна
- Settlement
- Location within Zabaykalsky Krai Location within Russia
- Coordinates: 54°03′N 121°24′E
- Country: Russia
- Region: Zabaykalsky Krai
- District: Mogochinsky District
- Time zone: UTC+9:00

Zhanna (Russian: Жанна) is a rural locality (a settlement) in Mogochinsky District, Zabaykalsky Krai, Russia. Population: 37 (2021 census); 93 (2010 census); 95 (2002 census); There is 1 street in this settlement.

== Geography ==
This rural locality is located 113 km from Mogocha (the district's administrative centre), 563 km from Chita (capital of Zabaykalsky Krai) and 5,473 km from Moscow. Chichatka is the nearest rural locality.
