= Berezovsky, Pankrushikhinsky District, Altai Krai =

Berezovsky Берёзовский
- Settlement
- Location within Altai Krai Location within Russia
- Coordinates: 53°44′N 80°15′E
- Country: Russia
- Region: Altai Krai
- District: Pankrushikhinsky District
- Time zone: UTC+7:00

Berezovsky (Russian: Берёзовский) is a rural locality (a settlement) and the administrative center of Zheleznodorzhny Selsoviet, Pankrushikhinsky District, Altai Krai, Russia. The population was 400 as of 2013. There are 8 streets.

== Geography ==
Berezovsky is located 17 km southwest of Pankrushikha (the district's administrative centre) by road. Beregovoye is the nearest rural locality.
