= Tyomnaya, Zabaykalsky Krai =

Tyomnaya Тёмная
- Settlement
- Location within Zabaykalsky Krai Location within Russia
- Coordinates: 53°23′N 118°30′E
- Country: Russia
- Region: Zabaykalsky Krai
- District: Mogochinsky District
- Time zone: UTC+9:00

Tyomnaya (Russian: Тёмная) is a rural locality (a settlement) in Mogochinsky District, Zabaykalsky Krai, Russia. Population: 32 (2021 census); 49 (2010 census); 66 (2002 census); There are 3 streets in this settlement.

== Geography ==
This rural locality is located 91 km from Mogocha (the district's administrative centre), 365 km from Chita (capital of Zabaykalsky Krai) and 5,370 km from Moscow. Kendagiry is the nearest rural locality.
