= Chichatka =

Chichatka Чичатка
- Settlement
- Location within Zabaykalsky Krai Location within Russia
- Coordinates: 54°02′N 121°17′E
- Country: Russia
- Region: Zabaykalsky Krai
- District: Mogochinsky District
- Time zone: UTC+9:00

Chichatka (Russian: Чичатка) is a rural locality (a settlement) in Mogochinsky District, Zabaykalsky Krai, Russia. Population: 10 (2021 census); 14 (2010 census); 21 (2002 census);

== Geography ==
This rural locality is located 106 km from Mogocha (the district's administrative centre), 556 km from Chita (capital of Zabaykalsky Krai) and 5,467 km from Moscow. Zhanna is the nearest rural locality.
