= Mogochinsky =

Mogochinsky (masculine), Mogochinskaya (feminine), or Mogochinskoye (neuter) may refer to:

- Mogochinsky District, a district of Zabaykalsky Krai, Russia
- Mogochinskoye Urban Settlement, a municipal formation which the town of Mogocha and four rural localities in Mogochinsky District of Zabaykalsky Krai, Russia are incorporated as
