= Golets Kropotkin =

Mountain in Russia

- Голец Кропоткина
- Location within Zabaykalsky Krai

Highest point
- Elevation: 1,908 m (6,260 ft)
- Prominence: 850 m (2,790 ft)
- Coordinates: 53°43′39″N 117°33′29″E

Geography
- Location: Zabaykalsky Krai, Russian Far East
- Parent range: Muroy Range, Olyokma-Stanovik

Golets Kropotkin (Russian: Голец Кропоткина) is a peak in the Olyokma-Stanovik Mountains. Administratively it is part of Zabaykalsky Krai, Russian Federation. The peak was named after Peter Kropotkin, who had explored the area in 1864.

This emblematic summit was declared a natural monument by the Chita Regional Executive Committee order No. 353 on 14 July 1983.

== Geography ==
This 1,908 m (6,260 ft) high mountain is the highest point of the Olyokma-Stanovik, part of the South Siberian System of ranges. It is located in the western part of the highland area, on the border of Tungokochensky District to the west and Tungiro-Olyokminsky District to the east.

Golets Kropotkin is a ‘’golets’’-type of mountain with a bald peak belonging to the Muroy Range, one of the subranges of the Olyokma-Stanovik mountain system.

== Flora ==
The peak has well-defined altitudinal vegetation zones, with mountain taiga in the lower slopes, followed by pre-alpine woodland and an alpine belt further up. Some of the plants found on the southern sides include Erman's birch, golden rhododendron, Cassiope, alpine bearberry and golden dock, among others.

== See also ==
- List of mountains in Russia
- Kropotkin Range
