= Srednyaya Olyokma =

Srednyaya Olyokma Средняя Олёкма
- Selo
- Location within Zabaykalsky Krai Location within Russia
- Coordinates: 55°25′N 120°32′E
- Country: Russia
- Region: Zabaykalsky Krai
- District: Tungiro-Olyokminsky District
- Time zone: UTC+9:00

Srednyaya Olyokma (Russian: Средняя Олёкма) is a rural locality (a selo) in Tungiro-Olyokminsky District, Zabaykalsky Krai, Russia. Population: 54 (2021 census); 84 (2010 census); 138 (2002 census); There are 3 streets in this selo.

== Geography ==
This rural locality is located 117 km from Tupik (the district's administrative centre), 583 km from Chita (capital of Zabaykalsky Krai) and 5,233 km from Moscow.
