= Zarechny, Pankrushikhinsky District, Altai Krai =

Zarechny Заречный
- Settlement
- Location within Altai Krai Location within Russia
- Coordinates: 53°48′N 80°26′E
- Country: Russia
- Region: Altai Krai
- District: Pankrushikhinsky District
- Time zone: UTC+7:00

Zarechny (Russian: Заречный) is a rural locality (a settlement) in Pankrushikhinsky Selsoviet, Pankrushikhinsky District, Altai Krai, Russia. The population was 107 as of 2013. There is 1 street.

== Geography ==
Zarechny is located 8 km southeast of Pankrushikha (the district's administrative centre) by road. Pankrushikha is the nearest rural locality.
