= Tungir =

River in East Siberia

Tungir Shiroky Brook
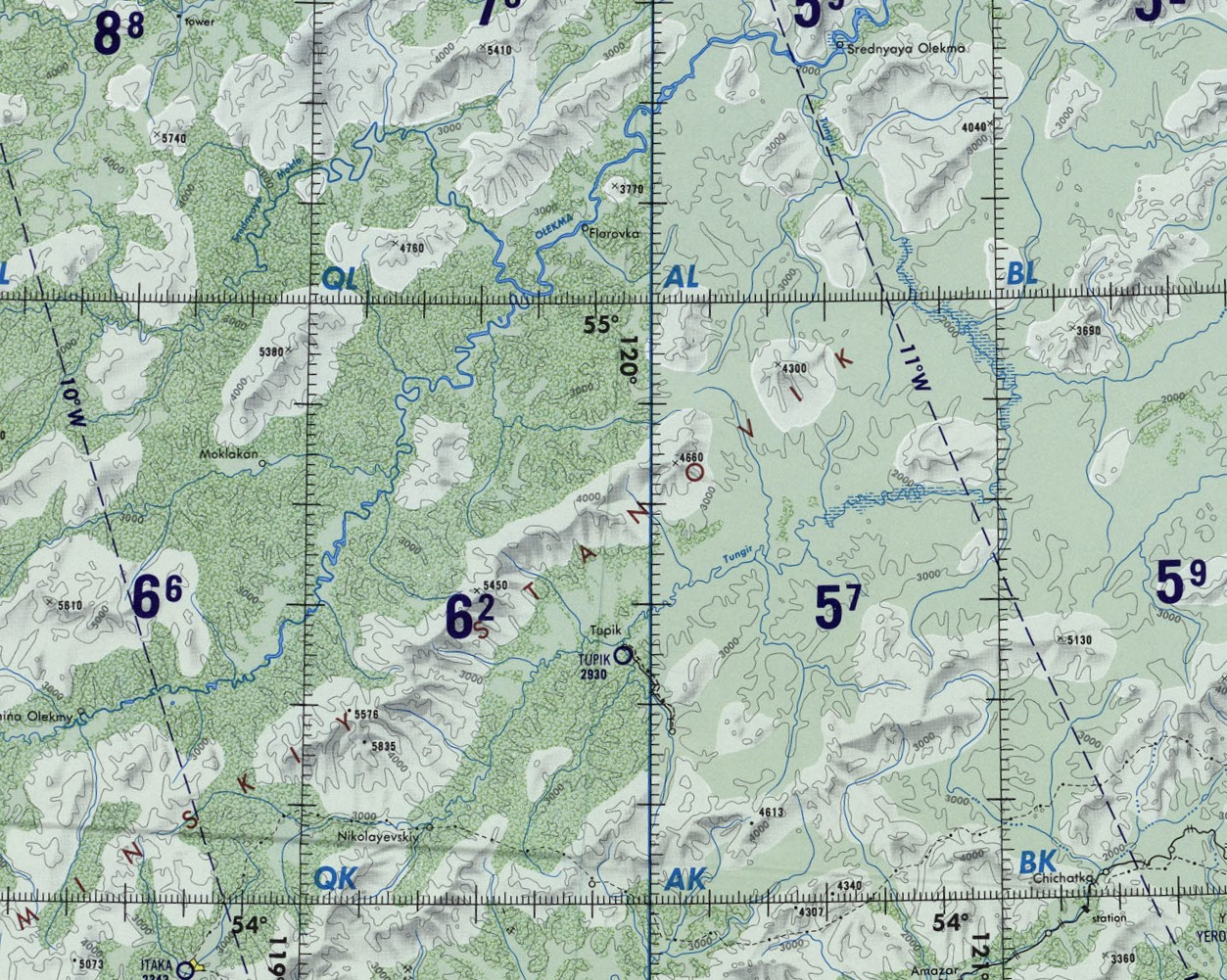
- Course of the Tungir

- Mouth location in Transbaikalia, Russia

Location
- Country: Russia
- Federal subject: Zabaykalsky Krai

Physical characteristics
- Source: Tungir Range; Olyokma-Stanovik Highlands
  - coordinates: 54°06′56″N 118°34′40″E
  - elevation: 1,200 m (3,900 ft)
- Mouth: Olyokma
  - location: Near Srednyaya Olyokma
  - coordinates: 55°24′45″N 120°33′50″E
  - elevation: 501 m (1,644 ft)
- Length: 500 km (310 mi)
- Basin size: 14,700 km^{2} (5,700 sq mi)
- Discharge
  - average: 90 m^{3}/s (3,200 cu ft/s)

Basin features
- Progression: Olyokma→ Lena→ Laptev Sea

The Tungir (Russian: Тунгир) is a river in Transbaikalia, East Siberia, Russian Federation. It is the third largest tributary of the Olyokma in terms of length and area of its basin. The river is 500 kilometres (310 mi) long and has a drainage basin of 14,700 square kilometres (5,700 sq mi). The Tungir is known as the Shiroky Brook (ручей Широкий) in its uppermost stretch. Almost all of its basin is in the Olyokma-Stanovik Highlands area.

The river is a destination for rafting and tourism. There are two settlements by the river, Tupik and Gulya.

== History ==
Yerofey Khabarov used this river's route to travel with his Cossacks from the Lena to the Amur during his mid-17th century expeditions. In the spring of 1649 Khabarov set off at his own expense up the Olyokma, then up the Tungir and portaged to the Shilka, reaching the upper Amur (Dauria) in early 1650. Khabarov founded the village of Srednyaya Olyokma, located at the confluence of the Olyokma and the Tungir.

== Course ==
The Tungir is a right tributary of the Olyokma, of the Lena basin. Its source is in Zabaykalsky Krai, in the northeastern slopes of the Tungir Range of the Olyokma-Stanovik Highlands. It flows roughly northeastwards with the Tungir Range on the northwestern side and the Gula Range on the southeastern. In the area of the confluence with the Cheryomnaya it forms the famous rapids of the Magyarskiy Perekat. Further downstream, after the confluence with the Bugarikhta, the river flows into a narrow valley in a NNW direction and its speed increases, then after Gulya it slows down along a wide intermontane basin. Finally it meets the right bank of the Olyokma 905 km (562 mi) from its mouth in the Lena, near the village of Srednyaya Olyokma.

Its main tributaries are the 74 km (46 mi) long Tungirikan, the 125 km (78 mi) long Nenyuga, the 78 km (48 mi) long Cheremnaya (Черемная) and the 78 km (48 mi) long Bugarikhta from the right, and the 73 km (45 mi) long Upper Korsuga from the left. The river freezes towards the end of October and stays under ice until late April or early May. Some years the river may cause catastrophic summer floods caused by rain.

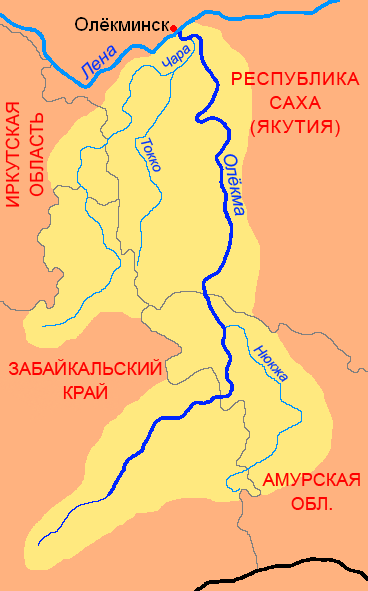
Olyokma basin.

== See also ==
- List of rivers of Russia
- Tungiro-Olyokminsky District
