= Zarya, Pankrushikhinsky District, Altai Krai =

Zarya Заря
- Settlement
- Location within Altai Krai Location within Russia
- Coordinates: 53°45′N 79°53′E
- Country: Russia
- Region: Altai Krai
- District: Pankrushikhinsky District
- Time zone: UTC+7:00

Zarya (Russian: Заря) is a rural locality (a settlement) in Uryvayevsky Selsoviet, Pankrushikhinsky District, Altai Krai, Russia. The population was 38 as of 2013. There is 1 street.

== Geography ==
Zarya is located 45 km west of Pankrushikha (the district's administrative centre) by road. Uryvayevo is the nearest rural locality.
