= Zarechnoye, Zabaykalsky Krai =

Zarechnoye Заречное
- Selo
- Location within Zabaykalsky Krai Location within Russia
- Coordinates: 54°27′N 119°55′E
- Country: Russia
- Region: Zabaykalsky Krai
- District: Tungiro-Olyokminsky District
- Time zone: UTC+9:00

Zarechnoye (Russian: Заречное) is a rural locality (a selo) in Tungiro-Olyokminsky District, Zabaykalsky Krai, Russia. Population: 208 (2021 census); 271 (2010 census); 302 (2002 census); There are 7 streets in this selo.

== Geography ==
This rural locality is located 4 km from Tupik (the district's administrative centre), 496 km from Chita (capital of Zabaykalsky Krai) and 5,322 km from Moscow. Tupik is the nearest rural locality.
