= Maxim Gorky, Arkhangelsky District, Republic of Bashkortostan =

Maxim Gorky Максим Горький
- Village
- Location within Bashkortostan Location within Russia
- Coordinates: 54°17′N 56°47′E
- Country: Russia
- Region: Bashkortostan
- District: Arkhangelsky District
- Time zone: UTC+5:00

Maxim Gorky (Russian: Максим Горький) is a rural locality (a village) in Arkh-Latyshsky Selsoviet, Arkhangelsky District, Bashkortostan, Russia. The population was 802 as of 2010. There are 24 streets.

== Geography ==
Maxim Gorky is located 14 km south of Arkhangelskoye (the district's administrative centre) by road. Zarya is the nearest rural locality.
