= Gulya =

Gulya Гуля
- Settlement
- Location within Zabaykalsky Krai
- Coordinates: 54°40′18″N 120°59′47″E
- Country: Russia
- Region: Zabaykalsky Krai
- District: Tungiro-Olyokminsky District
- Time zone: UTC+9:00

Gulya (Russian: Гуля) is a rural locality (a settlement) in the inter-settlement area of Tungiro-Olyokminsky District, Zabaykalsky Krai, Russia. The population was 26 as of 2021, mainly Evenks and Russians. The area is under the risk of forest fires.

== Geography ==
It is located in the Olyokma-Stanovik, on the confluence of the Gulya River and the Tungir on the right bank.
