= Zarechny, Vladimir Oblast =

Zarechny Заречный
- Settlement
- Location within Vladimir Oblast Location within Russia
- Coordinates: 56°21′N 41°56′E
- Country: Russia
- Region: Vladimir Oblast
- District: Vyaznikovsky District
- Time zone: UTC+3:00

Zarechny (Russian: Заречный) is a rural locality (a settlement) in Mstyora Urban Settlement, Vyaznikovsky District, Vladimir Oblast, Russia. The population was 321 as of 2010.

== Geography ==
Zarechny is located on the Tara River, 22 km northwest of Vyazniki (the district's administrative centre) by road. Slobodka is the nearest rural locality.
