= Zarechnaya (Yugo-Kamskoye Rural Settlement), Permsky District, Perm Krai =

Zarechnaya Заречная
- Village
- Location within Perm Krai Location within Russia
- Coordinates: 57°33′N 55°51′E
- Country: Russia
- Region: Perm Krai
- District: Permsky District
- Time zone: UTC+5:00

Zarechnaya (Russian: Заречная) is a rural locality (a village) in Yugo-Kamskoye Rural Settlement, Permsky District, Perm Krai, Russia. The population was 14 as of 2010.

== Geography ==
It is located 21 km south-east from Yugo-Kamsky.
