= Zarechnoye, Vladimir Oblast =

Zarechnoye Заречное
- Selo
- Location within Vladimir Oblast Location within Russia
- Coordinates: 55°56′N 39°55′E
- Country: Russia
- Region: Vladimir Oblast
- District: Sobinsky District
- Time zone: UTC+3:00

Zarechnoye (Russian: Заречное) is a rural locality (a selo) and the administrative center of Kopninskoye Rural Settlement, Sobinsky District, Vladimir Oblast, Russia. The population was 1,165 as of 2010. There are 5 streets.

== Geography ==
Zarechnoye is located 17 km southwest of Sobinka (the district's administrative centre) by road. Mitrofanka is the nearest rural locality.
