= Zarya, Zabaykalsky Krai =

Zarya Заря
- Selo
- Location within Zabaykalsky Krai Location within Russia
- Coordinates: 51°08′N 116°03′E
- Country: Russia
- Region: Zabaykalsky Krai
- District: Olovyanninsky District
- Time zone: UTC+9:00

Zarya (Russian: Заря) is a rural locality (a selo) in Olovyanninsky District, Zabaykalsky Krai, Russia. Population: 61 (2021 census); 76 (2010 census); 129 (2002 census); There are 3 streets in this selo.

== Geography ==
This rural locality is located 41 km from Olovyannaya (the district's administrative centre), 204 km from Chita (capital of Zabaykalsky Krai) and 5,496 km from Moscow. Yedineniye is the nearest rural locality.
