= Zarechny, Ivanovo Oblast =

Zarechny Заречный
- Selo
- Location within Ivanovo Oblast Location within Russia
- Coordinates: 57°28′N 42°16′E
- Country: Russia
- Region: Ivanovo Oblast
- District: Zavolzhsky District
- Time zone: UTC+3:00

Zarechny (Russian: Заречный) is a rural locality (a selo) in Zavolzhsky District, Ivanovo Oblast, Russia. Population: 1,192 (2010 census); 1,382 (2002 census);

== Geography ==
This rural locality is located 9 km from Zavolzhsk (the district's administrative centre), 95 km from Ivanovo (capital of Ivanovo Oblast) and 338 km from Moscow. Pyreshevo is the nearest rural locality.
