= Zarechnaya (Gamovskoye Rural Settlement), Permsky District, Perm Krai =

Zarechnaya Заречная
- Village
- Location within Perm Krai Location within Russia
- Coordinates: 57°51′N 56°03′E
- Country: Russia
- Region: Perm Krai
- District: Permsky District
- Time zone: UTC+5:00

Zarechnaya (Russian: Заречная) is a village in Gamovskoye Rural Settlement, Permsky District, Perm Krai, Russia. The population was 75 as of 2010.

== Geography ==
It is located 3 km west from Gamovo.
