= Zarechnoye, Astrakhan Oblast =

Zarechnoye Заречное
- Selo
- Location within Astrakhan Oblast Location within Russia
- Coordinates: 45°52′N 47°27′E
- Country: Russia
- Region: Astrakhan Oblast
- District: Limansky District
- Time zone: UTC+4:00

Zarechnoye (Russian: Заречное) is a rural locality (a selo) and the administrative center of Novogeorgiyevsky Selsoviet, Limansky District, Astrakhan Oblast, Russia. The population was 1,325 as of 2010. There are 3 streets.

== Geography ==
Zarechnoye is located 24 km northeast of Liman (the district's administrative centre) by road. Novogeorgiyevsk is the nearest rural locality.
