= Zarya, Davlekanovsky District, Republic of Bashkortostan =

Zarya Заря
- Village
- Location within Bashkortostan Location within Russia
- Coordinates: 54°08′N 55°19′E
- Country: Russia
- Region: Bashkortostan
- District: Davlekanovsky District
- Time zone: UTC+5:00

Zarya (Russian: Заря) is a rural locality (a village) in Bik-Karmalinsky Selsoviet, Davlekanovsky District, Bashkortostan, Russia. The population was 65 as of 2010. There are 2 streets.

== Geography ==
Zarya is located 24 km southeast of Davlekanovo (the district's administrative centre) by road. Bik-Karmaly is the nearest rural locality.
