= Zarechny, Zabaykalsky Krai =

Zarechny Заречный
- Settlement
- Location within Zabaykalsky Krai Location within Russia
- Coordinates: 52°01′N 116°30′E
- Country: Russia
- Region: Zabaykalsky Krai
- District: Nerchinsky District
- Time zone: UTC+9:00

Zarechny (Russian: Заречный) is a rural locality (a settlement) in Nerchinsky District, Zabaykalsky Krai, Russia. Population: 899 (2021 census); 969 (2010 census); 995 (2002 census); There are 12 streets in this settlement.

== Geography ==
This rural locality is located 9 km from Nerchinsk (the district's administrative centre), 206 km from Chita (capital of Zabaykalsky Krai) and 5,413 km from Moscow. Nagorny is the nearest rural locality.
