= Zarechnoye, Altai Krai =

Zarechnoye Заречное
- Selo
- Location within Altai Krai Location within Russia
- Coordinates: 53°35′N 85°19′E
- Country: Russia
- Region: Altai Krai
- District: Kytmanovsky District
- Time zone: UTC+7:00

Zarechnoye (Russian: Заречное) is a rural locality (a selo) in Tyagunsky Selsoviet, Kytmanovsky District, Altai Krai, Russia. The population was 224 as of 2013. There are 9 streets.

== Geography ==
Zarechnoye is located on the Chumysh River, 20 km north of Kytmanovo (the district's administrative centre) by road. Dmitro-Titovo is the nearest rural locality.
