= Zarechnoye, Republic of Dagestan =

Zarechnoye Заречное
- Selo
- Location within Republic of Dagestan Location within Russia
- Coordinates: 43°45′N 46°34′E
- Country: Russia
- Region: Republic of Dagestan
- District: Kizlyarsky District
- Time zone: UTC+3:00

Zarechnoye (Russian: Заречное) is a rural locality (a selo) in Krasnoarmeysky Selsoviet, Kizlyarsky District, Republic of Dagestan, Russia. The population was 856 as of 2010. There are 6 streets.

== Geography ==
Zarechnoye is located 19 km southwest of Kizlyar (the district's administrative centre) by road. Dubovskaya and Borozdinovskaya are the nearest rural localities.

== Nationalities ==
Avars, Dargins, Laks, Rutuls, Lezgins and Russians live there.
