= Zarechnoye, Arkharinsky District, Amur Oblast =

Zarechnoye Заречное
- Village
- Location within Amur Oblast Location within Russia
- Coordinates: 49°23′N 130°14′E
- Country: Russia
- Region: Amur Oblast
- District: Arkharinsky District
- Time zone: UTC+9:00

Zarechnoye (Russian: Заречное) is a rural locality (a selo) in Otvazhensky Selsoviet of Arkharinsky District, Amur Oblast, Russia. The population was 50 in 2018. There are 3 streets. The Selo is near R297 (Route 297)

== Geography ==
Zarechnoye is located 15 km southeast of Arkhara (the district's administrative centre) by road. Arkadyevka is the nearest rural locality.
