= Zarechny, Blagovarsky District, Republic of Bashkortostan =

Zarechny Заречный
- Village
- Location within Bashkortostan Location within Russia
- Coordinates: 54°39′N 54°59′E
- Country: Russia
- Region: Bashkortostan
- District: Blagovarsky District
- Time zone: UTC+5:00

Zarechny (Russian: Заречный) is a rural locality (a village) in Yazykovsky Selsoviet, Blagovarsky District, Bashkortostan, Russia. The population was 106 as of 2010. There is 1 street.

== Geography ==
Zarechny is located 4 km southwest of Yazykovo (the district's administrative centre) by road. Yazykovo is the nearest rural locality.
