= Zarechny, Amur Oblast =

Zarechny Заречный
- Settlement
- Location within Amur Oblast Location within Russia
- Coordinates: 50°14′N 127°40′E
- Country: Russia
- Region: Amur Oblast
- District: Blagoveshchensky District
- Time zone: UTC+9:00

Zarechny (Russian: Заречный) is a rural locality (a settlement) in Grodekovsky Selsoviet of Blagoveshchensky District, Amur Oblast, Russia. The population was 151 as of 2018. There are 8 streets.

== Geography ==
Zarechny is located 19 km east of Blagoveshchensk (the district's administrative centre) by road. Zazeysky is the nearest rural locality.
