= Tupik, Zabaykalsky Krai =

Tupik Тупик
- Settlement
- Location within Zabaykalsky Krai
- Coordinates: 54°25′33″N 119°56′14″E
- Country: Russia
- Region: Zabaykalsky Krai
- District: Tungiro-Olyokminsky District
- Time zone: UTC+9:00

Tupik (Russian: Тупик) is a rural locality (a selo) and the administrative center of Tungiro-Olyokminsky District of Zabaykalsky Krai, Russia. Population: 971 (2010 census); 1,041 (2002 census); 1,069 (1989 Soviet census).

== Geography ==
Tupik is located in the Olyokma-Stanovik, 100 kilometers (62 mi) north of Mogocha, on the Tungir river, a tributary of the Olyokma.

== History ==
It was founded in 1911 as a result of an unsuccessful attempt of paving the road to Yakutsk. The project was frozen because of the outbreak of World War I, which is how the village got its name (literally meaning cul-de-sac).

During the war, many POWs were sent here. In April 1919, a partisan group of internationalists, mainly Hungarians, was exterminated by the Japanese expeditionary corps and ataman Grigory Semyonov's troops (the Jewish regiment).

In 1938, Tupik was chosen to be the administrative center of Tungiro-Olyokminsky District. Russians, Ukrainians, and Evenks are three main ethnic groups in Tupik.
