= Zarya, Leninsky District, Volgograd Oblast =

Zarya Заря
- Settlement
- Location within Volgograd Oblast Location within Russia
- Coordinates: 48°48′N 45°32′E
- Country: Russia
- Region: Volgograd Oblast
- District: Leninsky District
- Time zone: UTC+4:00

Zarya (Russian: Заря) is a rural locality (a settlement) in Stepnovskoye Rural Settlement, Leninsky District, Volgograd Oblast, Russia. The population was 142 as of 2010. There are 4 streets.

== Geography ==
The village is located on Caspian Depression, 87 km from Volgograd, 30 km from Leninsk, 15 km from Stepnoy.
