= Zarya, Vladimir Oblast =

Zarya Заря
- Village
- Location within Vladimir Oblast Location within Russia
- Coordinates: 56°17′N 41°21′E
- Country: Russia
- Region: Vladimir Oblast
- District: Kovrovsky District
- Time zone: UTC+3:00

Zarya (Russian: Заря) is a rural locality (a village) in Novoselskoye Rural Settlement, Kovrovsky District, Vladimir Oblast, Russia. The population was 1 as of 2010.

== Geography ==
Zarya is located 11 km south of Kovrov (the district's administrative centre) by road. Kovrov-Gruzovoy is the nearest rural locality.
