= Zarechny, Vologda Oblast =

Zarechny Заречный
- Settlement
- Location within Vologda Oblast Location within Russia
- Coordinates: 60°16′N 37°59′E
- Country: Russia
- Region: Vologda Oblast
- District: Vashkinsky District
- Time zone: UTC+3:00

Zarechny (Russian: Заречный) is a rural locality (a settlement) in Lipinoborskoye Rural Settlement, Vashkinsky District, Vologda Oblast, Russia. The population was 478 as of 2002. There are 5 streets.

== Geography ==
Zarechny is located 2 km northeast of Lipin Bor (the district's administrative centre) by road. Lipin Bor is the nearest rural locality.
