= Zarechnoye, Vologda Oblast =

Zarechnoye Заречное
- Village
- Location within Vologda Oblast Location within Russia
- Coordinates: 59°10′N 39°02′E
- Country: Russia
- Region: Vologda Oblast
- District: Sheksninsky District
- Time zone: UTC+3:00

Zarechnoye (Russian: Заречное) is a rural locality (a village) in Domshinskoye Rural Settlement, Sheksninsky District, Vologda Oblast, Russia. The population was 4 as of 2002.

== Geography ==
Zarechnoye is located 39 km east of Sheksna (the district's administrative centre) by road. Volkovo is the nearest rural locality.
