= Zarya, Kalachyovsky District, Volgograd Oblast =

Zarya Заря
- Settlement
- Location within Volgograd Oblast Location within Russia
- Coordinates: 48°32′N 44°07′E
- Country: Russia
- Region: Volgograd Oblast
- District: Kalachyovsky District
- Time zone: UTC+4:00

Zarya (Russian: Заря) is a rural locality (a settlement) and the administrative center of Zaryanskoye Rural Settlement, Kalachyovsky District, Volgograd Oblast, Russia. The population was 664 as of 2010. There are 6 streets.

== Geography ==
Zarya is located on the west bank of the Varvarovskoye Reservoir, 59 km southeast of Kalach-na-Donu (the district's administrative centre) by road. Parkhomenko is the nearest rural locality.
