= Zarechny, Gafuriysky District, Republic of Bashkortostan =

Zarechny Заречный
- Village
- Location within Bashkortostan Location within Russia
- Coordinates: 53°54′N 56°24′E
- Country: Russia
- Region: Bashkortostan
- District: Gafuriysky District
- Time zone: UTC+5:00

Zarechny (Russian: Заречный) is a rural locality (a village) in Krasnoulsky Selsoviet, Gafuriysky District, Bashkortostan, Russia. The population was 78 as of 2010. There are 5 streets.

== Geography ==
Zarechny is located 6 km northwest of Krasnousolsky (the district's administrative centre) by road. Krasnousolsky is the nearest rural locality.
