= Zarya, Vologda Oblast =

Zarya Заря
- Settlement
- Location within Vologda Oblast Location within Russia
- Coordinates: 59°17′N 39°29′E
- Country: Russia
- Region: Vologda Oblast
- District: Vologodsky District
- Time zone: UTC+3:00

Zarya (Russian: Заря) is a rural locality (a settlement) in Mayskoye Rural Settlement, Vologodsky District, Vologda Oblast, Russia. The population was 830 as of 2002. There are 4 streets.

== Geography ==
Zarya is located 27 km northwest of Vologda (the district's administrative centre) by road. Kovylevo is the nearest locality.
