= Zarechnoye, Belogorsky District, Amur Oblast =

Zarechnoye Заречное
- Selo
- Location within Amur Oblast Location within Russia
- Coordinates: 50°37′N 128°37′E
- Country: Russia
- Region: Amur Oblast
- District: Belogorsky District
- Time zone: UTC+9:00

Zarechnoye (Russian: Заречное) is a rural locality (a selo) and the administrative center of Ozeryansky Selsoviet of Belogorsky District, Amur Oblast, Russia. The population was 393 as of 2018. There are 12 streets.

== Geography ==
Zarechnoye is located on the right bank of the Bureya River, 46 km south of Belogorsk (the district's administrative centre) by road. Chernetcheno is the nearest rural locality.
