= Zarya, Biysky District, Altai Krai =

Zarya Заря
- Settlement
- Location within Altai Krai Location within Russia
- Coordinates: 52°35′N 85°10′E
- Country: Russia
- Region: Altai Krai
- District: Biysky District
- Time zone: UTC+7:00

Zarya (Russian: Заря) is a rural locality (a settlement) and the administrative center of Zarinsky Selsoviet, Biysky District, Altai Krai, Russia. The population was 970 as of 2013. There are 9 streets.

== Geography ==
Zarya is located 8 km north of Biysk (the district's administrative centre) by road. Studenchesky is the nearest rural locality.
