= Zarechny, Voronezh Oblast =

Zarechny Заречный
- Settlement
- Location within Voronezh Oblast Location within Russia
- Coordinates: 51°11′N 39°49′E
- Country: Russia
- Region: Voronezh Oblast
- District: Bobrovsky District
- Time zone: UTC+3:00

Zarechny (Russian: Заречный) is a rural locality (a settlement) in Verkhneikoretskoye Rural Settlement, Bobrovsky District, Voronezh Oblast, Russia. The population was 196 as of 2010.
