= Zarya, Arkhangelsky District, Republic of Bashkortostan =

Zarya Заря
- Village
- Location within Bashkortostan Location within Russia
- Coordinates: 54°16′N 56°48′E
- Country: Russia
- Region: Bashkortostan
- District: Arkhangelsky District
- Time zone: UTC+5:00

Zarya (Russian: Заря) is a rural locality (a village) in Arkh-Latyshsky Selsoviet, Arkhangelsky District, Bashkortostan, Russia. The population was 294 as of 2010. There are 10 streets.

== Geography ==
Zarya is located 17 km south of Arkhangelskoye (the district's administrative centre) by road. Maxim Gorky is the nearest rural locality.
