= Tungiro-Olyokminsky District =

Tungiro-Olyokminsky District Тунгиро-Олёкминский район (Russian)
- District
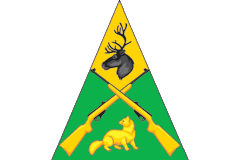
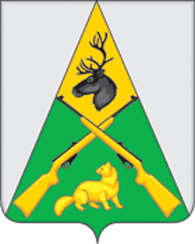
- Flag Coat of arms
- Location of Tungiro-Olyokminsky District in Zabaykalsky Krai
- Coordinates: 54.925°N 119.939°E
- Country: Russia
- Federal subject: Zabaykalsky Krai
- Established: January 6, 1927
- Administrative center: Tupik

Area
  - Total: 42,900 km^{2} (16,600 sq mi)

Population (2010 Census)
  - Total: 1,432
  - Estimate (2018): 1,347 (−5.9%)
  - Density: 0.0334/km^{2} (0.0865/sq mi)
  - Urban: 0%
  - Rural: 100%

Administrative structure
  - Inhabited localities: 5 rural localities

Municipal structure
  - Municipally incorporated as: Tungiro-Olyokminsky Municipal District
  - Municipal divisions: 0 urban settlements, 2 rural settlements
- Time zone: UTC+9 (MSK+6)
- OKTMO ID: 76642000
- Website: http://xn--c1aknogg.xn--80aaaac8algcbgbck3fl0q.xn--p1ai/

Tungiro-Olyokminsky District (Russian: Тунгиро-Олёкминский райо́н) is an administrative and municipal district (raion), one of the thirty-one in Zabaykalsky Krai, Russia. It is located in the northeast of the krai, and borders with Kalarsky District in the north, Mogochinsky District in the south, and with Tungokochensky District in the west. The area of the district is 42,900 square kilometers (16,600 sq mi). Its administrative center is the rural locality (a selo) of Tupik. Population: 1,432 (2010 census); 1,643 (2002 Census); 1,899 (1989 Soviet census). The population of Tupik accounts for 67.8% of the district's total population. Other rural localities include Gulya and Srednyaya Olyokma.

== Geography ==
The district is located in the Olyokma-Stanovik Highlands area. The Olyokma and the Tungir, one of its main tributaries, flow across it.

== History ==
The district was established on January 6, 1927.

== Economy ==
The district is rich with gold, silver, lead, and other natural resources.
