= Olyokma-Stanovik =

Mountain range in Russia

- Олёкминский Становик
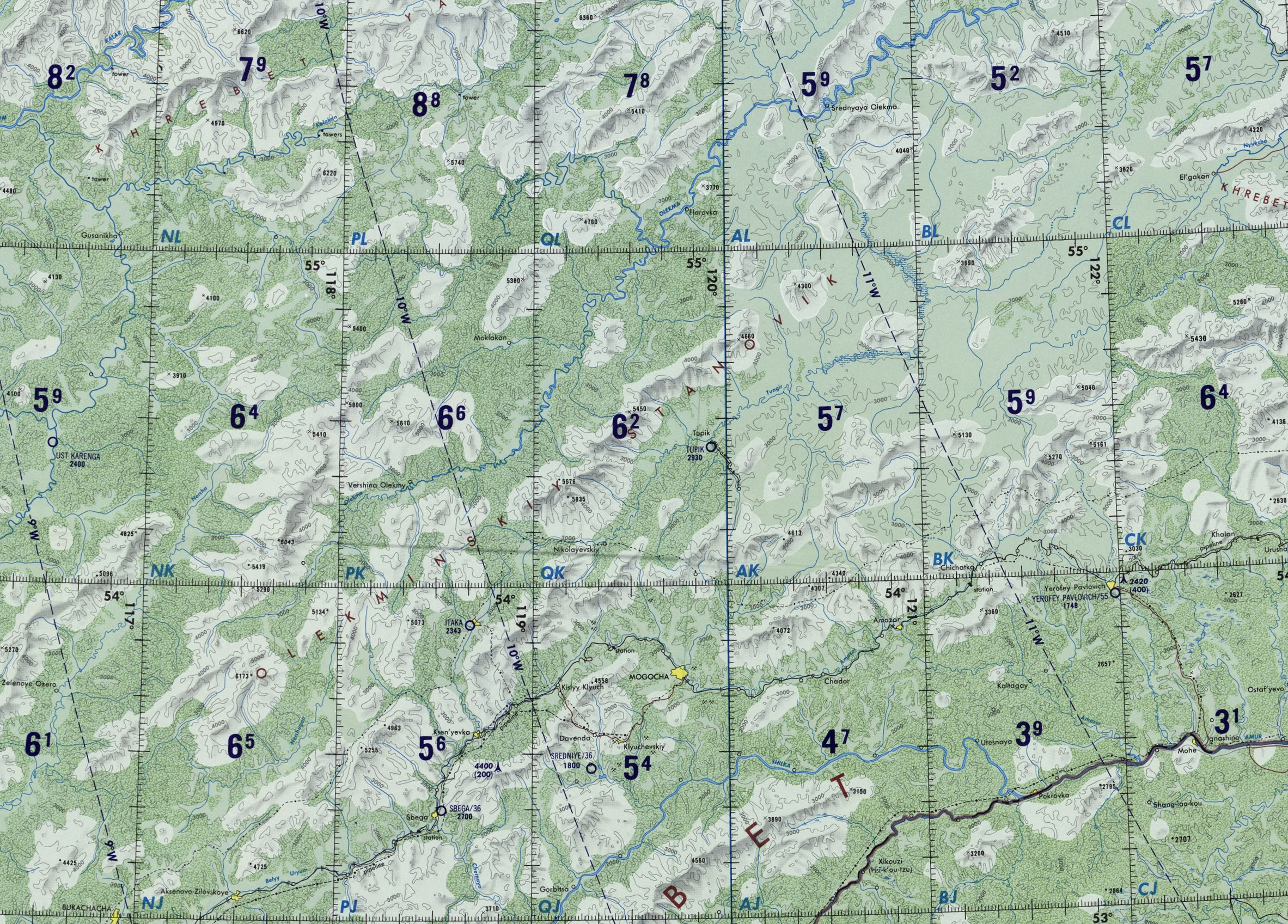
- Olyokma-Stanovik ONC chart section

Highest point
- Peak: Golets Kropotkin
- Elevation: 1,908 m (6,260 ft)
- Coordinates: 53°43′39″N 117°33′29″E

Dimensions
- Length: 400 km (250 mi) NE/SW
- Width: 250 km (160 mi) SE/NW

Geography
- Location within Zabaykalsky Krai
- Country: Russia
- Krai: Zabaykalsky Krai, Amur Oblast
- Range coordinates: 53°43′N 117°33′E
- Parent range: South Siberian System

Geology
- Orogeny: Alpine orogeny
- Rock age: Late Archean
- Rock type: Granite

Climbing
- Easiest route: From Itaka, Tupik or Gulya

The Olyokma-Stanovik (Russian: Олёкминский Становик; Olyokminsky Stanovik) is a system of mountain ranges in Zabaykalsky Krai, Russia. The western end of the range reaches into Amur Oblast.

== Geography ==
The Olyokma-Stanovik is part of the South Siberian System. It consists in a number of ranges of moderate height rising in the area of the sources of the Olyokma River and stretches roughly northeastwards for over 450 kilometers (280 mi). The width of the group of ranges reaches a maximum of 250 kilometers (160 mi) in its central part. Some of the ranges are separated by intermontane basins, such as the Upper Olyokma Depression, the Tungir Depression and the Nenyugin Depression.

The average summits of the Olyokma-Stanovik reach between 1,200 meters (3,900 ft) and 1,600 meters (5,200 ft). The highest point is a 1,908 meters (6,260 ft) high Golets Kropotkin. The range rises in an area prone to earthquakes.

=== Subranges ===
The ranges of the highlands include the following:

- Muroy Range, highest point 1,908 meters (6,260 ft) high Golets Kropotkin
- Olyokma-Stanovik Range, highest point 1,845 metres (6,053 ft) (unnamed)
- Khorkovy Range, highest point 1,584 metres (5,197 ft) high Urguchanskiy Golets
- Tungir Range, highest point 1,807 metres (5,928 ft) high Mount Guran
- Cheromny Range, highest point 1,431 metres (4,695 ft) (unnamed)
- Western Lyundor Range, highest point 1,463 metres (4,800 ft) (unnamed)
- Urusha Range, highest point 1,600 metres (5,200 ft) (unnamed); it includes the Nyukzha Ridge, a spur of the range where the sources of the Nyukzha river are located.
- Kiteme-Yunikal (хребет Китэмэ-Юникал), located in Tyndinsky District, Amur Oblast

=== Hydrography ===
The Olyokma-Stanovik forms the main watershed between the rivers of the Lena basin (flowing into the Arctic Ocean) and the ones of the Amur basin (flowing into the Pacific Ocean). The Olyokma, a right tributary of the Lena, and its tributaries Srednyaya Mokla, Tungir and Nyukzha have their sources in the highlands. Other important rivers originating in the highlands are the Nercha, Kuenga and Cherna, left tributaries of the Shilka, as well as the left tributaries of the Amur: Amazar, Urka and Urusha, among others.

== Flora ==
The slopes of the range are covered with larch taiga and pre-Alpine woodland up to 1,200 meters (3,900 ft), with dwarf birch in the bottoms of the river valleys. At elevations above 1,500 meters (4,900 ft) there is mountain tundra. Many peaks are crowned by ‘’golets’’ type bare summits.

== See also ==
- List of mountains and hills of Russia
