= Pankrushikha, Pankrushikhinsky Selsoviet, Pankrushikhinsky District, Altai Krai =

Town in Altai Krai, Russia

Coordinates: 53.826°N 80.346°E

Pankrushikha (Russian: Панкрушиха) is a rural locality (a selo) and the administrative center of Pankrushikhinsky District of Altai Krai, Russia. Population: 4,916 (2010 census); 5,201 (2002 census); 4,983 (1989 Soviet census).
