= Pankrushikhinsky District =

Pankrushikhinsky District Панкрушихинский район (Russian)
- District
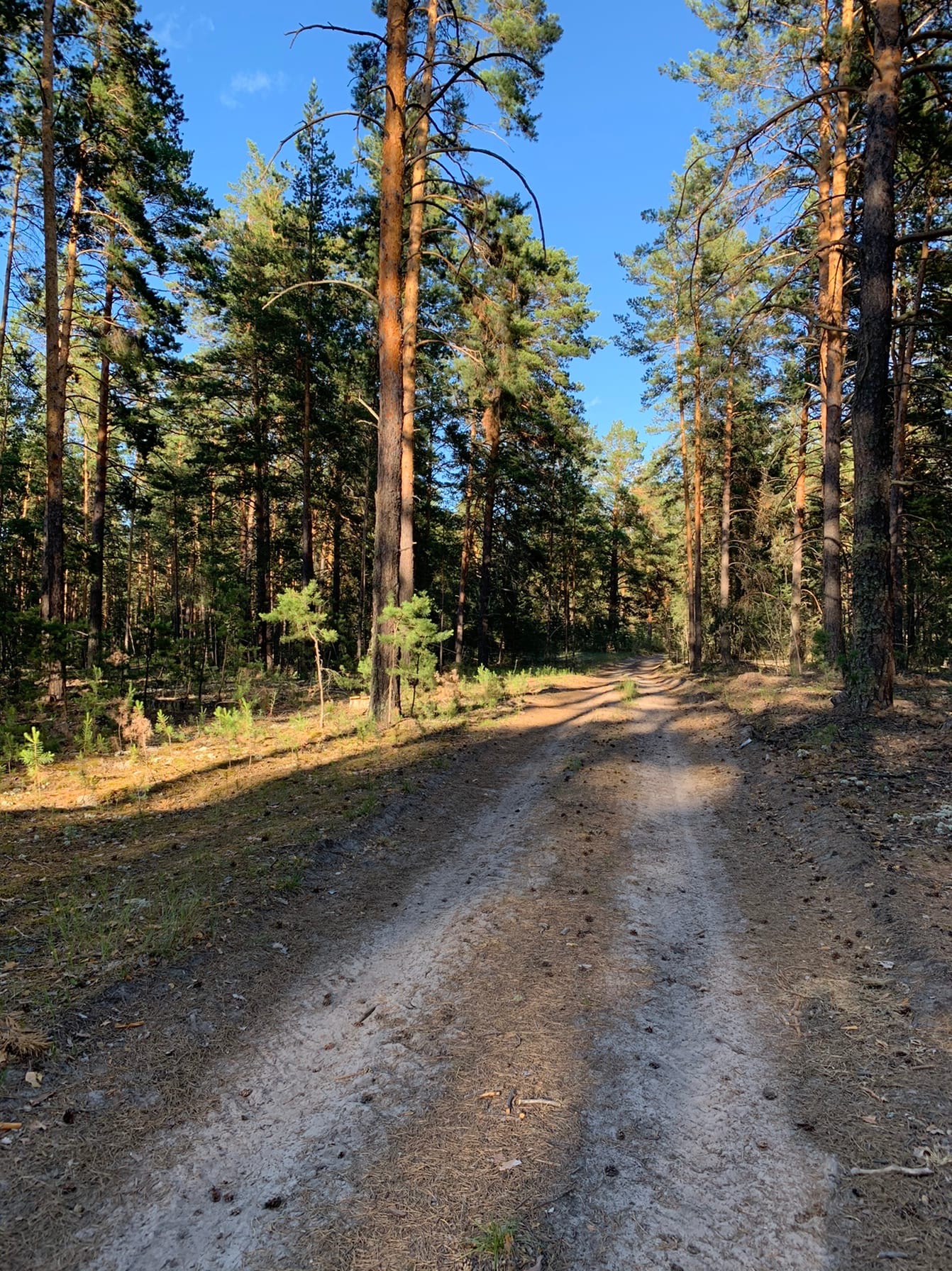

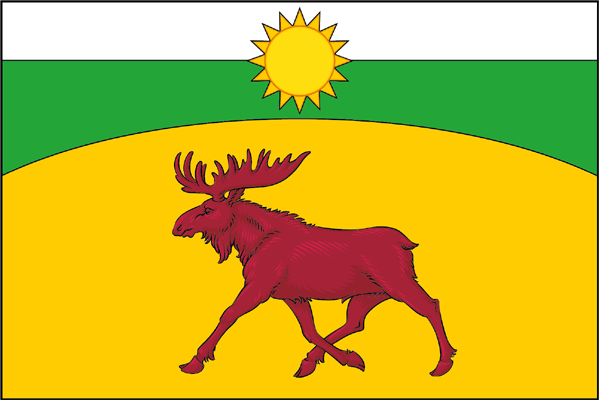
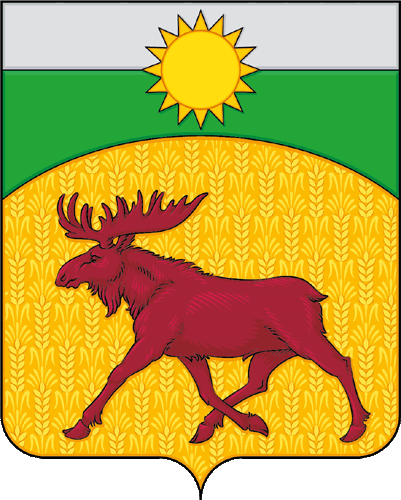
- Flag Coat of arms
- Location of Pankrushikhinsky District in Altai Krai
- Coordinates: 53°49′55″N 80°20′26″E
- Country: Russia
- Federal subject: Altai Krai
- Administrative center: Pankrushikha

Area
  - Total: 2,700 km^{2} (1,000 sq mi)

Population (2010 Census)
  - Total: 13,364
  - Density: 4.9/km^{2} (13/sq mi)
  - Urban: 0%
  - Rural: 100%

Administrative structure
  - Administrative divisions: 9 selsoviet
  - Inhabited localities: 30 rural localities

Municipal structure
  - Municipally incorporated as: Pankrushikhinsky Municipal District
  - Municipal divisions: 0 urban settlements, 9 rural settlements
- Time zone: UTC+7 (MSK+4)
- OKTMO ID: 01631000
- Website: www.altairegion22.ru

Pankrushikhinsky District (Russian: Панкруши́хинский райо́н) is an administrative and municipal district (raion), one of the fifty-nine in Altai Krai, Russia. It is located in the northwest of the krai. The area of the district is 2,700 square kilometers (1,000 sq mi). Its administrative center is the rural locality (a selo) of Pankrushikha. Population: 13,364 (2010 census); 16,763 (2002 census); 17,591 (1989 Soviet census). The population of the administrative center accounts for 36.8% of the district's total population.
