= Mogocha =

Town in Zabaykalsky Krai, Russia

Mogocha Могоча
- Town
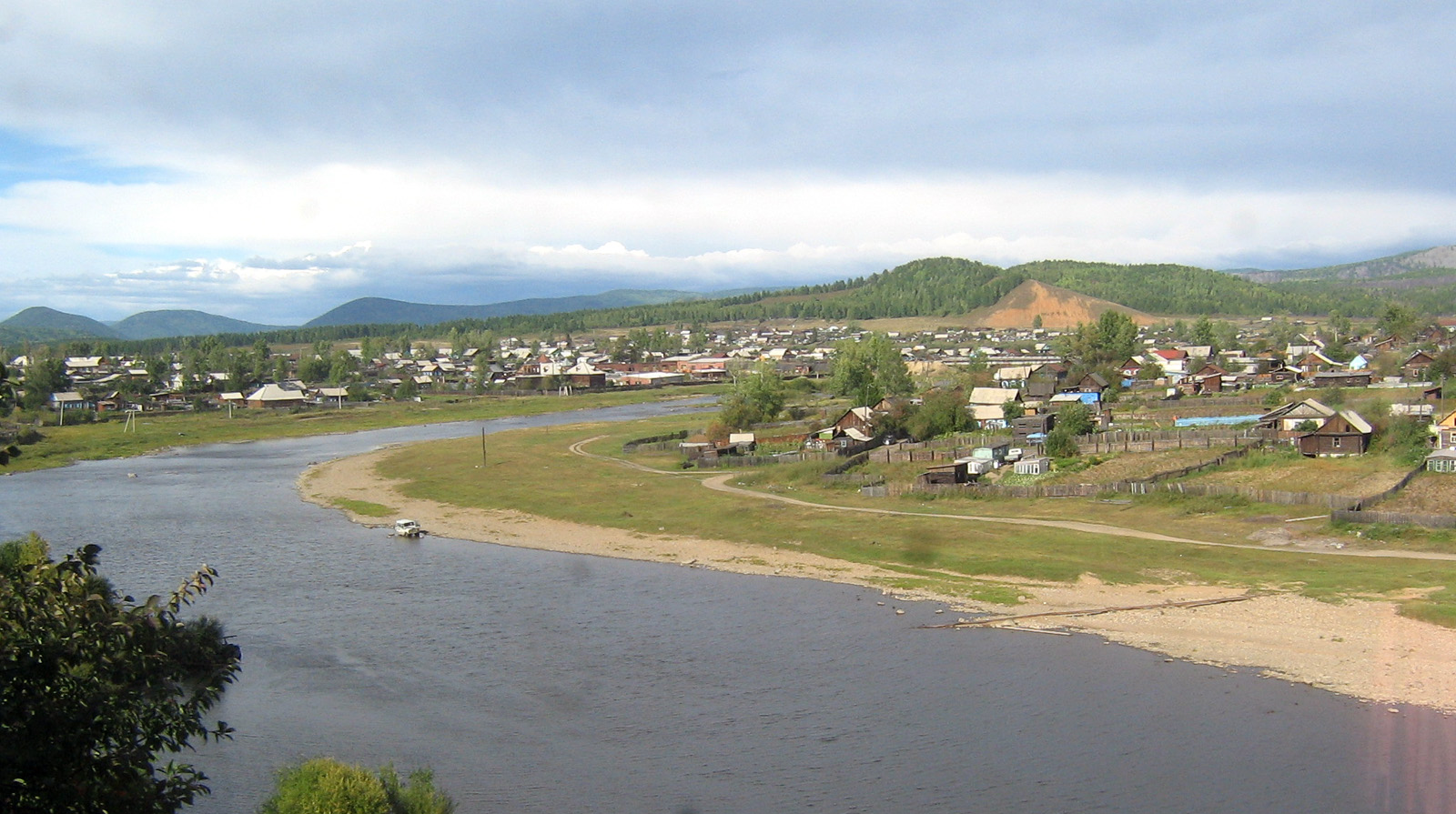
- View of Mogocha
- Interactive map of Mogocha
- Location of Mogocha Mogocha (Zabaykalsky Krai)
- Coordinates: 53°44′N 119°46′E
- Country: Russia
- Federal subject: Zabaykalsky Krai
- Administrative district: Mogochinsky District
- Founded: 1910
- Town status since: 1950
- Elevation: 620 m (2,030 ft)

Population (2010 Census)
  - Total: 13,258
  - Estimate (January 2014): 13,697 (+3.3%)

Administrative status
  - Capital of: Mogochinsky District

Municipal status
  - Municipal district: Mogochinsky Municipal District
  - Urban settlement: Mogochinskoye Urban Settlement
  - Capital of: Mogochinsky Municipal District, Mogochinskoye Urban Settlement
- Time zone: UTC+9 (MSK+6)
- Postal codes: 673730–673732, 673779
- Dialing code: +7 30241
- OKTMO ID: 76626101001

Mogocha (Russian: Могоча, IPA: [mɐˈgotɕə]) is a town and the administrative center of Mogochinsky District in Zabaykalsky Krai, Russia, located 709 kilometers (441 mi) northeast of Chita, the administrative center of the krai. Population: 13,258 (2010 census); 13,282 (2002 census); 17,847 (1989 Soviet census).

== Etymology ==
The name "Mogocha" is derived from the river on which it stands, whose name comes from the Evenki word mongochi. This meaning of this word is ambiguous; it can be translated as golden valley, but also as belonging to the Mongo tribe.

== Geography ==
Mogocha is located near of the southern slopes of the Olyokma-Stanovik, at the confluence of the Mogocha and Amazar rivers.

== History ==
It was founded in 1910, with the construction of the local section of the Trans-Siberian Railway. Rail traffic began in 1914. In addition to its status as a supply point for the railway, from the 1920s and 1930s it became the base for gold mining in the surrounding area. Town status was granted to it in 1950.

From 1947 until 1953, Mogocha was site for the Klyuchevlag prison labor camp of the gulag system. The camp held up to 3,000 prisoners at any one time, mainly used as forced labor for molybdenum and gold mining in the villages to the southwest of the town.

During the deterioration of Sino-Soviet relations in the 1950s, a large airbase was created near Mogocha, which hosted several helicopter regiments until the 1990s. The remoteness of Mogocha combined with the harsh climatic conditions, gave rise to the Soviet military slang expression God created Sochi, and Satan Mogocha.

After the dissolution of the Soviet Union and subsequent economic crisis, Mogocha lost around one third of its population, a common occurrence for cities in the Russian Far East. At the same time, a significant number of Chinese citizens and companies have moved to the region.

== Administrative and municipal status ==
Within the framework of administrative divisions, Mogocha serves as the administrative center of Mogochinsky District, to which it is directly subordinated. As a municipal division, the town of Mogocha, together with four rural localities, is incorporated within Mogochinsky Municipal District as Mogochinskoye Urban Settlement.

== Economy ==
Other than railway-related industries, there is logging and timber milling conducted in the surrounding area.

=== Transportation ===
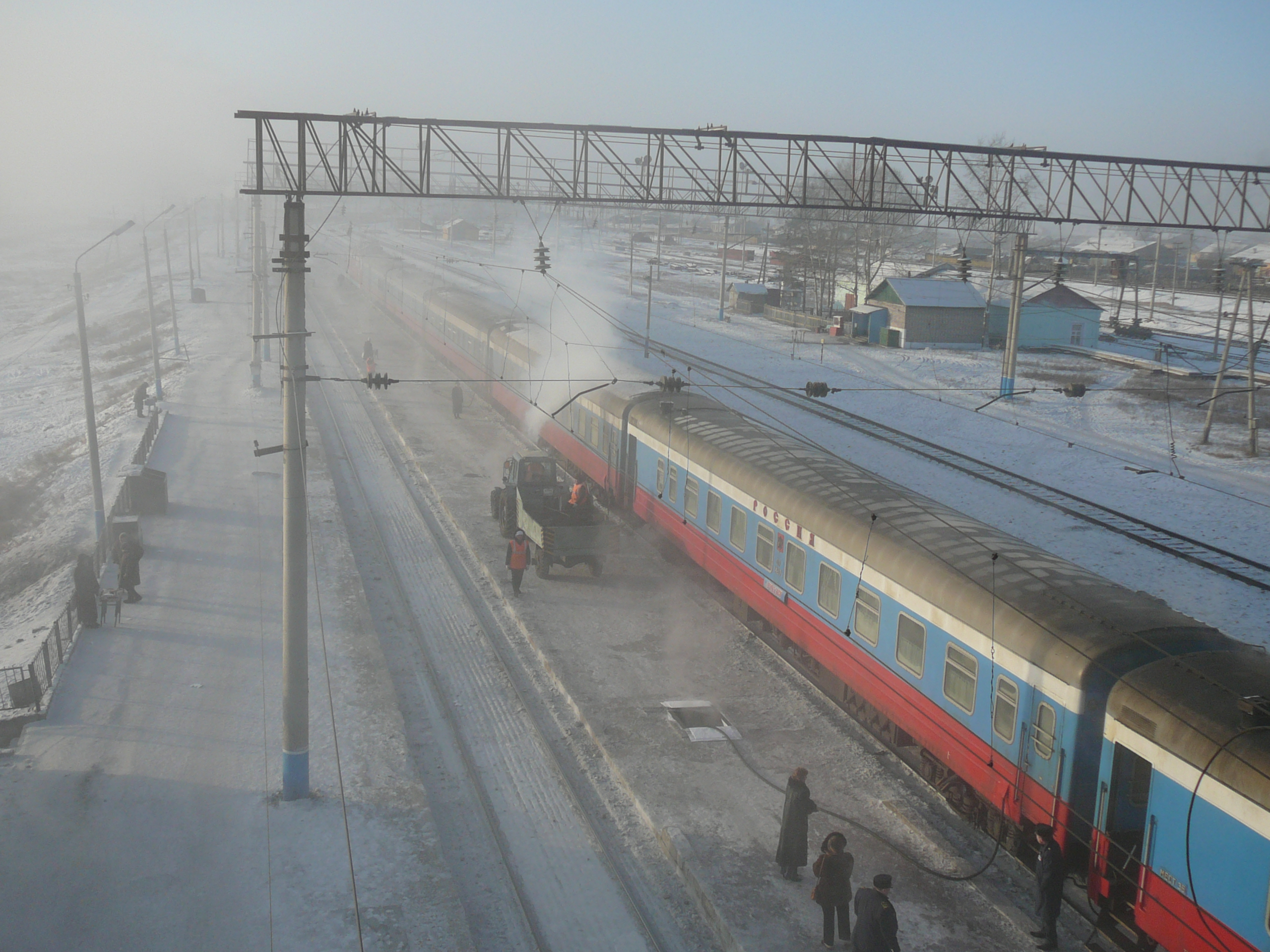
Winter train stop in Mogocha

Mogocha has a station on the Trans-Siberian Railway. The town's small airport, which had opened in 1937, was closed during the 1990s.

== Climate ==
Mogocha has a subarctic climate (Köppen climate classification Dwc) with bitterly cold, dry winters and mild, rainy summers.

Climate data for Mogocha
Month	Jan	Feb	Mar	Apr	May	Jun	Jul	Aug	Sep	Oct	Nov	Dec	Year
Record high °C (°F)	−3.2 (26.2)	6.3 (43.3)	14.3 (57.7)	23.1 (73.6)	31.9 (89.4)	35.4 (95.7)	37.6 (99.7)	33.8 (92.8)	29.6 (85.3)	21.5 (70.7)	9.5 (49.1)	2.0 (35.6)	37.6 (99.7)
Mean daily maximum °C (°F)	−20.5 (−4.9)	−12.9 (8.8)	−4.2 (24.4)	5.6 (42.1)	14.9 (58.8)	22.1 (71.8)	24.4 (75.9)	21.6 (70.9)	14.6 (58.3)	4.4 (39.9)	−10.5 (13.1)	−20.7 (−5.3)	3.2 (37.8)
Daily mean °C (°F)	−27.9 (−18.2)	−22.7 (−8.9)	−13.8 (7.2)	−1.9 (28.6)	7.0 (44.6)	14.0 (57.2)	17.1 (62.8)	14.5 (58.1)	7.3 (45.1)	−3.0 (26.6)	−17.8 (0.0)	−27.1 (−16.8)	−4.5 (23.9)
Mean daily minimum °C (°F)	−35.4 (−31.7)	−32.6 (−26.7)	−23.5 (−10.3)	−9.4 (15.1)	−1 (30)	5.8 (42.4)	9.8 (49.6)	7.3 (45.1)	−0.1 (31.8)	−10.4 (13.3)	−25.2 (−13.4)	−33.5 (−28.3)	−12.3 (9.9)
Record low °C (°F)	−48.8 (−55.8)	−51.5 (−60.7)	−44.2 (−47.6)	−29.3 (−20.7)	−16.7 (1.9)	−6.7 (19.9)	−3.1 (26.4)	−5.1 (22.8)	−12.8 (9.0)	−32 (−26)	−43.6 (−46.5)	−51.7 (−61.1)	−51.7 (−61.1)
Average precipitation mm (inches)	3.3 (0.13)	3.6 (0.14)	5.5 (0.22)	16.9 (0.67)	34.4 (1.35)	75.0 (2.95)	114.9 (4.52)	105.0 (4.13)	49.9 (1.96)	14.3 (0.56)	10.2 (0.40)	5.7 (0.22)	438.7 (17.25)
Average precipitation days	4.5	4.2	4.5	5.9	8.7	14.1	15.4	14.9	10.6	5.8	6.9	6.4	101.9
Mean monthly sunshine hours	124	172	232	224	247	242	234	202	173	175	134	103	2,262
Source: climatebase.ru (1910-2012)
