= Mogochinsky District =

Mogochinsky District Могочинский район (Russian)
- District
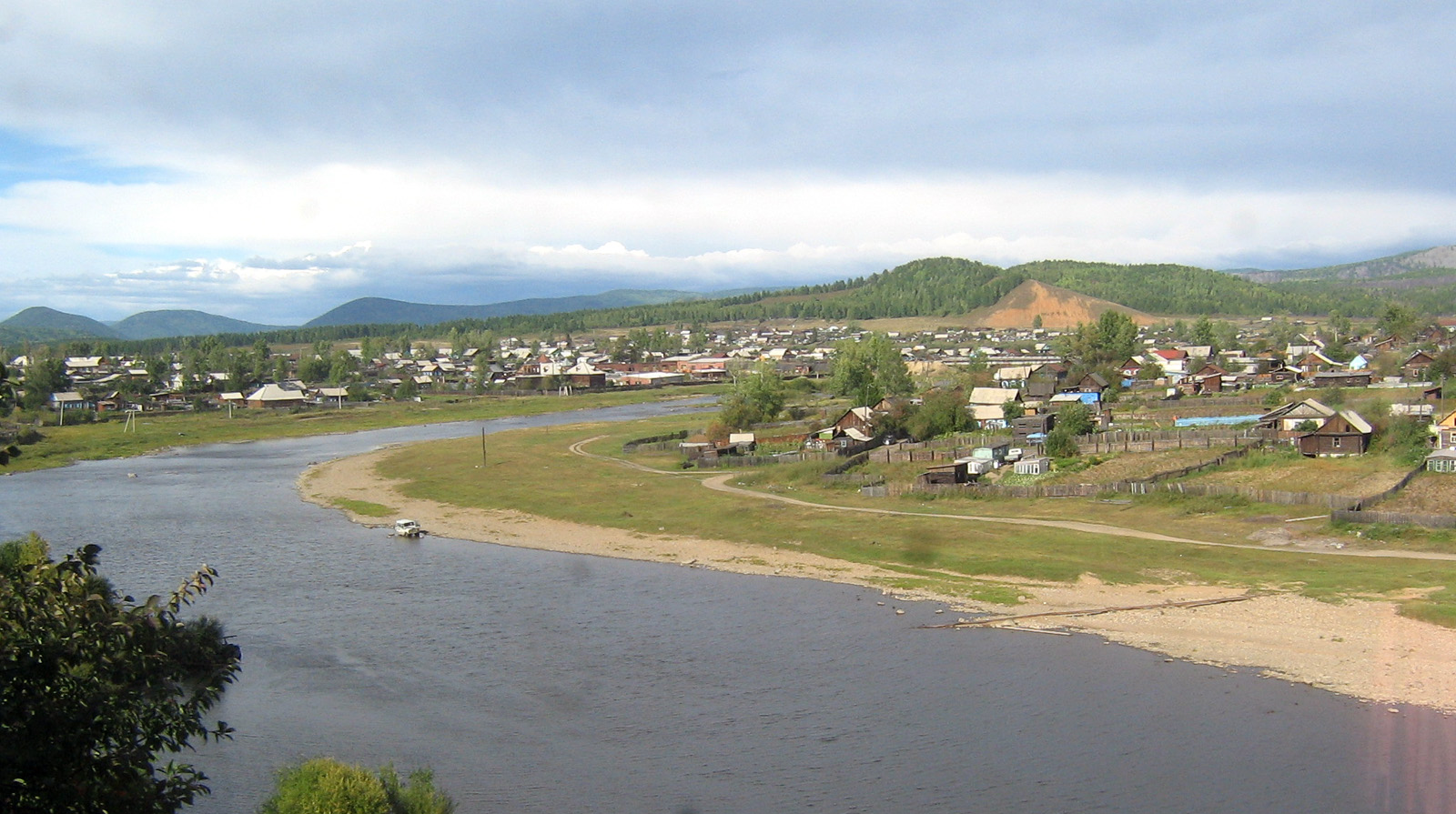
- The town of Mogocha, the administrative center of Mogochinsky District

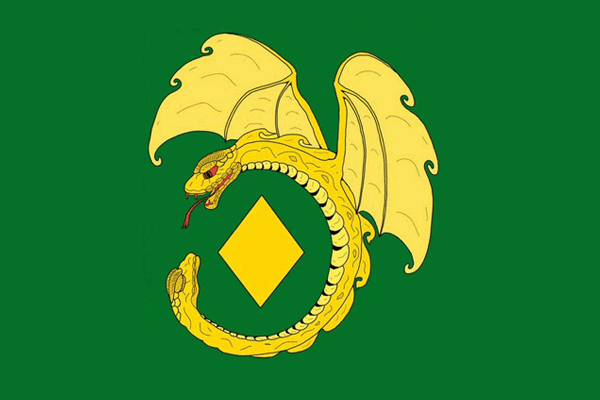
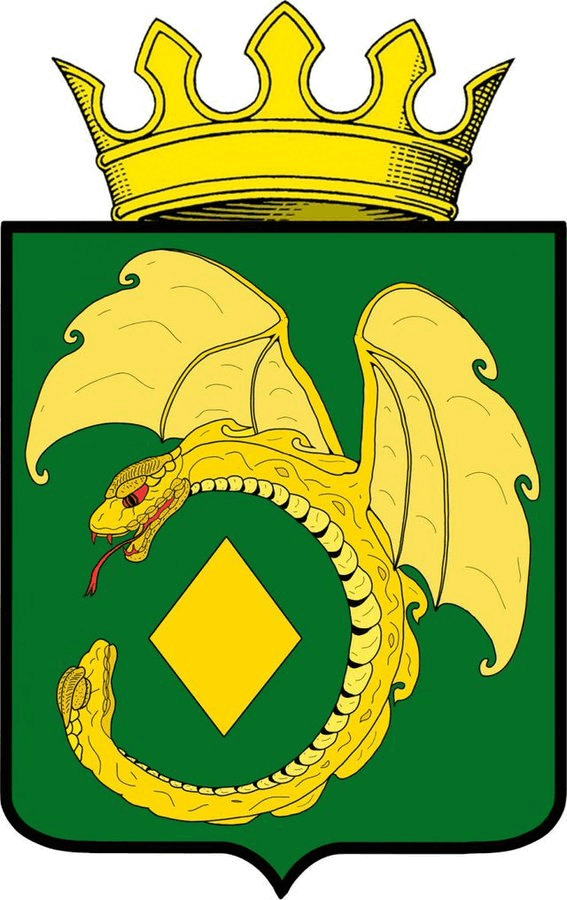
- Flag Coat of arms
- Location of Mogochinsky District in Zabaykalsky Krai
- Coordinates: 53°41′N 120°11′E
- Country: Russia
- Federal subject: Zabaykalsky Krai
- Established: January 4, 1926
- Administrative center: Mogocha

Area
  - Total: 25,500 km^{2} (9,800 sq mi)

Population (2010 Census)
  - Total: 25,508
  - Estimate (2018): 24,474 (−4.1%)
  - Density: 1.00/km^{2} (2.59/sq mi)
  - Urban: 82.9%
  - Rural: 17.1%

Administrative structure
  - Inhabited localities: 1 cities/towns, 5 urban-type settlements, 26 rural localities

Municipal structure
  - Municipally incorporated as: Mogochinsky Municipal District
  - Municipal divisions: 5 urban settlements, 2 rural settlements
- Time zone: UTC+9 (MSK+6)
- OKTMO ID: 76626000
- Website: http://могоча.забайкальскийкрай.рф

Population of Mogochinsky District
- 2010 Census: 25,508
- 2002 Census: 27,225
- 1989 Census: 37,944
- 1979 Census: 39,565

Mogochinsky District (Russian: Мого́чинский райо́н) is an administrative and municipal district (raion), one of the thirty-one in Zabaykalsky Krai, Russia. It is located in the east of the krai and borders China in the east and south. The area of the district is 25,500 square kilometers (9,800 sq mi). Its administrative center is the town of Mogocha. As of the 2010 Census, the total population of the district was 25,508, with the population of Mogocha accounting for 52.0% of that number.

== History ==
The district was established on January 4, 1926. In June 2023, all municipal formations of the district were merged into a single Mogochinsky Municipal Okrug.

== Geography ==
The northern part of the district is located in the Olyokma-Stanovik Highlands area. The Amazar, one of the tributaries of the Amur, flows across it.
