= Chapo-Ologo =

Chapo-Ologo Чапо-Олого
- Selo
- Location within Zabaykalsky Krai Location within Russia
- Coordinates: 57°04′N 118°49′E
- Country: Russia
- Region: Zabaykalsky Krai
- District: Kalarsky District
- Time zone: UTC+9:00

Chapo-Ologo (Russian: Чапо-Олого) is a rural locality (a selo) in Kalarsky District, Zabaykalsky Krai, Russia. Population: 128 (2021 census); 155 (2010 census); 164 (2002 census); There are 4 streets in this selo.

== Geography ==
This rural locality is located 39 km from Chara (the district's administrative centre), 646 km from Chita (capital of Zabaykalsky Krai) and 4,910 km from Moscow. Ikabya is the nearest rural locality.
