= Kyust-Kemda =

Kyust-Kemda Кюсть-Кемда
- Selo
- Location within Zabaykalsky Krai Location within Russia
- Coordinates: 56°58′N 118°19′E
- Country: Russia
- Region: Zabaykalsky Krai
- District: Kalarsky District
- Time zone: UTC+9:00

Kyust-Kemda (Russian: Кюсть-Кемда) is a rural locality (a selo) in Kalarsky District, Zabaykalsky Krai, Russia. Population: 187 (2021 census); 216 (2010 census); 281 (2002 census); There are 8 streets in this selo.

== Geography ==
This rural locality is located 8 km from Chara (the district's administrative centre), 621 km from Chita (capital of Zabaykalsky Krai) and 4,894 km from Moscow. Chara is the nearest rural locality.
