= Nelyaty =

Nelyaty Неляты
- Selo
- Location within Zabaykalsky Krai Location within Russia
- Coordinates: 56°29′N 115°42′E
- Country: Russia
- Region: Zabaykalsky Krai
- District: Kalarsky District
- Time zone: UTC+9:00

Nelyaty (Russian: Неляты) is a rural locality (a selo) in Kalarsky District, Zabaykalsky Krai, Russia. Population: 46 (2021 census); 74 (2010 census); There is 1 street in this selo.

== Geography ==
This rural locality is located 164 km from Chara (the district's administrative centre), 514 km from Chita (capital of Zabaykalsky Krai) and 4,794 km from Moscow. Bargalino is the nearest rural locality.
