= Udokan (settlement) =

Udokan Удокан
- Settlement
- Location within Zabaykalsky Krai Location within Russia
- Coordinates: 56°45′N 118°18′E
- Country: Russia
- Region: Zabaykalsky Krai
- District: Kalarsky District
- Time zone: UTC+9:00

Udokan (Russian: Удокан) is a rural locality (a settlement) in Kalarsky District, Zabaykalsky Krai, Russia. Population: 102 (2021 census); 128 (2010 census); 178 (2002 census); There are 7 streets in this selo.

== Geography ==
This rural locality is located 17 km from Chara (the district's administrative centre), 601 km from Chita (capital of Zabaykalsky Krai) and 4,920 km from Moscow. Novaya Chara is the nearest rural locality.
