= Apantesis kodara =

Scientific classification
- Kingdom: Animalia
- Phylum: Arthropoda
- Clade: Pancrustacea
- Class: Insecta
- Order: Lepidoptera
- Superfamily: Noctuoidea
- Family: Erebidae
- Subfamily: Arctiinae
- Genus: Apantesis
- Species: A. kodara

Binomial name
- Apantesis kodara (Dubatolov & Schmidt, 2005)

Synonyms
- Grammia kodara Dubatolov & Schmidt, 2005

Species of moth

Apantesis kodara is a moth of the family Erebidae. It was described by Vladimir Viktorovitch Dubatolov and B. Christian Schmidt in 2005. It is found in the Kodar Mountains in Chita Province, Russia.

The length of the forewings is 12–16.5 mm for males and 17–19.8 mm for females. The forewings are black dorsally and yellowish white. The hindwings are yellow or entirely grey with black markings. Adults are on wing from mid-June to mid-July.

This species was formerly a member of the genus Grammia, but was moved to Apantesis along with the other species of the genera Grammia, Holarctia, and Notarctia.
