= Ikabya =

Ikabya Икабья
- Settlement
- Location within Zabaykalsky Krai Location within Russia
- Coordinates: 56°59′N 118°46′E
- Country: Russia
- Region: Zabaykalsky Krai
- District: Kalarsky District
- Time zone: UTC+9:00

Ikabya (Russian: Икабья) is a rural locality (a settlement) in Kalarsky District, Zabaykalsky Krai, Russia. Population: 362 (2021 census); 505 (2010 census); 510 (2002 census); There are 11 streets in this settlement.

== Geography ==
This rural locality is located 33 km from Chara (the district's administrative centre), 638 km from Chita (capital of Zabaykalsky Krai) and 4,917 km from Moscow. Chalo-Ologo is the nearest rural locality.
