= Joseph Martin (explorer) =

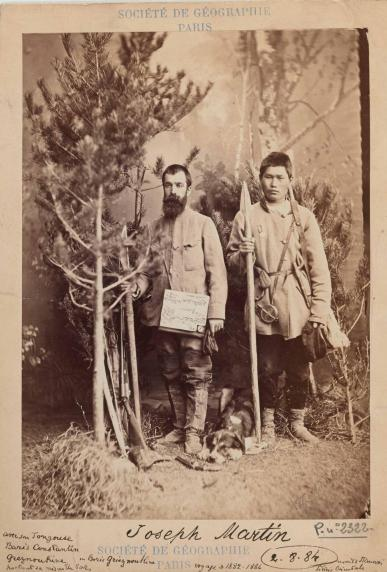
- Joseph Martin and Tungus guide Boris Gryeznukin.
- Born: 15 August 1848; Vienne, Isère, France
- Died: 23 May 1892 (aged 43); Novy Margelan (Fergana), Turkestan Krai, Russian Empire
- Awards: Order of Saint Stanislaus

Joseph-Napoléon Martin (Russian: Жозеф Наполеон Мартен; 15 August 1848 in Vienne, Isère – 23 May 1892 in Novy Margelan, now Fergana, Turkestan Krai, Russian Empire, present-day Uzbekistan) was a French explorer, topographer and geologist. He is known for his pioneering exploration and research in the Russian Far East.

== Biography ==
After finishing his studies in railway engineering Joseph Martin went to the Russian Empire and participated in the Russo-Turkish War (1877–1878). He was awarded the II Degree Order of Saint Stanislaus for his engineering work near Pleven in Bulgaria. Following the end of the war he went to Siberia, where he would stay for about two years. He returned again twice in the following decade, in 1882-1883 and 1889-1892.

Joseph Martin picked up the threads of the explorations made previously by Peter Kropotkin to find a route between the Lena and the Amur basins, surveying the then little-known Stanovoy Highlands. He made a significant contribution to the cartography of Eastern Siberia and was awarded the gold medal of the Imperial Russian Geographical Society. On his last journey Joseph Martin wished to explore the Russian Turkestan, but he fell ill while traveling westwards across China and died in May 1892 in Novy Margelan. His tomb is in the Fergana graveyard, Uzbekistan.

== Posthumous honors ==
Pik Martena (Russian: Пик Мартена) in the Kodar Range, part of the Stanovoy, was named in his honor. A street in Vienne, the town of his birth, bears his name.

== See also ==
- Svetlana Gorshenina
