= Pik Tofalariya =

Mountain in Irkutsk Oblast, Russia

- Пик Тофалария
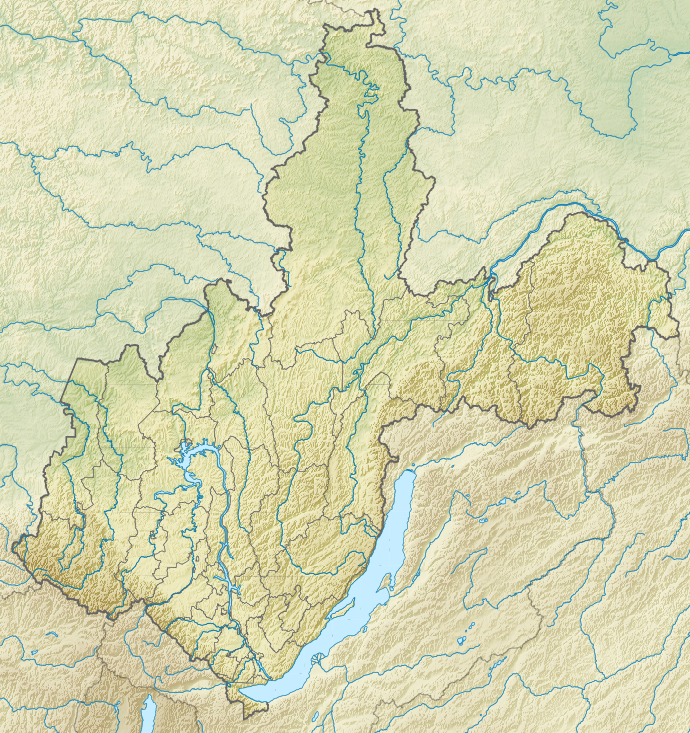
- Location within Irkutsk Oblast Location within Russia

Highest point
- Elevation: 2,892 m (9,488 ft)
- Coordinates: 53°38′27″N 97°14′15″E

Geography
- Location: Irkutsk Oblast, Russia
- Parent range: Eastern Sayan; Sayan Mountains

Pik Tofalariya (Russian: Пик Тофалария, lit. 'Tofalaria Peak') is a peak in Irkutsk Oblast, Russia. Although some sources claim it is the highest point of the federal subject, in topographic charts it is marked as a 2,892 metres (9,488 ft) high peak. Thus 2,988 metres (9,803 ft) high Pik Martena in the Kodar Range is the highest point of Irkutsk Oblast.

This mountain is named after the Tofalar people.

== Description ==
Pik Tofalariya is located in the Eastern Sayan, Sayan Mountains, South Siberian System. It rises above the Tofalariya territory, in the southwestern part of Nizhneudinsky District, near the Tuva border. The Uda river flows to the north of the northern slopes.

== See also ==
- List of highest points of Russian federal subjects
- List of mountains and hills of Russia
