= Pik Martena =

Mountain in Irkutsk Oblast, Russia

- Пик Мартена
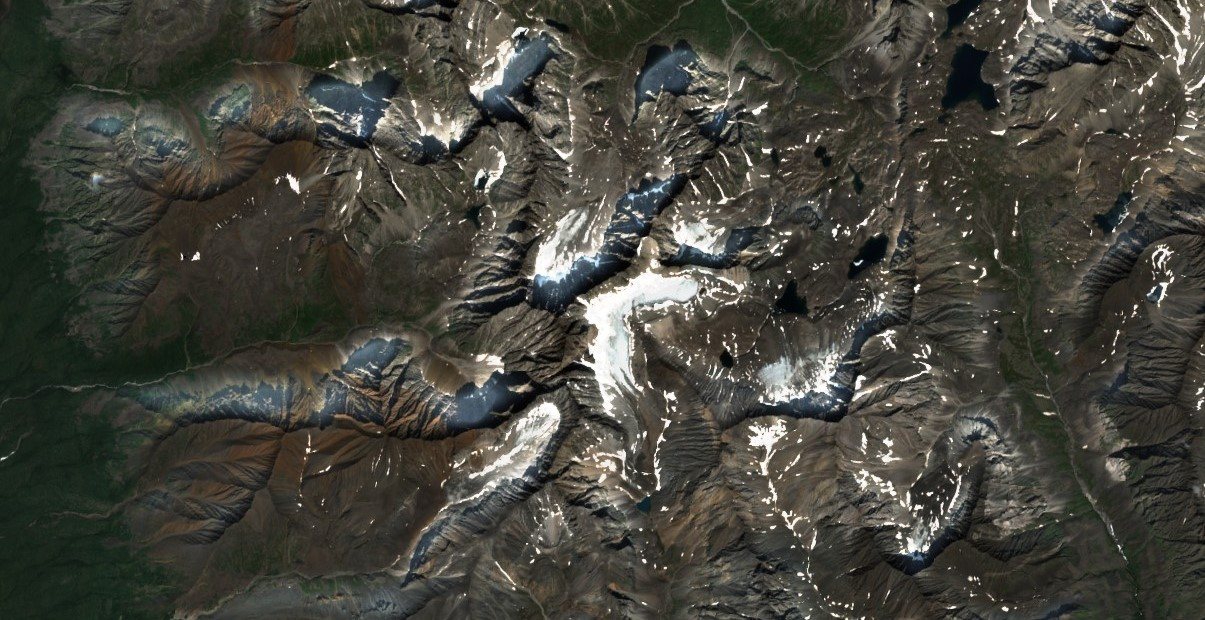
- Pik Martena Sentinel-2 image

Highest point
- Elevation: 2,988 m (9,803 ft)
- Prominence: 740 m (2,430 ft)
- Coordinates: 56°50′49″N 117°24′09″E

Geography
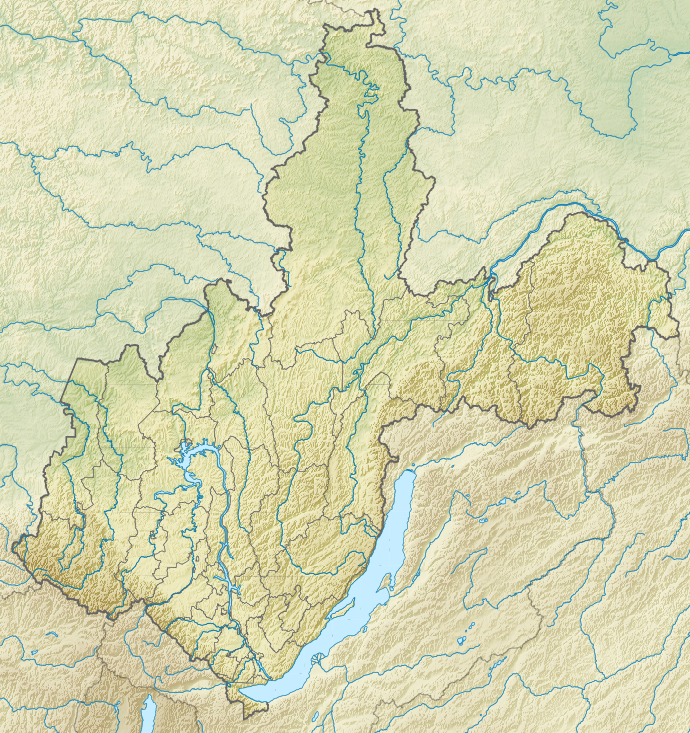
- Location within Irkutsk Oblast Location within Russia
- Location: Irkutsk Oblast, Russia
- Parent range: Kodar Range; Stanovoy Highlands

Pik Martena (Russian: Пик Мартена), Martin Peak, is a peak in Bodaybinsky District, Irkutsk Oblast, Russia. It is the highest point of the federal subject. Other sources claim Pik Tofalariya, located at the southwestern limit of the federal subject, as the highest point of Irkutsk Oblast.

This mountain is named after French explorer of Eastern Siberia Joseph Martin (1848–1892).

== Description ==
Pik Martena is a 2,988 metres (9,803 ft) high mountain located in the Kodar Range, Stanovoy Highlands, South Siberian System. Some sources give a height of 2,932 metres (9,619 ft). It rises 8 kilometers (5.0 mi) to the WSW of Pik BAM, beyond the Zabaykalsky Krai border.

== See also ==
- List of highest points of Russian federal subjects
- List of mountains and hills of Russia
