= BAM Peak =

Mountain in Russia

Pik Bam
- Пик БАМ
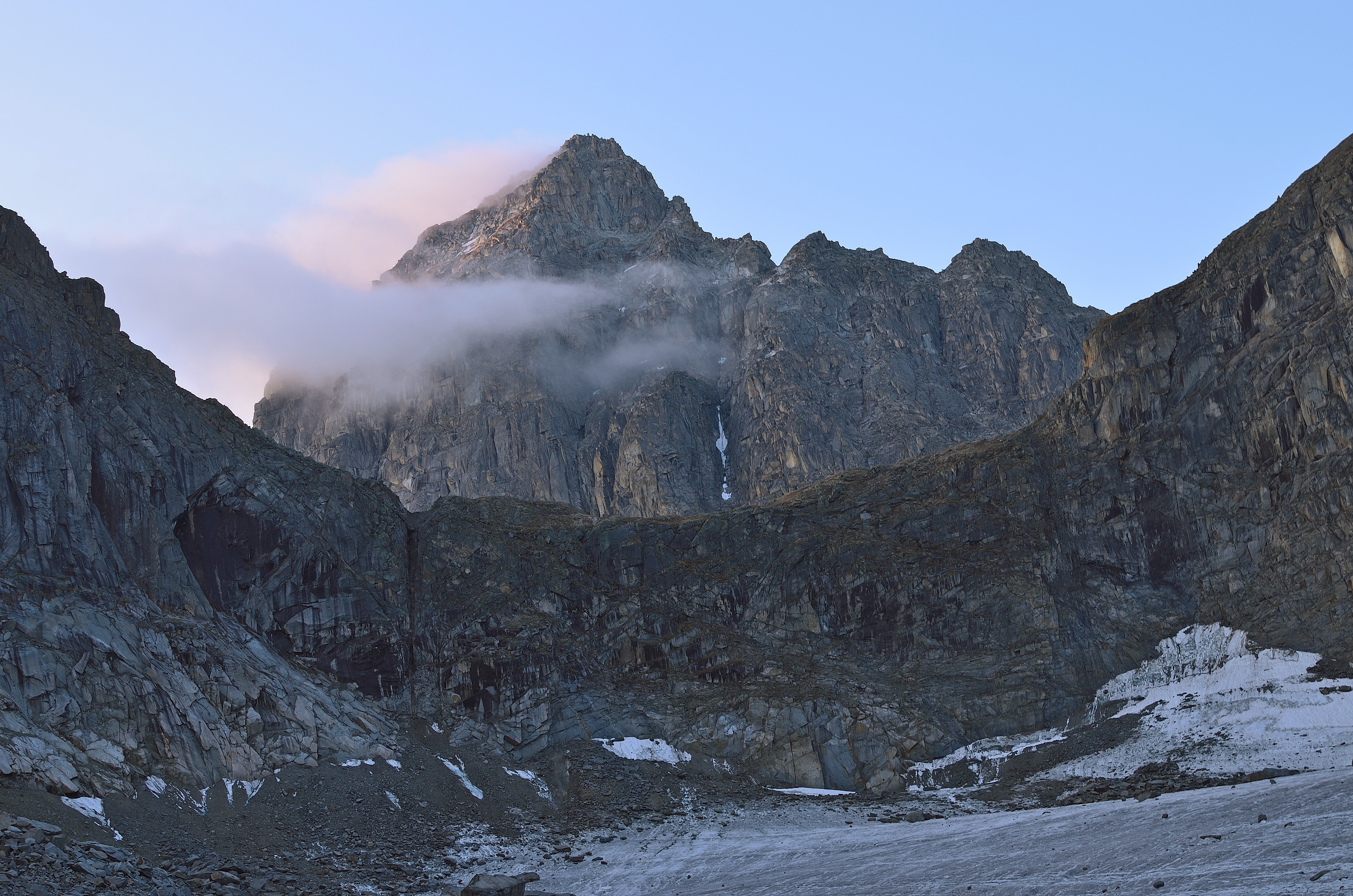

Highest point
- Elevation: 3,072 m (10,079 ft)
- Prominence: 2,230 m (7,320 ft)
- Listing: Ultra, Ribu
- Coordinates: 56°51′54.85″N 117°34′47.32″E

Geography
- Location within Zabaykalsky Krai
- Location: Zabaykalsky Krai, Russia
- Parent range: Kodar Range

Pik BAM (Russian: Пик БАМ) is a mountain in Zabaykalsky Krai, Russia. It reaches 3,072 metres (10,079 ft) above sea level. It was named after the Baikal Amur Mainline railway, which passes south of it. It is the highest summit of the Kodar Range and the Stanovoy Highlands, as well as of Zabaykalsky Krai. The nearest town is Novaya Chara. Pik Martena rises 8 kilometers (5.0 mi) to the WSW of Pik BAM, beyond the Zabaykalsky Krai border.

== See also ==
- List of highest points of Russian federal subjects
- List of mountains and hills of Russia
- List of ultras of Northeast Asia
