= Chara Sands =

Area of sand in Siberia

Coordinates: 56.84°N 118.15°E

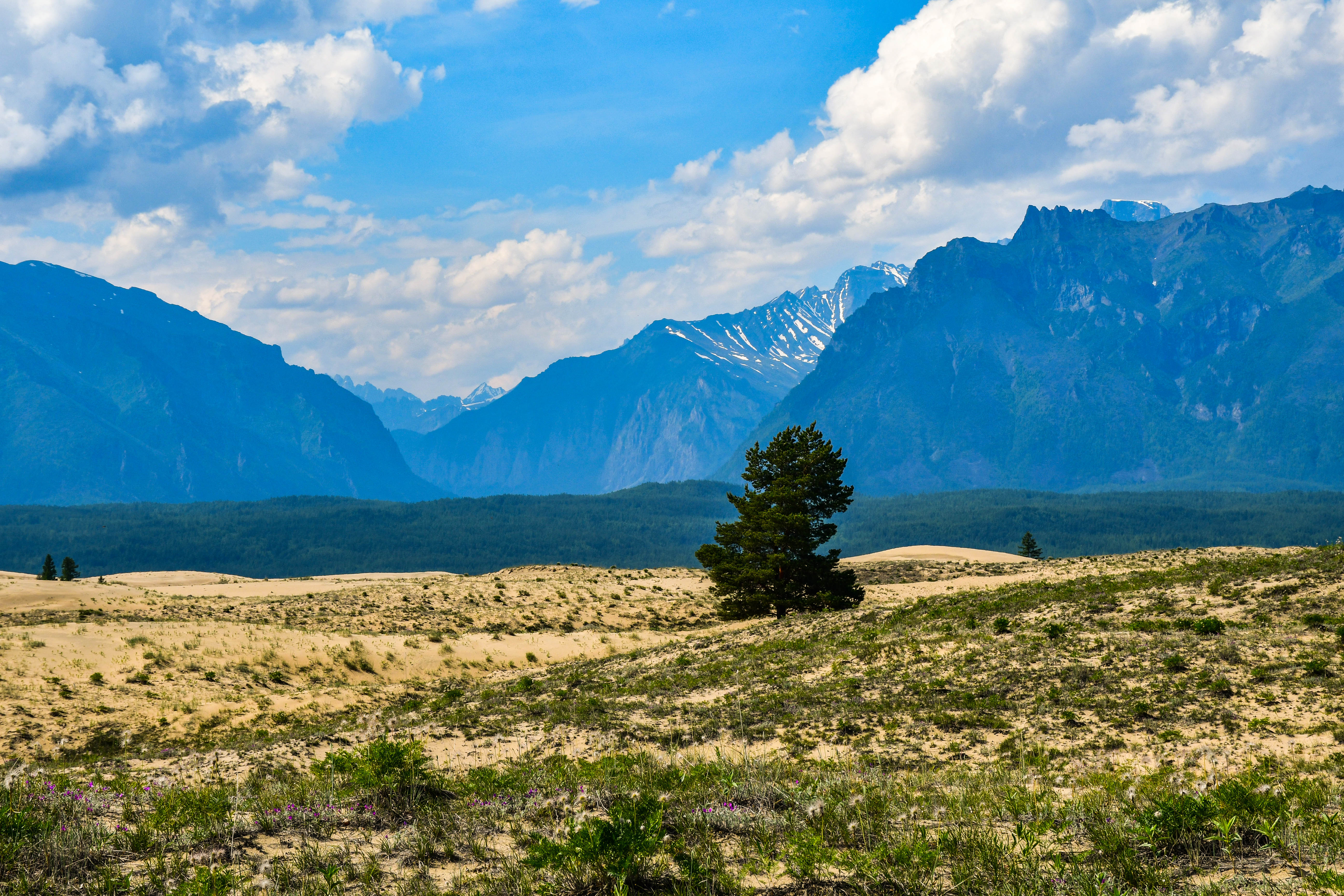
The Chara Sands, a desert like area in the middle of Siberia, as seen near Novaya Chara. The Kodar Mountains lie in the background.

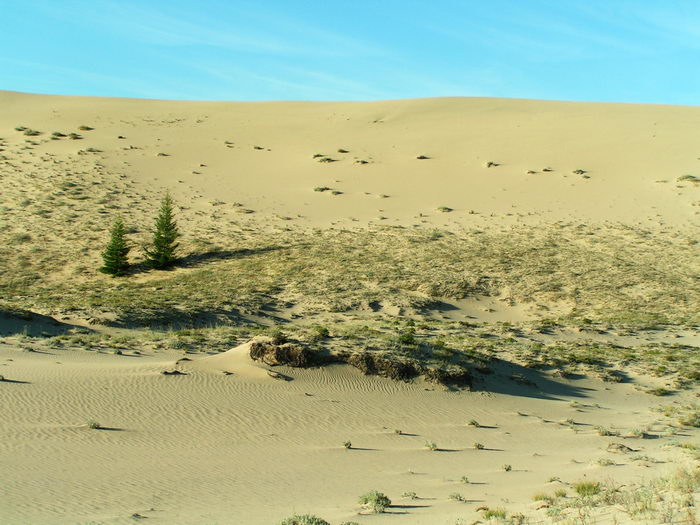
Dune in the Charsky Sands

The Chara Sands is an area of sand in Siberia near the Kodar and Udokan mountain ranges. It is a small desert 3 kilometers (1.9 mi) wide by 6 kilometers (3.7 mi) long, located in the Charsk basin amid the valleys of Chara, Middle Sakukan and Upper Sakukan rivers. The rapid change from the pine and larch forests and peat bogs to the sand has no transition zone—this is one of the peculiarities of this unusual area, besides the roaming sand dunes and the oases that emerge among them.

The Chara Sands is estimated to have formed during the last glacial period 55 to 100 thousand years ago being what is left of an extinct lake formed by runoff from the Sakukan glacier.

== View ==
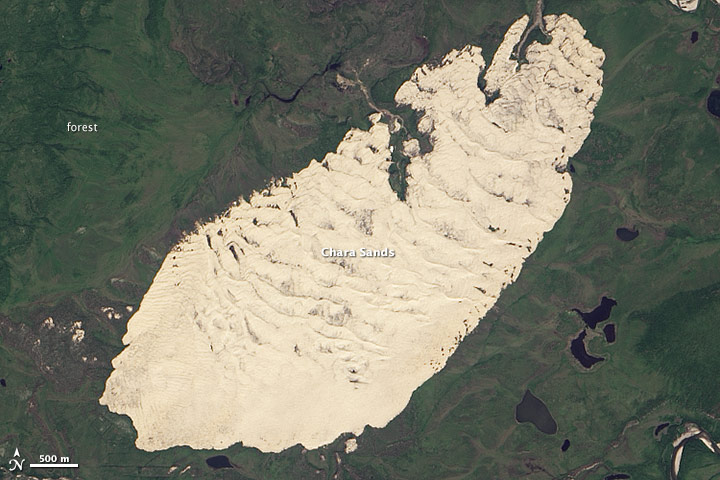
Chara Sands from orbit

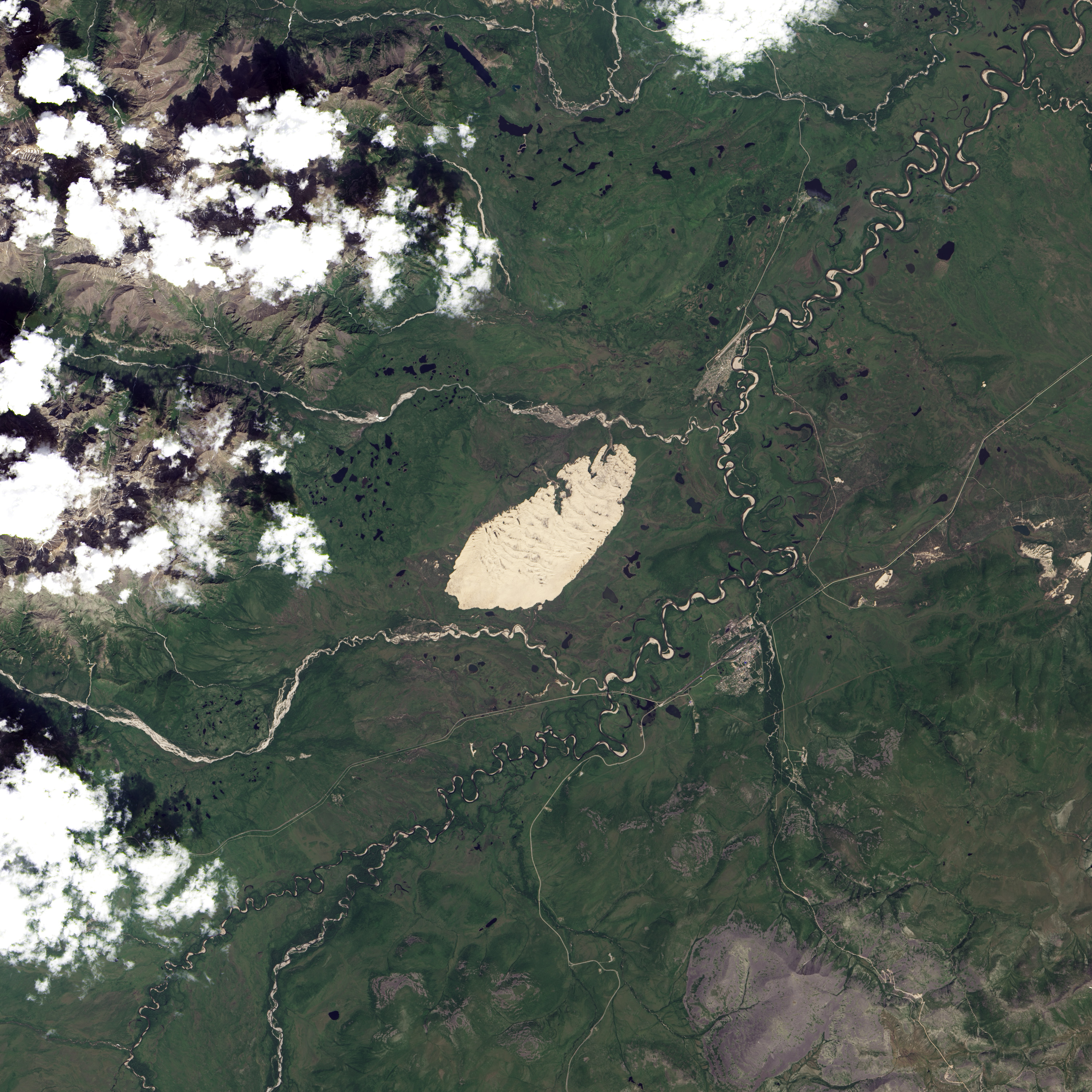
Chara Sands, Zabaikalsky region

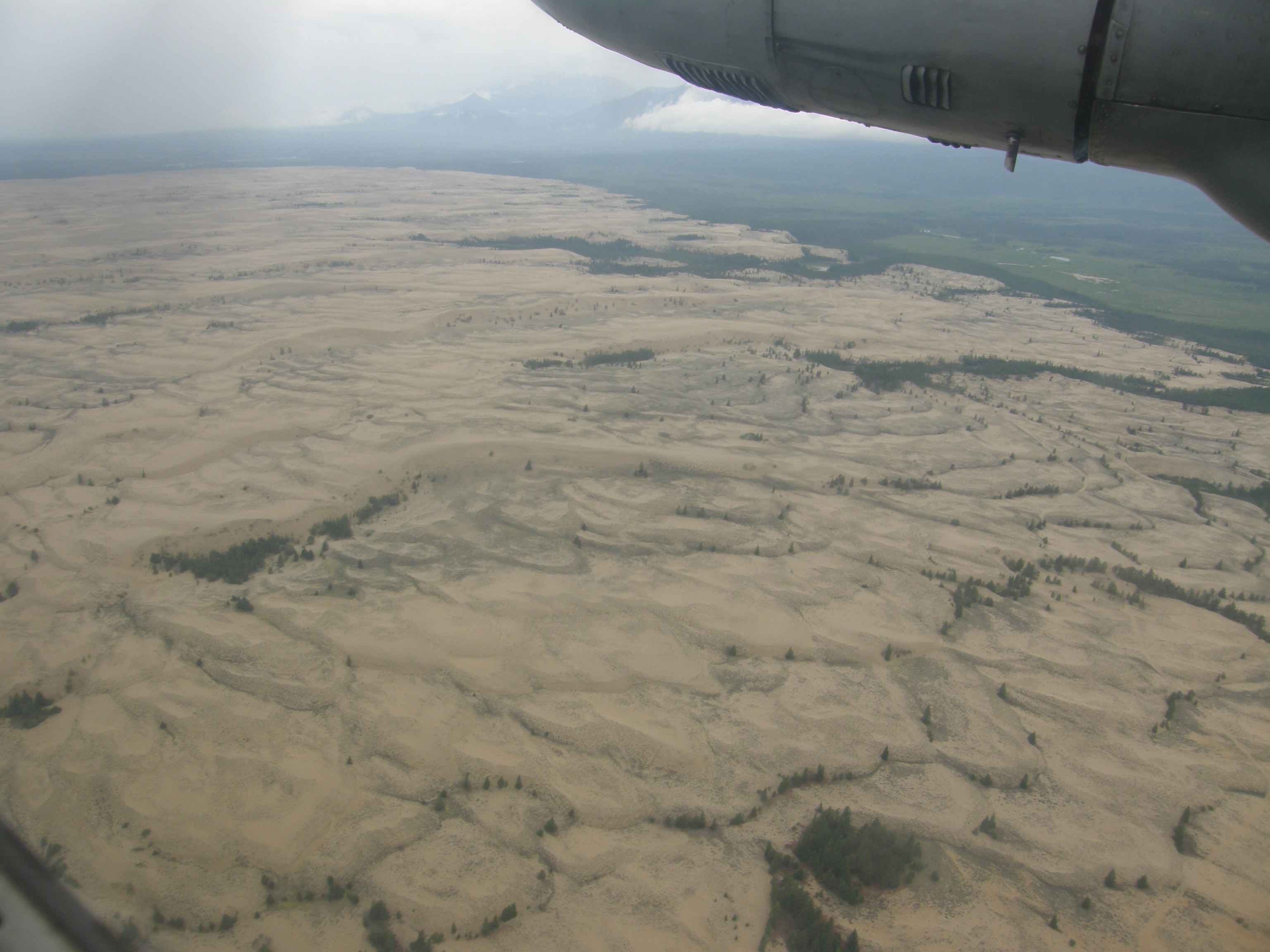

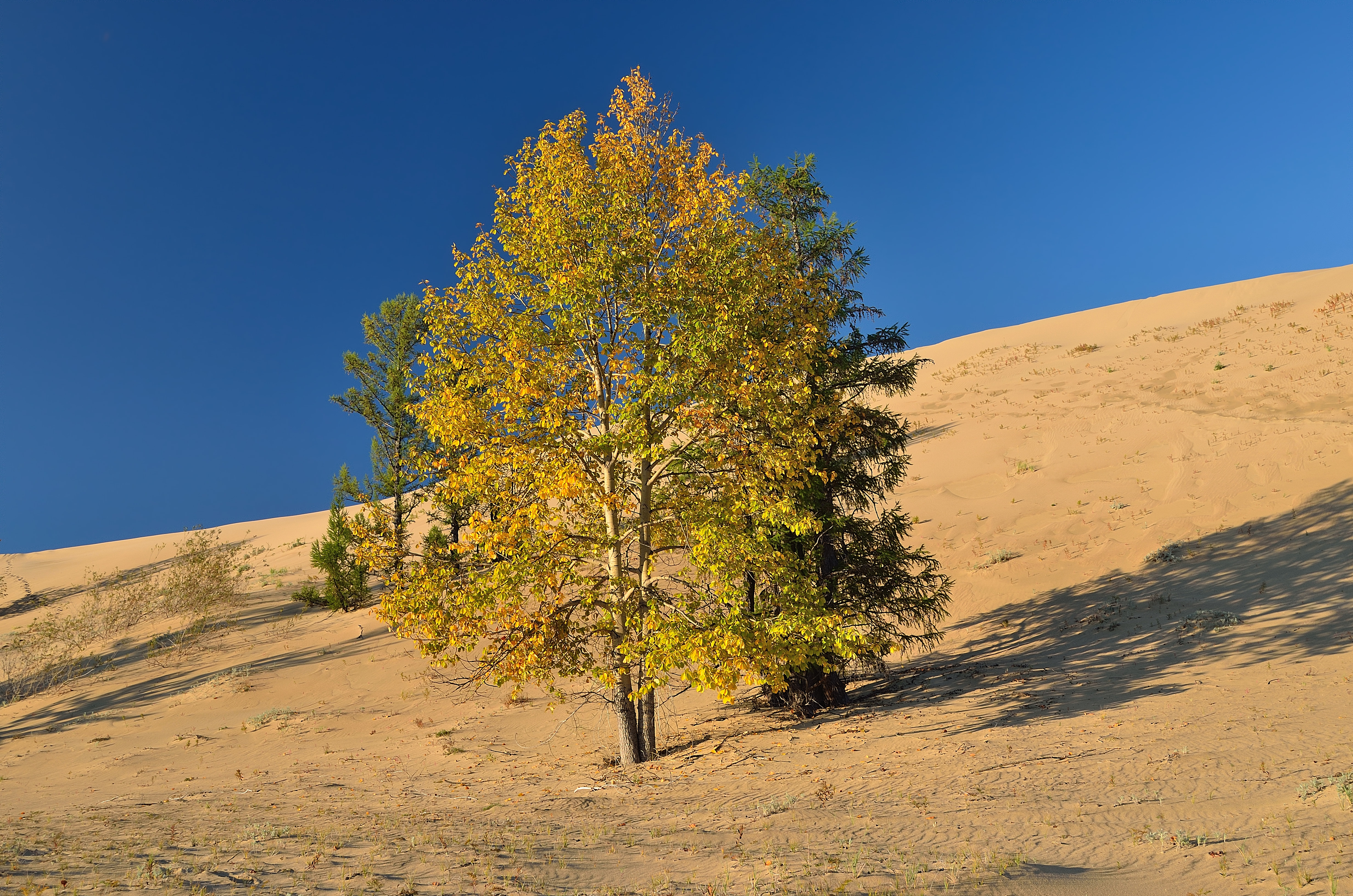
Solitary dwarf pines and larchs

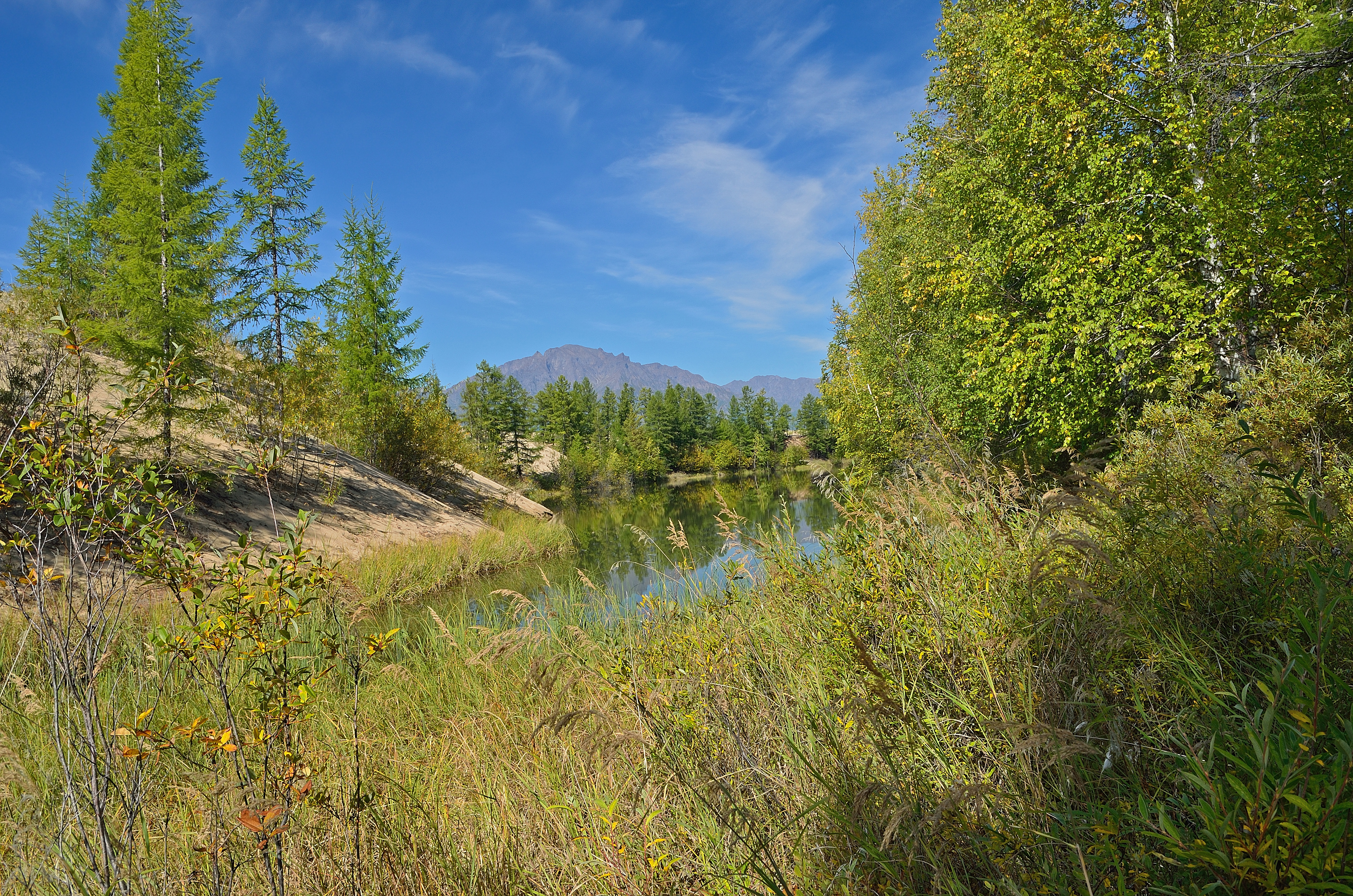
Lake Alyonushka

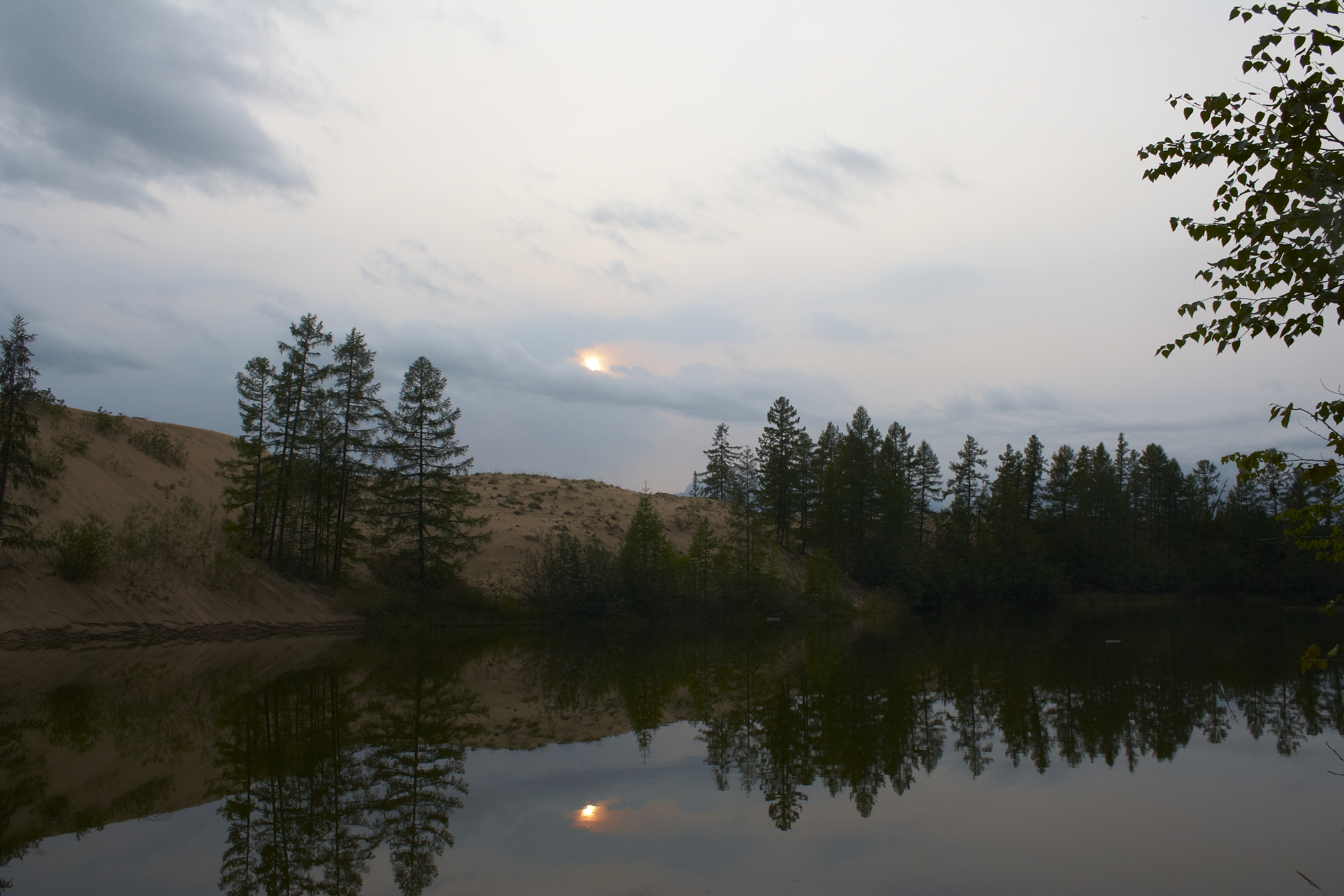
Lake Alyonushka at night

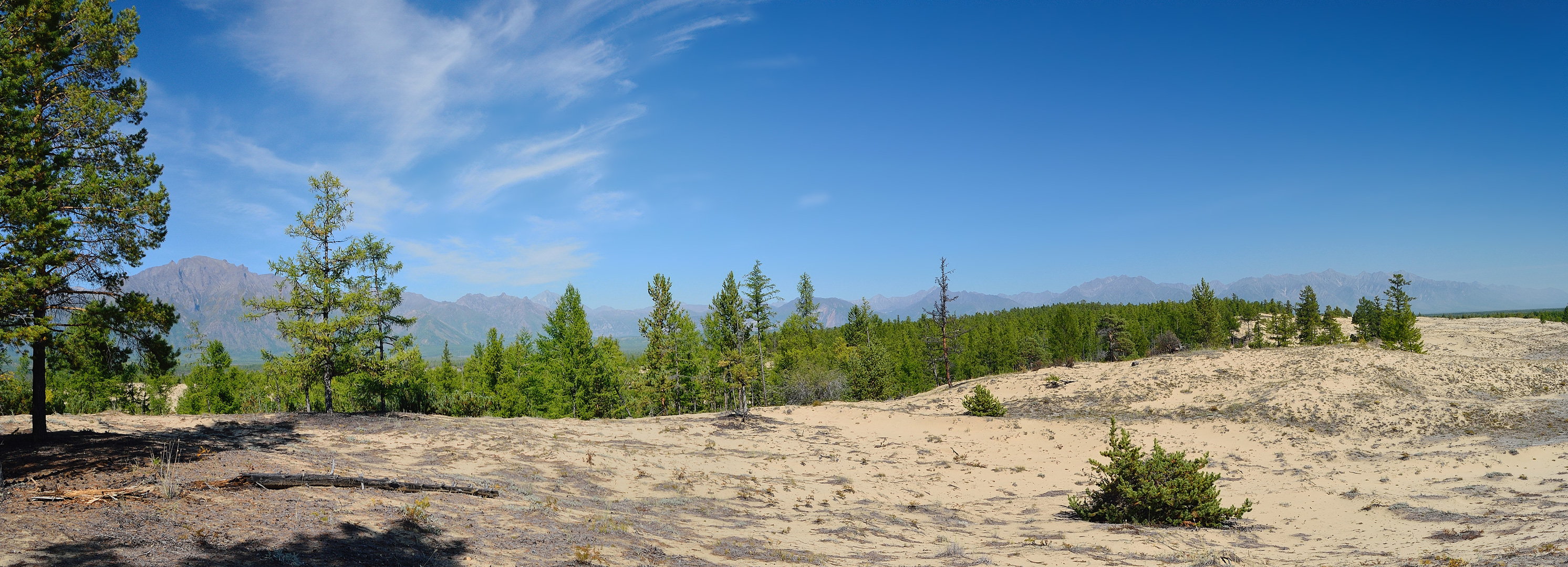
The edge of the sandy area.

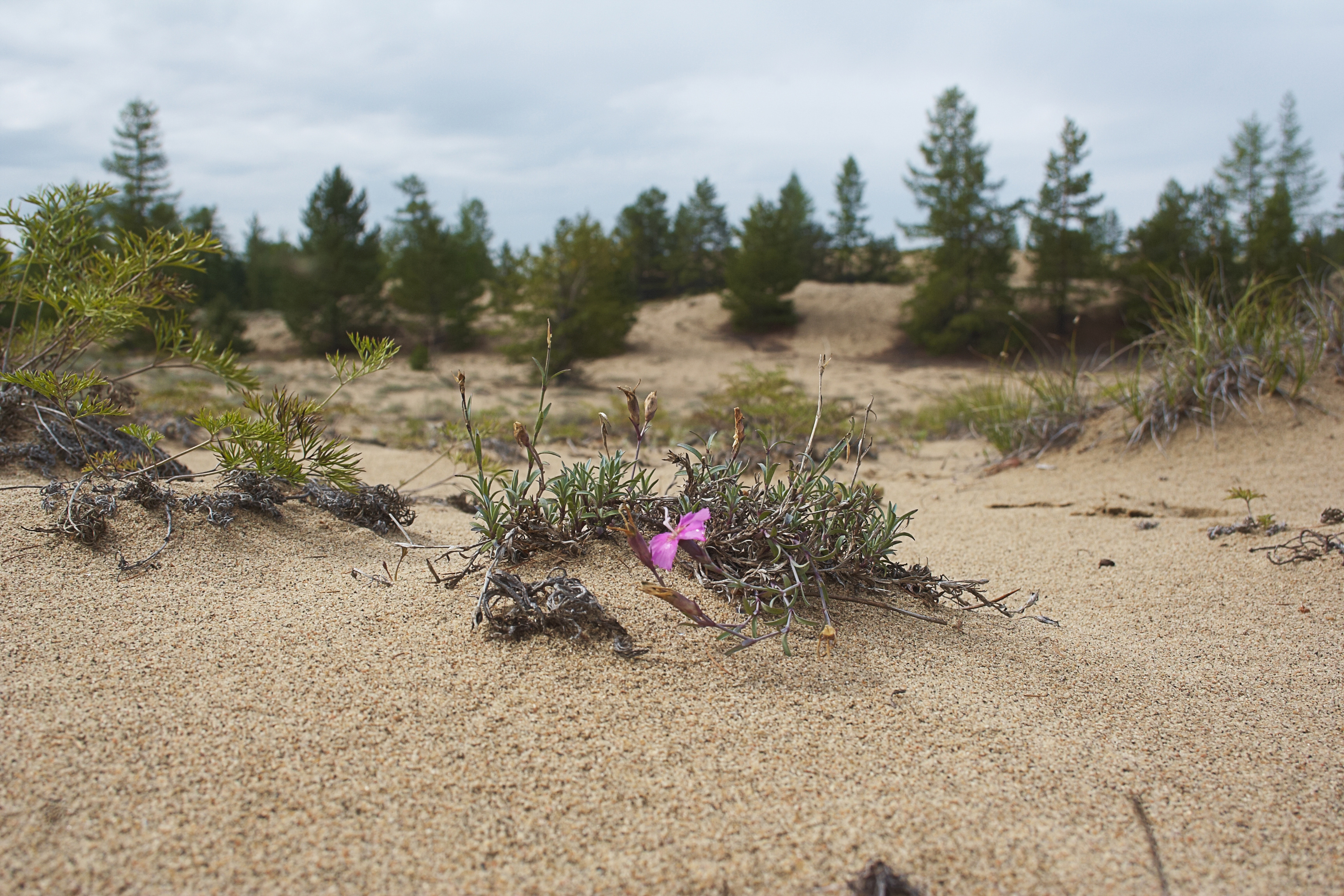
Blooming in the Chara Sands

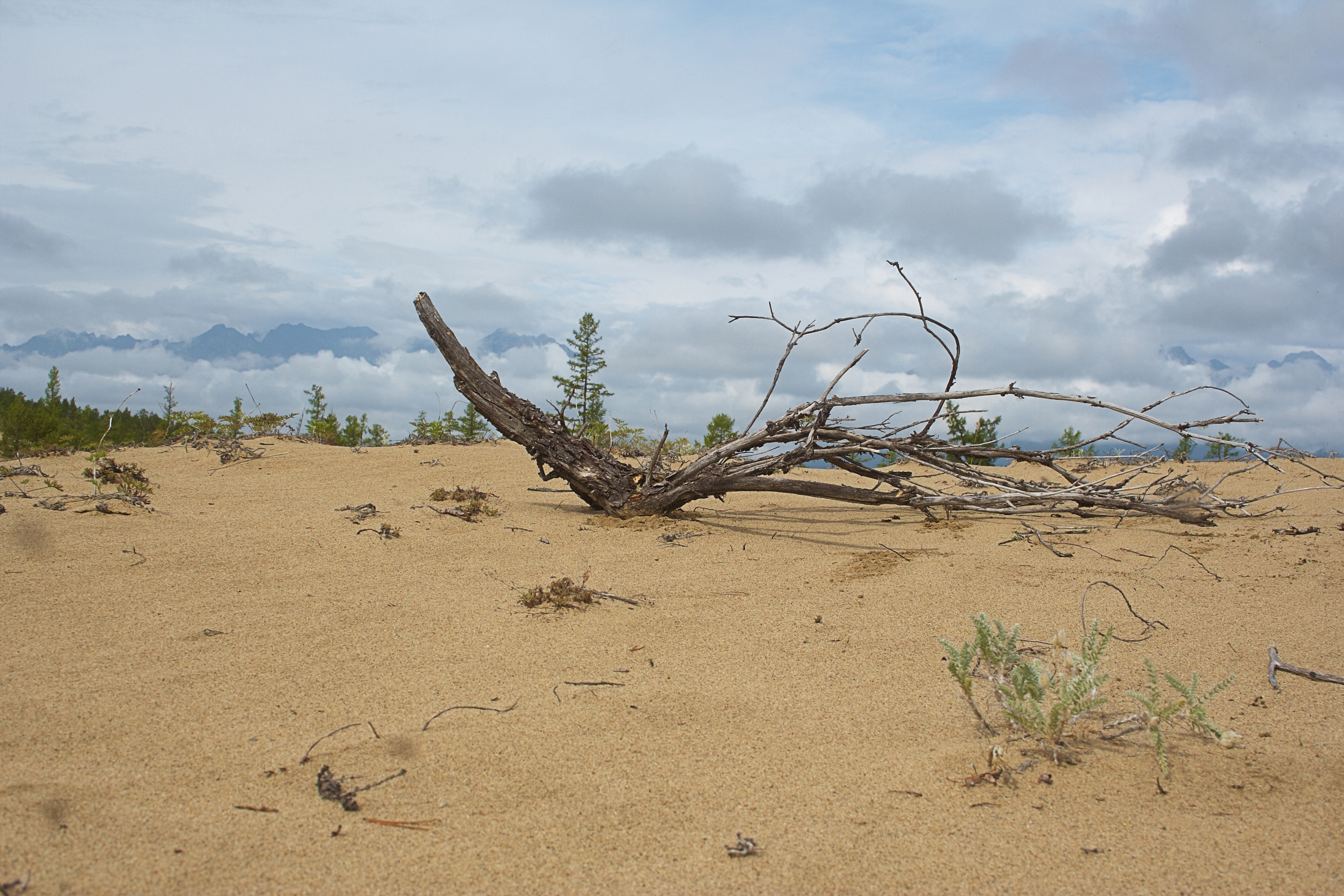

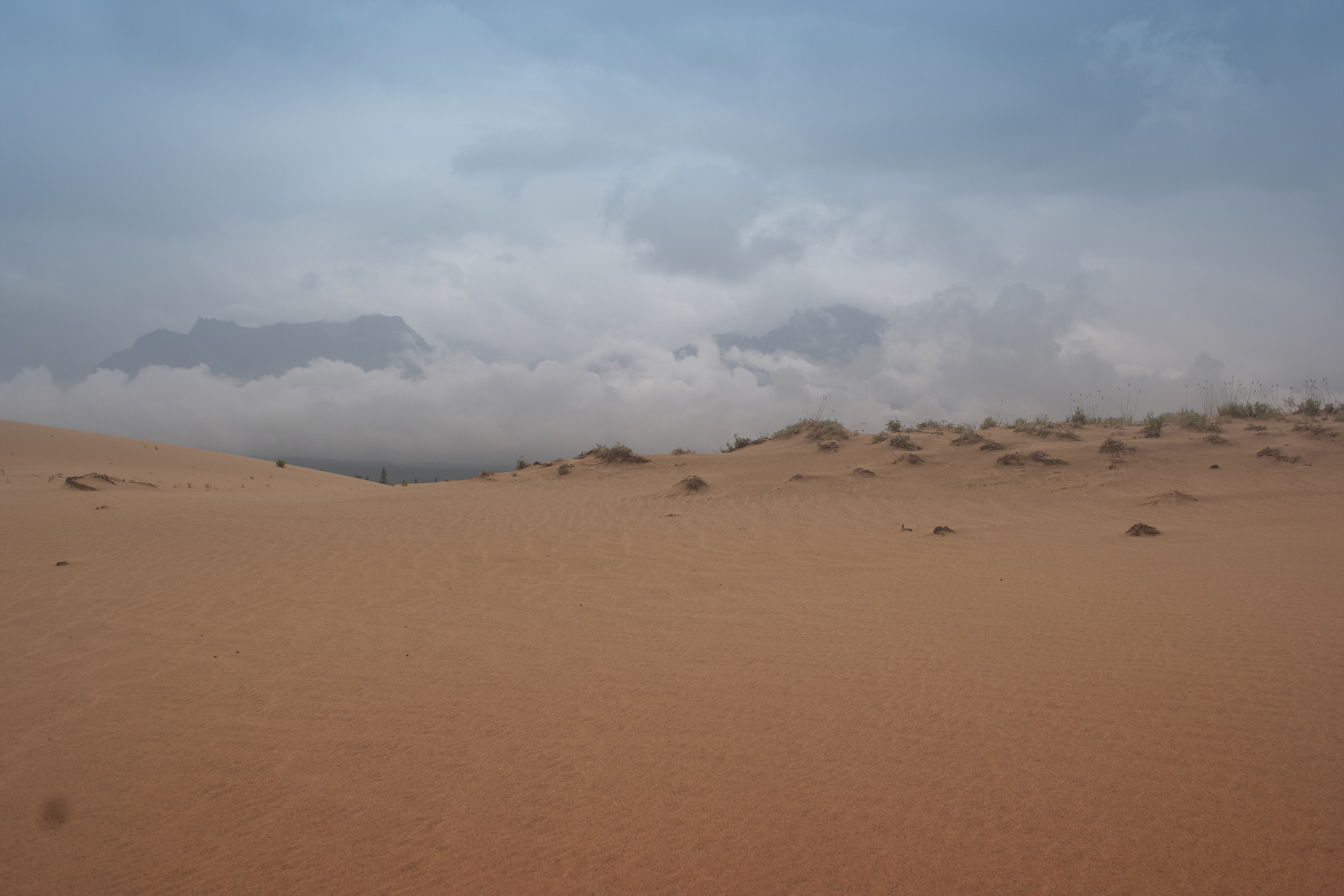

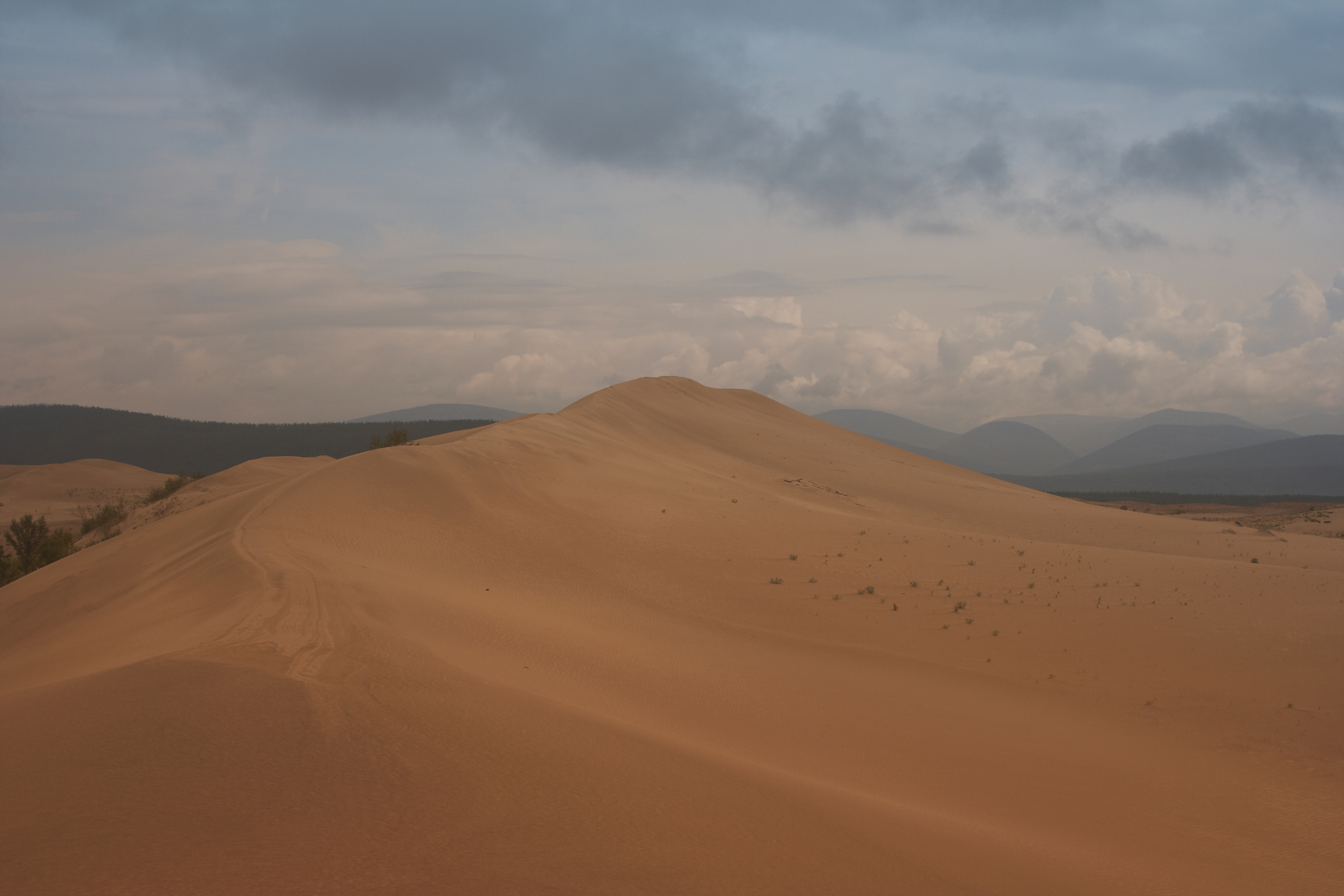

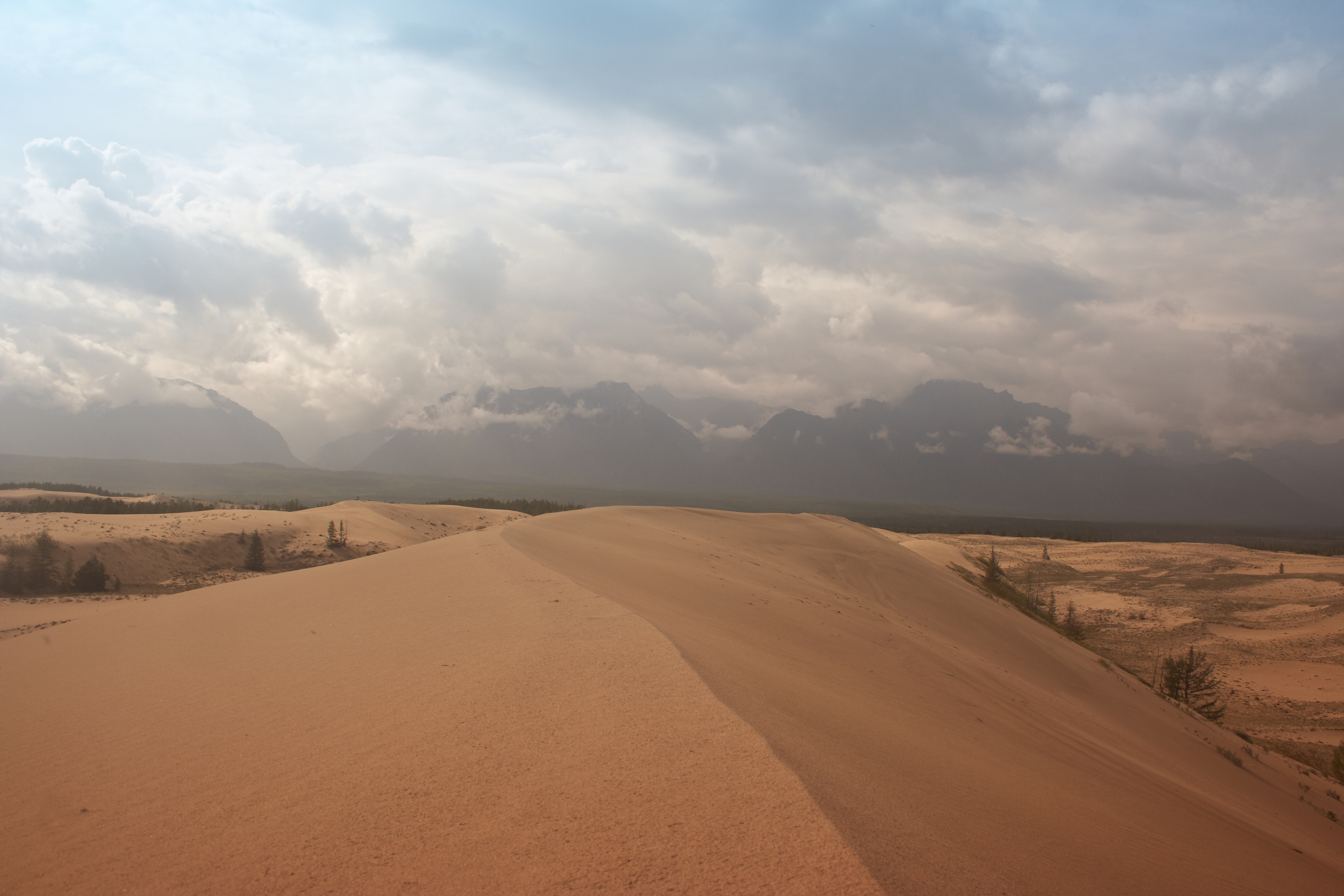
High dune ridge near the foothills of Kodar

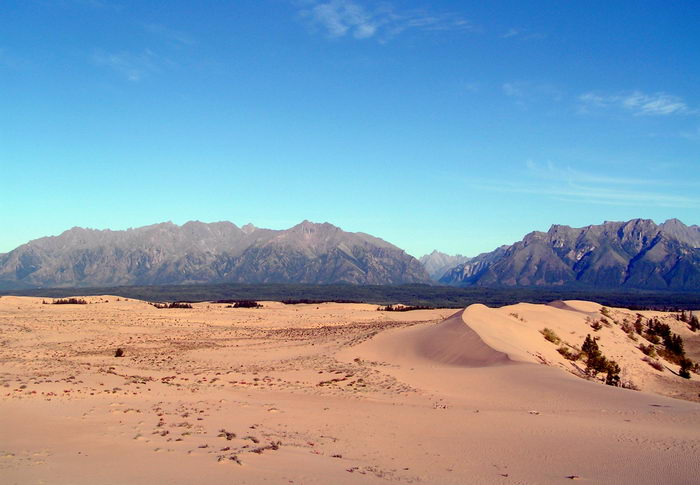
The Kodar mountain range with the Chara Sands in the foreground near Novaya Chara
