= Kalarsky District =

Kalarsky District Каларский район (Russian)
- District
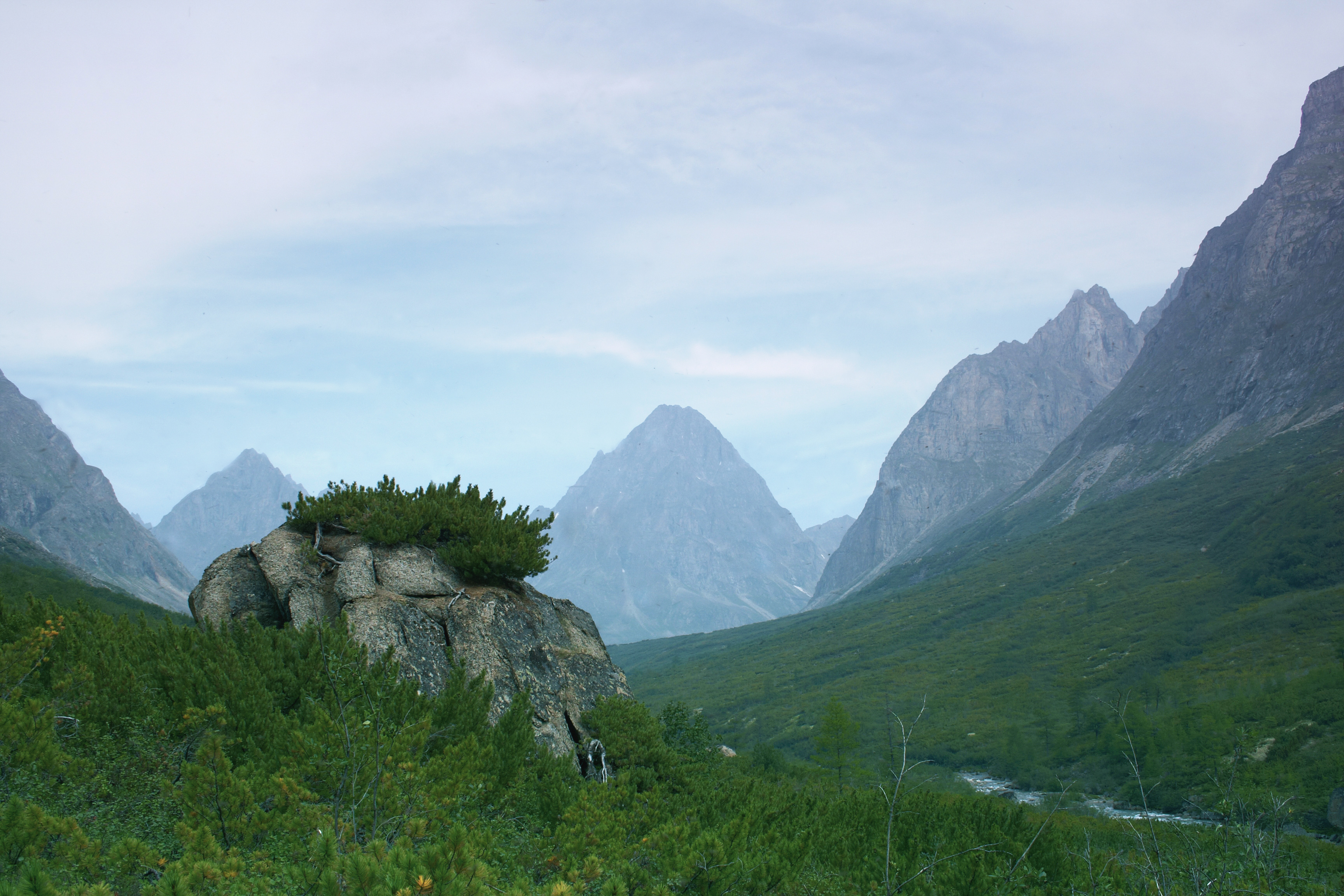
- Upper Middle River Sakukan, Kalarsky District

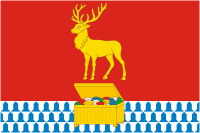
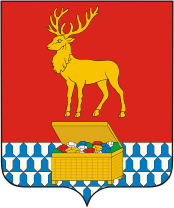
- Flag Coat of arms
- Location of Kalarsky District in Zabaykalsky Krai
- Coordinates: 56°30′N 118°30′E
- Country: Russia
- Federal subject: Zabaykalsky Krai
- Established: September 2, 1938
- Administrative center: Chara

Area
  - Total: 56,800 km^{2} (21,900 sq mi)

Population (2010 Census)
  - Total: 9,051
  - Estimate (2018): 8,018 (−11.4%)
  - Density: 0.159/km^{2} (0.413/sq mi)
  - Urban: 0%
  - Rural: 100%

Administrative structure
  - Inhabited localities: 1 urban-type settlements, 8 rural localities

Municipal structure
  - Municipally incorporated as: Kalarsky Municipal District
  - Municipal divisions: 1 urban settlements, 4 rural settlements
- Time zone: UTC+9 (MSK+6)
- OKTMO ID: 76615000
- Website: http://xn--80aa2af0a.xn--80aaaac8algcbgbck3fl0q.xn--p1ai/

Kalarsky District (Russian: Каларский район) is an administrative and municipal district (raion), one of the thirty-one in Zabaykalsky Krai, Russia. It is located in the north of the krai, and borders with Tungokochensky District and Tungiro-Olyokminsky District in the south. The area of the district is 56,800 square kilometers (21,900 sq mi). Its administrative center is the rural locality (a selo) of Chara. Population: 9,051 (2010 census); 9,785 (2002 Census); 20,942 (1989 Soviet census). The population of Chara accounts for 21.0% of the district's total population.

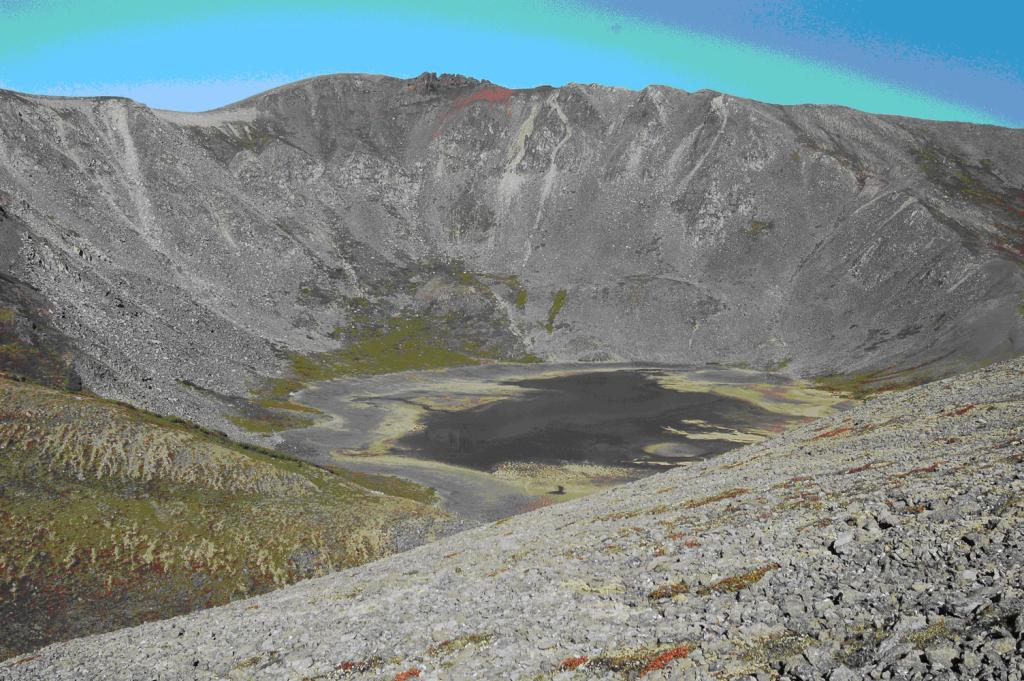
Volcano Aku, Kalarsky District

== History ==
The district was established on September 2, 1938.

== Geography ==
It is the northernmost district of Transbaikalia. The relief is mostly mountainous and includes the Kodar Range, with the highest point of Transbaikalia, Peak BAM, as well as the Udokan Range, Kalar Range and part of the Patom Highlands, among others. There are also vast intermontane basins, and the unique Chara Sands area. On the territory of the region flow many rivers: In the west the Vitim, in the center and the north the Chara river with its tributaries, and in the southern and western parts of the region some Vitim tributaries, such as the Kalar, Konda and Syulban. Among the lakes, the deep Nichatka, the Bolshoye Leprindo and the Leprindokan deserve mention.
