= Chara (rural locality) =

Chara Чара
- Selo
- Interactive map of Chara
- Location of Chara Chara (Zabaykalsky Krai)
- Coordinates: 56°55′N 118°16′E
- Country: Russia
- Federal subject: Zabaykalsky Krai
- Administrative district: Kalarsky District
- Elevation: 700 m (2,300 ft)

Population (2010 Census)
  - Total: 1,903
  - Estimate (2021): 1,594 (−16.2%)

Administrative status
  - Capital of: Kalarsky District
- Time zone: UTC+9 (MSK+6)
- Postal code: 674150
- OKTMO ID: 76615444101

Chara (Russian: Чара) is a rural locality (a selo) and the administrative center of Kalarsky District of Zabaykalsky Krai, Russia, located on the Chara River at an elevation of 710 meters (2,330 ft) above sea level. Population: 1,903 (2010 census); 2,063 (2002 census); 3,441 (1989 Soviet census).

== Geography ==
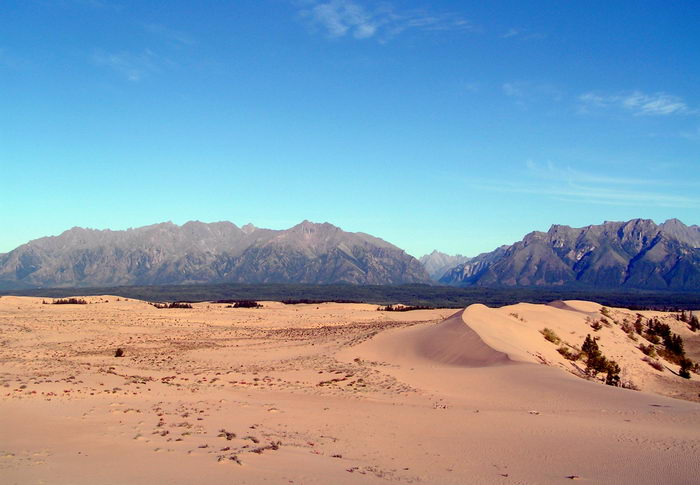
The Chara Sands, a "desert" in the middle of Siberia, as seen near Novaya Chara. The Kodar Mountains lie in the background.

The Chara Sands, a 34 square kilometers (13 sq mi) area of active sand dunes, lies 5 kilometers (3.1 mi) southwest of Chara.

=== Climate ===
Chara has a subarctic climate (Köppen climate classification Dwc), with long, bitterly cold winters and warm, mild summers. Precipitation is quite low but is much higher in summer than at other times of the year.

Climate data for Chara
Month	Jan	Feb	Mar	Apr	May	Jun	Jul	Aug	Sep	Oct	Nov	Dec	Year
Record high °C (°F)	−2.8 (27.0)	4.2 (39.6)	14.8 (58.6)	21.1 (70.0)	28.7 (83.7)	35.0 (95.0)	35.8 (96.4)	33.8 (92.8)	27.4 (81.3)	19.3 (66.7)	7.5 (45.5)	0.6 (33.1)	35.8 (96.4)
Mean daily maximum °C (°F)	−24.7 (−12.5)	−16.5 (2.3)	−6.7 (19.9)	3.3 (37.9)	12.4 (54.3)	21.5 (70.7)	23.7 (74.7)	20.9 (69.6)	12.1 (53.8)	0.9 (33.6)	−14.1 (6.6)	−25.3 (−13.5)	0.6 (33.1)
Daily mean °C (°F)	−31.8 (−25.2)	−26.3 (−15.3)	−16.2 (2.8)	−3.2 (26.2)	5.9 (42.6)	14.2 (57.6)	16.8 (62.2)	13.8 (56.8)	5.5 (41.9)	−5.6 (21.9)	−21.0 (−5.8)	−31.1 (−24.0)	−6.6 (20.1)
Mean daily minimum °C (°F)	−37.3 (−35.1)	−34.5 (−30.1)	−26.2 (−15.2)	−10.6 (12.9)	−0.7 (30.7)	6.7 (44.1)	10.0 (50.0)	7.1 (44.8)	−0.2 (31.6)	−11.2 (11.8)	−26.6 (−15.9)	−35.9 (−32.6)	−13.3 (8.1)
Record low °C (°F)	−54.4 (−65.9)	−56.2 (−69.2)	−48.7 (−55.7)	−36.8 (−34.2)	−18.7 (−1.7)	−6.2 (20.8)	−2.5 (27.5)	−5.3 (22.5)	−17.9 (−0.2)	−35.5 (−31.9)	−47.5 (−53.5)	−53.8 (−64.8)	−56.2 (−69.2)
Average precipitation mm (inches)	3.4 (0.13)	2.3 (0.09)	2.2 (0.09)	14.1 (0.56)	42.0 (1.65)	66.1 (2.60)	87.0 (3.43)	82.6 (3.25)	53.3 (2.10)	15.8 (0.62)	7.8 (0.31)	4.3 (0.17)	380.9 (15)
Average relative humidity (%)	78	72	66	59	58	65	71	75	72	72	77	79	70
Mean monthly sunshine hours	78	144	208	231	245	249	248	214	162	149	99	59	2,086
Source 1: Pogoda.ru.net
Source 2: HKO

== Transportation ==
It is served by the Chara Airport.

== Famous Natives ==
- Kristina Karapetyan is a Russian and Kazakhstani volleyball player.
