= Kodar Mountains =

Mountain range in Siberia

Kodar
- Кодар
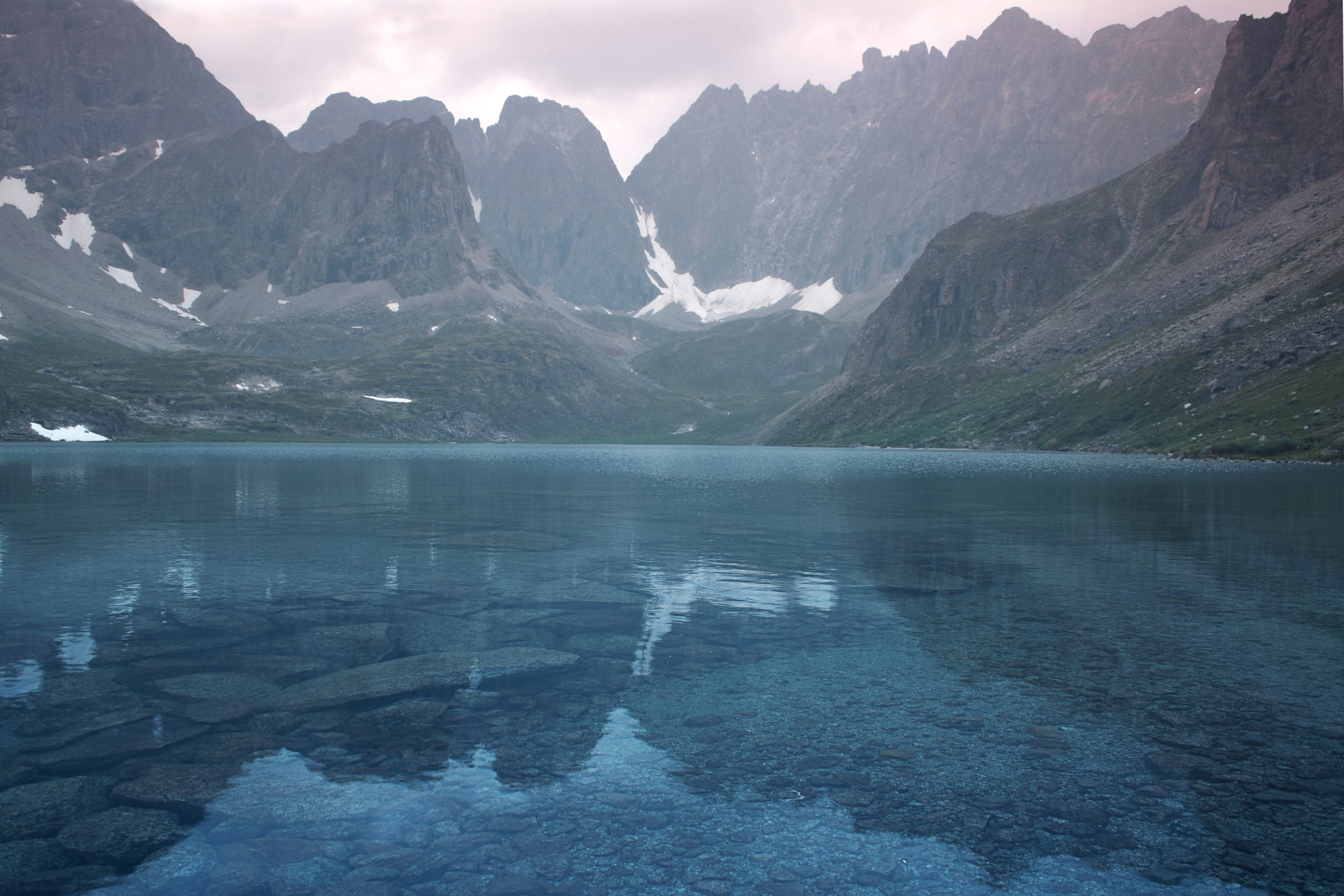
- Lake Uglovoye

Highest point
- Peak: Pik BAM
- Elevation: 3,072 m (10,079 ft)
- Coordinates: 56°51′54.85″N 117°34′47.32″E

Dimensions
- Length: 250 km (160 mi) WSW / ENE
- Width: 50–60 km (31–37 mi)

Geography
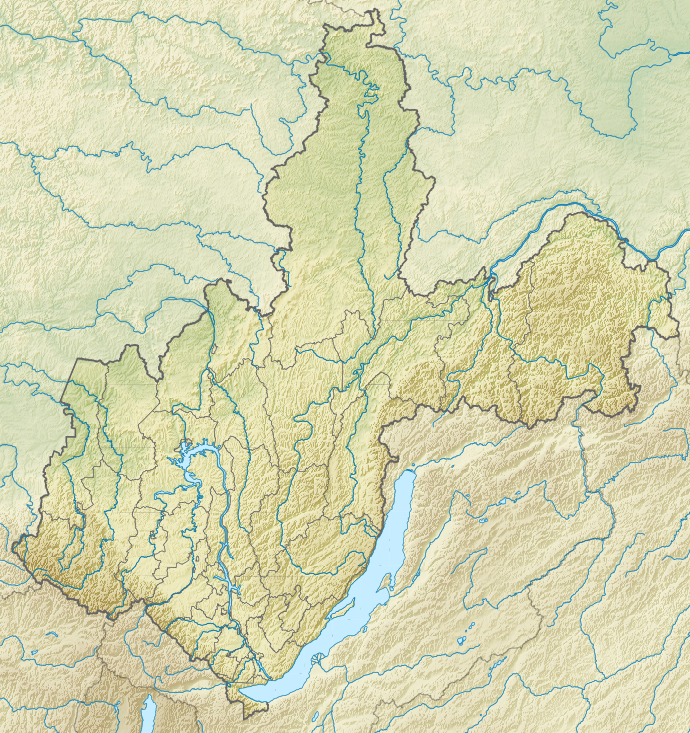
- Location within Irkutsk Oblast Location within Zabaykalsky Krai Location within Far Eastern Federal District
- Country: Russia
- Oblast/Krai: Irkutsk Oblast and Zabaykalsky Krai
- Range coordinates: 56°55′16″N 117°06′00″E
- Parent range: Stanovoy Highlands; South Siberian System

Geology
- Rock ages: Proterozoic and Early Archean

The Kodar Mountains (Russian: Кода́р) are a mountain range in the Transbaikal region of Siberia, Russia. The name Kodar is derived from "khada", an Evenki word for rock.

The range is part of the Udokan Ore Region that includes the Kalar and Udokan ranges.

== Geography ==
The Kodar Mountains are part of the Stanovoy Highlands, which range from the northern tip of Lake Baikal to the Olyokma River. The Northern Muya Range rises at the western end and the Delyun-Uran Range to the northwest. Lying within the Baikal Rift Zone, the area is prone to earthquakes. The range is bounded by the Vitim and Chara rivers, both tributaries of the Lena. To the north and northeast it borders with the Olyokma-Chara Plateau —in the upper reaches of the Chara river. The Apsat River flows through the range.

The Kodar range is the highest in the Transbaikal region. 3,072 meters (10,079 ft) high Pik BAM (Baikal Amur Magistral) is the highest summit of the range and the Stanovoy Highlands, as well as of Zabaykalsky Krai. Some sources claim that neighboring Pik Martena, rising 8 kilometers (5.0 mi) to the WSW, beyond the border, is the highest point of Irkutsk Oblast.

The topography consists of narrow, deep valleys that descend over 1,000 meters (3,300 ft) from the surrounding terrain. According to a 2013 study, the range contains 34 glaciers. With the exception of some tropical glaciers, they are the most isolated glaciers of the world, over 1,200 kilometers (750 mi) away from any other glacier. The glaciers are small, at most 2.1 kilometers (1.3 mi) in length.

== Climate ==
The area experiences a subarctic climate, with the Siberian High resulting in very low temperatures and precipitation from November to March. Meteorological measurements taken in 1960s reported between 850 and 1,000 millimeters (33 and 39 in) of precipitation a year at an elevation of 2,500 meters (8,200 ft), with 50 percent falling as snow. Although snow can occur any time of year, 80 percent falls in late Spring and early Autumn. The snow line is between 2,200 and 2,600 meters (7,200 and 8,500 ft).

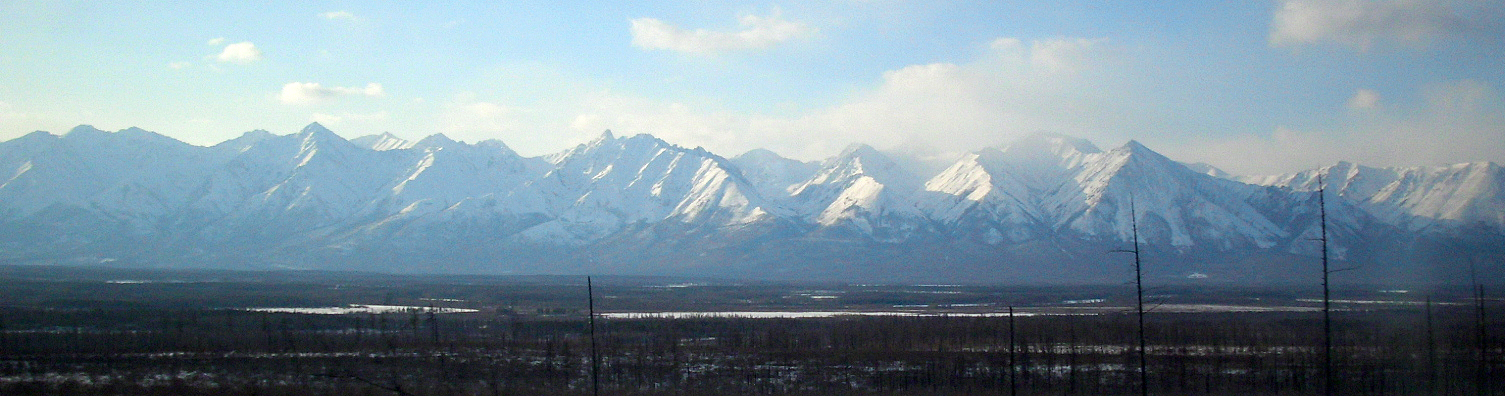
Panoramic view of the Kodar Range from the Chara river valley.

== See also ==
- Chara Sands
- Lake Oron
- List of highest points of Russian federal subjects
- List of mountains and hills of Russia
- List of ultras of Northeast Asia
